= List of cities, towns, and villages in Slovenia: N =

This is a list of cities, towns, and villages in Slovenia, starting with N.

| Settlement | Municipality |
|---|---|
| Na Logu | Škofja Loka |
| Nadanje Selo | Pivka |
| Nadbišec | Lenart |
| Nadgrad | Slovenska Bistrica |
| Nadlesk | Loška dolina |
| Nadole | Žetale |
| Nadrožica | Komen |
| Naklo | Črnomelj |
| Naklo | Divača |
| Naklo | Naklo |
| Nanos | Vipava |
| Naraplje | Majšperk |
| Naredi | Velike Lašče |
| Narin | Pivka |
| Nasirec | Hrpelje-Kozina |
| Nasova | Gornja Radgona |
| Nasovče | Komenda |
| Navrški Vrh | Ravne na Koroškem |
| Nazarje | Nazarje |
| Neblo | Brda |
| Nebova | Maribor |
| Nedelica | Turnišče |
| Negastrn | Moravče |
| Negova | Gornja Radgona |
| Negovski Vrh | Benedikt |
| Nemci | Nova Gorica |
| Nemčavci | Murska Sobota |
| Nemilje | Kranj |
| Nemška Gora | Krško |
| Nemška Loka | Kočevje |
| Nemška vas na Blokah | Bloke |
| Nemška vas | Krško |
| Nemška vas | Ribnica |
| Nemški Rovt | Bohinj |
| Neradnovci | Gornji Petrovci |
| Nestoplja vas | Semič |
| Neverke | Pivka |
| Nevlje | Kamnik |
| Nezbiše | Podčetrtek |
| Nimno | Rogaška Slatina |
| Nizka | Mozirje |
| Niževec | Borovnica |
| Njiverce | Kidričevo |
| Njivica | Kranj |
| Njivice | Radeče |
| Nomenj | Bohinj |
| Norički Vrh | Gornja Radgona |
| Noršinci pri Ljutomeru | Ljutomer |
| Noršinci | Moravske Toplice |
| Noše | Radovljica |
| Notranje Gorice | Brezovica |
| Nova Cerkev | Vojnik |
| Nova Gora | Dolenjske Toplice |
| Nova Gora | Krško |
| Nova Gora | Litija |
| Nova Gorica | Nova Gorica |
| Nova Lipa | Črnomelj |
| Nova Oselica | Gorenja vas-Poljane |
| Nova Sela | Kostel |
| Nova Sušica | Pivka |
| Nova Štifta | Sodražica |
| Nova vas nad Dragonjo | Piran |
| Nova vas ob Sotli | Brežice |
| Nova vas pri Jelšanah | Ilirska Bistrica |
| Nova vas pri Konjicah | Slovenske Konjice |
| Nova vas pri Lescah | Radovljica |
| Nova vas pri Markovcih | Markovci |
| Nova vas pri Mokricah | Brežice |
| Nova vas pri Šmarju | Šmarje pri Jelšah |
| Nova vas | Bloke |
| Nova vas | Ivančna Gorica |
| Nova vas | Miren-Kostanjevica |
| Nova vas | Preddvor |
| Nova vas | Sežana |
| Novake | Slovenska Bistrica |
| Novake | Tržič |
| Novake | Vojnik |
| Nove Ložine | Kočevje |
| Novelo | Miren-Kostanjevica |
| Novi Grad | Sevnica |
| Novi Kot | Loški Potok |
| Novi Lazi | Kočevje |
| Novi Pot | Sodražica |
| Novi Svet | Logatec |
| Novi Vrh | Gornja Radgona |
| Novinci | Sveti Andraž v Slovenskih goricah |
| Novo Celje | Žalec |
| Novo mesto | Novo mesto |
| Novo Tepanje | Slovenske Konjice |
| Novokračine | Ilirska Bistrica |
| Nozno | Brda |
| Nožed | Izola |
| Nožice | Domžale |
| Nunska Graba | Ljutomer |
| Nuskova | Rogašovci |
