= Kupčinji Vrh =

- Location in Slovenia
- Coordinates: 46°16′27.08″N 15°44′15.95″E
- Country: Slovenia
- Traditional region: Styria
- Statistical region: Drava
- Municipality: Majšperk

Area
  - Total: 5.69 km^{2} (2.20 sq mi)
- Elevation: 404.6 m (1,327 ft)

Population (2002)
  - Total: 132

Kupčinji Vrh (pronounced [kupˈtʃiːnji ˈʋəɾx]) is a settlement in the southwestern Haloze Hills on the northern foothills of Mount Saint Donatus in the Municipality of Majšperk in northeastern Slovenia. The area is part of the traditional region of Styria. It is now included with the rest of the municipality in the Drava Statistical Region.

== Geography ==
Kupčinji Vrh lies along the headwaters of Travni potok and Gabrščica creeks.

== History ==
Kupčinji Vrh was established in 1974 from part of the territory of the settlements of Čermožiše and Nadole.

== Church ==
The local church, built on an isolated hill north of the settlement, is dedicated to Saints Hermagoras and Fortunatus and belongs to the Parish of Žetale. It dates to the 15th century and has a wooden belfry.
