= Haloze dialect =

Dialect of Slovene

The Haloze dialect (Slovene: haloško narečje, haloščina) is a Slovene dialect in the Pannonian dialect group. It is spoken in the Haloze Hills south of the line defined by the Dravinja and Drava rivers, extending to the Croatian border, bounded on the west by a line running from southeast of Majšperk to Donačka Gora and the Macelj border crossing. Larger settlements in the dialect area include Podlehnik, Žetale, and Gradišče.

== Phonological and morphological characteristics ==
The Haloze dialect lacks pitch accent and is characterized by the phonological development of hard ł > o. The adjectival declension has o instead of standard e (e.g., -oga instead of -ega). The cluster šč is preserved in the dialect and the ending -do is frequent in third-person plural verb forms.
