= Rodni Vrh =

- Location in Slovenia
- Coordinates: 46°19′27.67″N 15°50′6.22″E
- Country: Slovenia
- Traditional region: Styria
- Statistical region: Drava
- Municipality: Podlehnik

Area
  - Total: 3.85 km^{2} (1.49 sq mi)
- Elevation: 365.7 m (1,200 ft)

Population (2002)
  - Total: 50

Rodni Vrh (pronounced [ˈɾoːdni ˈʋəɾx]) is a settlement in the Haloze area of eastern Slovenia. It lies in the Municipality of Podlehnik. The area is part of the traditional region of Styria. It is now included in the Drava Statistical Region.

The local church, built on a hill in the northern part of the settlement, is dedicated to the Holy Spirit and belongs to the Parish of Sveta Trojica–Podlehnik. The Gothic sanctuary dates to the second half of the 15th century and the rest of the building dates to 1662.
