= Janški Vrh =

- Location in Slovenia
- Coordinates: 46°20′7.38″N 15°47′21.76″E
- Country: Slovenia
- Traditional region: Styria
- Statistical region: Drava
- Municipality: Majšperk

Area
  - Total: 5.01 km^{2} (1.93 sq mi)
- Elevation: 417.4 m (1,369 ft)

Population (2002)
  - Total: 61

Janški Vrh (pronounced [ˈjaːnʃki ˈʋəɾx]) is a settlement above the right bank of the Dravinja River in the Municipality of Majšperk in northeastern Slovenia. The area is part of the traditional region of Styria. It is now included with the rest of the municipality in the Drava Statistical Region.

== Geography ==
It lies in the extreme northwestern part of Haloze. There are many vineyards and forests in the settlement. There is also a lot of livestock farming.

== Church ==
The local church, built on a hill above the Dravinja Valley, is dedicated to Saint John the Baptist and belongs to the Parish of Ptujska Gora. It dates to the 16th century.
