= Zakl, Podlehnik =

Zakl
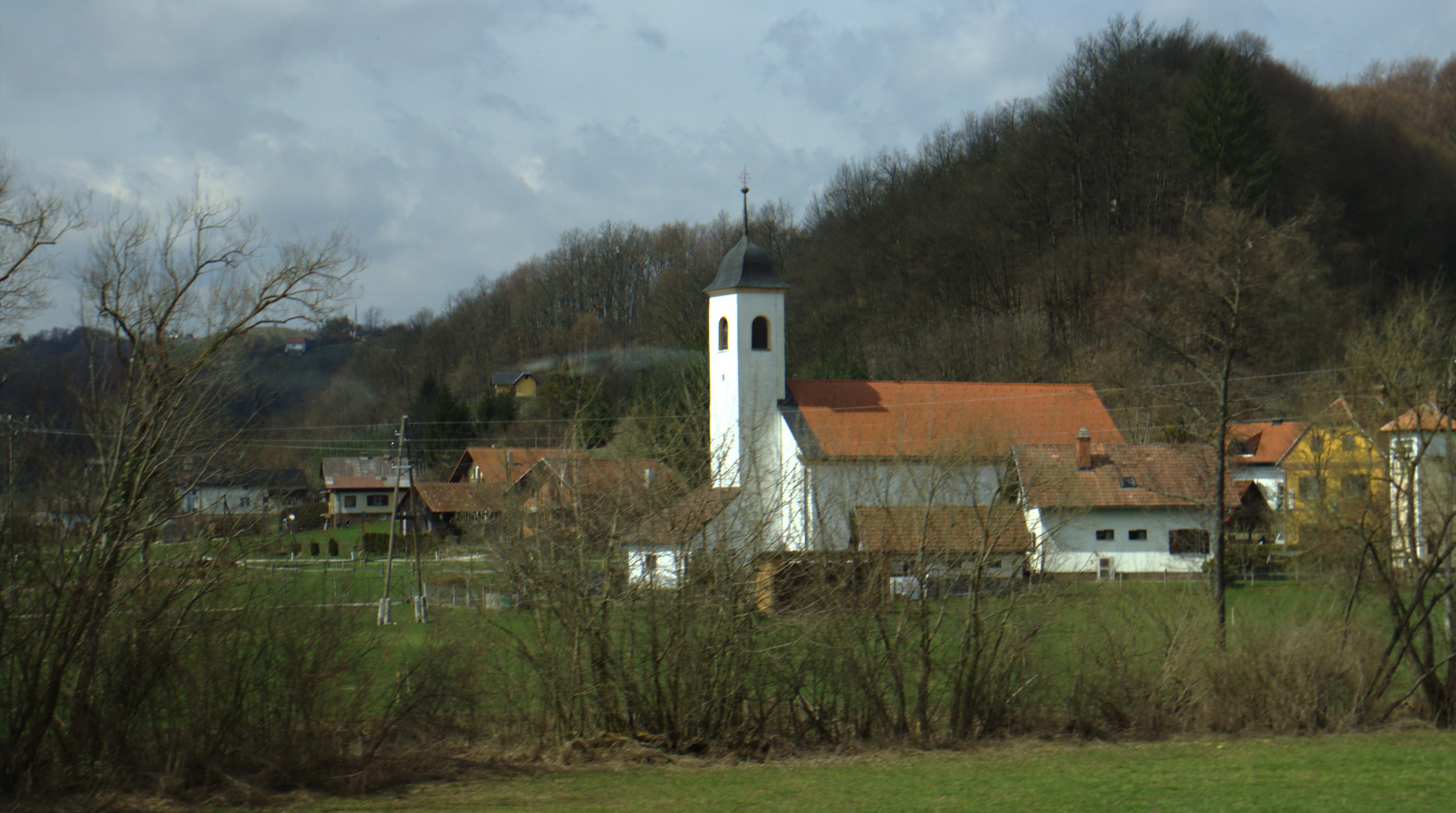
- Church in Zakl

- Location in Slovenia
- Coordinates: 46°19′19.14″N 15°52′4.32″E
- Country: Slovenia
- Traditional region: Styria
- Statistical region: Drava
- Municipality: Podlehnik

Area
  - Total: 1.82 km^{2} (0.70 sq mi)
- Elevation: 293.2 m (962 ft)

Population (2002)
  - Total: 218

Zakl (pronounced [ˈzaːkəl]) is a settlement in the Haloze Hills in the Municipality of Podlehnik in eastern Slovenia. The area is part of the traditional region of Styria. It is now included in the Drava Statistical Region.

The local church, dedicated to Our Lady of Sorrows, is actually in the neighbouring settlement of Stanošina, but is known as the Zakl church. It was built between 1743 and 1773.
