= Preša =

- Location in Slovenia
- Coordinates: 46°19′45.59″N 15°43′30.93″E
- Country: Slovenia
- Traditional region: Styria
- Statistical region: Drava
- Municipality: Majšperk

Area
  - Total: 1.28 km^{2} (0.49 sq mi)
- Elevation: 243.6 m (799 ft)

Population (2020)
  - Total: 85

Preša (pronounced [ˈpɾeːʃa]) is a village in the Municipality of Majšperk in northeastern Slovenia. It lies southwest of Breg, along the road from Rogatec to Majšperk in the valley of Skralska Creek, a minor right tributary of the Dravinja River. The area is part of the traditional region of Styria. It is now included with the rest of the municipality in the Drava Statistical Region.

== Geography ==
In the valley there are mostly meadows and fields, on the slopes there are some vineyards and orchards, and higher up there are forests.
