= Dol pri Stopercah =

- Location in Slovenia
- Coordinates: 46°17′56.55″N 15°44′54.54″E
- Country: Slovenia
- Traditional region: Styria
- Statistical region: Drava
- Municipality: Majšperk

Area
  - Total: 1.2 km^{2} (0.46 sq mi)
- Elevation: 362.6 m (1,190 ft)

Population (2015)
  - Total: 33

Dol pri Stopercah (pronounced [ˈdoːl pɾi ˈstoːpɛɾtsax]) is a small dispersed settlement in the Haloze Hills in the Municipality of Majšperk in northeastern Slovenia. The area is part of the traditional region of Styria. It is now included with the rest of the municipality in the Drava Statistical Region.

== History ==
It was established in 1974 from part of the territory of the settlement of Sitež. In 2015, it had 33 inhabitants. It is a settlement on the southern slope of Jelovice Hill, in which farmers are involved with livestock and forestry.
