= Medvedce =

- Location in Slovenia
- Coordinates: 46°21′34.22″N 15°42′20.79″E
- Country: Slovenia
- Traditional region: Styria
- Statistical region: Drava
- Municipality: Majšperk

Area
  - Total: 1.81 km^{2} (0.70 sq mi)
- Elevation: 255.5 m (838 ft)

Population (2020)
  - Total: 106

Medvedce (pronounced [mɛˈdʋeːtsɛ], in older sources Medvece, German: Medvetzen) is a small village in the Municipality of Majšperk in northeastern Slovenia. The area is part of the traditional region of Styria. It is now included with the rest of the municipality in the Drava Statistical Region.

== Geography ==
Its center is in the valley along the road between Sestrže and Ptujska Gora. The place was once also known for its coal mine.

== Cultural heritage ==
The village chapel-shrine with a small belfry was built in the early 20th century.
