= Skrblje =

- Location in Slovenia
- Coordinates: 46°20′0.41″N 15°44′34.72″E
- Country: Slovenia
- Traditional region: Styria
- Statistical region: Drava
- Municipality: Majšperk

Area
  - Total: 1.16 km^{2} (0.45 sq mi)
- Elevation: 247.7 m (813 ft)

Population (2020)
  - Total: 76

Skrblje (pronounced [ˈskəɾbljɛ]) is a dispersed settlement in the northwestern Haloze Hills south of Breg in the Municipality of Majšperk in northeastern Slovenia. The area is part of the traditional region of Styria. It is now included with the rest of the municipality in the Drava Statistical Region.
