= Sitež =

- Location in Slovenia
- Coordinates: 46°18′27.2″N 15°46′1.32″E
- Country: Slovenia
- Traditional region: Styria
- Statistical region: Drava
- Municipality: Majšperk

Area
  - Total: 2.21 km^{2} (0.85 sq mi)
- Elevation: 367 m (1,204 ft)

Population (2002)
  - Total: 47

Sitež (pronounced [ˈsiːtɛʃ]) is a settlement in the Municipality of Majšperk in northeastern Slovenia. It lies in the Haloze Hills on the regional road from Majšperk to Žetale and in the valley of Jesenica Creek. In the valley there are mainly meadows and fields, and on the slopes there are some vineyards and orchards.

The area is part of the traditional region of Styria. It is now included with the rest of the municipality in the Drava Statistical Region.
