= Municipality of Podlehnik =

Municipality of Slovenia

Municipality of Podlehnik Občina Podlehnik
- Municipality
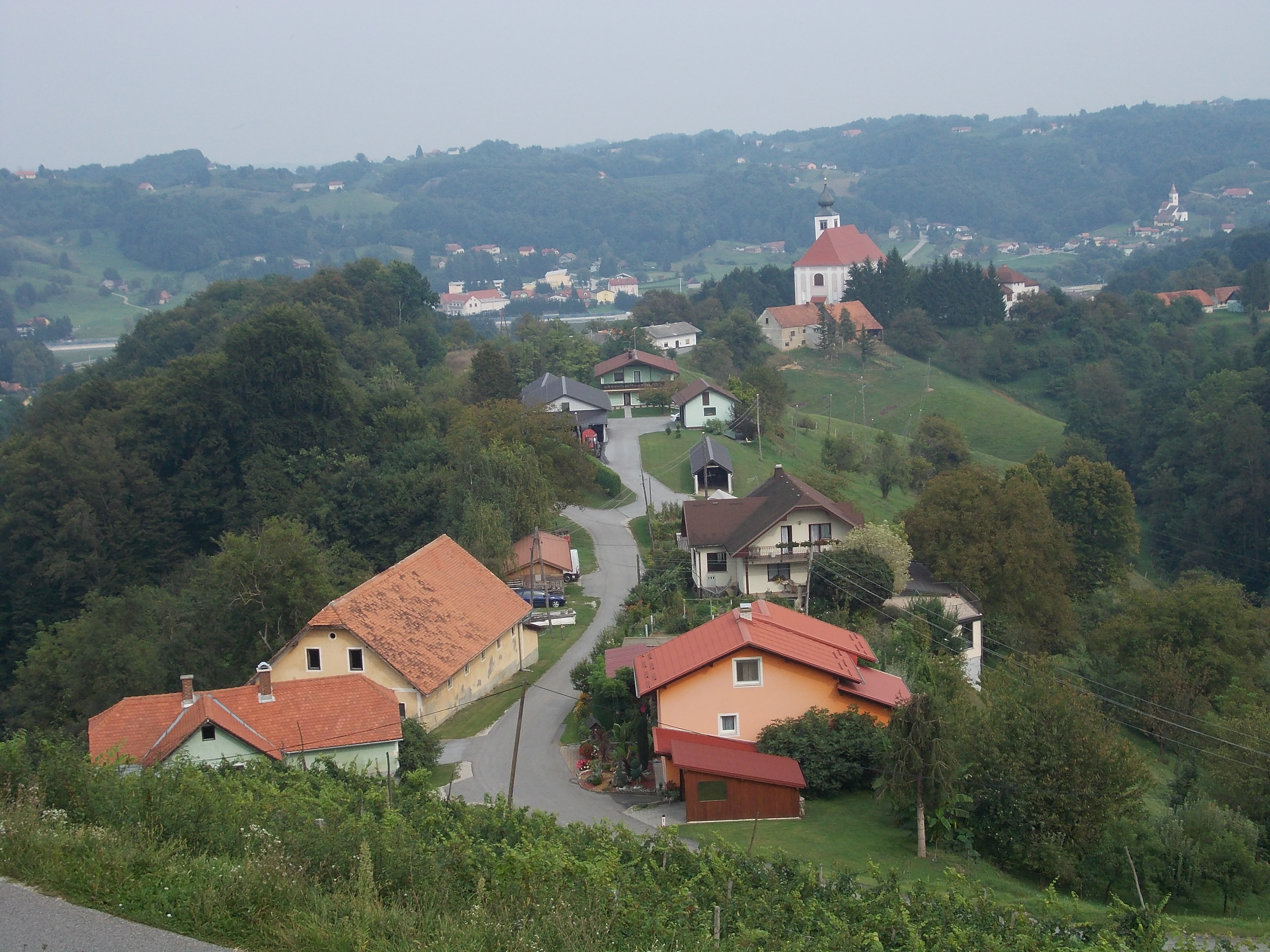

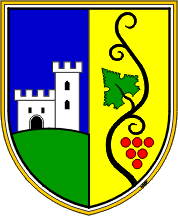
- Coat of arms

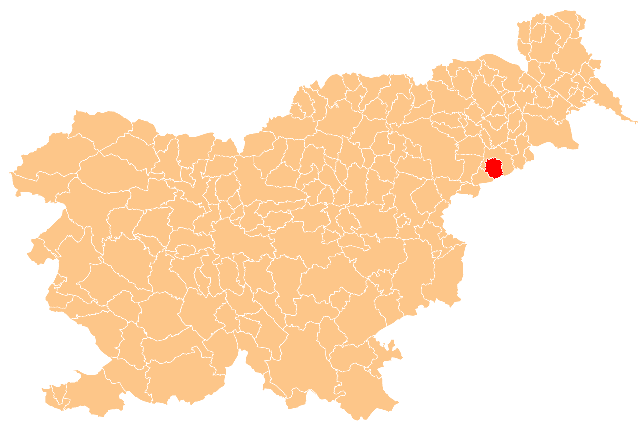
- Location of the Municipality of Podlehnik in Slovenia
- Coordinates: 46°20′N 15°53′E
- Country: Slovenia

Government
  - Mayor: Sebastian Toplak (Independent)

Area
  - Total: 46.0 km^{2} (17.8 sq mi)

Population (2016)
  - Total: 1,810
  - Density: 39.3/km^{2} (102/sq mi)
- Time zone: UTC+01 (CET)
  - Summer (DST): UTC+02 (CEST)
- Website: www.poodlehnik.si

The Municipality of Podlehnik (pronounced [pɔˈdleːxnik]; Slovene: Občina Podlehnik) is a municipality in Slovenia. It lies in the traditional region of Styria in northeastern Slovenia and belongs to the Drava Statistical Region. The municipality borders on the municipalities of Videm and Žetale, and Croatia. The seat of the municipality is the town of Podlehnik. The municipality was established in 1999.

== Settlements ==
In addition to the municipal seat of Podlehnik, the municipality also includes the following settlements:

- Dežno pri Podlehniku
- Gorca
- Jablovec
- Kozminci
- Ložina
- Rodni Vrh
- Sedlašek
- Spodnje Gruškovje
- Stanošina
- Strajna
- Zakl
- Zgornje Gruškovje
