= Hrastovec, Zavrč =

Hrastovec
- Location in Slovenia
- Coordinates: 46°22′6.28″N 16°2′9.22″E
- Country: Slovenia
- Traditional region: Styria
- Statistical region: Drava
- Municipality: Zavrč

Area
  - Total: 4.16 km^{2} (1.61 sq mi)
- Elevation: 274.1 m (899 ft)

Population (2002)
  - Total: 392

Hrastovec (pronounced [ˈxɾaːstɔʋəts]) is a settlement in the Municipality of Zavrč in the Haloze area of eastern Slovenia. It lies in the hills above the right bank of the Drava River.The area is part of the traditional region of Styria. It is now included in the Drava Statistical Region.
