= Stanošina =

- Location in Slovenia
- Coordinates: 46°19′3.23″N 15°52′35.44″E
- Country: Slovenia
- Traditional region: Styria
- Statistical region: Drava
- Municipality: Podlehnik

Area
  - Total: 3.34 km^{2} (1.29 sq mi)
- Elevation: 241.8 m (793 ft)

Population (2002)
  - Total: 164

Stanošina (pronounced [ˈstaːnɔʃina]) is a settlement in the Haloze Hills in the Municipality of Podlehnik in eastern Slovenia. It stretches along the main road south of Podlehnik towards the border with Croatia. The area is part of the traditional region of Styria. It is now included in the Drava Statistical Region.

The local church is dedicated to Our Lady of Sorrows and belongs to the Parish of Sveta Trojica–Podlehnik. The church was built between 1743 and 1773.
