= Dobrina, Žetale =

Dobrina
- Location in Slovenia
- Coordinates: 46°17′4.86″N 15°48′32.01″E
- Country: Slovenia
- Traditional region: Styria
- Statistical region: Drava
- Municipality: Žetale

Area
  - Total: 6.87 km^{2} (2.65 sq mi)
- Elevation: 267 m (876 ft)

Population (2002)
  - Total: 272

Dobrina (pronounced [dɔˈbɾiːna]) is a settlement in the Haloze Hills in the Municipality of Žetale in eastern Slovenia. It is made up of several smaller dispersed hamlets: Dobrina, Dobrinska Gorca, Globočec, Hrastov Vrh, Laze, Male Prekože, Podpeč, Rapače, Reber, Spodnje Ravno, Strajna, Temnjak, Velike Prekože, Veliki Vrh, Zgornje Ravno, and Žale. The area is part of the traditional region of Styria. It is now included in the Drava Statistical Region.
