= Lozina =

Lozina may refer to:

- Ložina, a settlement in Slovenia
- Łozina, a village in Poland
- Luka Lozina (born 1995), Croatian water polo player
