= Mount Saint Donatus =

Mountain in Slovenia

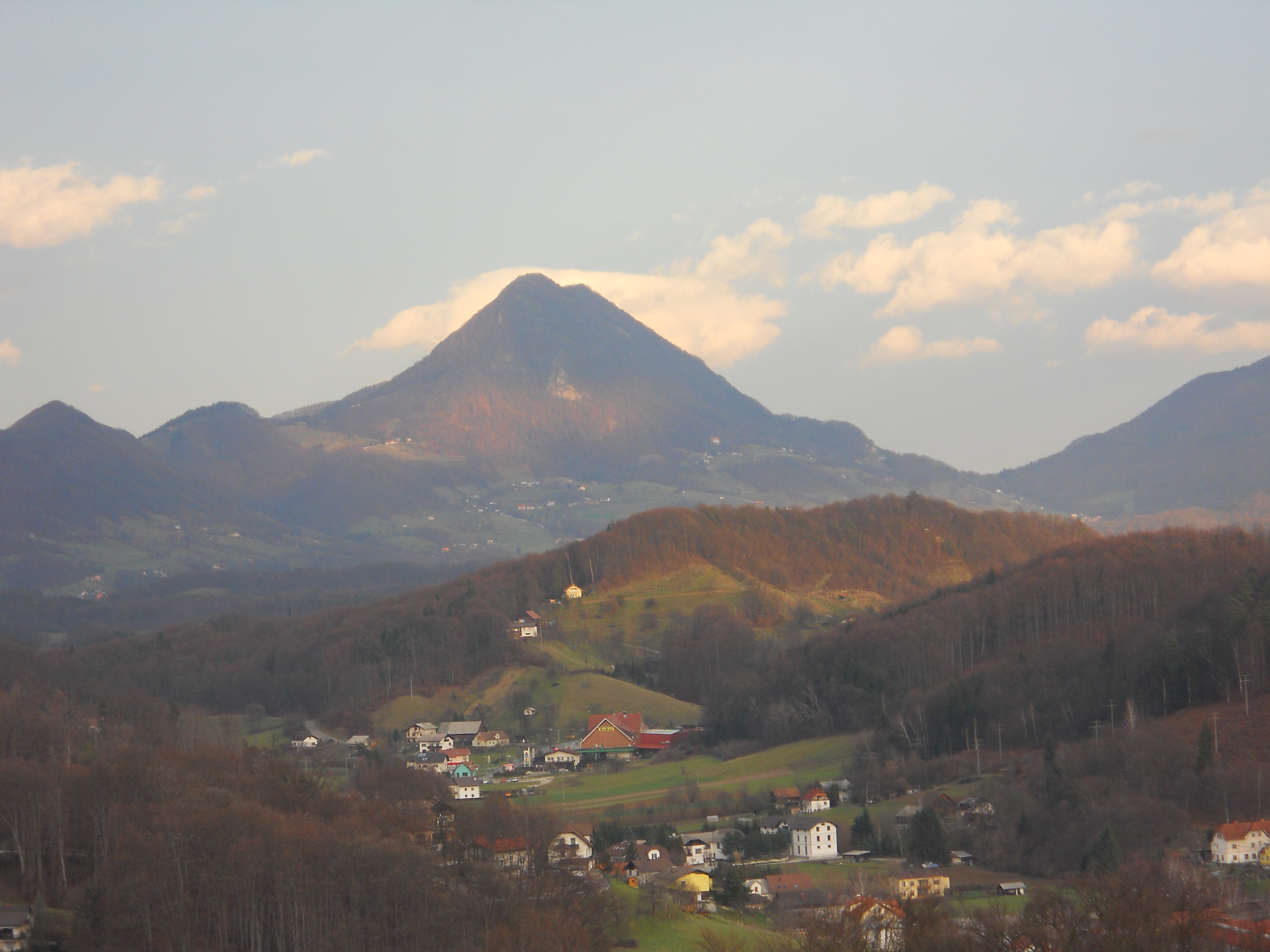

Highest point
- Elevation: 882 m (2,894 ft)
- Coordinates: 46°15′22.58″N 15°43′19.81″E

Naming
- Native name: Donačka gora (Slovene)

Geography
- Location within Alps
- Location: Slovenia
- Parent range: Karawanks

Mount Saint Donatus (Slovene: Donačka gora) also known as Mount Rogatec (Slovene: Rogaška gora), elevation 882 meters (2,894 ft), is a mountain in eastern Slovenia. It is among the easternmost peaks in the Karawanks, which extend to Mount Ivanšćica in Croatia.

== Name ==
The older names for the mountain—Mount Rogatec (Rogaška gora) or Rogač—are probably related to the hornlike shape of the mountain; viewed from Rogaška Slatina from the west, it is a sharp, rocky peak. In the geographical sense, the Slovene common noun rog 'horn' also means 'tall rocky prominence'. The modern name of the mountain, which came into use in the 19th century, is derived from a church dedicated to Saint Donatus.

== History ==
Archaeological findings beneath Mount Saint Donatus reveal evidence of ancient human habitation, including Neolithic stone axes, a bronze axe from around 1000 BC, and Celtic artifacts. A section of a late antique necropolis, containing sarcophagi, was discovered on a terrace near the mountain's peak. During the Roman era, the mountain was known as Mons Claudii, named after a prominent military leader. A mithraeum once stood at the summit, now marked by a cross. The mountain served as a watchtower during Ottoman invasions, where bonfires were used to signal danger.

Between 1720 and 1730, a wooden church was built on the south slope of the mountain at an elevation of 511 meters (1,677 ft). This original church was destroyed on 6 August 1741 when it was hit by a lightning; 59 people died in the accident. The present church was built from 1756 to 1780. It features east–west orientation, a rounded nave, wooden facade towers, and a sacristy. The nave was vaulted in 1843. There are three side altars and oil paintings by Jožef Anton Lerchinger from Rogatec in the interior.

== Geography ==
Mount Saint Donatus rises steeply from its foothills to a short, sharp ridge of varying elevation. The mountain has three peaks, the highest being the westernmost, the middle one (735 m or 2,411 ft) being called Resenik, and the lowest one (616 m or 2,021 ft) being called Ženčaj. The easternmost peak has a rocky precipice of about 40 to 70 metres (130 to 230 ft) on the north and south sides. The ridge offers a very good view and is therefore a popular hiking destination, especially for residents of nearby Rogaška Slatina and Rogatec. The south and west slopes are less steep. The settlements of Donačka Gora, Tlake, and Sveti Jurij with small vineyards and orchards have developed here.

== Geology ==
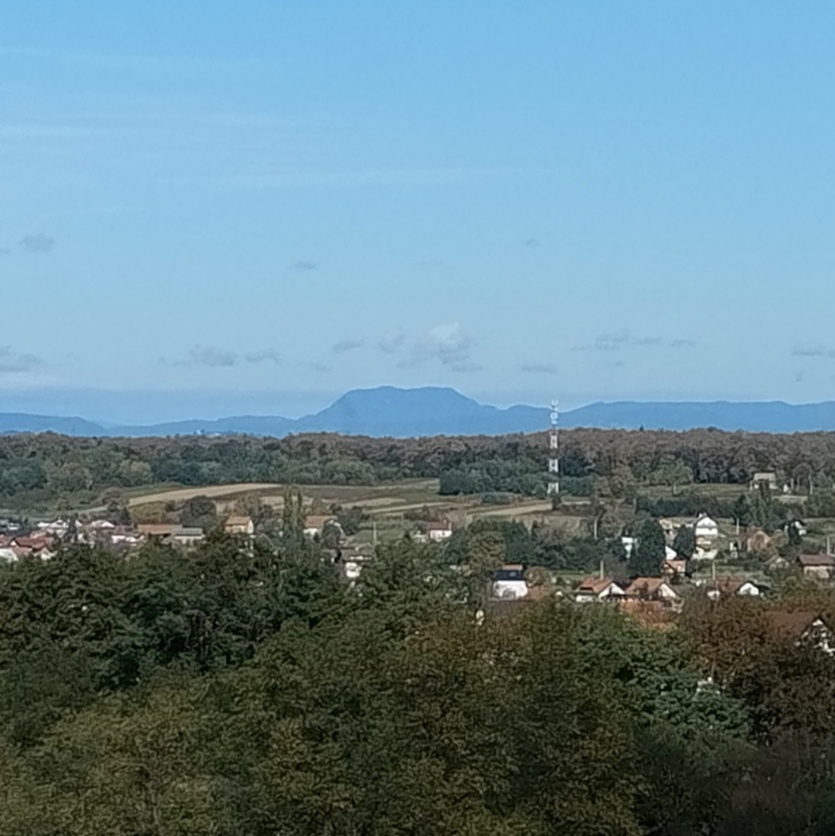
Mount Saint Donatus as seen from Bistra, Croatia

The mountain's ridge consists of Lithothamnion limestone and quartz sandstone. This geological formation was the last to rise from the Pannonian Sea. The base is made up of soft Tertiary rocks, mainly marl.

In the foothills of Mount Saint Donatus there are around 40 abandoned quarries of quartz sandstone, which was used in the past centuries for the construction of houses (portals, stairs), chapels and statues, and was also used to make sharpening stones which was still an important activity in the last century. After 1956, this activity died out.

== Flora and fauna ==
There is a beech forest reserve measuring 27.78 ha (68.6 acres) on the northern slope of Mount Saint Donatus. It has been protected since 1965. The southern side is covered by heat-loving Fraxinus ornus and Ostrya carpinifolia. Rock outcrops on the mountain's sunny side are the only known growing place of Sempervivum juvanii in Slovenia. It is also the only growing place of Dianthus plumarius subsp. hoppei in Slovenia. Sandstones of Mount Saint Donatus are the easternmost growing site of Primus auricula. Of the animals, the mountain is the living place of deer, wild boar, chamois and a wide variety of birds.

== Trails ==
Ernest Frölich, a Vienna physician working in Rogaška Slatina, laid the first marked mountain trail in Slovenia on Mount Saint Donatus in 1853. There are several access points to the mountain: from Naraplje, from Žetale (the Jože of Žetale Trail was laid in 1975), from Stoperce (the Stoperce Trail), from Rogatec, from where an asphalted road leads to Rudi Lodge at 590 m (1,940 ft) a.s.l. - 6 km) at the saddle between Ženčaj and Mount Saint Donatus. The road was expanded in 1977. The lodge was built from 1976 to 1984. In 1988, it was named after local cultural and sports worker Rudi Lebič (1929–1984),

From Rudi Lodge, a serpentine mountain trail leads through the primeval forest area to a ridge and a peak with a 10 metres (33 ft) high cross, which was first erected in 1934, blown up in 1952 and rebuilt in 1992. The hike takes about one hour. The trail continues over the ridge either towards Mount Macelj or along a few steel cables back to the mountain lodge.
