= Korenjak =

Korenjak may refer to:

- Korenjak, Zavrč, a village in Slovenia
- Korenjak, Croatia, a village near Maruševec, Croatia
- Jurij Korenjak, Slovene slalom canoeist
