= Koritno =

Koritno may refer to:

- Koritno, Bled, a settlement in Upper Carniola, Slovenia
- Koritno, Brežice, a village in eastern Slovenia
- Koritno, Majšperk, a settlement near Breg, northeastern Slovenia
- Koritno, Oplotnica, a settlement in eastern Slovenia
