= Goričak =

- Location in Slovenia
- Coordinates: 46°22′4.85″N 16°3′48.29″E
- Country: Slovenia
- Traditional region: Styria
- Statistical region: Drava
- Municipality: Zavrč

Area
  - Total: 1.74 km^{2} (0.67 sq mi)
- Elevation: 231.3 m (759 ft)

Population (2002)
  - Total: 168

Goričak (pronounced [ˈɡoːɾitʃak]) is a settlement in the Municipality of Zavrč in the Haloze area of eastern Slovenia, right on the border with Croatia. The area is part of the traditional region of Styria. It is now included in the Drava Statistical Region.
