= Dežno =

Dežno may refer to one of two places in Slovenia:

- Dežno pri Makolah
- Dežno pri Podlehniku
