= Jelovice =

Jelovice may refer to:

- Jelovice, Slovenia, a village near Majšperk
- Jelovice, Croatia, a village near Lanišće
