= Podlože =

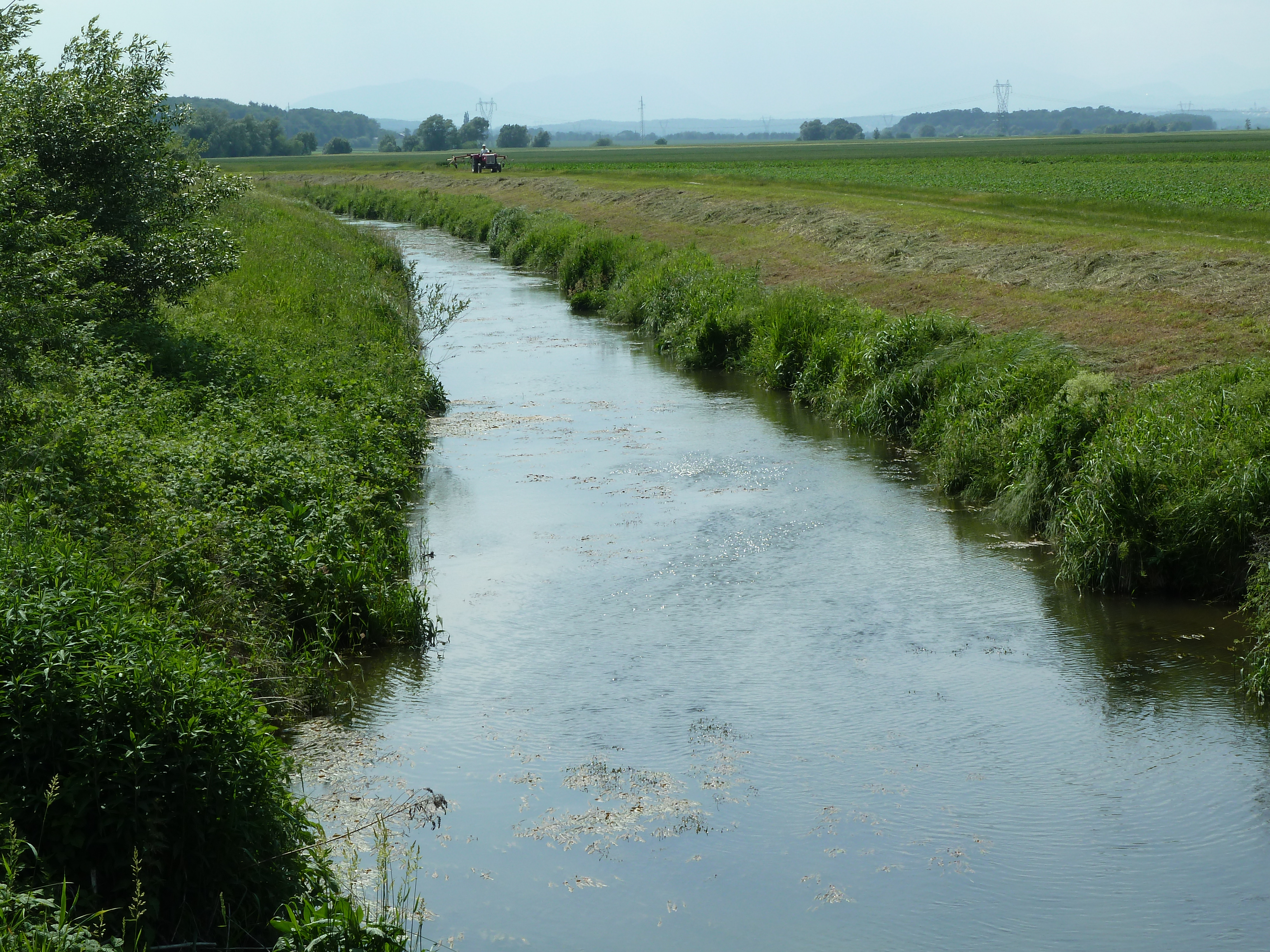

- Location in Slovenia
- Coordinates: 46°21′38.92″N 15°44′27.64″E
- Country: Slovenia
- Traditional region: Styria
- Statistical region: Drava
- Municipality: Majšperk

Area
  - Total: 6.17 km^{2} (2.38 sq mi)
- Elevation: 250 m (820 ft)

Population (2020)
  - Total: 267

Podlože (pronounced [ˈpoːdlɔʒɛ]) is a settlement in the Municipality of Majšperk in northeastern Slovenia. It lies north of Majšperk on the regional road to Ptuj. The area is part of the traditional region of Styria. It is now included with the rest of the municipality in the Drava Statistical Region.

== History ==
The settlement also has a prehistoric mound cemetery from the 7th and 6th centuries BC.
