= Drenovec, Zavrč =

Drenovec
- Location in Slovenia
- Coordinates: 46°20′46.63″N 16°4′26.15″E
- Country: Slovenia
- Traditional region: Styria
- Statistical region: Drava
- Municipality: Zavrč

Area
  - Total: 0.77 km^{2} (0.30 sq mi)
- Elevation: 284.3 m (933 ft)

Population (2002)
  - Total: 62

Drenovec (pronounced [ˈdɾeːnɔʋəts]) is a small settlement in the Municipality of Zavrč in the Haloze area of eastern Slovenia. It lies in the hills in the southeastern extremes of the municipality, right on the border with Croatia. The area is part of the traditional region of Styria. It is now included in the Drava Statistical Region.
