= Belski Vrh =

- Location in Slovenia
- Coordinates: 46°21′45.66″N 16°1′21.1″E
- Country: Slovenia
- Traditional region: Styria
- Statistical region: Drava
- Municipality: Zavrč

Area
  - Total: 1.39 km^{2} (0.54 sq mi)
- Elevation: 310.1 m (1,017 ft)

Population (2002)
  - Total: 63

Belski Vrh (pronounced [ˈbeːlski ˈʋəɾx], German: Welschaberg) is a settlement in the Municipality of Zavrč in the Haloze area of eastern Slovenia. The area is part of the traditional region of Styria. It is now included in the Drava Statistical Region.

The local church was destroyed by lightning in the 19th century. It was dedicated to Saint Urban and was a Late Gothic building. Some remains of the church and a nearby keep are still visible.
