= Grdina =

- Location in Slovenia
- Coordinates: 46°17′34.75″N 15°43′28.73″E
- Country: Slovenia
- Traditional region: Styria
- Statistical region: Drava
- Municipality: Majšperk

Area
  - Total: 3.38 km^{2} (1.31 sq mi)
- Elevation: 280.7 m (921 ft)

Population (2002)
  - Total: 129

Grdina (pronounced [ˈɡəɾdina]) is a largely dispersed settlement in the Haloze Hills in the Municipality of Majšperk in northeastern Slovenia. There is a small core to the settlement at the confluence of Gabrščica and Skralška creeks. The area is part of the traditional region of Styria. It is now included with the rest of the municipality in the Drava Statistical Region.
