= Gorenjski Vrh =

- Location in Slovenia
- Coordinates: 46°21′30.13″N 16°1′54.97″E
- Country: Slovenia
- Traditional region: Styria
- Statistical region: Drava
- Municipality: Zavrč

Area
  - Total: 1.79 km^{2} (0.69 sq mi)
- Elevation: 338.6 m (1,111 ft)

Population (2002)
  - Total: 83

Gorenjski Vrh (pronounced [ɡɔˈɾeːnski ˈʋəɾx], German: Gorenzenberg) is a settlement in the Municipality of Zavrč in the Haloze area of eastern Slovenia. The area is part of the traditional region of Styria. It is now included in the Drava Statistical Region.

The local church is dedicated to John the Baptist and belongs to the Parish of Zavrč. It dates to the second half of the 17th century.
