= Sedlašek =

- Location in Slovenia
- Coordinates: 46°18′15.27″N 15°52′38.41″E
- Country: Slovenia
- Traditional region: Styria
- Statistical region: Drava
- Municipality: Podlehnik

Area
  - Total: 6.22 km^{2} (2.40 sq mi)
- Elevation: 360.6 m (1,183 ft)

Population (2002)
  - Total: 221

Sedlašek (pronounced [ˈseːdlaʃək], German: Sedlaschek) is a village in the Municipality of Podlehnik. It lies in the Haloze region of eastern Slovenia. The area belongs to the traditional Styria region. It is now included in the Drava Statistical Region.
