= Spodnje Gruškovje =

- Location in Slovenia
- Coordinates: 46°19′49.2″N 15°54′1.27″E
- Country: Slovenia
- Traditional region: Styria
- Statistical region: Drava
- Municipality: Podlehnik

Area
  - Total: 1.2 km^{2} (0.46 sq mi)
- Elevation: 331.3 m (1,087 ft)

Population (2002)
  - Total: 56

Spodnje Gruškovje (pronounced [ˈspoːdnjɛ ˈɡɾuːʃkɔu̯jɛ]) is a settlement in the Haloze Hills in the Municipality of Podlehnik in eastern Slovenia. The area is part of the traditional region of Styria. It is now included in the Drava Statistical Region.
