= Turški Vrh =

- Location in Slovenia
- Coordinates: 46°21′44.68″N 16°3′8.69″E
- Country: Slovenia
- Traditional region: Styria
- Statistical region: Drava
- Municipality: Zavrč

Area
  - Total: 4.21 km^{2} (1.63 sq mi)
- Elevation: 287.4 m (943 ft)

Population (2002)
  - Total: 280

Turški Vrh (pronounced [ˈtuːɾʃki ˈʋəɾx], German: Türkenberg) is a settlement in the Municipality of Zavrč in the Haloze area of eastern Slovenia. The area is part of the traditional region of Styria. It is now included in the Drava Statistical Region.

== Name ==
The name Turški Vrh literally means 'Turk Peak'; the name is explained as either being connected with Ottoman raids that occurred in the area or with a folk tradition that a Turkish midwife is buried behind a shrine at house number 20 in the village. Locally the village is known as Turski Vrh.

== Church ==
The local church on a hill in the south of the settlement, right on the border with Croatia, is dedicated to Saints Hermagoras and Fortunatus and belongs to the Parish of Zavrč. It dates to the second half of the 17th century.
