= Prlekija dialect =

Slovene dialect

The Prlekija dialect (Slovene: prleško narečje, prleščina) is a Slovene dialect in the Pannonian dialect group. It is spoken in the Prlekija region, southwest of the Mura River, bounded on the north by a line from Radenci to Zlatoličje to Spodnja Polskava, on the west from there to Majšperk, and then on the south along the Dravinja and Drava rivers to the Croatian border.

== Phonological and morphological characteristics ==
The Prlekija dialect often has short vowels corresponding to long acute vowels in the standard language. Accentual retraction (in comparison to standard Slovene) is common. The dialect does not have diphthongs and is characterized by a: > ɔ, u > ü, vocalic ł > u, unaccented ě/i/u > i, word-final m > n, hardening of soft l, nʲ > j, and v > f before voiceless consonants and in word-final position. Salient lexemes in the dialect include dère (= ko 'when'), ka (= da 'that' or ker 'because'), and te (= tedaj 'then').
