= Strajna =

- Location in Slovenia
- Coordinates: 46°18′36.7″N 15°50′21.34″E
- Country: Slovenia
- Traditional region: Styria
- Statistical region: Drava
- Municipality: Podlehnik

Area
  - Total: 3.46 km^{2} (1.34 sq mi)
- Elevation: 396.2 m (1,300 ft)

Population (2002)
  - Total: 89

Strajna (pronounced [ˈstɾaːi̯na]) is a settlement in the Haloze Hills in the Municipality of Podlehnik in eastern Slovenia. The area is part of the traditional region of Styria. It is now included in the Drava Statistical Region.
