= Pestike =

- Location in Slovenia
- Coordinates: 46°20′42.25″N 16°1′49.39″E
- Country: Slovenia
- Traditional region: Styria
- Statistical region: Drava
- Municipality: Zavrč

Area
  - Total: 1.36 km^{2} (0.53 sq mi)
- Elevation: 268 m (879 ft)

Population (2002)
  - Total: 100

Pestike (pronounced [pɛˈstiːkɛ], German: Pestikenberg) is a small settlement in the Municipality of Zavrč in the Haloze area of eastern Slovenia. It lies in the hills close to the border with Croatia. The area is part of the traditional region of Styria. It is now included in the Drava Statistical Region.
