= Kočice =

- Location in Slovenia
- Coordinates: 46°18′35.65″N 15°47′31.18″E
- Country: Slovenia
- Traditional region: Styria
- Statistical region: Drava
- Municipality: Žetale

Area
  - Total: 6.45 km^{2} (2.49 sq mi)
- Elevation: 346.9 m (1,138 ft)

Population (2002)
  - Total: 260

Kočice (pronounced [ˈkoːtʃitsɛ]) is a settlement in the Haloze Hills in the Municipality of Žetale in eastern Slovenia. It is made up of several smaller dispersed hamlets: Boriče, Dobavsko, Jurovski Vrh, Kočice, Krošlji Vrh, Laze, Peklače, Plajnsko, Potni Vrh, Pšetna Graba, Šardinje, Tkavc, Vildon, Vinarje, Zadnje, and Zalopata. The area is part of the traditional region of Styria. It is now included in the Drava Statistical Region.
