= Municipality of Zavrč =

Municipality of Slovenia

Municipality of Zavrč Občina Zavrč
- Municipality
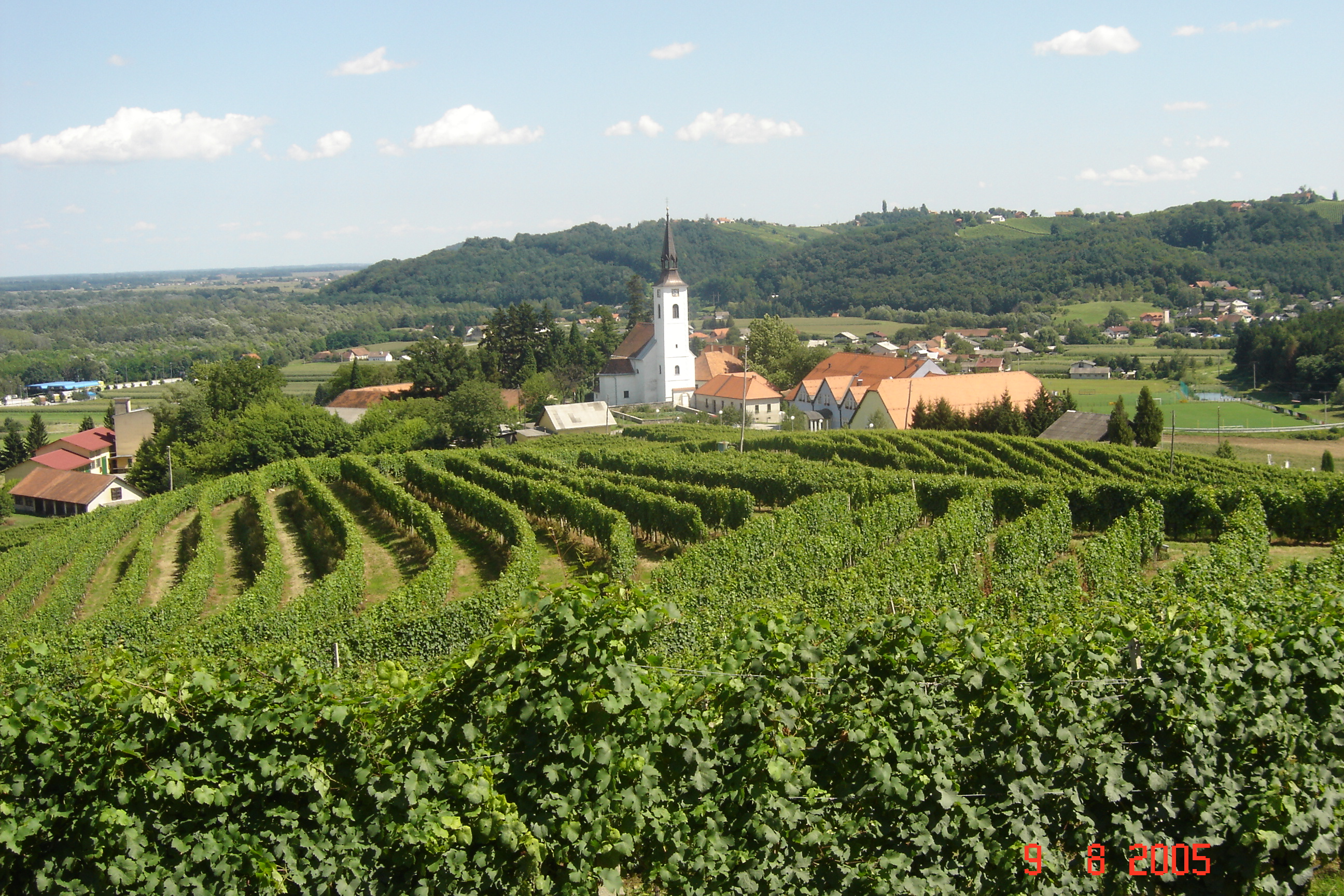

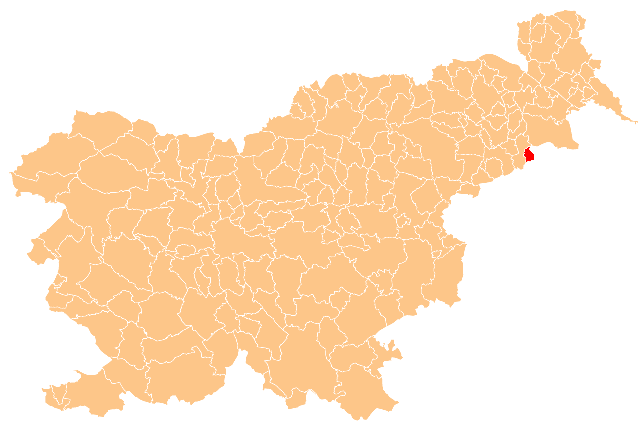
- Location of the Municipality of Zavrč in Slovenia
- Coordinates: 46°21′30″N 16°02′45″E
- Country: Slovenia

Government
  - Mayor: Slavko Pravdič

Area
  - Total: 19.3 km^{2} (7.5 sq mi)

Population (2018)
  - Total: 1,768
  - Density: 91.6/km^{2} (237/sq mi)
- Time zone: UTC+01 (CET)
  - Summer (DST): UTC+02 (CEST)
- Website: www.zavrc.si

The Municipality of Zavrč (pronounced [ˈzaːʋəɾtʃ]; Slovene: Občina Zavrč) is a municipality in the Haloze area of Slovenia, on the border with Croatia. Its seat is the village of Zavrč. The area is part of the traditional region of Styria. The municipality is now included in the Drava Statistical Region.

== Settlements ==
In addition to the namesake town, the municipality also includes the following settlements:

- Belski Vrh
- Drenovec
- Gorenjski Vrh
- Goričak
- Hrastovec
- Korenjak
- Pestike
- Turški Vrh
