= Lešje, Majšperk =

Lešje
- Location in Slovenia
- Coordinates: 46°20′39.42″N 15°43′21.82″E
- Country: Slovenia
- Traditional region: Styria
- Statistical region: Drava
- Municipality: Majšperk

Area
  - Total: 2.29 km^{2} (0.88 sq mi)
- Elevation: 247.5 m (812 ft)

Population (2002)
  - Total: 180

Lešje (pronounced [ˈleːʃjɛ]) is a settlement on the left bank of the Dravinja River west of Majšperk in northeastern Slovenia. The area is part of the traditional region of Styria. It is now included with the rest of the Municipality of Majšperk in the Drava Statistical Region. The valley is dominated by meadows and fields, which are used for livestock and agriculture.
