= Planjsko, Majšperk =

Planjsko
- Location in Slovenia
- Coordinates: 46°18′49.19″N 15°46′5.37″E
- Country: Slovenia
- Traditional region: Styria
- Statistical region: Drava
- Municipality: Majšperk

Area
  - Total: 1.78 km^{2} (0.69 sq mi)
- Elevation: 267.9 m (879 ft)

Population (2020)
  - Total: 48

Planjsko (pronounced [ˈplaːnskɔ]) is a dispersed settlement in the Haloze Hills in the Municipality of Majšperk in northeastern Slovenia. The area is part of the traditional region of Styria. It is now included with the rest of the municipality in the Drava Statistical Region.

== Geography ==
It lies on slopes in the forested hills of the Haloze region. Jesenica Creek flows through a valley in the settlement.
