= Stanečka Vas =

- Location in Slovenia
- Coordinates: 46°20′22.37″N 15°44′43.9″E
- Country: Slovenia
- Traditional region: Styria
- Statistical region: Drava
- Municipality: Majšperk

Area
  - Total: 0.78 km^{2} (0.30 sq mi)
- Elevation: 240.1 m (788 ft)

Population (2020)
  - Total: 91

Stanečka Vas (pronounced [ˈstaːnɛtʃka ˈʋaːs] or [staˈneːtʃka ˈʋaːs]; Slovene: Stanečka vas) is a settlement in the Municipality of Majšperk in northeastern Slovenia. It lies on the left bank of the Dravinja River on the regional road leading from Majšperk to Jurovci. The area is part of the traditional region of Styria. It is currently included with the rest of the municipality in the Drava Statistical Region.
