= Koritno, Majšperk =

Koritno
- Location in Slovenia
- Coordinates: 46°20′4.89″N 15°43′1.26″E
- Country: Slovenia
- Traditional region: Styria
- Statistical region: Drava
- Municipality: Majšperk

Area
  - Total: 0.94 km^{2} (0.36 sq mi)
- Elevation: 250.5 m (822 ft)

Population (2002)
  - Total: 76

Koritno (pronounced [kɔˈɾiːtnɔ]) is a settlement on the right bank of the Dravinja River west of Breg in the Municipality of Majšperk in northeastern Slovenia. The area is part of the traditional region of Styria. It is now included with the rest of the municipality in the Drava Statistical Region.
