= Stoperce =

- Location in Slovenia
- Coordinates: 46°17′14.77″N 15°42′21.65″E
- Country: Slovenia
- Traditional region: Styria
- Statistical region: Drava
- Municipality: Majšperk

Area
  - Total: 7.61 km^{2} (2.94 sq mi)
- Elevation: 395.9 m (1,299 ft)

Population (2020)
  - Total: 185

Stoperce (pronounced [ˈstoːpɛɾtsɛ], in older sources also Stoprce, German: Stoperzen) is a settlement in the Municipality of Majšperk in northeastern Slovenia. The area is part of the traditional region of Styria. It is now included with the rest of the municipality in the Drava Statistical Region.

Stoperce lies in the valley of Skralska Creek. It has a small population center with a primary school, post office, and commercial and catering facilities. Some historical buildings (black kitchen and wine cellar) have also been preserved. There is also a cemetery and a monument to the fallen in the World War II. The valley is dominated by meadows and fields, and there are some orchards on the slopes. A large part of the village is also overgrown with forests.

From Stoperce there are also several paths to Mount Saint Donatus.

The parish church in the settlement is dedicated to Saint Anthony the Hermit. It was built in the 17th century.
