= Čermožiše =

- Location in Slovenia
- Coordinates: 46°16′18.16″N 15°47′7.25″E
- Country: Slovenia
- Traditional region: Styria
- Statistical region: Drava
- Municipality: Žetale

Area
  - Total: 7.74 km^{2} (2.99 sq mi)
- Elevation: 380.3 m (1,248 ft)

Population (2002)
  - Total: 290

Čermožiše (pronounced [tʃɛɾmɔˈʒiːʃɛ]) is a settlement in the Haloze Hills in the Municipality of Žetale in eastern Slovenia. The area is part of the traditional region of Styria. It is now included in the Drava Statistical Region.

There are two churches in the settlement. One, a pilgrimage church on a hill above the settlement, is dedicated to the Virgin Mary. It was built between 1716 and 1723. The second is dedicated to Saint Sebastian and stands by the road just outside the main settlement. It dates to the early 16th century. Both belong to the Parish of Žetale.
