= Municipality of Žetale =

Municipality of Slovenia

Municipality of Žetale Občina Žetale
- Municipality
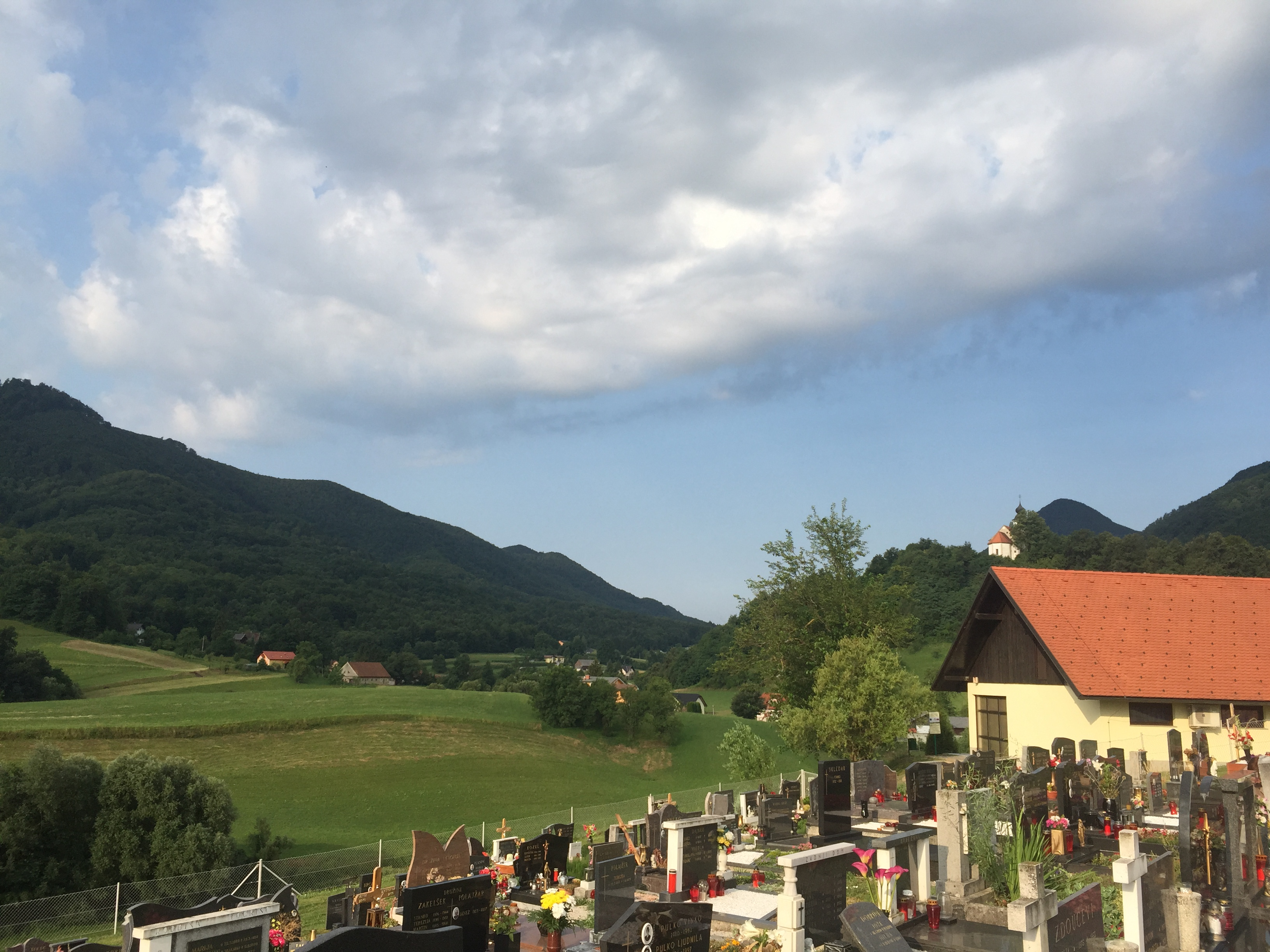

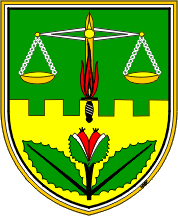
- Coat of arms

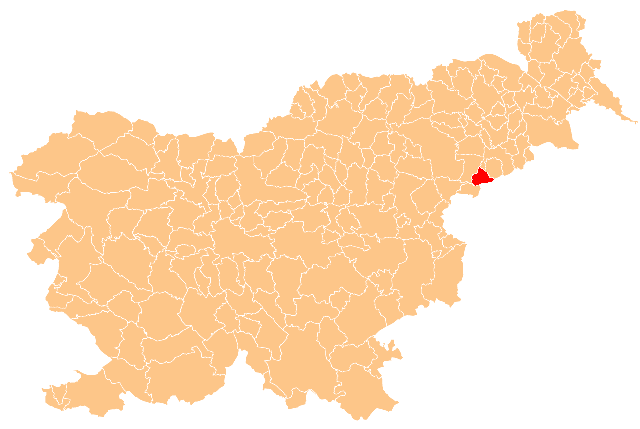
- Location of the Municipality of Žetale in Slovenia
- Coordinates: 46°16′N 15°48′E
- Country: Slovenia

Government
  - Mayor: Anton Butolen

Area
  - Total: 38 km^{2} (15 sq mi)

Population (2002)
  - Total: 1,364
  - Density: 36/km^{2} (93/sq mi)
- Time zone: UTC+01 (CET)
  - Summer (DST): UTC+02 (CEST)
- Website: www.zetale.si

The Municipality of Žetale (pronounced [ʒɛˈtaːlɛ]; Slovene: Občina Žetale) is a municipality in eastern Slovenia, on the border with Croatia. Its seat is the village of Žetale. The area is part of the traditional region of Styria. The municipality is now included in the Drava Statistical Region.

== Flag and coat of Arms ==
The flag and coat of arms of Žetale are a principally green and yellow design, featuring sweet chestnut leaves and fruit. Above it on the coat of arms is a castle embattlement upon which stands the flaming sword and scales of the Archangel Michael.

== Geography ==
The Municipality of Žetale has an area of 38 km^{2} (15 sq mi) in the Drava Statistical Region. It consists of the villages of Žetale, Čermožiše, Dobrina, Kočice, and Nadole, with a total population of 1,364.

== Nearby attractions ==
The Jože of Žetale Hiking Trail (Slovene: Pot Jožeta Žetalskega) with a precipice on the north side leads from Žetale to Donačka Gora, passing Resenik Hill and Medgorje to the eastern third peak. The views available include the forested slopes of Mount Macelj (Slovene: Maceljska gora), Resenik Hill, Žetale, the vineyards of Haloze, and the church of Mary Help of Christians (Slovene: Marija pomočnica).

== Churches ==
The Žetale Valley has a number of churches. Saint Sebastian's Church (Slovene: Sv. Boštjan), dating to 1415, was built in memory of victims of the plague. Nearby is the pilgrimage Church of Mary Help of Christians (Slovene: Marija pomočnica) from 1725. Archangel Michael's Church from 1426 stands in Žetale.
