= Bolečka Vas =

- Location in Slovenia
- Coordinates: 46°20′49.49″N 15°48′7.73″E
- Country: Slovenia
- Traditional region: Styria
- Statistical region: Drava
- Municipality: Majšperk

Area
  - Total: 2.03 km^{2} (0.78 sq mi)
- Elevation: 236.7 m (777 ft)

Population (2002)
  - Total: 53

Bolečka Vas (pronounced [bɔˈleːtʃka ˈʋaːs]; Slovene: Bolečka vas) is a settlement on the left bank of the Dravinja River in the Municipality of Majšperk in northeastern Slovenia. The area is part of the traditional region of Styria. It is now included with the rest of the municipality in the Drava Statistical Region.

== Geography ==
In the valley, there are mostly fields in the meadows.

== Name ==
Bolečka Vas was attested in written sources in 1440 as Welitschezdorff. The name is derived from the possessive adjective form of the Slavic personal name *Boľę and thus originally means 'Boľę's village'.

== History and economy ==
Until 1998, the village belonged to the Municipality of Videm, and later to Majšperk. It belongs to the local community of Dolena. It is the location of the F.D. Rožmarin Dolena folklore society, a women's active, sports association, ethnographic association, folk singers, and pensioners' association. The main industries are agriculture, animal husbandry, forestry, catering, viticulture, and trucking.
