= Naraplje =

- Location in Slovenia
- Coordinates: 46°19′24.01″N 15°45′41.08″E
- Country: Slovenia
- Traditional region: Styria
- Statistical region: Drava
- Municipality: Majšperk

Area
  - Total: 2.4 km^{2} (0.93 sq mi)
- Elevation: 246.7 m (809 ft)

Population (2020)
  - Total: 102

Naraplje (pronounced [ˈnaːɾapljɛ]) is a settlement in the Municipality of Majšperk in northeastern Slovenia. It lies in the western Haloze Hills in the valley of Jesenica Creek, a minor right tributary of the Dravinja River. The area is part of the traditional region of Styria. It is now included with the rest of the municipality in the Drava Statistical Region.

== Geography ==
There are vineyards on the slopes and forests higher up.
