= Majšperk Castle =

Coordinates: 46°21′3.92″N 15°44′7.96″E

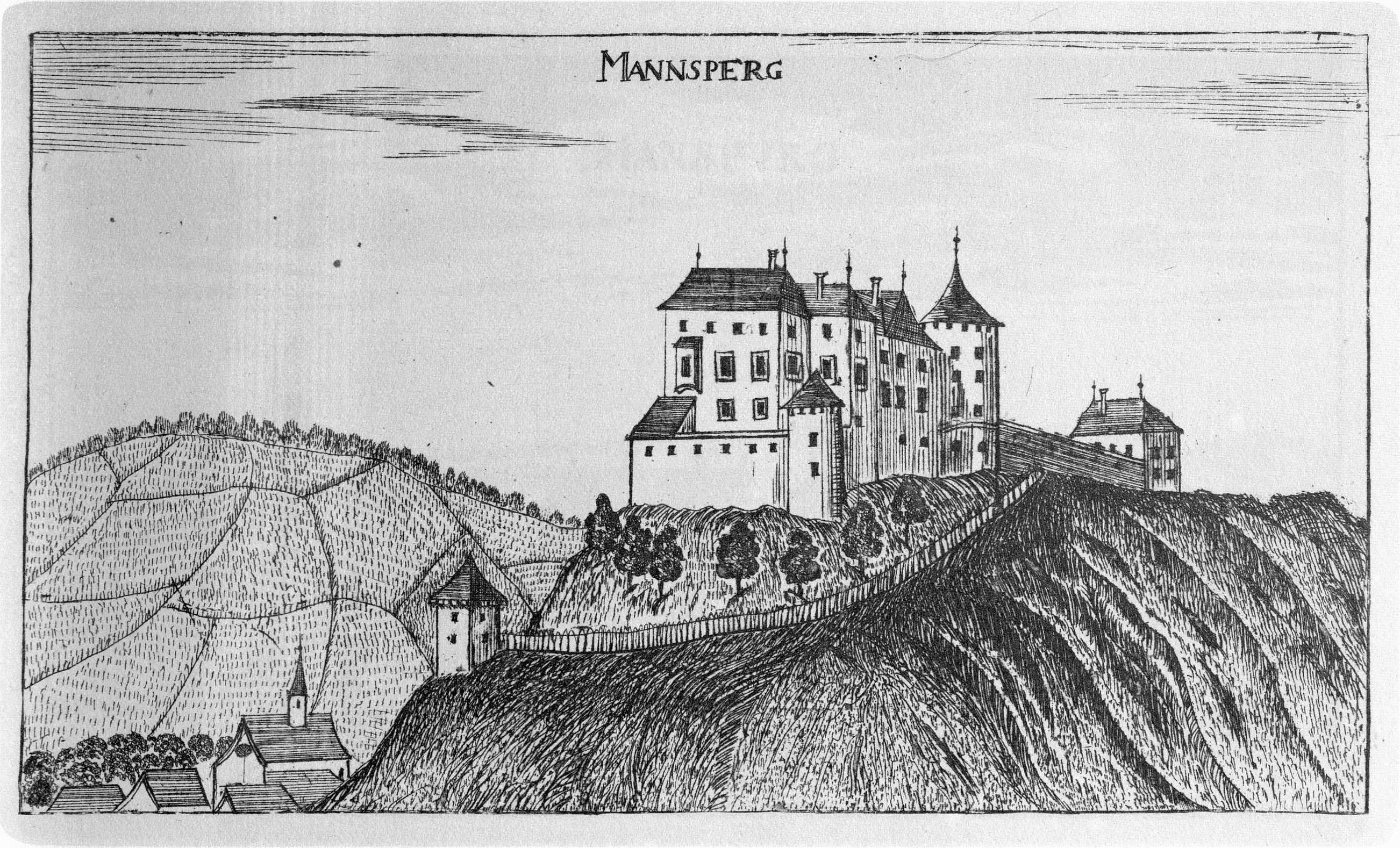
Majšperk Castle as depicted by Georg Matthäus Vischer in the 17th-century

Majšperk Castle (Slovene: Grad Majšperk, German: Schloss Monsperg) is a ruined castle near Majšperk, Slovenia.

== History ==
The castle's architectural features date it to the 13th century; it is first mentioned in 1256, under the Latin name castrum Mannesperch. Later, the name is given differently, as vest vnd turn Mannesperch and geslos Monsperg in 1340 and 1478, respectively. In 1635, the castle fell to a peasant revolt and was burned; it burned down again in 1695, but was each time rebuilt. Through the years, the castle belonged to several noble families, including the houses of Moscon, Jurič, and Hohenwart. In 1885, the castle had been uninhabited for years and was already in a state of severe disrepair; by the end of the 19th century, much of it had collapsed. The remains of the castle consist largely of the north wall; traces of the defensive wall and ditch are also visible.
