= Spodnja Sveča =

- Location in Slovenia
- Coordinates: 46°19′30.19″N 15°43′7.82″E
- Country: Slovenia
- Traditional region: Styria
- Statistical region: Drava
- Municipality: Majšperk

Area
  - Total: 1.72 km^{2} (0.66 sq mi)
- Elevation: 247.2 m (811 ft)

Population (2020)
  - Total: 53

Spodnja Sveča (pronounced [ˈspoːdnja ˈsʋeːtʃa]) is a settlement on the right bank of the Dravinja River in the Municipality of Majšperk in northeastern Slovenia. It lies at the confluence of Dežnica Creek with Skralska Creek, a minor right tributary of the Dravinja. The area is part of the traditional region of Styria. It is now included with the rest of the municipality in the Drava Statistical Region. The place was once known for its weaving mill and quarry.

== History ==
Spodnja Sveča became a separate settlement in 1974, when the former village of Sveča was divided into this village and neighboring Zgornja Sveča.
