= Ložina =

- Location in Slovenia
- Coordinates: 46°17′32.66″N 15°54′23.33″E
- Country: Slovenia
- Traditional region: Styria
- Statistical region: Drava
- Municipality: Podlehnik

Area
  - Total: 2.85 km^{2} (1.10 sq mi)
- Elevation: 501.4 m (1,645 ft)

Population (2002)
  - Total: 40

Ložina (pronounced [lɔˈʒiːna]) is a settlement in the Haloze Hills in the Municipality of Podlehnik in eastern Slovenia, right on the border with Croatia. The area is part of the traditional region of Styria. It is now included in the Drava Statistical Region.
