= Zgornja Sveča =

- Location in Slovenia
- Coordinates: 46°18′26.42″N 15°43′1.84″E
- Country: Slovenia
- Traditional region: Styria
- Statistical region: Drava
- Municipality: Majšperk

Area
  - Total: 3.31 km^{2} (1.28 sq mi)
- Elevation: 264.3 m (867 ft)

Population (2002)
  - Total: 82

Zgornja Sveča (pronounced [ˈzɡoːɾnja ˈsʋeːtʃa]) is a settlement in the Municipality of Majšperk in northeastern Slovenia. It lies on the regional road from Majšperk to Rogatec. The area is part of the traditional region of Styria. It is now included with the rest of the municipality in the Drava Statistical Region.

== History ==
Zgornja Sveča became a separate settlement in 1974, when the former village of Sveča was divided into this village and neighboring Spodnja Sveča.
