= Doklece =

- Location in Slovenia
- Coordinates: 46°20′41.89″N 15°46′56.53″E
- Country: Slovenia
- Traditional region: Styria
- Statistical region: Drava
- Municipality: Majšperk

Area
  - Total: 2.93 km^{2} (1.13 sq mi)
- Elevation: 231.3 m (759 ft)

Population (2002)
  - Total: 93

Doklece (pronounced [dɔˈkleːtsɛ]) is a settlement along the road from Majšperk to Jurovci, on the left bank of the Dravinja River in the Municipality of Majšperk in northeastern Slovenia. The area is part of the traditional region of Styria. It is now included with the rest of the municipality in the Drava Statistical Region. The area is mostly meadows and pastures.
