= Korenjak, Zavrč =

Korenjak
- Location in Slovenia
- Coordinates: 46°20′47.06″N 16°2′29.7″E
- Country: Slovenia
- Traditional region: Styria
- Statistical region: Drava
- Municipality: Zavrč

Area
  - Total: 2.32 km^{2} (0.90 sq mi)
- Elevation: 296.1 m (971 ft)

Population (2002)
  - Total: 109

Korenjak (pronounced [kɔɾɛˈnjaːk]) is a settlement in the Municipality of Zavrč in the Haloze area of eastern Slovenia. It lies in the hills next to the border with Croatia. The area is part of the traditional region of Styria. It is now included in the Drava Statistical Region.
