= Dežno pri Podlehniku =

- Location in Slovenia
- Coordinates: 46°19′51.93″N 15°51′24.44″E
- Country: Slovenia
- Traditional region: Styria
- Statistical region: Drava
- Municipality: Podlehnik

Area
  - Total: 2.66 km^{2} (1.03 sq mi)
- Elevation: 245.7 m (806 ft)

Population (2002)
  - Total: 88

Dežno pri Podlehniku (pronounced [ˈdɛːʒnɔ pɾi pɔˈdleːxniku]) is a settlement in the Haloze Hills in the Municipality of Podlehnik in eastern Slovenia. The area is part of the traditional region of Styria. It is now included in the Drava Statistical Region.

== Name ==
The settlement was recorded in written sources in 1275 as in Dezzken and in 1440 as im ... Desachen, Deschene. The name is probably derived from the common noun deža 'squat round vessel', also used in the metaphorical sense 'hollow carved by water'. The name of the settlement was changed from Dežno to Dežno pri Podlehniku (literally, 'Dežno near Podlehnik') in 1953.
