= Municipality of Majšperk =

Municipality of Slovenia

Municipality of Majšperk Občina Majšperk
- Municipality
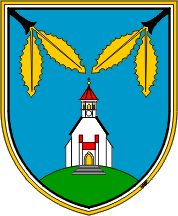
- Coat of arms

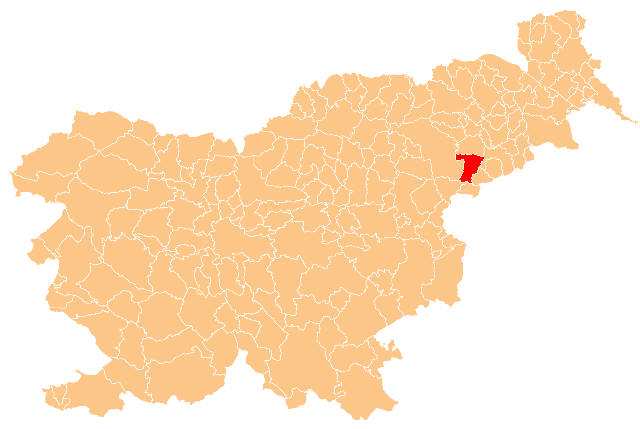
- Location of the Municipality of Majšperk in Slovenia
- Coordinates: 46°21′N 15°44′E
- Country: Slovenia

Government
  - Mayor: Darinka Fakin (Independent)

Area
  - Total: 72.8 km^{2} (28.1 sq mi)

Population (2002)
  - Total: 4,005
  - Density: 55.0/km^{2} (142/sq mi)
- Time zone: UTC+01 (CET)
  - Summer (DST): UTC+02 (CEST)
- Website: www.majsperk.si

The Municipality of Majšperk (Slovene: Občina Majšperk; pronounced [ˈóːptʃina ˈmaːi̯ʃpɛɾk]) is a municipality in northeastern Slovenia. The seat of the municipality is Majšperk. The area is part of the traditional region of Styria. The municipality is now included in the Drava Statistical Region.

== Settlements ==
In addition to the municipal seat of Majšperk, the municipality also includes the following settlements:

- Bolečka Vas
- Breg
- Doklece
- Dol pri Stopercah
- Grdina
- Janški Vrh
- Jelovice
- Koritno
- Kupčinji Vrh
- Lešje
- Medvedce
- Naraplje
- Planjsko
- Podlože
- Preša
- Ptujska Gora
- Sestrže
- Sitež
- Skrblje
- Slape
- Spodnja Sveča
- Stanečka Vas
- Stogovci
- Stoperce
- Zgornja Sveča
