= Slape =

- Location in Slovenia
- Coordinates: 46°20′26.39″N 15°46′1.59″E
- Country: Slovenia
- Traditional region: Styria
- Statistical region: Drava
- Municipality: Majšperk

Area
  - Total: 1.63 km^{2} (0.63 sq mi)
- Elevation: 230.7 m (757 ft)

Population (2002)
  - Total: 144

Slape (pronounced [ˈslaːpɛ]) is a settlement on the Dravinja River in the Municipality of Majšperk in northeastern Slovenia. There is also a dam and the only mill in the municipality. The area is part of the traditional region of Styria. It is now included with the rest of the municipality in the Drava Statistical Region.

In 1986 traces of a prehistoric Early Iron Age settlement were discovered in the area.
