= Stogovci, Majšperk =

Stogovci
- Location in Slovenia
- Coordinates: 46°20′28.64″N 15°45′15.32″E
- Country: Slovenia
- Traditional region: Styria
- Statistical region: Drava
- Municipality: Majšperk

Area
  - Total: 1.41 km^{2} (0.54 sq mi)
- Elevation: 241.4 m (792 ft)

Population (2020)
  - Total: 239

Stogovci (pronounced [ˈstoːɡɔu̯tsi]) is a settlement on the Dravinja River south of Ptujska Gora in the Municipality of Majšperk in northeastern Slovenia. The area is part of the traditional region of Styria. It is now included with the rest of the municipality in the Drava Statistical Region.
