= Nanos, Vipava =

Nanos Ravnik (until 1955)
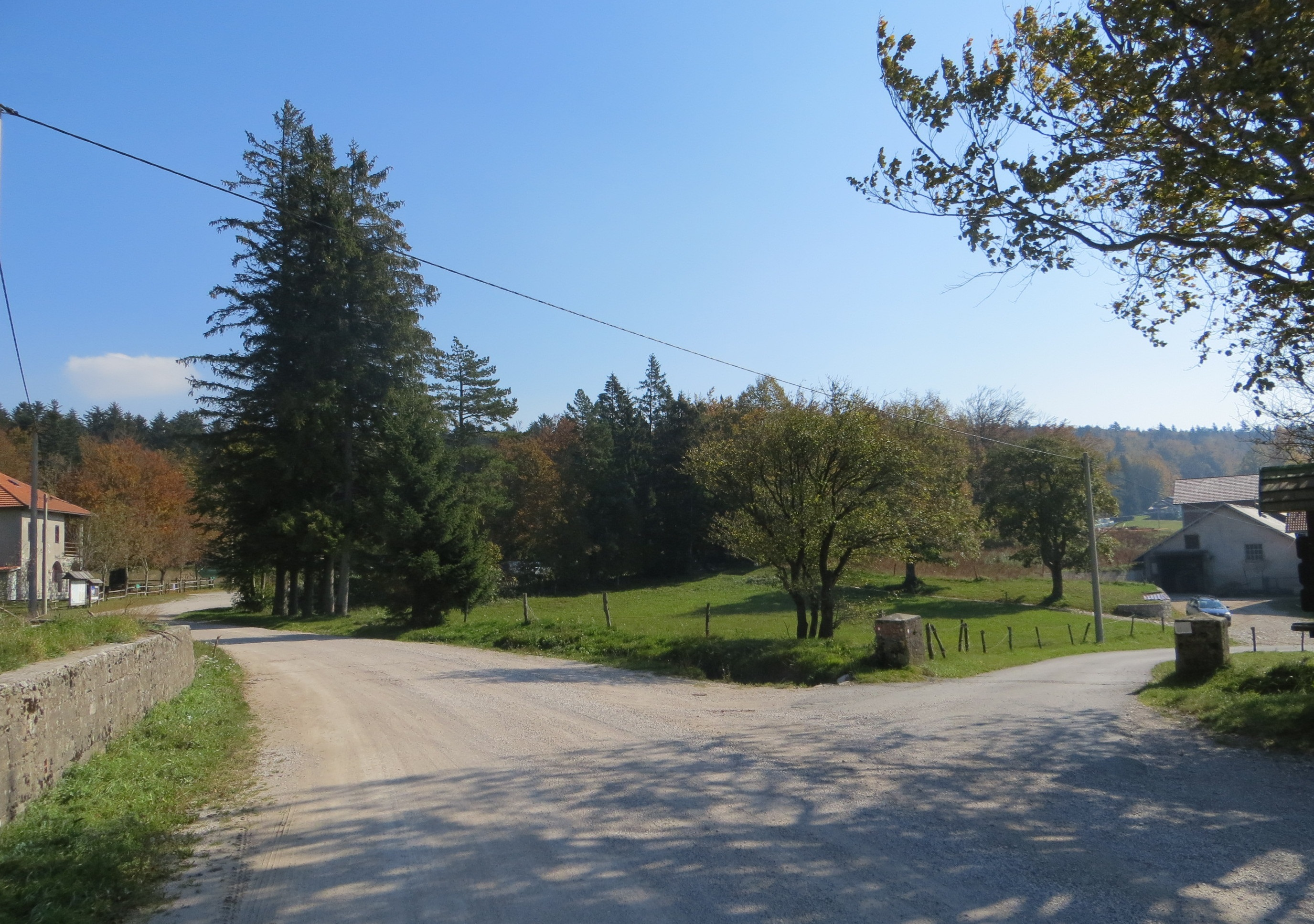

- Location in Slovenia
- Coordinates: 45°49′10.99″N 14°1′11.11″E
- Country: Slovenia
- Traditional region: Littoral
- Statistical region: Gorizia
- Municipality: Vipava

Area
  - Total: 38.09 km^{2} (14.71 sq mi)
- Elevation: 903.9 m (2,966 ft)

Population (2002)
  - Total: 9

Nanos (pronounced [ˈnaːnɔs]) is a dispersed settlement on Mount Nanos in the Municipality of Vipava in the Littoral region of Slovenia.

== Name ==
The name of the settlement was changed from Ravnik to Nanos in 1955.

== Church ==
The local church, built close to Pleša Peak on Mount Nanos, is dedicated to Saint Jerome and belongs to the Parish of Podnanos.
