= Podlehnik =

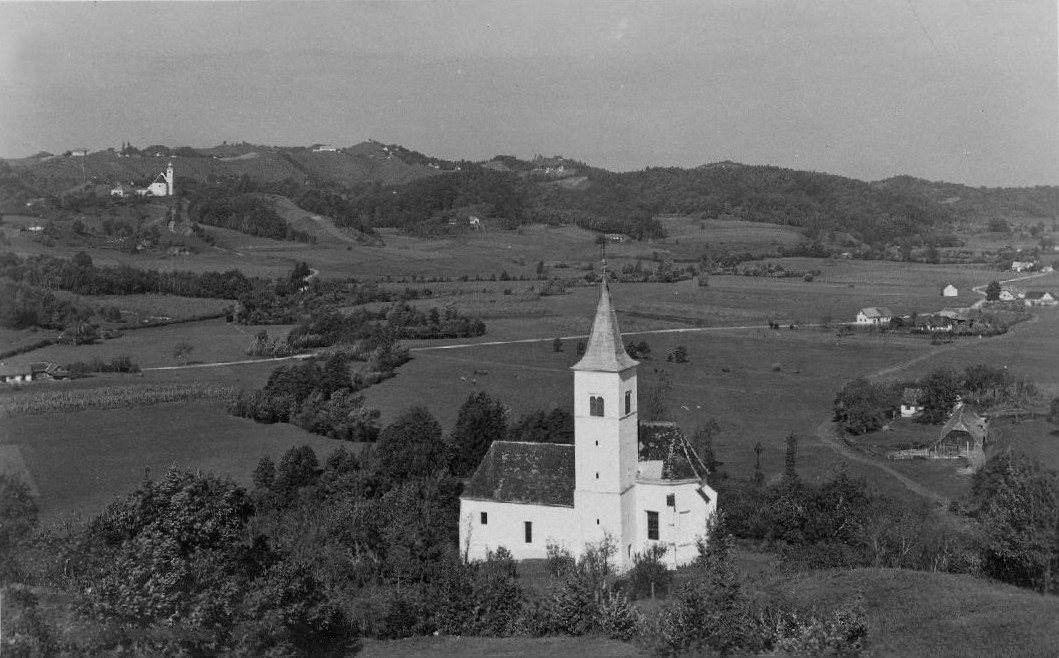

- Flag Coat of arms

- Location in Slovenia
- Coordinates: 46°20′10″N 15°52′43″E
- Country: Slovenia
- Traditional region: Styria
- Statistical region: Drava
- Municipality: Podlehnik

Area
  - Total: 4.19 km^{2} (1.62 sq mi)
- Elevation: 300.0 m (984.3 ft)

Population (2018)
  - Total: 378

Podlehnik (pronounced [pɔˈdleːxnik]; German: Lichtenegg) is a settlement in the Haloze Hills in eastern Slovenia. It is the seat of the Municipality of Podlehnik. The area traditionally belonged to the region of Styria. It is now included in the Drava Statistical Region.

== Name ==
Podlehnik was attested in historical sources as Lihteneck and Leichtenekke in 1259–1260, as Lihtneck in 1297, and as Liehtneck in 1308, among other variants. The Slovene name is a fused prepositional phrase that has lost case inflection: pod 'under' + Lehnik, referring to the location of the village below Lehnik Castle. The name of the castle (German: Li(e)chtenegg) is a compound from Middle High German lieht 'light, bright' + egge 'hill, peak', thus meaning 'castle on a bright/sunny hill'. The Slovene change of the ending from -negg to -nik is an example of folk etymology based on analogy with many other toponyms ending in -nik.

== History ==
The settlement developed around 13th-century Lehnik Castle. The castle was destroyed during Ottoman raids in 1532 and very few traces of it remain (foundations of a tower and a defense ditch). What was originally the castle chapel is now the local church, dedicated to the Virgin Mary, and was expanded in the 16th and 18th centuries.
