= Jelovice, Slovenia =

Jelovice Sveti Bolfenk v Halozah (until 1955)
- Location in Slovenia
- Coordinates: 46°18′43.41″N 15°45′10.13″E
- Country: Slovenia
- Traditional region: Styria
- Statistical region: Drava
- Municipality: Majšperk

Area
  - Total: 5.48 km^{2} (2.12 sq mi)
- Elevation: 490 m (1,610 ft)

Population (2002)
  - Total: 68

Jelovice (pronounced [ˈjeːlɔʋitsɛ]) is a settlement in the western Haloze Hills in the Municipality of Majšperk in northeastern Slovenia. The area is part of the traditional region of Styria. It is now included with the rest of the municipality in the Drava Statistical Region.

== Name ==
The name of the settlement was changed from Sveti Bolfenk v Halozah (literally, 'Saint Wolfgang in Haloze') to Jelovice in 1955. The name was changed on the basis of the 1948 Law on Names of Settlements and Designations of Squares, Streets, and Buildings as part of efforts by Slovenia's postwar communist government to remove religious elements from toponyms.

== Church ==
The local church is dedicated to Saint Wolfgang (Slovene: sveti Bolfenk) and belongs to the Parish of Majšperk. It dates to the 14th century.
