= Gorca =

- Location in Slovenia
- Coordinates: 46°20′6.41″N 15°51′49.69″E
- Country: Slovenia
- Traditional region: Styria
- Statistical region: Drava
- Municipality: Podlehnik

Area
  - Total: 6.11 km^{2} (2.36 sq mi)
- Elevation: 286.9 m (941 ft)

Population (2002)
  - Total: 148

Gorca (pronounced [ˈɡoːɾtsa]) is a settlement in the Haloze Hills above the left bank of the Dravinja River in the Municipality of Podlehnik in eastern Slovenia. The area is part of the traditional region of Styria. It is now included in the Drava Statistical Region.

The parish church in the settlement is dedicated to the Holy Trinity and belongs to the Roman Catholic Archdiocese of Maribor. The parish is known as Sveta Trojica–Podlehnik. The church was built in 1654.
