= Nemška Vas, Ribnica =

Village in Slovenia

Nemška Vas
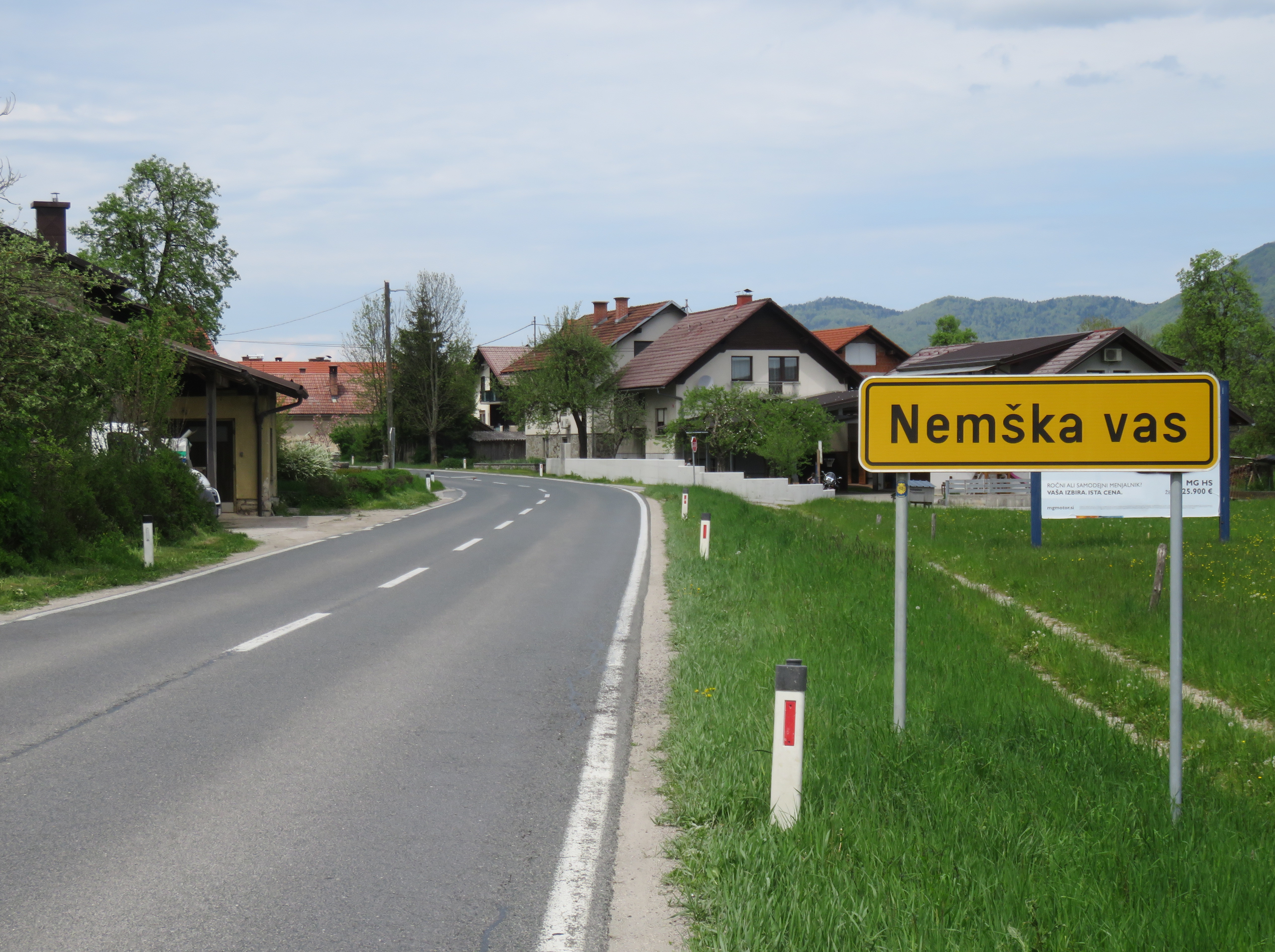

- Location in Slovenia
- Coordinates: 45°43′13.5″N 14°44′38.72″E
- Country: Slovenia
- Traditional region: Lower Carniola
- Statistical region: Southeast Slovenia
- Municipality: Ribnica

Area
  - Total: 2.71 km^{2} (1.05 sq mi)
- Elevation: 487.4 m (1,599 ft)

Population (2002)
  - Total: 268
- Postal code: 1310

Nemška Vas (pronounced [ˈneːmʃka ˈʋaːs]; Slovene: Nemška vas, German: Deutschdorf) is a village in the Municipality of Ribnica in southern Slovenia. It lies south of the town of Ribnica on the main road to Dolenja Vas. The area is part of the traditional region of Lower Carniola and is now included in the Southeast Slovenia Statistical Region.

== Name ==
Both the Slovene and German names of the village mean 'German village', referring to a settlement of ethnic Germans in what was otherwise Slovene ethnic territory.

== Church ==
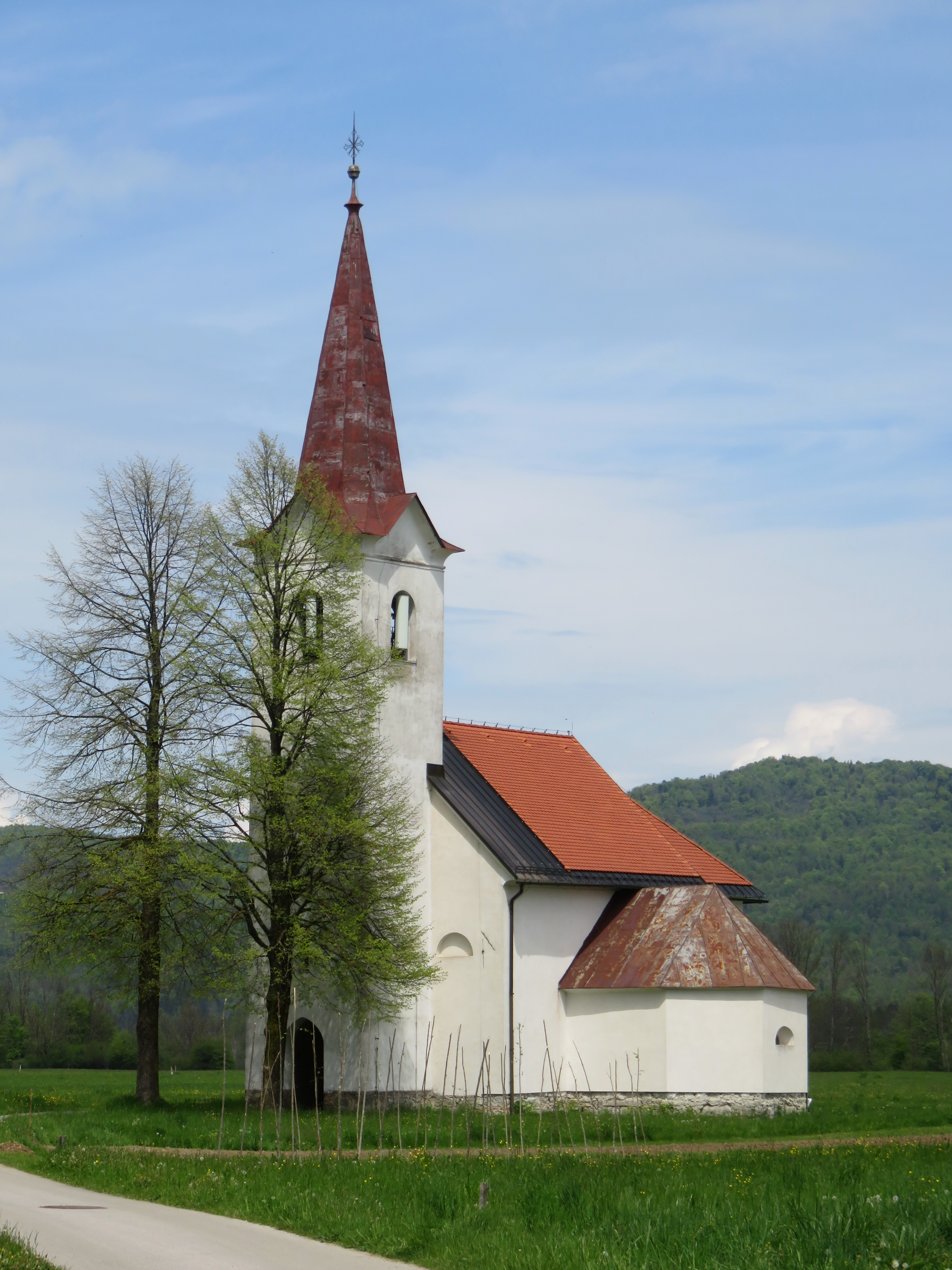
Saint Leonard's Church

The local church, built east of the village, is dedicated to Saint Leonard and belongs to the Parish of Ribnica. It was built in 1843 on the site of a 14th-century church.
