= Ptujska Gora =

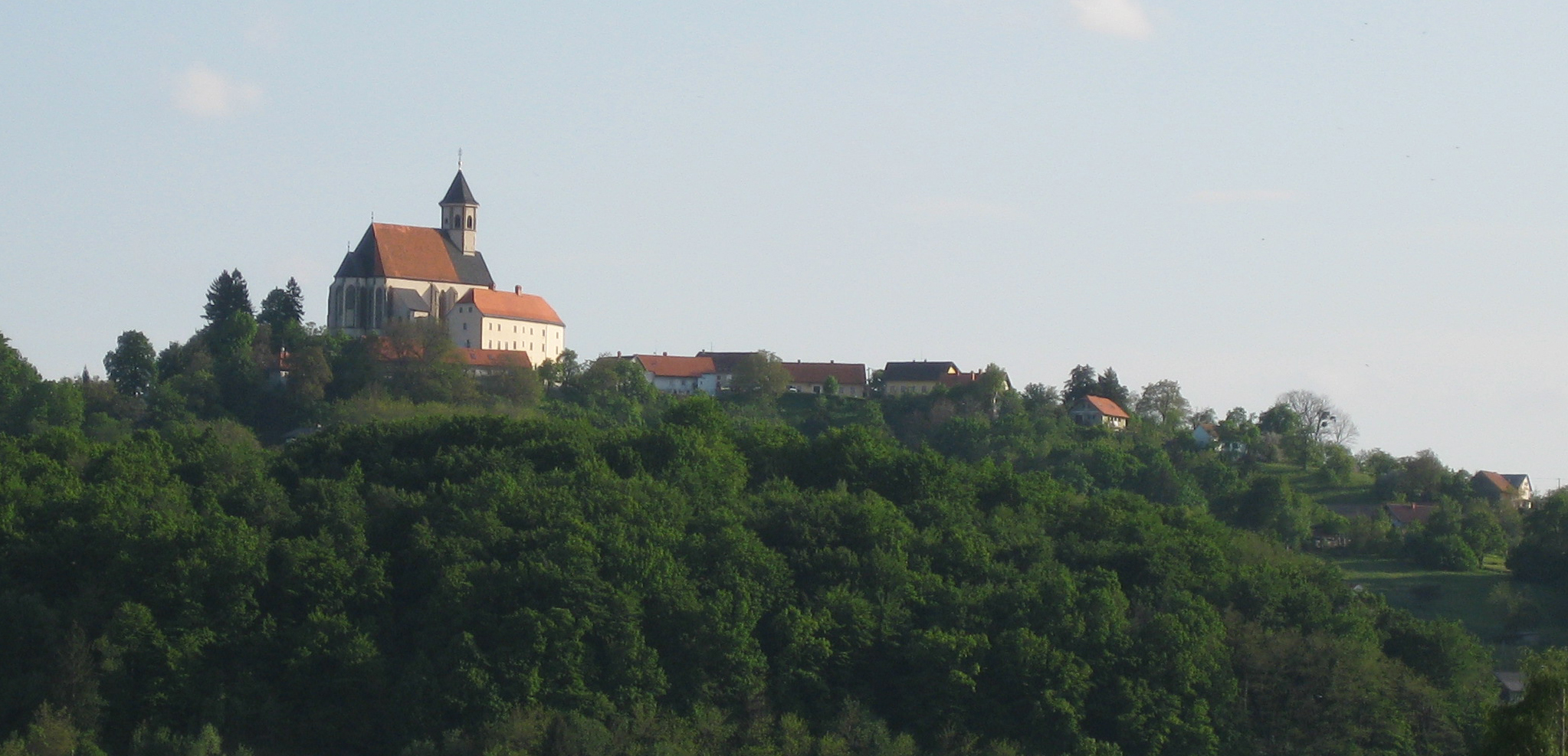

- Location in Slovenia
- Coordinates: 46°21′12.53″N 15°45′39.79″E
- Country: Slovenia
- Traditional region: Styria
- Statistical region: Drava
- Municipality: Majšperk

Area
  - Total: 1.78 km^{2} (0.69 sq mi)
- Elevation: 320.6 m (1,052 ft)

Population (2020)
  - Total: 509

Ptujska Gora (pronounced [ˈptuːi̯ska ˈɡɔːɾa]; German: Maria Neustift) is a village in the Municipality of Majšperk in northeastern Slovenia. The area is part of the traditional region of Styria. It is now included with the rest of the municipality in the Drava Statistical Region.

== Religious heritage ==
It is best known for its Basilica Minor, and also for a late-14th-century statue of the Virgin of Mercy. It depicts Mary with a long coat protecting a crowd underneath it. The parish church is built on top of a hill and is a dominant landmark of the area. The church itself is known as the Basilica of the Virgin of Mercy (Slovene: Bazilika Marije Zavetnice s plaščem) and is one of the best-known pilgrimage churches in Slovenia. It belongs to the Roman Catholic Archdiocese of Maribor. Nearby are also a second church dating to the 16th century and dedicated to Saint Leonard and a 19th-century chapel dedicated to Saint Roch. Along the road toward Stogovci there is a stone pillar dating from 1696 known as the Gigler shrine (Giglerjevo znamenje).

== Description ==
Ptujska Gora is a clustered village on the top of the ridge of the Dravinja Hilla, between the Dravinja River to the south and the Polskava River to the north. The settlement developed when a new church dedicated to the virgin Mary was built at the end of the 14th century. The settlement gained the right to an annual fair in 1447 and began to develop into a market, first mentioned in 1578.

Ptujska Gora is a known place of pilgrimage. It was once called Nova Štifta, then Mons gratiarum 'Grace Mountain'. During the Turkish invasions, due to a miracle (Mary wrapped the hill in a black cloud so that the attackers did not notice it), the name Montenegro became established among the locals. For some time, the name Maria Neustift bei Pettau was used. In 1937, after the arrival of the Minorites, the current name of the settlement came into use.

In July 2004, the Ptujska Gora Tourist Association opened an information office on the square in Ptujska Gora, where tourists can receive information about the place, the church and other sights, cycling routes, accommodation and catering in the immediate and wider environment. They also sell souvenirs, postcards, tourist guides, bicycle tickets, event tickets, and other things intended for tourists. In 2013, the tourist association took over the management of contract post office, where residents and tourists can perform all postal and banking services.

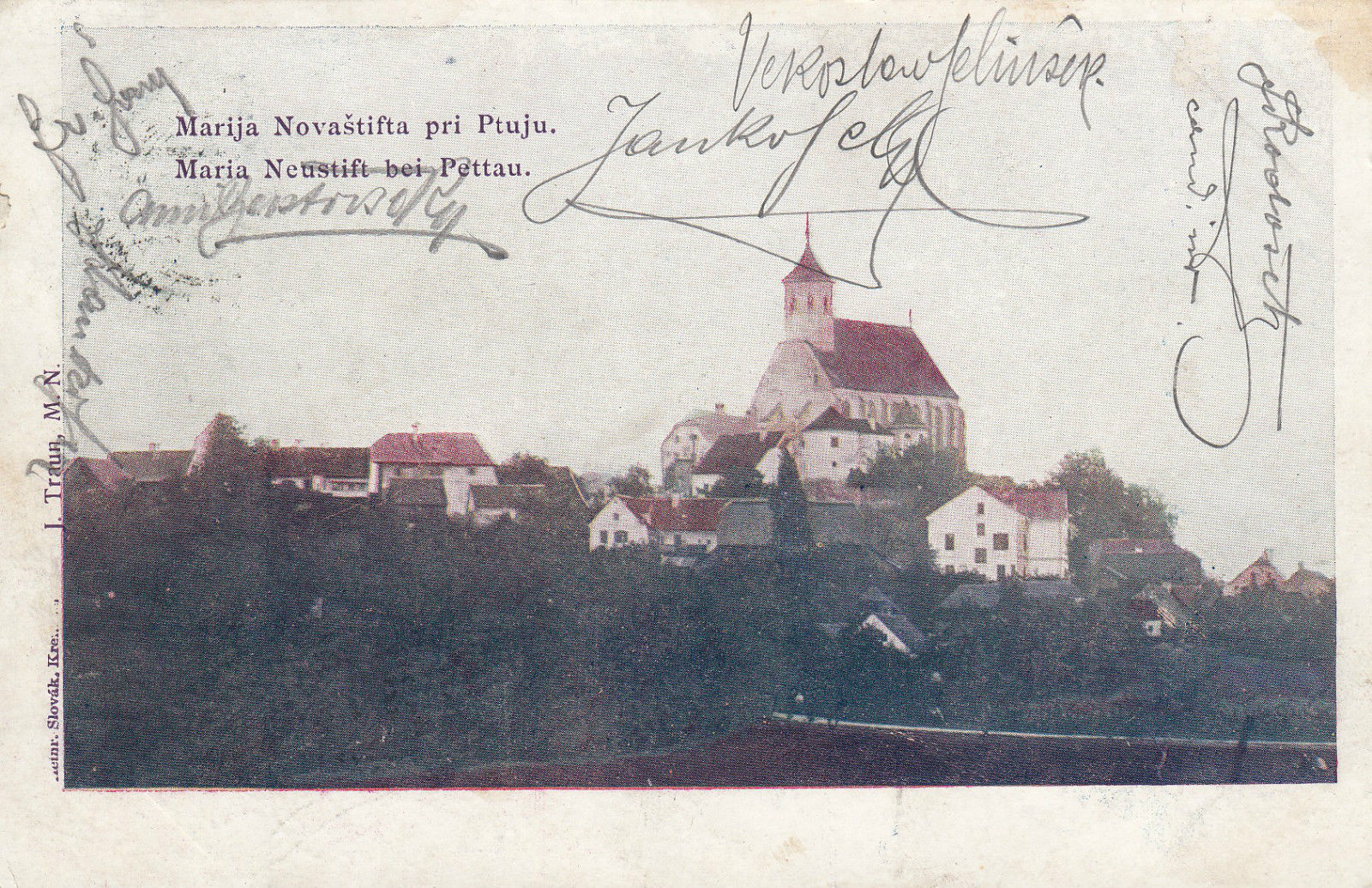
Postcard of Ptujska Gora in 1909

The village is located along the local road from Ptuj to Majšperk. It is 13 kilometers from Ptuj.
