= Pannonian dialect group =

Group of dialects of Slovene

Map of regional groups of Slovene dialects Pannonian

The Pannonian dialect group (panonska narečna skupina), or northeastern dialect group, is a group of closely related dialects of Slovene. The Pannonian dialects are spoken in northeastern Slovenia (Prekmurje, in the eastern areas of Slovenian Styria), and among the Hungarian Slovenes.

== Phonological and morphological characteristics ==
Among other features, this group is characterized by loss of pitch accent, non-lengthened short syllables, and a new acute on short syllables.

== Individual dialects and subdialects ==
- Prekmurje dialect (prekmursko narečje, prekmurščina). (Note: According to some researchers, the Prekmurje dialect is a regional literary language because it has a standardized grammar, a long history of separated development and a large number of written sources. However, this view is disputed.)
- Slovene Hills dialect (goričansko narečje, goričanščina)
- Prlekija dialect (prleško narečje, prleščina)
- Haloze dialect (haloško narečje, haloščina)
