= Naklo, Črnomelj =

Naklo
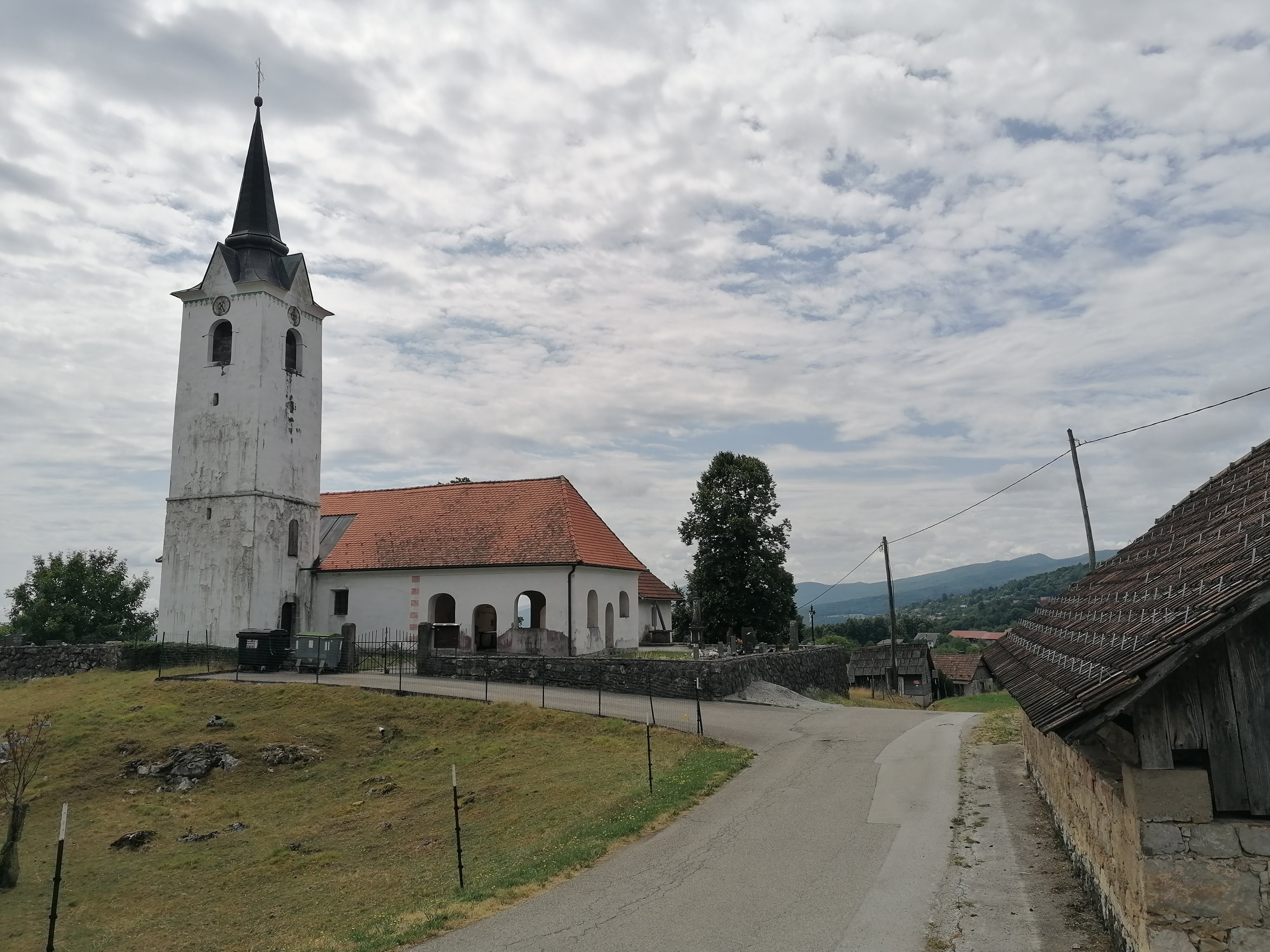

- Location in Slovenia
- Coordinates: 45°35′37.75″N 15°8′43.18″E
- Country: Slovenia
- Traditional region: White Carniola
- Statistical region: Southeast Slovenia
- Municipality: Črnomelj

Area
  - Total: 1.06 km^{2} (0.41 sq mi)
- Elevation: 319.8 m (1,049 ft)

Population (2020)
  - Total: 44
  - Density: 42/km^{2} (110/sq mi)
- Postal code: 8340

Naklo (pronounced [ˈnaːklɔ]) is a settlement northwest of the town of Črnomelj in the White Carniola area of southeastern Slovenia. The area is part of the traditional region of Lower Carniola and is now included in the Southeast Slovenia Statistical Region.

== Name ==
The name Naklo appears elsewhere in Slovenia and in other Slavic countries—for example, Nakło (Poland) and Náklo (Czech Republic). The name is derived from *nakъlo, a fused form that has lost inflection from the prepositional phrase *na kъlě 'on a (sandy) spit in a river', also commonly referring to a swampy or damp area, thus referring to the location of the settlement.

== Church ==
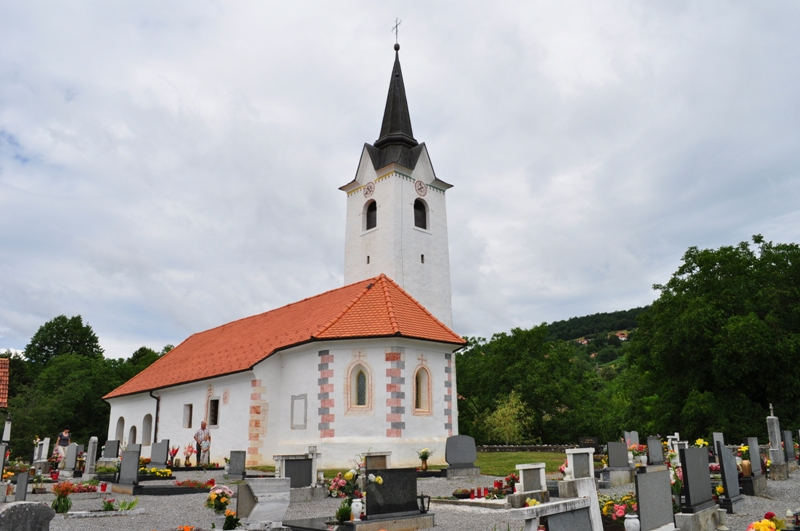
Exterior

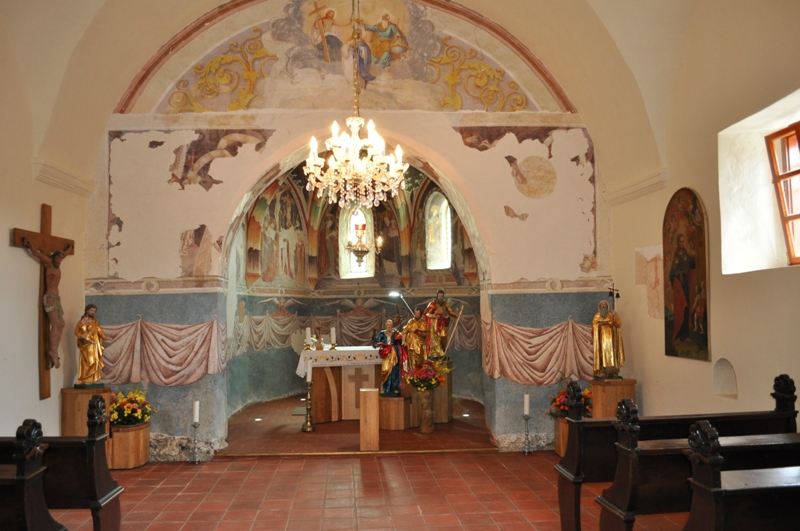
Chancel

Saint James' Church

The local church is dedicated to Saint James and belongs to the Parish of Črnomelj. It is a single-naved medieval building with a Gothic sanctuary covered in wall paintings dating to 1470 depicting scenes from the Passion of Christ.
