= Nova Vas, Ivančna Gorica =

Village in the Municipality of Ivančna Gorica, Slovenia

Nova Vas
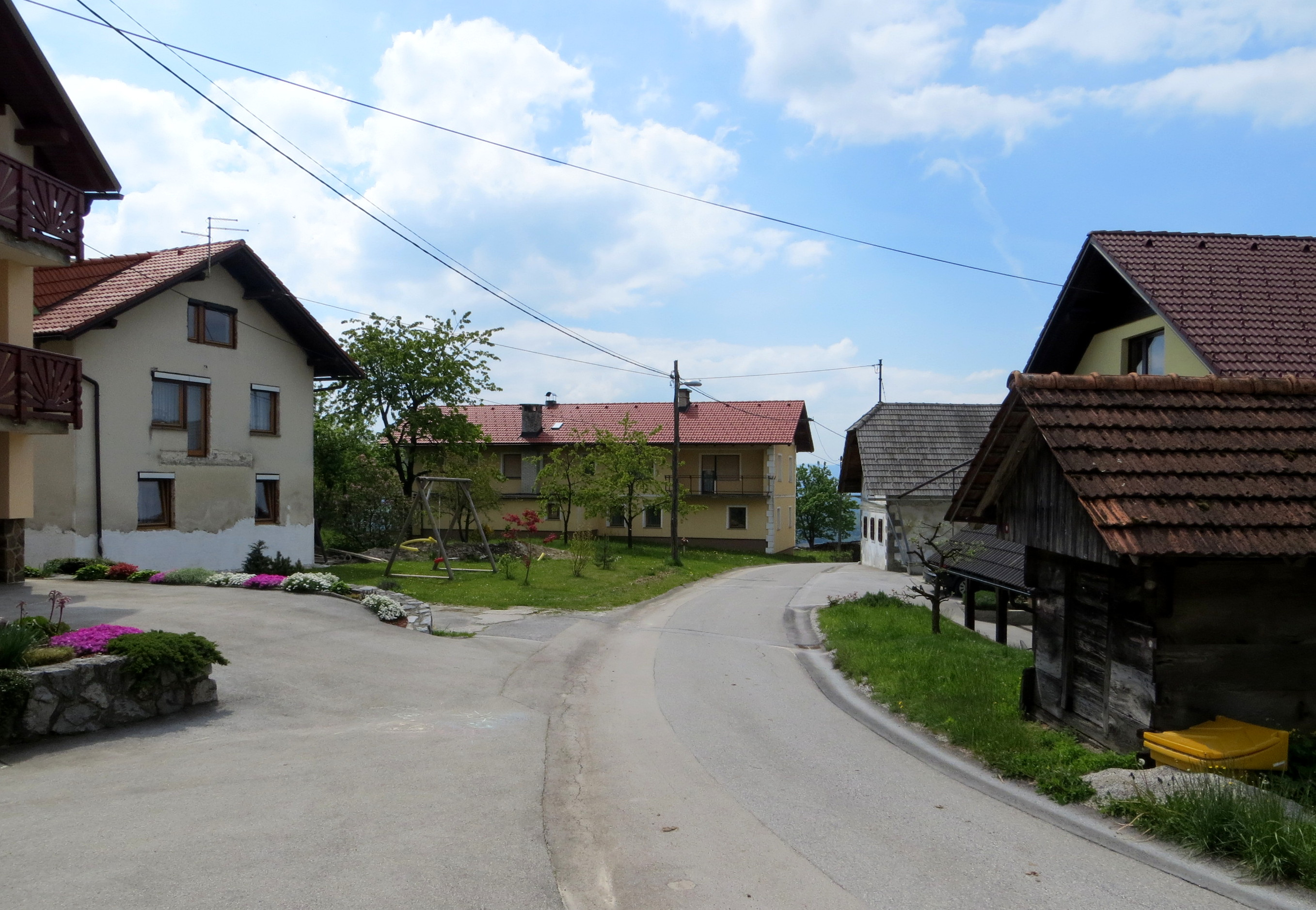

- Location in Slovenia
- Coordinates: 45°55′33.69″N 14°44′41.38″E
- Country: Slovenia
- Traditional region: Lower Carniola
- Statistical region: Central Slovenia
- Municipality: Ivančna Gorica

Area
  - Total: 1.56 km^{2} (0.60 sq mi)
- Elevation: 573.2 m (1,881 ft)

Population (2002)
  - Total: 58

Nova Vas (pronounced [ˈnɔːʋa ˈʋaːs]; Slovene: Nova vas, German: Neudorf) is a village in the hills south of Višnja Gora in the Municipality of Ivančna Gorica in central Slovenia. The area is part of the historical region of Lower Carniola. The municipality is now included in the Central Slovenia Statistical Region.

== Church ==
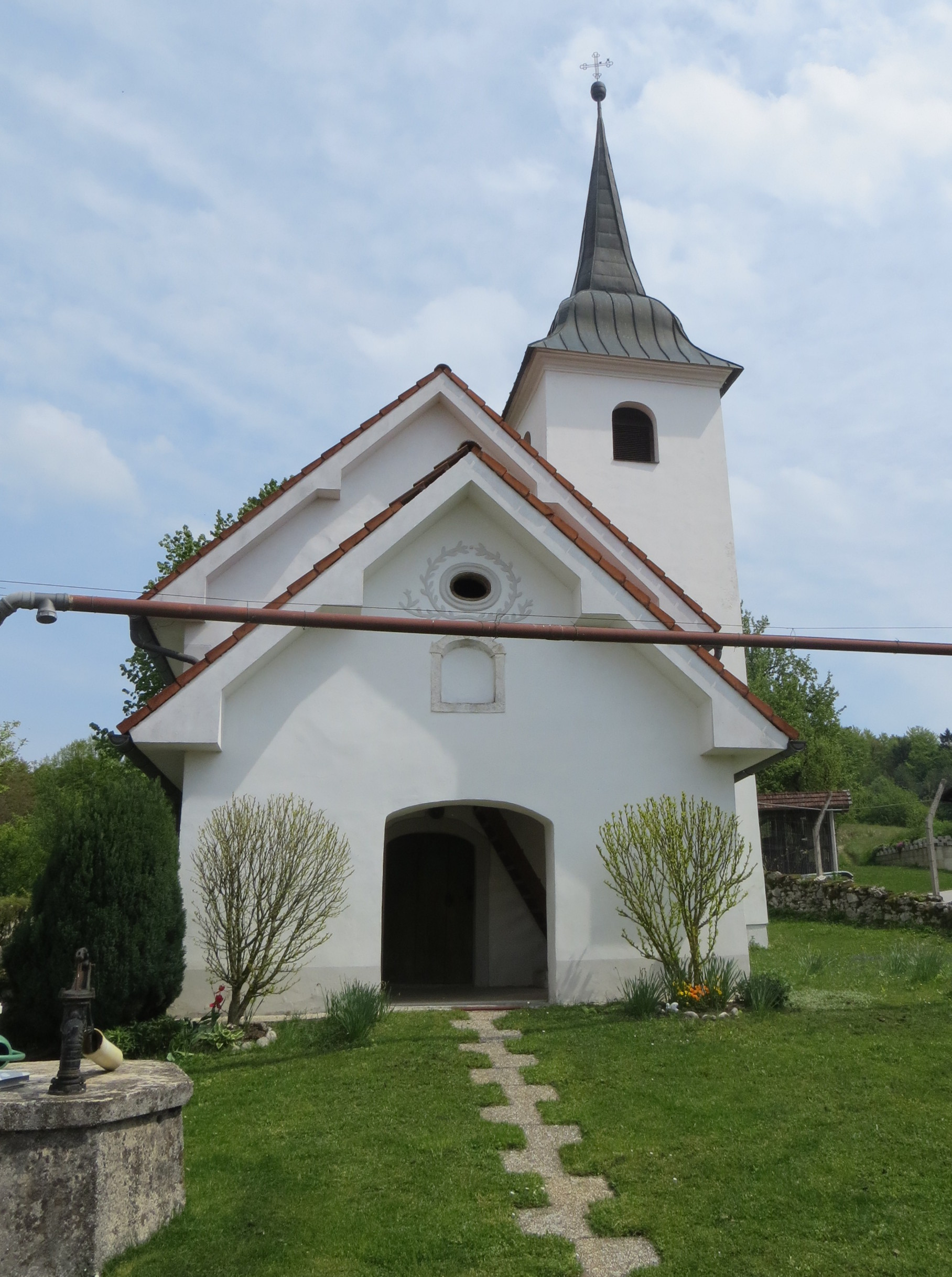
Saint Leonard's Church

The local church is dedicated to Saint Leonard (Slovene: sveti Lenart) and belongs to the Parish of Višnja Gora. It dates to the 14th century.
