= Nadole, Žetale =

Nadole
- Location in Slovenia
- Coordinates: 46°17′10.29″N 15°45′34.08″E
- Country: Slovenia
- Traditional region: Styria
- Statistical region: Drava
- Municipality: Žetale

Area
  - Total: 4.31 km^{2} (1.66 sq mi)
- Elevation: 361 m (1,184 ft)

Population (2002)
  - Total: 152

Nadole (pronounced [ˈnaːdɔlɛ]) is a settlement in the Municipality of Žetale in eastern Slovenia. It lies in the Haloze Hills and is made up of a number of smaller dispersed hamlets: Jesenice, Kofirt, Ložec, Marija Vas (Slovene: Marija vas), Menik, Nadola, Pušjek, Rodni Dol, Sep, Strmec, Topole, Tomanje, Višnjavec, Zagaj, Zalopata, and Zlaka. The area is part of the traditional region of Styria. It is now included in the Drava Statistical Region.
