= Nova Gora, Litija =

Nova Gora
- Location in Slovenia
- Coordinates: 46°0′30.39″N 14°56′35.91″E
- Country: Slovenia
- Traditional region: Lower Carniola
- Statistical region: Central Sava
- Municipality: Litija

Area
  - Total: 4.3 km^{2} (1.7 sq mi)
- Elevation: 561.6 m (1,843 ft)

Population (2002)
  - Total: 71
- Postal code: 1274

Nova Gora (pronounced [ˈnɔːʋa ˈɡɔːɾa]; German: Neuberg) is a small settlement in the hills west of Gabrovka in the Municipality of Litija in central Slovenia. The area is part of the traditional region of Lower Carniola. It is now included with the rest of the municipality in the Central Sava Statistical Region.

East of the village is a monument to 54 Partisans killed nearby in the Second World War. It was erected in 1959.
