= Sestrže =

- Location in Slovenia
- Coordinates: 46°21′26.47″N 15°41′23.62″E
- Country: Slovenia
- Traditional region: Styria
- Statistical region: Drava
- Municipality: Majšperk

Area
  - Total: 5.71 km^{2} (2.20 sq mi)
- Elevation: 255 m (837 ft)

Population (2020)
  - Total: 309

Sestrže (pronounced [ˈseːstəɾʒɛ]) is a village in the Municipality of Majšperk in northeastern Slovenia. The area is part of the traditional region of Styria and is now included with the rest of the municipality in the Drava Statistical Region.

== Lake Sestrže ==
Lake Sestrže, or the Medvedce Reservoir, is a water reservoir for retaining the high waters of the Polskava River. It is a special conservation area, a Natura 2000 site, and a natural value of national importance. The lake has an area of 150 hectares (370 acres) and a depth of 1–4 meters (3 ft 3 in – 13 ft 1 in).

It is an ecologically important area, performs the function of a fish farm, and together with the surrounding floodplain forests has the status of an internationally important area for birds.

Ten species of amphibians, 49 species of dragonflies, more than 200 species of birds, and many rare wetland and aquatic plants live here. Over 7,000 birds live here over a period of time.
