= Breg, Majšperk =

Breg
- Location in Slovenia
- Coordinates: 46°20′7.87″N 15°44′17.01″E
- Country: Slovenia
- Traditional region: Styria
- Statistical region: Drava
- Municipality: Majšperk

Area
  - Total: 1.07 km^{2} (0.41 sq mi)
- Elevation: 239.8 m (787 ft)

Population (2002)
  - Total: 305

Breg (pronounced [ˈbɾeːk]) is a settlement on the right bank of the Dravinja River in the Municipality of Majšperk in northeastern Slovenia. The area is part of the traditional region of Styria. It is now included with the rest of the municipality in the Drava Statistical Region.

== History ==
The place has a very rich history, as the Wool Products Factory and Konus Planika operated there. The place also had its own power plant in the past, owned by Marija Kubricht.

== Cultural heritage ==
A Baroque mansion in the settlement, known as Hamre Castle (Slovene: Grad Hamre), was built in 1735.
