= Žetale =

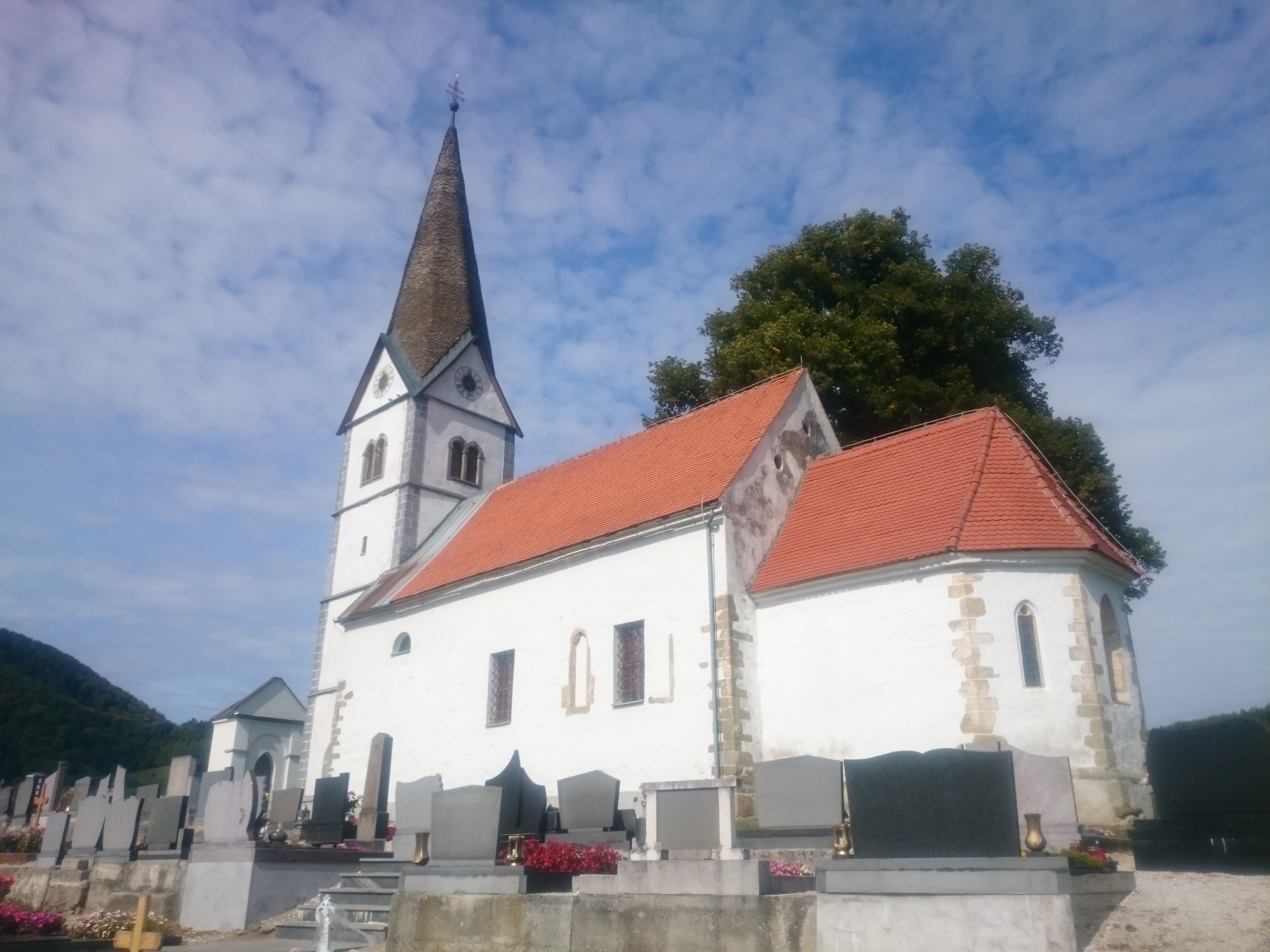

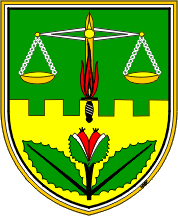
- Coat of arms

- Location in Slovenia
- Coordinates: 46°16′34.72″N 15°47′48.12″E
- Country: Slovenia
- Traditional region: Styria
- Statistical region: Drava
- Municipality: Žetale

Area
  - Total: 12.66 km^{2} (4.89 sq mi)
- Elevation: 291 m (955 ft)

Population (2018)
  - Total: 356

Žetale (pronounced [ʒɛˈtaːlɛ]) is a village in eastern Slovenia, on the border with Croatia. It is the seat of the Municipality of Žetale. The area traditionally belonged to the region of Styria. It is now included in the Drava Statistical Region.

== History ==
Žetale was first mentioned in written documents dating to 1228, and old parish documents record its name as Schiltarin. The area was subject to repeated Ottoman invasion, and there are pseudoetymological claims that the village is named after a supposed defender of the village named Žetal. In fact, the name is derived from Middle High German Schiltern. As of 2018, the village of Žetale had a population of 356.

== Festivals ==
A chestnut festival in October is a locally well known. There is an annual pilgrimage called Jarmek held on 15 August, the feast day of the Assumption of Mary and a public holiday in Slovenia, where pilgrims walk to Mary Help of Christians Church (Slovene: Marija pomočnica), known locally as Marijatrošt.

== Notable people ==
Notable people that were born or lived in Žetale include:

- Anton Hajšek (1827–1907): patriot and publisher of the writings of Anton Martin Slomšek
- Jože Topolovec (1934–2010): writer (pseudonym Jože Haložan)
