= Majšperk =

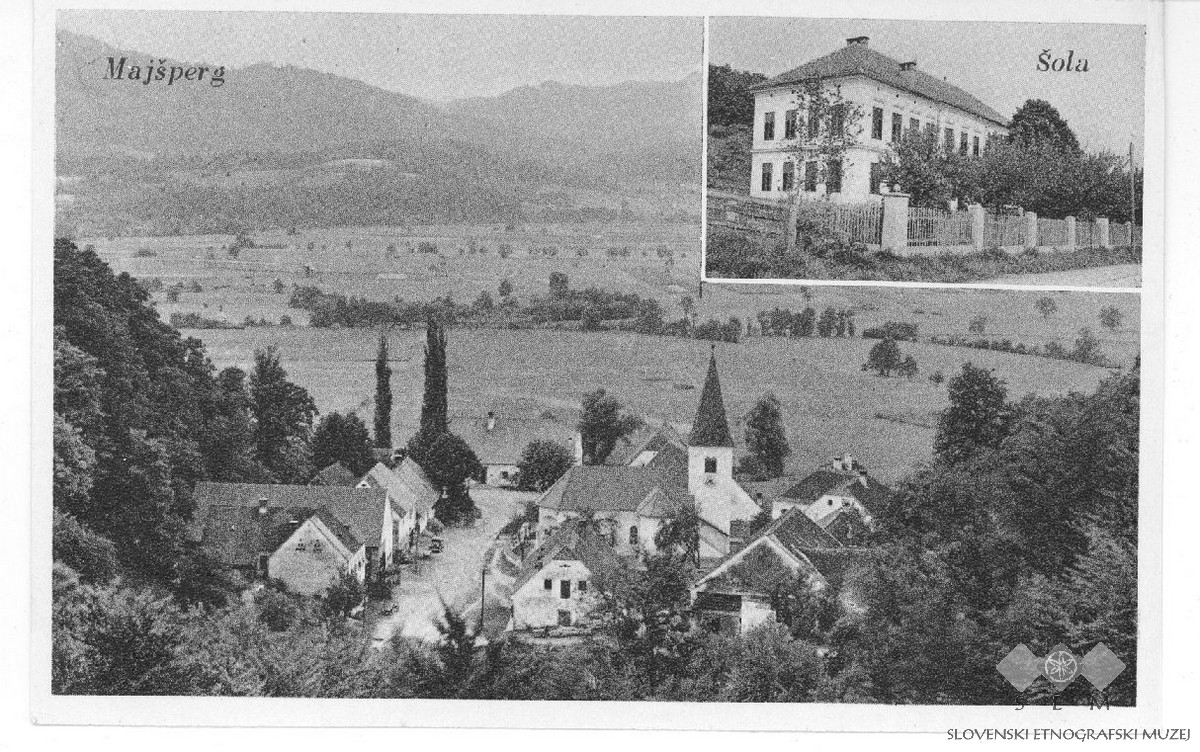

- Flag Coat of arms

- Location of Majšperk in Slovenia
- Coordinates: 46°21′N 15°44′E
- Country: Slovenia
- Traditional region: Styria
- Statistical region: Drava
- Municipality: Majšperk
- Elevation: 249.1 m (817 ft)

Population (2020)
  - Total: 606
- Time zone: UTC+01 (CET)
  - Summer (DST): UTC+02 (CEST)

Majšperk (pronounced [ˈmaːi̯ʃpɛɾk], in older sources Majšperg, German: Monsberg) is a settlement in the Municipality of Majšperk in northeastern Slovenia. It is the seat of the municipality. The area is part of the traditional region of Styria. The municipality is now included in the Drava Statistical Region.

== Name ==
Majšperk was first mentioned as Mannesperch in written documents dating to 1261 (and as Mansperch in 1263 and 1371, and Monsperg in 1426). The name is derived from 13th-century Majšperk Castle (German: Monsberg). The castle fell into disrepair in the late 19th century and today only ruins remain. The castle name is a compound of the genitive form of the Old High German name Manne plus berg 'mountain', originally meaning 'Manno's mountain'.

== History ==
Majšperk is an old settlement at the foot of the Dravinja Hills (Slovene: Dravinjske gorice), at the intersection of the roads to Poljčane, Ptuj, Rogatec, and Slovenska Bistrica. It was first mentioned in old documents in 1261 together with Majšperk Castle and Saint Nicholas's Church. The castle was rebuilt after a fire in 1695, but it fell into disrepair at the end of the 19th century. In the urbanized part of the settlement stands Hamre Castle, a small structure that was owned by the Ptuj Minorites from 1461 to 1880.

== Church ==
The parish church in the settlement is dedicated to Saint Nicholas and belongs to the Roman Catholic Archdiocese of Maribor. It dates to the 13th century, but the current church was built in 1639.
