= Haloze =

Coordinates: 46°22′10.83″N 15°56′8.41″E

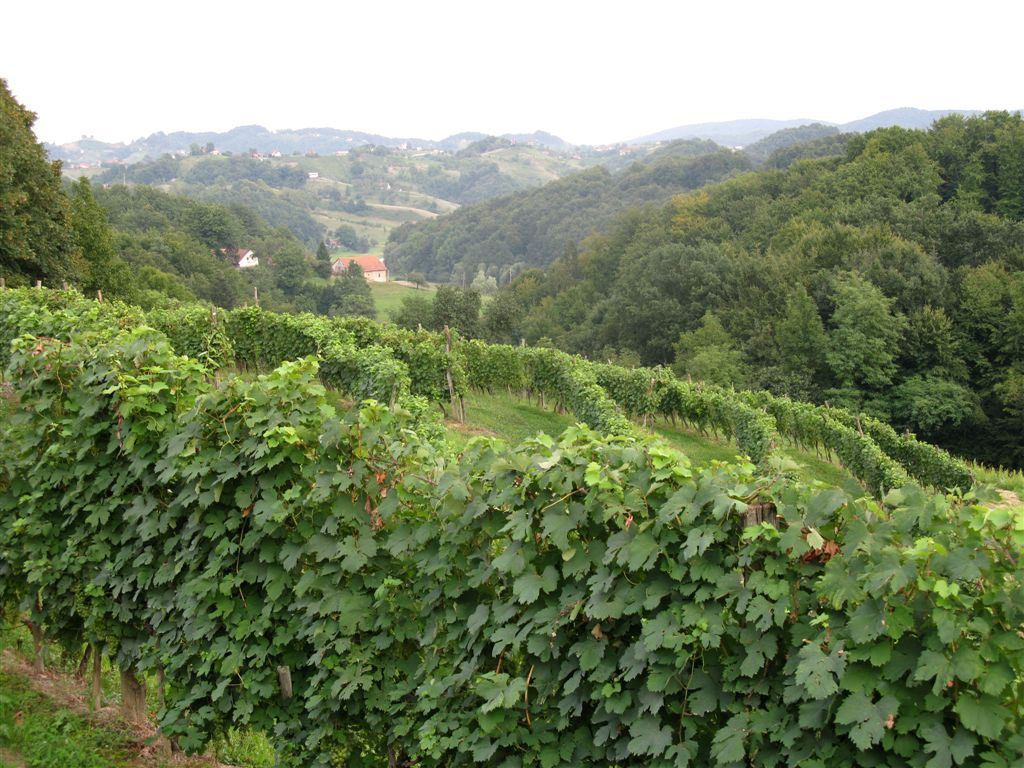
A typical Haloze scene with vineyards and wooded hills in Mali Okič

Haloze (pronounced [ˈxaːlɔzɛ]) is a geographical sub-region of Slovenia. It is in the northeast of the country, in the Styria region.

== General characteristics ==
Haloze is a hilly area, running roughly east–west bounded by the border with Croatia to the south and the Dravinja and Drava rivers to the north. In total, it comprises approximately 300 km^{2} (120 sq mi), where around 21,000 people live in seven municipalities (Cirkulane, Gorišnica, Majšperk, Podlehnik, Videm, Zavrč, and Žetale). From its western end near Makole, it runs in a relatively narrow southwest–northeast belt as far as Zavrč, about 40 km (25 mi) in length as the crow flies. Its western part is wooded with thick beech and pine forests, while its eastern part has been a noted viticultural area since Roman times.

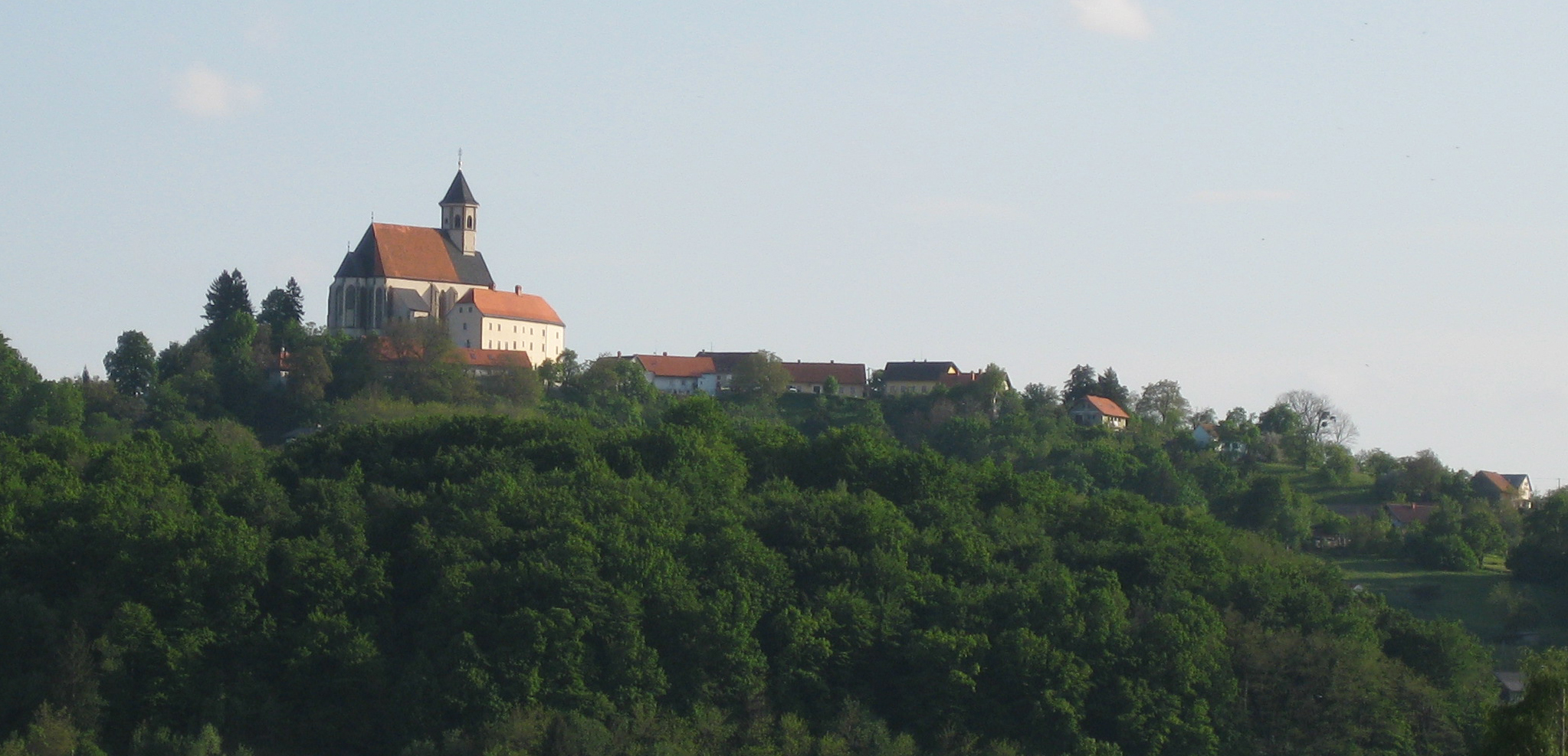
Ptujska Gora (Mount Ptuj), 342 metres (1,122 ft), one of the hills at the western end of Haloze

== Geology ==
While Haloze has a similar climate to the rest of the Drava Valley, it is rather different geologically. Its soils are generally mid-Tertiary sandstone based on dolomite rock. Lying in the southern part of the Drava Valley, the Haloze Hills rose before the drying-out of the Pannonian Sea entered its final phase in the middle of Pleistocene epoch, about 600,000 years ago. The water ruptured its way through the modern Đerdap Gorge on the Danube River and flowed rapidly away, causing the strong erosion of poorly consolidated sandstone and thus steep hillsides. Haloze's highest point is in Jelovice, at 623 metres (2,044 ft).

== Dialect ==
The Haloze dialect is one of the Pannonian dialects of spoken Slovene. See Slovene dialects.

== Wine ==
Haloze is one of the seven districts of the Podravje wine region, with the others being Ljutomer–Ormož, Radgona–Kapela, Maribor, Prekmurje, the Central Slovene Hills, and Šmarje–Virštanj.

Viticulture in Haloze was started by the Celts as early as the 4th century BC, and spread with the arrival of the Romans. Christianity also continued the tradition as wine played an important role in their ceremonies. The Slavic tribes who later settled in Haloze took on the cultivation of vines from their predecessors.

Vineyards here mostly line the upper hillsides, as the lower slopes are often kept in excessive shade. The traditional tilling of horizontal lines of vines included the backbreaking task of carrying soil from the lowest row to the top. As the rows were tilled from the top down, the soil tended to slide downslope, and to upkeep the vineyards properly, the soil collected at the bottom had to be returned to the top. With vertically planted vineyards on less steep slopes, this work is no longer as necessary as it once was, but on most sites grass is allowed to grow between the rows to minimize erosion.

White wines dominate the area. Laski Rizling is the most frequently planted grape, which is mainly used to produce medium dry, slightly syrupy, wine. However, dry Laski Rizling is also produced. Other popular white wines include Traminec, Beli Pinot, Sauvignon, and Renski Rizling. The only red produced in significant quantities is Modri Pinot. Haložan is a blend of locally produced Laski Rizling, Sauvignon, Beli Pinot, and Sipon that ages quite well. It is often mixed with sparkling water to make spritzer.

Most of the wines grown in Haloze are produced, stored, and bottled in Ptuj in the neighbouring Central Slovene Hills area.

== Monuments ==
Borl Castle, first mentioned in writing in 1199, is on a high rocky ledge overlooking an ancient crossing point on the Drava River. During the Second World War the castle was used by the occupying Germans as an internment camp, and after the war it was converted into a hotel, but then lay empty and abandoned. Recently the state has taken over the care of it and has undertaken its architectural restoration.

== See also ==
- Hrvatsko Zagorje

== Bibliography ==
=== Meteorology ===
- Počakal, Damir (2005-12-15). "Influence of Orography on Hail Characteristics in the Continental Part of Croatia". Hrvatski meteorološki časopis (40): 641–642. ISSN 1330-0083.
