= List of cities, towns, and villages in Slovenia: Š =

This is a list of cities, towns, and villages in Slovenia, starting with Š.

Settlement	Municipality
Šafarsko	Razkrižje
Šahovec	Trebnje
Šalamenci	Puconci
Šalara	Koper
Šalinci	Ljutomer
Šalka vas	Kočevje
Šalovci	Ormož
Šalovci	Šalovci
Šardinje	Ormož
Šared	Izola
Šavna Peč	Hrastnik
Ščit	Litija
Ščurki	Velike Lašče
Ščurkovo	Cerknica
Šebrelje	Cerkno
Šedem	Krško
Šedina	Šentjur
Šegova vas	Loški Potok
Šeki	Koper
Šembije	Ilirska Bistrica
Šemnik	Zagorje ob Savi
Šempas	Nova Gorica
Šempeter pri Gorici	Šempeter-Vrtojba
Šempeter v Savinjski dolini	Žalec
Šenbric	Velenje
Šenčur	Šenčur
Šentanel	Prevalje
Šentgotard	Zagorje ob Savi
Šentilj pod Turjakom	Mislinja
Šentilj v Slovenskih Goricah	Šentilj
Šentjakob	Šentjernej
Šentjanž nad Dravčami	Vuzenica
Šentjanž nad Štorami	Štore
Šentjanž pri Dravogradu	Dravograd
Šentjanž	Mozirje
Šentjanž	Sevnica
Šentjernej	Šentjernej
Šentjošt nad Horjulom	Dobrova-Polhov Gradec
Šentjošt	Novo mesto
Šentjungert	Celje
Šentjur na Polju	Sevnica
Šentjur	Šentjur
Šentjurij na Dolenjskem	Mirna Peč
Šentjurje	Ivančna Gorica
Šentlambert	Zagorje ob Savi
Šentlovrenc	Trebnje
Šentovec	Slovenska Bistrica
Šentožbolt	Lukovica
Šentpavel na Dolenjskem	Ivančna Gorica
Šentpavel pri Domžalah	Domžale
Šentpavel	Ljubljana
Šentrupert	Braslovče
Šentrupert	Laško
Šentrupert	Trebnje
Šenturška Gora	Cerklje na Gorenjskem
Šentvid pri Grobelnem	Šmarje pri Jelšah
Šentvid pri Lukovici	Lukovica
Šentvid pri Planini	Šentjur
Šentvid pri Stični	Ivančna Gorica
Šentvid pri Zavodnju	Šoštanj
Šentviška Gora	Tolmin
Šepulje	Sežana
Šerovo	Šmarje pri Jelšah
Šešče pri Preboldu	Prebold
Šetarova	Lenart
Ševlje	Škofja Loka
Ševnica	Mirna
Šibelji	Komen
Šibenik	Šentjur
Šikole	Kidričevo
Šinkov Turn	Vodice
Šipek	Črnomelj
Širje	Laško
Širmanski Hrib	Litija
Široka Set	Litija
Škalce	Slovenske Konjice
Škale	Velenje
Škalske Cirkovce	Velenje
Škamevec	Velike Lašče
Škarnice	Dobje
Škedenj	Slovenske Konjice
Škemljevec	Metlika
Šklendrovec	Zagorje ob Savi
Šklendrovec	Zagorje ob Savi
Škocjan	Divača
Škocjan	Domžale
Škocjan	Grosuplje
Škocjan	Koper
Škocjan	Škocjan
Škofce	Laško
Škofi	Komen
Škofija	Šmarje pri Jelšah
Škofja Loka	Škofja Loka
Škofja Riža	Trbovlje
Škofja vas	Celje
Škoflje	Divača
Škoflje	Ivančna Gorica
Škofljica	Škofljica
Škovec	Sevnica
Škovec	Trebnje
Škrabče	Bloke
Škrajnek	Ribnica
Škrbina	Komen
Škrilj	Kočevje
Škrilje	Ig
Škrilje	Metlika
Škrjanče pri Novem mestu	Novo mesto
Škrjanče	Ivančna Gorica
Škrjanče	Mirna
Škrjančevo	Domžale
Škrljevo	Trebnje
Škrlovica	Velike Lašče
Škufče	Bloke
Šlovrenc	Brda
Šmalčja vas	Šentjernej
Šmarata	Loška Dolina
Šmarca	Kamnik
Šmarčna	Sevnica
Šmarje pri Jelšah	Šmarje pri Jelšah
Šmarje pri Sežani	Sežana
Šmarje	Ajdovščina
Šmarje	Koper
Šmarje	Šentjernej
Šmarje-Sap	Grosuplje
Šmarješke Toplice	Novo mesto
Šmarjeta pri Celju	Celje
Šmarjeta	Novo mesto
Šmartinske Cirkovce	Velenje
Šmartno na Pohorju	Slovenska Bistrica
Šmartno ob Dreti	Nazarje
Šmartno ob Paki	Šmartno ob Paki
Šmartno pri Litiji	Litija
Šmartno pri Slovenj Gradcu	Slovenj Gradec
Šmartno v Rožni Dolini	Celje
Šmartno v Tuhinju	Kamnik
Šmartno	Brda
Šmartno	Cerklje na Gorenjskem
Šmatevž	Braslovče
Šmaver	Nova Gorica
Šmaver	Trebnje
Šmihel nad Mozirjem	Mozirje
Šmihel pod Nanosom	Postojna
Šmihel pri Žužemberku	Žužemberk
Šmihel	Laško
Šmihel	Nova Gorica
Šmihel	Pivka
Šmiklavž pri Škofji Vasi	Celje
Šmiklavž	Gornji Grad
Šmiklavž	Slovenj Gradec
Šmohor	Laško
Šober	Maribor
Šomat	Šentilj
Šoštanj	Šoštanj
Špeharji	Črnomelj
Špičnik	Kungota
Špitalič pri Slovenski Konjicah	Slovenske Konjice
Špitalič	Kamnik
Šprinc	Razkrižje
Šratovci	Radenci
Št. Janž pri Radljah	Radlje ob Dravi
Štajer	Kostel
Štajerska vas	Slovenske Konjice
Štajngrob	Sevnica
Štajngrova	Benedikt
Štalcerji	Kočevje
Štangarske Poljane	Litija
Štanjel	Komen
Štatenberg	Slovenska Bistrica
Štatenberk	Trebnje
Štefan pri Trebnjem	Trebnje
Štefanja Gora	Cerklje na Gorenjskem
Štjak	Sežana
Štore	Štore
Štorje	Sežana
Štorovo	Bloke
Štravberk	Novo mesto
Štrekljevec	Semič
Štrihovec	Šentilj
Štrit	Škocjan
Štrukljeva vas	Cerknica
Šturmovci	Videm
Šujica	Dobrova-Polhov Gradec
Šulinci	Gornji Petrovci
Šumnik	Litija
Šutna	Kranj
Šutna	Krško
