= List of cities, towns, and villages in Slovenia: C =

This is a list of cities, towns, and villages in Slovenia, starting with C.

Settlement	Municipality
Cajnarje	Cerknica
Cankova	Cankova
Cegelnica	Naklo
Ceglo	Brda
Celestrina	Maribor
Celine	Krško
Celje	Celje
Cenkova	Cerkvenjak
Centa	Velike Lašče
Cepki	Koper
Cerej	Koper
Cerina	Brežice
Cerkljanska Dobrava	Cerklje na Gorenjskem
Cerkljanski Vrh	Cerkno
Cerklje na Gorenjskem	Cerklje na Gorenjskem
Cerklje ob Krki	Brežice
Cerknica	Cerknica
Cerkno	Cerkno
Cerkvenjak	Cerkvenjak
Cerkvišče	Črnomelj
Cerov Log	Šentjernej
Cerovec pod Bočem	Rogaška Slatina
Cerovec pri Črešnjevcu	Semič
Cerovec pri Šmarju	Šmarje pri Jelšah
Cerovec pri Trebelnem	Trebnje
Cerovec Stanka Vraza	Ormož
Cerovec	Dolenjske Toplice
Cerovec	Sevnica
Cerovec	Šentjur
Cerovica	Litija
Cerovo	Grosuplje
Ceršak	Šentilj
Cesta	Ajdovščina
Cesta	Dobrepolje
Cesta	Krško
Cesta	Trebnje
Ceste	Rogaška Slatina
Cetore	Izola
Cezanjevci	Ljutomer
Cezlak	Slovenska Bistrica
Ciglence	Duplek
Cigonca	Slovenska Bistrica
Cikava	Grosuplje
Cikava	Trebnje
Ciringa	Kungota
Cirje	Krško
Cirknica	Šentilj
Cirkovce	Kidričevo
Cirkulane	Gorišnica
Cirkuše v Tuhinju	Kamnik
Cirkuše	Litija
Cirnik	Brežice
Cirnik	Mirna
Cmereška Gorca	Podčetrtek
Cogetinci	Cerkvenjak
Coklovca	Semič
Col	Ajdovščina
Coljava	Komen
Colnarji	Kostel
Crngrob	Škofja Loka
Cuber	Ljutomer
Cundrovec	Brežice
Cunkovci	Gorišnica
Curnovec	Brežice
Curnovec	Laško
Cven	Ljutomer
Cvetkovci	Ormož
Cvišlerji	Kočevje
