= Cerina =

Cerina may refer to:

== Places ==
- Cerina, Brežice, a settlement in Brežice, Slovenia
- Cerina, Croatia, a village in Bjelovar-Bilogora County, Croatia

== People with the given name ==
- Cerina Fairfax (1977–2026), American dentist and civic leader
- Cerina Vincent (born 1979), American actress and writer

== People with the surname ==
- Fabrizio Cerina, Italian investment banker
- Drago Marin Čerina (born 1949), Croatian Australian sculptor
- Igor Čerina (born 1988), Croatian footballer
- Marin Čerina (born 1995), Croatian sports shooter
- Vladimir Čerina (1891–1932), Croatian writer
