= Ženjak =

Ženjak Harigast (1941–1945)
- Location in Slovenia
- Coordinates: 46°35′52.02″N 15°52′39.61″E
- Country: Slovenia
- Traditional region: Styria
- Statistical region: Drava
- Municipality: Benedikt
- Elevation: 268.6 m (881 ft)

Population (2002)
  - Total: 54

Ženjak (pronounced [ˈʒeːnjak]) is a locality of the settlement Benedikt in the Municipality of Benedikt in northeastern Slovenia. Until 2003, it existed as an independent settlement. The area is part of the traditional region of Styria. The municipality is included in the Drava Statistical Region.

== History ==
In 1811, a hoard of 26 Early Iron Age bronze Negau helmets was discovered in the nearby woods. The village of Ženjak was of great interest to German archaeologists during the Nazi period and was briefly renamed Harigast during World War II. In 2003 it was merged into Benedikt.

== Notable people ==
Notable people that were born or lived in Ženjak:

- Ivan Kramberger (1936–1992), politician
