= Trstenik, Benedikt =

Trstenik
- Location in Slovenia
- Coordinates: 46°37′32.64″N 15°53′48.81″E
- Country: Slovenia
- Traditional region: Styria
- Statistical region: Drava
- Municipality: Benedikt

Area
  - Total: 1.37 km^{2} (0.53 sq mi)
- Elevation: 280.4 m (920 ft)

Population (2020)
  - Total: 107
  - Density: 78.1/km^{2} (202/sq mi)

Trstenik (pronounced [təɾstɛˈniːk]) is a settlement in the Municipality of Benedikt in the Slovene Hills (Slovene: Slovenske gorice) in northeastern Slovenia. The area is part of the traditional region of Styria. It is now included in the Drava Statistical Region.

There are two small chapel-shrines south of the main settlement. Both were built in the early 20th century.

Seven relatively intact tumuli from the Roman period have been identified near the settlement. Such burials are fairly common in the area with an extensive burial ground near Trotkova south of Trstenik.
