= Kramberger =

Kramberger is a Slovenian surname that may refer to:

- Franc Kramberger (born 1936), Slovenian Roman Catholic prelate
- Ivan Kramberger (1936–1992), Slovenian inventor, writer, philanthropist and politician
- Nataša Kramberger (born 1983), Slovenian writer and journalist
- Taja Kramberger (born 1970), Slovenian poet, translator and essayist

Also may refer to:

- Dragutin Gorjanović-Kramberger (1856–1936), Croatian geologist, paleontologist and archeologist
