= Praprotnica =

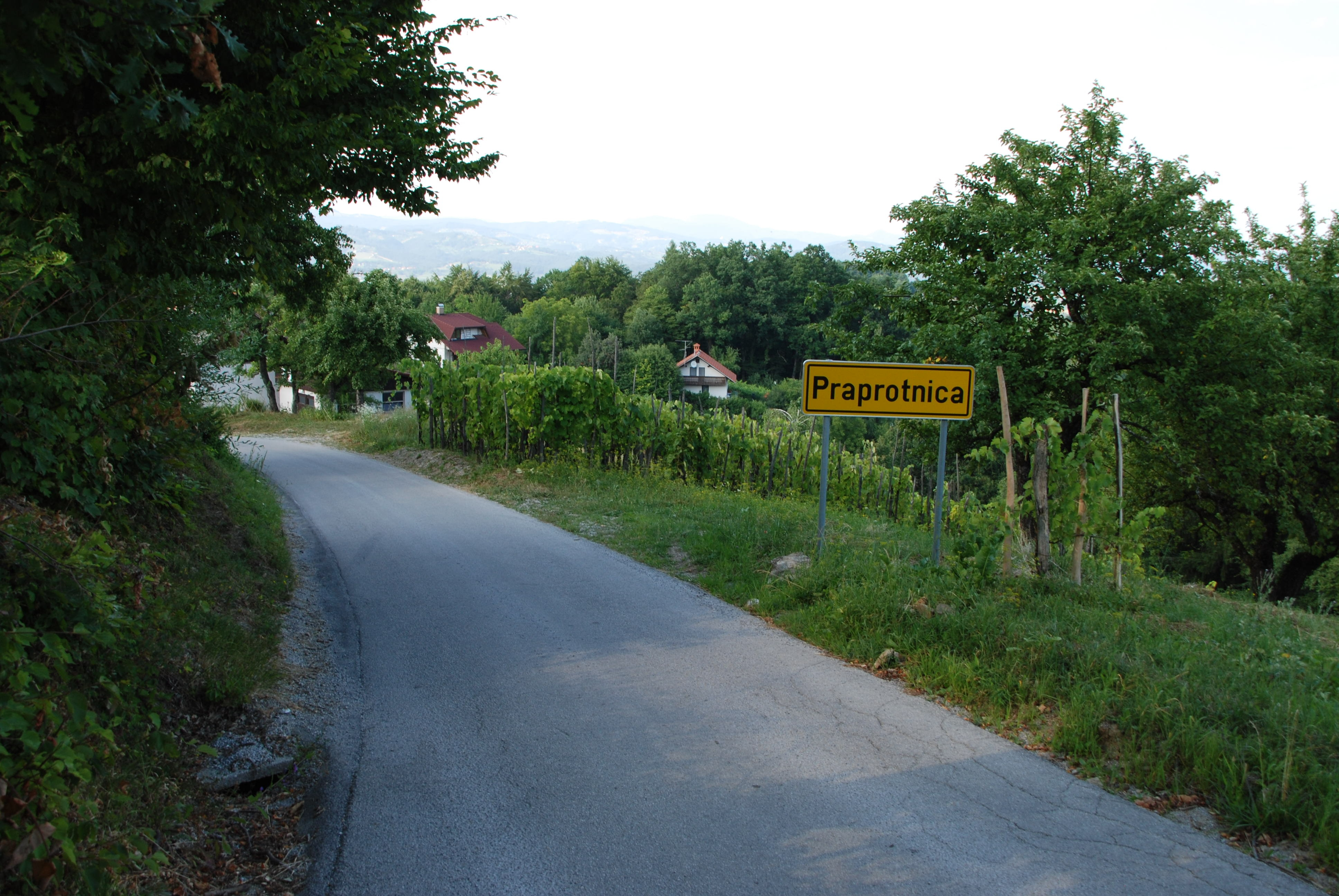

- Location in Slovenia
- Coordinates: 45°55′57.6″N 15°4′33.86″E
- Country: Slovenia
- Traditional region: Lower Carniola
- Statistical region: Southeast Slovenia
- Municipality: Mirna

Area
  - Total: 0.68 km^{2} (0.26 sq mi)
- Elevation: 381.9 m (1,253 ft)

Population (2002)
  - Total: 28

Praprotnica (pronounced [ˈpɾaːpɾɔtnitsa]) is a small settlement in the Municipality of Mirna in southeastern Slovenia. It lies above Zabrdje to the south of Mirna. The area is part of the traditional region of Lower Carniola. The municipality is now included in the Southeast Slovenia Statistical Region.
