= Tone Peršak =

Slovenian writer and politician

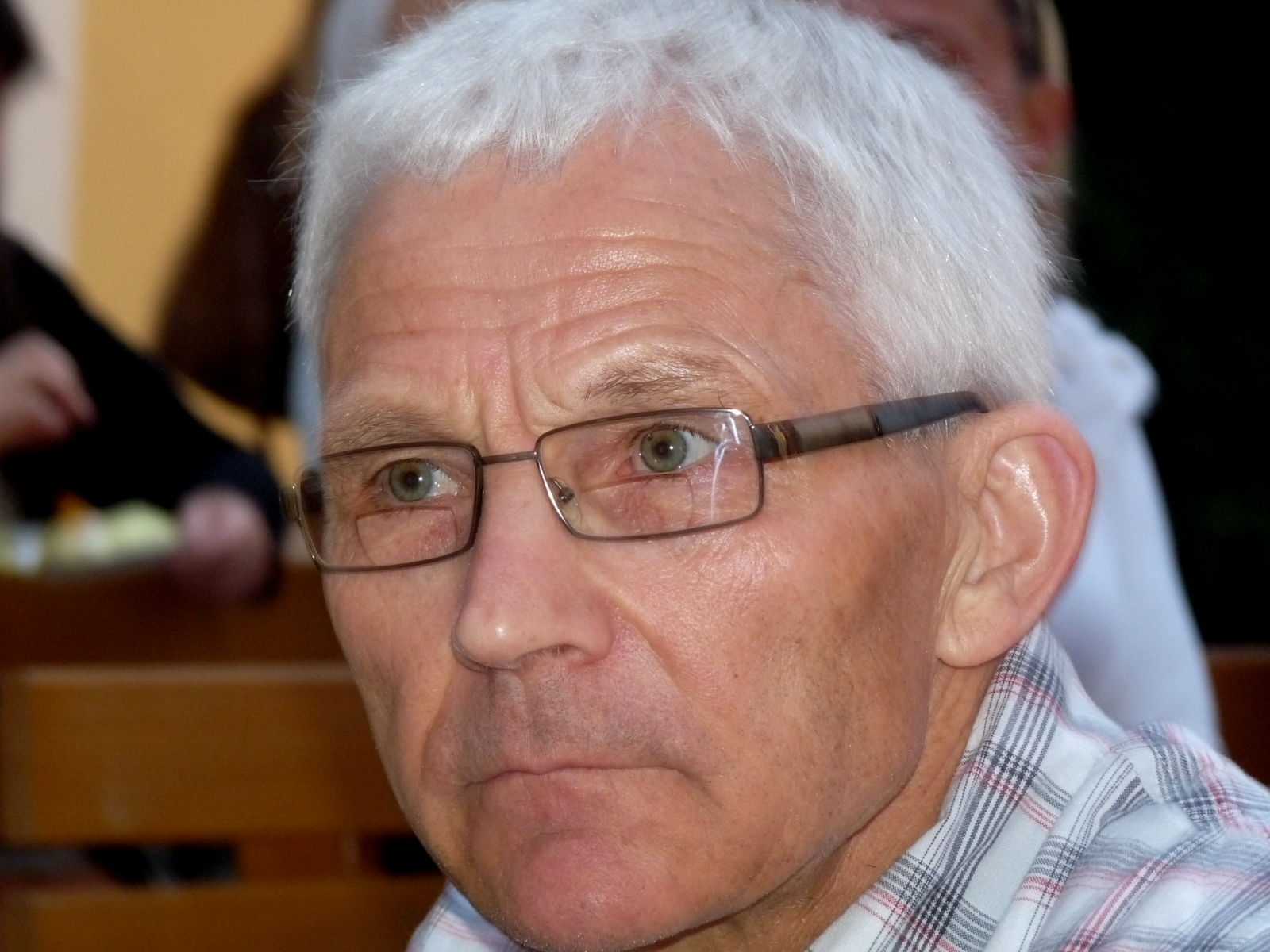
- Born: 7 January 1947; Ločki Vrh, Socialist Federal Republic of Yugoslavia (now in Slovenia)
- Occupations: Politician, theatre director, writer, journalist
- Writing career
- Notable works: Prehod, Smer Hamburg-Altona

Tone Peršak (born 7 January 1947) is a Slovene writer, politician, theatre director and journalist. He was elected to the first Slovenian National Assembly in 1992. He was also president of the Slovene Writers' Association for one term between 2001 and 2003.

Peršak was born in 1947 in Ločki Vrh in eastern Slovenia. After attending secondary school in Murska Sobota and obtained a degree from the University of Ljubljana in comparative literature and a degree in theatre and radio directing from the Ljubljana Academy for Theatre, Radio, Film and Television. In 1992 he was elected to the Slovenian National Assembly on the Democratic Party of Slovenia platform. He participated in various commissions including European affairs, infrastructure and environment, culture-education-sport, and others. He was also president of the Slovene centre of International PEN. He has been mayor of Trzin since 1999.

== Published works ==
- Novelete (1981)
- Prehod (1982)
- Sledi (1985)
- Vrh (1986)
- Smer Hamburg-Altona (1988)
- Ljubljanske novele (1989)
