= Škoflje =

Škoflje refers to the following places in Slovenia:

- Škoflje, Divača
- Škoflje, Ivančna Gorica
