= Zahrib, Litija =

Zahrib
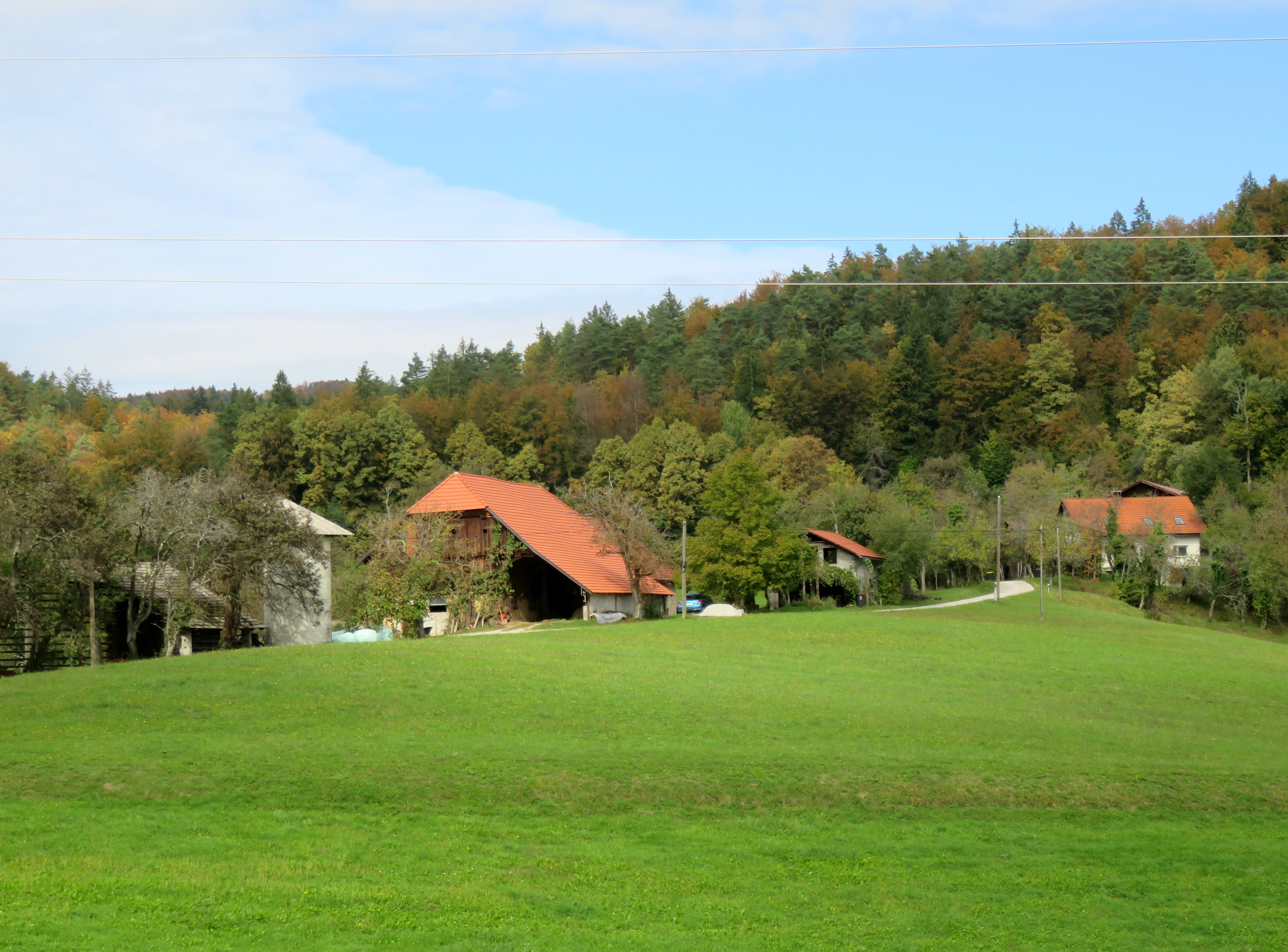

- Location in Slovenia
- Coordinates: 46°6′17″N 14°51′47″E
- Country: Slovenia
- Traditional region: Lower Carniola
- Statistical region: Central Sava
- Municipality: Litija
- Elevation: 418 m (1,371 ft)

Zahrib (Slovene pronunciation: [zaˈxɾiːp], German: Sahrib) is a former settlement in the Municipality of Litija in central Slovenia. It is now part of the village of Cirkuše. The area is part of the traditional region of Upper Carniola and is now included with the rest of the municipality in the Central Sava Statistical Region.

== Geography ==
Zahrib stands in the northern part of Cirkuše. Janež Spring lies to the southwest, and Kladivo and Koštrun springs to the northeast; the latter flows year round.

== History ==
Zahrib had a population of 62 living in seven houses in 1880, and 43 living in eight houses in 1900. Zahrib was annexed by Cirkuše in 1955, ending its existence as a separate settlement.
