= Zabrdje =

Zabrdje may refer to:

- Zabrđe (Ugljevik), a village in the Municipality of Ugljevik, Bosnia and Herzegovina
- Zabrdje, Mirna, a settlement in the Municipality of Mirna, southeastern Slovenia
