= Spodnji Gasteraj =

- Location in Slovenia
- Coordinates: 46°36′42.67″N 15°48′12.88″E
- Country: Slovenia
- Traditional region: Styria
- Statistical region: Drava
- Municipality: Sveti Jurij v Slovenskih Goricah

Area
  - Total: 4.32 km^{2} (1.67 sq mi)
- Elevation: 311.1 m (1,021 ft)

Population (2002)
  - Total: 297

Spodnji Gasteraj (pronounced [ˈspoːdnji ɡastɛˈɾaːi̯]) is a settlement in the Municipality of Sveti Jurij v Slovenskih Goricah in northeastern Slovenia. The area is part of the traditional region of Styria. It is now included in the Drava Statistical Region.

A small chapel-shrine in the settlement dates to the early 20th century.
