= Jurovski Dol =

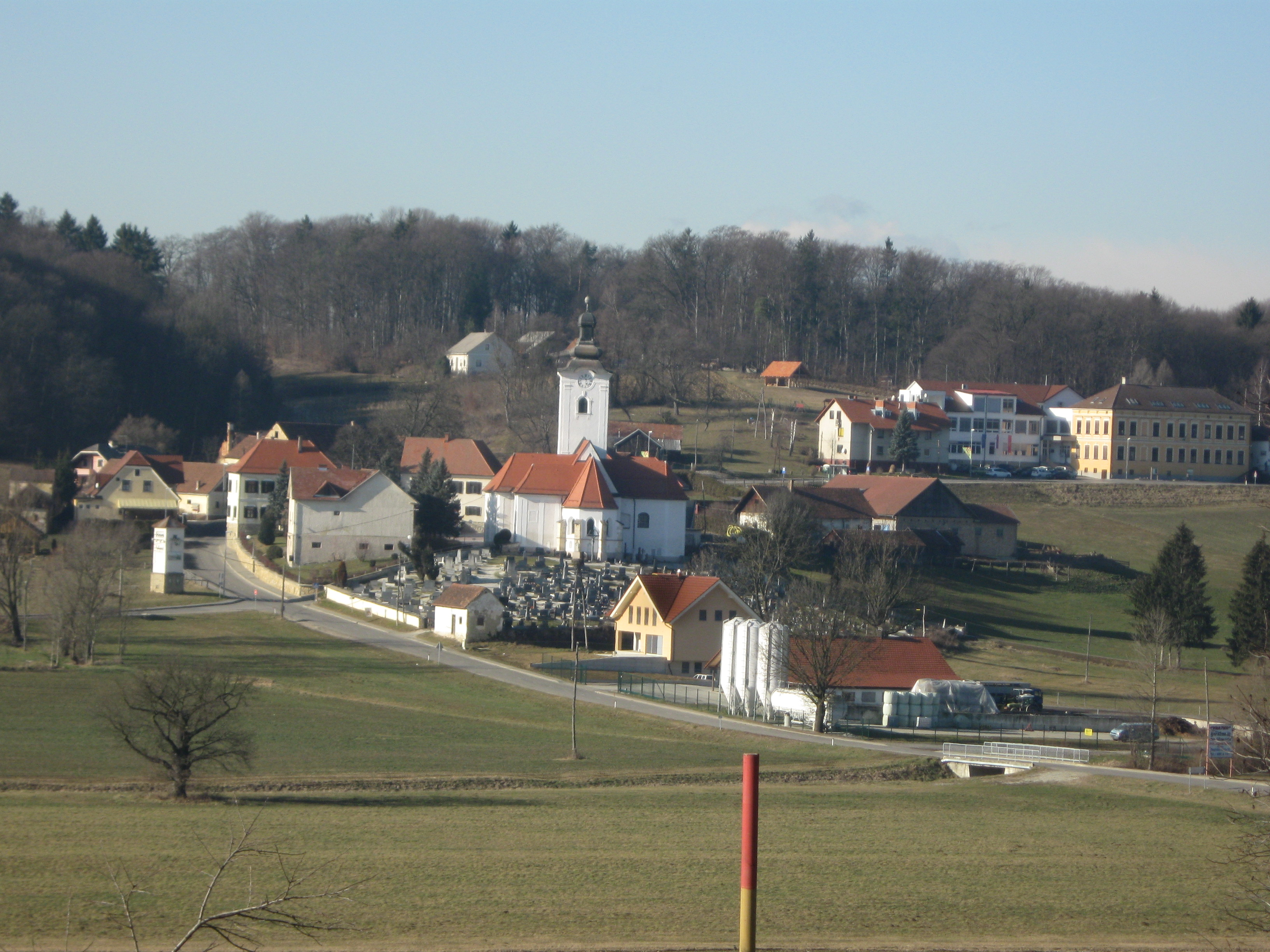

- Location in Slovenia
- Coordinates: 46°36′31.29″N 15°46′46.71″E
- Country: Slovenia
- Traditional region: Styria
- Statistical region: Drava
- Municipality: Sveti Jurij v Slovenskih Goricah

Area
  - Total: 5.16 km^{2} (1.99 sq mi)
- Elevation: 286.6 m (940 ft)

Population (2002)
  - Total: 361
- Climate: Cfb

Jurovski Dol (pronounced [ˈjuːɾɔu̯ski ˈdoːl]) is a settlement in the Municipality of Sveti Jurij v Slovenskih Goricah in northeastern Slovenia. It is the administrative centre of the municipality. The area is part of the traditional region of Styria. It is now included in the Drava Statistical Region.

The parish church in the settlement, from which the municipality also gets its name, is dedicated to Saint George (Slovene: sveti Jurij) and belongs to the Roman Catholic Archdiocese of Maribor. It is a Gothic building dating to the early 16th century with Baroque side chapels.

The philanthropist and politician Ivan Kramberger was assassinated in Jurovski Dol in 1992.
