= Ravne, Mirna =

Ravne
- Location in Slovenia
- Coordinates: 45°57′40.38″N 15°0′21.8″E
- Country: Slovenia
- Traditional region: Lower Carniola
- Statistical region: Southeast Slovenia
- Municipality: Mirna

Area
  - Total: 0.77 km^{2} (0.30 sq mi)
- Elevation: 411.2 m (1,349 ft)

Population (2002)
  - Total: 10

Ravne (pronounced [ˈɾáːwnɛ]) is a small settlement in the hills in the Municipality of Mirna in southeastern Slovenia. The area is part of the traditional region of Lower Carniola. The municipality is now included in the Southeast Slovenia Statistical Region.
