= Drvanja =

- Location in Slovenia
- Coordinates: 46°37′42.74″N 15°52′16.83″E
- Country: Slovenia
- Traditional region: Styria
- Statistical region: Drava
- Municipality: Benedikt

Area
  - Total: 2.98 km^{2} (1.15 sq mi)
- Elevation: 264.7 m (868 ft)

Population (2020)
  - Total: 177
  - Density: 59.4/km^{2} (154/sq mi)

Drvanja (pronounced [dəɾˈʋaːnja]) is a settlement in the Slovene Hills (Slovene: Slovenske gorice) in the Municipality of Benedikt in northeastern Slovenia. The area is part of the traditional region of Styria. It is now included in the Drava Statistical Region.

A small chapel-shrine in the settlement dates to 1910.

Traces of a Roman-period settlement and a burial ground have been identified near the settlement.
