= Sajenice =

- Location in Slovenia
- Coordinates: 45°57′54.93″N 15°2′0.74″E
- Country: Slovenia
- Traditional region: Lower Carniola
- Statistical region: Southeast Slovenia
- Municipality: Mirna

Area
  - Total: 0.34 km^{2} (0.13 sq mi)
- Elevation: 367.7 m (1,206 ft)

Population (2002)
  - Total: 35

Sajenice (pronounced [sajɛˈniːtsɛ]) is a small settlement in the Municipality of Mirna in southeastern Slovenia. It lies on the regional road leading northwest out of Mirna towards Gabrovka and Litija. The area is part of the traditional region of Lower Carniola. The municipality is now included in the Southeast Slovenia Statistical Region.
