= Negovski Vrh =

- Location in Slovenia
- Coordinates: 46°36′25.87″N 15°54′35.64″E
- Country: Slovenia
- Traditional region: Styria
- Statistical region: Drava
- Municipality: Benedikt

Area
  - Total: 0.34 km^{2} (0.13 sq mi)
- Elevation: 285.4 m (936 ft)

Population (2020)
  - Total: 18
  - Density: 53/km^{2} (140/sq mi)

Negovski Vrh (pronounced [ˈneːɡɔu̯ski ˈʋəɾx]) is a small settlement in the Municipality of Benedikt in northeastern Slovenia. It lies in the Slovene Hills (Slovene: Slovenske gorice). The area is part of the traditional region of Styria. The entire municipality is now included in the Drava Statistical Region.
