= Zgornja Bačkova =

- Location in Slovenia
- Coordinates: 46°38′57.89″N 15°52′16.16″E
- Country: Slovenia
- Traditional region: Styria
- Statistical region: Drava
- Municipality: Sveta Ana

Area
  - Total: 1.06 km^{2} (0.41 sq mi)
- Elevation: 311.7 m (1,023 ft)

Population (2002)
  - Total: 44

Zgornja Bačkova (pronounced [ˈzɡoːɾnja ˈbaːtʃkɔʋa]) is a small settlement in the Municipality of Sveta Ana in the Slovene Hills in northeastern Slovenia.

== History ==
Zgornja Bačkova was created as a separate settlement in 1963, when the former village of Bačkova was split into this settlement and neighboring Spodnja Bačkova.
