= Stara Gora, Mirna =

Stara Gora
- Location in Slovenia
- Coordinates: 45°55′31.09″N 15°4′49.89″E
- Country: Slovenia
- Traditional region: Lower Carniola
- Statistical region: Southeast Slovenia
- Municipality: Mirna

Area
  - Total: 2.62 km^{2} (1.01 sq mi)
- Elevation: 440.7 m (1,446 ft)

Population (2002)
  - Total: 30

Stara Gora (pronounced [ˈstaːra ˈɡɔːra]) is a settlement in the hills in the Municipality of Mirna in southeastern Slovenia. The area is part of the traditional region of Lower Carniola and is now included in the Southeast Slovenia Statistical Region.
