= Spodnja Bačkova =

- Location in Slovenia
- Coordinates: 46°38′14.83″N 15°52′56.38″E
- Country: Slovenia
- Traditional region: Styria
- Statistical region: Drava
- Municipality: Benedikt

Area
  - Total: 2.45 km^{2} (0.95 sq mi)
- Elevation: 304.5 m (999 ft)

Population (2020)
  - Total: 132
  - Density: 53.9/km^{2} (140/sq mi)

Spodnja Bačkova (pronounced [ˈspoːdnja ˈbaːtʃkɔʋa]) is a settlement in the Slovene Hills (Slovene: Slovenske gorice) in the Municipality of Benedikt in northeastern Slovenia. The area is part of the traditional region of Styria. It is now included in the Drava Statistical Region.

== History ==
Spodnja Bačkova was created as a separate settlement in 1963, when the former village of Bačkova was split into this settlement and neighboring Zgornja Bačkova.

== Cultural heritage ==
A small hexagonal chapel-shrine in the settlement dates to 1871.
