= Debenec =

- Location in Slovenia
- Coordinates: 45°55′33.88″N 15°6′3.42″E
- Country: Slovenia
- Traditional region: Lower Carniola
- Statistical region: Southeast Slovenia
- Municipality: Mirna

Area
  - Total: 2.62 km^{2} (1.01 sq mi)
- Elevation: 498.7 m (1,636 ft)

Population (2002)
  - Total: 32

Debenec (pronounced [dɛˈbɛːnəts] or [dəˈbɛːnəts]) is a small settlement in the hills in the Municipality of Mirna in southeastern Slovenia. The area is part of the traditional region of Lower Carniola. The municipality is now included in the Southeast Slovenia Statistical Region.

A small chapel in the western part of the settlement is dedicated to Saint Anne and belongs to the parish of Mirna. It was built in 1834.
