= Štajngrova =

- Location in Slovenia
- Coordinates: 46°36′56.88″N 15°54′6.08″E
- Country: Slovenia
- Traditional region: Styria
- Statistical region: Drava
- Municipality: Benedikt

Area
  - Total: 0.91 km^{2} (0.35 sq mi)
- Elevation: 318.2 m (1,044 ft)

Population (2020)
  - Total: 234
  - Density: 260/km^{2} (670/sq mi)

Štajngrova (pronounced [ˈʃtaːi̯nɡɾɔʋa], in older sources also Stangrov, German: Stangelberg) is a settlement in the Slovene Hills (Slovene: Slovenske gorice) in the Municipality of Benedikt in northeastern Slovenia. The area is part of the traditional region of Styria. It is now included in the Drava Statistical Region.

A wayside shrine with a 3-meter (9.8 ft) tall niche containing a crucifix dates to around 1900.
