= Malna =

- Location in Slovenia
- Coordinates: 46°37′27.17″N 15°46′21.18″E
- Country: Slovenia
- Traditional region: Styria
- Statistical region: Drava
- Municipality: Sveti Jurij v Slovenskih Goricah

Area
  - Total: 4.42 km^{2} (1.71 sq mi)
- Elevation: 266.4 m (874 ft)

Population (2002)
  - Total: 253

Malna (pronounced [ˈmaːlna]) is a settlement in the Municipality of Sveti Jurij v Slovenskih Goricah in northeastern Slovenia. It lies in the western part of the Slovene Hills. The area is part of the traditional region of Styria. It is now included in the Drava Statistical Region.

There are two small chapels in the settlement. Both date to early 20th century.
