= Migolica =

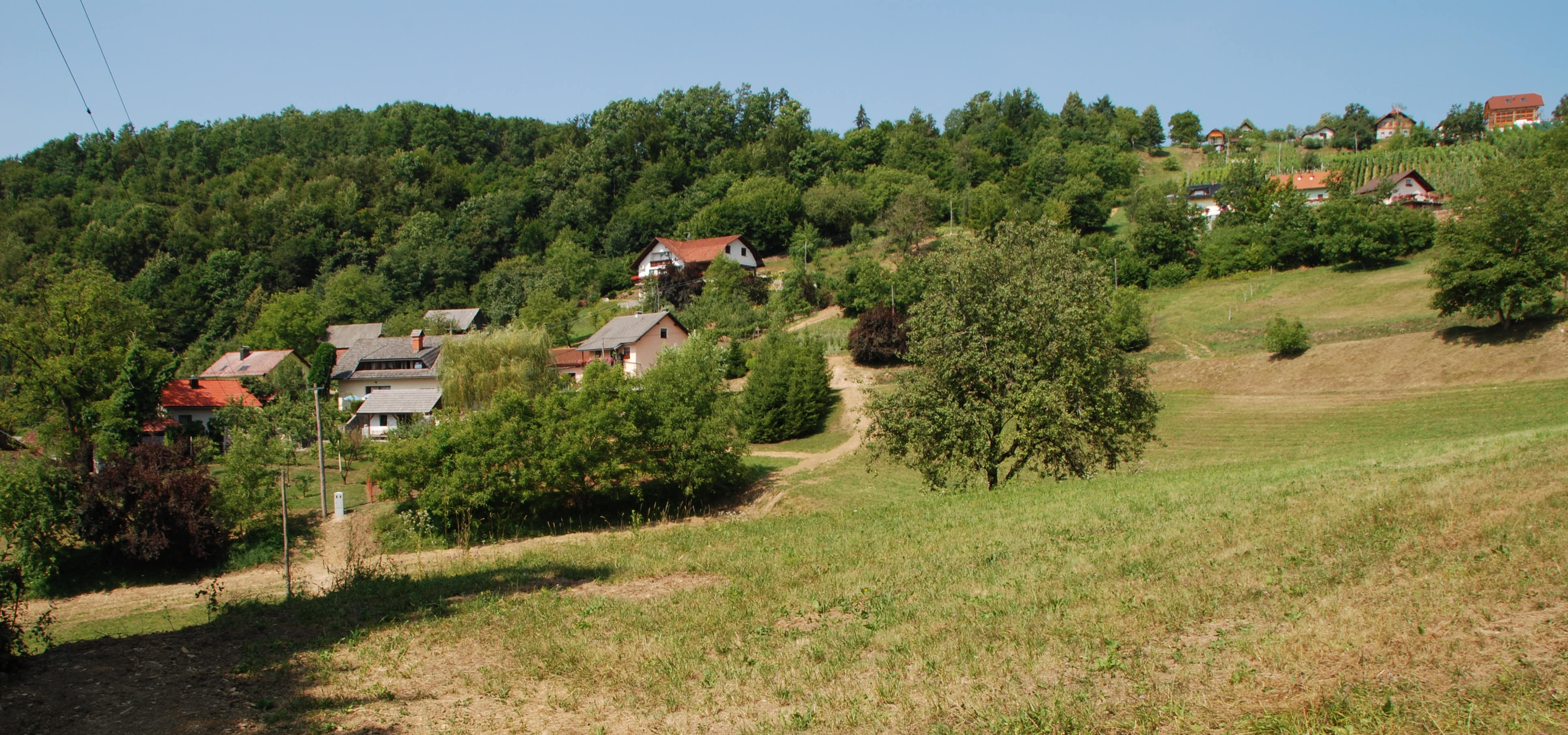

- Location in Slovenia
- Coordinates: 45°57′37.44″N 15°2′20.24″E
- Country: Slovenia
- Traditional region: Lower Carniola
- Statistical region: Southeast Slovenia
- Municipality: Mirna

Area
  - Total: 0.86 km^{2} (0.33 sq mi)
- Elevation: 310.9 m (1,020 ft)

Population (2002)
  - Total: 74

Migolica (pronounced [ˈmiːɡɔlitsa]) is a small settlement in the Municipality of Mirna in southeastern Slovenia. The Mirna River runs along the southern edge of the settlement territory. The area is part of the traditional region of Lower Carniola. The municipality is now included in the Southeast Slovenia Statistical Region.
