= Stan, Mirna =

Stan
- Location in Slovenia
- Coordinates: 45°56′7.62″N 15°5′5.91″E
- Country: Slovenia
- Traditional region: Lower Carniola
- Statistical region: Southeast Slovenia
- Municipality: Mirna

Area
  - Total: 2.06 km^{2} (0.80 sq mi)
- Elevation: 380.2 m (1,247 ft)

Population (2002)
  - Total: 84

Stan (pronounced [ˈstaːn]) is a settlement in the hills to the southeast of Mirna in the Municipality of Mirna in southeastern Slovenia. The municipality is included in the Southeast Slovenia Statistical Region. The area is part of the traditional region of Lower Carniola.
