= Selska Gora =

- Location in Slovenia
- Coordinates: 45°57′42.96″N 15°1′25.44″E
- Country: Slovenia
- Traditional region: Lower Carniola
- Statistical region: Southeast Slovenia
- Municipality: Mirna

Area
  - Total: 1.26 km^{2} (0.49 sq mi)
- Elevation: 395.6 m (1,298 ft)

Population (2002)
  - Total: 22

Selska Gora (pronounced [ˈseːu̯ska ˈɡɔːra]) is a small dispersed settlement in the Municipality of Mirna in southeastern Slovenia. It lies in the hills west of Mirna in the traditional region of Lower Carniola. The municipality is now included in the Southeast Slovenia Statistical Region.
