= Peter Pavel Glavar =

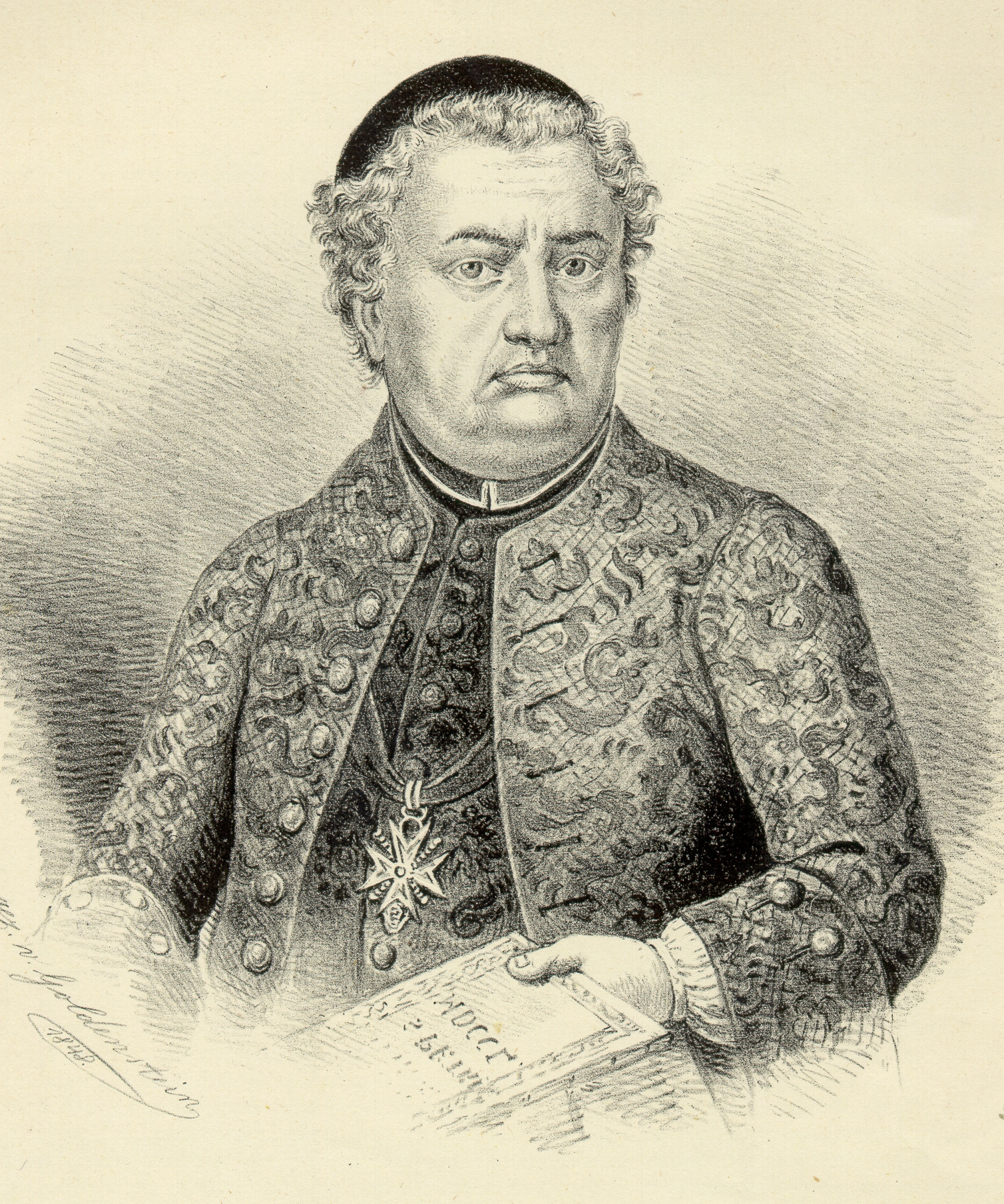
- Born: 2 May 1721; Ljubljana
- Died: 24 January 1784 (aged 62)
- Occupations: Roman Catholic priest beekeeper writer businessman

Peter Pavel Glavar (2 May 1721 – 24 January 1784) was a Carniolan Roman Catholic priest, beekeeper, writer, and businessman.

Glavar was born in Ljubljana as an illegitimate child of the Maltese noble Pietro Giacomo de Testaferrata and a local servant. While Testaferrata did not acknowledge him, he contributed to his upkeep; the boy was raised in Vopovlje in northern Carniola. A quick study, he was sent to seminary in Ljubljana and (in about 1738) Graz, where he was granted a master of liberal arts (Latin: magister artium liberalium) degree, and became acquainted with the economic theories of the French physiocrats. His education was broad, and he was fluent in several European languages.

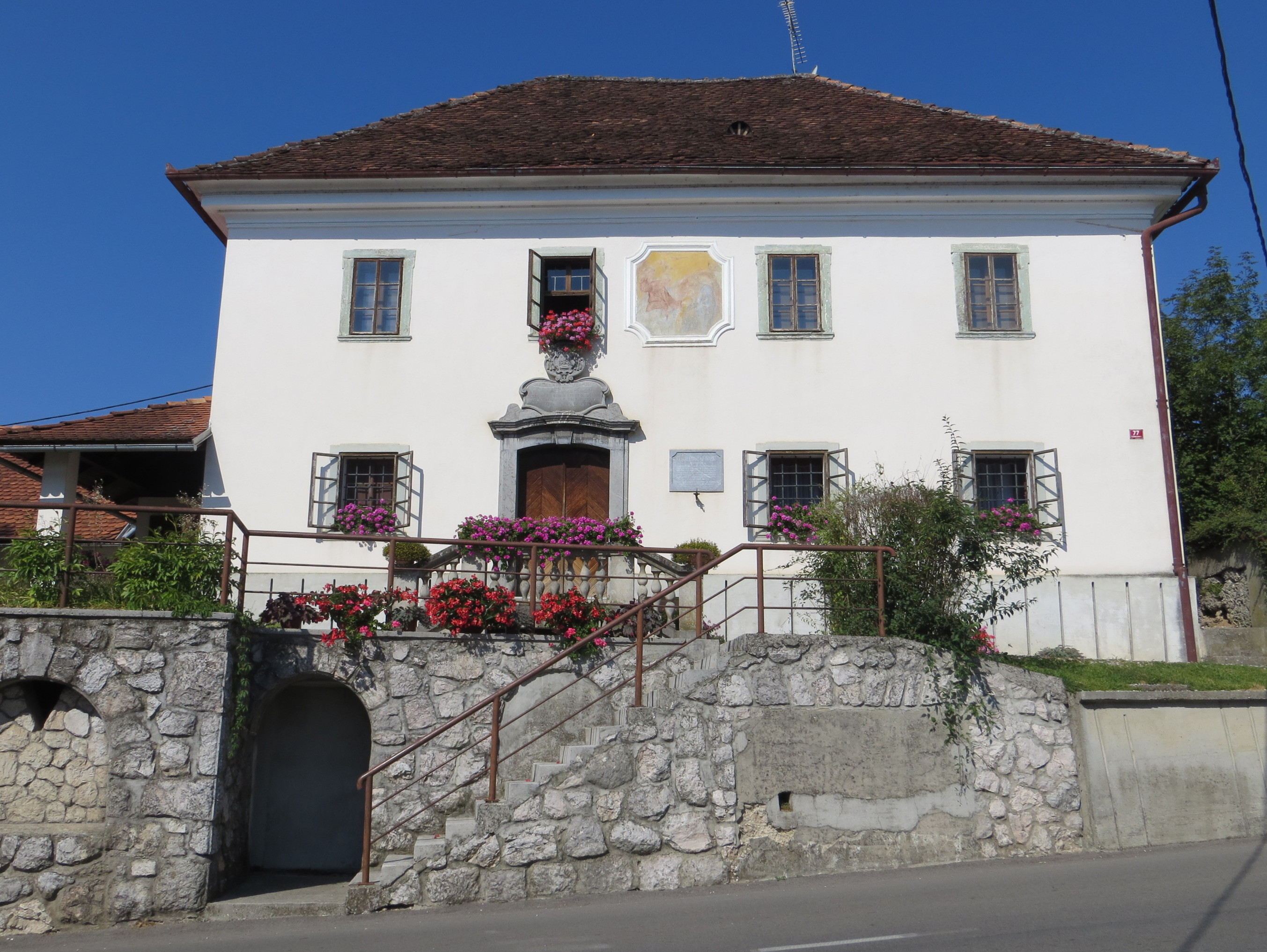
Glavar's house in Komenda

Glavar returned to Carniola around 1743. He settled in Komenda in northern Carniola, where he established a school in 1751; the following year, he endowed a library, which is still extant and comprises around 2,000 books on diverse subjects. A mighty lime tree in Komenda bears Glavar's, and is thought to have been planted by him around 1748. Glavar was a supporter of poor students, and a patron of the arts; he commissioned the painter Franc Jelovšek to decorate the beneficiary house and the parish church. From 1754 until 1760, Glavar edited the first Slovene-language parish family book, in which he recorded the actuarial data of the inhabitants of Komenda. In 1761–66, he erected the high-baroque St. Anne's Church in Tunjice.

In 1766, Glavar bought Lanšprež Castle (German: Landspreis) in Gomila near Mirna in the central Carniola, where he kept an apiary with about 200 quite profitable hives. He also established a beekeeping school there, and wrote several texts on beekeeping. These included the Pogovor o čebelnih rojih (Discourse on Bee Swarms) from 1776–78, notable as the first Slovene-language scholarly text; lost for almost two centuries, a copy was discovered and published only in 1976.

Glavar died at Lanšprež Castle in 1784, aged 62. He left his assets to the poor; some of them were used to endow the Glavar Hospital in Komenda in 1804.

In 2006, RTV Slovenia produced a documentary about him.
