= Varda, Sveti Jurij v Slovenskih Goricah =

Varda
- Location in Slovenia
- Coordinates: 46°35′25.06″N 15°47′8.77″E
- Country: Slovenia
- Traditional region: Stryia
- Statistical region: Drava
- Municipality: Sveti Jurij v Slovenskih Goricah

Area
  - Total: 0.81 km^{2} (0.31 sq mi)
- Elevation: 295.9 m (971 ft)

Population (2002)
  - Total: 102

Varda (pronounced [ˈʋaːɾda]) is a small settlement in the Municipality of Sveti Jurij v Slovenskih Goricah in northeastern Slovenia. The area is part of the traditional region of Styria. It is now included in the Drava Statistical Region.

Two small roadside chapel-shrines in the settlement date to 1865 and the early 20th century.

A number of Roman period burial mounds have been identified near the settlement.
