= Volčje Njive =

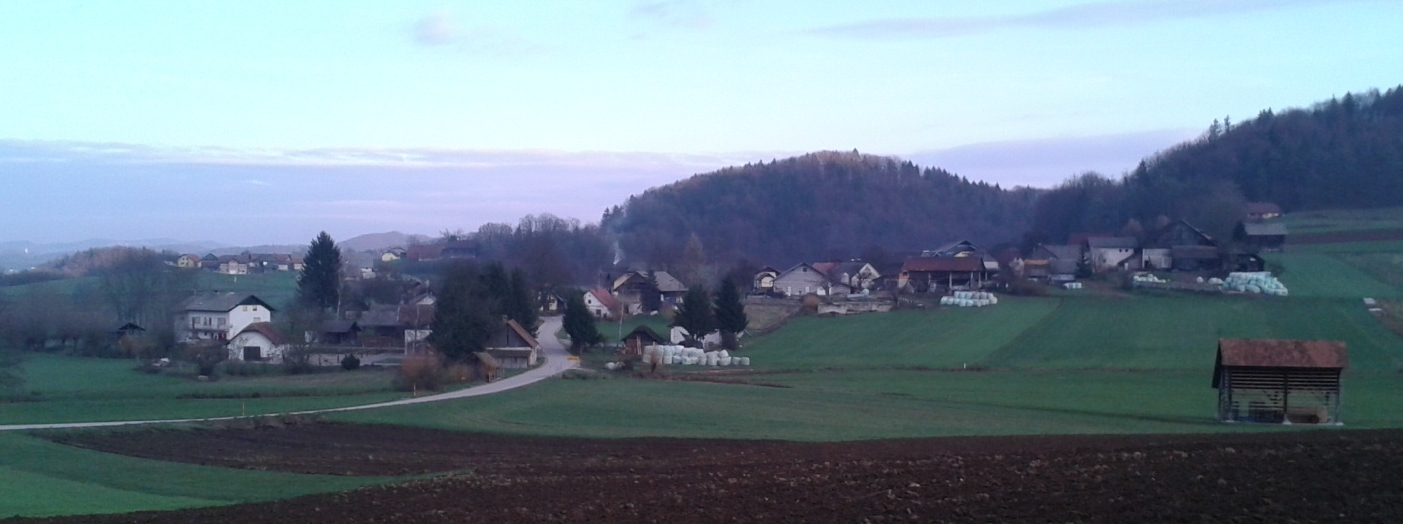

- Location in Slovenia
- Coordinates: 45°56′37.74″N 15°5′13.85″E
- Country: Slovenia
- Traditional region: Lower Carniola
- Statistical region: Southeast Slovenia
- Municipality: Mirna

Area
  - Total: 1.49 km^{2} (0.58 sq mi)
- Elevation: 252.3 m (828 ft)

Population (2002)
  - Total: 46

Volčje Njive (pronounced [ˈʋoːu̯tʃjɛ ˈnjiːʋɛ]) is a small settlement just east of Mirna in the Municipality of Mirna in southeastern Slovenia. The municipality is included in the Southeast Slovenia Statistical Region. The entire area is part of the traditional region of Lower Carniola.

== Name ==
Volčje Njive was attested in historical sources as Weyczakker in 1436 and as Weizakker and Wetschakker in 1455.
