= Gomila, Mirna =

Gomila
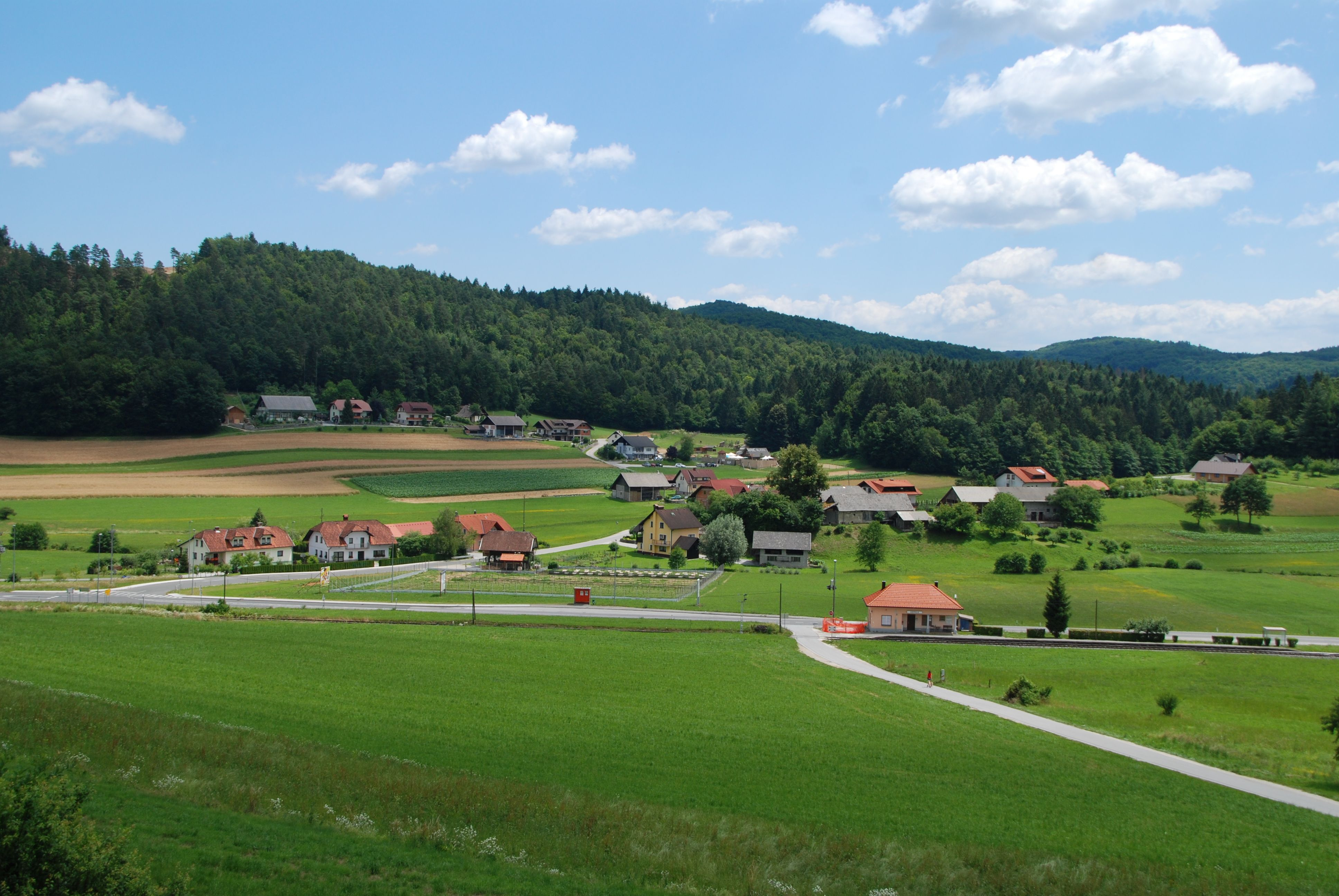

- Location in Slovenia
- Coordinates: 45°56′2.19″N 15°2′48.49″E
- Country: Slovenia
- Traditional region: Lower Carniola
- Statistical region: Southeast Slovenia
- Municipality: Mirna

Area
  - Total: 2.22 km^{2} (0.86 sq mi)
- Elevation: 261.7 m (859 ft)

Population (2012)
  - Total: 86
  - Density: 39/km^{2} (100/sq mi)

Gomila (pronounced [ɡɔˈmiːla]) is a settlement in the Municipality of Mirna in southeastern Slovenia. The area is part of the traditional region of Lower Carniola. The municipality is now included in the Southeast Slovenia Statistical Region. The rail line from Sevnica to Trebnje runs through the settlement and has a station there.

Some remains of Lanšprež Castle (German: Landspreis) from the 16th century, a chapel built in the second half of the 18th century by Peter Pavel Glavar, and the area of the castle park are located in Gomila. The castle gradually decayed after 1952.
