= Gorenja Vas pri Mirni =

- Location in Slovenia
- Coordinates: 45°56′53.06″N 15°2′3.49″E
- Country: Slovenia
- Traditional region: Lower Carniola
- Statistical region: Southeast Slovenia
- Municipality: Mirna

Area
  - Total: 1.73 km^{2} (0.67 sq mi)
- Elevation: 315.9 m (1,036 ft)

Population (2002)
  - Total: 76

Gorenja Vas pri Mirni (pronounced [ɡɔˈɾèːnja ˈʋáːs pɾi ˈmìːɾni, - ˈmíː-]) is a small settlement in the Municipality of Mirna in southeastern Slovenia. The area is part of the traditional region of Lower Carniola. The municipality is now included in the Southeast Slovenia Statistical Region.

== Name ==
The name of the settlement was changed from Gorenja vas to Gorenja vas pri Mirni in 1953.
