= Glinek, Mirna =

Glinek
- Location in Slovenia
- Coordinates: 45°56′42.57″N 15°5′39.4″E
- Country: Slovenia
- Traditional region: Lower Carniola
- Statistical region: Southeast Slovenia
- Municipality: Mirna

Area
  - Total: 1.24 km^{2} (0.48 sq mi)
- Elevation: 261.5 m (858 ft)

Population (2002)
  - Total: 24

Glinek (pronounced [ˈɡliːnək]) is a small settlement on the right bank of the Mirna River in the Municipality of Mirna in southeastern Slovenia. The area is part of the traditional region of Lower Carniola. The municipality is now included in the Southeast Slovenia Statistical Region.

Six burial mounds close to the settlement date to the Early Iron Age.
