= Trbinc =

- Location in Slovenia
- Coordinates: 45°56′55.63″N 15°2′58.29″E
- Country: Slovenia
- Traditional region: Lower Carniola
- Statistical region: Southeast Slovenia
- Municipality: Mirna

Area
  - Total: 1.04 km^{2} (0.40 sq mi)
- Elevation: 367.6 m (1,206 ft)

Population (2002)
  - Total: 59

Trbinc (pronounced [təɾˈbiːnts]) is a settlement immediately west of Mirna in the Municipality of Mirna in southeastern Slovenia. The area is part of the traditional region of Lower Carniola. The municipality is now included in the Southeast Slovenia Statistical Region.

An Iron Age settlement has been identified near the settlement.
