= Municipality of Sveti Jurij v Slovenskih Goricah =

Municipality of Slovenia

Municipality of Sveti Jurij v Slovenskih Goricah Občina Sveti Jurij v Slovenskih goricah
- Municipality
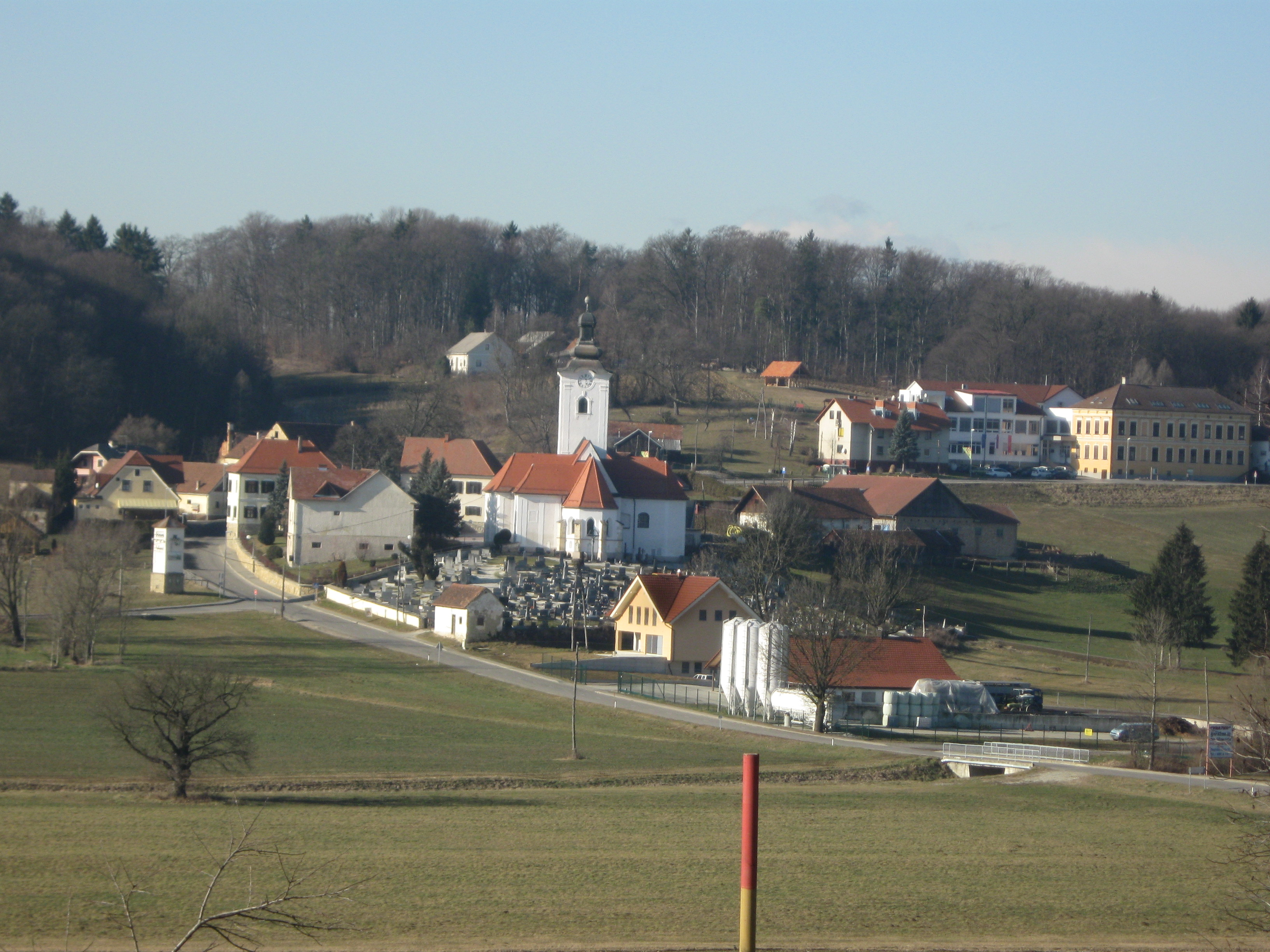

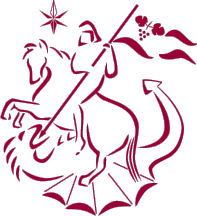
- Coat of arms

- Location of the Municipality of Sveti Jurij v Slovenskih Goricah in Slovenia
- Coordinates: 46°36′3″N 15°47′3″E
- Country: Slovenia

Government
  - Mayor: Peter Škrlec

Area
  - Total: 34 km^{2} (13 sq mi)

Population (2019)
  - Total: 2,096
  - Density: 62/km^{2} (160/sq mi)
- Time zone: UTC+01 (CET)
  - Summer (DST): UTC+02 (CEST)
- Website: www.obcinajurij.si

The Municipality of Sveti Jurij v Slovenskih Goricah (pronounced [ˈsʋeːti ˈjuːɾii̯ ʍ slɔˈʋeːnskiɣ ɡɔˈɾiːtsax]; Slovene: Občina Sveti Jurij v Slovenskih goricah) is a municipality in northeastern Slovenia. It was created in 2006 when it separated from the Municipality of Lenart. It lies at the western end of the Slovene Hills (Slovene: Slovenske gorice). Its administrative centre is in Jurovski Dol. The area is part of the traditional region of Styria. It is now included in the Drava Statistical Region.

The municipality gets its name from the local parish church in Jurovski Dol, dedicated to Saint George (Slovene: sveti Jurij).

== Settlements ==
In addition to the municipal seat of Jurovski Dol, the municipality also includes the following settlements:

- Malna
- Spodnji Gasteraj
- Srednji Gasteraj
- Varda
- Zgornje Partinje
- Zgornji Gasteraj
- Žitence
