= Stara Gora, Benedikt =

Stara Gora
- Location in Slovenia
- Coordinates: 46°35′25.65″N 15°53′51.88″E
- Country: Slovenia
- Traditional region: Styria
- Statistical region: Drava
- Municipality: Benedikt

Area
  - Total: 0.32 km^{2} (0.12 sq mi)
- Elevation: 294.6 m (967 ft)

Population (2020)
  - Total: 20
  - Density: 62/km^{2} (160/sq mi)

Stara Gora pronounced [ˈstaːɾa ˈɡɔːɾa] is a small settlement in the Municipality of Benedikt in northeastern Slovenia. It lies in the Slovene Hills (Slovene: Slovenske gorice) above the valley of Drvanja Creek. The area is part of the traditional region of Styria. The entire municipality is now included in the Drava Statistical Region.
