= Ivan Kramberger =

Slovenian politician and writer (1936–1992)

Personal details
- Born: 4 May 1936 Ženjak, Kingdom of Yugoslavia (now Benedikt, Slovenia)
- Died: 7 June 1992 (aged 56) Jurovski Dol, Municipality of Lenart, Slovenia
- Manner of death: Assassination
- Party: Homeland National Party (1991-1992)

Ivan Kramberger; 4 May 1936 – 7 June 1992) was a Slovenian inventor, writer, philanthropist, and politician. In 1992, he was assassinated during his pre-election speech.

== Early life and career ==
Kramberger was born in Ženjak, a former village (now part of the settlement of Benedikt) in northeastern Slovenia, Kingdom of Yugoslavia. He was one of eleven children in a poor family. He made his fortune in Germany, where he worked as a hospital technician and patented a series of improvements for dialysis machines. The funds he had amassed through royalties on his patents, he distributed among the impoverished people in Slovenia in a Robin Hood manner, and he also purchased dialysis machines for hospitals in Slovenia. He lived a modest life with his wife and children, and enjoyed collecting and repairing vintage cars. He was also styled as the "Benefactor from Negova" (Slovene: dobrotnik iz Negove).

== Politician ==
He was an eccentric figure in the Slovene media and politics. He held populist political speeches at the Prešeren Square in the centre of Ljubljana. He was known for making long speeches - sometimes for hours on end - without using notes, and attracted huge crowds wherever he went. With popular backing, he was one of the candidates in the first round of the 1990 Slovenian presidential election, in which he obtained 18.5% of the votes and placed third. Two years later, he stated he would not be a candidate in the 1992 Slovenian presidential election, and would instead run with his political party in the 1992 Slovenian parliamentary election.

== Death ==
On 7 June 1992, Kramberger was shot dead in a small town as he was concluding a speech, just a few months before the official start of the election campaign. To this day, it is deemed that the results of the investigation were poor and that too many unusual circumstances have been left unexplained. Just two hours after the incident, the presumed shooter, Peter Rotar, was found in a highly intoxicated state and arrested. Neither the shell casing nor the bullet which had penetrated Kramberger's chest were ever found. Rotar supposedly shot Kramberger with a carbine from a great distance of 64 meters and at a difficult angle, and the trajectory of the bullet (which ricocheted after having been shot through Kramberger's body) was deemed to be close to impossible. This gave rise to rumors that Kramberger had been assassinated by a professional sharpshooter, possibly with ties to the Slovenian Army or the UDBA.

At the time of the arrest, Rotar admitted to committing the act, but denied having anything to do with the assassination when sober. He faced trial and was expeditiously sentenced to 12 years in prison. His supposed motivation for the murder was never explained. Rotar was released in May 2001, having served less than eight years in prison. From the time he was sentenced to the time of his death in January 2019, he continued to proclaim his innocence and claimed he had been used as a patsy.
