= Zgornje Partinje =

- Location in Slovenia
- Coordinates: 46°35′39.7″N 15°45′23.27″E
- Country: Slovenia
- Traditional region: Styria
- Statistical region: Drava
- Municipality: Sveti Jurij v Slovenskih Goricah

Area
  - Total: 7.35 km^{2} (2.84 sq mi)
- Elevation: 308 m (1,010 ft)

Population (2002)
  - Total: 583

Zgornje Partinje (pronounced [ˈzɡoːɾnjɛ paɾˈtiːnjɛ], German: Oberpartin) is a settlement in the Municipality of Sveti Jurij v Slovenskih Goricah in northeastern Slovenia. It is dispersed over a large area of the western Slovene Hills between Globovnica Creek and James Creek (Slovene: Jakobski potok), left tributaries of the Pesnica River. The area is part of the traditional region of Styria. It is now included in the Drava Statistical Region.
