= Ihova =

- Location in Slovenia
- Coordinates: 46°38′4.09″N 15°55′5.51″E
- Country: Slovenia
- Traditional region: Styria
- Statistical region: Drava
- Municipality: Benedikt

Area
  - Total: 3.28 km^{2} (1.27 sq mi)
- Elevation: 260.1 m (853 ft)

Population (2020)
  - Total: 275
  - Density: 83.8/km^{2} (217/sq mi)

Ihova (pronounced [ˈiːxɔʋa]) is a settlement in the Slovene Hills (Slovene: Slovenske gorice) in the Municipality of Benedikt in northeastern Slovenia. The area is part of the traditional region of Styria. It is now included in the Drava Statistical Region.

Remains of a Roman villa rustica have been identified near the settlement.
