= Sveti Trije Kralji v Slovenskih Goricah =

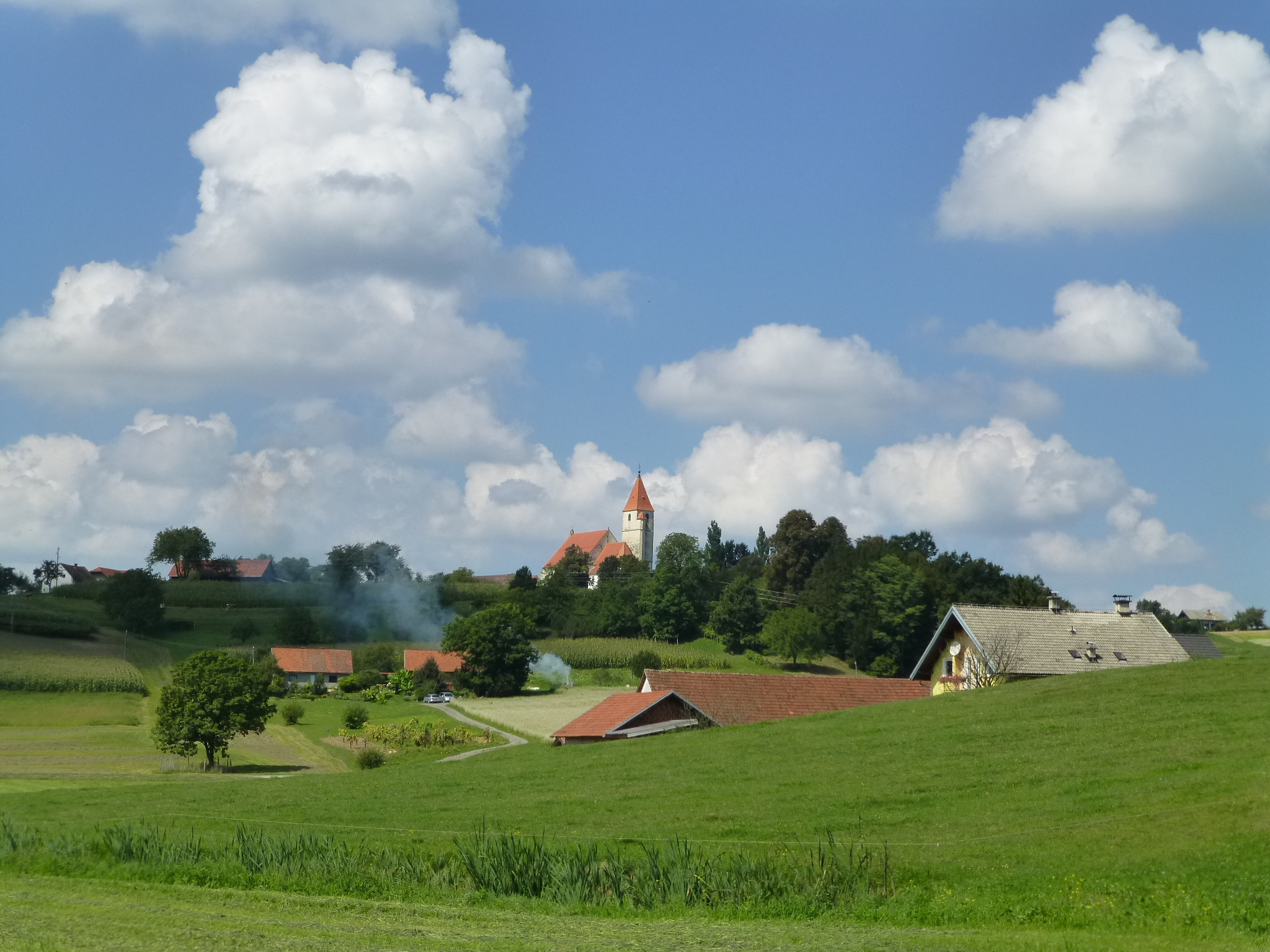

- Location in Slovenia
- Coordinates: 46°36′12.34″N 15°53′46.08″E
- Country: Slovenia
- Traditional region: Styria
- Statistical region: Drava
- Municipality: Benedikt

Area
  - Total: 0.3 km^{2} (0.12 sq mi)
- Elevation: 284.1 m (932 ft)

Population (2020)
  - Total: 130
  - Density: 430/km^{2} (1,100/sq mi)

Sveti Trije Kralji v Slovenskih Goricah (pronounced [ˈsʋeːti ˈtɾiːjɛ ˈkraːlji ʍ slɔˈʋeːnskiɣ ɡɔˈɾiːtsax]) is a small village in the Municipality of Benedikt in northeastern Slovenia. The area is part of the traditional region of Styria. It is now included in the Drava Statistical Region.

The local church from which the settlement gets its name is dedicated to the Three Kings (Slovene: Sveti Trije Kralji) and belongs to the Parish of Benedict. It was first mentioned in written documents dating to 1445 and was expanded in the early 16th century.
