= Selo pri Mirni =

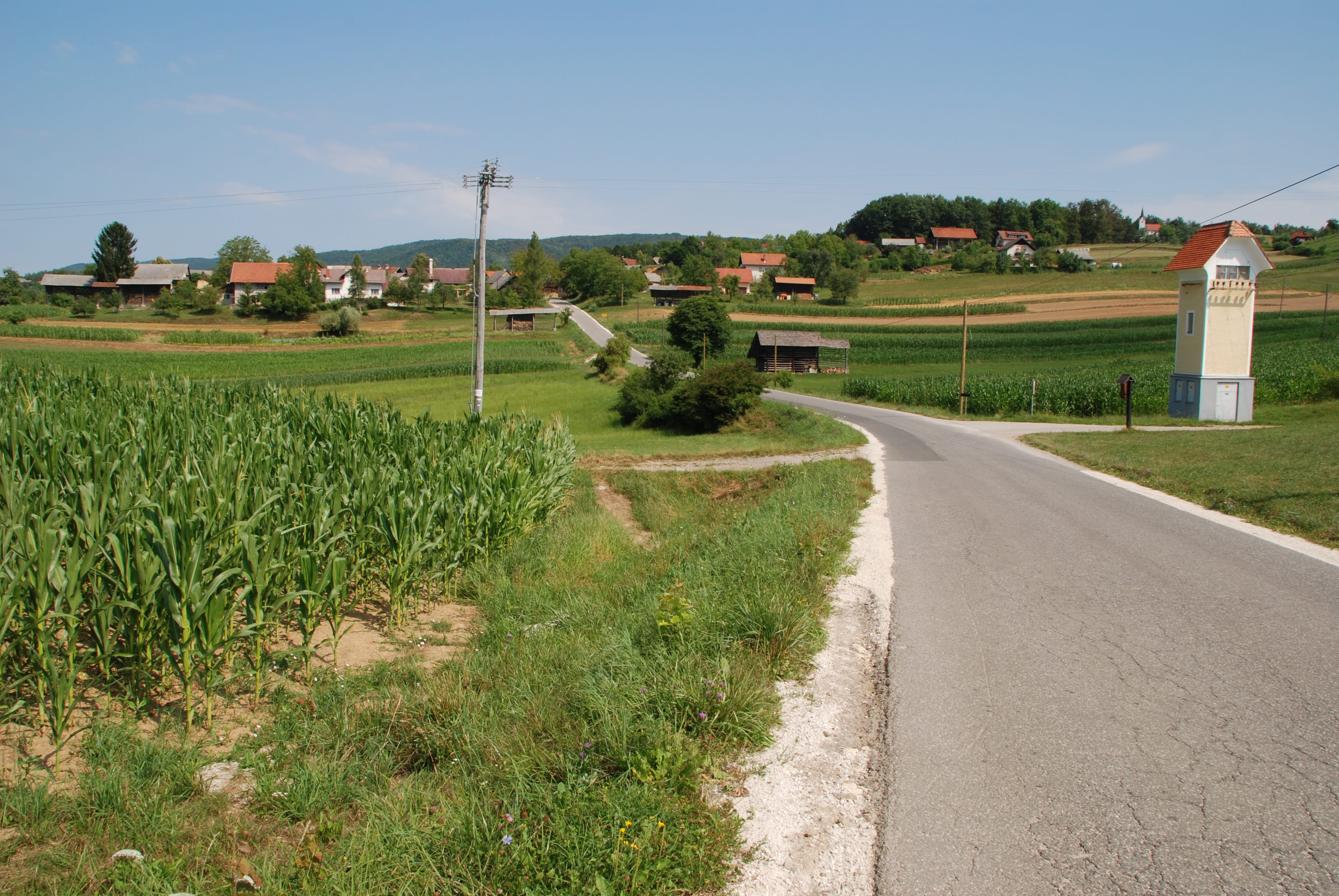

- Location in Slovenia
- Coordinates: 45°58′24.09″N 15°1′41.72″E
- Country: Slovenia
- Traditional region: Lower Carniola
- Statistical region: Southeast Slovenia
- Municipality: Mirna

Area
  - Total: 1.63 km^{2} (0.63 sq mi)
- Elevation: 368.1 m (1,208 ft)

Population (2002)
  - Total: 59

Selo pri Mirni (pronounced [ˈsɛ̀ːlɔ pɾi ˈmìːɾni, - ˈmíː-]) is a small village northwest of Mirna in the Municipality of Mirna in southeastern Slovenia. The area is part of the traditional region of Lower Carniola. The municipality is now included in the Southeast Slovenia Statistical Region.

== Name ==
The name of the settlement was changed from Selo to Selo pri Mirni in 1955.

== Church ==
The local church, built in the hamlet of Žunovec north of the settlement, is dedicated to Saint Peter and belongs to the Parish of Mirna. It is originally a Gothic building from at least the 16th century. The sanctuary dates to the 17th century and the belfry to the 19th century.
