= Zgornji Gasteraj =

- Location in Slovenia
- Coordinates: 46°37′57.3″N 15°47′6.28″E
- Country: Slovenia
- Traditional region: Styria
- Statistical region: Drava
- Municipality: Sveti Jurij v Slovenskih Goricah

Area
  - Total: 2.29 km^{2} (0.88 sq mi)
- Elevation: 337.7 m (1,108 ft)

Population (2002)
  - Total: 118

Zgornji Gasteraj (pronounced [ˈzɡoːɾnji ɡastɛˈɾaːi̯]) is a settlement in the Municipality of Sveti Jurij v Slovenskih Goricah in northeastern Slovenia. The area is part of the traditional region of Styria. The municipality is now included in the Drava Statistical Region.

A small roadside chapel-shrine in the settlement dates to 1910.
