= Obrat =

- Location in Slovenia
- Coordinates: 46°35′20.06″N 15°53′21.72″E
- Country: Slovenia
- Traditional region: Styria
- Statistical region: Drava
- Municipality: Benedikt

Area
  - Total: 1.54 km^{2} (0.59 sq mi)
- Elevation: 251.4 m (825 ft)

Population (2020)
  - Total: 85
  - Density: 55/km^{2} (140/sq mi)

Obrat (pronounced [ˈoːbɾat]) is a settlement in the Municipality of Benedikt in northeastern Slovenia. It lies in the Slovene Hills (Slovene: Slovenske gorice) in the valley of Drvanja Creek. The area is part of the traditional region of Styria. It is now included in the Drava Statistical Region.

Traces of Roman-period buildings and a burial ground with burial mounds have been identified near the settlement.
