= Migolska Gora =

- Location in Slovenia
- Coordinates: 45°57′31.94″N 15°1′59.8″E
- Country: Slovenia
- Traditional region: Lower Carniola
- Statistical region: Southeast Slovenia
- Municipality: Mirna

Area
  - Total: 1.04 km^{2} (0.40 sq mi)
- Elevation: 410.4 m (1,346 ft)

Population (2002)
  - Total: 22

Migolska Gora (pronounced [ˈmiːɡɔu̯ska ˈɡɔːra]) is a small dispersed settlement in the hills in the Municipality of Mirna in southeastern Slovenia. The municipality is included in the Southeast Slovenia Statistical Region. The entire area is part of the traditional region of Lower Carniola.
