= Srednji Gasteraj =

- Location in Slovenia
- Coordinates: 46°37′19.84″N 15°47′38.17″E
- Country: Slovenia
- Traditional region: Styria
- Statistical region: Drava
- Municipality: Sveti Jurij v Slovenskih Goricah

Area
  - Total: 1.46 km^{2} (0.56 sq mi)
- Elevation: 329.3 m (1,080 ft)

Population (2002)
  - Total: 87

Srednji Gasteraj (pronounced [ˈsɾeːdnji ɡastɛˈɾaːi̯]) is a settlement in the Slovene Hills in northeastern Slovenia. It lies in the Municipality of Sveti Jurij v Slovenskih Goricah. The area is part of the traditional region of Styria. It is now included in the Drava Statistical Region.
