= Zagorica, Mirna =

Zagorica
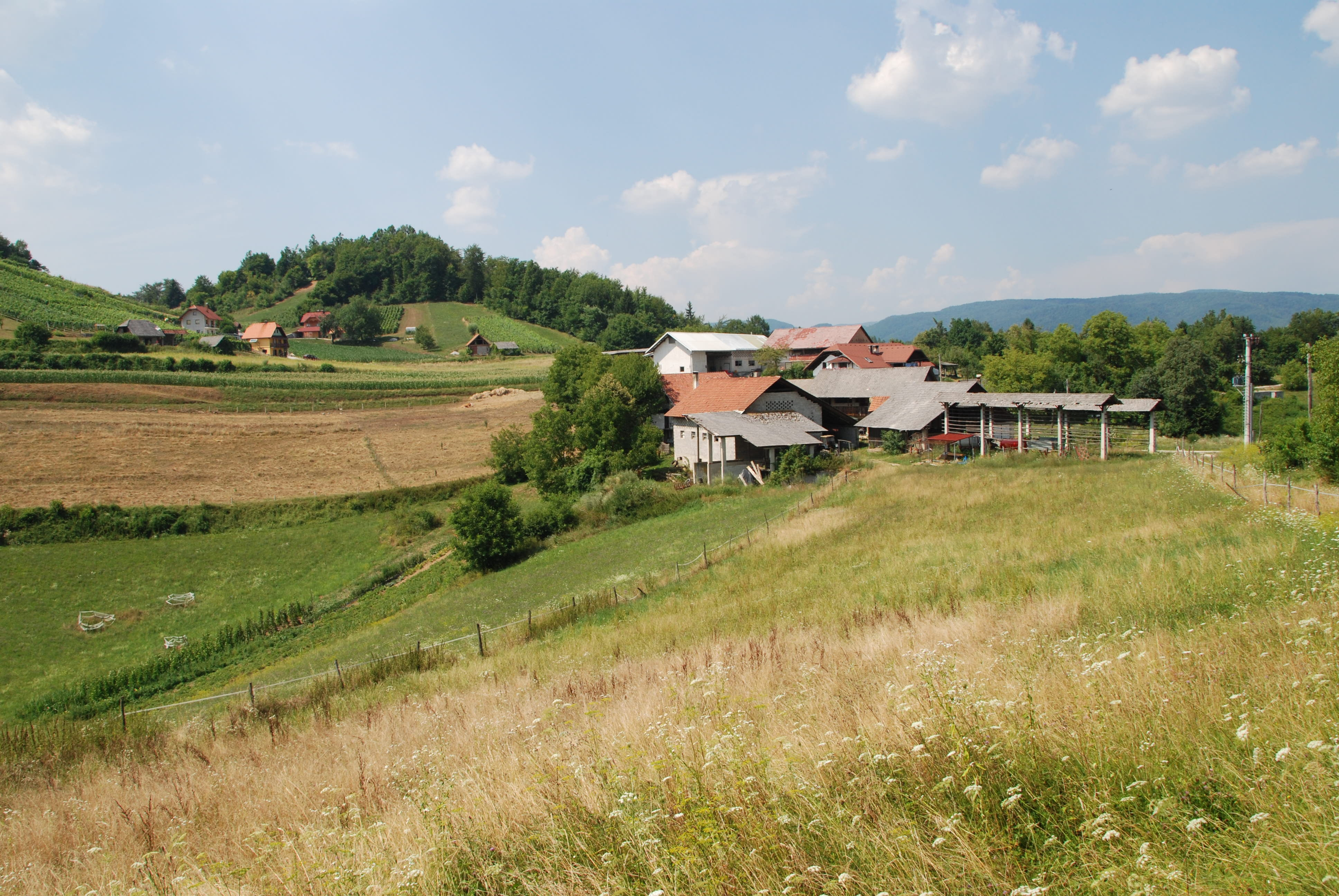

- Location in Slovenia
- Coordinates: 45°57′18.02″N 15°1′3.13″E
- Country: Slovenia
- Traditional region: Lower Carniola
- Statistical region: Southeast Slovenia
- Municipality: Mirna

Area
  - Total: 1.1 km^{2} (0.42 sq mi)
- Elevation: 376.1 m (1,234 ft)

Population (2002)
  - Total: 37

Zagorica (pronounced [ˈzaːɡɔɾitsa]) is a small settlement in the Municipality of Mirna in southeastern Slovenia. It lies in the hills west of Mirna. The municipality is included in the Southeast Slovenia Statistical Region. The entire area is part of the traditional region of Lower Carniola.

== Notable people ==
Notable people that were born or lived in Zagorica include:

- Lado Smrekar (born 1926), cultural worker
