= Spodnja Ročica =

- Location in Slovenia
- Coordinates: 46°37′14.99″N 15°51′21.39″E
- Country: Slovenia
- Traditional region: Styria
- Statistical region: Drava
- Municipality: Benedikt

Area
  - Total: 1.7 km^{2} (0.66 sq mi)
- Elevation: 308.9 m (1,013 ft)

Population (2020)
  - Total: 124
  - Density: 73/km^{2} (190/sq mi)

Spodnja Ročica (pronounced [ˈspoːdnja ɾɔˈtʃiːtsa]) is a settlement in the Municipality of Benedikt in northeastern Slovenia. It lies in the Slovene Hills (Slovene: Slovenske gorice). The area is part of the traditional region of Styria and is now included in the Drava Statistical Region.

Fourteen partly destroyed Roman-period burial mounds have been identified near the settlement.
