= Žitence =

- Location in Slovenia
- Coordinates: 46°38′25.56″N 15°47′42.43″E
- Country: Slovenia
- Traditional region: Styria
- Statistical region: Drava
- Municipality: Sveti Jurij v Slovenskih Goricah

Area
  - Total: 4.92 km^{2} (1.90 sq mi)
- Elevation: 327.2 m (1,073 ft)

Population (2002)
  - Total: 275

Žitence (pronounced [ˈʒiːtəntsɛ]) is a settlement in the Municipality of Sveti Jurij v Slovenskih Goricah in northeastern Slovenia. It lies in the upper part of the valley of Velka Creek, a left tributary of the Pesnica River in the Slovene Hills. The area is part of the traditional region of Styria. The municipality is now included in the Drava Statistical Region.
