= Brezovica pri Mirni =

- Location in Slovenia
- Coordinates: 45°56′9.33″N 15°2′28.07″E
- Country: Slovenia
- Traditional region: Lower Carniola
- Statistical region: Southeast Slovenia
- Municipality: Mirna

Area
  - Total: 1.9 km^{2} (0.73 sq mi)
- Elevation: 290.3 m (952 ft)

Population (2002)
  - Total: 117

Brezovica pri Mirni (pronounced [ˈbɾéːzɔʋitsa pɾi ˈmìːɾni, - ˈmíː-]) is a small settlement in the Municipality of Mirna in southeastern Slovenia. The area is part of the traditional region of Lower Carniola. The municipality is now included in the Southeast Slovenia Statistical Region.

== Name ==
The name of the settlement was changed from Brezovica to Brezovica pri Mirni in 1953.
