= Ločki Vrh, Benedikt =

Ločki Vrh
- Location in Slovenia
- Coordinates: 46°35′48.03″N 15°55′8.84″E
- Country: Slovenia
- Traditional region: Styria
- Statistical region: Drava
- Municipality: Benedikt

Area
  - Total: 1.38 km^{2} (0.53 sq mi)
- Elevation: 298.4 m (979 ft)

Population (2020)
  - Total: 87
  - Density: 63/km^{2} (160/sq mi)

Ločki Vrh (pronounced [ˈloːtʃki ˈʋəɾx]) is a small settlement in the Slovene Hills (Slovene: Slovenske gorice) in the Municipality of Benedikt in northeastern Slovenia. The area is part of the traditional region of Styria and is now included in the Drava Statistical Region.

An intact Roman-period burial mound in a forest near the settlement has so far not been excavated.
