= Šmaver, Trebnje =

Šmaver
- Location in Slovenia
- Coordinates: 45°52′13.21″N 15°1′21.58″E
- Country: Slovenia
- Traditional region: Lower Carniola
- Statistical region: Southeast Slovenia
- Municipality: Trebnje

Area
  - Total: 0.82 km^{2} (0.32 sq mi)
- Elevation: 322.6 m (1,058 ft)

Population (2002)
  - Total: 40

Šmaver (pronounced [ˈʃmaːʋəɾ]) is a small village in the Municipality of Trebnje in eastern Slovenia. The area is part of the historical region of Lower Carniola. The municipality is now included in the Southeast Slovenia Statistical Region.

There are two churches in the area. The settlement gets its name from a 16th-century church dedicated to Saint Maurice (Slovene: sveti Mavricij, colloquially known as Šmaver). A second church is dedicated to Saint Anne and was a pilgrimage church built in the early 18th century.
