= Fabrizio Cerina =

Italian banker

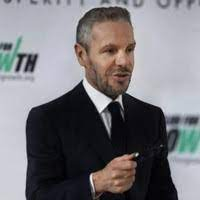
- Occupation: Investment banker
- Years active: 1995 – present
- Title: Crédit des Alpes Group, Chairman

Fabrizio Cerina (born in Piacenza, Italy) is the chairman of international investment banking group Crédit des Alpes.

== Career ==
Cerina began his career by acquiring a 34% stake in Banque de Participations et de Placements, Geneva. He later sold it to Lebanese buyer Al-Mashreg Bank.

He spent the majority of his career in Geneva (CH) and London (GB). In 1982 he acquired Attel Bank, in which he invested CHF1.5 million (US$1.53 million), eventually listing the holding company on the Luxembourg Stock Exchange in 1987 at a value of approximately CHF130 million (US$132.6 million).

In the 1990s Cerina was dubbed "a banker and a gentleman" by Swiss and international press when, as the controlling shareholder of Attel Bank, he voluntarily refunded clients out of his own pocket after a rogue trader caused losses amounting to CHF45 million (US$46 million). The trader stole money from clients, as well as dealing in unauthorized junk bonds and NASDAQ securities.

Cerina merged and developed the business into Crédit des Alpes, an investment bank that advises on large international transactions. The bank put together the US$4.2 billion acquisition by Vivendi (VIV:FP) of Brazilian broadband market-leader company GVT in 2009 — then the largest world's telecoms deal.
