= Cirnik, Mirna =

Cirnik
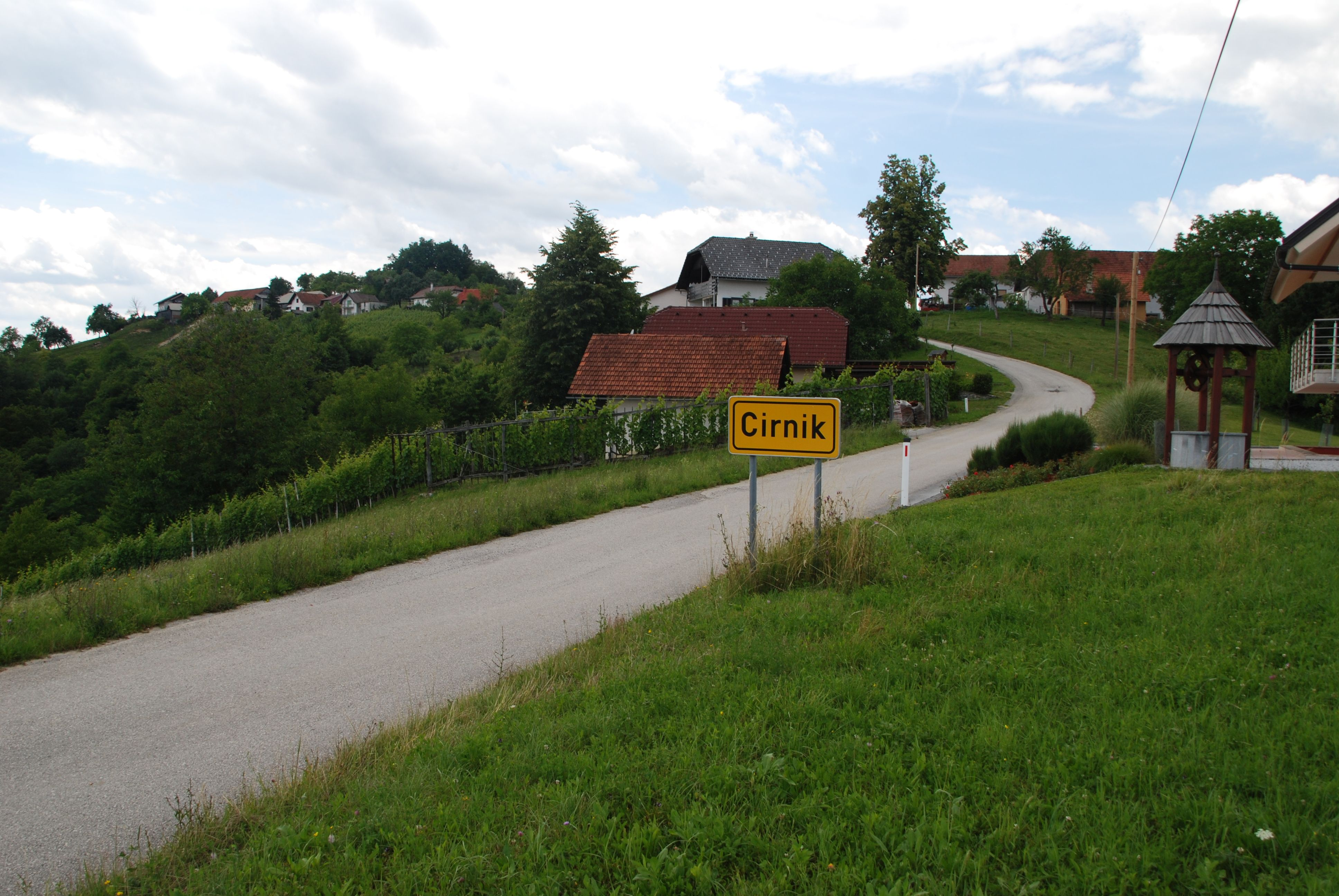

- Location in Slovenia
- Coordinates: 45°57′45.56″N 15°0′36.67″E
- Country: Slovenia
- Traditional region: Lower Carniola
- Statistical region: Southeast Slovenia
- Municipality: Mirna

Area
  - Total: 0.21 km^{2} (0.081 sq mi)
- Elevation: 423 m (1,388 ft)

Population (2002)
  - Total: 29

Cirnik (pronounced [ˈtsiːɾnik]) is a small settlement in hills in the Municipality of Mirna in southeastern Slovenia. The municipality is included in the Southeast Slovenia Statistical Region. The entire area is part of the traditional Lower Carniola region.
