= Ševnica =

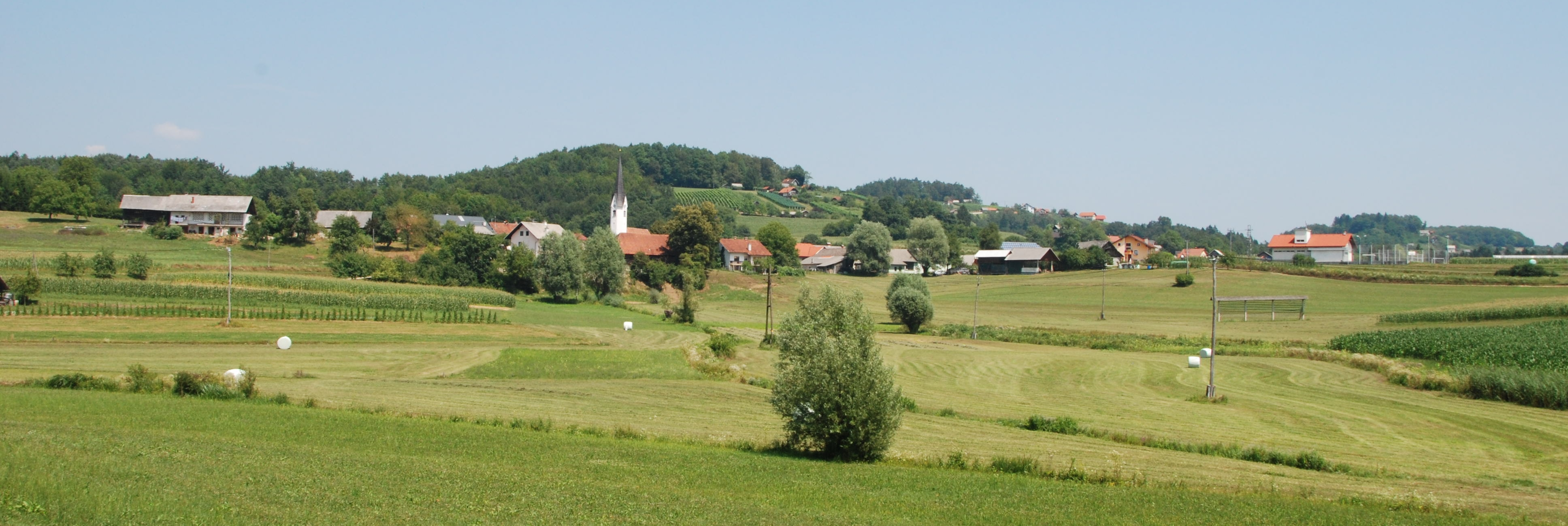

- Location in Slovenia
- Coordinates: 45°56′50.15″N 15°1′44.45″E
- Country: Slovenia
- Traditional region: Lower Carniola
- Statistical region: Southeast Slovenia
- Municipality: Mirna

Area
  - Total: 0.90 km^{2} (0.35 sq mi)
- Elevation: 296.5 m (973 ft)

Population (2002)
  - Total: 56

Ševnica (pronounced [ˈʃeːu̯nitsa]) is a small village west of Mirna in the Municipality of Mirna in southeastern Slovenia. The area is part of the traditional region of Lower Carniola. The municipality is now included in the Southeast Slovenia Statistical Region.

The local church is dedicated to the Virgin Mary and belongs to the parish of Mirna. It was originally dedicated to Saint Martin and preserves fragments of wall paintings dating to around 1500. It was greatly changed in the 18th and 19th centuries.
