= Škrjanče, Mirna =

Škrjanče
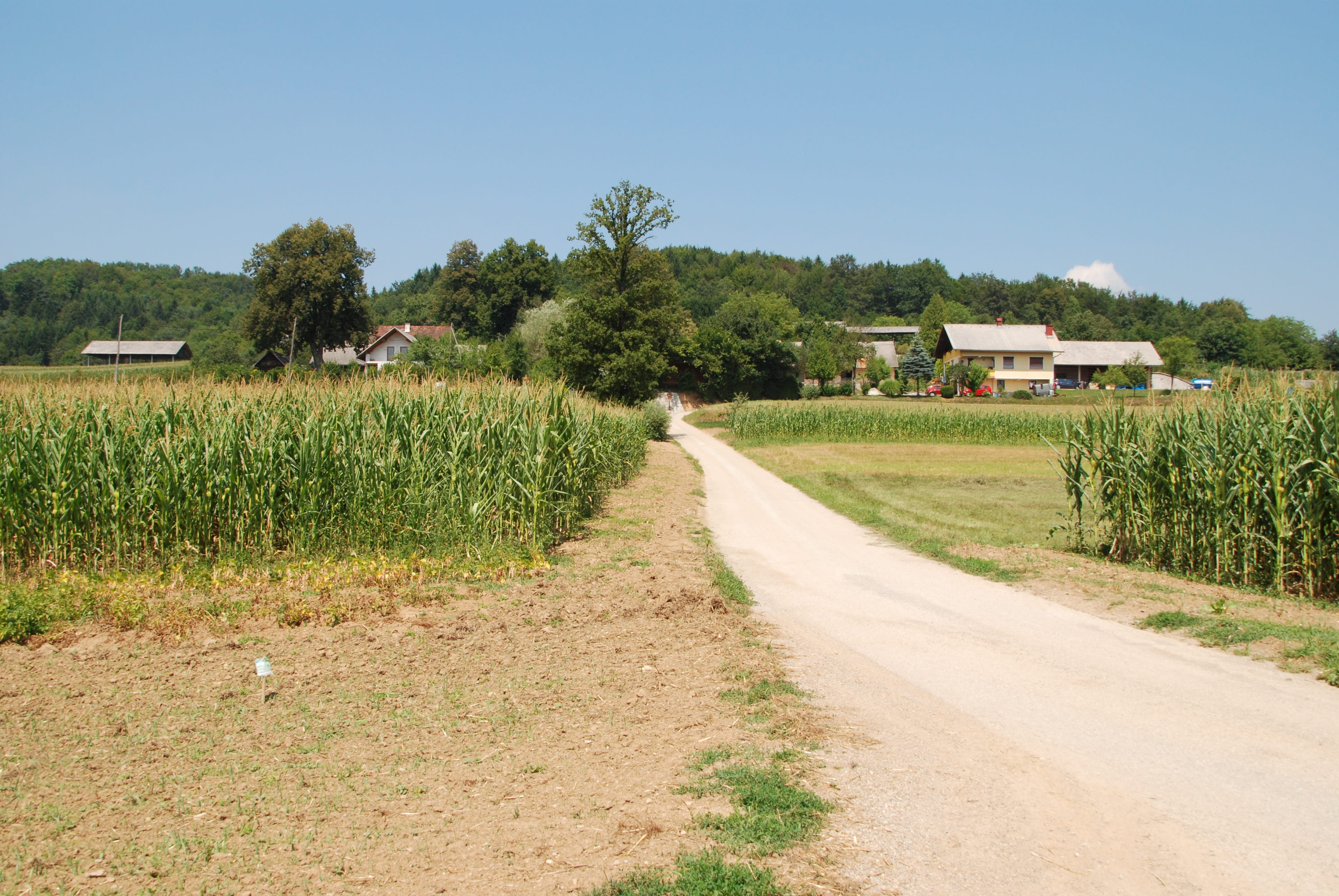

- Location in Slovenia
- Coordinates: 45°56′40.12″N 15°1′14.26″E
- Country: Slovenia
- Traditional region: Lower Carniola
- Statistical region: Southeast Slovenia
- Municipality: Mirna

Area
  - Total: 0.7 km^{2} (0.27 sq mi)
- Elevation: 301.4 m (989 ft)

Population (2002)
  - Total: 28

Škrjanče (pronounced [ʃkəˈɾjaːntʃɛ]) is a small settlement in the Municipality of Mirna in southeastern Slovenia. It lies west of Mirna in the traditional region of Lower Carniola. The area is now included in the Southeast Slovenia Statistical Region.
