= Škrjanče, Ivančna Gorica =

Škrjanče
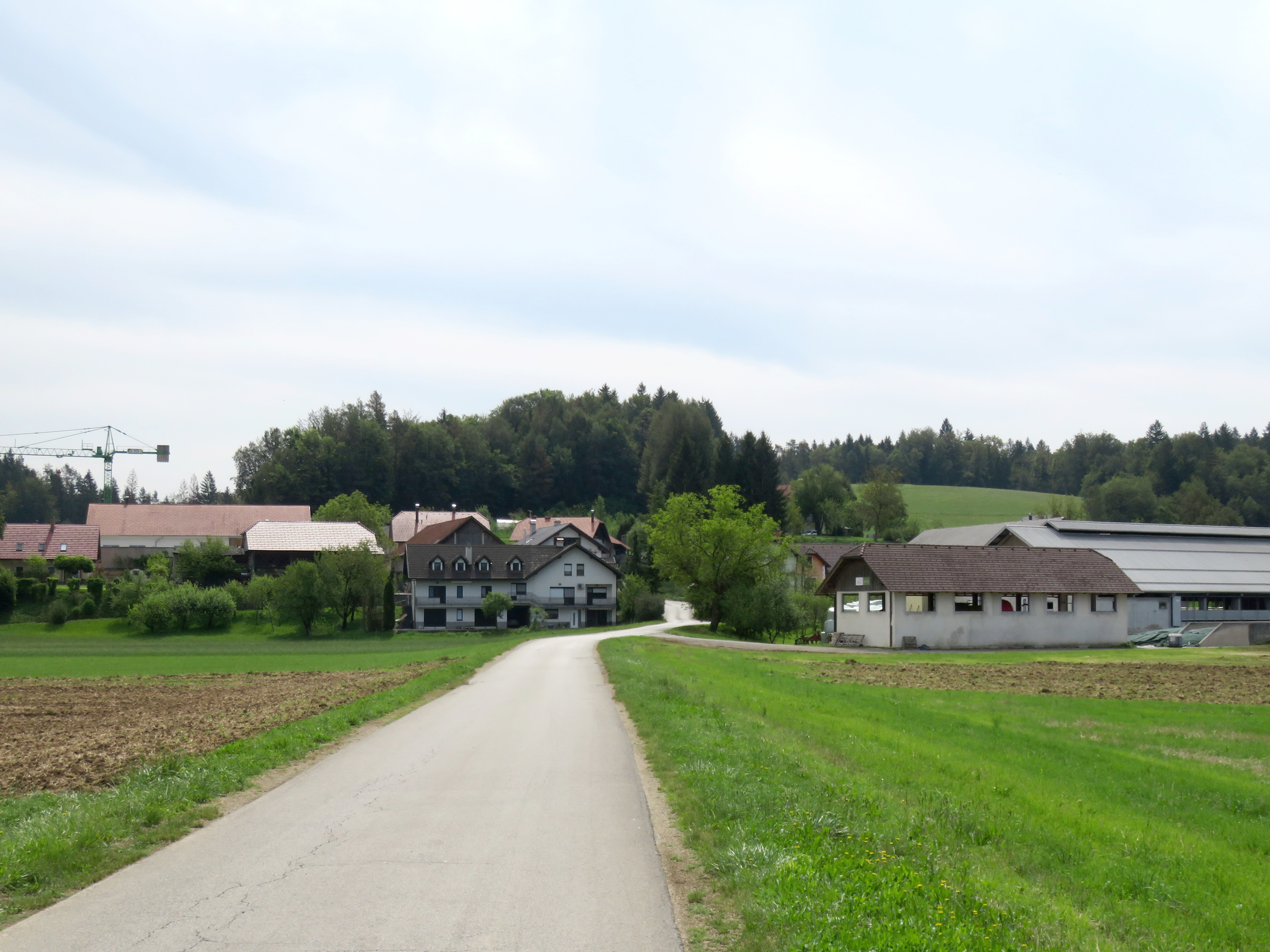

- Location in Slovenia
- Coordinates: 45°55′41.91″N 14°48′32.97″E
- Country: Slovenia
- Traditional region: Lower Carniola
- Statistical region: Central Slovenia
- Municipality: Ivančna Gorica

Area
  - Total: 0.67 km^{2} (0.26 sq mi)
- Elevation: 327.6 m (1,075 ft)

Škrjanče (pronounced [ʃkəɾˈjaːntʃɛ]; in older sources also Škrjance, German: Lerchenfeld) is a small settlement just south of Ivančna Gorica in traditional region of Lower Carniola in central Slovenia. The Municipality of Ivančna Gorica is included in the Central Slovenia Statistical Region.
