= Škovec, Trebnje =

Škovec
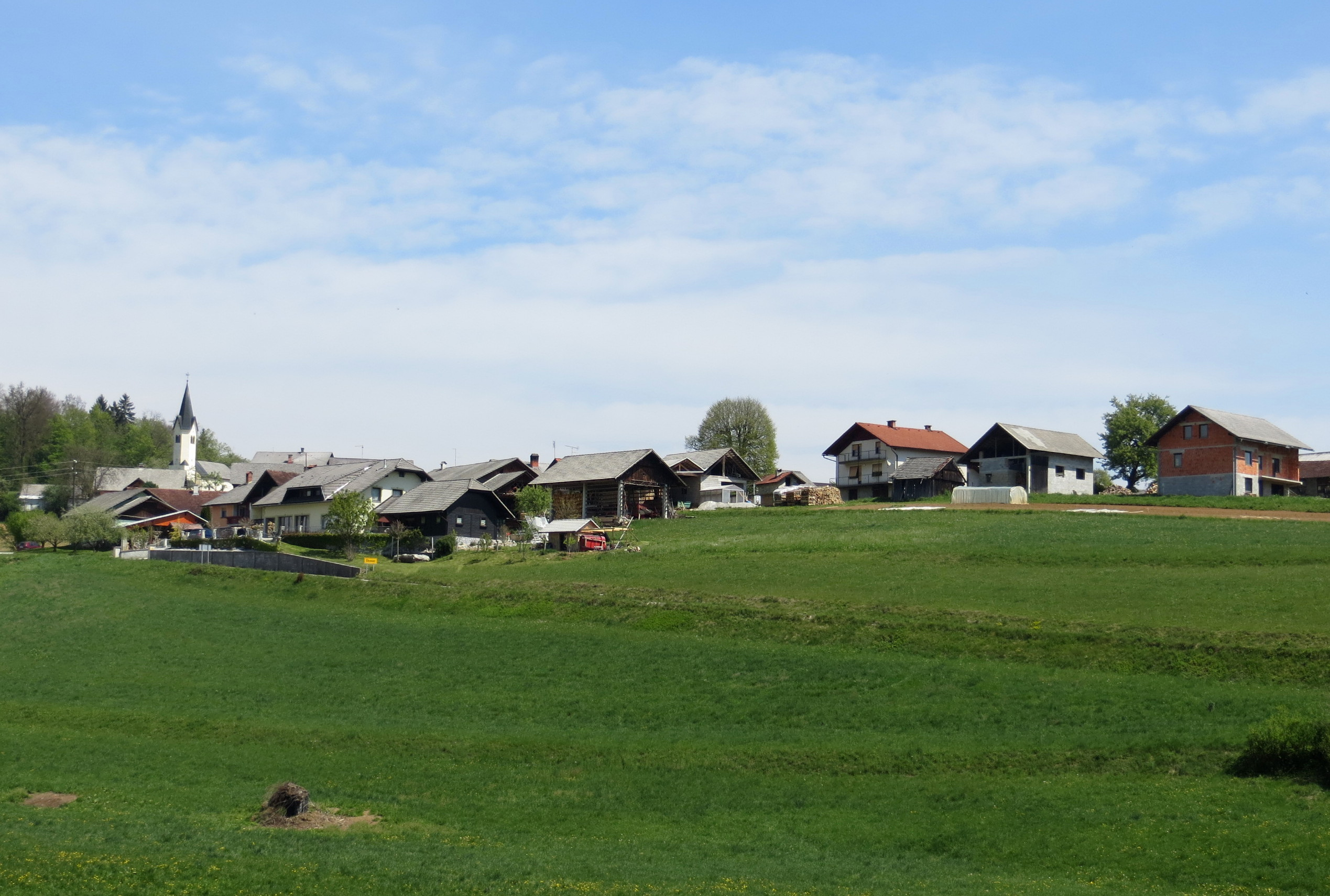

- Location in Slovenia
- Coordinates: 45°56′28.13″N 14°58′27.11″E
- Country: Slovenia
- Traditional region: Lower Carniola
- Statistical region: Southeast Slovenia
- Municipality: Trebnje

Area
  - Total: 1.18 km^{2} (0.46 sq mi)
- Elevation: 311.5 m (1,022 ft)

Population (2002)
  - Total: 88

Škovec (pronounced [ˈʃkɔːʋəts] or [ˈʃkoːʋəts]) is a small village in the Municipality of Trebnje in eastern Slovenia. It lies just off the main road leading west out of Trebnje to Šentlovrenc. The area is part of the historical region of Lower Carniola. The municipality is now included in the Southeast Slovenia Statistical Region.

== Church ==
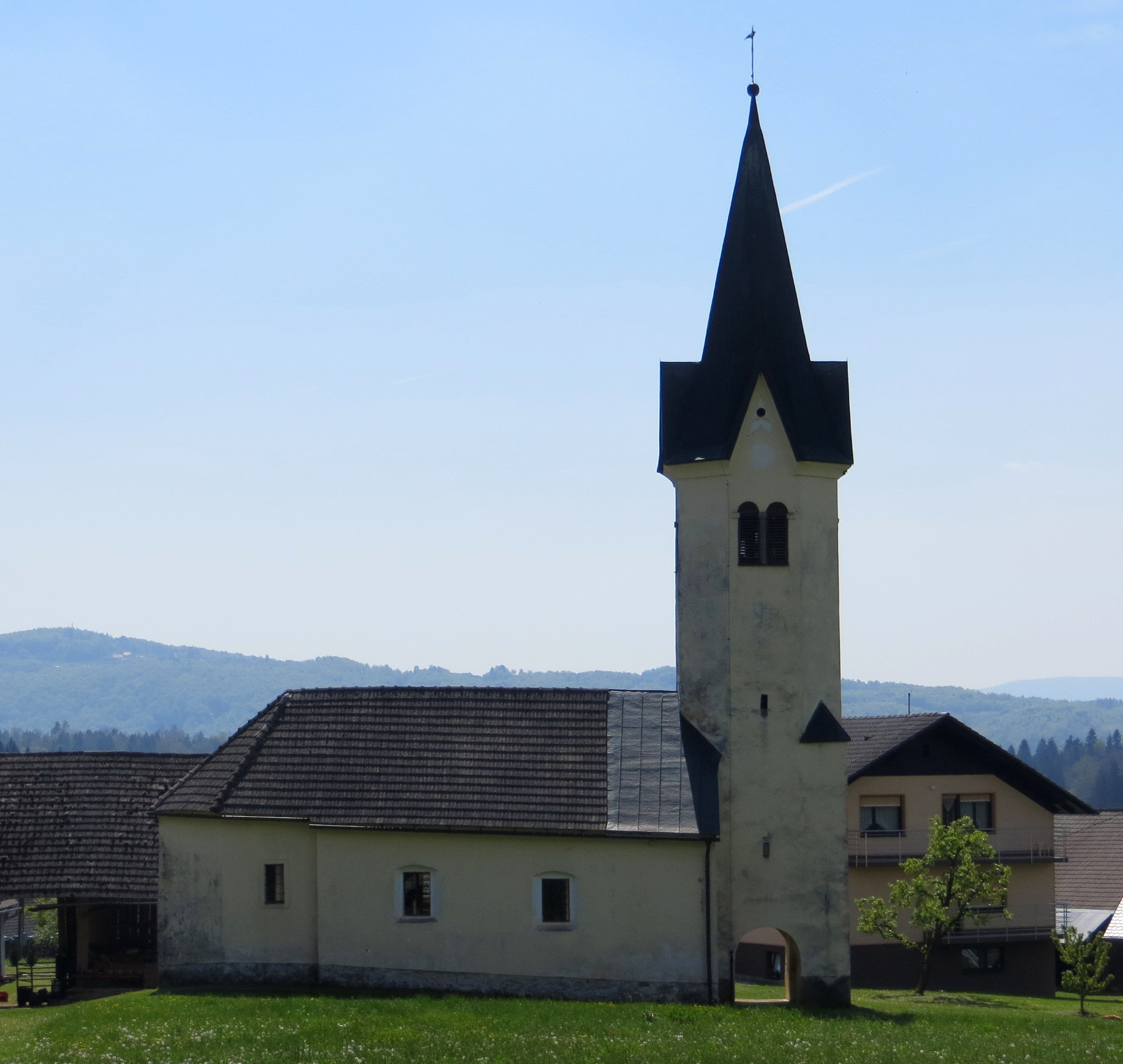
Saint Gertrude's Church

The local church is dedicated to Saint Gertrude (Slovene: sveta Jedrt) and belongs to the Parish of Trebnje. It was first mentioned in written documents dating to 1581. The belfry bears the date 1782.
