= Municipality of Benedikt =

Municipality of Slovenia

Municipality of Benedikt Občina Benedikt
- Municipality
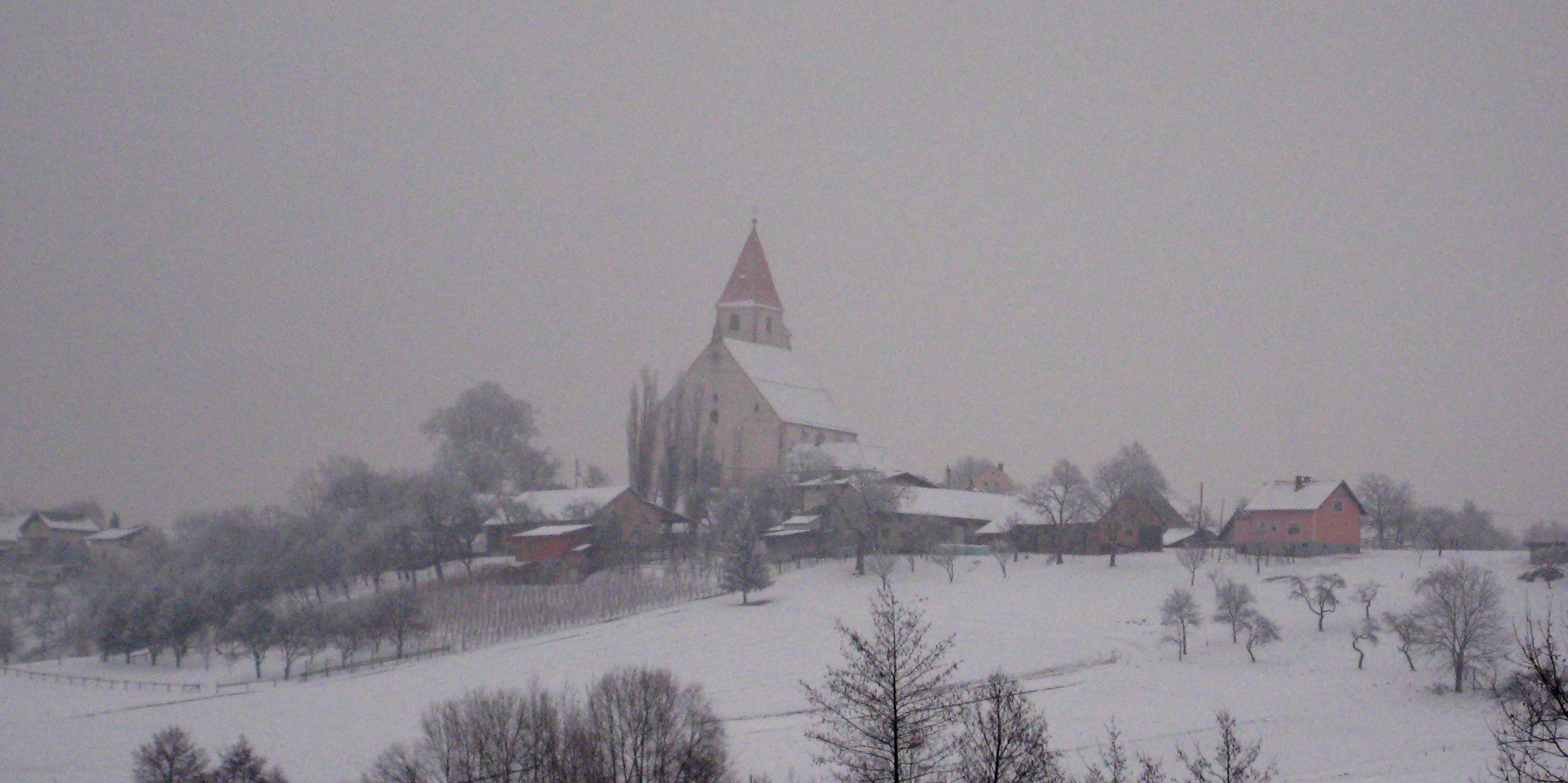

- Location of the Municipality of Benedikt in Slovenia
- Coordinates: 46°36′19″N 15°53′30″E
- Country: Slovenia

Government
  - Mayor: Milan Gumzar (LDS)

Area
  - Total: 24.1 km^{2} (9.3 sq mi)

Population (2012)
  - Total: 2,432
  - Density: 101/km^{2} (261/sq mi)
- Time zone: UTC+01 (CET)
  - Summer (DST): UTC+02 (CEST)
- Postal code: 2234
- Vehicle registration: MB
- Website: www.benedikt.si

The Municipality of Benedikt (pronounced [bɛnɛˈdiːkt]; Slovene: Občina Benedikt) is a municipality in northeastern Slovenia. Its seat is the settlement of Benedikt. Before 1 January 1999 it was part of the Municipality of Lenart. It lies in the Slovene Hills (Slovene: Slovenske gorice). The area is part of the traditional region of Styria. It is now included in the Drava Statistical Region.

== Settlements ==
In addition to the municipal seat of Benedikt, the municipality also includes the following settlements:

- Drvanja
- Ihova
- Ločki Vrh
- Negovski Vrh
- Obrat
- Spodnja Bačkova
- Spodnja Ročica
- Štajngrova
- Stara Gora
- Sveti Trije Kralji v Slovenskih Goricah
- Trotkova
- Trstenik
