= Trotkova =

- Location in Slovenia
- Coordinates: 46°35′56.22″N 15°54′16.82″E
- Country: Slovenia
- Traditional region: Styria
- Statistical region: Drava
- Municipality: Benedikt

Area
  - Total: 1.59 km^{2} (0.61 sq mi)
- Elevation: 242.2 m (795 ft)

Population (2020)
  - Total: 106
  - Density: 66.7/km^{2} (173/sq mi)

Trotkova (pronounced [ˈtɾoːtkɔʋa]) is a settlement in the Municipality of Benedikt in northeastern Slovenia. It lies in the Slovene Hills (Slovene: Slovenske gorice). The area is part of the traditional region of Styria. It is now included in the Drava Statistical Region.

An extensive Roman-period burial ground with sixty burial mounds has been identified near the settlement.
