= Municipality of Mirna =

Municipality of Slovenia

Municipality of Mirna Občina Mirna
- Municipality
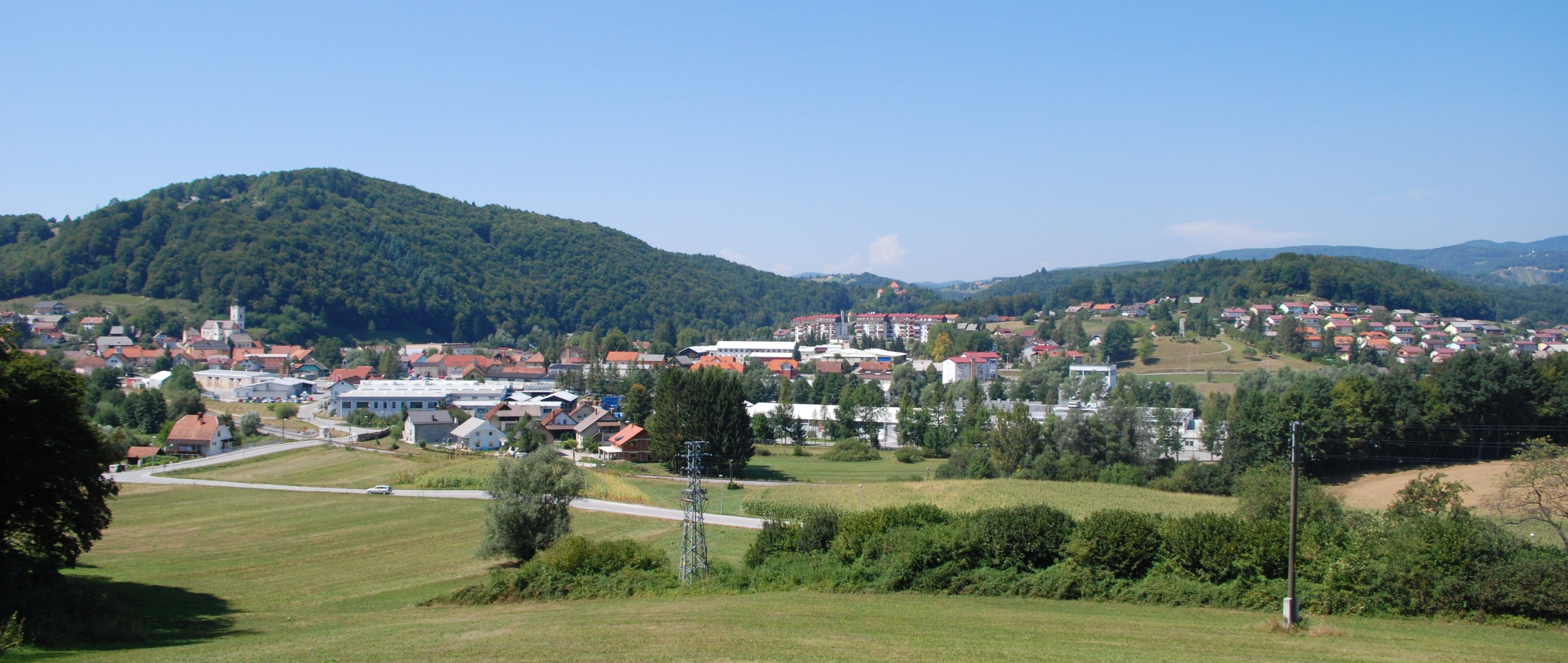

- Location of the Municipality of Mirna in Slovenia
- Coordinates: 45°57′N 15°03′E
- Country: Slovenia

Government
  - Mayor: Dušan Skerbiš (Independent)

Area
  - Total: 31.3 km^{2} (12.1 sq mi)

Population (July 1, 2018)
  - Total: 2,588
  - Density: 82.7/km^{2} (214/sq mi)
- Time zone: UTC+01 (CET)
  - Summer (DST): UTC+02 (CEST)
- Website: www.mirna.si

The Municipality of Mirna (Slovene: Občina Mirna) is a municipality in the traditional region of Lower Carniola in southeastern Slovenia. The seat of the municipality is the town of Mirna. Mirna became a municipality in 2011.

== Settlements ==
In addition to the municipal seat of Mirna, the municipality also includes the following settlements:

- Brezovica pri Mirni
- Cirnik
- Debenec
- Glinek
- Gomila
- Gorenja Vas pri Mirni
- Migolica
- Migolska Gora
- Praprotnica
- Ravne
- Sajenice
- Selo pri Mirni
- Selska Gora
- Ševnica
- Škrjanče
- Stan
- Stara Gora
- Trbinc
- Volčje Njive
- Zabrdje
- Zagorica

== History ==
Mirna was a municipality before World War II. After the war, it was a municipality from the establishment of municipalities in Slovenia in 1952 until 1959, when the Municipality of Mirna merged with the Municipality of Trebnje.

In November 2009, residents of the parish of Mirna voted in a referendum in support of secession from the Municipality of Trebnje and the establishment of an independent municipality, but the act enacting this was rejected in April 2010 by the National Assembly, mainly because it also included the establishment of the Municipality of Ankaran.

On February 1, 2011, the National Assembly passed another act on the establishment of the Municipality of Mirna. That happened after the Constitutional Court of Slovenia had ordered the National Assembly in December 2010 to establish the Municipality of Mirna within two months and to call the election to its municipal council within 20 days after the establishment. Mirna regained its status as a municipality on February 26, 2011.
