= Škoflje, Ivančna Gorica =

Škoflje
- Location in Slovenia
- Coordinates: 45°56′17.86″N 14°52′26.38″E
- Country: Slovenia
- Traditional region: Lower Carniola
- Statistical region: Central Slovenia
- Municipality: Ivančna Gorica

Area
  - Total: 0.83 km^{2} (0.32 sq mi)
- Elevation: 325.3 m (1,067 ft)

Population (2002)
  - Total: 47

Škoflje (pronounced [ˈʃkoːfljɛ]) is a small settlement to the southeast of Šentvid pri Stični in the Municipality of Ivančna Gorica in central Slovenia. The area is part of the historical region of Lower Carniola. The municipality is now included in the Central Slovenia Statistical Region.
