= Cirkuše, Litija =

Cirkuše
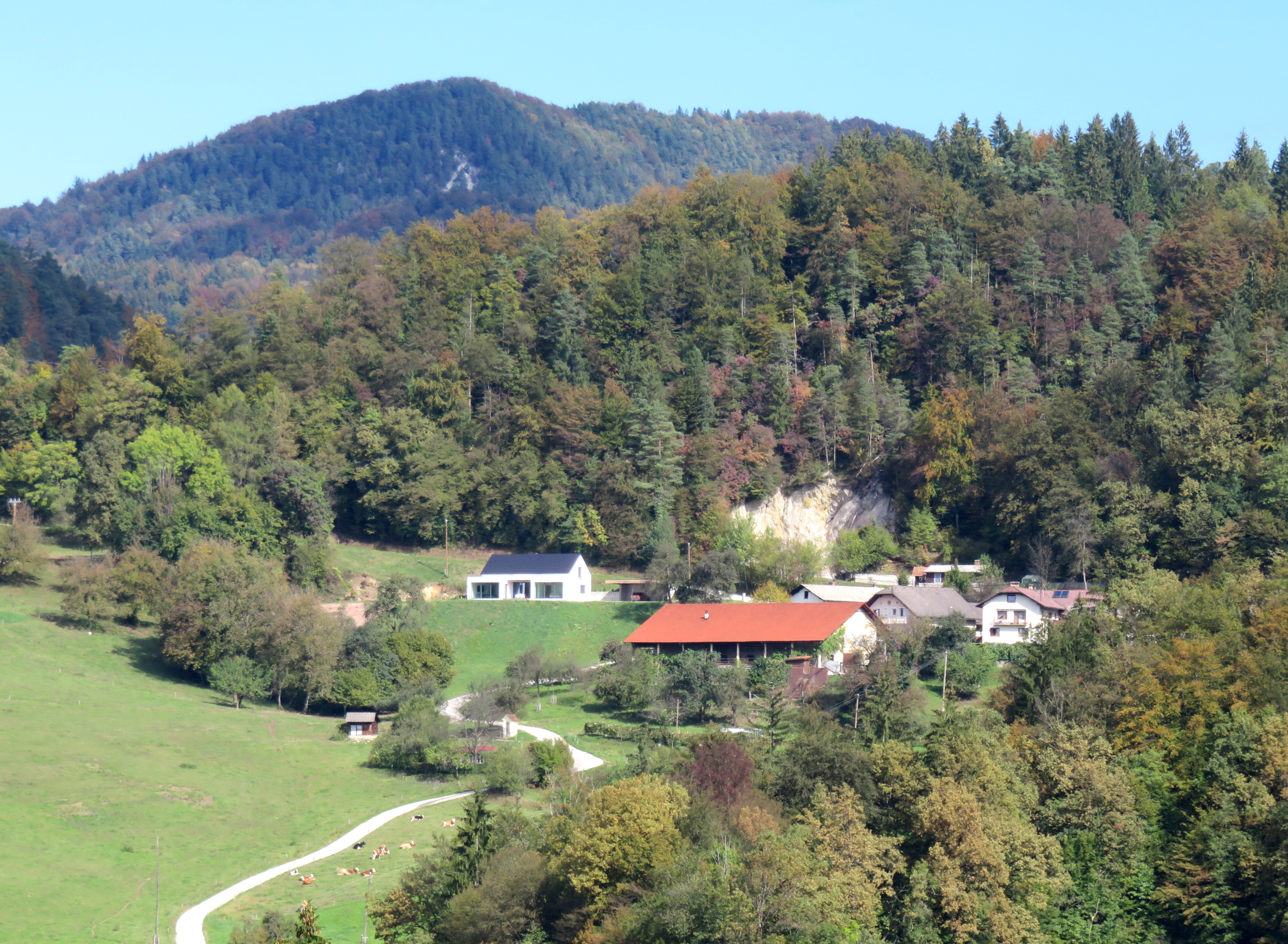

- Location in Slovenia
- Coordinates: 46°6′1.84″N 14°51′47.35″E
- Country: Slovenia
- Traditional region: Upper Carniola
- Statistical region: Central Sava
- Municipality: Litija

Area
  - Total: 2.4 km^{2} (0.93 sq mi)
- Elevation: 379 m (1,243 ft)

Population (2002)
  - Total: 30
- Postal code: 1252

Cirkuše (pronounced [ˈtsiːɾkuʃɛ]; in older sources also Cerkovišče, German: Zirkušče) is a small settlement south of Vače in the Municipality of Litija in central Slovenia. The area is part of the traditional region of Upper Carniola. It is now included with the rest of the municipality in the Central Sava Statistical Region; until January 2014 the municipality was part of the Central Slovenia Statistical Region.
