= Zabrdje, Mirna =

Zabrdje
- Location in Slovenia
- Coordinates: 45°56′31.63″N 15°3′56.3″E
- Country: Slovenia
- Traditional region: Lower Carniola
- Statistical region: Southeast Slovenia
- Municipality: Mirna

Area
  - Total: 0.97 km^{2} (0.37 sq mi)
- Elevation: 265.2 m (870 ft)

Population (2002)
  - Total: 143

Zabrdje (pronounced [zaˈbəɾdjɛ]) is a settlement south of Mirna in the Municipality of Mirna in southeastern Slovenia. Traditionally, the area is part of Lower Carniola. The municipality is now included in the Southeast Slovenia Statistical Region.

Grič Mansion, built in the 15th century, stood in Zabrdje. It was burned in World War II. Today, a house stands at the site.
