= Cerina, Brežice =

Cerina
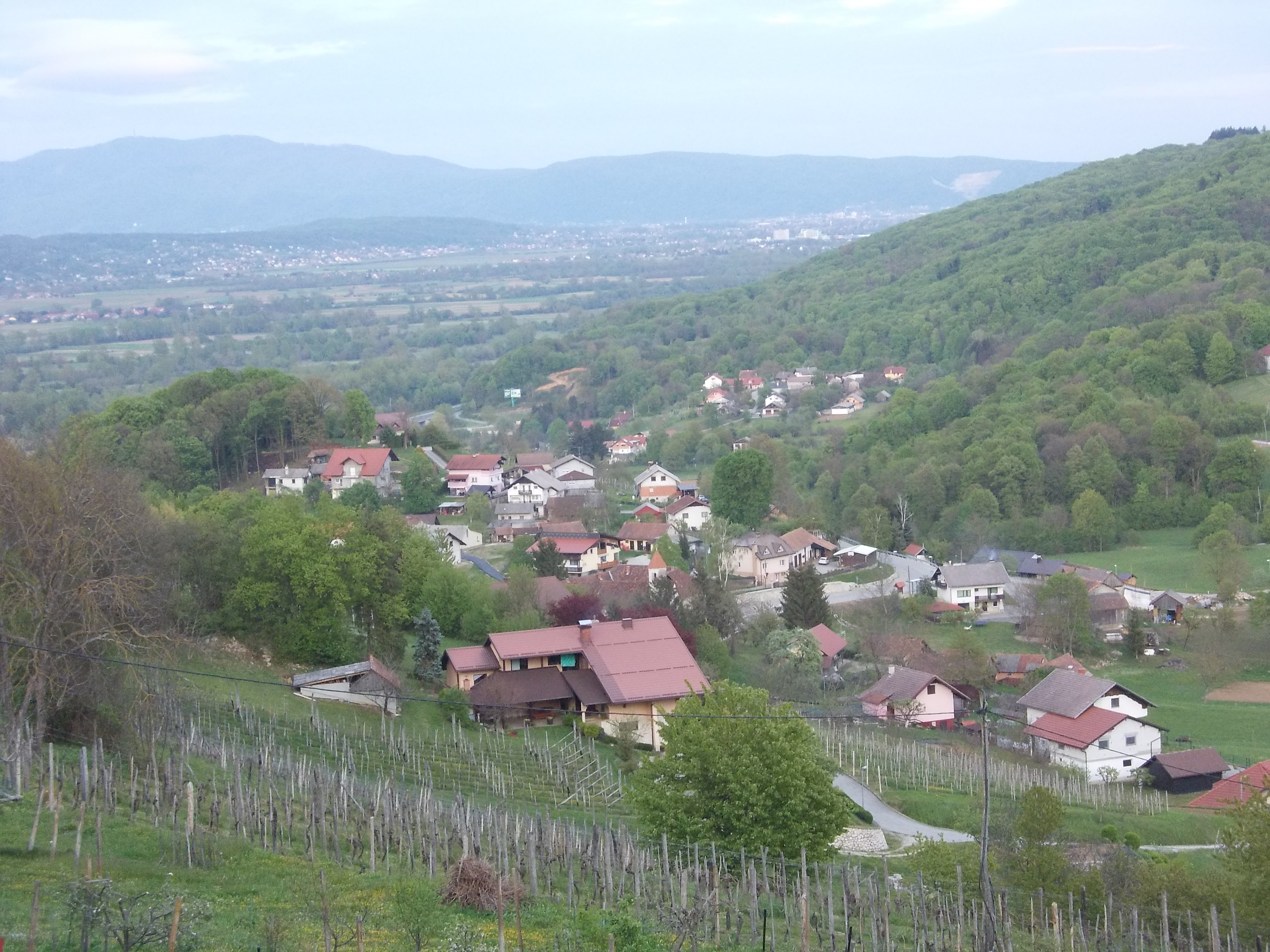
- Cerina, Brežice

- Location in Slovenia
- Coordinates: 45°52′43.33″N 15°36′26.2″E
- Country: Slovenia
- Traditional region: Lower Carniola
- Statistical region: Lower Sava
- Municipality: Brežice

Area
  - Total: 1.13 km^{2} (0.44 sq mi)
- Elevation: 223.9 m (735 ft)

Population (2020)
  - Total: 158
  - Density: 140/km^{2} (362/sq mi)

Cerina (pronounced [tsɛˈɾiːna]; German: Zerina) is a settlement south of Čatež ob Savi in the Municipality of Brežice in eastern Slovenia. The area is part of the traditional region of Lower Carniola. It is now included with the rest of the municipality in the Lower Sava Statistical Region.

A 17th-century mansion in the settlement was originally the estate of the Kostanjevica Monastery. Three sides around the central courtyard are living quarters and the fourth side is closed off with a chapel dedicated to Saint Michael.
