= Benedikt, Benedikt =

Benedikt Sveti Benedikt v Slovenskih Goricah (until 1952), Benedikt v Slovenskih Goricah (until 2003)
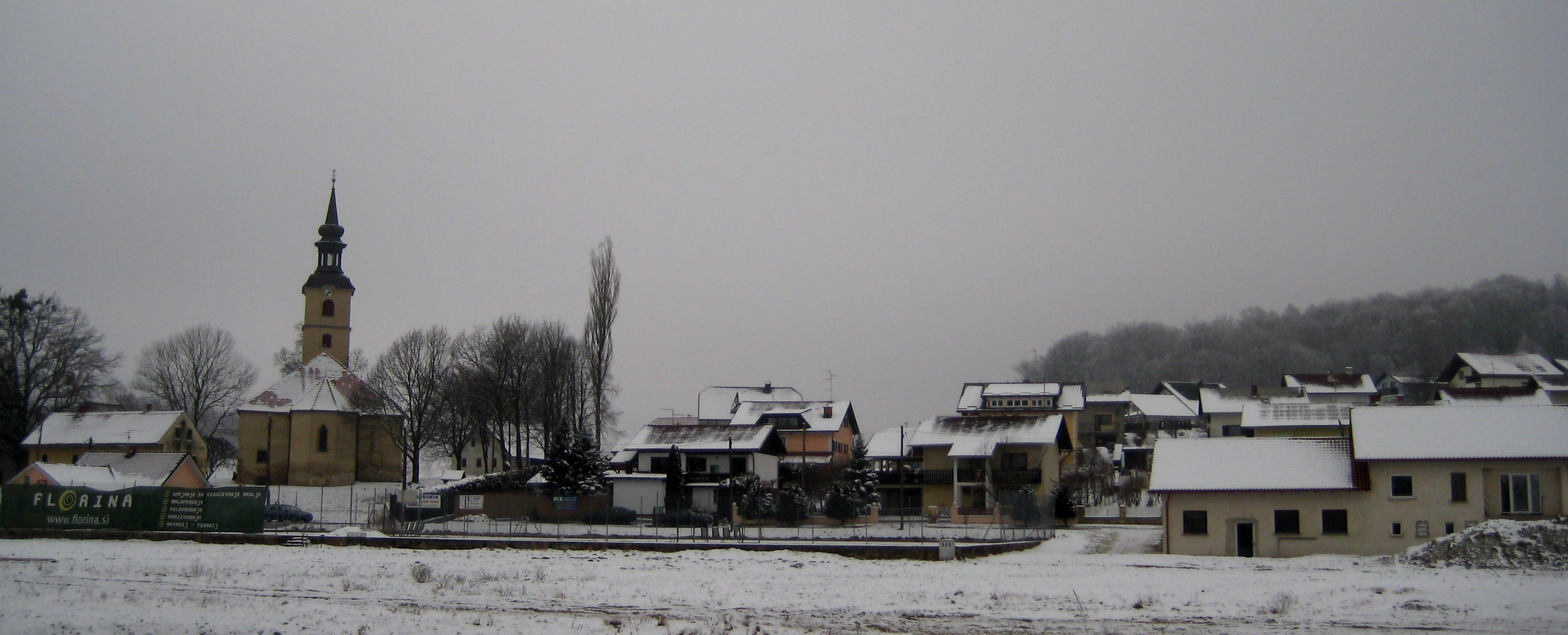

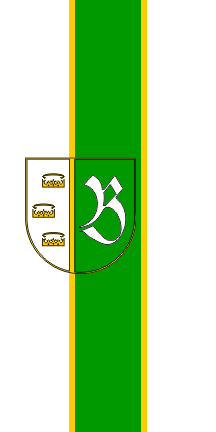
- Flag

- Location of Benedikt in Slovenia
- Coordinates: 46°36′23.23″N 15°53′2.99″E
- Country: Slovenia
- Traditional region: Styria
- Statistical region: Drava
- Municipality: Benedikt

Government
  - Mayor: Milan Gumzar (LDS)

Area
  - Total: 5.971 km^{2} (2.305 sq mi)
- Elevation: 253 m (830 ft)

Population (2016)
  - Total: 1,078
  - Density: 181/km^{2} (470/sq mi)
- Time zone: UTC+1 (CET)
  - Summer (DST): UTC+2 (CEST)
- Postal code: 2234
- Area code: 02
- Website: https://www.benedikt.si/

Benedikt (pronounced [bɛnɛˈdiːkt]) is the central settlement in the Municipality of Benedikt in northeastern Slovenia. Before 1998, it was part of the Municipality of Lenart. It lies in the Slovene Hills (Slovene: Slovenske gorice). The area is part of the traditional region of Styria. It is now included in the Drava Statistical Region.

== Name ==
The name of the settlement was changed from Sveti Benedikt v Slovenskih Goricah (Slovene: Sveti Benedikt v Slovenskih goricah; literally, 'Saint Benedict in the Slovene Hills') to Benedikt v Slovenskih Goricah (Benedikt v Slovenskih goricah; literally, 'Benedict in the Slovene Hills') in 1952. The name was changed on the basis of the 1948 Law on Names of Settlements and Designations of Squares, Streets, and Buildings as part of efforts by Slovenia's postwar communist government to remove religious elements from toponyms. In 2003, it was changed simply to Benedikt.

== Church ==
The local parish church from which the village gets its name is dedicated to Saint Benedict and belongs to the Roman Catholic Archdiocese of Maribor. It is originally a Gothic church dating to the second quarter of the 14th century. It was extensively rebuilt in the 18th and 19th centuries.
