= Novinci =

- Location in Slovenia
- Coordinates: 46°31′46.52″N 15°57′33.99″E
- Country: Slovenia
- Traditional region: Styria
- Statistical region: Drava
- Municipality: Sveti Andraž v Slovenskih Goricah

Area
  - Total: 3.18 km^{2} (1.23 sq mi)
- Elevation: 240.7 m (790 ft)

Population (2002)
  - Total: 189

Novinci (pronounced [nɔˈʋiːntsi]) is a settlement in the Municipality of Sveti Andraž v Slovenskih Goricah in northeastern Slovenia. It lies in the Slovene Hills in the traditional region of Styria. The municipality is now included in the Drava Statistical Region.

== History ==
Novinci became a separate settlement in 1974, when it was administratively separated from parts of Andrenci, Župetinci, and Smolinci.
