= Slatina pri Dobjem =

- Location in Slovenia
- Coordinates: 46°8′24.42″N 15°25′17.18″E
- Country: Slovenia
- Traditional region: Styria
- Statistical region: Savinja
- Municipality: Dobje

Area
  - Total: 0.74 km^{2} (0.29 sq mi)
- Elevation: 569.7 m (1,869 ft)

Population (2020)
  - Total: 51
  - Density: 69/km^{2} (180/sq mi)
- Postal code: 3224

Slatina pri Dobjem (pronounced [ˈslaːtina pɾi ˈdoːbjɛm]) is a small settlement east of Dobje pri Planini in the Municipality of Dobje in eastern Slovenia. The area is part of the traditional region of Styria and is now included with the rest of the municipality in the Savinja Statistical Region.

== Name ==
The name of the settlement was changed from Slatina to Slatina pri Dobjem in 1953.
