= Večje Brdo =

- Location in Slovenia
- Coordinates: 46°7′21.69″N 15°23′14.19″E
- Country: Slovenia
- Traditional region: Styria
- Statistical region: Savinja
- Municipality: Dobje

Area
  - Total: 0.89 km^{2} (0.34 sq mi)
- Elevation: 478 m (1,568 ft)

Population (2020)
  - Total: 63
  - Density: 71/km^{2} (180/sq mi)
- Postal code: 3224

Večje Brdo (pronounced [ˈʋeːtʃjɛ ˈbəɾdɔ]) is a settlement in the Municipality of Dobje in eastern Slovenia. It lies on the road south of Dobje pri Planini towards Planina pri Sevnici. The area is part of the traditional region of Styria. It is now included with the rest of the municipality in the Savinja Statistical Region.
