= Drbetinci =

- Location in Slovenia
- Coordinates: 46°32′9.05″N 15°55′53.48″E
- Country: Slovenia
- Traditional region: Styria
- Statistical region: Drava
- Municipality: Sveti Andraž v Slovenskih Goricah

Area
  - Total: 2.35 km^{2} (0.91 sq mi)
- Elevation: 293 m (961 ft)

Population (2002)
  - Total: 223

Drbetinci (pronounced [dəɾˈbeːtintsi] or [dəɾˈbɛːtintsi]) is a settlement in the Municipality of Sveti Andraž v Slovenskih Goricah in northeastern Slovenia. It lies in the foothills of the Slovene Hills, just north of Vitomarci. The area is part of the traditional region of Styria. It is now included with the rest of the municipality in the Drava Statistical Region.

== Notable people ==
Notable people that were born or lived in Drbetinci include:

- Ivan Jurančič (1861–1935), beekeeper
