= Gibina =

Gibina is a Slovene place name that may refer to:

- Gibina, Razkrižje, a village in the Municipality of Razkrižje, northeastern Slovenia
- Gibina, Sveti Andraž v Slovenskih Goricah, a village in the Municipality of Sveti Andraž v Slovenskih Goricah, northeastern Slovenia
