= Suho, Dobje =

Suho
- Location in Slovenia
- Coordinates: 46°8′43.44″N 15°24′10.22″E
- Country: Slovenia
- Traditional region: Styria
- Statistical region: Savinja
- Municipality: Dobje

Area
  - Total: 0.88 km^{2} (0.34 sq mi)
- Elevation: 533 m (1,749 ft)

Population (2020)
  - Total: 72
  - Density: 82/km^{2} (210/sq mi)
- Postal code: 3224

Suho (pronounced [ˈsuːxɔ]) is a settlement in the Municipality of Dobje in eastern Slovenia. It lies immediately north of Dobje pri Planini. The area is part of the traditional region of Styria. It is now included with the rest of the municipality in the Savinja Statistical Region.
