= Šprinc =

- Location in Slovenia
- Coordinates: 46°30′30.54″N 16°15′38.63″E
- Country: Slovenia
- Traditional region: Zala County, Kingdom of Hungary
- Statistical region: Mura
- Municipality: Razkrižje

Area
  - Total: 0.99 km^{2} (0.38 sq mi)
- Elevation: 271.3 m (890 ft)

Population (2002)
  - Total: 112

Šprinc (pronounced [ˈʃpɾiːnts]) is a small settlement in the Municipality of Razkrižje in eastern Slovenia, next to the border with Croatia. The area traditionally belonged to Zala County in the Kingdom of Hungary and is now included in the Mura Statistical Region.

There is a small chapel-shrine with a belfry in the settlement at the crossroads leading to Kopriva. It was built in the late 19th century.
