= Hajdoše =

- Location in Slovenia
- Coordinates: 46°25′51.46″N 15°49′25.72″E
- Country: Slovenia
- Traditional region: Styria
- Statistical region: Drava
- Municipality: Hajdina

Area
  - Total: 2.6 km^{2} (1.0 sq mi)
- Elevation: 231.5 m (760 ft)

Population (2016)
  - Total: 630
  - Density: 240/km^{2} (620/sq mi)

Hajdoše (pronounced [xai̯ˈdoːʃɛ], in older sources Hudoše, German: Siebendorf) is a settlement on the right bank of the Drava River in the Municipality of Hajdina in northeastern Slovenia. It lies along the regional road from Maribor to Ptuj. The area is part of the traditional region of Styria. It is now included with the rest of the municipality in the Drava Statistical Region.

== History ==
The village was first mentioned in written sources in 1320. It has a chapel-shrine with a small belfry that dates to the early 20th century.

== Social and cultural life ==
The village has several different associations. The best known is the Hajdoše Volunteer Fire Department (PGD Hajdoše). After successes in various firefighting competitions at home and abroad and victories at the Olympic Games in France and in Finland, Hajdoše won the title of the Best Firefighter City in the world. In addition to the Volunteer Fire Department, there are many other active associations in the village: the Hajdoše Sports Association, the FC Hajdoše football club, the Hajdoše Women's Society, and the Valentin Žumer Cultural Association.

A go-cart track was built nest to the Drava River in 1973. It has hosted many national and international go-cart and motorcycle races.
