= Gerečja Vas =

- Location in Slovenia
- Coordinates: 46°25′38.6″N 15°48′26.03″E
- Country: Slovenia
- Traditional region: Styria
- Statistical region: Drava
- Municipality: Hajdina

Area
  - Total: 2.57 km^{2} (0.99 sq mi)
- Elevation: 237.1 m (778 ft)

Population (2002)
  - Total: 534

Gerečja Vas (pronounced [ˈɡeːɾɛtʃja ˈʋaːs]; Slovene: Gerečja vas, German: Gersdorf) is a village in the Municipality of Hajdina in northeastern Slovenia. The area is part of the traditional region of Styria. It is now included with the rest of the municipality in the Drava Statistical Region.

Archaeological excavations near the settlement in 2008 unveiled prehistoric settlement layers.
