= Veščica, Razkrižje =

Veščica
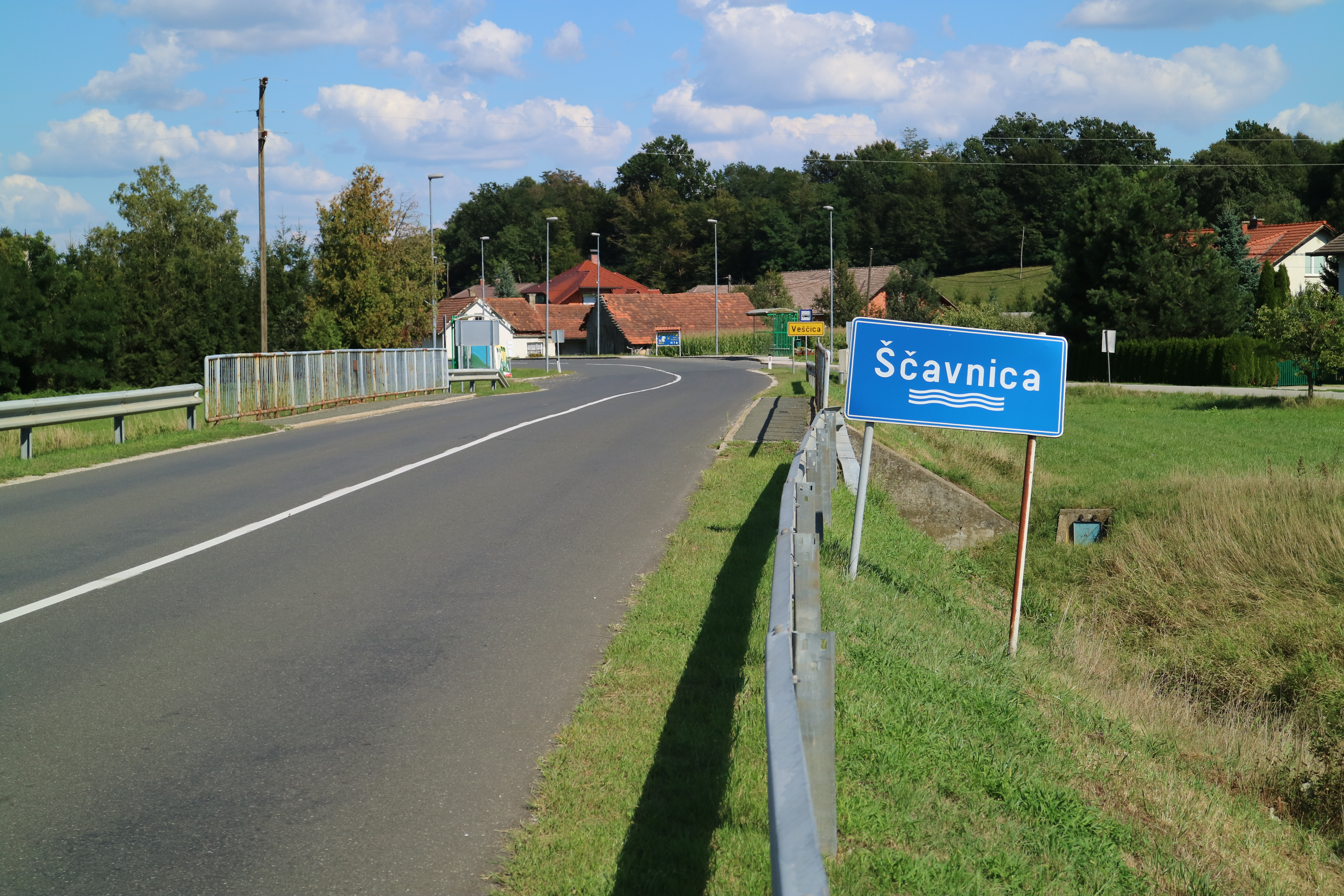

- Location in Slovenia
- Coordinates: 46°31′14.83″N 16°15′23.42″E
- Country: Slovenia
- Traditional region: Međimurje, Zala County
- Statistical region: Mura
- Municipality: Razkrižje

Area
  - Total: 3.16 km^{2} (1.22 sq mi)
- Elevation: 170.2 m (558 ft)

Population (2002)
  - Total: 302

Veščica (pronounced [ʋɛˈʃtʃiːtsa]; Hungarian: Végfalva) is a settlement on the banks of the Ščavnica River in the Municipality of Razkrižje in eastern Slovenia, next to the border with Croatia. The area traditionally belonged to Zala County in the Kingdom of Hungary and is now included in the Mura Statistical Region.
