= Cogetinci =

- Location in Slovenia
- Coordinates: 46°34′50.71″N 15°57′45.23″E
- Country: Slovenia
- Traditional region: Styria
- Statistical region: Drava
- Municipality: Cerkvenjak

Area
  - Total: 4.17 km^{2} (1.61 sq mi)
- Elevation: 232 m (761 ft)

Population (2020)
  - Total: 257
  - Density: 61.6/km^{2} (160/sq mi)

Cogetinci (pronounced [ˈtsoːɡɛtintsi]) is a settlement in the Municipality of Cerkvenjak in northeastern Slovenia. It lies in the Slovene Hills (Slovene: Slovenske gorice) northeast of Cerkvenjak. It was first mentioned as Czogendorf in an urbarium from the Archbishopric of Salzburg dating to 1321. The area is part of the traditional region of Styria and is now included in the Drava Statistical Region.

A small chapel-shrine in the settlement dates to the late 19th century.
