= Brezje pri Dobjem =

- Location in Slovenia
- Coordinates: 46°7′52.31″N 15°23′57.73″E
- Country: Slovenia
- Traditional region: Styria
- Statistical region: Savinja
- Municipality: Dobje

Area
  - Total: 1.67 km^{2} (0.64 sq mi)
- Elevation: 511.1 m (1,677 ft)

Population (2020)
  - Total: 85
  - Density: 51/km^{2} (130/sq mi)
- Postal code: 3224

Brezje pri Dobjem (pronounced [ˈbɾeːzjɛ pɾi ˈdoːbjɛm]) is a settlement in the Municipality of Dobje in eastern Slovenia. The area is part of the traditional region of Styria. It is now included with the rest of the municipality in the Savinja Statistical Region.

== Name ==
The name of the settlement was changed from Brezje to Brezje pri Dobjem in 1953.
