= Komarnica, Cerkvenjak =

Komarnica
- Location in Slovenia
- Coordinates: 46°34′57.1″N 15°56′39.11″E
- Country: Slovenia
- Traditional region: Styria
- Statistical region: Drava
- Municipality: Cerkvenjak

Area
  - Total: 0.29 km^{2} (0.11 sq mi)
- Elevation: 270.4 m (887 ft)

Population (2020)
  - Total: 43
  - Density: 150/km^{2} (380/sq mi)

Komarnica (pronounced [kɔˈmaːɾnitsa]) is a small settlement in the Slovene Hills (Slovene: Slovenske gorice) in the Municipality of Cerkvenjak in northeastern Slovenia. The area is part of the traditional region of Styria. It is now included in the Drava Statistical Region.
