= Hvaletinci =

- Location in Slovenia
- Coordinates: 46°30′44.55″N 15°57′7.09″E
- Country: Slovenia
- Traditional region: Styria
- Statistical region: Drava
- Municipality: Sveti Andraž v Slovenskih Goricah

Area
  - Total: 2.65 km^{2} (1.02 sq mi)
- Elevation: 225.7 m (740 ft)

Population (2002)
  - Total: 110

Hvaletinci (pronounced [ˈxʋaːlɛtintsi]) is a village in the Municipality of Sveti Andraž v Slovenskih Goricah in northeastern Slovenia. It lies in the foothills of the Slovene Hills in the valley of Brnca Creek, a minor left tributary of the Pesnica River. The area is part of the traditional region of Styria. It is now included with the rest of the municipality in the Drava Statistical Region.

The village chapel dates to the 19th century.
