= Vanetina =

- Location in Slovenia
- Coordinates: 46°34′27.4″N 15°55′7.01″E
- Country: Slovenia
- Traditional region: Styria
- Statistical region: Drava
- Municipality: Cerkvenjak

Area
  - Total: 1.49 km^{2} (0.58 sq mi)
- Elevation: 302 m (991 ft)

Population (2020)
  - Total: 70
  - Density: 47/km^{2} (120/sq mi)

Vanetina (pronounced [ˈʋaːnɛtina]) is a village in the Municipality of Cerkvenjak in northeastern Slovenia. It lies in the Slovene Hills (Slovene: Slovenske gorice). The area is part of the traditional region of Styria and is now included in the Drava Statistical Region.

The local chapel-shrine was built in around 1900 and has a large belfry.
