= Završe pri Dobjem =

- Location in Slovenia
- Coordinates: 46°8′12.65″N 15°22′43.33″E
- Country: Slovenia
- Traditional region: Styria
- Statistical region: Savinja
- Municipality: Dobje

Area
  - Total: 1.29 km^{2} (0.50 sq mi)
- Elevation: 588.2 m (1,930 ft)

Population (2020)
  - Total: 25
  - Density: 19/km^{2} (50/sq mi)
- Postal code: 3224

Završe pri Dobjem (pronounced [ˈzaːʋəɾʃɛ pɾi ˈdoːbjɛm]) is a small settlement in the Municipality of Dobje in eastern Slovenia. The municipality is part of the traditional region of Styria. It is now included with the rest of the municipality in the Savinja Statistical Region.

== Name ==
The name of the settlement was changed from Završe to Završe pri Dobjem in 1953.
