= Škarnice =

- Location in Slovenia
- Coordinates: 46°8′31.03″N 15°23′8.15″E
- Country: Slovenia
- Traditional region: Styria
- Statistical region: Savinja
- Municipality: Dobje

Area
  - Total: 1.24 km^{2} (0.48 sq mi)
- Elevation: 504.3 m (1,655 ft)

Population (2020)
  - Total: 103
  - Density: 83.1/km^{2} (215/sq mi)
- Postal code: 3224

Škarnice (pronounced [ʃkaɾˈniːtsɛ]) is a settlement in the Municipality of Dobje in eastern Slovenia. The municipality is part of the traditional region of Styria. It is now included in the Savinja Statistical Region.
