= Slovenja Vas =

- Location in Slovenia
- Coordinates: 46°26′27.54″N 15°48′22.54″E
- Country: Slovenia
- Traditional region: Styria
- Statistical region: Drava
- Municipality: Hajdina

Area
  - Total: 4.61 km^{2} (1.78 sq mi)
- Elevation: 235.9 m (774 ft)

Population (2002)
  - Total: 509

Slovenja Vas (pronounced [slɔˈʋeːnja ˈʋaːs]; Slovene: Slovenja vas, in older sources Slovenja Ves, German: Windischdorf) is a settlement on the right bank of the Drava River in the Municipality of Hajdina in northeastern Slovenia. The area is part of the traditional region of Styria. It is now included with the rest of the municipality in the Drava Statistical Region.

The village chapel with a small belfry dates to the early 20th century.
