= Brengova =

- Location in Slovenia
- Coordinates: 46°33′47.11″N 15°55′22.76″E
- Country: Slovenia
- Traditional region: Styria
- Statistical region: Drava
- Municipality: Cerkvenjak

Area
  - Total: 4.15 km^{2} (1.60 sq mi)
- Elevation: 236.9 m (777 ft)

Population (2020)
  - Total: 242
  - Density: 58.3/km^{2} (151/sq mi)

Brengova (pronounced [ˈbɾeːŋɡɔʋa]) is a settlement in the Slovene Hills (Slovene: Slovenske gorice) in the Municipality of Cerkvenjak in northeastern Slovenia. The area is part of the traditional region of Styria and is now included in the Drava Statistical Region.

Two small chapel-shrines in the settlement date to the late 19th and early 20th centuries.

Roman period burial sites have been identified in the area.
