= Repuš =

- Location in Slovenia
- Coordinates: 46°8′21.97″N 15°24′36.62″E
- Country: Slovenia
- Traditional region: Styria
- Statistical region: Savinja
- Municipality: Dobje

Area
  - Total: 1.22 km^{2} (0.47 sq mi)
- Elevation: 565.8 m (1,856 ft)

Population (2020)
  - Total: 44
  - Density: 36/km^{2} (93/sq mi)
- Postal code: 3224

Repuš (pronounced [ɾɛˈpuːʃ]) is a village in the Municipality of Dobje in eastern Slovenia. The area is part of the traditional region of Styria. It is now included with the rest of the municipality in the Savinja Statistical Region.

A number of buildings in the village core date to the late 18th and early 19th century. They are well preserved and typical farm buildings of the period and are as such included in the Slovenian Ministry of Culture's register of national heritage.
