= Kadrenci =

- Location in Slovenia
- Coordinates: 46°33′54.87″N 15°57′22.17″E
- Country: Slovenia
- Traditional region: Styria
- Statistical region: Drava
- Municipality: Cerkvenjak

Area
  - Total: 0.3 km^{2} (0.12 sq mi)
- Elevation: 278.8 m (915 ft)

Population (2020)
  - Total: 89
  - Density: 300/km^{2} (770/sq mi)

Kadrenci (pronounced [ˈkaːdɾɛntsi]) is a small settlement in the Municipality of Cerkvenjak in northeastern Slovenia. It lies in the Slovene Hills (Slovene: Slovenske gorice), on the south side of the regional road leading east from Cerkvenjak to Sveti Jurij ob Ščavnici. The area is part of the traditional region of Styria and is now included in the Drava Statistical Region.
