= Peščeni Vrh =

- Location in Slovenia
- Coordinates: 46°33′37.24″N 15°57′39.23″E
- Country: Slovenia
- Traditional region: Styria
- Statistical region: Drava
- Municipality: Cerkvenjak

Area
  - Total: 0.4 km^{2} (0.15 sq mi)
- Elevation: 314.2 m (1,031 ft)

Population (2020)
  - Total: 121
  - Density: 300/km^{2} (780/sq mi)

Peščeni Vrh (pronounced [ˈpeːʃtʃɛni ˈʋəɾx]) is a small settlement in the Municipality of Cerkvenjak in northeastern Slovenia. It lies in the Slovene Hills (Slovene: Slovenske gorice) east of Cerkvenjak. The area is part of the traditional region of Styria. The entire municipality is now included in the Drava Statistical Region.
