= Jože Brilej =

Slovene diplomat (1910–1981)

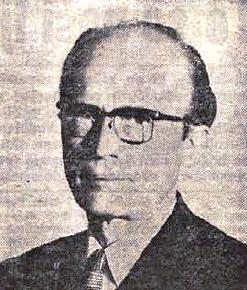
Jože Brilej

Jože Brilej (nom de guerre "Bolko," 1 January 1910 – 8 May 1981) was a Yugoslav jurist, politician, diplomat, Communist revolutionary, and close associate of Josip Broz Tito. During his diplomatic career, he was the ambassador of Yugoslavia to the United Kingdom (1950–1952), head of the Yugoslav mission to the United Nations (1954–1958), and ambassador to Egypt (1961–1963 and 1968–1981).

== Career ==
Brilej was born in Presečno, Dobje pri Planini, Slovenia. He served as the Yugoslav ambassador to London, New York City, Mexico, Cairo, Egypt and Yemen, permanent representative of Yugoslavia to the United Nations for life, President of the United Nations Security Council in 1956, member of the United Nations Special Committee on Palestine, president of the supreme court of Slovenia, editor of Ljudska pravica, and political commissar and colonel in the Partisan National Liberation Army during World War II.

== Early life ==
Brilej was the youngest of ten children born in Presecno near Dobje pri Planini, then still part of the Austro-Hungarian Empire. His father died when he was very young, soon followed by his oldest brother, who had become provisional head of the family. A bright and gifted child, local Catholic priests recognised Brilej's merits at a young age and sponsored his further education at a private monastic boarding school and later at a seminary in Maribor, where he initially studied to become a priest. After completing his first year of seminary studies, Brilej realised his newly found political beliefs and relationship with his future wife were no longer aligned with that of the Catholic Church and he transferred to study law at the University of Ljubljana.

== Early politics ==
In 1932, while still a student, he had become a fully fledged member of the Yugoslav Communist Party. In 1934 he was made the Yugoslav Communist Party delegate for Slovenia. At the same time he became the founding editor of the Communist Party newspaper Ljudska pravica, the production and distribution of which was made illegal in 1936. During this period, Brilej was briefly arrested and imprisoned in Ljubljana. In 1938 he graduated from the University of Ljubljana with a PhD in law. The same year he enrolled and began studies to become a medical doctor, which was interrupted by the outbreak of the Second World War.

== World War II ==
As an active Yugoslav Communist Party and Slovenian socialist party member before the war, he immediately joined the Slovene Partisans Yugoslav Partisan liberation resistance army at the outbreak of World War II. He served as political commissar and as the equivalent rank of colonel in Tomsič Brigade in the Slovene Partisan army's 14th Division. Brilej's friend the poet and writer Karel "Kajuh" Destovnik was also in his brigade. Other friends and comrades in the 14th Division included Franc Rozman, Anton Vratusa, Joze Lampret, and Mirko Bracic. Throughout the war he used the nom de guerre "Bolko". He conducted many covert undercover intelligence operations during the war, as well as fighting in guerrilla campaigns and maintaining troop morale and political literacy. Due to his education and command of German he led numerous hostage negotiations and exchanges with Nazi officials often with his friend and comrade Aleš Bebler. He led his battalion on many missions to rescue Allied personnel who were trapped behind enemy lines or had become German prisoners. Mainly these were British RAF pilots and soldiers. Most notably he led a successful rescue mission to rescue Major Randolph Churchill and his battalion within half an hour of their being captured by the German forces.

== Political and diplomatic career ==
He was Yugoslavia's first official ambassador to London, England. He was presented at the Court of St James's and succeeded in having the Federal Republic of Yugoslavia recognised by the British government. At the time of his appointment, he was Yugoslavia's youngest diplomat at a transitional time for England with the funeral of King George VI and the coronation of Queen Elizabeth II. He was well received in England also due to his and his wife's wartime bravery, during which he rescued and safely returned many Allied and British personnel particularly from the RAF, most prominently Major Randolph Churchill. During his time in London he became friends with Winston Churchill and Sir Fitzroy Maclean. As a result, he and President Tito hosted Anthony Eden at Lake Bled, Slovenia as the first western leader to formally recognise the new country.

=== United Nations ===
His involvement with the United Nations began in London and Rome almost immediately after its founding after World War II, later in New York where he was also Ambassador of Yugoslavia. He was a member of United Nations Special Committee on Palestine. He was elected President of the United Nations Security Council in 1956 at the Headquarters of the United Nations New York. He remained a permanent representative for Yugoslavia to the United Nations throughout his life.

== Personal life ==
He was the husband of Marta Brilej (1917–2016). They were married on 11 July 1936 at the Ljubljana Cathedral. They had a son, Joze Brilej (born 1937), and a daughter, Tatiana (Tatjana) Brilej (born 1947).

Brilej died on 8 May 1981 in Ljubljana from lung cancer. He is buried at Žale cemetery in Ljubljana alongside his wife Marta Brilej and opposite his lifelong friend, Partisan comrade and diplomat Aleš Bebler.

== Commemorations ==
Brilej Street (Slovene: Brilejeva ulica) in Ljubljana is named after him.

On 9 August 1987 a commemorative government plaque was unveiled on the house where he was born in Presečno, Dobje pri Planini.

=== Awards and decorations ===
Some of the awards and decorations of Jože Brilej include:

Medals and Decorations	Class	Country	Notes
Order of the Aztec Eagle	Sash ("Banda")	Mexico	Highest honour of Mexico to a foreigner
Order of the Phoenix	Grand Cross	Greece	Highest honour of Greece to a foreigner
Order of Merit of the Italian Republic	1st Class, Knight of the Grand Cross	Italy	Highest ranking honor of the Republic of Italy
Order of the Republic	Grand Cordon, First Class	Egypt	Egyptian order of knighthood
Order of the Yugoslav Flag	Sash, First Class with gold wreath	Yugoslavia	awarded to ambassadors for diplomatic missions
Order of Merits for the People	First and Second class	Yugoslavia	
Order of the Republic	1st class with gold wreath	Yugoslavia	
Order of National Liberation		Yugoslavia	
Commemorative Medal of the Partisans 1941		Yugoslavia	Commemorative
Order of the Partisan Star		Yugoslavia	
