= Slavšina =

- Location in Slovenia
- Coordinates: 46°31′57.1″N 15°59′2.41″E
- Country: Slovenia
- Traditional region: Styria
- Statistical region: Drava
- Municipality: Sveti Andraž v Slovenskih Goricah

Area
  - Total: 1.44 km^{2} (0.56 sq mi)
- Elevation: 280.1 m (919 ft)

Population (2002)
  - Total: 163

Slavšina (pronounced [ˈslaːu̯ʃina]) is a settlement in the Municipality of Sveti Andraž v Slovenskih Goricah in northeastern Slovenia. It lies in the Slovene Hills, part of the traditional region of Styria. The area is now included in the Drava Statistical Region.

The village chapel dates to the last quarter of the 19th century.
