= Lažiše =

- Location in Slovenia
- Coordinates: 46°7′44.22″N 15°22′21.24″E
- Country: Slovenia
- Traditional region: Styria
- Statistical region: Savinja
- Municipality: Dobje

Area
  - Total: 3.37 km^{2} (1.30 sq mi)
- Elevation: 525.9 m (1,725 ft)

Population (2020)
  - Total: 139
  - Density: 41.2/km^{2} (107/sq mi)
- Postal code: 3224

Lažiše (pronounced [laˈʒiːʃɛ]) is a settlement in the Municipality of Dobje in eastern Slovenia. The area is part of the traditional region of Styria. It is now included with the rest of the municipality in the Savinja Statistical Region.
