= Gorica pri Dobjem =

- Location in Slovenia
- Coordinates: 46°8′5.42″N 15°24′46.75″E
- Country: Slovenia
- Traditional region: Styria
- Statistical region: Savinja
- Municipality: Dobje

Area
  - Total: 0.62 km^{2} (0.24 sq mi)
- Elevation: 555.9 m (1,824 ft)

Population (2020)
  - Total: 37
  - Density: 60/km^{2} (150/sq mi)
- Postal code: 3224

Gorica pri Dobjem (pronounced [ɡɔˈɾiːtsa pɾi ˈdoːbjɛm]) is a small settlement in the Municipality of Dobje in eastern Slovenia. The area is part of the traditional region of Styria. It is now included with the rest of the municipality in the Savinja Statistical Region.

== Name ==
The name of the settlement was changed from Gorica to Gorica pri Dobjem in 1953.

== Cultural heritage ==
A small chapel in the settlement dates to 1860.
