= Cenkova =

Cenkova Zenkau
- Location in Slovenia
- Coordinates: 46°34′28.1″N 15°56′20.76″E
- Country: Slovenia
- Traditional region: Styria
- Statistical region: Drava
- Municipality: Cerkvenjak

Area
  - Total: 0.45 km^{2} (0.17 sq mi)
- Elevation: 294.2 m (965 ft)

Population (2020)
  - Total: 44
  - Density: 98/km^{2} (250/sq mi)

Cenkova (pronounced [ˈtseːnkɔʋa]) is a small settlement in the Municipality of Cerkvenjak in northeastern Slovenia. The area is part of the traditional region of Styria and is now included in the Drava Statistical Region.

The local chapel-shrine is a Neo-Gothic structure with a belfry and was built in 1920.
