= Čagona =

- Location in Slovenia
- Coordinates: 46°32′54.58″N 15°55′30.32″E
- Country: Slovenia
- Traditional region: Styria
- Statistical region: Drava
- Municipality: Cerkvenjak

Area
  - Total: 3.34 km^{2} (1.29 sq mi)
- Elevation: 267.8 m (879 ft)

Population (2020)
  - Total: 235

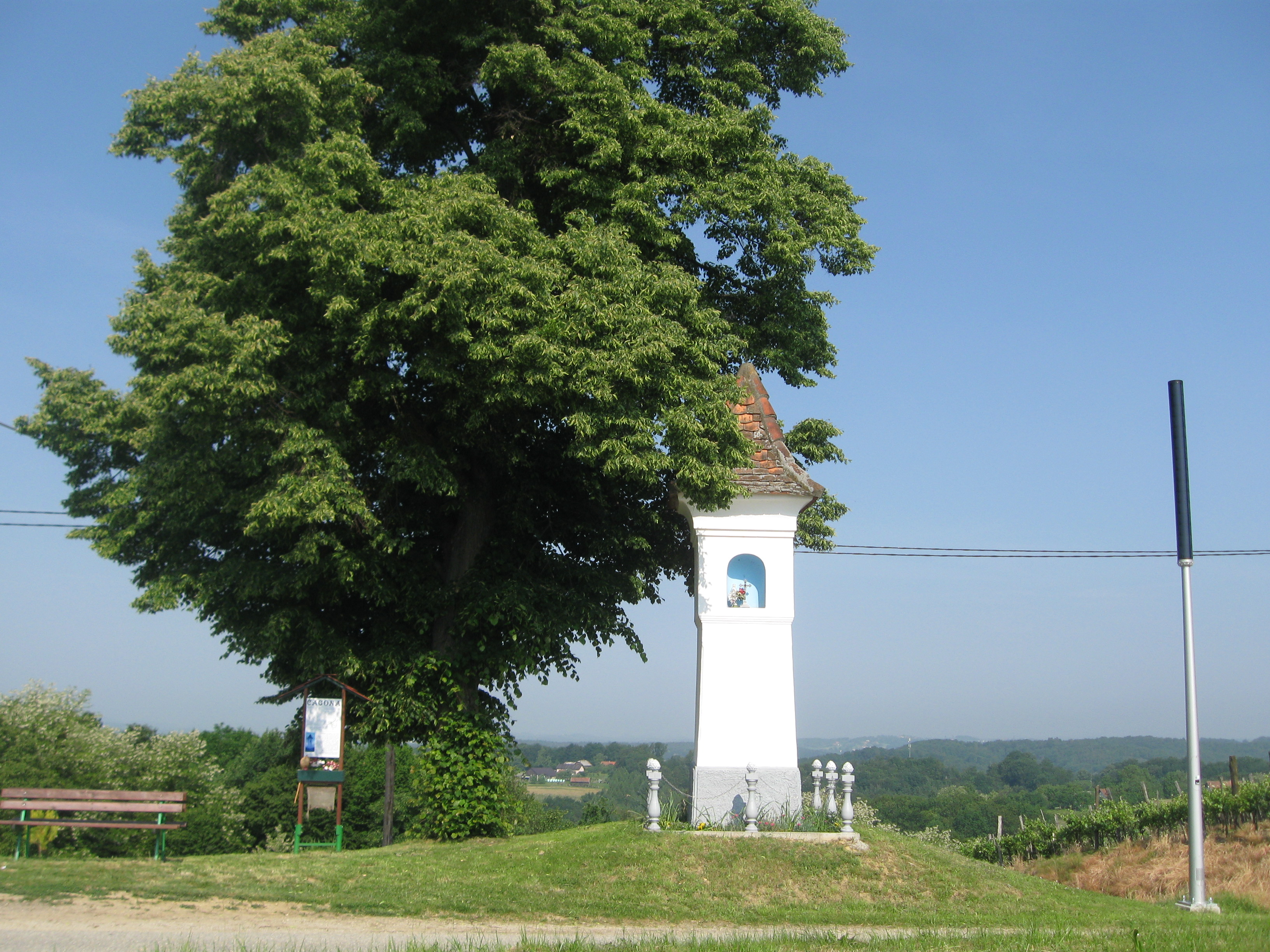
Plague columns in Čagona

Čagona (pronounced [ˈtʃaːɡɔna], German: Tschaga) is a settlement in the Municipality of Cerkvenjak in northeastern Slovenia. It lies on the edge of the Slovene Hills (Slovene: Slovenske gorice) and partly in the Pesnica Valley. The area is part of the traditional region of Styria and is now included in the Drava Statistical Region.
