= Andrenci =

- Location in Slovenia
- Coordinates: 46°33′26.25″N 15°56′57.72″E
- Country: Slovenia
- Traditional region: Styria
- Statistical region: Drava
- Municipality: Cerkvenjak

Area
  - Total: 3 km^{2} (1.2 sq mi)
- Elevation: 311.1 m (1,021 ft)

Population (2020)
  - Total: 168
  - Density: 56/km^{2} (150/sq mi)

Andrenci (pronounced [anˈdɾeːntsi]) is a settlement in the Municipality of Cerkvenjak in northeastern Slovenia. It lies in the Slovene Hills (Slovene: Slovenske gorice) south of Cerkvenjak. The area is part of the traditional region of Styria and is now included in the Drava Statistical Region.

A small chapel-shrine with a wooden belfry in the settlement was built in the 19th century.

Bronze Age and Roman period sites have been identified close to the settlement.
