= Ravno (disambiguation) =

Ravno is a South Slavic toponym, meaning "flat". It may refer to:

- Ravno, a village and a municipality in Bosnia and Herzegovina
- Ravno, Dobje, a village in Slovenia
- Ravno, Krško, a village in Slovenia
