= Ivanjski Vrh, Cerkvenjak =

Small settlement in northeastern Slovenia near Cerkvenjak

Ivanjski Vrh
- Location in Slovenia
- Coordinates: 46°35′9.16″N 15°57′47.43″E
- Country: Slovenia
- Traditional region: Styria
- Statistical region: Drava
- Municipality: Cerkvenjak

Area
  - Total: 0.27 km^{2} (0.10 sq mi)
- Elevation: 260.6 m (855 ft)

Population (2020)
  - Total: 56
  - Density: 210/km^{2} (540/sq mi)

Ivanjski Vrh (pronounced [iˈʋaːnski ˈʋəɾx]) is a small settlement in the Municipality of Cerkvenjak in northeastern Slovenia. It lies in the Slovene Hills (Slovene: Slovenske gorice) north of Cerkvenjak, just off the road towards Spodnji Ivanjci. The area is part of the traditional region of Styria and is now included in the Drava Statistical Region.
