= Skorba, Hajdina =

Skorba
- Location in Slovenia
- Coordinates: 46°25′10.73″N 15°49′59.29″E
- Country: Slovenia
- Traditional region: Styria
- Statistical region: Drava
- Municipality: Hajdina

Area
  - Total: 2.46 km^{2} (0.95 sq mi)
- Elevation: 229.3 m (752 ft)

Population (2002)
  - Total: 372

Skorba (pronounced [ˈskɔːɾba]) is a village in the Municipality of Hajdina in northeastern Slovenia. The area is part of the traditional region of Styria. It is included with the rest of the municipality in the Drava Statistical Region.

A number of archaeological finds close to the settlement, including a villa rustica, are associated with the nearby Roman town of Poetovio.
