= Jezerce pri Dobjem =

- Location in Slovenia
- Coordinates: 46°9′12″N 15°23′56.45″E
- Country: Slovenia
- Traditional region: Styria
- Statistical region: Savinja
- Municipality: Dobje

Area
  - Total: 1.32 km^{2} (0.51 sq mi)
- Elevation: 483.5 m (1,586 ft)

Population (2020)
  - Total: 62
  - Density: 47/km^{2} (120/sq mi)
- Postal code: 3224

Jezerce pri Dobjem (pronounced [jɛˈzɛːɾtsɛ pɾi ˈdoːbjɛm]) is a small settlement in the Municipality of Dobje in eastern Slovenia. The area is part of the traditional region of Styria. It is now included with the rest of the municipality in the Savinja Statistical Region.

== Name ==
The name of the settlement was changed from Jezerce to Jezerce pri Dobjem in 1953.
