= Grabonoški Vrh =

- Location in Slovenia
- Coordinates: 46°34′41.76″N 15°58′10.43″E
- Country: Slovenia
- Traditional region: Styria
- Statistical region: Drava
- Municipality: Cerkvenjak

Area
  - Total: 0.53 km^{2} (0.20 sq mi)
- Elevation: 281.5 m (924 ft)

Population (2020)
  - Total: 98
  - Density: 180/km^{2} (480/sq mi)

Grabonoški Vrh (pronounced [ɡɾabɔˈnoːʃki ˈʋəɾx]) is a settlement in the Municipality of Cerkvenjak in northeastern Slovenia. It lies in the Slovene Hills (Slovene: Slovenske gorice) east of Cerkvenjak. The area is part of the traditional region of Styria and is now included in the Drava Statistical Region.

Two of originally six Roman period burial mounds are still preserved in a nearby forest. Artefacts from the four destroyed in 1954 are kept in the regional museum in Maribor.
