= Rjavci =

- Location in Slovenia
- Coordinates: 46°31′23.16″N 15°57′38.27″E
- Country: Slovenia
- Traditional region: Styria
- Statistical region: Drava
- Municipality: Sveti Andraž v Slovenskih Goricah

Area
  - Total: 1.52 km^{2} (0.59 sq mi)
- Elevation: 293.8 m (964 ft)

Population (2002)
  - Total: 98

Rjavci (pronounced [ˈɾjaːu̯tsi]) is a small settlement in the Municipality of Sveti Andraž v Slovenskih Goricah in northeastern Slovenia. It lies in the foothills of the Slovene Hills in the traditional region of Styria. The municipality is now included in the Drava Statistical Region.
