= Presečno =

Presečno may refer to:

- Presečno, Slovenia, a village near Dobje
- Presečno, Croatia, a village near Novi Marof
