= Stanetinci, Cerkvenjak =

Stanetinci
- Location in Slovenia
- Coordinates: 46°33′24.8″N 15°56′37.5″E
- Country: Slovenia
- Traditional region: Styria
- Statistical region: Drava
- Municipality: Cerkvenjak

Area
  - Total: 1.89 km^{2} (0.73 sq mi)
- Elevation: 323.5 m (1,061 ft)

Population (2020)
  - Total: 145
  - Density: 76.7/km^{2} (199/sq mi)

Stanetinci (pronounced [ˈstaːnɛtintsi]) is a settlement in the Municipality of Cerkvenjak in northeastern Slovenia. It lies in the Slovene Hills (Slovene: Slovenske gorice) south of Cerkvenjak. The area is part of the traditional region of Styria and is now included in the Drava Statistical Region.

A small Neo-Gothic chapel-shrine in the settlement was built in the last quarter of the 19th century.
