= Smolinci =

- Location in Slovenia
- Coordinates: 46°32′41.81″N 15°58′22.38″E
- Country: Slovenia
- Traditional region: Styria
- Statistical region: Drava
- Municipality: Cerkvenjak

Area
  - Total: 1.04 km^{2} (0.40 sq mi)
- Elevation: 271.3 m (890 ft)

Population (2020)
  - Total: 179
  - Density: 172/km^{2} (446/sq mi)

Smolinci (pronounced [smɔˈliːntsi]) is a settlement in the Municipality of Cerkvenjak in northeastern Slovenia. It lies in the Slovene Hills (Slovene: Slovenske gorice) in the traditional region of Styria. The municipality is now included in the Drava Statistical Region.
