= Municipality of Hajdina =

Municipality of Slovenia

Municipality of Hajdina Občina Hajdina
- Municipality
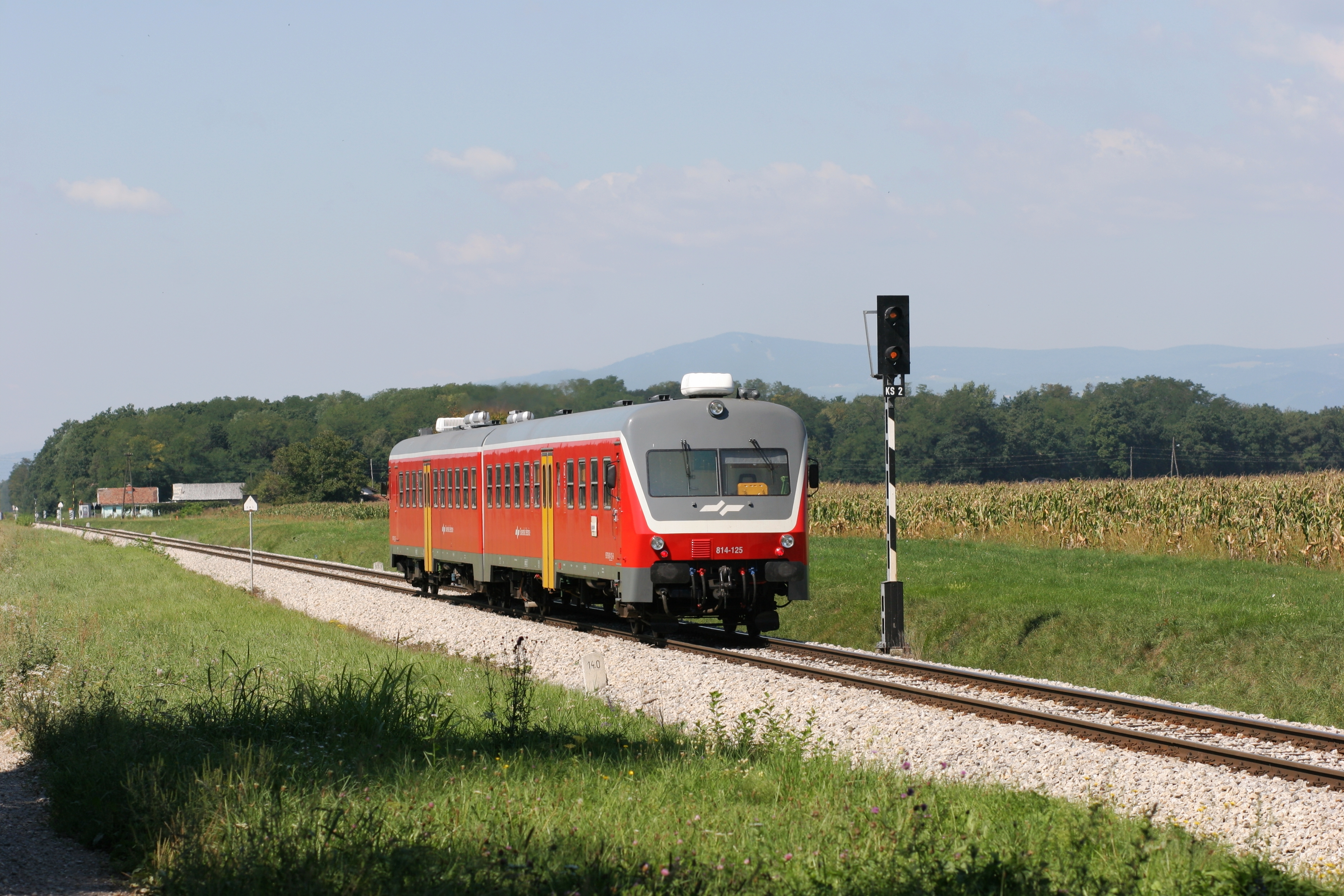

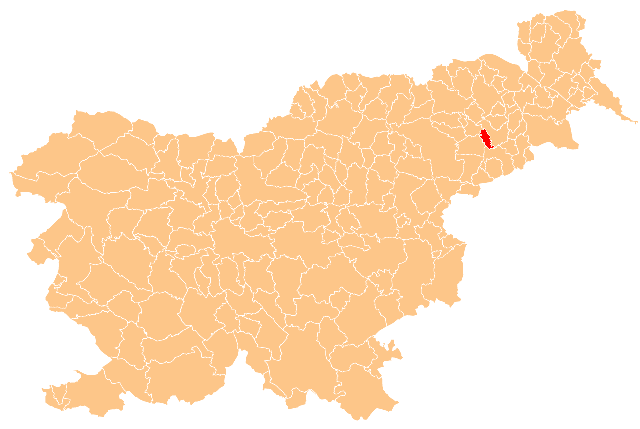
- Location of the Municipality of Hajdina in Slovenia
- Coordinates: 46°25′N 15°50′E
- Country: Slovenia

Government
  - Mayor: Stanislav Glažar (Independent)

Area
  - Total: 21.6 km^{2} (8.3 sq mi)

Population (2016)
  - Total: 3,712
  - Density: 172/km^{2} (445/sq mi)
- Time zone: UTC+01 (CET)
  - Summer (DST): UTC+02 (CEST)
- Website: www.hajdina.si

The Municipality of Hajdina (pronounced [xai̯ˈdiːna]; Slovene: Občina Hajdina) is a small municipality on the right bank of the Drava River near Ptuj in northeastern Slovenia. Its administrative seat is the village of Zgornja Hajdina. The area is part of the traditional region of Styria. The municipality is now included in the Drava Statistical Region. Sights include relics of the Roman settlement of Poetovio and the parish church of Saint Martin in Zgornja Hajdina.

== Settlements ==
In addition to the municipal seat of Zgornja Hajdina, the municipality also includes the following settlements:

- Draženci
- Gerečja Vas
- Hajdoše
- Skorba
- Slovenja Vas
- Spodnja Hajdina
