= Razkrižje =

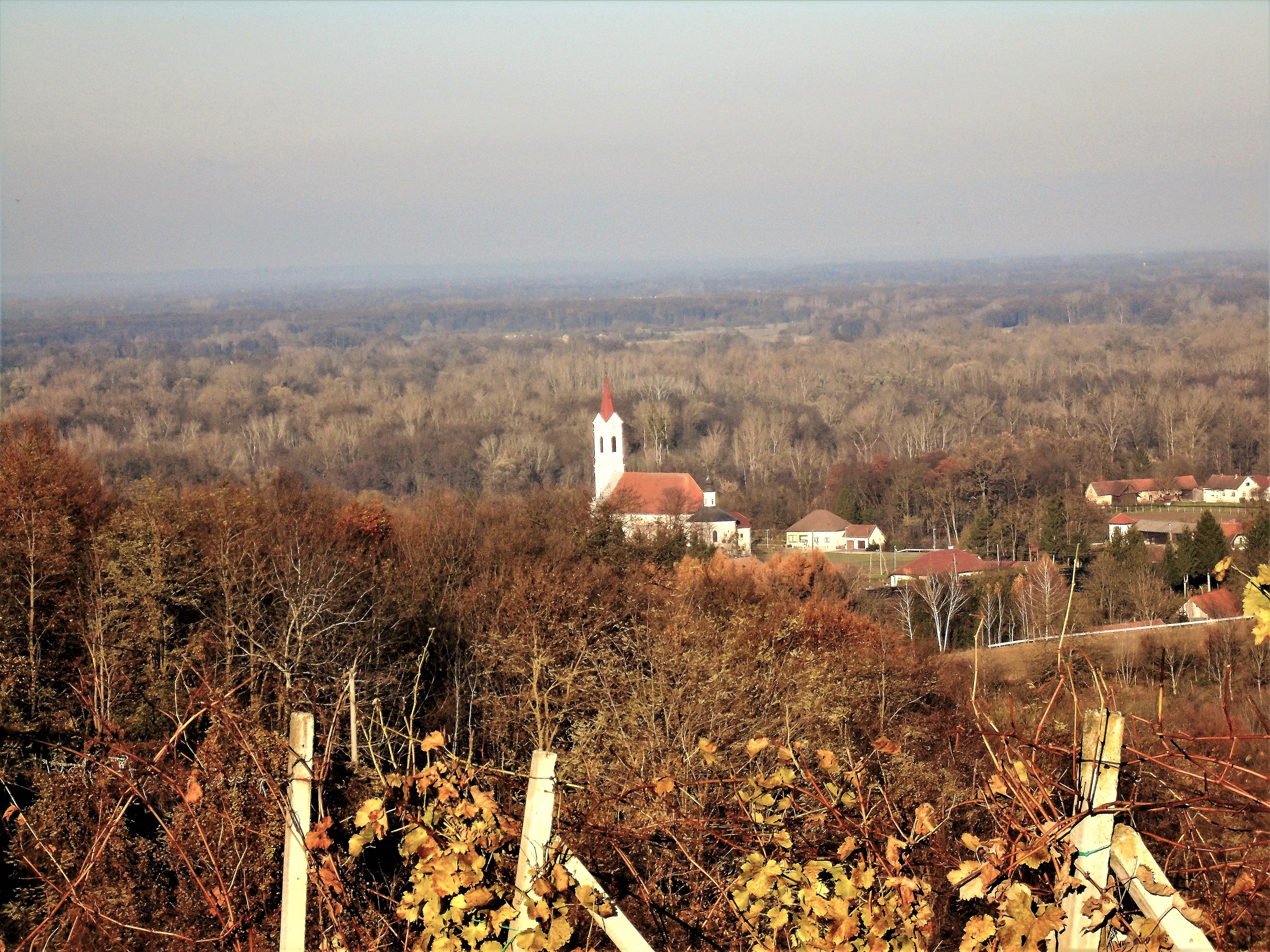
- Saint John of Nepomuk Church in Razkrižje

- Location in Slovenia
- Coordinates: 46°31′19″N 16°16′43″E
- Country: Slovenia
- Traditional region: Međimurje, Zala County
- Statistical region: Mura
- Municipality: Razkrižje

Area
  - Total: 1.9 km^{2} (0.73 sq mi)
- Elevation: 180.2 m (591 ft)

Population (2012)
  - Total: 260

Razkrižje (pronounced [ˈɾaːskɾiʒjɛ]; Croatian: Raskrižje, Hungarian: Ráckanizsa) is a village in Slovenia. It is the seat of the Municipality of Razkrižje. Traditionally it was part of the region of Međimurje in Croatia, and later (after the Second World War) was included in the Slovene region of Styria, lying on its extreme eastern tip. It is now included in the Mura Statistical Region. It is known for its folk dances, which incorporate diverse cultural influences, owing to the village's location at the crossroads of paths connecting Styria, Prekmurje, and Međimurje.

The parish church in the settlement is dedicated to Saint John of Nepomuk and belongs to the Roman Catholic Diocese of Murska Sobota. It was built between 1778 and 1784. The front of the church also appears in one of the three fields in the municipal coat of arms.
