= Municipality of Dobje =

Municipality of Slovenia

Municipality of Dobje Občina Dobje
- Municipality
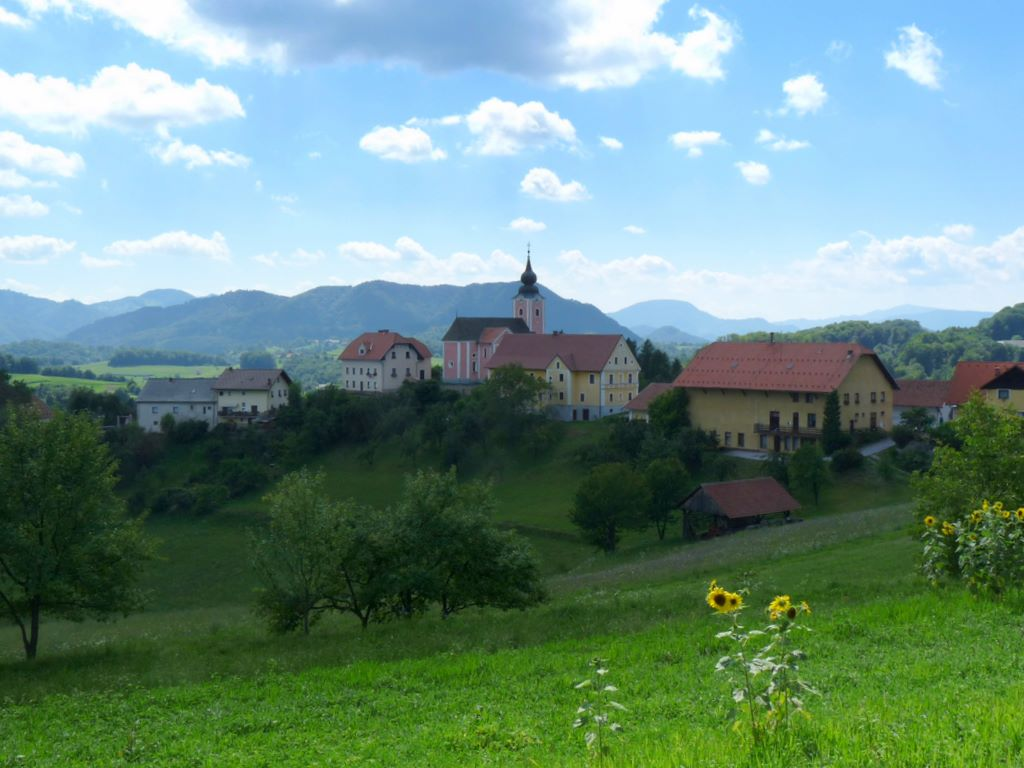

- Coordinates: 46°8′13″N 15°23′40″E
- Country: Slovenia

Government
  - Mayor: Franc Leskovšek (SLS)

Area
  - Total: 17.5 km^{2} (6.8 sq mi)

Population (2020)
  - Total: 949
  - Density: 54.2/km^{2} (140/sq mi)
- Time zone: UTC+01 (CET)
  - Summer (DST): UTC+02 (CEST)
- Postal code: 3224
- Website: www.dobje.si

The Municipality of Dobje (pronounced [ˈdoːbjɛ]; Slovene: Občina Dobje) is a municipality in eastern Slovenia. The area is part of the traditional region of Styria. The municipality is now included in the Savinja Statistical Region. The entire municipality has just over 1,000 inhabitants. Its seat is Dobje pri Planini.

== Settlements ==
In addition to the municipal seat of Dobje pri Planini, the municipality also includes the following settlements:

- Brezje pri Dobjem
- Gorica pri Dobjem
- Jezerce pri Dobjem
- Lažiše
- Presečno
- Ravno
- Repuš
- Škarnice
- Slatina pri Dobjem
- Suho
- Večje Brdo
- Završe pri Dobjem
