= Municipality of Razkrižje =

Municipality of Slovenia

Municipality of Razkrižje Občina Razkrižje
- Municipality
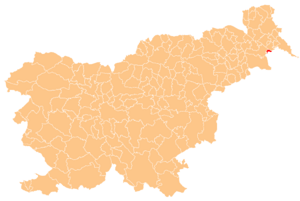
- Location of the Municipality of Razkrižje in Slovenia
- Coordinates: 46°31′N 16°17′E
- Country: Slovenia

Government
  - Mayor: Stanko Ivanušič

Area
  - Total: 9.8 km^{2} (3.8 sq mi)

Population (2002)
  - Total: 1,215
  - Density: 120/km^{2} (320/sq mi)
- Time zone: UTC+01 (CET)
  - Summer (DST): UTC+02 (CEST)
- Website: www.razkrizje.si

The Municipality of Razkrižje (pronounced [ˈɾaːskɾiʒjɛ]; Slovene: Občina Razkrižje) is a small municipality in Slovenia. The seat of the municipality is the town of Razkrižje. It was part of Zala County in the Kingdom of Hungary. It is now included in the Mura Statistical Region. It borders Croatia.

== Settlements ==
In addition to the municipal seat of Razkrižje, the municipality also includes the following settlements:

- Gibina
- Kopriva
- Šafarsko
- Šprinc
- Veščica
