= Kopriva, Razkrižje =

Kopriva
- Location in Slovenia
- Coordinates: 46°30′37.52″N 16°15′52.4″E
- Country: Slovenia
- Traditional region: Styria
- Statistical region: Mura
- Municipality: Razkrižje

Area
  - Total: 0.44 km^{2} (0.17 sq mi)
- Elevation: 251.5 m (825 ft)

Population (2002)
  - Total: 19

Kopriva (pronounced [kɔˈpɾiːʋa]) is a small settlement in the Municipality of Razkrižje in eastern Slovenia, next to the border with Croatia. The area is part of the traditional region of Styria and is now included in the Mura Statistical Region.
