= Zgornja Hajdina =

- Location in Slovenia
- Coordinates: 46°24′20.38″N 15°50′18.65″E
- Country: Slovenia
- Traditional region: Styria
- Statistical region: Drava
- Municipality: Hajdina

Area
  - Total: 5.12 km^{2} (1.98 sq mi)
- Elevation: 229.8 m (754 ft)

Population (2002)
  - Total: 804

Zgornja Hajdina (pronounced [ˈzɡoːɾnja xai̯ˈdiːna]) is a settlement and the administrative centre of the Municipality of Hajdina in northeastern Slovenia. The area is part of the traditional region of Styria. It is now included with the rest of the municipality in the Drava Statistical Region.

The parish church in the settlement is dedicated to Saint Martin and belongs to the Roman Catholic Archdiocese of Maribor. It is a late 14th-century church that was greatly expanded in a rebuilding in 1874.

A number of archaeological sites close to the settlement show that the area has been settled since prehistory. Of particular interest are the finds associated with the nearby Roman town of Poetovio.
