= Ravno, Dobje =

Ravno
- Location in Slovenia
- Coordinates: 46°7′55.5″N 15°24′12.2″E
- Country: Slovenia
- Traditional region: Styria
- Statistical region: Savinja
- Municipality: Dobje

Area
  - Total: 1.28 km^{2} (0.49 sq mi)
- Elevation: 522.7 m (1,715 ft)

Population (2020)
  - Total: 65
  - Density: 51/km^{2} (130/sq mi)
- Postal code: 3224

Ravno (pronounced [ˈɾaːu̯nɔ]) is a small village in the Municipality of Dobje in eastern Slovenia. The area is part of the traditional region of Styria and is now included with the rest of the municipality in the Savinja Statistical Region.
