= Gibina, Sveti Andraž v Slovenskih Goricah =

Gibina
- Location in Slovenia
- Coordinates: 46°31′41.26″N 15°59′36.38″E
- Country: Slovenia
- Traditional region: Styria
- Statistical region: Drava
- Municipality: Sveti Andraž v Slovenskih Goricah

Area
  - Total: 1.98 km^{2} (0.76 sq mi)
- Elevation: 292.7 m (960 ft)

Population (2002)
  - Total: 85

Gibina (pronounced [ˈɡiːbina]) is a settlement in the Slovene Hills in northeastern Slovenia. It lies in the Municipality of Sveti Andraž v Slovenskih Goricah. The area is part of the traditional region of Styria. It is now included with the rest of the municipality in the Drava Statistical Region.
