= Župetinci =

- Location in Slovenia
- Coordinates: 46°32′19.7″N 15°57′15.8″E
- Country: Slovenia
- Traditional region: Styria
- Statistical region: Drava
- Municipality: Cerkvenjak

Area
  - Total: 2.5 km^{2} (0.97 sq mi)
- Elevation: 243.9 m (800 ft)

Population (2020)
  - Total: 173
  - Density: 69/km^{2} (180/sq mi)

Župetinci (pronounced [ˈʒuːpɛtintsi]) is a settlement in the Municipality of Cerkvenjak in northeastern Slovenia. It lies in the Slovene Hills (Slovene: Slovenske gorice) in the valley of Župetinci Creek (Župetinski potok), a minor left tributary of the Pesnica River. The area is part of the traditional region of Styria and is now included in the Drava Statistical Region.
