= Municipality of Cerkvenjak =

Municipality of Slovenia

Municipality of Cerkvenjak Občina Cerkvenjak
- Municipality
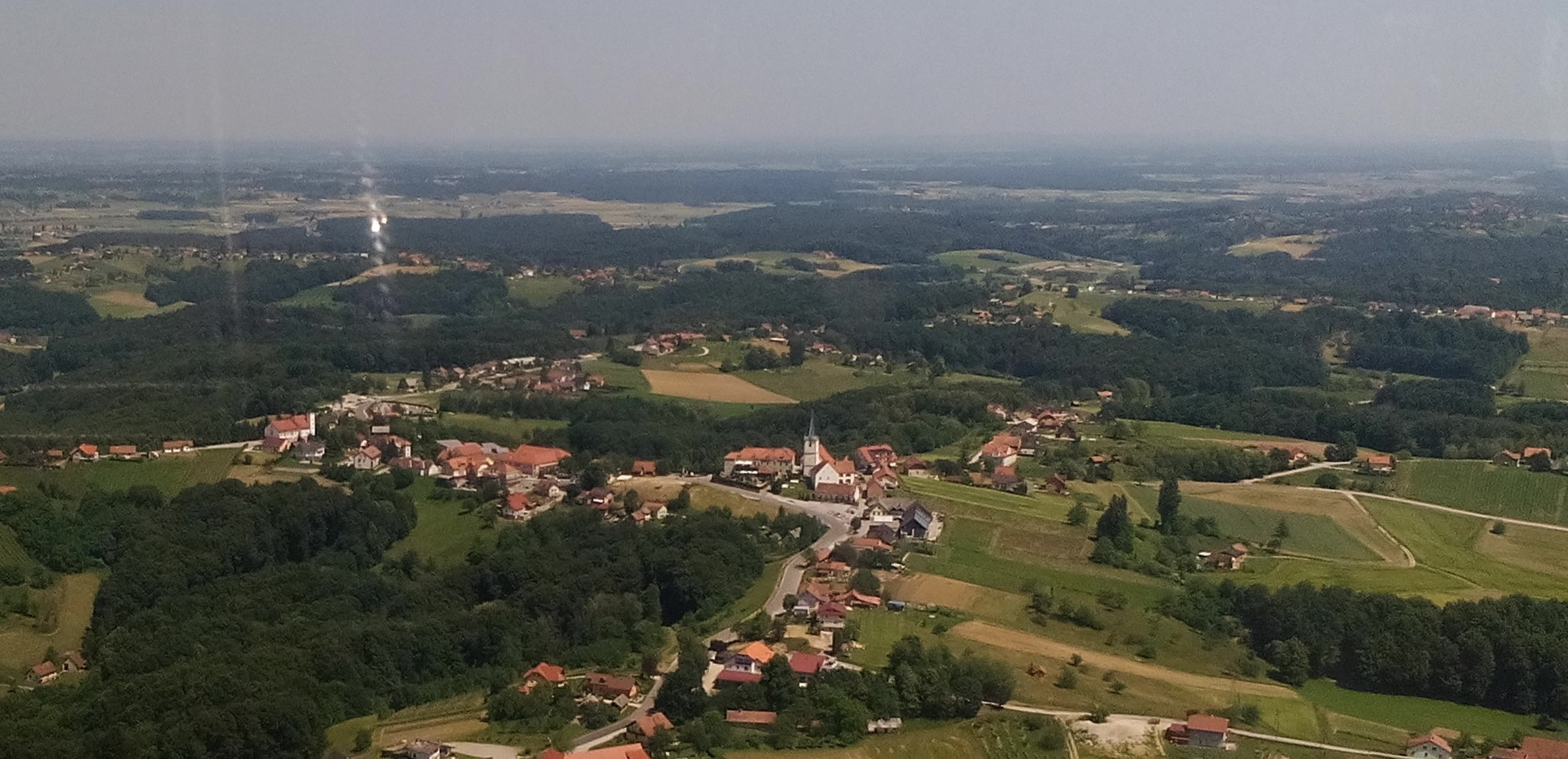

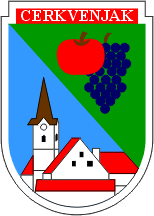
- Coat of arms

- Location of the Municipality of Cerkvenjak in Slovenia
- Coordinates: 46°34′N 15°57′E
- Country: Slovenia

Government
  - Mayor: Marjan Žmavc (SDS)

Area
  - Total: 23.0 km^{2} (8.9 sq mi)

Population (June 2009)
  - Total: 2,037
  - Density: 88.6/km^{2} (229/sq mi)
- Time zone: UTC+01 (CET)
  - Summer (DST): UTC+02 (CEST)
- Website: www.cerkvenjak.si

The Municipality of Cerkvenjak (pronounced [tsɛɾkʋɛˈnjaːk]; Slovene: Občina Cerkvenjak) is a municipality in northeastern Slovenia. The seat of the municipality is the settlement of Cerkvenjak. The municipality lies in the Slovene Hills (Slovene: Slovenske gorice) in the region known as Prlekija. The area is part of the traditional region of Lower Styria. The municipality is now included in the Drava Statistical Region.

== Settlements ==
In addition to the municipal seat of Cerkvenjak, the municipality also includes the following settlements:

- Andrenci
- Brengova
- Čagona
- Cenkova
- Cogetinci
- Grabonoški Vrh
- Ivanjski Vrh
- Kadrenci
- Komarnica
- Peščeni Vrh
- Smolinci
- Stanetinci
- Vanetina
- Župetinci
