= Municipality of Sveti Andraž v Slovenskih Goricah =

Municipality of Slovenia

Municipality of Sveti Andraž v Slovenskih Goricah Občina Sveti Andraž v Slovenskih goricah
- Municipality
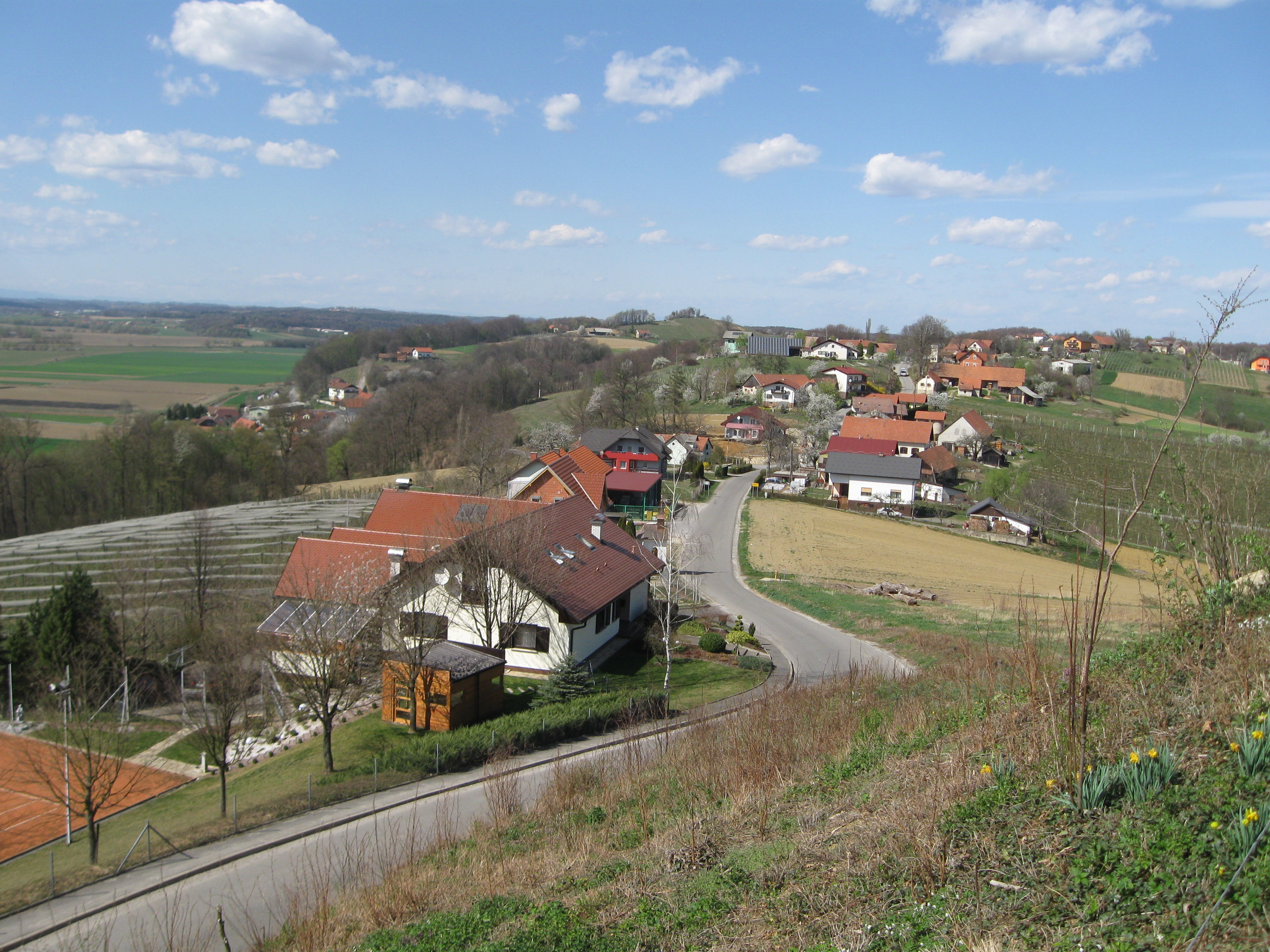

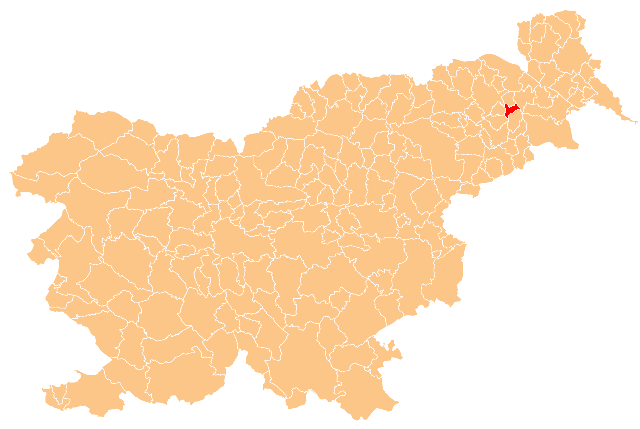
- Location of the Municipality of Sveti Andraž v Slovenskih Goricah in Slovenia
- Coordinates: 46°31′N 15°58′E
- Country: Slovenia

Government
  - Mayor: Darja Vudler

Area
  - Total: 17.6 km^{2} (6.8 sq mi)

Population (2017)
  - Total: 1,143
  - Density: 64.9/km^{2} (168/sq mi)
- Time zone: UTC+01 (CET)
  - Summer (DST): UTC+02 (CEST)
- Website: www.sv-andraz.si

The Municipality of Sveti Andraž v Slovenskih Goricah (pronounced [ˈsʋeːti anˈdɾaːʃ ʍ slɔˈʋeːnskiɣ ɡɔˈɾiːtsax]; Slovene: Občina Sveti Andraž v Slovenskih goricah) is a small municipality in northeastern Slovenia. It lies in the Slovene Hills. The administrative centre of the municipality is the village of Vitomarci. The area is part of the traditional region of Styria. The municipality is now included in the Drava Statistical Region.

Until 1995 it was part of the Municipality of Ptuj and was then included in the Municipality of Destrnik–Trnovska Vas. It became an independent municipality in 1998.

== Settlements ==
The municipality includes the following settlements:

- Drbetinci
- Gibina
- Hvaletinci
- Novinci
- Rjavci
- Slavšina
- Vitomarci
