= Gibina, Razkrižje =

Village in eastern Slovenia

Gibina
- Location in Slovenia
- Coordinates: 46°31′12.65″N 16°18′2.72″E
- Country: Slovenia
- Traditional region: Međimurje, Zala County
- Statistical region: Mura
- Municipality: Razkrižje

Area
  - Total: 1.5 km^{2} (0.58 sq mi)
- Elevation: 174.4 m (572 ft)

Population (2002)
  - Total: 232

Gibina (pronounced [ˈɡiːbina]) is a village on the right bank of the Mura River in the Municipality of Razkrižje in eastern Slovenia. The area traditionally belonged to Zala County in the Kingdom of Hungary and is now included in the Mura Statistical Region.

There is a small chapel with a belfry in the centre of the village. It was built in 1924 and renovated in 1994.
