= Cerkvenjak =

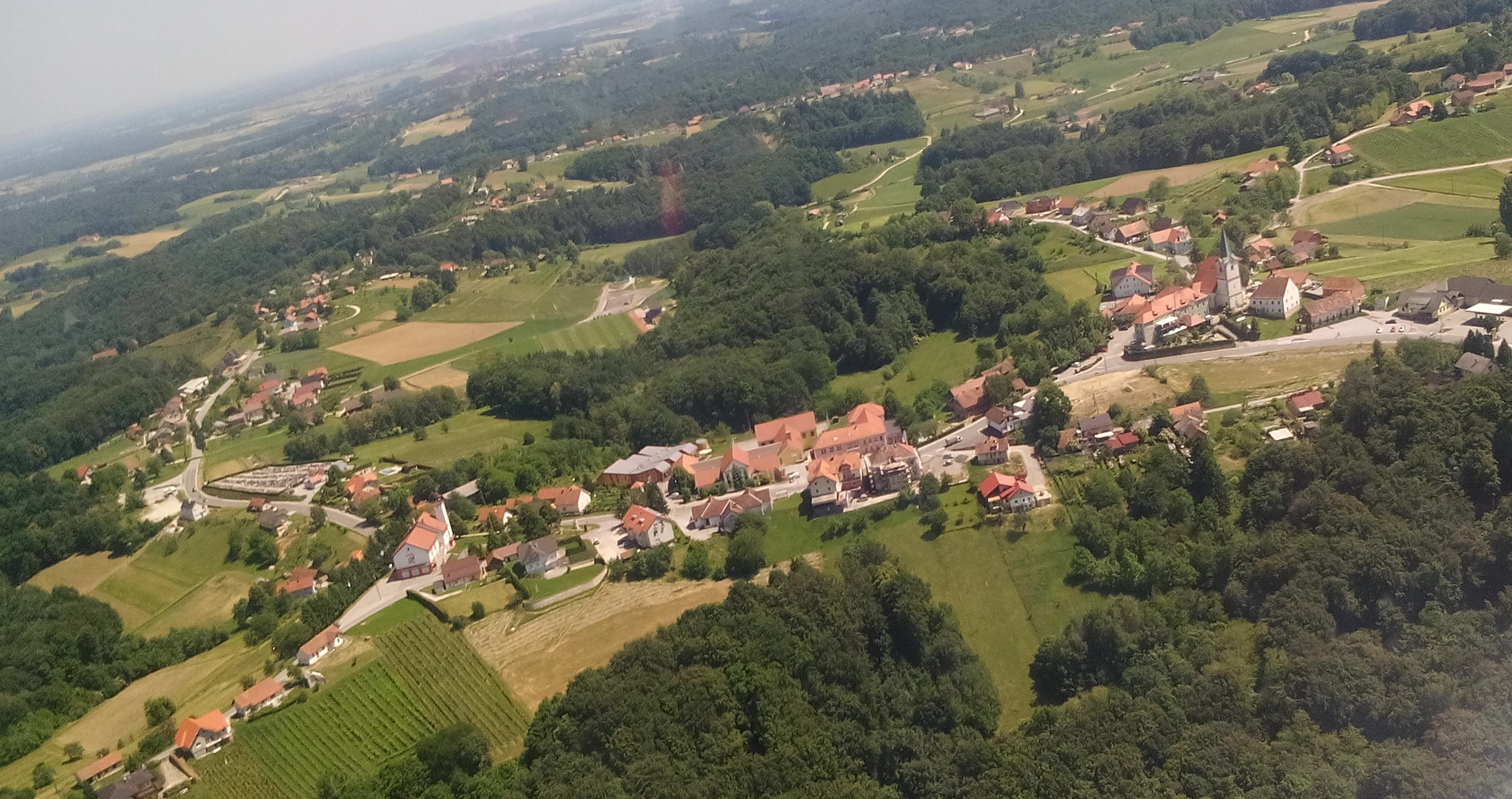

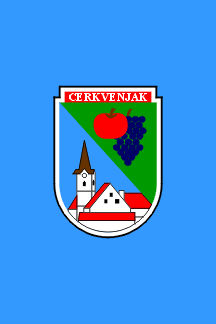
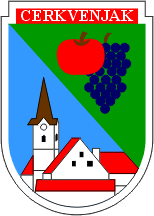
- Flag Coat of arms

- Location in Slovenia
- Coordinates: 46°33′57.54″N 15°56′34.32″E
- Country: Slovenia
- Traditional region: Styria
- Statistical region: Drava
- Municipality: Cerkvenjak

Area
  - Total: 0.7 km^{2} (0.27 sq mi)
- Elevation: 339.8 m (1,115 ft)

Population (2020)
  - Total: 163
- Postal code: 2236 Cerkvenjak

Cerkvenjak (pronounced [tsɛɾkʋɛˈnjaːk], German: Kirchberg) is a settlement in the Municipality of Cerkvenjak in northeastern Slovenia. It is the seat of the municipality. It lies in the Slovene Hills (Slovene: Slovenske gorice) in sub-region called Prlekija. The area is part of the traditional region of Styria. The municipality is now included in the Drava Statistical Region.

The local parish church is dedicated to Saint Anthony the Hermit and is the seat of the Parish of Sveti Anton v Slovenskih Goricah. It belongs to the Roman Catholic Archdiocese of Maribor. It was built in 1546 on the site of an earlier building. The actual pastor of Cervenjak is Aleks Kozar.
