= Vitomarci =

- Location in Slovenia
- Coordinates: 46°31′29.12″N 15°56′4.53″E
- Country: Slovenia
- Traditional region: Styria
- Statistical region: Drava
- Municipality: Sveti Andraž v Slovenskih Goricah

Area
  - Total: 4.49 km^{2} (1.73 sq mi)
- Elevation: 295.7 m (970 ft)

Population (2002)
  - Total: 341

Vitomarci (pronounced [ˈʋiːtɔmaɾtsi]) is a settlement in and the administrative centre of the Municipality of Sveti Andraž v Slovenskih Goricah in northeastern Slovenia. It lies in the foothills of the Slovene Hills on the left bank of the Pesnica River. The area is part of the traditional region of Styria. It is now included with the rest of the municipality in the Drava Statistical Region.

The parish church in the settlement, from which the municipality gets its name, is dedicated to Saint Andrew (sveti Andraž in the local dialect) and belongs to the Roman Catholic Archdiocese of Maribor. It dates to the early 16th century.
