= Presečno, Dobje =

Presečno
- Location in Slovenia
- Coordinates: 46°8′10.04″N 15°25′49.68″E
- Country: Slovenia
- Traditional region: Styria
- Statistical region: Savinja
- Municipality: Dobje

Area
  - Total: 2.21 km^{2} (0.85 sq mi)
- Elevation: 587.8 m (1,928 ft)

Population (2020)
  - Total: 89
  - Density: 40/km^{2} (100/sq mi)
- Postal code: 3224

Presečno (pronounced [pɾɛˈseːtʃnɔ], in older sources also Presično, German: Presitschno) is a settlement in the Municipality of Dobje in eastern Slovenia. The area is part of the traditional region of Styria. It is now included in the Savinja Statistical Region.
