= Dobje pri Planini =

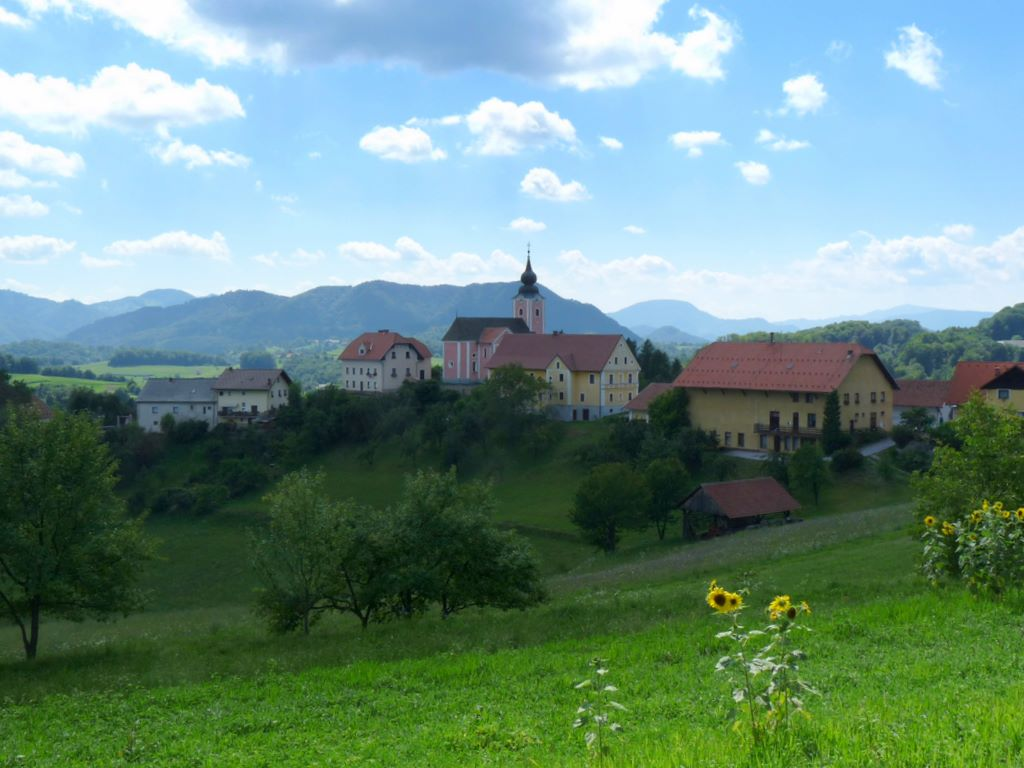

- Location in Slovenia
- Coordinates: 46°8′12.78″N 15°23′40.17″E
- Country: Slovenia
- Traditional region: Styria
- Statistical region: Savinja
- Municipality: Dobje
- Elevation: 560 m (1,840 ft)

Population (2020)
  - Total: 114
- Postal code: 3224

Dobje pri Planini (pronounced [ˈdoːbjɛ pɾi plaˈniːni]) is a settlement in the Municipality of Dobje in eastern Slovenia. It is the administrative center of the municipality. It is part of the traditional region of Styria. It is now included with the rest of the municipality in the Savinja Statistical Region. It has its own primary school and post office.

== Name ==
The name of the settlement was changed from Dobje to Dobje pri Planini in 1953.

== Church ==
The parish church in the settlement is dedicated to the Virgin Mary and belongs to the Roman Catholic Diocese of Celje. It was first mentioned in written documents dating to 1545, but was extensively rebuilt in the 18th and 19th centuries.

== Notable people ==
Notable people that were born in Dobje pri Planini include:

- Jože Brilej (1910–1981), communist political commissar and Yugoslav politician
