= Municipalities of Slovenia =

Slovenia divided into municipalities (as of 2011)

Slovenia is divided into 212 municipalities (Slovene: občine, singular – občina), of which 12 have urban (metropolitan) status. Municipalities are further divided into local communities and districts. Slovenia has the largest number of first-level administrative divisions of any country.

== Overview ==
The municipalities vary considerably in size and population, from the capital Ljubljana with more than 280,000 inhabitants to Hodoš with fewer than 400.

Urban (sometimes also translated as 'civil' or 'city') municipality status is not granted strictly on the basis of population; the smallest urban municipality, Slovenj Gradec, has less than half as many inhabitants as the most populous non-urban municipality, Domžale. Instead, the criterion is whether a municipality serves as a metropolitan center for adjoining municipalities, which Domžale (as a suburb of Ljubljana) does not.

Slovene is the official language in all municipalities. Hungarian is the second official language of three municipalities in Prekmurje: Dobrovnik/Dobronak, Hodoš/Hodos, and Lendava/Lendva. Italian is the second official language of four municipalities (of which one has urban status) in the Slovene Littoral: Ankaran/Ancarano, Izola/Isola, Koper/Capodistria, and Piran/Pirano.

For EU statistical purposes, Slovenian municipalities are classified as "local administrative unit 2" (LAU 2), below the country's 58 administrative units (upravne enote), which are classified LAU 1.

=== Subdivisions ===
By municipal statute, a municipality may be divided into krajevna skupnosti (local communities) and assigned certain municipal tasks within the boundaries of the local community such a spatial planning, management of municipally owned property by use of the local community, road construction and maintenance, and other local services. A local community that covers territory in an urban area is called a četrtna skupnost (neighborhood community) or mestna četrt (city district). A local community has a directly elected committee, which elects its own president, secretary and treasurer from amongst its own members.

== Names ==
The Slovene names of the municipalities as territorial/administrative units have the word občina 'municipality', followed by a nominative form, usually the seat of the municipality; for example, Občina Ajdovščina 'Municipality of Ajdovščina'. The word občina should be capitalised as Občina when it refers to the official designation of the community or the legal person representing the community, whereas it should be uncapitalised if it is meant as a generic term. For the urban municipalities, the term used is mestna občina (generic name) or Mestna občina (proper name).

== List of Slovenian municipalities ==
Slovenia is divided into 212 municipalities, 12 of which have urban status. Those with urban status are bold.

ISO 3166-2 code	English name	Slovene name	Seat	Population (2013)	Separated from
SI-001	Municipality of Ajdovščina	Občina Ajdovščina	Ajdovščina	18,955	
SI-213	Municipality of Ankaran	Občina Ankaran	Ankaran	3,239	Koper, 2015
SI-195	Municipality of Apače	Občina Apače	Apače	3,610	Gornja Radgona, 2007
SI-002	Municipality of Beltinci	Občina Beltinci	Beltinci	8,302	
SI-148	Municipality of Benedikt	Občina Benedikt	Benedikt	2,430	Lenart, 1999
SI-149	Municipality of Bistrica ob Sotli	Občina Bistrica ob Sotli	Bistrica ob Sotli	1,404	Podčetrtek, 1999
SI-003	Municipality of Bled	Občina Bled	Bled	8,171	
SI-150	Municipality of Bloke	Občina Bloke	Nova Vas	1,584	Loška Dolina, 1999
SI-004	Municipality of Bohinj	Občina Bohinj	Bohinjska Bistrica	5,206	
SI-005	Municipality of Borovnica	Občina Borovnica	Borovnica	3,992	
SI-006	Municipality of Bovec	Občina Bovec	Bovec	3,195	
SI-151	Municipality of Braslovče	Občina Braslovče	Braslovče	5,409	Žalec, 1999
SI-007	Municipality of Brda	Občina Brda	Dobrovo	5,734	
SI-008	Municipality of Brezovica	Občina Brezovica	Brezovica pri Ljubljani	11,620	
SI-009	Municipality of Brežice	Občina Brežice	Brežice	24,285	
SI-152	Municipality of Cankova	Občina Cankova	Cankova	1,889	Cankova–Tišina, 1999
SI-011	Urban Municipality of Celje	Mestna občina Celje	Celje	48,675	
SI-012	Municipality of Cerklje na Gorenjskem	Občina Cerklje na Gorenjskem	Cerklje na Gorenjskem	7,243	
SI-013	Municipality of Cerknica	Občina Cerknica	Cerknica	11,268	
SI-014	Municipality of Cerkno	Občina Cerkno	Cerkno	4,786	
SI-153	Municipality of Cerkvenjak	Občina Cerkvenjak	Cerkvenjak	2,009	Lenart, 1999
SI-196	Municipality of Cirkulane	Občina Cirkulane	Cirkulane	2,312	Gorišnica, 2007
SI-015	Municipality of Črenšovci	Občina Črenšovci	Črenšovci	4,052	
SI-016	Municipality of Črna na Koroškem	Občina Črna na Koroškem	Črna na Koroškem	3,473	
SI-017	Municipality of Črnomelj	Občina Črnomelj	Črnomelj	14,629	
SI-018	Municipality of Destrnik	Občina Destrnik	Destrnik	2,582	(named Destrnik–Trnovska Vas until 1999)
SI-019	Municipality of Divača	Občina Divača	Divača	3,896	
SI-154	Municipality of Dobje	Občina Dobje	Dobje pri Planini	968	Šentjur, 1999
SI-020	Municipality of Dobrepolje	Občina Dobrepolje	Videm	3,938	
SI-155	Municipality of Dobrna	Občina Dobrna	Dobrna	2,195	Vojnik, 1999
SI-021	Municipality of Dobrova–Polhov Gradec	Občina Dobrova - Polhov Gradec	Dobrova	7,539	(named Dobrova–Horjul–Polhov Gradec until 1999)
SI-156	Municipality of Dobrovnik	Občina Dobrovnik	Dobrovnik	1,319	Lendava, 1999
SI-022	Municipality of Dol pri Ljubljani	Občina Dol pri Ljubljani	Dol pri Ljubljani	5,666	
SI-157	Municipality of Dolenjske Toplice	Občina Dolenjske Toplice	Dolenjske Toplice	3,398	Novo Mesto, 1999
SI-023	Municipality of Domžale	Občina Domžale	Domžale	34,455	
SI-024	Municipality of Dornava	Občina Dornava	Dornava	2,907	
SI-025	Municipality of Dravograd	Občina Dravograd	Dravograd	8,989	
SI-026	Municipality of Duplek	Občina Duplek	Spodnji Duplek	6,746	
SI-027	Municipality of Gorenja Vas–Poljane	Občina Gorenja vas - Poljane	Gorenja Vas	7,307	
SI-028	Municipality of Gorišnica	Občina Gorišnica	Gorišnica	4,035	
SI-207	Municipality of Gorje	Občina Gorje	Zgornje Gorje	2,874	Bled, 2007
SI-029	Municipality of Gornja Radgona	Občina Gornja Radgona	Gornja Radgona	8,576	
SI-030	Municipality of Gornji Grad	Občina Gornji Grad	Gornji Grad	2,650	
SI-031	Municipality of Gornji Petrovci	Občina Gornji Petrovci	Gornji Petrovci	2,136	
SI-158	Municipality of Grad	Občina Grad	Grad	2,216	Kuzma, 1999
SI-032	Municipality of Grosuplje	Občina Grosuplje	Grosuplje	19,719	
SI-159	Municipality of Hajdina	Občina Hajdina	Zgornja Hajdina	3,736	Ptuj, 1999
SI-160	Municipality of Hoče-Slivnica	Občina Hoče - Slivnica	Spodnje Hoče	11,189	Maribor, 1999
SI-161	Municipality of Hodoš	Občina Hodoš	Hodoš	375	Hodoš–Šalovci, 1999
SI-162	Municipality of Horjul	Občina Horjul	Horjul	2,909	Dobrova–Horjul–Polhov Gradec, 1999
SI-034	Municipality of Hrastnik	Občina Hrastnik	Hrastnik	9,713	
SI-035	Municipality of Hrpelje-Kozina	Občina Hrpelje - Kozina	Hrpelje	4,303	
SI-036	Municipality of Idrija	Občina Idrija	Idrija	11,938	
SI-037	Municipality of Ig	Občina Ig	Ig	7,016	
SI-038	Municipality of Ilirska Bistrica	Občina Ilirska Bistrica	Ilirska Bistrica	13,866	
SI-039	Municipality of Ivančna Gorica	Občina Ivančna Gorica	Ivančna Gorica	15,810	
SI-040	Municipality of Izola	Občina Izola	Izola	15,952	
SI-041	Municipality of Jesenice	Občina Jesenice	Jesenice	21,374	
SI-163	Municipality of Jezersko	Občina Jezersko	Zgornje Jezersko	634	Preddvor, 1999
SI-042	Municipality of Juršinci	Občina Juršinci	Juršinci	2,388	
SI-043	Municipality of Kamnik	Občina Kamnik	Kamnik	29,244	
SI-044	Municipality of Kanal ob Soči	Občina Kanal ob Soči	Kanal	5,644	
SI-045	Municipality of Kidričevo	Občina Kidričevo	Kidričevo	6,627	
SI-046	Municipality of Kobarid	Občina Kobarid	Kobarid	4,189	
SI-047	Municipality of Kobilje	Občina Kobilje	Kobilje	590	Lendava, 1994
SI-048	Municipality of Kočevje	Občina Kočevje	Kočevje	16,379	
SI-049	Municipality of Komen	Občina Komen	Komen	3,545	
SI-164	Municipality of Komenda	Občina Komenda	Komenda	5,746	Kamnik, 1999
SI-050	Urban Municipality of Koper	Mestna občina Koper	Koper	51,048	
SI-197	Municipality of Kostanjevica na Krki	Občina Kostanjevica na Krki	Kostanjevica na Krki	2,416	Krško, 2007
SI-165	Municipality of Kostel	Občina Kostel	Vas	644	Kočevje, 1999
SI-051	Municipality of Kozje	Občina Kozje	Kozje	3,177	
SI-052	Urban Municipality of Kranj	Mestna občina Kranj	Kranj	55,527	
SI-053	Municipality of Kranjska Gora	Občina Kranjska Gora	Kranjska Gora	5,324	
SI-166	Municipality of Križevci	Občina Križevci	Križevci pri Ljutomeru	3,753	Ljutomer, 1999
SI-054	Urban Municipality of Krško	Mestna občina Krško	Krško	26,050	
SI-055	Municipality of Kungota	Občina Kungota	Zgornja Kungota	4,787	
SI-056	Municipality of Kuzma	Občina Kuzma	Kuzma	1,584	
SI-057	Municipality of Laško	Občina Laško	Laško	13,409	
SI-058	Municipality of Lenart	Občina Lenart	Lenart v Slovenskih Goricah	8,169	
SI-059	Municipality of Lendava	Občina Lendava	Lendava	10,721	
SI-060	Municipality of Litija	Občina Litija	Litija	15,017	
SI-061	Urban Municipality of Ljubljana	Mestna občina Ljubljana	Ljubljana	282,994	
SI-062	Municipality of Ljubno	Občina Ljubno	Ljubno ob Savinji	2,645	
SI-063	Municipality of Ljutomer	Občina Ljutomer	Ljutomer	11,662	
SI-208	Municipality of Log-Dragomer	Občina Log - Dragomer	Log pri Brezovici	3,660	Vrhnika, 2007
SI-064	Municipality of Logatec	Občina Logatec	Logatec	13,694	
SI-065	Municipality of Loška Dolina	Občina Loška dolina	Stari Trg pri Ložu	3,871	
SI-066	Municipality of Loški Potok	Občina Loški Potok	Hrib–Loški Potok	1,932	
SI-167	Municipality of Lovrenc na Pohorju	Občina Lovrenc na Pohorju	Lovrenc na Pohorju	3,096	Ruše, 1999
SI-067	Municipality of Luče	Občina Luče	Luče	1,514	
SI-068	Municipality of Lukovica	Občina Lukovica	Lukovica pri Domžalah	5,549	
SI-069	Municipality of Majšperk	Občina Majšperk	Majšperk	3,980	
SI-198	Municipality of Makole	Občina Makole	Makole	2,037	Slovenska Bistrica, 2007
SI-070	Urban Municipality of Maribor	Mestna občina Maribor	Maribor	111,374	
SI-168	Municipality of Markovci	Občina Markovci	Markovci	4,015	Ptuj, 1999
SI-071	Municipality of Medvode	Občina Medvode	Medvode	15,843	
SI-072	Municipality of Mengeš	Občina Mengeš	Mengeš	7,477	
SI-073	Municipality of Metlika	Občina Metlika	Metlika	8,373	
SI-074	Municipality of Mežica	Občina Mežica	Mežica	3,632	
SI-169	Municipality of Miklavž na Dravskem Polju	Občina Miklavž na Dravskem polju	Miklavž na Dravskem Polju	6,402	Maribor, 1999
SI-075	Municipality of Miren-Kostanjevica	Občina Miren - Kostanjevica	Miren	4,835	
SI-212	Municipality of Mirna	Občina Mirna	Mirna	2,577	Trebnje, 2012
SI-170	Municipality of Mirna Peč	Občina Mirna Peč	Mirna Peč	2,846	Novo Mesto, 1999
SI-076	Municipality of Mislinja	Občina Mislinja	Mislinja	4,666	
SI-199	Municipality of Mokronog-Trebelno	Občina Mokronog - Trebelno	Mokronog	2,981	Trebnje, 2007
SI-077	Municipality of Moravče	Občina Moravče	Moravče	5,129	
SI-078	Municipality of Moravske Toplice	Občina Moravske Toplice	Moravske Toplice	5,908	
SI-079	Municipality of Mozirje	Občina Mozirje	Mozirje	4,098	
SI-080	Urban Municipality of Murska Sobota	Mestna občina Murska Sobota	Murska Sobota	19,188	
SI-081	Municipality of Muta	Občina Muta	Muta	3,457	
SI-082	Municipality of Naklo	Občina Naklo	Naklo	5,337	
SI-083	Municipality of Nazarje	Občina Nazarje	Nazarje	2,624	
SI-084	Urban Municipality of Nova Gorica	Mestna občina Nova Gorica	Nova Gorica	31,938	
SI-085	Urban Municipality of Novo Mesto	Mestna občina Novo mesto	Novo Mesto	36,285	
SI-086	Municipality of Odranci	Občina Odranci	Odranci	1,637	
SI-171	Municipality of Oplotnica	Občina Oplotnica	Oplotnica	4,029	Slovenska Bistrica, 1999
SI-087	Municipality of Ormož	Občina Ormož	Ormož	12,526	
SI-088	Municipality of Osilnica	Občina Osilnica	Osilnica	396	
SI-089	Municipality of Pesnica	Občina Pesnica	Pesnica pri Mariboru	7,554	
SI-090	Municipality of Piran	Občina Piran	Piran	17,882	
SI-091	Municipality of Pivka	Občina Pivka	Pivka	6,044	
SI-092	Municipality of Podčetrtek	Občina Podčetrtek	Podčetrtek	3,322	
SI-172	Municipality of Podlehnik	Občina Podlehnik	Podlehnik	1,873	Videm, 1999
SI-093	Municipality of Podvelka	Občina Podvelka	Podvelka	2,500	(named Podvelka–Ribnica until 1999)
SI-200	Municipality of Poljčane	Občina Poljčane	Poljčane	4,556	Slovenska Bistrica, 2007
SI-173	Municipality of Polzela	Občina Polzela	Polzela	5,995	Žalec, 1999
SI-094	Municipality of Postojna	Občina Postojna	Postojna	15,749	
SI-174	Municipality of Prebold	Občina Prebold	Prebold	5,052	Žalec, 1999
SI-095	Municipality of Preddvor	Občina Preddvor	Preddvor	3,561	
SI-175	Municipality of Prevalje	Občina Prevalje	Prevalje	6,814	Ravne–Prevalje, 1999
SI-096	Urban Municipality of Ptuj	Mestna občina Ptuj	Ptuj	23,404	
SI-097	Municipality of Puconci	Občina Puconci	Puconci	6,098	
SI-098	Municipality of Rače-Fram	Občina Rače - Fram	Rače	7,021	
SI-099	Municipality of Radeče	Občina Radeče	Radeče	4,396	
SI-100	Municipality of Radenci	Občina Radenci	Radenci	5,252	
SI-101	Municipality of Radlje ob Dravi	Občina Radlje ob Dravi	Radlje ob Dravi	6,311	
SI-102	Municipality of Radovljica	Občina Radovljica	Radovljica	18,870	
SI-103	Municipality of Ravne na Koroškem	Občina Ravne na Koroškem	Ravne na Koroškem	11,464	(named Ravne–Prevalje until 1999)
SI-176	Municipality of Razkrižje	Občina Razkrižje	Razkrižje	1,335	Ljutomer, 1999
SI-209	Municipality of Rečica ob Savinji	Občina Rečica ob Savinji	Rečica ob Savinji	2,306	Mozirje, 2007
SI-201	Municipality of Renče–Vogrsko	Občina Renče - Vogrsko	Bukovica	4,309	Nova Gorica, 2007
SI-104	Municipality of Ribnica	Občina Ribnica	Ribnica	9,316	
SI-177	Municipality of Ribnica na Pohorju	Občina Ribnica na Pohorju	Ribnica na Pohorju	1,198	Podvelka–Ribnica, 1999
SI-106	Municipality of Rogaška Slatina	Občina Rogaška Slatina	Rogaška Slatina	11,070	
SI-105	Municipality of Rogašovci	Občina Rogašovci	Rogašovci	3,178	(name correction: Rogaševci until 1999)
SI-107	Municipality of Rogatec	Občina Rogatec	Rogatec	3,122	
SI-108	Municipality of Ruše	Občina Ruše	Ruše	7,220	
SI-033	Municipality of Šalovci	Občina Šalovci	Šalovci	1,521	(named Hodoš-Šalovci until 1999)
SI-178	Municipality of Selnica ob Dravi	Občina Selnica ob Dravi	Selnica ob Dravi	4,532	Ruše, 1999
SI-109	Municipality of Semič	Občina Semič	Semič	3,832	
SI-183	Municipality of Šempeter-Vrtojba	Občina Šempeter - Vrtojba	Šempeter pri Gorici	6,348	Nova Gorica, 1999
SI-117	Municipality of Šenčur	Občina Šenčur	Šenčur	8,469	
SI-118	Municipality of Šentilj	Občina Šentilj	Šentilj v Slovenskih Goricah	8,467	
SI-119	Municipality of Šentjernej	Občina Šentjernej	Šentjernej	6,908	
SI-120	Municipality of Šentjur	Občina Šentjur	Šentjur	18,946	
SI-211	Municipality of Šentrupert	Občina Šentrupert	Šentrupert	2,845	Trebnje, 2007
SI-110	Municipality of Sevnica	Občina Sevnica	Sevnica	17,460	
SI-111	Municipality of Sežana	Občina Sežana	Sežana	13,036	
SI-121	Municipality of Škocjan	Občina Škocjan	Škocjan	3,224	
SI-122	Municipality of Škofja Loka	Občina Škofja Loka	Škofja Loka	22,901	
SI-123	Municipality of Škofljica	Občina Škofljica	Škofljica	9,744	
SI-112	Urban Municipality of Slovenj Gradec	Mestna občina Slovenj Gradec	Slovenj Gradec	16,870	
SI-113	Municipality of Slovenska Bistrica	Občina Slovenska Bistrica	Slovenska Bistrica	25,191	
SI-114	Municipality of Slovenske Konjice	Občina Slovenske Konjice	Slovenske Konjice	14,438	
SI-124	Municipality of Šmarje pri Jelšah	Občina Šmarje pri Jelšah	Šmarje pri Jelšah	10,278	
SI-206	Municipality of Šmarješke Toplice	Občina Šmarješke Toplice	Šmarješke Toplice	3,224	Novo Mesto, 2007
SI-125	Municipality of Šmartno ob Paki	Občina Šmartno ob Paki	Šmartno ob Paki	3,218	
SI-194	Municipality of Šmartno pri Litiji	Občina Šmartno pri Litiji	Šmartno pri Litiji	5,522	Litija, 2002
SI-179	Municipality of Sodražica	Občina Sodražica	Sodražica	2,187	Ribnica, 1999
SI-180	Municipality of Solčava	Občina Solčava	Solčava	518	Luče, 1999
SI-126	Municipality of Šoštanj	Občina Šoštanj	Šoštanj	8,750	
SI-202	Municipality of Središče ob Dravi	Občina Središče ob Dravi	Središče ob Dravi	2,110	Ormož, 2007
SI-115	Municipality of Starše	Občina Starše	Starše	4,102	
SI-127	Municipality of Štore	Občina Štore	Štore	4,292	
SI-203	Municipality of Straža	Občina Straža	Straža	3,890	Novo Mesto, 2007
SI-181	Municipality of Sveta Ana	Občina Sveta Ana	Sveta Ana v Slovenskih Goricah	2,342	Lenart, 1999
SI-204	Municipality of Sveta Trojica v Slovenskih Goricah	Občina Sveta Trojica v Slovenskih goricah	Sveta Trojica v Slovenskih Goricah	2,100	Lenart, 2007
SI-182	Municipality of Sveti Andraž v Slovenskih Goricah	Občina Sveti Andraž v Slovenskih goricah	Vitomarci	1,138	Destrnik–Trnovska Vas, 1999
SI-116	Municipality of Sveti Jurij ob Ščavnici	Občina Sveti Jurij ob Ščavnici	Sveti Jurij ob Ščavnici	2,890	
SI-210	Municipality of Sveti Jurij v Slovenskih Goricah	Občina Sveti Jurij v Slovenskih goricah	Jurovski Dol	2,109	Lenart, 2007
SI-205	Municipality of Sveti Tomaž	Občina Sveti Tomaž	Sveti Tomaž	2,112	Ormož, 2007
SI-184	Municipality of Tabor	Občina Tabor	Tabor	1,603	Žalec, 1999
SI-010	Municipality of Tišina	Občina Tišina	Tišina	4,124	(named Cankova–Tišina until 1999)
SI-128	Municipality of Tolmin	Občina Tolmin	Tolmin	11,578	
SI-129	Municipality of Trbovlje	Občina Trbovlje	Trbovlje	16,888	
SI-130	Municipality of Trebnje	Občina Trebnje	Trebnje	12,075	
SI-185	Municipality of Trnovska Vas	Občina Trnovska vas	Trnovska Vas	1,348	Destrnik–Trnovska Vas, 1999
SI-186	Municipality of Trzin	Občina Trzin	Trzin	3,874	Domžale, 1999
SI-131	Municipality of Tržič	Občina Tržič	Tržič	15,106	
SI-132	Municipality of Turnišče	Občina Turnišče	Turnišče	3,338	
SI-133	Urban Municipality of Velenje	Mestna občina Velenje	Velenje	32,912	
SI-187	Municipality of Velika Polana	Občina Velika Polana	Velika Polana	1,469	Črenšovci, 1999
SI-134	Municipality of Velike Lašče	Občina Velike Lašče	Velike Lašče	4,240	
SI-188	Municipality of Veržej	Občina Veržej	Veržej	1,299	Ljutomer, 1999
SI-135	Municipality of Videm	Občina Videm	Videm pri Ptuju	5,603	
SI-136	Municipality of Vipava	Občina Vipava	Vipava	5,553	
SI-137	Municipality of Vitanje	Občina Vitanje	Vitanje	2,267	
SI-138	Municipality of Vodice	Občina Vodice	Vodice	4,778	
SI-139	Municipality of Vojnik	Občina Vojnik	Vojnik	8,510	
SI-189	Municipality of Vransko	Občina Vransko	Vransko	2,652	Žalec, 1999
SI-140	Municipality of Vrhnika	Občina Vrhnika	Vrhnika	16,543	
SI-141	Municipality of Vuzenica	Občina Vuzenica	Vuzenica	2,726	
SI-142	Municipality of Zagorje ob Savi	Občina Zagorje ob Savi	Zagorje ob Savi	16,901	
SI-190	Municipality of Žalec	Občina Žalec	Žalec	21,413	(code 145 until 1999)
SI-143	Municipality of Zavrč	Občina Zavrč	Zavrč	1,740	
SI-146	Municipality of Železniki	Občina Železniki	Železniki	6,789	
SI-191	Municipality of Žetale	Občina Žetale	Žetale	1,340	Majšperk, 1999
SI-147	Municipality of Žiri	Občina Žiri	Žiri	4,890	
SI-192	Municipality of Žirovnica	Občina Žirovnica	Breznica	4,401	Jesenice, 1999
SI-144	Municipality of Zreče	Občina Zreče	Zreče	6,389	
SI-193	Municipality of Žužemberk	Občina Žužemberk	Žužemberk	4,568	Novo Mesto, 1999

== Urban municipalities ==
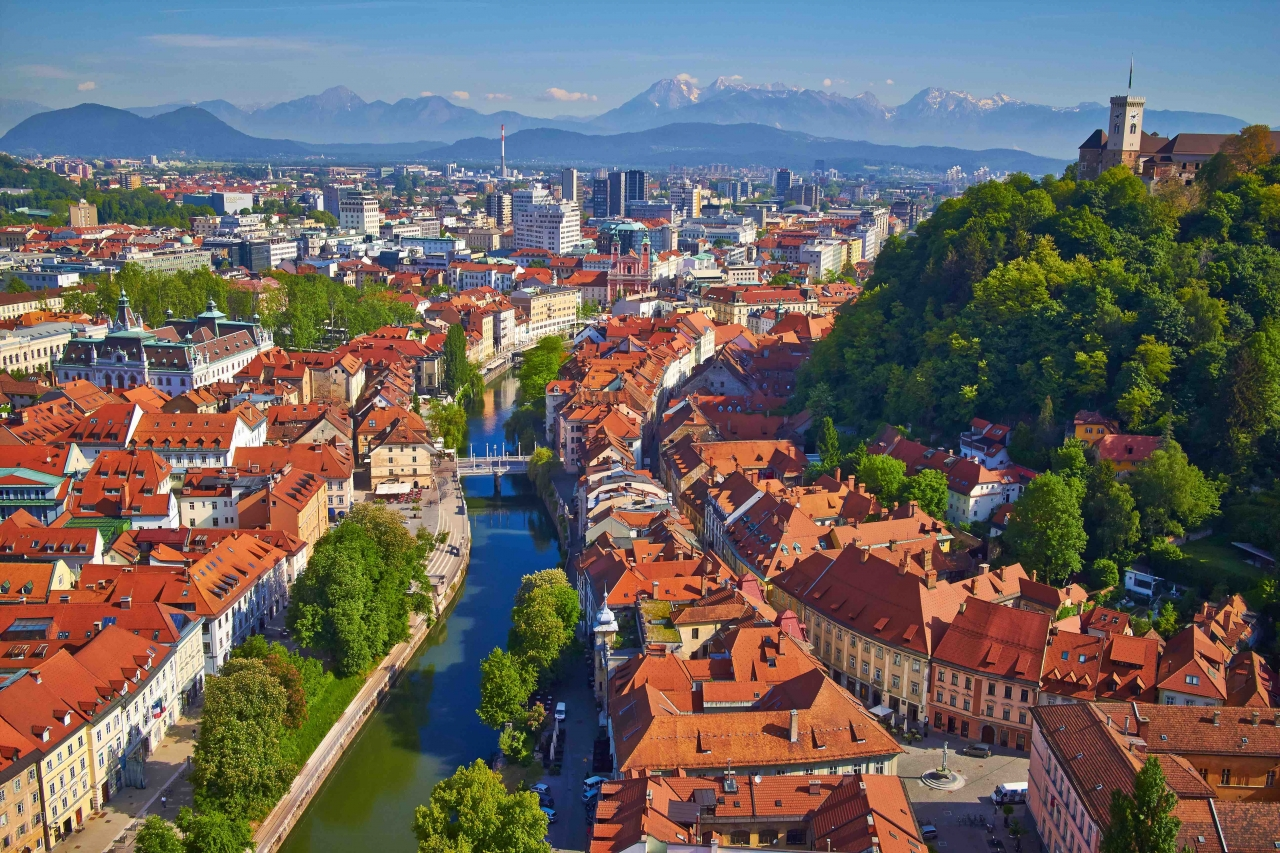
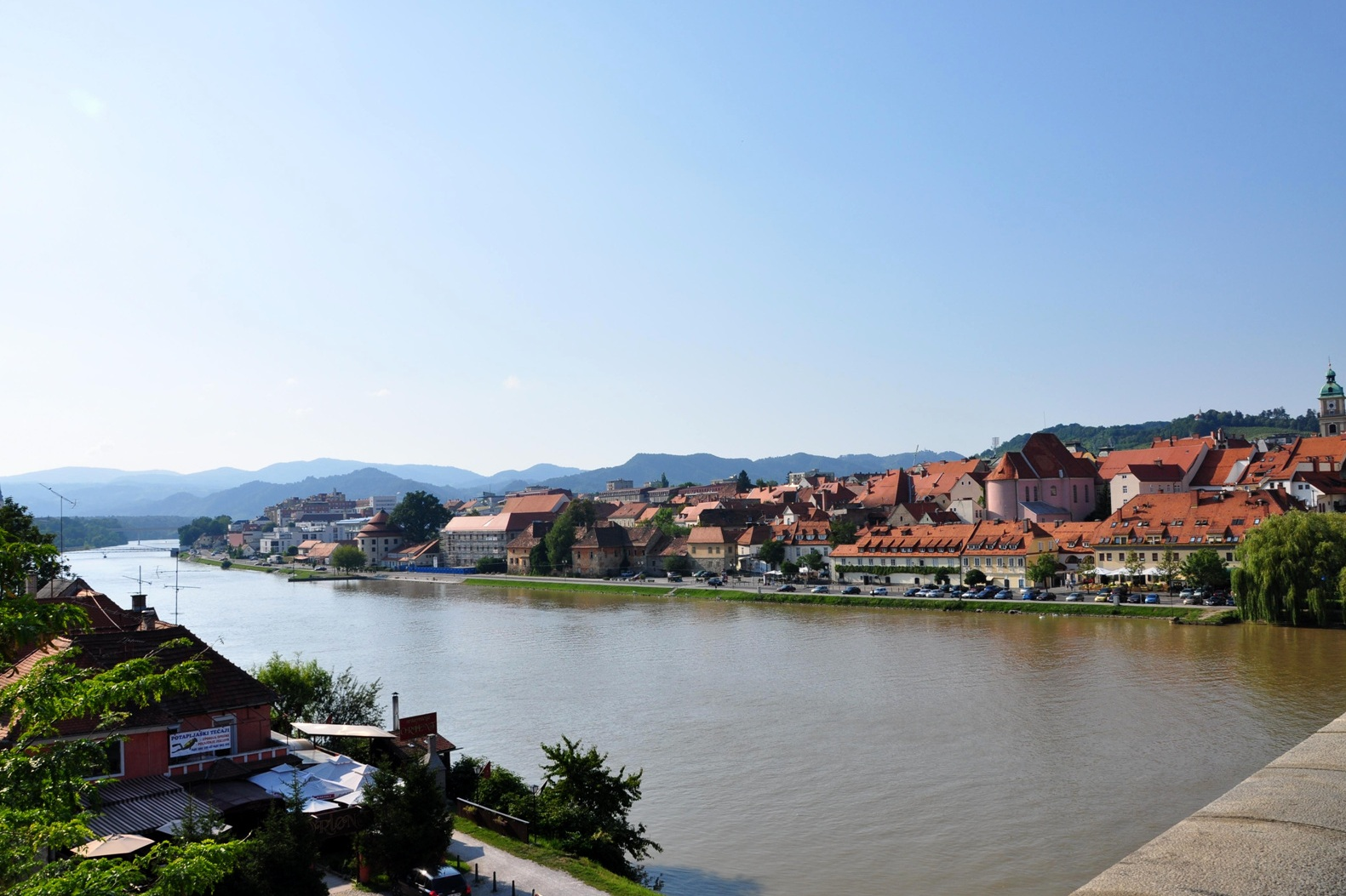
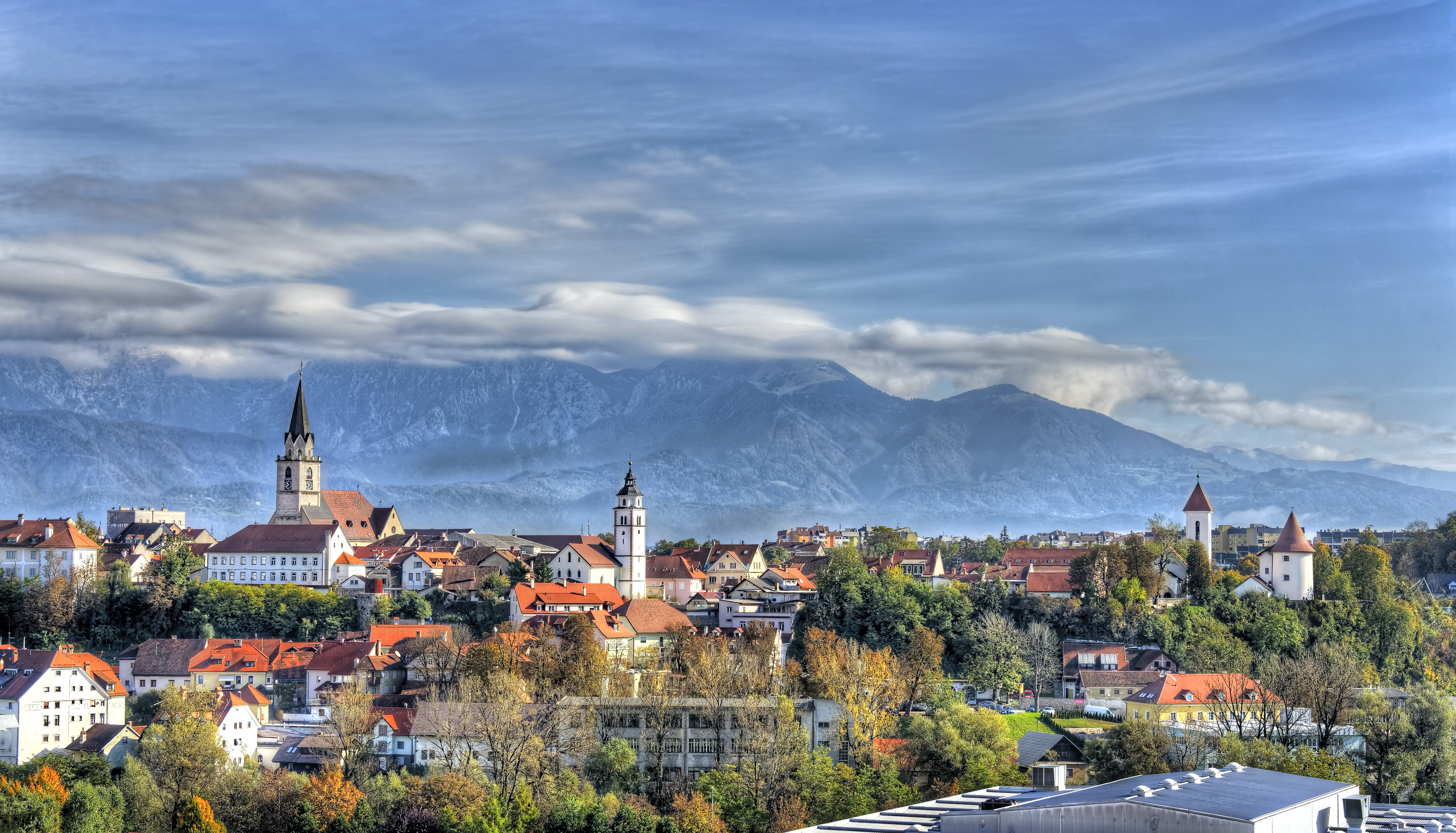
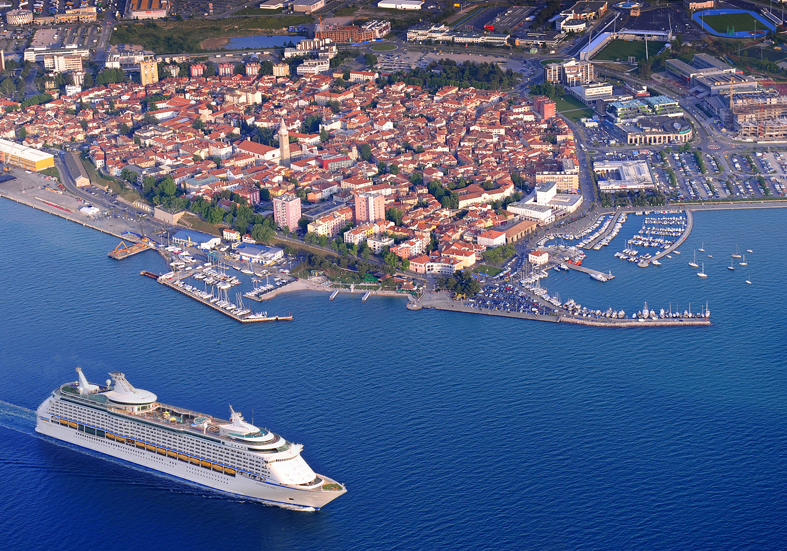
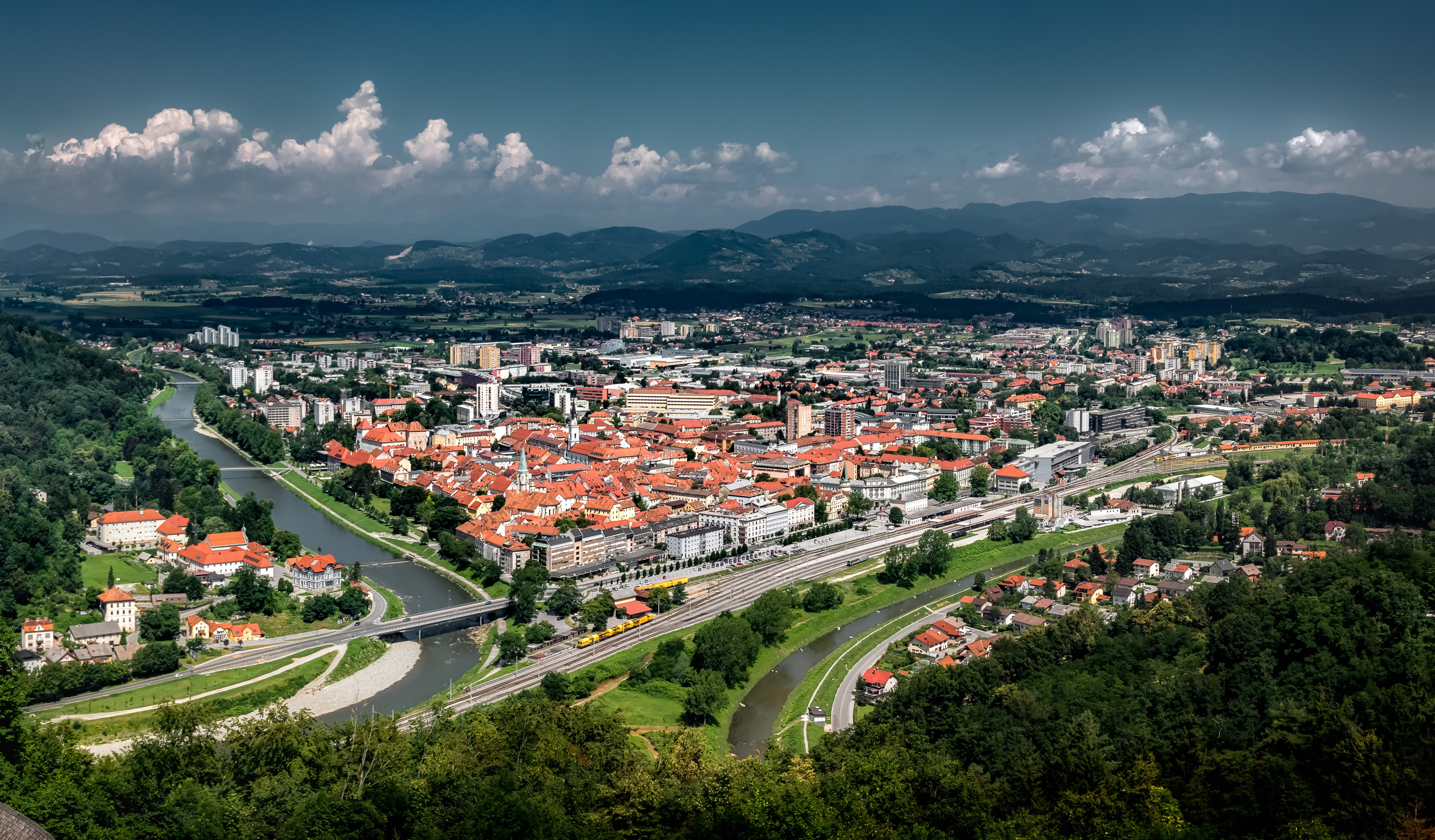
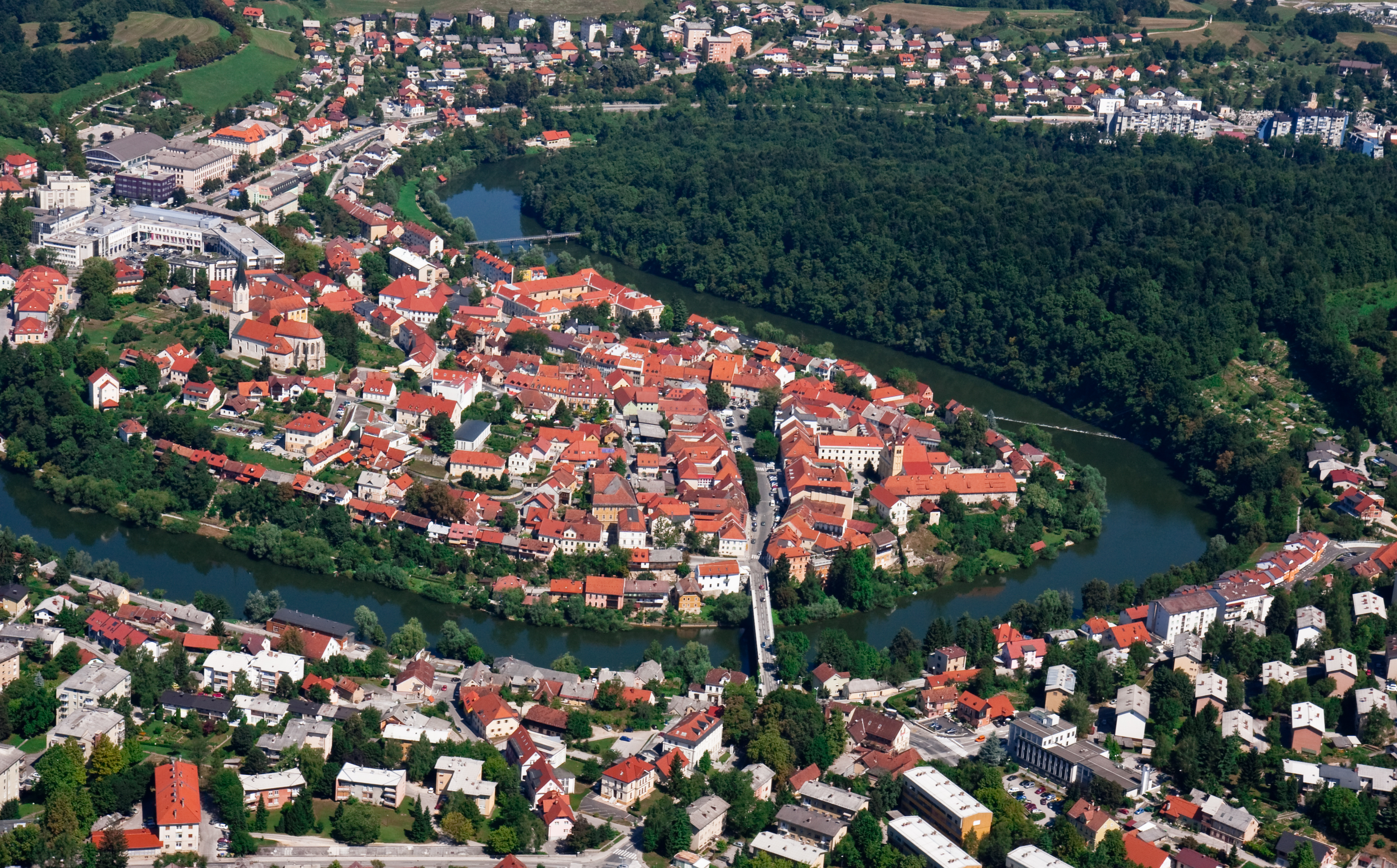
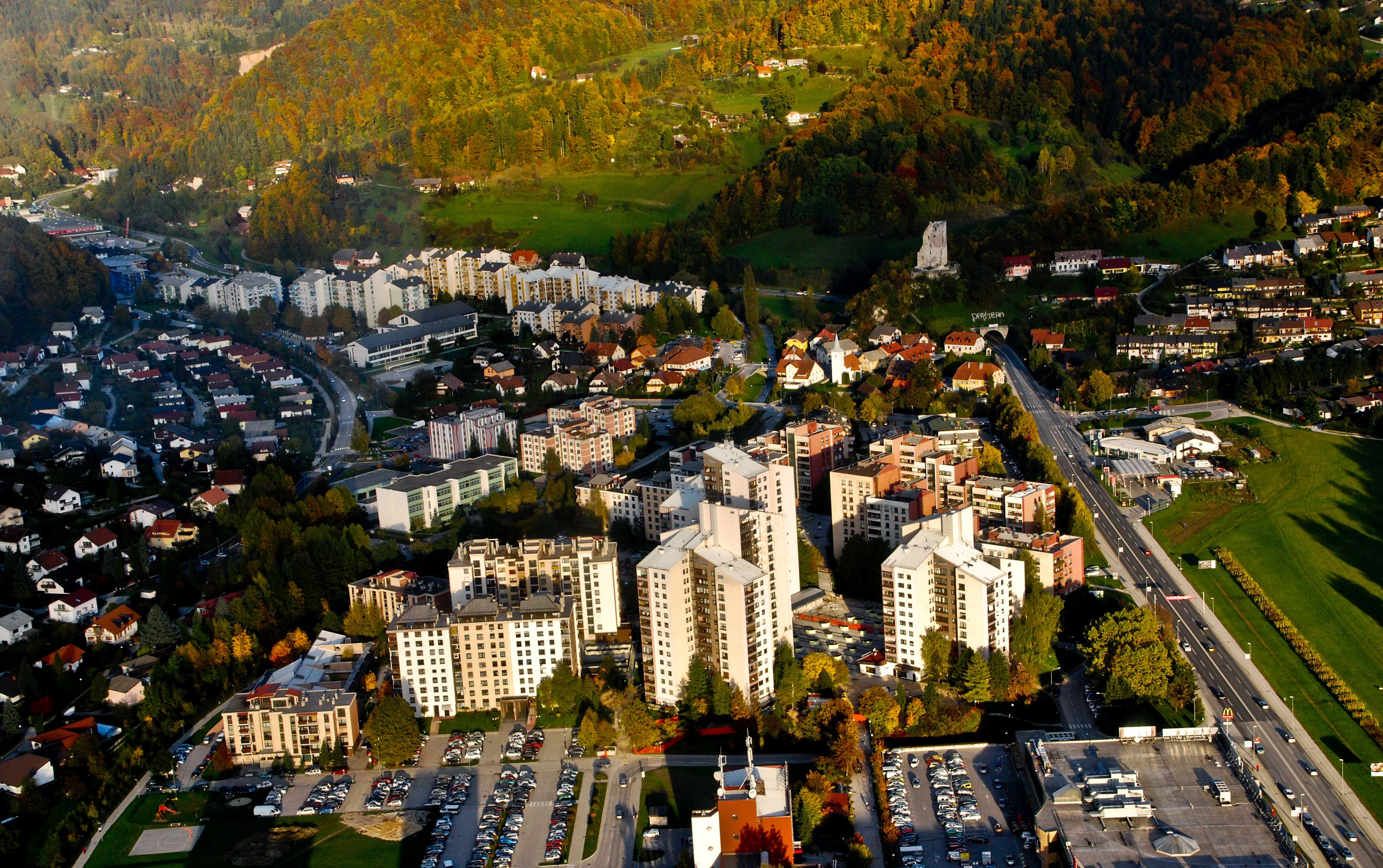
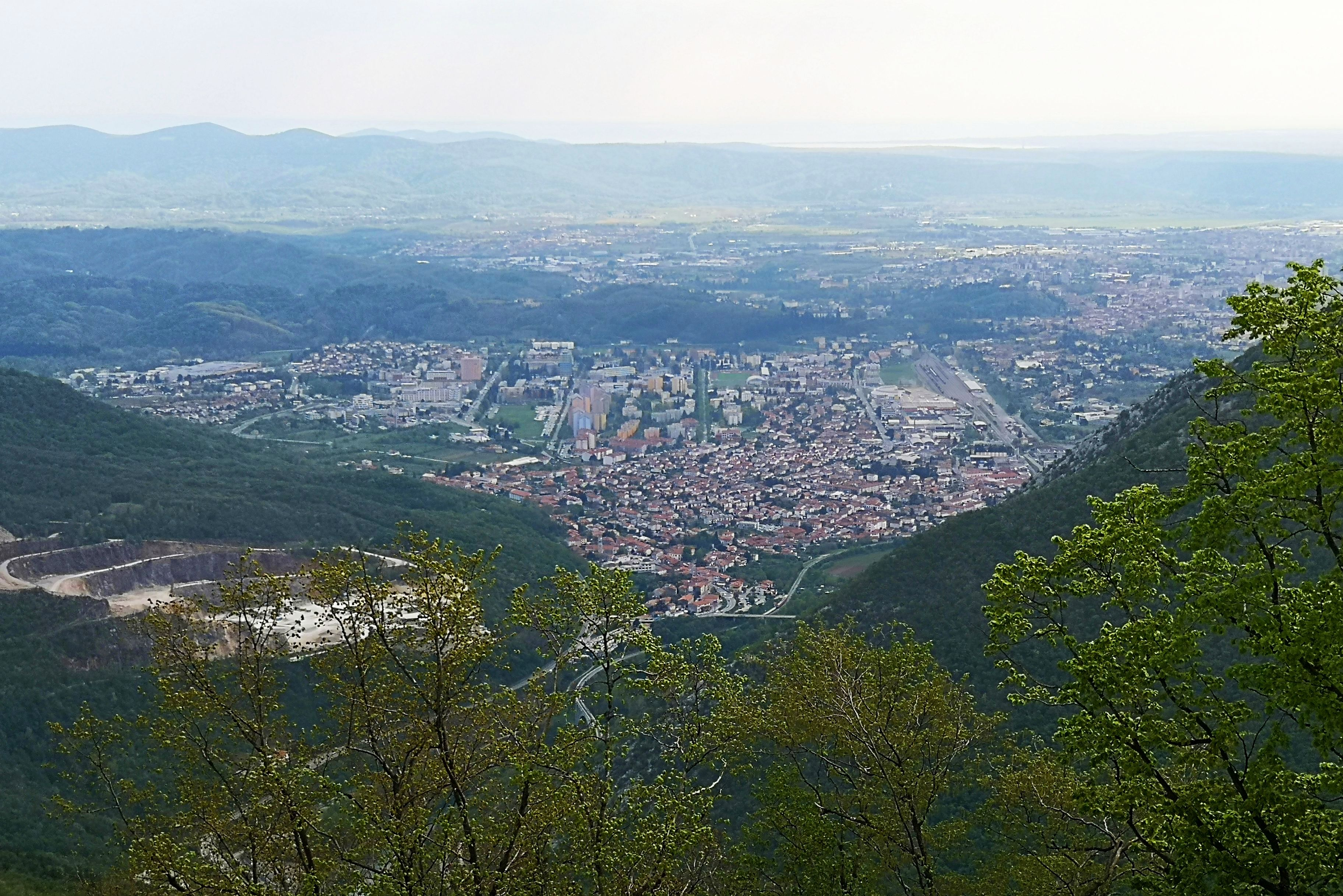
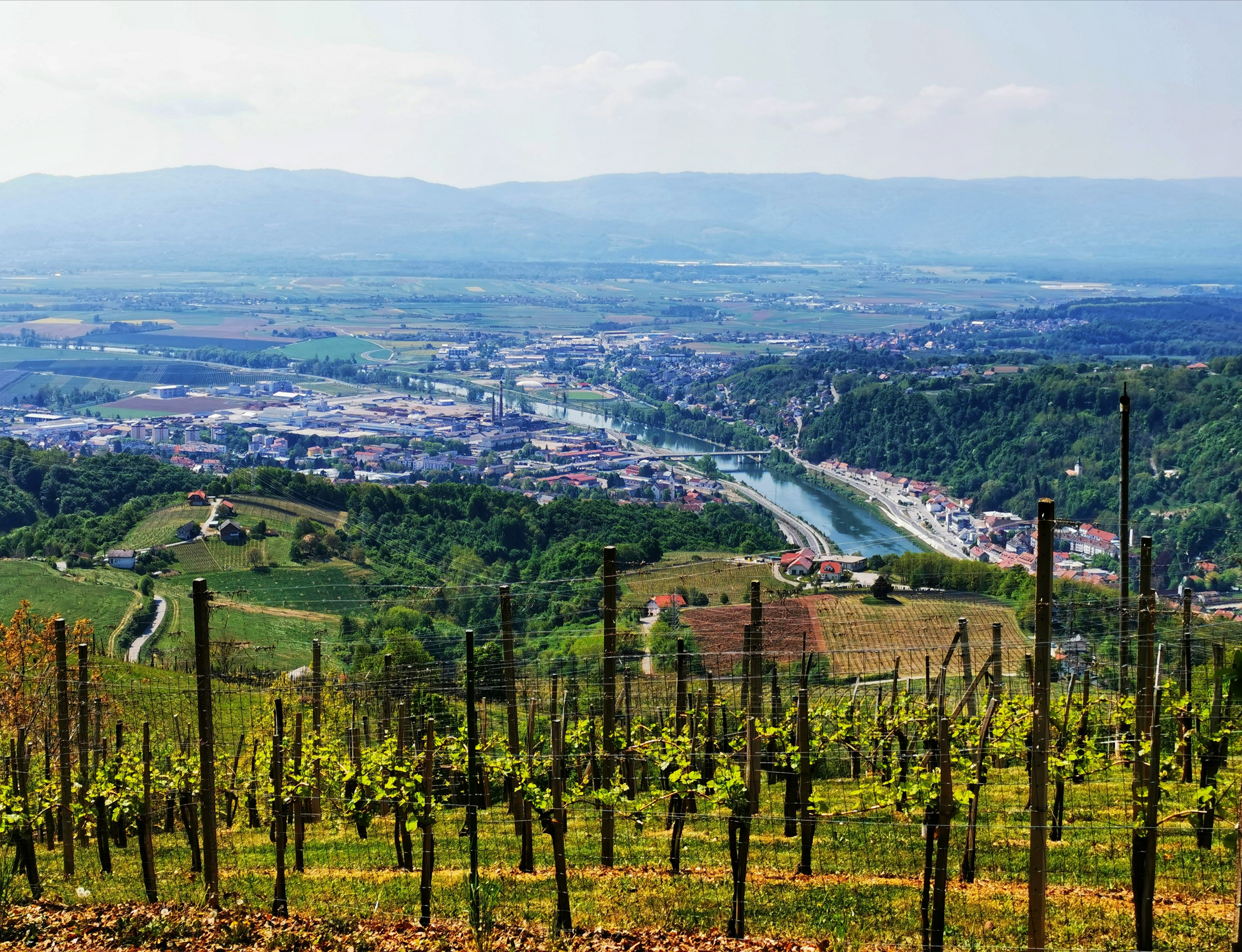
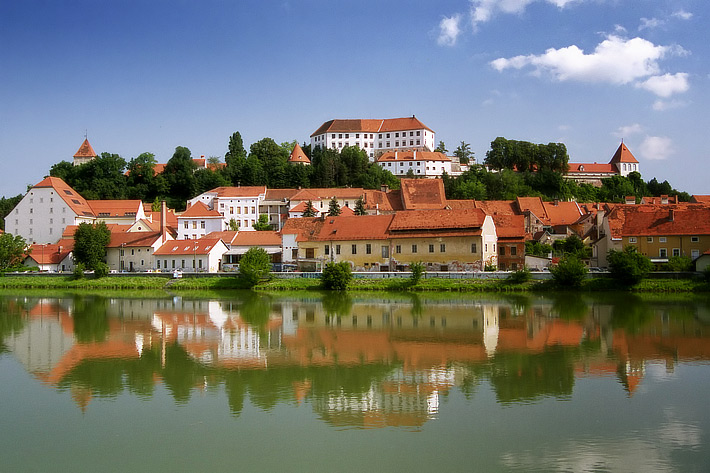
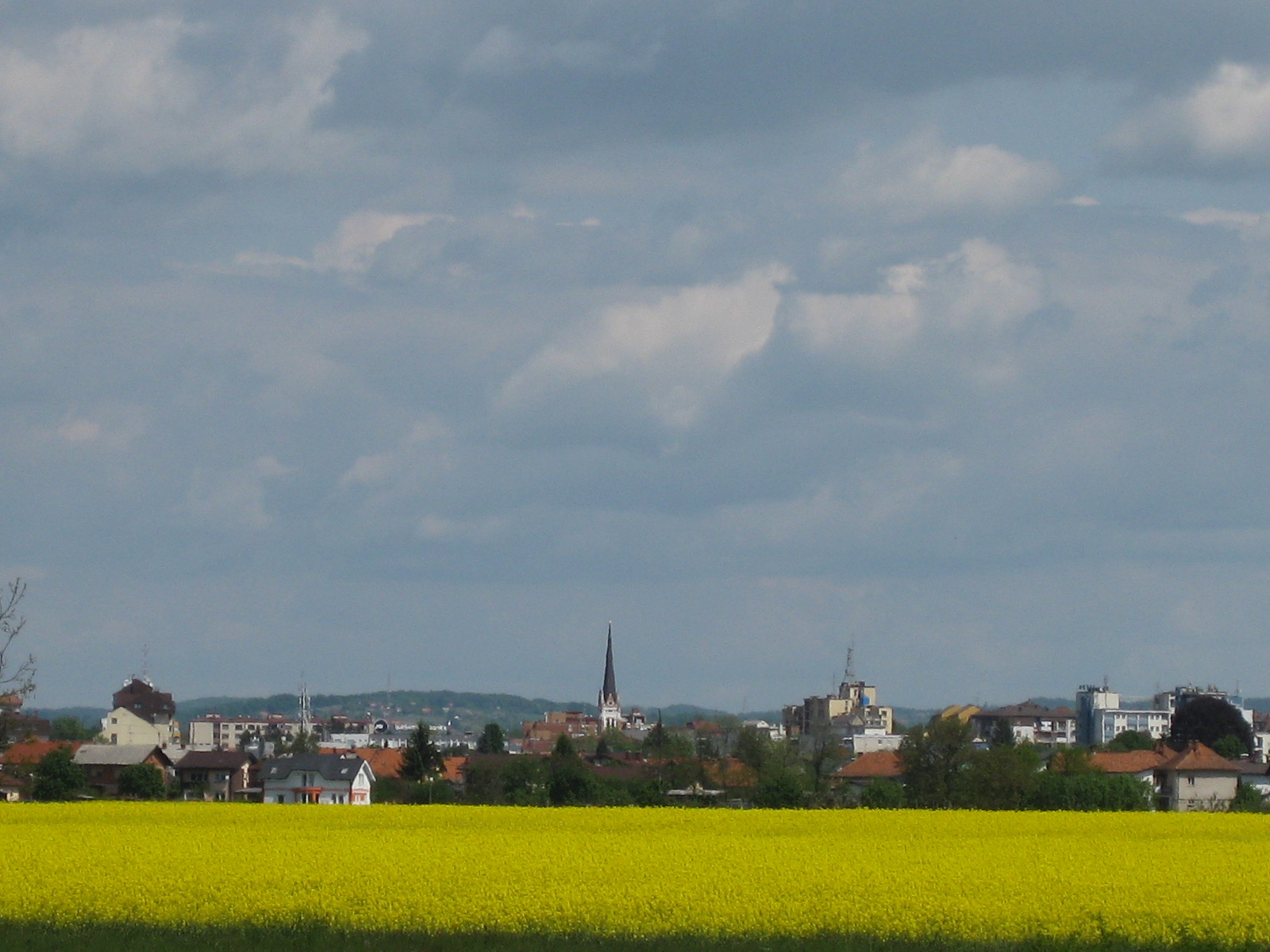
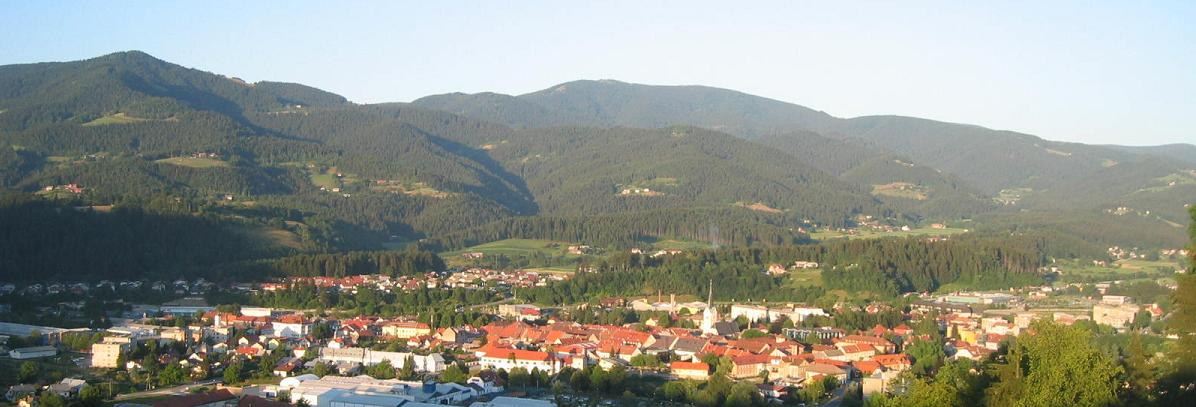
Urban municipalities in Slovenia
Ljubljana Maribor Kranj Koper Celje Novo Mesto	Rank	City	Population (as of 2021)	Velenje Nova Gorica Krško Ptuj Murska Sobota Slovenj Gradec
Ljubljana Maribor Kranj Koper Celje Novo Mesto	1	Ljubljana	294,464	Velenje Nova Gorica Krško Ptuj Murska Sobota Slovenj Gradec
Ljubljana Maribor Kranj Koper Celje Novo Mesto	2	Maribor	113,778	Velenje Nova Gorica Krško Ptuj Murska Sobota Slovenj Gradec
Ljubljana Maribor Kranj Koper Celje Novo Mesto	3	Kranj	57,185	Velenje Nova Gorica Krško Ptuj Murska Sobota Slovenj Gradec
Ljubljana Maribor Kranj Koper Celje Novo Mesto	4	Koper	53,292	Velenje Nova Gorica Krško Ptuj Murska Sobota Slovenj Gradec
Ljubljana Maribor Kranj Koper Celje Novo Mesto	5	Celje	49,007	Velenje Nova Gorica Krško Ptuj Murska Sobota Slovenj Gradec
Ljubljana Maribor Kranj Koper Celje Novo Mesto	6	Novo Mesto	37,398	Velenje Nova Gorica Krško Ptuj Murska Sobota Slovenj Gradec
Ljubljana Maribor Kranj Koper Celje Novo Mesto	7	Velenje	33,715	Velenje Nova Gorica Krško Ptuj Murska Sobota Slovenj Gradec
Ljubljana Maribor Kranj Koper Celje Novo Mesto	8	Nova Gorica	31,845	Velenje Nova Gorica Krško Ptuj Murska Sobota Slovenj Gradec
Ljubljana Maribor Kranj Koper Celje Novo Mesto	9	Krško	25,904	Velenje Nova Gorica Krško Ptuj Murska Sobota Slovenj Gradec
Ljubljana Maribor Kranj Koper Celje Novo Mesto	10	Ptuj	23,611	Velenje Nova Gorica Krško Ptuj Murska Sobota Slovenj Gradec
Ljubljana Maribor Kranj Koper Celje Novo Mesto	11	Murska Sobota	18,622	Velenje Nova Gorica Krško Ptuj Murska Sobota Slovenj Gradec
Ljubljana Maribor Kranj Koper Celje Novo Mesto	12	Slovenj Gradec	16,595	Velenje Nova Gorica Krško Ptuj Murska Sobota Slovenj Gradec

== See also ==
- ISO 3166-2:SI
- NUTS:SI
