= Pesnica =

Pesnica is a geographical name that may refer to:

- Pesnica (river), a river in northeastern Slovenia
- Pesnica pri Mariboru, a settlement in Municipality of Pesnica, northeastern Slovenia
- Municipality of Pesnica, a municipality in northeastern Slovenia
- Pesnica, Kungota, a settlement in Municipality of Kungota, northeastern Slovenia
