= Kozjak nad Pesnico =

- Location in Slovenia
- Coordinates: 46°36′34.87″N 15°38′0.85″E
- Country: Slovenia
- Traditional region: Styria
- Statistical region: Drava
- Municipality: Kungota

Area
  - Total: 6.99 km^{2} (2.70 sq mi)
- Elevation: 267.6 m (878 ft)

Population (2002)
  - Total: 560

Kozjak nad Pesnico (pronounced [kɔˈzjaːk nat ˈpeːsnitsɔ]) is a dispersed settlement in the Municipality of Kungota in the western part of the Slovenian Hills (Slovene: Slovenske gorice) in northeastern Slovenia.

== Name ==
The name of the settlement was changed from Kozjak to Kozjak nad Pesnico in 1955.

== Cultural heritage ==
There are two mansions in the settlement. Pahta Mansion (Slovene: Graščina Pahta or Pahtejev Grad) was built in 1870 in the hills south of Zgornja Kungota. Lepi Dol Mansion, built in the Pesnica Valley, is an early 18th-century Baroque mansion on the site of an earlier building. It was renovated in a Neoclassical style in the 19th century.
