= Slatenik =

- Location in Slovenia
- Coordinates: 46°37′5.02″N 15°44′12.54″E
- Country: Slovenia
- Traditional region: Styria
- Statistical region: Drava
- Municipality: Pesnica

Area
  - Total: 0.35 km^{2} (0.14 sq mi)
- Elevation: 287.1 m (942 ft)

Population (2002)
  - Total: 40

Slatenik (pronounced [ˈslaːtɛnik]) is a small dispersed settlement in the Municipality of Pesnica in northeastern Slovenia. It lies in the Slovene Hills (Slovene: Slovenske gorice) north of the local road from Vosek to Spodnji Jakobski Dol. The area is part of the traditional region of Styria. The municipality is now included in the Drava Statistical Region.
