= Vršnik =

- Location in Slovenia
- Coordinates: 46°38′16.04″N 15°34′35.61″E
- Country: Slovenia
- Traditional region: Styria
- Statistical region: Drava
- Municipality: Kungota

Area
  - Total: 2.93 km^{2} (1.13 sq mi)
- Elevation: 302.4 m (992 ft)

Population (2002)
  - Total: 130

Vršnik (pronounced [ˈʋəɾʃnik]) is a dispersed settlement west of Zgornja Kungota in the western Slovene Hills (Slovene: Slovenske gorice) in the Municipality of Kungota in northeastern Slovenia.
