= Slatinski Dol =

- Location in Slovenia
- Coordinates: 46°39′4.44″N 15°36′13.01″E
- Country: Slovenia
- Traditional region: Styria
- Statistical region: Drava
- Municipality: Kungota

Area
  - Total: 2.63 km^{2} (1.02 sq mi)
- Elevation: 295.5 m (969 ft)

Population (2002)
  - Total: 195

Slatinski Dol (pronounced [ˈslaːtinski ˈdoːl]) is a dispersed settlement in the western Slovene Hills (Slovene: Slovenske gorice) north and west of Zgornja Kungota in the Municipality of Kungota in northeastern Slovenia.
