= Zamarkova =

- Location in Slovenia
- Coordinates: 46°34′29.18″N 15°47′33.33″E
- Country: Slovenia
- Traditional region: Styria
- Statistical region: Drava
- Municipality: Municipality of Lenart

Area
  - Total: 3.4 km^{2} (1.3 sq mi)
- Elevation: 245.2 m (804 ft)

Population (2002)
  - Total: 109

Zamarkova (pronounced [ˈzaːmaɾkɔʋa]) is a settlement in the Municipality of Lenart in northeastern Slovenia. It lies on the left bank of the Pesnica River in the Slovene Hills (Slovene: Slovenske gorice). The area is part of the traditional region of Styria. It is now included in the Drava Statistical Region.

A number of Roman period burial mounds have been identified near the settlement.
