= Svečina =

- Location in Slovenia
- Coordinates: 46°40′25.62″N 15°35′32.98″E
- Country: Slovenia
- Traditional region: Styria
- Statistical region: Drava
- Municipality: Kungota

Area
  - Total: 2.16 km^{2} (0.83 sq mi)
- Elevation: 388.4 m (1,274 ft)

Population (2002)
  - Total: 154

Svečina (pronounced [sʋɛˈtʃiːna], German: Witschein) is a settlement in the western Slovene Hills (Slovene: Slovenske gorice) north of Plač in the Municipality of Kungota in northeastern Slovenia.

== Name ==
Svečina was attested in historical sources as Wetschin and Wetsine in 1197 (and as Wetschein and Baetscheine in 1269, among other spellings). Locally, the settlement is known as Svičina. The name may be derived from the common noun *věťe 'council', with the initial s- possibly by association with the related word svet 'advice'. In the past it was known as Witschein in German.

== Manor ==
There is a manor house in the settlement. Its foundations date to the 12th century, but the current building is late Renaissance, dating to 1629 with a square floor plan and four corner turrets. It was built by the monks of Saint Lambert's Abbey in Austria. Since 1936 it has been a secondary school, now belonging to the Agricultural College from Maribor.

== Notable people ==
Notable people that were born or lived in Svečina include:

- Andreas Perlach (1490–1551), court astrologer and chancellor of the University of Vienna
