= Nadbišec =

- Location in Slovenia
- Coordinates: 46°32′28.64″N 15°50′42.14″E
- Country: Slovenia
- Traditional region: Styria
- Statistical region: Drava
- Municipality: lenart

Area
  - Total: 1.45 km^{2} (0.56 sq mi)
- Elevation: 335.2 m (1,100 ft)

Population (2002)
  - Total: 93

Nadbišec (pronounced [ˈnaːdbiʃəts], in older sources Nadvišec, German: Nadwischetz) is a settlement in the Municipality of Lenart in northeastern Slovenia. It lies in the southwestern part of the Slovene Hills (Slovene: Slovenske gorice) south of the valley of the Pesnica River. The area is part of the traditional region of Styria. It is now included in the Drava Statistical Region.

A small chapel in the settlement dedicated to Saint Joseph was built in 1923.
