= Spodnje Vrtiče =

- Location in Slovenia
- Coordinates: 46°39′2.91″N 15°36′57.21″E
- Country: Slovenia
- Traditional region: Styria
- Statistical region: Drava
- Municipality: Kungota

Area
  - Total: 2.16 km^{2} (0.83 sq mi)
- Elevation: 309.5 m (1,015 ft)

Population (2002)
  - Total: 181

Spodnje Vrtiče (pronounced [ˈspoːdnjɛ ˈʋəɾtitʃɛ]) is a dispersed settlement in the western Slovene Hills (Slovene: Slovenske gorice) north of Zgornja Kungota in the Municipality of Kungota in northeastern Slovenia.
