= Jareninski Vrh =

- Location in Slovenia
- Coordinates: 46°38′10.3″N 15°42′0.83″E
- Country: Slovenia
- Traditional region: Styria
- Statistical region: Drava
- Municipality: Pesnica

Area
  - Total: 1.61 km^{2} (0.62 sq mi)
- Elevation: 340 m (1,120 ft)

Population (2002)
  - Total: 210

Jareninski Vrh (pronounced [jaɾɛˈniːnski ˈʋəɾx], German: Jahringberg) is a dispersed settlement in the Municipality of Pesnica in northeastern Slovenia. It lies along the ridge above Jareninski Dol in the western part of the Slovene Hills (Slovene: Slovenske gorice). The area is part of the traditional region of Styria and is now included in the Drava Statistical Region. Jarenina Creek (Slovene: Jareninski potok) flows along the western edge of the settlement.
