= Zgornji Žerjavci =

- Location in Slovenia
- Coordinates: 46°35′29.36″N 15°49′59.38″E
- Country: Slovenia
- Traditional region: Styria
- Statistical region: Drava
- Municipality: Lenart

Area
  - Total: 4.53 km^{2} (1.75 sq mi)
- Elevation: 261.3 m (857 ft)

Population (2002)
  - Total: 265

Zgornji Žerjavci (pronounced [ˈzɡoːɾnji ʒɛˈɾjaːu̯tsi]; German: Oberscheriafzen, or WWII-era Kranichsbühel) is a settlement in the Municipality of Lenart in northeastern Slovenia. It lies in the valley of Velka Creek, a left tributary of the Pesnica River in the Slovene Hills (Slovene: Slovenske gorice). The area is part of the traditional region of Styria. It is now included in the Drava Statistical Region.

A large number of Roman-period burial mounds have been identified near the settlement.
