= Zgornji Jakobski Dol =

- Location in Slovenia
- Coordinates: 46°39′3.66″N 15°43′6.43″E
- Country: Slovenia
- Traditional region: Styria
- Statistical region: Drava
- Municipality: Pesnica

Area
  - Total: 4.95 km^{2} (1.91 sq mi)
- Elevation: 306.6 m (1,006 ft)

Population (2016)
  - Total: 327

Zgornji Jakobski Dol (pronounced [ˈzɡoːɾnji ˈjaːkɔpski ˈdoːl], German: Oberjakobsthal) is a settlement in the Municipality of Pesnica in northeastern Slovenia. It lies in the Slovene Hills (Slovene: Slovenske gorice). The area is part of the traditional region of Styria. The municipality is now included in the Drava Statistical Region.

A small roadside chapel-shrine on the road to Polička Vas was built in 1909.
