= Jedlovnik =

- Location in Slovenia
- Coordinates: 46°38′48.22″N 15°35′15.46″E
- Country: Slovenia
- Traditional region: Styria
- Statistical region: Drava
- Municipality: Kungota

Area
  - Total: 1.81 km^{2} (0.70 sq mi)
- Elevation: 339.5 m (1,114 ft)

Population (2002)
  - Total: 95

Jedlovnik (pronounced [jɛˈdloːu̯nik]) is a dispersed settlement in the hills northwest of Zgornja Kungota in the Municipality of Kungota in the western part of the Slovene Hills (Slovene: Slovenske gorice) in northeastern Slovenia.
