= Gačnik =

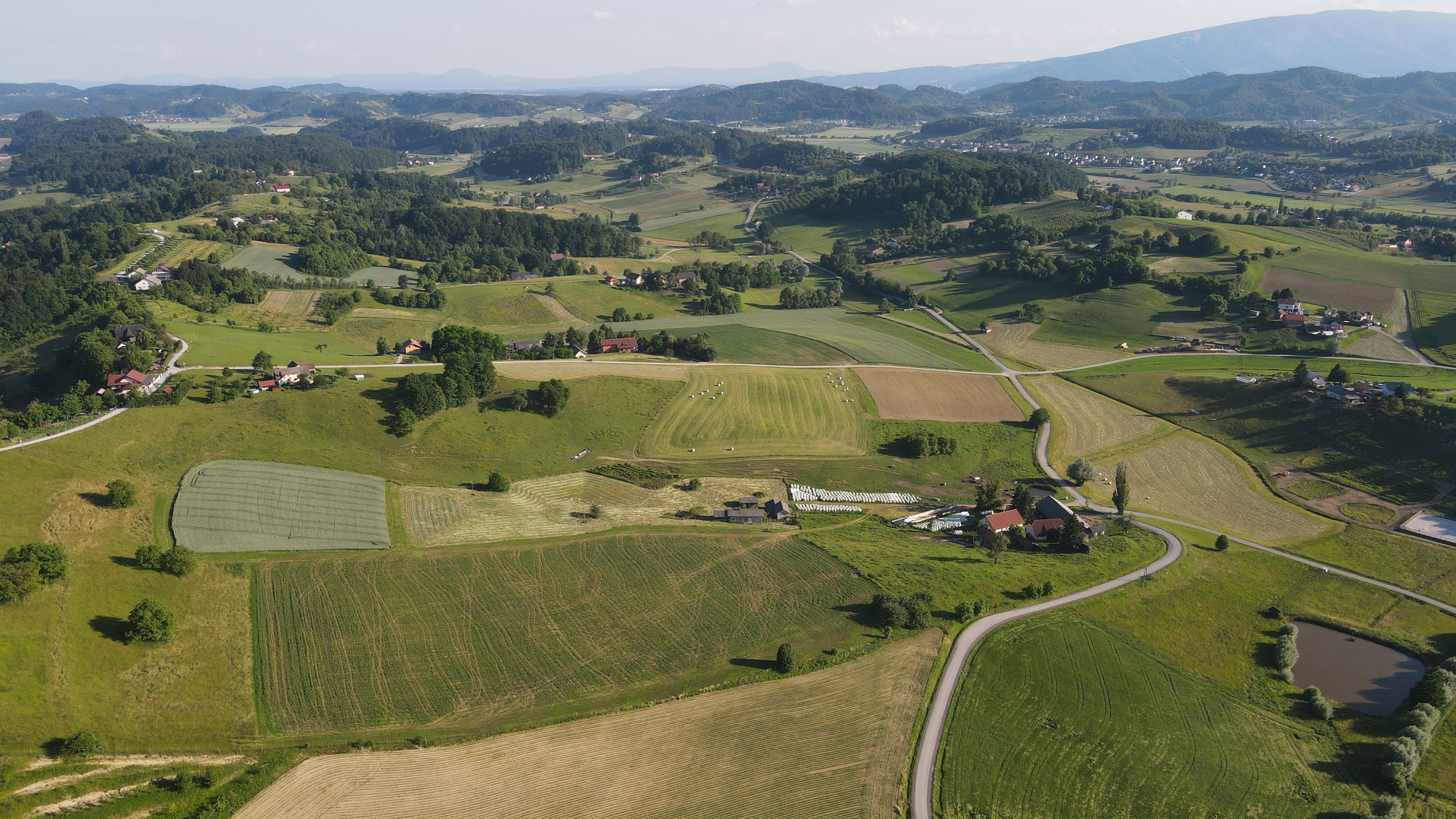

- Location in Slovenia
- Coordinates: 46°37′49.03″N 15°40′50.98″E
- Country: Slovenia
- Traditional region: Styria
- Statistical region: Drava
- Municipality: Pesnica

Area
  - Total: 4.79 km^{2} (1.85 sq mi)
- Elevation: 301.9 m (990 ft)

Population (2002)
  - Total: 492

Gačnik (pronounced [ˈɡaːtʃnik]) is a settlement in the Municipality of Pesnica in northeastern Slovenia. It lies in the western part of the Slovene Hills (Slovene: Slovenske gorice) in the valley of Gačnik Creek (Slovene: Gačniški potok), a minor tributary of the Pesnica River. The area is part of the traditional region of Styria. It is now included in the Drava Statistical Region.

A small roadside chapel-shrine in the settlement dates to 1803.
