= Grušena =

- Location in Slovenia
- Coordinates: 46°39′9.26″N 15°34′14.07″E
- Country: Slovenia
- Traditional region: Styria
- Statistical region: Drava
- Municipality: Kungota

Area
  - Total: 1.89 km^{2} (0.73 sq mi)
- Elevation: 326.7 m (1,072 ft)

Population (2002)
  - Total: 115

Grušena (pronounced [ˈɡɾuːʃɛna]) is a dispersed settlement in the hills above Jurij ob Pesnici in the Municipality of Kungota in the western part of the Slovene Hills (Slovene: Slovenske gorice) in northeastern Slovenia.
