= Vukovski Vrh =

- Location in Slovenia
- Coordinates: 46°36′55.18″N 15°42′50.63″E
- Country: Slovenia
- Traditional region: Styria
- Statistical region: Drava
- Municipality: Pesnica

Area
  - Total: 2.29 km^{2} (0.88 sq mi)
- Elevation: 266.4 m (874 ft)

Population (2002)
  - Total: 266

Vukovski Vrh (pronounced [ˈʋuːkɔu̯ski ˈʋəɾx]) is a dispersed settlement in the Municipality of Pesnica in northeastern Slovenia. It lies along a ridge east of Jareninski Dol in the Slovene Hills (Slovene: Slovenske gorice). The area is part of the traditional region of Styria and is now included in the Drava Statistical Region.
