= Municipality of Pesnica =

Municipality of Slovenia

Municipality of Pesnica Občina Pesnica
- Municipality
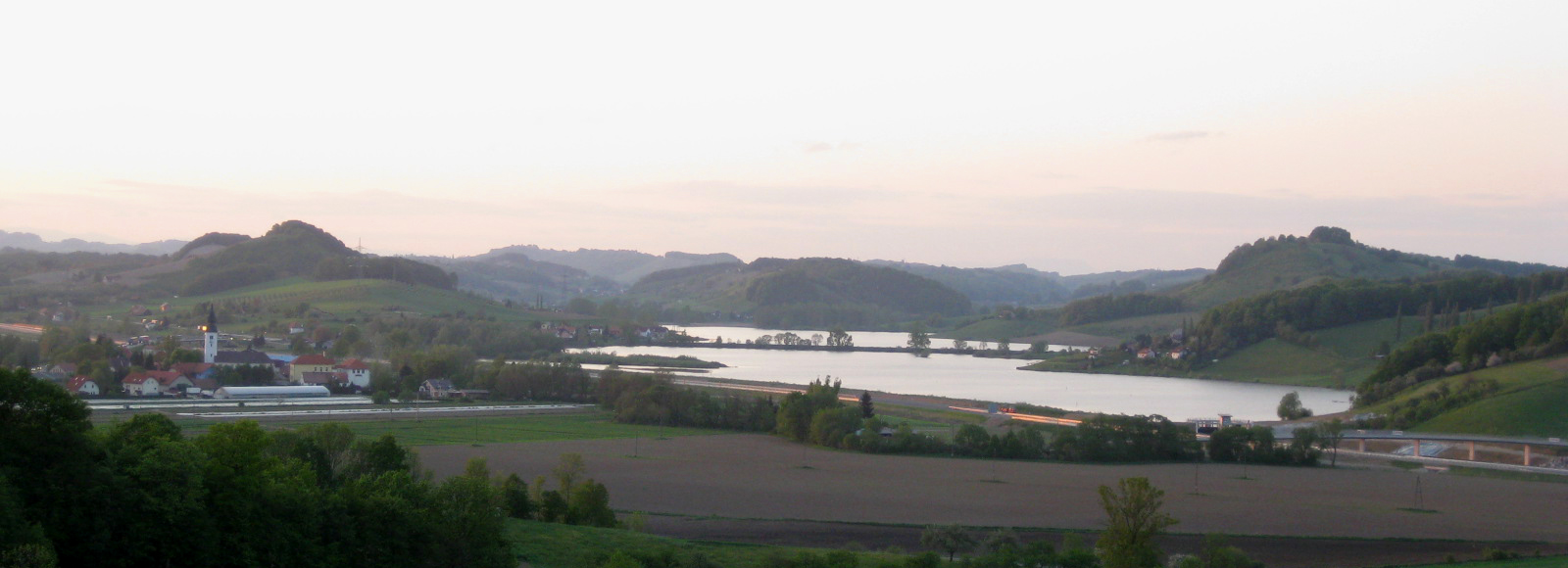

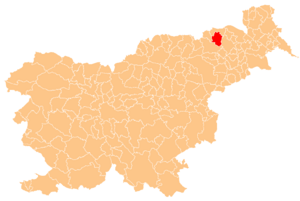
- Location of the Municipality of Pesnica in Slovenia
- Coordinates: 46°36′35″N 15°40′17″E
- Country: Slovenia

Government
  - Mayor: Venčeslav Senekovič (SLS)

Area
  - Total: 75.8 km^{2} (29.3 sq mi)

Population (2002)
  - Total: 7,244
  - Density: 95.6/km^{2} (248/sq mi)
- Time zone: UTC+01 (CET)
  - Summer (DST): UTC+02 (CEST)
- Website: www.pesnica.si

The Municipality of Pesnica (Slovene: Občina Pesnica) is a municipality in northeastern Slovenia. The seat of the municipality is Pesnica pri Mariboru, a suburb near Maribor. It lies at the western end of the Slovene Hills in the Upper Pesnica Valley. The area is part of the traditional region of Styria. It is now included in the Drava Statistical Region as part of the Pesnica Administrative Unit (Slovene: Upravna enota Pesnica). The main economic activities in the area are tourism, transportation, viticulture, winemaking, craftsmanship and farming.

== Settlements ==
In addition to the municipal seat of Pesnica pri Mariboru, the municipality also includes the following settlements:

- Dolnja Počehova
- Dragučova
- Drankovec
- Flekušek
- Gačnik
- Jareninski Dol
- Jareninski Vrh
- Jelenče
- Kušernik
- Ložane
- Mali Dol
- Pernica
- Pesniški Dvor
- Počenik
- Polička Vas
- Polički Vrh
- Ranca
- Ročica
- Slatenik
- Spodnje Dobrenje
- Spodnje Hlapje
- Spodnji Jakobski Dol
- Vajgen
- Vosek
- Vukovje
- Vukovski Dol
- Vukovski Vrh
- Zgornje Hlapje
- Zgornji Jakobski Dol

== Notable people ==
Notable people from Pesnica include:

- Rene Krhin (born 1990), a football player
- Jan Muršak (born 1988), a hockey player
- Tone Partljič (born 1940), a writer, screenwriter, and politician
- Ivo Štandeker (1961–1992), a writer and journalist who was killed in Sarajevo during the war
