= Vukovje =

- Location in Slovenia
- Coordinates: 46°35′16.21″N 15°45′0.39″E
- Country: Slovenia
- Traditional region: Styria
- Statistical region: Drava
- Municipality: Pesnica

Area
  - Total: 5.33 km^{2} (2.06 sq mi)
- Elevation: 279.2 m (916 ft)

Population (2002)
  - Total: 350

Vukovje (pronounced [ˈʋuːkɔu̯jɛ]) is a settlement in the Municipality of Pesnica in northeastern Slovenia. It lies north and east of the Pernica Reservoir (Slovene: Perniško jezero) in the Slovene Hills (Slovene: Slovenske gorice). The area is part of the traditional region of Styria. The municipality is now included in the Drava Statistical Region.

Two small roadside chapel-shrines in the settlement date to the early 20th century.
