= Vinička Vas =

- Location in Slovenia
- Coordinates: 46°32′58.9″N 15°45′46.85″E
- Country: Slovenia
- Traditional region: Styria
- Statistical region: Drava
- Municipality: Municipality of Lenart

Area
  - Total: 2.21 km^{2} (0.85 sq mi)
- Elevation: 320.4 m (1,051 ft)

Population (2002)
  - Total: 147

Vinička Vas (pronounced [ʋiˈniːtʃka ˈʋaːs]; Slovene: Vinička vas) is a settlement in the Municipality of Lenart in northeastern Slovenia. It lies in the Slovene Hills (Slovene: Slovenske gorice) southwest of Hrastovec. The area is part of the traditional region of Styria. It is now included in the Drava Statistical Region.

A small chapel in the settlement dates to the early 20th century.
