= Vajgen =

- Location in Slovenia
- Coordinates: 46°38′58.94″N 15°40′58.91″E
- Country: Slovenia
- Traditional region: Styria
- Statistical region: Drava
- Municipality: Pesnica

Area
  - Total: 2.29 km^{2} (0.88 sq mi)
- Elevation: 299.5 m (983 ft)

Population (2002)
  - Total: 103

Vajgen (pronounced [ˈʋaːi̯ɡən]) is a dispersed settlement in the Municipality of Pesnica in northeastern Slovenia. It lies in the Slovene Hills (Slovene: Slovenske gorice), north of Jareninski Dol. The area is part of the traditional region of Styria. The municipality is now included in the Drava Statistical Region.
