= Pesniški Dvor =

- Location in Slovenia
- Coordinates: 46°36′3.49″N 15°41′36.17″E
- Country: Slovenia
- Traditional region: Styria
- Statistical region: Drava
- Municipality: Pesnica

Area
  - Total: 1.47 km^{2} (0.57 sq mi)
- Elevation: 267.7 m (878 ft)

Population (2002)
  - Total: 101

Pesniški Dvor (pronounced [ˈpeːsniʃki ˈdʋoːɾ]) is a settlement in the Municipality of Pesnica in northeastern Slovenia. It lies in the Pesnica Valley in the traditional region of Styria. The entire municipality is now included in the Drava Statistical Region.

The name Pesniški Dvor literally means 'Pesnica Manor'. It gets its name from a 17th-century Baroque mansion (Slovene: dvor) in the settlement. Until 1935 it was in the possession of St. Paul's Abbey in the Lavanttal. After the Second World War it was used by an agricultural conglomerate. Despite being protected as a monument of cultural heritage by the Slovenian Ministry of Culture, it is in a very bad state of repair.
