= Perlach =

Perlach may refer to:

- Ramersdorf-Perlach, one of 25 boroughs/districts of Munich, Germany
- Perlachturm, (English: Perlach Tower), a bell tower built in 1182 in Augsburg, Germany
- Andreas Perlach, court astrologer to Archduke Ferdinand of Habsburg

== See also ==
- Perlakh, "0.000 01" or "One hundred-thousandth"
