= Zgornja Voličina =

- Location in Slovenia
- Coordinates: 46°32′57.64″N 15°47′16.97″E
- Country: Slovenia
- Traditional region: Styria
- Statistical region: Drava
- Municipality: lenart

Area
  - Total: 5.6 km^{2} (2.2 sq mi)
- Elevation: 286.8 m (941 ft)

Population (2002)
  - Total: 560

Zgornja Voličina (pronounced [ˈzɡoːɾnja ʋɔˈliːtʃina], in older sources Zgornja Veličina, German: Oberwellitschen) is a settlement in the Slovene Hills (Slovene: Slovenske gorice) in the Municipality of Lenart in northeastern Slovenia. The area is part of the traditional region of Styria and is now included in the Drava Statistical Region.
