= Plintovec =

- Location in Slovenia
- Coordinates: 46°38′24.92″N 15°37′14.18″E
- Country: Slovenia
- Traditional region: Styria
- Statistical region: Drava
- Municipality: Kungota

Area
  - Total: 2.7 km^{2} (1.0 sq mi)
- Elevation: 328.1 m (1,076 ft)

Population (2002)
  - Total: 562

Plintovec (pronounced [ˈpliːntɔʋəts]; in older sources also Blintovec, German: Blintenbach) is a settlement next to Zgornja Kungota in the Municipality of Kungota in northeastern Slovenia.

== Geography ==
Plintovec is a scattered settlement with a denser village core in a valley immediately southeast of Zgornja Kungota on the left bank of Svečina Creek (Svečinski potok) and the main road from Maribor to Zgornja Kungota. The remainder of the settlement is scattered across hills to the east, which are cut by deep valleys. Most of the village's area consists of pastures, tilled fields, and orchards, and there are also a few forested areas and vineyards.
