= Kušernik =

- Location in Slovenia
- Coordinates: 46°36′14.29″N 15°43′54.47″E
- Country: Slovenia
- Traditional region: Styria
- Statistical region: Drava
- Municipality: Pesnica

Area
  - Total: 0.85 km^{2} (0.33 sq mi)
- Elevation: 276.9 m (908 ft)

Population (2002)
  - Total: 102

Kušernik (pronounced [ˈkuːʃɛɾnik]) is a small settlement in the Municipality of Pesnica in northeastern Slovenia. It lies in the Slovene Hills (Slovene: Slovenske gorice), part of the traditional region of Styria. The municipality is now included in the Drava Statistical Region.

A small roadside chapel-shrine in the settlement dates to 1909.
