= Močna =

- Location in Slovenia
- Coordinates: 46°34′29.34″N 15°45′34.97″E
- Country: Slovenia
- Traditional region: Styria
- Statistical region: Drava
- Municipality: Lenart

Area
  - Total: 2.3 km^{2} (0.89 sq mi)
- Elevation: 264 m (866 ft)

Population (2002)
  - Total: 242

Močna (pronounced [ˈmoːtʃna]) is a settlement in the Municipality of Lenart in northeastern Slovenia. It lies in the Slovene Hills (Slovene: Slovenske gorice) on the main regional road from Maribor to Lenart. The area is part of the traditional region of Styria. It is now included in the Drava Statistical Region.

A small chapel in the settlement dates to around 1800.
