= Gradenšak =

- Location in Slovenia
- Coordinates: 46°32′34.35″N 15°50′14.06″E
- Country: Slovenia
- Traditional region: Lower Styria
- Statistical region: Drava
- Municipality: Lenart

Area
  - Total: 0.23 km^{2} (0.089 sq mi)
- Elevation: 306.3 m (1,005 ft)

Population (2002)
  - Total: 25

Gradenšak (pronounced [ɡɾaˈdeːnʃak], German: Gradenscheg) is a small settlement in the Municipality of Lenart in northeastern Slovenia. It lies in the Slovene Hills (Slovene: Slovenske gorice). The area is part of the traditional region of Styria and is now included in the Drava Statistical Region.
