= Spodnji Žerjavci =

- Location in Slovenia
- Coordinates: 46°36′21.47″N 15°51′30.88″E
- Country: Slovenia
- Traditional region: Styria
- Statistical region: Drava
- Municipality: Lenart

Area
  - Total: 2.41 km^{2} (0.93 sq mi)
- Elevation: 287.5 m (943 ft)

Population (2002)
  - Total: 320

Spodnji Žerjavci (pronounced [ˈspoːdnji ʒɛˈɾjaːu̯tsi]) is a settlement in the Municipality of Lenart in northeastern Slovenia. It lies in the Slovene Hills (Slovene: Slovenske gorice), just off the road from Lenart towards Benedikt. The area is part of the traditional region of Styria. It is now included in the Drava Statistical Region.

There are two small chapels in the settlement. One dates to 1869 and the second dates to the early 20th century.
