= Rogoznica, Lenart =

Rogoznica
- Location in Slovenia
- Coordinates: 46°29′56.47″N 15°49′5.5″E
- Country: Slovenia
- Traditional region: Styria
- Statistical region: Drava
- Municipality: Lenart

Area
  - Total: 2.63 km^{2} (1.02 sq mi)
- Elevation: 349.3 m (1,146 ft)

Population (2002)
  - Total: 120

Rogoznica (pronounced [ɾɔˈɡoːznitsa]) is a small settlement in the Municipality of Lenart in northeastern Slovenia. It lies in the Slovene Hills (Slovene: Slovenske gorice) at the source of Rogoznica Creek, a minor left tributary of the Drava River that flows into the Drava at Lake Ptuj. The area is part of the traditional region of Styria. It is now included in the Drava Statistical Region.
