= Pesnica, Kungota =

Pesnica
- Location in Slovenia
- Coordinates: 46°38′30.5″N 15°33′52.5″E
- Country: Slovenia
- Traditional region: Styria
- Statistical region: Drava
- Municipality: Kungota

Area
  - Total: 3.33 km^{2} (1.29 sq mi)
- Elevation: 311.5 m (1,022 ft)

Population (2002)
  - Total: 159

Pesnica (pronounced [ˈpéːsnitsa]) is a dispersed settlement in the hills south of Jurij ob Pesnici in the Municipality of Kungota in the western part of the Slovene Hills (Slovene: Slovenske gorice) in northeastern Slovenia, right on the border with Austria.
