= Vukovski Dol =

- Location in Slovenia
- Coordinates: 46°36′42.28″N 15°43′32.29″E
- Country: Slovenia
- Traditional region: Styria
- Statistical region: Drava
- Municipality: Pesnica

Area
  - Total: 2.62 km^{2} (1.01 sq mi)
- Elevation: 320.8 m (1,052 ft)

Population (2002)
  - Total: 266

Vukovski Dol (pronounced [ˈʋuːkɔu̯ski ˈdo:l]) is a settlement in the Slovene Hills (Slovene: Slovenske gorice) in northeastern Slovenia. It lies in the Municipality of Pesnica, part of the traditional region of Styria. The municipality is now included in the Drava Statistical Region.
