= Gradiška, Kungota =

Gradiška
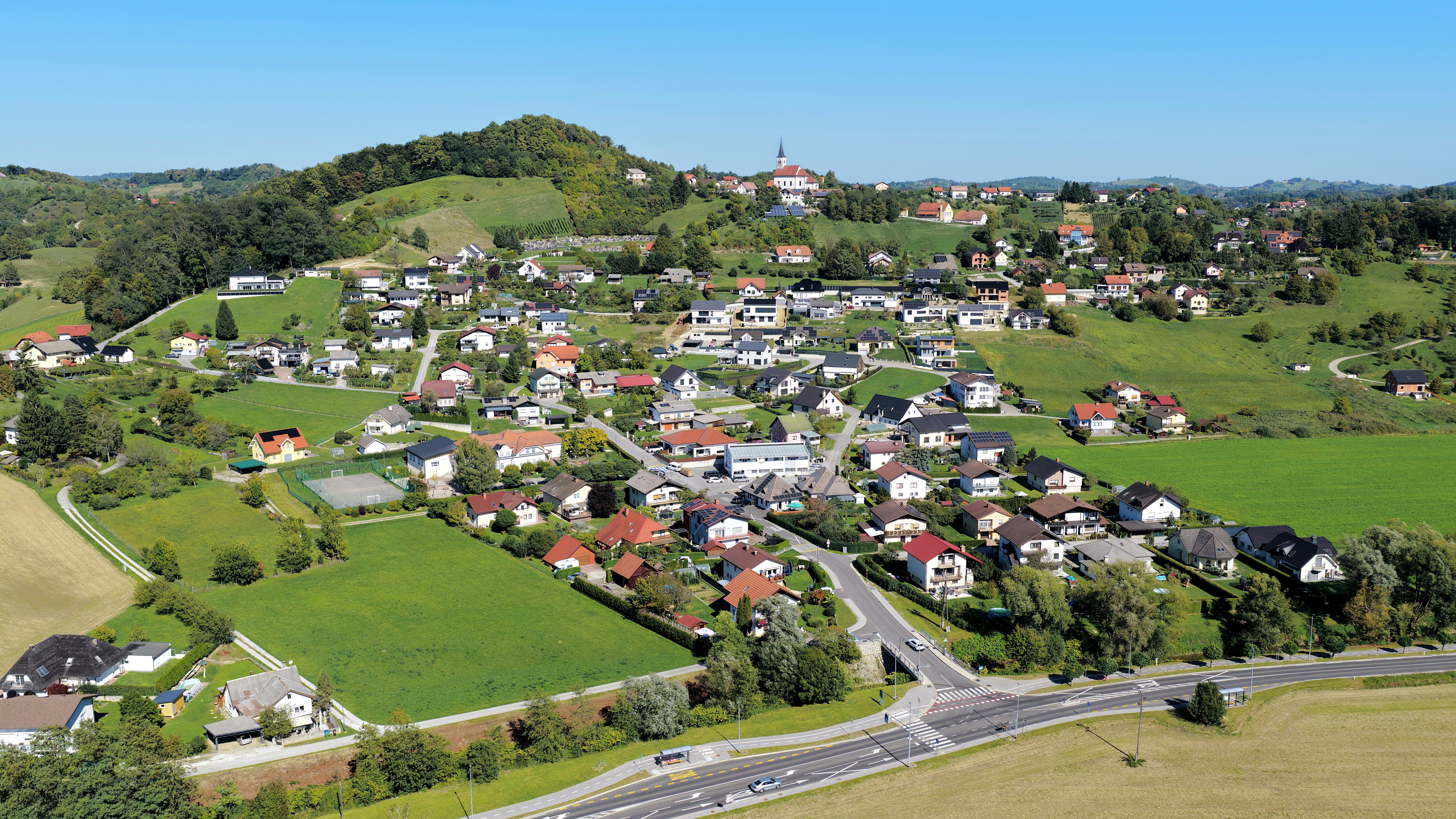
- Gradiška from the southwest

- Location in Slovenia
- Coordinates: 46°36′42.97″N 15°38′56.41″E
- Country: Slovenia
- Traditional region: Styria
- Statistical region: Drava
- Municipality: Kungota

Area
  - Total: 2.98 km^{2} (1.15 sq mi)
- Elevation: 278.2 m (913 ft)

Population (2002)
  - Total: 737

Gradiška (pronounced [ɡɾaˈdiːʃka]) is a settlement in the Municipality of Kungota in the western part of the Slovene Hills (Slovene: Slovenske gorice) in northeastern Slovenia.

The parish church in the village, located in the hamlet of Spodnja Kungota, is dedicated to Saint Cunigunde and belongs to the Roman Catholic Archdiocese of Maribor. It is built on a hill to the west of the main road from Maribor to Zgornja Kungota. The original church was built in the 13th century. The current building dates to 1673.
