= Zgornje Hlapje =

- Location in Slovenia
- Coordinates: 46°38′23.25″N 15°43′46.34″E
- Country: Slovenia
- Traditional region: Styria
- Statistical region: Drava
- Municipality: Pesnica

Area
  - Total: 2.04 km^{2} (0.79 sq mi)
- Elevation: 366.2 m (1,201 ft)

Population (2002)
  - Total: 169

Zgornje Hlapje (pronounced [ˈzɡoːɾnjɛ ˈxlaːpjɛ]) is a dispersed settlement in the Slovene Hills (Slovene: Slovenske gorice) in northeastern Slovenia. It belongs to the Municipality of Pesnica, traditionally part of Styria. The area is now included in the Drava Statistical Region.
