= Gradiška =

Gradiška may refer to:

- Gradiška, Bosnia and Herzegovina, a town in Republika Srpska, Bosnia and Herzegovina
- Stara Gradiška, a town in Croatia
- Nova Gradiška, a town in Croatia
- Gradiška, Kungota, a village in Slovenia
