= Municipality of Kungota =

Municipality of Slovenia

Municipality of Kungota Občina Kungota
- Municipality
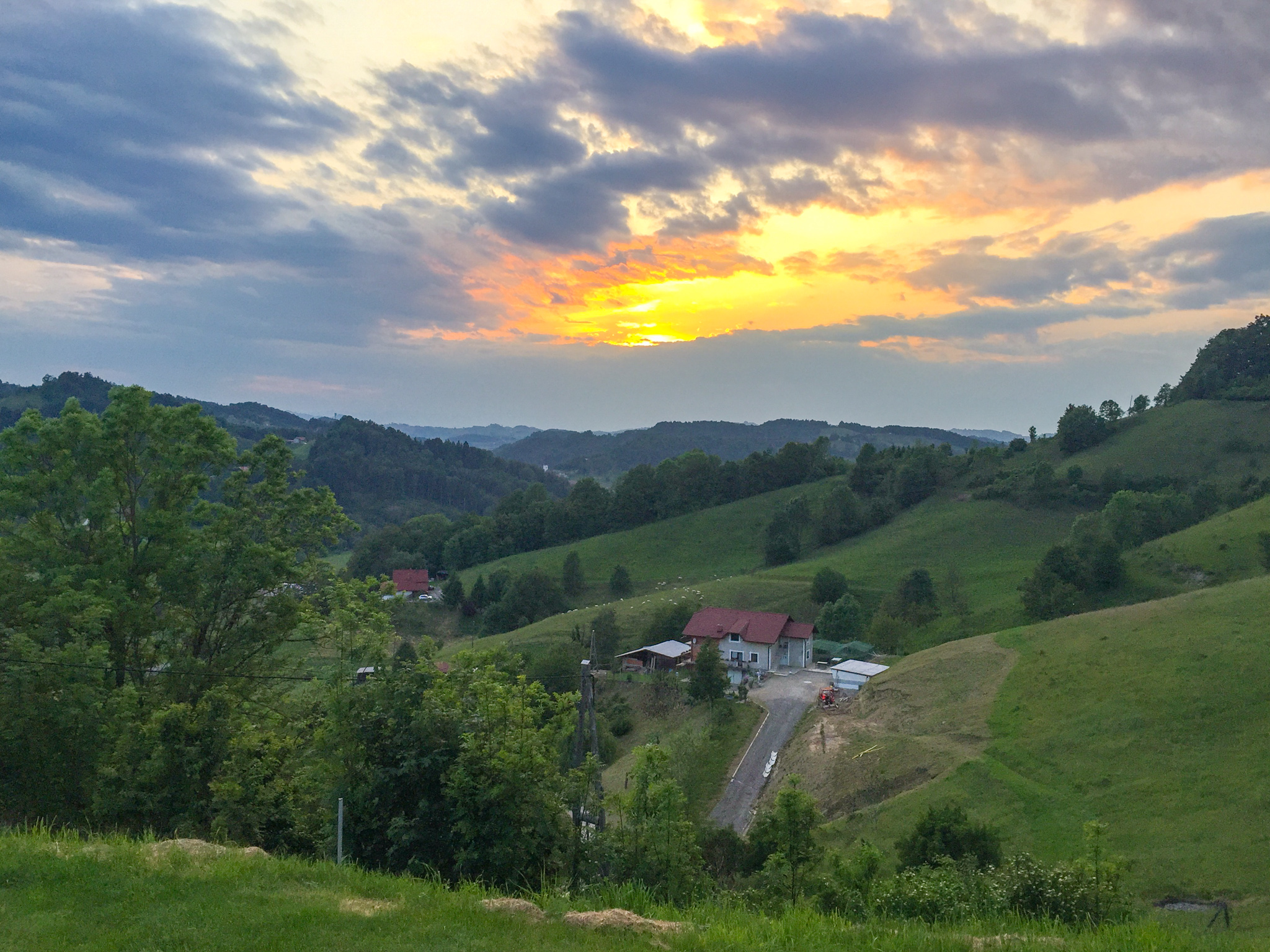

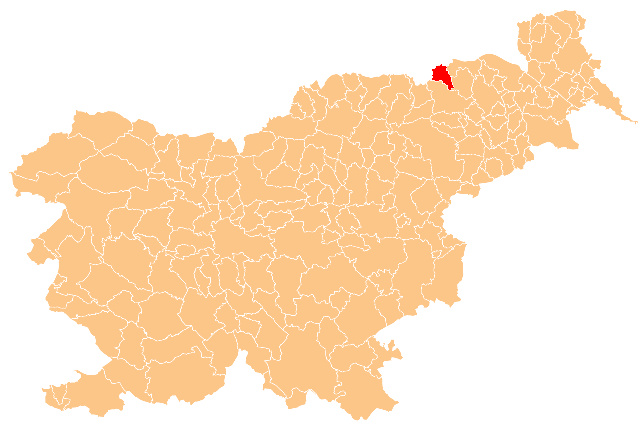
- Location of the Municipality of Kungota in Slovenia
- Coordinates: 46°25′N 15°47′E
- Country: Slovenia

Government
  - Mayor: Tamara Šnofl (Independent)

Area
  - Total: 49.0 km^{2} (18.9 sq mi)

Population (2002)
  - Total: 4,317
  - Density: 88.1/km^{2} (228/sq mi)
- Time zone: UTC+01 (CET)
  - Summer (DST): UTC+02 (CEST)
- Website: www.kungota.si

The Municipality of Kungota (pronounced [ˈkuːŋɡɔta]; Slovene: Občina Kungota) is a municipality in the western part of the Slovene Hills (Slovene: Slovenske gorice) in northeastern Slovenia. Its seat is the village of Zgornja Kungota. It borders Austria.

== Settlements ==
In addition to the municipal seat of Zgornja Kungota, the municipality also includes the following settlements:

- Ciringa
- Gradiška
- Grušena
- Jedlovnik
- Jurski Vrh
- Kozjak nad Pesnico
- Pesnica
- Plač
- Plintovec
- Podigrac
- Rošpoh
- Slatina
- Slatinski Dol
- Špičnik
- Spodnje Vrtiče
- Svečina
- Vršnik
- Zgornje Vrtiče
