= Ranca, Pesnica =

Ranca
- Location in Slovenia
- Coordinates: 46°37′31.46″N 15°40′9.39″E
- Country: Slovenia
- Traditional region: Styria
- Statistical region: Drava
- Municipality: Pesnica

Area
  - Total: 1.58 km^{2} (0.61 sq mi)
- Elevation: 270.8 m (888 ft)

Population (2002)
  - Total: 237

Ranca (pronounced [ˈɾaːntsa]) is a settlement in the Municipality of Pesnica in northeastern Slovenia. It lies in the Slovene Hills (Slovene: Slovenske gorice) just west of the old regional road from Maribor to Šentilj. The A1 motorway bypasses the settlement to the west and the main railway line runs along the eastern boundary of the settlement. The area is part of the traditional region of Styria. The municipality is now included in the Drava Statistical Region.

== Economy ==
Ranca is a wine-growing village.
