= Ciringa =

- Location in Slovenia
- Coordinates: 46°40′42.73″N 15°36′19.38″E
- Country: Slovenia
- Traditional region: Styria
- Statistical region: Drava
- Municipality: Kungota

Area
  - Total: 2.33 km^{2} (0.90 sq mi)
- Elevation: 312.4 m (1,025 ft)

Population (2014)
  - Total: 85

Ciringa (pronounced [ˈtsiːɾiŋɡa]) is a small dispersed settlement in the Municipality of Kungota in the western part of the Slovene Hills (Slovene: Slovenske gorice) in northeastern Slovenia, right on the border with Austria.
