= Polički Vrh =

- Location in Slovenia
- Coordinates: 46°38′56.08″N 15°41′43.08″E
- Country: Slovenia
- Traditional region: Styria
- Statistical region: Drava
- Municipality: Pesnica

Area
  - Total: 1.88 km^{2} (0.73 sq mi)
- Elevation: 298.9 m (981 ft)

Population (2002)
  - Total: 180

Polički Vrh (pronounced [pɔˈliːtʃki ˈʋəɾx]) is a settlement in the Municipality of Pesnica in northeastern Slovenia. It lies in the Slovene Hills (Slovene: Slovenske gorice), part of the traditional region of Styria. The municipality is now included in the Drava Statistical Region.

A large mansion in the south of the settlement known as the Jarenina Mansion (Slovene: Jareninski dvor) dates to the 17th century, but was mentioned in written documents dating to the late 11th century. Jarenina Creek (Slovene: Jareninski potok) flows through the village.
