= Drankovec =

- Location in Slovenia
- Coordinates: 46°37′15.79″N 15°44′0.47″E
- Country: Slovenia
- Traditional region: Styria
- Statistical region: Drava
- Municipality: Pesnica

Area
  - Total: 1.15 km^{2} (0.44 sq mi)
- Elevation: 286.6 m (940 ft)

Population (2002)
  - Total: 129

Drankovec (pronounced [ˈdɾaːŋkɔʋəts]) is a small settlement in the Municipality of Pesnica in northeastern Slovenia. It lies in the western part of the Slovene Hills (Slovene: Slovenske gorice). The area is part of the traditional region of Styria. It is now included in the Drava Statistical Region.
