= Jelenče =

- Location in Slovenia
- Coordinates: 46°38′12.27″N 15°40′9.42″E
- Country: Slovenia
- Traditional region: Styria
- Statistical region: Drava
- Municipality: Pesnica

Area
  - Total: 1.35 km^{2} (0.52 sq mi)
- Elevation: 265.5 m (871 ft)

Population (2002)
  - Total: 174

Jelenče (pronounced [jɛˈleːntʃɛ]) is a small settlement in the Municipality of Pesnica in northeastern Slovenia. It lies in the western part of the Slovene Hills (Slovene: Slovenske gorice). The area is part of the traditional region of Styria. The entire municipality is now included in the Drava Statistical Region.
