= Šetarova =

- Location in Slovenia
- Coordinates: 46°33′12.69″N 15°49′58.22″E
- Country: Slovenia
- Traditional region: Styria
- Statistical region: Drava
- Municipality: Lenart

Area
  - Total: 2.65 km^{2} (1.02 sq mi)
- Elevation: 231.9 m (761 ft)

Population (2002)
  - Total: 72

Šetarova (pronounced [ʃɛˈtaːɾɔʋa]; German: Schiltern) is a village in the Municipality of Lenart, in northeastern Slovenia. It lies on the left bank of the Pesnica River. The area is part of the traditional region of Styria. It is now included in the Drava Statistical Region.

A chapel with a belfry on a large cattle farm north of the settlement dates to the early 20th century. There is also a small roadside chapel in the center of the settlement.
