= Špičnik =

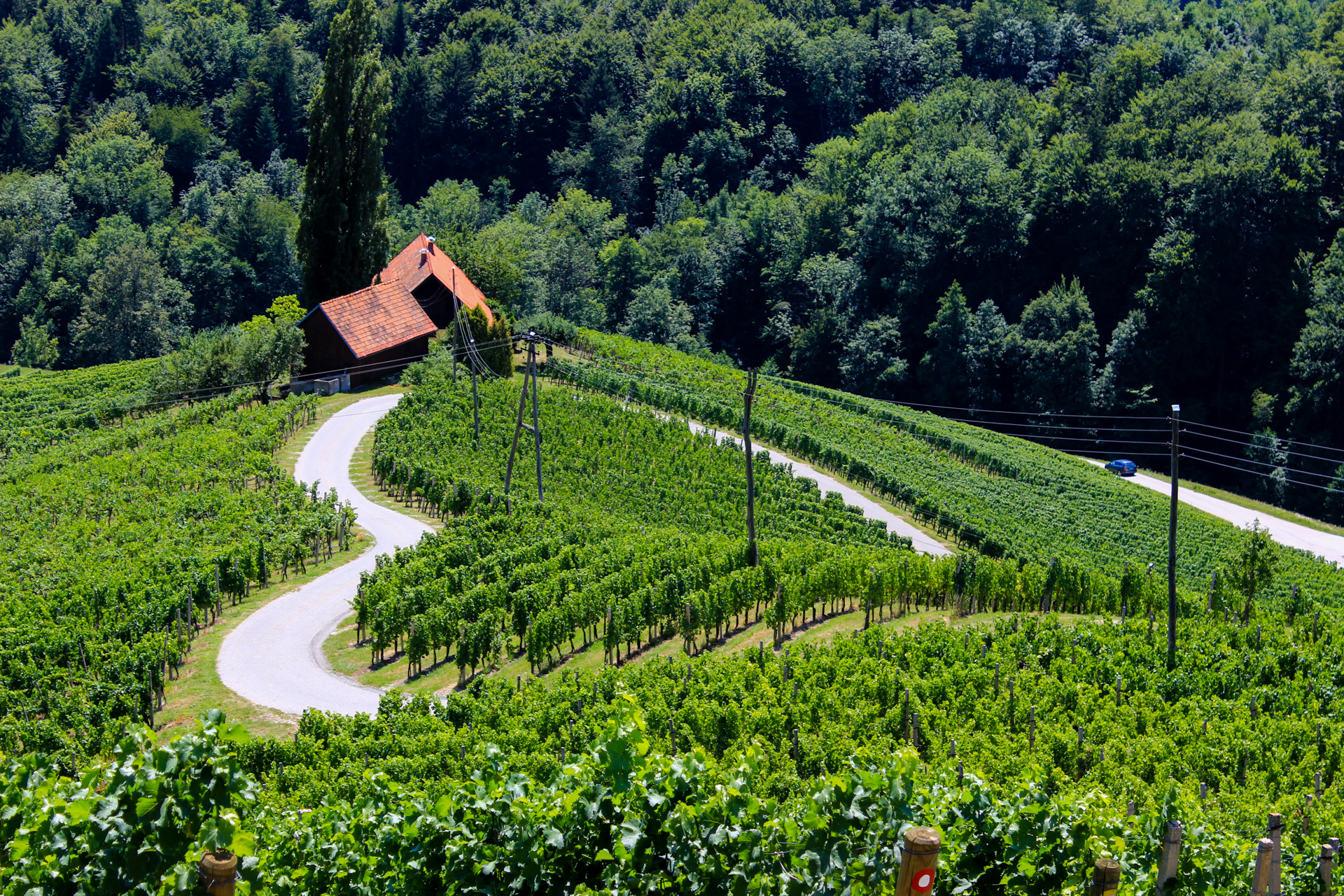

- Location in Slovenia
- Coordinates: 46°39′57.88″N 15°34′5.64″E
- Country: Slovenia
- Traditional region: Styria
- Statistical region: Drava
- Municipality: Kungota

Area
  - Total: 2.68 km^{2} (1.03 sq mi)
- Elevation: 339 m (1,112 ft)

Population (2002)
  - Total: 120

Špičnik (pronounced [ˈʃpiːtʃnik]) is a dispersed settlement in the western Slovene Hills (Slovene: Slovenske gorice) in the Municipality of Kungota in northeastern Slovenia, next to the border with Austria.
