= Slatina, Kungota =

Slatina
- Location in Slovenia
- Coordinates: 46°40′23.3″N 15°34′39.32″E
- Country: Slovenia
- Traditional region: Styria
- Statistical region: Drava
- Municipality: Kungota

Area
  - Total: 1.11 km^{2} (0.43 sq mi)
- Elevation: 377.2 m (1,238 ft)

Population (2002)
  - Total: 77

Slatina (pronounced [ˈslaːtina]) is a small dispersed settlement in the western Slovene Hills (Slovene: Slovenske gorice) in the Municipality of Kungota in northeastern Slovenia, right on the border with Austria.
