= Dolge Njive, Lenart =

Dolge Njive
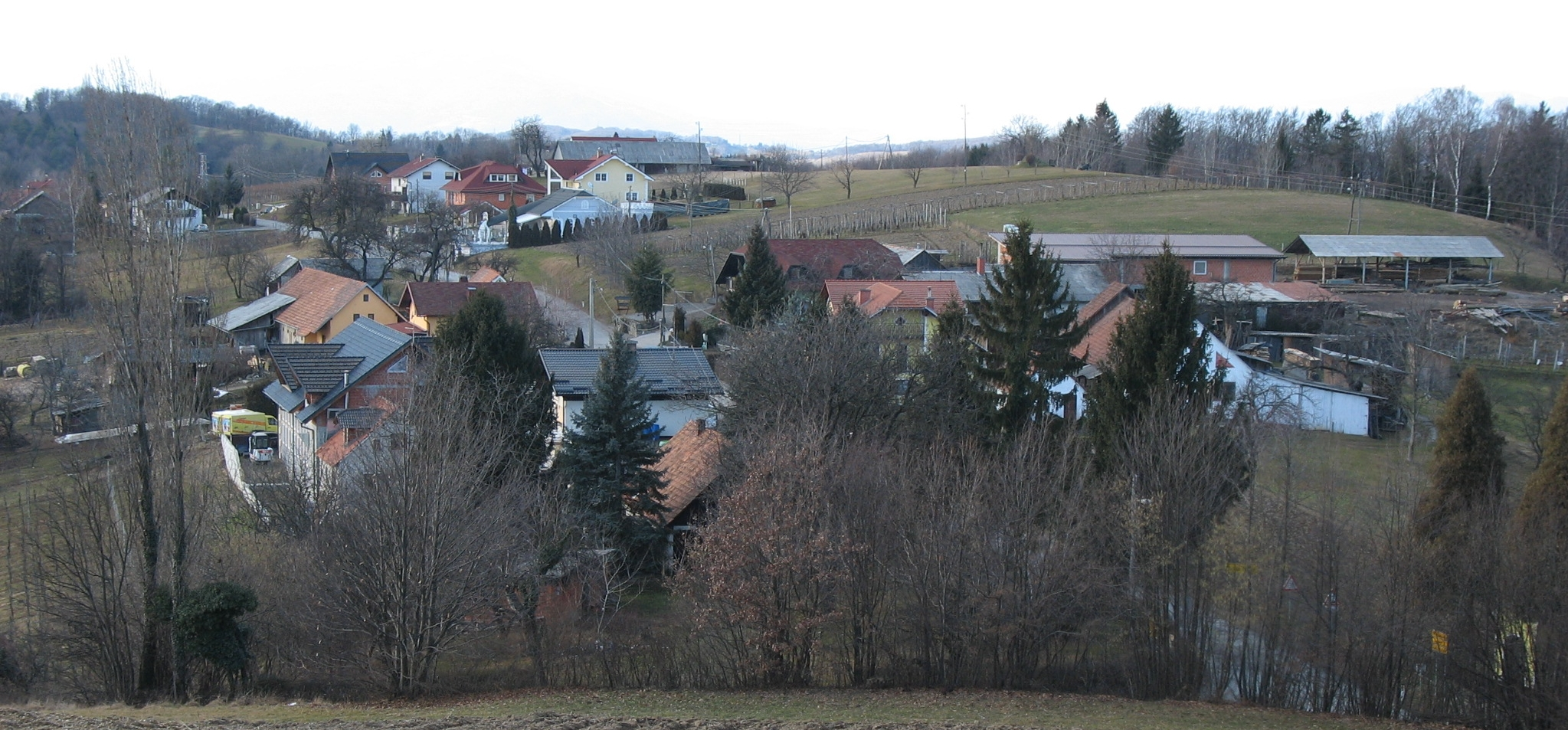
- Dolge Njive (2012)

- Location in Slovenia
- Coordinates: 46°31′44.25″N 15°48′30.05″E
- Country: Slovenia
- Traditional region: Styria
- Statistical region: Drava
- Municipality: Lenart

Area
  - Total: 0.64 km^{2} (0.25 sq mi)
- Elevation: 379 m (1,243 ft)

Population (2002)
  - Total: 121

Dolge Njive (pronounced [ˈdoːu̯ɡɛ ˈnjiːʋɛ]) is a settlement in the Slovene Hills (Slovene: Slovenske gorice) in the Municipality of Lenart in northeastern Slovenia. The area is part of the traditional region of Styria. It is now included in the Drava Statistical Region.

A small chapel in the settlement dates to the early 20th century.
