= Selce, Lenart =

Selce
- Location in Slovenia
- Coordinates: 46°31′33.35″N 15°48′59.92″E
- Country: Slovenia
- Traditional region: Styria
- Statistical region: Drava
- Municipality: Lenart

Area
  - Total: 5.79 km^{2} (2.24 sq mi)
- Elevation: 368.1 m (1,208 ft)

Population (2002)
  - Total: 370

Selce (pronounced [ˈseːltsɛ] or [ˈseːu̯tsɛ]) is a settlement in the Slovene Hills (Slovene: Slovenske gorice) in the Municipality of Lenart in northeastern Slovenia. The area is part of the traditional region of Styria. The entire municipality is now included in the Drava Statistical Region.
