= Zgornje Vrtiče =

- Location in Slovenia
- Coordinates: 46°39′54.74″N 15°36′54.98″E
- Country: Slovenia
- Traditional region: Styria
- Statistical region: Drava
- Municipality: Kungota

Area
  - Total: 1.29 km^{2} (0.50 sq mi)
- Elevation: 322.5 m (1,058 ft)

Population (2002)
  - Total: 69

Zgornje Vrtiče (pronounced [ˈzɡoːɾnjɛ ˈʋəɾtitʃɛ]) is a settlement in the Municipality of Kungota in the western part of the Slovene Hills (Slovene: Slovenske gorice) in northeastern Slovenia.
