= Spodnje Partinje =

- Location in Slovenia
- Coordinates: 46°34′55.14″N 15°47′26.66″E
- Country: Slovenia
- Traditional region: Styria
- Statistical region: Drava
- Municipality: Lenart

Area
  - Total: 1.69 km^{2} (0.65 sq mi)
- Elevation: 308.9 m (1,013 ft)

Population (2002)
  - Total: 135

Spodnje Partinje (pronounced [ˈspoːdnjɛ paɾˈtiːnjɛ], German: Unterpartin) is a small settlement in the Slovene Hills (Slovene: Slovenske gorice) in the Municipality of Lenart in northeastern Slovenia. The area is part of the traditional region of Styria and is now included in the Drava Statistical Region.
