= Mali Dol, Pesnica =

Mali Dol
- Location in Slovenia
- Coordinates: 46°37′57.9″N 15°44′0.1″E
- Country: Slovenia
- Traditional region: Styria
- Statistical region: Drava
- Municipality: Pesnica

Area
  - Total: 0.91 km^{2} (0.35 sq mi)
- Elevation: 277.2 m (909 ft)

Population (2002)
  - Total: 54

Mali Dol (pronounced [ˈmaːli ˈdoːl]) is a small settlement in the Slovene Hills (Slovene: Slovenske gorice) in northeastern Slovenia. It lies in the Municipality of Pesnica, part of the traditional region of Styria. The municipality is now included in the Drava Statistical Region.
