= Spodnja Voličina =

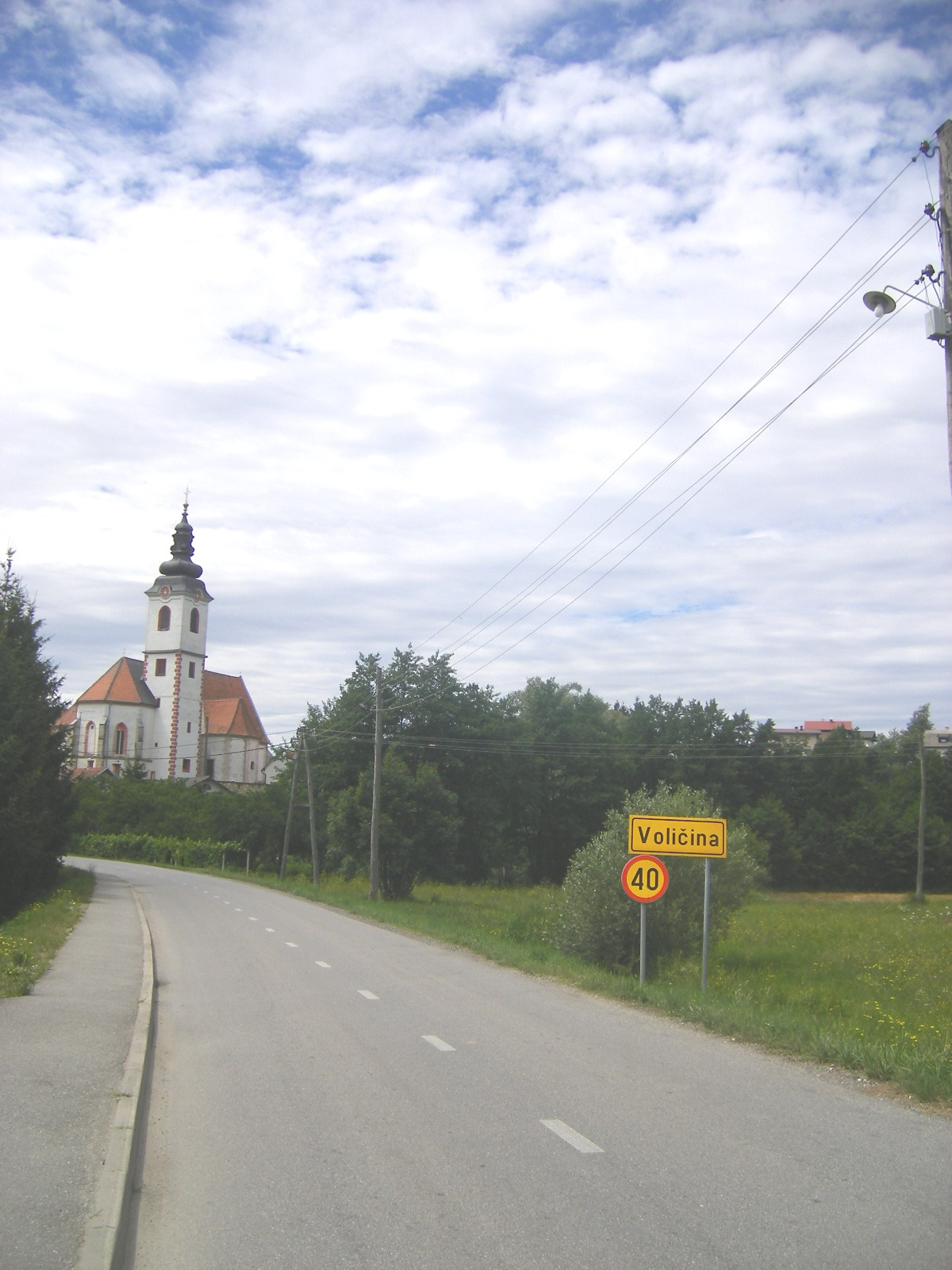
- Spodnja Voličina (2007)

- Location in Slovenia
- Coordinates: 46°32′10.33″N 15°48′51.56″E
- Country: Slovenia
- Traditional region: Styria
- Statistical region: Drava
- Municipality: Municipality of Lenart

Area
  - Total: 4.98 km^{2} (1.92 sq mi)
- Elevation: 328.7 m (1,078 ft)

Population (2002)
  - Total: 536

Spodnja Voličina (pronounced [ˈspoːdnja ʋɔˈliːtʃina], in older sources Spodnja Veličina, German: Unterwellitschen) is a settlement in the Municipality of Lenart in northeastern Slovenia. It lies in the valley of a minor right tributary of the Pesnica River. The area is part of the traditional region of Styria. It is now included in the Drava Statistical Region.

The parish church in the village is dedicated to Saint Rupert and belongs to the Roman Catholic Archdiocese of Maribor. It dates to the 14th century.
