= Spodnje Dobrenje =

- Location in Slovenia
- Coordinates: 46°37′21.64″N 15°39′30.72″E
- Country: Slovenia
- Traditional region: Styria
- Statistical region: Drava
- Municipality: Pesnica

Area
  - Total: 3.95 km^{2} (1.53 sq mi)
- Elevation: 264.9 m (869 ft)

Population (2002)
  - Total: 416

Spodnje Dobrenje (pronounced [ˈspoːdnjɛ dɔˈbɾeːnjɛ]) is a dispersed settlement in the Municipality of Pesnica in northeastern Slovenia. It lies in the Slovene Hills (Slovene: Slovenske gorice). The area is part of the traditional region of Styria. The municipality is now included in the Drava Statistical Region.

The A1 motorway runs through the entire length of the settlement.
