= Straže =

- Location in Slovenia
- Coordinates: 46°30′44.38″N 15°49′53.61″E
- Country: Slovenia
- Traditional region: Styria
- Statistical region: Drava
- Municipality: Lenart

Area
  - Total: 0.72 km^{2} (0.28 sq mi)
- Elevation: 354 m (1,161 ft)

Population (2002)
  - Total: 96

Straže (pronounced [stɾaˈʒeː]) is a small settlement in the Slovene Hills (Slovene: Slovenske gorice) in the Municipality of Lenart in northeastern Slovenia. The area is part of the traditional region of Styria. It is now included in the Drava Statistical Region.

A 6 m plague column in the settlement dates to 1712.
