= Dolnja Počehova =

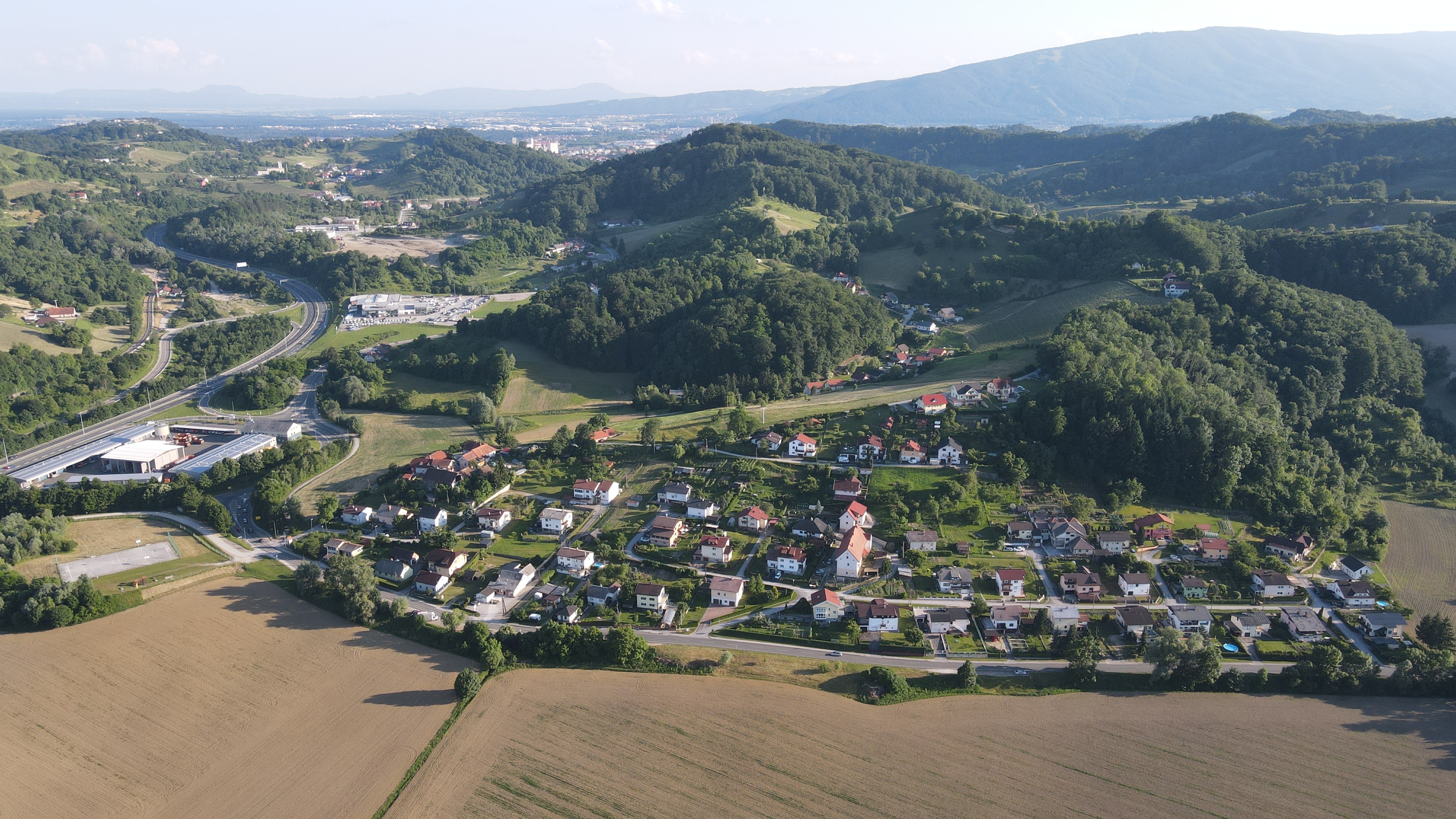

- Location in Slovenia
- Coordinates: 46°35′45.05″N 15°39′44.58″E
- Country: Slovenia
- Traditional region: Styria
- Statistical region: Drava
- Municipality: Pesnica

Area
  - Total: 2.62 km^{2} (1.01 sq mi)
- Elevation: 283.3 m (929 ft)

Population (2002)
  - Total: 344

Dolnja Počehova (pronounced [ˈdoːlnja pɔtʃɛˈxɔːʋa] or [ˈdoːlnja pɔtʃɛˈxoːʋa]) is a settlement in the Municipality of Pesnica in northeastern Slovenia. It lies in the Upper Pesnica Valley. The area is part of the traditional region of Styria. It is now included in the Drava Statistical Region.

A small roadside chapel-shrine in the settlement dates to 1775.
