= Ročica =

- Location in Slovenia
- Coordinates: 46°38′22.49″N 15°44′53.57″E
- Country: Slovenia
- Traditional region: Styria
- Statistical region: Drava
- Municipality: Pesnica

Area
  - Total: 3.86 km^{2} (1.49 sq mi)
- Elevation: 328.6 m (1,078 ft)

Population (2002)
  - Total: 269

Ročica (pronounced [ɾɔˈtʃiːtsa]) is a settlement in the Slovene Hills (Slovene: Slovenske gorice) in northeastern Slovenia. It lies in the Municipality of Pesnica. The area is part of the traditional region of Styria. The entire Municipality of Pesnica is now included in the Drava Statistical Region.
