= Slatnik (mountain) =

Mountain in Slovenia

- Location within Slovenia

Highest point
- Elevation: 1,598 m (5,243 ft)
- Coordinates: 46°14′07″N 13°59′55″E

Geography
- Location: Slovenia

Slatnik (pronounced [ˈslaːtnik]) is a 1,598-meter (5,243 ft) mountain in northwestern Slovenia. It stands southwest of the Sorica Plateau.

== Name ==
The name Slatnik appears in Slovenia as both an oronym and a settlement name (e.g., Slatnik, Veliki Slatnik, etc.). Like related names (e.g., Slatenik), it is derived from the common noun slatina 'spring with salty or acidic water', referring to a local geographical feature.
