= Flekušek =

- Location in Slovenia
- Coordinates: 46°36′49.18″N 15°44′7.63″E
- Country: Slovenia
- Traditional region: Styria
- Statistical region: Drava
- Municipality: Pesnica

Area
  - Total: 1.37 km^{2} (0.53 sq mi)
- Elevation: 313.6 m (1,029 ft)

Population (2002)
  - Total: 90

Flekušek (pronounced [ˈfleːkuʃək]) is a settlement in the western part of the Slovene Hills (Slovene: Slovenske gorice) in northeastern Slovenia. It lies in the Municipality of Pesnica. The area is part of the traditional region of Styria. It is now included in the Drava Statistical Region.
