= Spodnje Hlapje =

- Location in Slovenia
- Coordinates: 46°38′44.72″N 15°44′21.43″E
- Country: Slovenia
- Traditional region: Styria
- Statistical region: Drava
- Municipality: Pesnica

Area
  - Total: 1.29 km^{2} (0.50 sq mi)
- Elevation: 366.7 m (1,203 ft)

Population (2002)
  - Total: 98

Spodnje Hlapje (pronounced [ˈspoːdnjɛ ˈxlaːpjɛ]) is a settlement in the Slovene Hills (Slovene: Slovenske gorice) in the Municipality of Pesnica in northeastern Slovenia. The area is part of the traditional region of Styria. The municipality is now included in the Drava Statistical Region.

A small chapel in the settlement dates to 1914.
