= Administrative units of Slovenia =

Second-level division in Slovenia

Administrative units (Slovene: Upravna enota; plural: Upravne enote) are a second-level division of the executive branch of the Slovenian government. They were established on January 1st 1995 to perform the tasks of state administration which must be organised and performed uniformly across all administrative units in Slovenia. The areas covered by administrative units are designated in such a way as to enable cost-effectiveness and efficiency in performing administrative tasks. One administrative unit area generally corresponds to the area of one or several municipalities.

There are 58 administrative units, each is named after its respective municipal base of the government office. Administrative units usually have local branch offices to serve smaller communities.

They are the continuation of the 62 municipalities before 1994 (Ljubljana was until then split in five municipalities: Bežigrad, Center, Moste-Polje, Šiška and Vič-Rudnik, all of which were merged into one Ljubljana administrative unit).

== List of administrative units ==
Administrative unit	Area (km^{2})	Population (2026)	Administrative seat	Number of municipalities
Ajdovščina	353	25,907	Ajdovščina	2
Brežice	268	24,447	Brežice	1
Celje	230	66,216	Celje	4
Cerknica	483	16,940	Cerknica	3
Črnomelj	486	17,982	Črnomelj	2
Domžale	240	63,118	Domžale	5
Dravograd	105	8,814	Dravograd	1
Gornja Radgona	214	20,034	Gornja Radgona	4
Grosuplje	464	44,432	Grosuplje	3
Hrastnik	56	8,767	Hrastnik	1
Idrija	425	15,883	Idrija	2
Ilirska Bistrica	480	13,113	Ilirska Bistrica	1
Izola/Isola	29	16,419	Izola	1
Jesenice	375	31,484	Jesenice	3
Kamnik	290	36,659	Kamnik	2
Kočevje	648	16,520	Kočevje	3
Koper/Capodistria	311	58,450	Koper	2
Kranj	453	85,000	Kranj	6
Krško	345	28,717	Krško	2
Laško	249	16,992	Laško	2
Lenart	205	20,520	Lenart v Slovenskih Goricah	6
Lendava/Lendva	257	21,715	Lendava	7
Litija	322	22,080	Litija	2
Ljubljana	904	382,676	Ljubljana	7
Ljutomer	175	16,930	Ljutomer	4
Logatec	173	15,191	Logatec	1
Maribor	356	155,503	Maribor	7
Metlika	109	8,568	Metlika	1
Mozirje	508	16,355	Mozirje	7
Murska Sobota	692	54,079	Murska Sobota	12
Nova Gorica	605	58,239	Nova Gorica	6
Novo Mesto	760	68,491	Novo Mesto	8
Ormož	212	15,545	Ormož	3
Pesnica	171	19,725	Pesnica pri Mariboru	3
Piran/Pirano	45	18,187	Lucija	1
Postojna	493	23,448	Postojna	2
Ptuj	645	70,238	Ptuj	16
Radlje ob Dravi	346	15,380	Radlje ob Dravi	5
Radovljica	641	35,313	Radovljica	4
Ravne na Koroškem	304	24,331	Ravne na Koroškem	4
Ribnica	338	13,962	Ribnica	3
Ruše	209	14,484	Ruše	3
Sevnica	290	18,331	Sevnica	2
Sežana	660	27,320	Sežana	4
Slovenj Gradec	286	21,598	Slovenj Gradec	2
Slovenska Bistrica	386	37,061	Slovenska Bistrica	4
Slovenske Konjice	224	24,407	Slovenske Konjice	3
Šentjur pri Celju	240	20,701	Šentjur	2
Škofja Loka	512	43,378	Škofja Loka	4
Šmarje pri Jelšah	400	33,373	Šmarje pri Jelšah	6
Tolmin	939	17,701	Tolmin	3
Trbovlje	58	15,876	Trbovlje	1
Trebnje	317	23,073	Trebnje	4
Tržič	155	15,020	Tržič	1
Velenje	197	46,350	Velenje	3
Vrhnika	169	26,870	Vrhnika	1
Zagorje ob Savi	147	16,314	Zagorje ob Savi	1
Žalec	334	44,524	Žalec	6
