= Počenik =

- Location in Slovenia
- Coordinates: 46°39′17.1″N 15°44′22.34″E
- Country: Slovenia
- Traditional region: Styria
- Statistical region: Drava
- Municipality: Pesnica

Area
  - Total: 2.61 km^{2} (1.01 sq mi)
- Elevation: 354.1 m (1,162 ft)

Population (2002)
  - Total: 113

Počenik (pronounced [ˈpoːtʃɛnik]) is a settlement in the Municipality of Pesnica in northeastern Slovenia. It lies in the Slovene Hills (Slovene: Slovenske gorice) and is part of the traditional region of Styria. The municipality is now included in the Drava Statistical Region.
