= Črmljenšak =

- Location in Slovenia
- Coordinates: 46°31′58.51″N 15°50′43.55″E
- Country: Slovenia
- Traditional region: Styria
- Statistical region: Drava
- Municipality: Lenart

Area
  - Total: 2.37 km^{2} (0.92 sq mi)
- Elevation: 330.9 m (1,086 ft)

Population (2002)
  - Total: 196

Črmljenšak (pronounced [tʃəɾˈmleːnʃak], in older sources Čermlenšak, German: Tschermlenscheg) is a settlement in the Slovene Hills (Slovene: Slovenske gorice) in the Municipality of Lenart in northeastern Slovenia. The area is part of the traditional region of Styria. It is now included in the Drava Statistical Region.

There are two small chapels in the settlement. One is a Neo-Gothic building dating to the late 19th century. The second was built in 1919.
