= Municipality of Lenart =

Municipality of Slovenia

Municipality of Lenart Občina Lenart
- Municipality
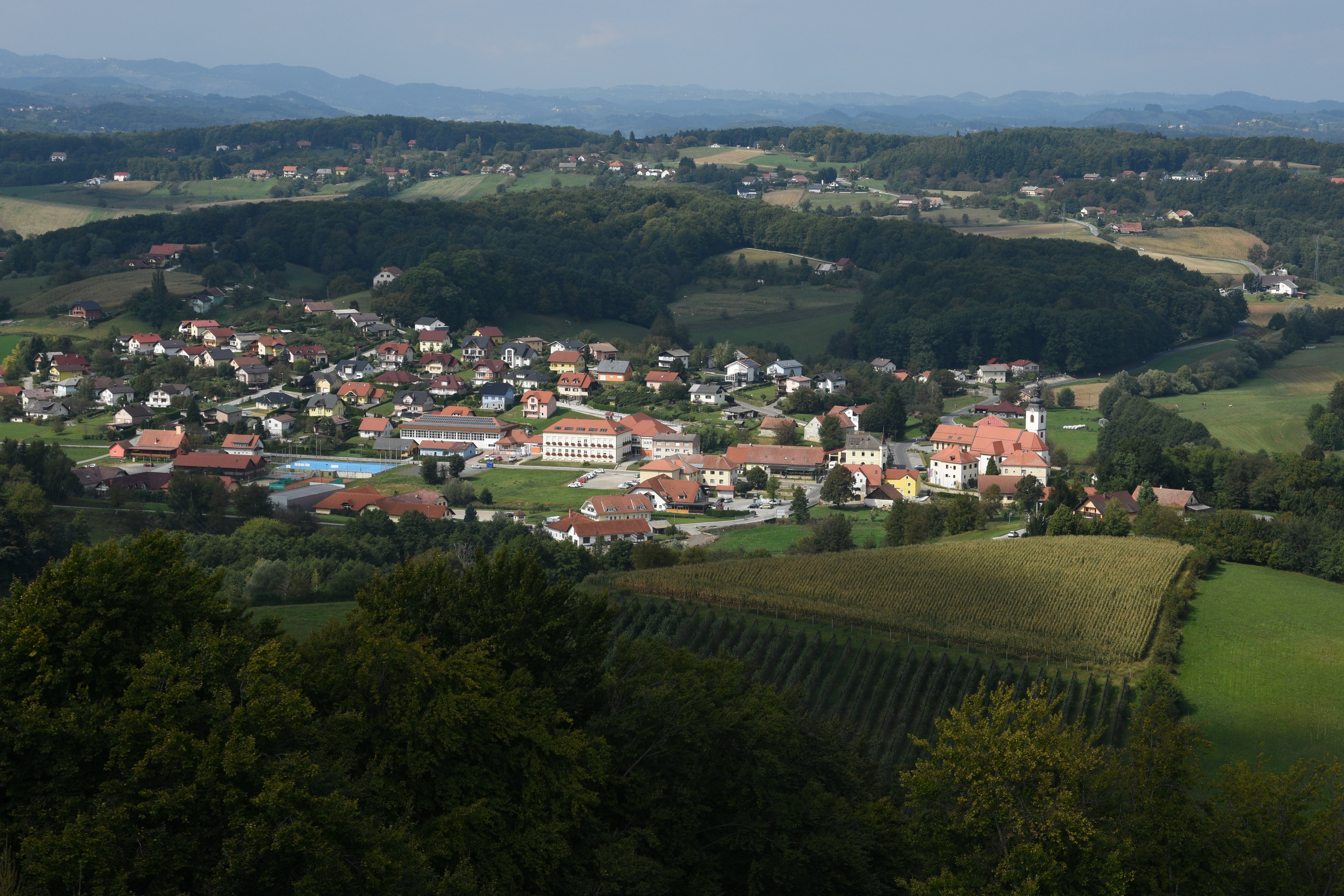

- Coat of arms

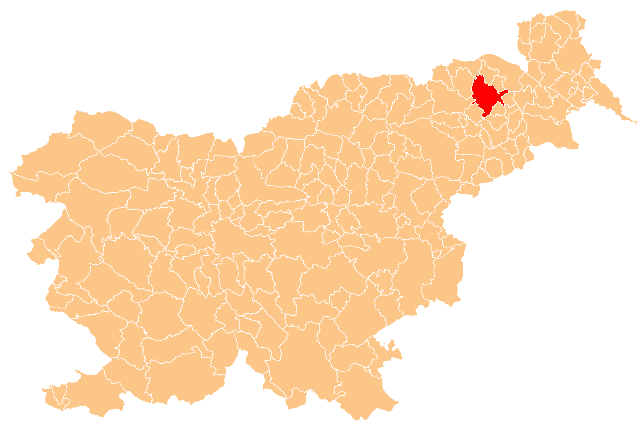
- Location of the Municipality of Lenart in Slovenia
- Coordinates: 46°34′27″N 15°49′56″E
- Country: Slovenia

Government
  - Mayor: Janez Kramberger (Independent)

Area
  - Total: 62 km^{2} (24 sq mi)

Population (2012)
  - Total: 8,157
  - Density: 130/km^{2} (340/sq mi)
- Time zone: UTC+01 (CET)
  - Summer (DST): UTC+02 (CEST)
- Website: www.lenart.si

The Municipality of Lenart (pronounced [ˈleːnaɾt]; Slovene: Občina Lenart) is a municipality in northeastern Slovenia. It has just over 11,000 inhabitants. It is considered the centre of the Slovene Hills (Slovene: Slovenske gorice). The area is part of the traditional region of Styria. It is now included in the Drava Statistical Region. The seat of the municipality is Lenart v Slovenskih Goricah.

== Settlements ==
In addition to the municipal seat of Lenart v Slovenskih Goricah, the municipality also includes the following settlements:

- Črmljenšak
- Dolge Njive
- Gradenšak
- Hrastovec v Slovenskih Goricah
- Lormanje
- Močna
- Nadbišec
- Radehova
- Rogoznica
- Selce
- Šetarova
- Spodnja Voličina
- Spodnje Partinje
- Spodnji Porčič
- Spodnji Žerjavci
- Straže
- Vinička Vas
- Zamarkova
- Zavrh
- Zgornja Voličina
- Zgornji Žerjavci
