= Plač =

- Location in Slovenia
- Coordinates: 46°39′53.6″N 15°35′23.22″E
- Country: Slovenia
- Traditional region: Styria
- Statistical region: Drava
- Municipality: Kungota

Area
  - Total: 2.67 km^{2} (1.03 sq mi)
- Elevation: 300.1 m (985 ft)

Population (2002)
  - Total: 144

Plač (pronounced [ˈplaːtʃ]) is a settlement in the Municipality of Kungota in the western part of the Slovene Hills (Slovene: Slovenske gorice) in northeastern Slovenia.

The parish church in the village is dedicated to Saint Andrew and belongs to the Roman Catholic Archdiocese of Maribor. The church was first mentioned in written documents dating to 1197. The current building dates to between 1652 and 1657 with some details of the Gothic building still visible. The belfry dates to the 19th century.
