= Vosek, Pesnica =

Vosek
- Location in Slovenia
- Coordinates: 46°35′50.91″N 15°42′51.99″E
- Country: Slovenia
- Traditional region: Styria
- Statistical region: Drava
- Municipality: Pesnica

Area
  - Total: 3.2 km^{2} (1.2 sq mi)
- Elevation: 310.6 m (1,019 ft)

Population (2002)
  - Total: 326

Vosek (pronounced [ˈʋoːsək]; German: Waschenberg) is a settlement in the Municipality of Pesnica in northeastern Slovenia. It lies on the left bank of the Pesnica River. The area is part of the traditional region of Styria. The municipality is now included in the Drava Statistical Region. Jarenina Creek (Slovene: Jareninski potok) empties into Lake Pernica (Slovene: Perniško jezero) in the northeastern part of the settlement.

A small chapel in the settlement dates to 1889.
