= Lormanje =

- Location in Slovenia
- Coordinates: 46°33′57.03″N 15°49′18.05″E
- Country: Slovenia
- Traditional region: Styria
- Statistical region: Drava
- Municipality: Lenart

Area
  - Total: 3.73 km^{2} (1.44 sq mi)
- Elevation: 239.4 m (785 ft)

Population (2002)
  - Total: 164

Lormanje (pronounced [ˈloːɾmanjɛ]) is a settlement in the Municipality of Lenart in northeastern Slovenia. The area is part of the traditional region of Styria. It is now included in the Drava Statistical Region.

Traces of Roman period buildings and a burial ground with burial mounds have been identified near the settlement.
