= Ščuke pa ni, ščuke pa ne =

- Genre: comedy
- Created by: Tone Partljič
- Directed by: Jože Babič
- Starring: Danilo Bezlaj; Milena Muhič; Danilo Benedečič; Angela Janko; Janez Klasinc; Breda Pugelj; Minu Kjuder; Janez Hočevar
- Composer: Krunoslav Cipci
- Country of origin: Yugoslavia
- Original language: Slovene
- No. of seasons: 1
- No. of episodes: 7

Production
- Executive producer: Igor Pobegajlo
- Running time: 50 minutes

Original release
- Network: Ljubljana 1
- Release: 1980

Ščuke pa ni, ščuke pa ne (English: literally: Esox is not there, Esox is not) is a Slovenian television comedy series, created by Slovenian writer Tone Partljič and directed by Jože Babič.

The original show was aired in 1980 on first channel of RTV Ljubljana. Screenplay by Tone Partljič and music was composed by Krunoslav Cipci.

== Plot ==
The story was set in a town municipality office. Workers have a good boss, they don't have to work so hard. They gossip each other a lot, they have parties.

== Main characters ==
- Silvo Kremžar (Danilo Bezlaj)...an office manager
- Katica Kremžar (Milena Muhič)...Silvo's wife
- Klander (Danilo Benedečič)
- Štefka Klander (Angela Janko)...an office housekeeper
- Franc Karic (Janez Klasinc)
- Matilda Šmigoč (Breda Pugelj)
- Helena Jelenc (Minu Kjuder)...a crying, soft lady
- Fonza (Janez Hočevar)...an office telephone operator

== Episodes ==
No.	Title	Directed by	Written by
1	"Young journalist, A waterfall, An award"	Jože Babič	Tone Partljič
2	"Dialogues"	Jože Babič	Tone Partljič
3	"Carps are there, Esoxs are not"	Jože Babič	Tone Partljič
4	"Back to the Centre, back to Partisans"	Jože Babič	Tone Partljič
5	"A new manager, a new order"	Jože Babič	Tone Partljič
6	"A new show and manager's birthday"	Jože Babič	Tone Partljič
7	"Pregnancy, Rotation, A waterfall"	Jože Babič	Tone Partljič
