= Podigrac =

- Location in Slovenia
- Coordinates: 46°40′30.34″N 15°36′59.62″E
- Country: Slovenia
- Traditional region: Styria
- Statistical region: Drava
- Municipality: Kungota

Area
  - Total: 1.32 km^{2} (0.51 sq mi)
- Elevation: 331 m (1,086 ft)

Population (2002)
  - Total: 68

Podigrac (pronounced [ˈpoːdiɡɾats]) is a dispersed settlement in the Municipality of Kungota in northeastern Slovenia, right on the border with Austria.
