= Polička Vas =

- Location in Slovenia
- Coordinates: 46°39′35.62″N 15°41′38.42″E
- Country: Slovenia
- Traditional region: Styria
- Statistical region: Drava
- Municipality: Pesnica

Area
  - Total: 2.89 km^{2} (1.12 sq mi)
- Elevation: 340.1 m (1,116 ft)

Population (2002)
  - Total: 196

Polička Vas (pronounced [pɔˈliːtʃka ˈʋaːs]; Slovene: Polička vas) is a settlement in the Slovene Hills (Slovene: Slovenske gorice) in northeastern Slovenia. It lies in the Municipality of Pesnica. The area is part of the traditional region of Styria. The municipality is now included in the Drava Statistical Region.
