= Spodnji Jakobski Dol =

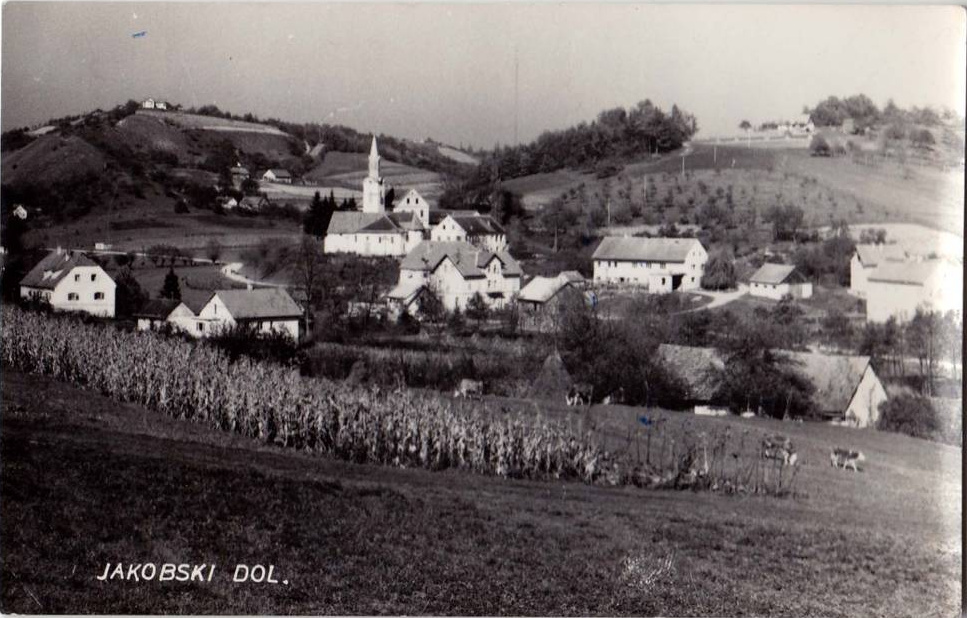
- 1969 postcard of Jakobski Dol

- Location in Slovenia
- Coordinates: 46°37′42.95″N 15°44′7.89″E
- Country: Slovenia
- Traditional region: Styria
- Statistical region: Drava
- Municipality: Pesnica

Area
  - Total: 4.11 km^{2} (1.59 sq mi)
- Elevation: 270.3 m (887 ft)

Population (2016)
  - Total: 348

Spodnji Jakobski Dol (pronounced [ˈspoːdnji ˈjaːkɔbski ˈdoːl], German: Unterjakobsthal) is a settlement in the Municipality of Pesnica in northeastern Slovenia. It lies in the Slovene Hills (Slovene: Slovenske gorice), part of the traditional region of Styria. The municipality is now included in the Drava Statistical Region.

The parish church in the settlement is dedicated to Saint James (Slovene: sveti Jakob) and belongs to the Roman Catholic Archdiocese of Maribor. It is a Gothic structure dating to the 14th century that was extensively restyled in 1635.
