= Radehova =

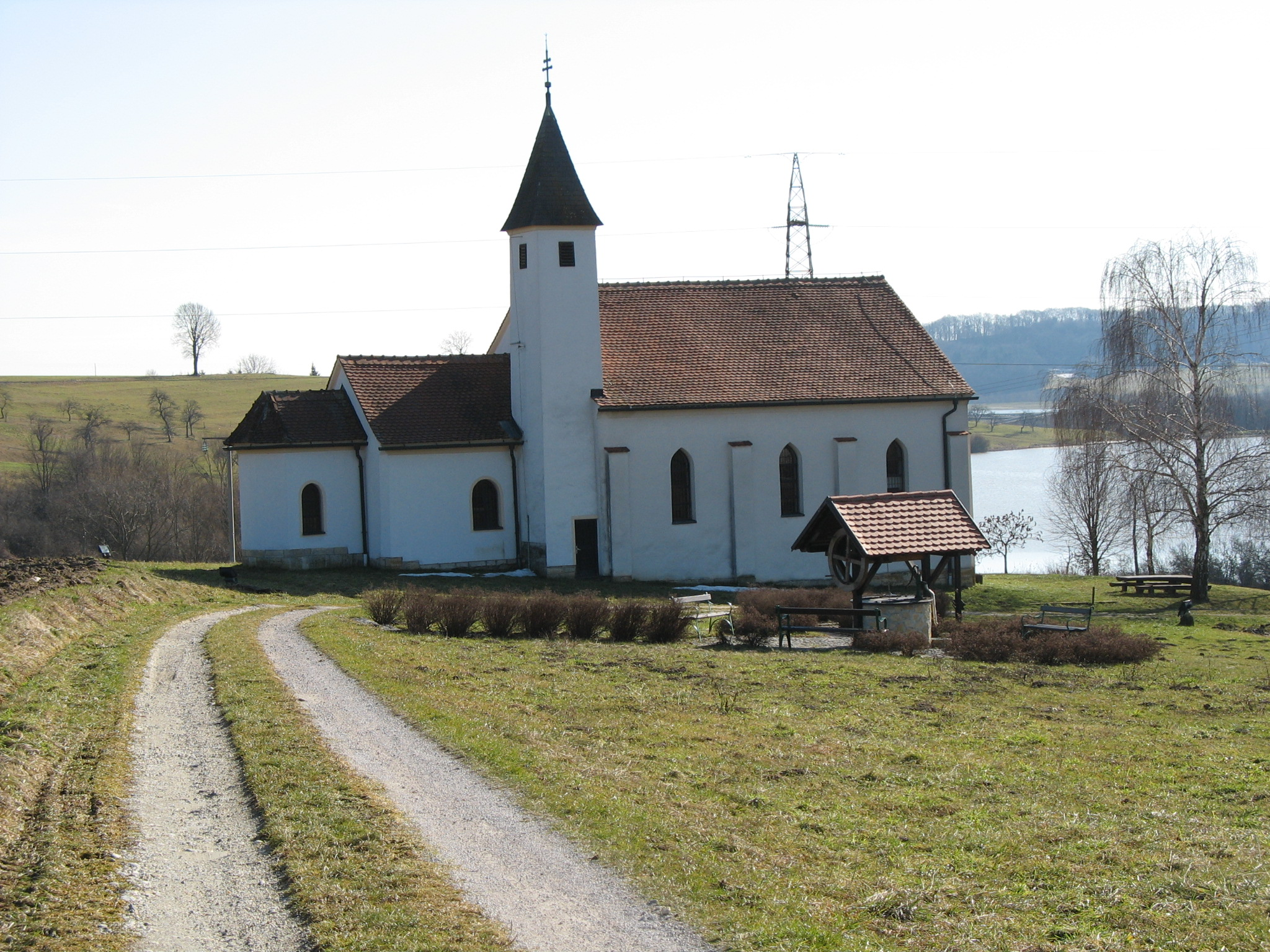

- Location in Slovenia
- Coordinates: 46°34′1.27″N 15°51′24.91″E
- Country: Slovenia
- Traditional region: Styria
- Statistical region: Drava
- Municipality: Lenart

Area
  - Total: 2.54 km^{2} (0.98 sq mi)
- Elevation: 235.4 m (772 ft)

Population (2002)
  - Total: 164

Radehova (pronounced [ˈɾaːdɛxɔʋa]; German: Radach) is a settlement in the Municipality of Lenart in northeastern Slovenia. The area is part of the traditional region of Styria. It is now included in the Drava Statistical Region.

A chapel next to Lake Radehova west of the settlement is dedicated to the Virgin Mary and belongs to the Parish of Lenart. It dates to the 17th century and was extended in the 19th century.
