= Jurski Vrh =

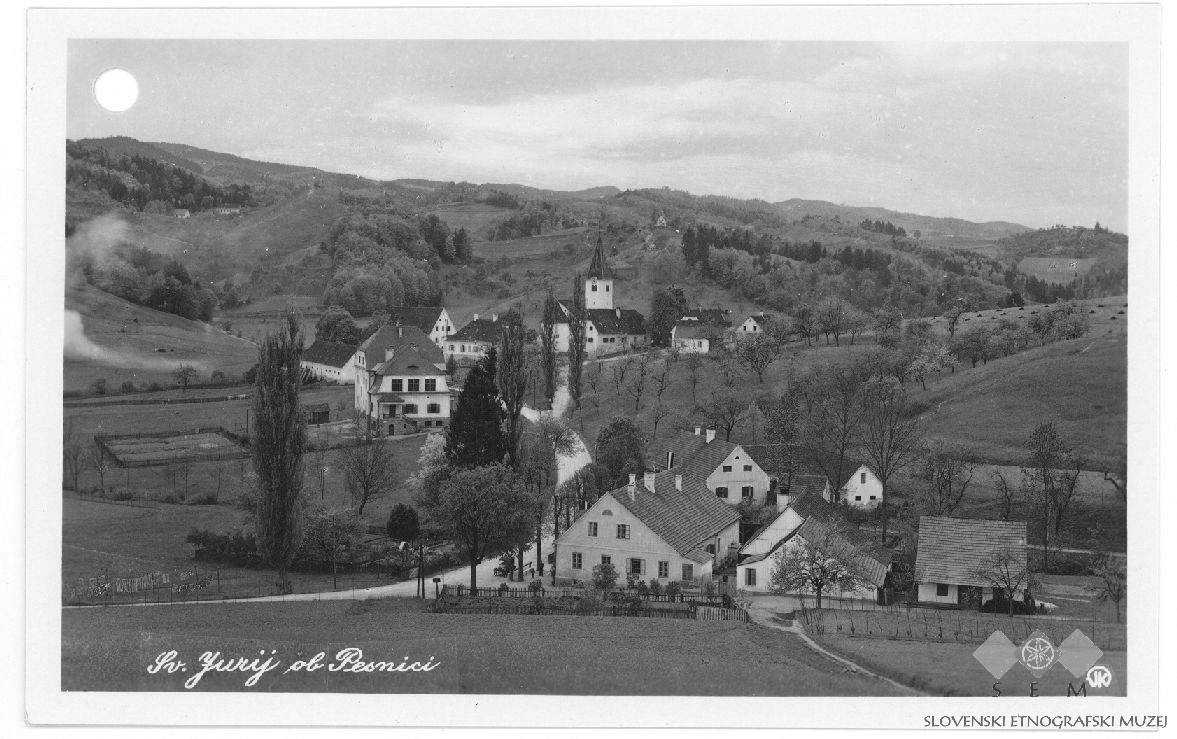
- Postcard of Jurski Vrh

- Location in Slovenia
- Coordinates: 46°38′46.65″N 15°34′2.54″E
- Country: Slovenia
- Traditional region: Styria
- Statistical region: Drava
- Municipality: Kungota

Area
  - Total: 2.06 km^{2} (0.80 sq mi)
- Elevation: 307.8 m (1,010 ft)

Population (2002)
  - Total: 136

Jurski Vrh (pronounced [ˈjuːɾski ˈʋəɾx]) is a settlement in the Municipality of Kungota in the western part of the Slovene Hills (Slovene: Slovenske gorice) in northeastern Slovenia, right on the border with Austria. It includes the hamlet of Jurij ob Pesnici, on the left bank of the Pesnica River, as well as the dispersed houses in the hills north of the village.

== Church ==
The parish church, from which the village gets its name, is dedicated to Saint George (Slovene: sveti Jurij) and belongs to the Roman Catholic Archdiocese of Maribor. It stands in the centre of the village on the north side of the main road. The church was first mentioned in written documents dating to 1383. The current building dates to the 16th century and is a typical example of Gothic architecture of the region with a single nave. It was renovated in the 17th century and in 1855, and contains Baroque internal furnishings. The date 1532 appears on the belfry.
