= Ložane =

- Location in Slovenia
- Coordinates: 46°34′16.91″N 15°44′14.96″E
- Country: Slovenia
- Traditional region: Styria
- Statistical region: Drava
- Municipality: Pesnica

Area
  - Total: 2.07 km^{2} (0.80 sq mi)
- Elevation: 248.8 m (816 ft)

Population (2002)
  - Total: 89

Ložane (pronounced [ˈloːʒanɛ]; German: Lasach) is a settlement in the Municipality of Pesnica in northeastern Slovenia. It is part of the traditional region of Styria. The entire municipality is now included in the Drava Statistical Region.

Four intact Roman-period burial mounds have been identified near the settlement.
