= Andreas Perlach =

Court astrologer to Archduke Ferdinand

Andreas Perlach, also known as Andreas Perlacher and Andreas Perlachius ex Wittschein Stiriensis, (1490–1551) was born in Svečina, in the Habsburg empire (now in Slovenia). Perlach was the court astrologer to Archduke Ferdinand, later Ferdinand I, Holy Roman Emperor, in addition to being a practicing physician and a lecturer of mathematics and astrology at the University of Vienna. He received his doctorate of medicine from the University of Vienna in 1530.

Perlach is notable for his support of the use of almanacs, having lectured on their importance and usage. His lectures were printed in outline form in 1519 and in full commentary in 1551. He also composed annual astrological almanacs for most of his career.

Perlach lectured on mathematics from 1515 to 1549 as well as astrology and its application in medicine. He became dean of the Faculty of Arts, was appointed four times as dean of the Medical Faculty in Vienna, and as chancellor of the University of Vienna in 1549. His tombstone is built into the wall of the St. Stephen's Cathedral in Vienna.
