= Hrastovec v Slovenskih Goricah =

Settlement in Styria, Slovenia

- Location in Slovenia
- Coordinates: 46°33′55.29″N 15°47′16.87″E
- Country: Slovenia
- Traditional region: Styria
- Statistical region: Drava
- Municipality: Lenart

Area
  - Total: 2.09 km^{2} (0.81 sq mi)
- Elevation: 242.8 m (797 ft)

Population (2002)
  - Total: 116

Hrastovec v Slovenskih Goricah (pronounced [ˈxɾaːstɔʋəts ʍ slɔˈʋeːnskiɣ ɡɔˈɾiːtsax], German: Gutenhaag) is a settlement in the Slovene Hills (Slovene: Slovenske gorice) in the Municipality of Lenart in northeastern Slovenia. The area is part of the traditional region of Styria. It is now included in the Drava Statistical Region.

== Hrastovec Castle ==
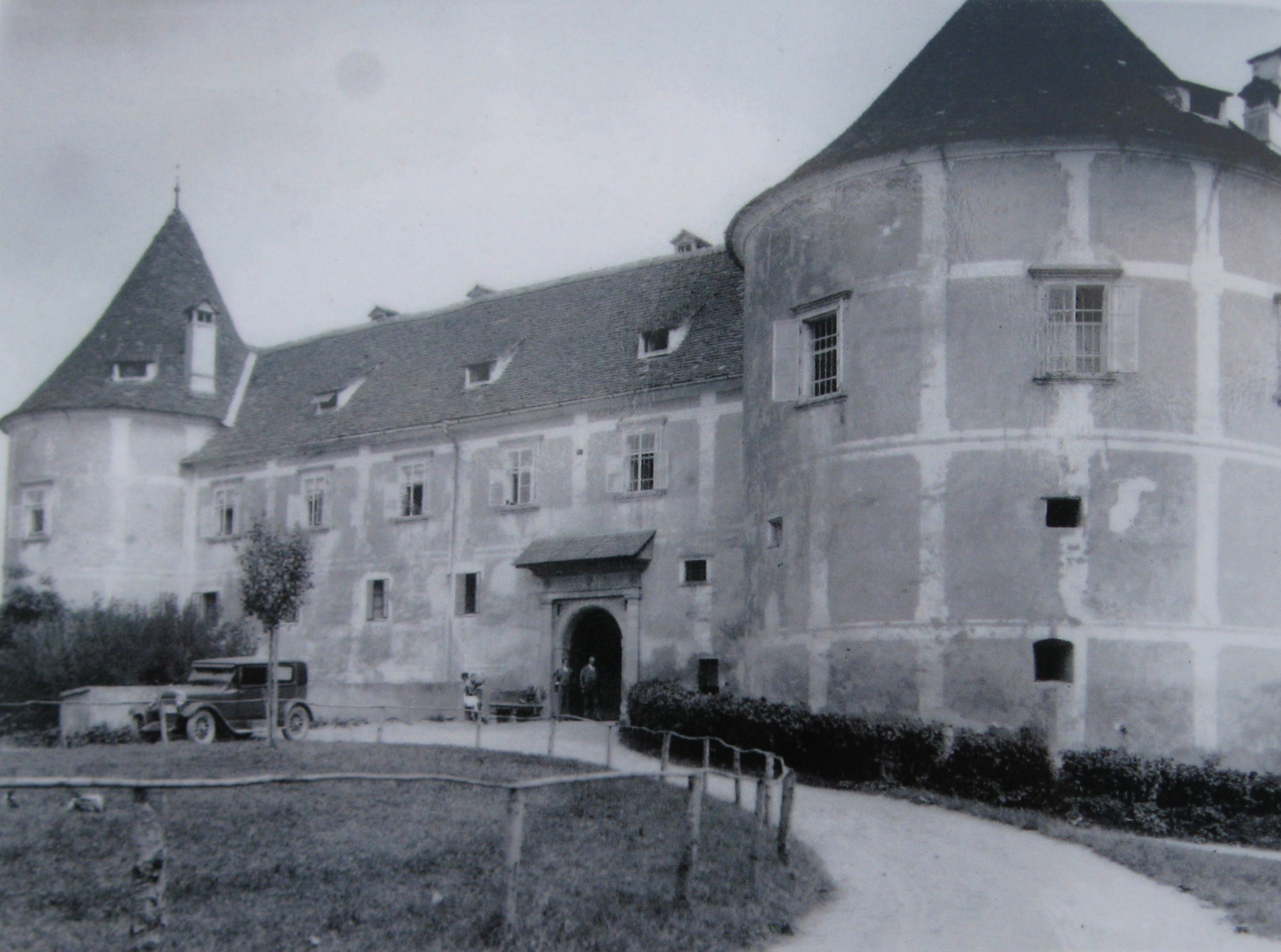
Hrastovec Castle (1930)

The dominant landmark in the settlement is Hrastovec Castle. It is a castle dating to the early 13th century with various later stages. It has a number of well-preserved Baroque features, including a painted chapel. It is one of the largest surviving castles in Slovenia. It houses a psychiatric hospital.

After World War II, the castle was the site of an internment camp run by the Yugoslav secret police for people accused of collaborating with the Germans.
