= Tone Partljič =

Slovenian writer and politician

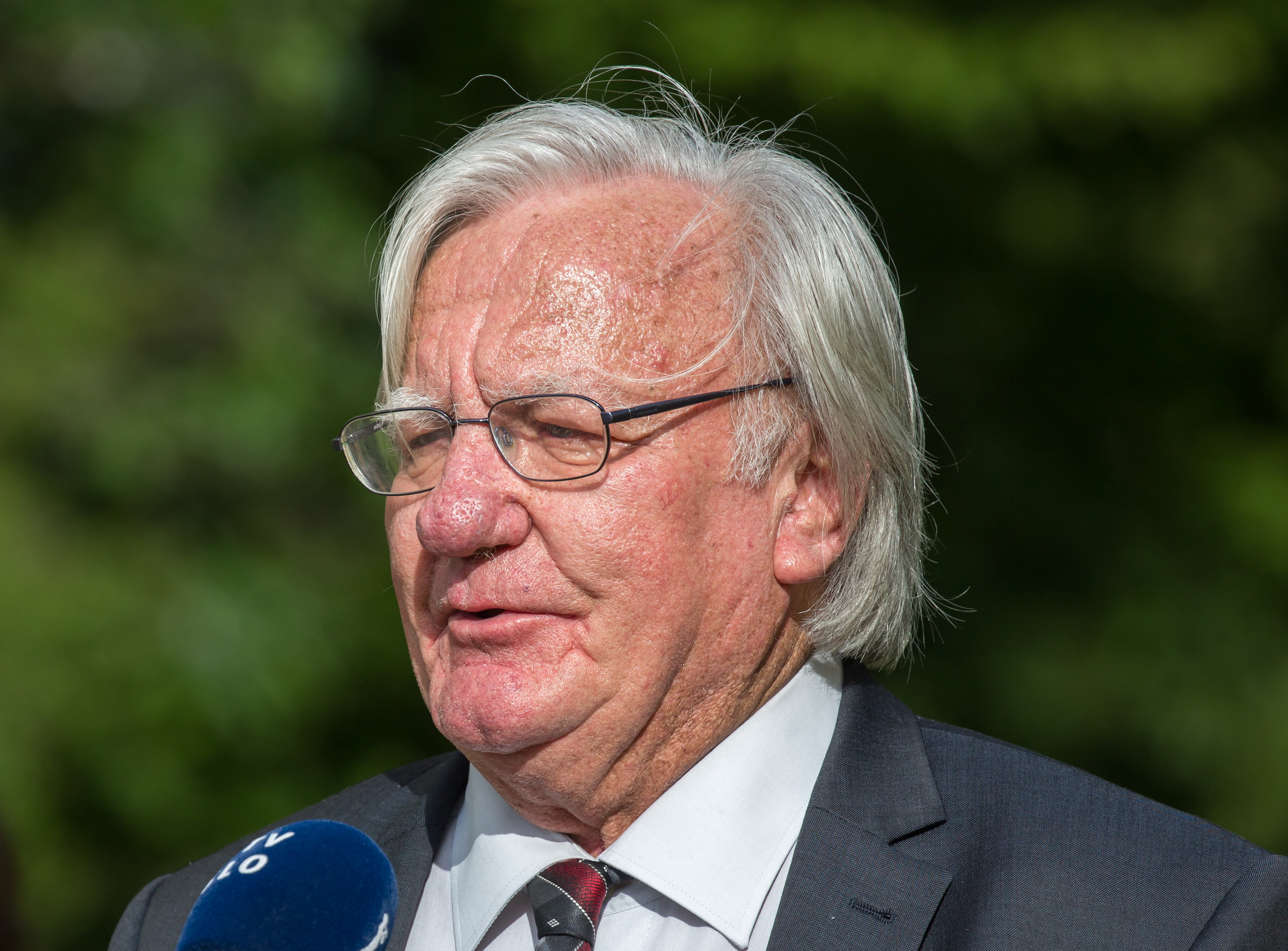
- Partljič in 2020
- Born: 5 August 1940 (age 86); Maribor, Drava Banovina, Kingdom of Yugoslavia (now in Slovenia)
- Occupations: writer, playwright, screenwriter, politician
- Writing career
- Notable works: Moj ata, socialistični kulak; Hotel sem prijeti sonce
- Notable awards: Prešeren Award; 2016 lifetime achievement

Tone Partljič (born 5 August 1940) is a Slovene writer, playwright and politician. Between 1990 and 2004 he was a member of the Slovenian National Assembly, from 1994 as a member of the LDS party. He was also president of the Slovene Writers' Association between 1983 and 1987.

== Early life and education ==
Partljič was born in Maribor and grew up in Pesnica pri Mariboru. He studied in Maribor and graduated in Slovene and English language in 1965 and worked as a teacher and then as a dramaturge and artistic director at the Slovene National Theatre and the Ljubljana City Theatre. In 1980 he won the Prešeren Foundation Award for his satirical comedies. In 2016, he was given the Prešeren Award, the highest Slovenian award in the field of artistic creation, for lifetime achievement.

== Career ==
=== Literary and Theatrical Work ===
Partljič began his career as a writer and playwright in the 1960s. His works are characterized by humor, satire, and a deep understanding of human nature, which resonated with Slovenian audiences. His early plays such as Moj ata, socialistični kulak ("My Dad, the Socialist Kulak") and Kdo vam je pa to delo ("Who Gave You This Work?") became significant in Slovenian theatre for their witty critique of societal norms and political life.

Partljič's body of work includes more than 40 plays, numerous short stories, novels, and screenplays.

== Published works ==
=== Plays ===
- Ribe na plitvini, (1968)
- Naj poje čuk, (1971)
- Tolmun in kamen, (1972)
- Ščuke pa ni, (1973)
- Oskubite jastreba, (1977)
- Nekoč in danes,(1979)
- Za koga naj še molim?,(1980)
- Taki ste, take smo, (1980)
- Nasvidenje nad zvezdami,(1981)
- O, ne, ščuke pa ne, (1982)
- Moj ata, socialistični kulak, (1983)
- Sekretar za humor, (1984)
- Rdeče in sinje med drevjem, (1985)
- Justifikacija, Mestno gledališče ljubljansko, (1986)
- Ščuka, da te kap, (1987)
- Pesnikova žena prihaja, (1989)
- Deni me kot pečat na svoje srce, (1990)
- Moj deda, socialistični mrtvak, (1991)
- Štajerc v Ljubljani, (1995)
- Politika, bolezen moja, (1996)
- Gospa poslančeva, (1996)
- Komedije, (1997)
- Maister in Marjeta, (1998)
- Čistilka Marija, (1998)
- En dan resnice, (1999)
- Krivica boli, (1999)
- Čaj za dve, (2001)
- Edelweis ali Denis in Ditka, (2001)
- Izbrane komedije, (2003)
- Poroka čistilke Marije, (2006)
- Zveze in partnerstva, (2007)
- Za nacionalni interes, (2007)

=== Prose ===
- Ne glej za pticami, (1967)
- Jalovost, (1971)
- Volk na madridskih ulicah, (1974)
- Nasvidenje nad zvezdami, (1982)
- Pepsi ali provincialni donjuan, (1987)
- Rdeče in sinje med drevjem, (1987)
- Kulturne humoreske, prosim, (1988)
- Prelesti, prelesti, Mladinska knjiga, (1990)
- Goool!: predvolilne humoreske, (1992)
- Mala, Prešernova družba, (1992)
- Pri Mariji Snežni zvoni, (1994)
- Starec za plotom, (1995)
- Samo roko daj, (1997)
- Pisatelj v parlamentu, (1998)
- Usodna privlačnost, (2001)
- Kampanja, (2002)
- Golaž, reka in mostovi, (2003)
- Grob pri Mariji Snežni, (2005)

=== Youth literature ===
- Hotel sem prijeti sonce, (1981)
- Slišal sem, kako trava raste, (1990)
- Dupleška mornarica, (1996)
- Maša in Tjaša, (1999)
- General: deset črtic o Rudolfu Maistru, (2006)

== Television ==
- Ščuke pa ni, ščuke pa ne (1980), Slovenian television comedy series
