= Pernica =

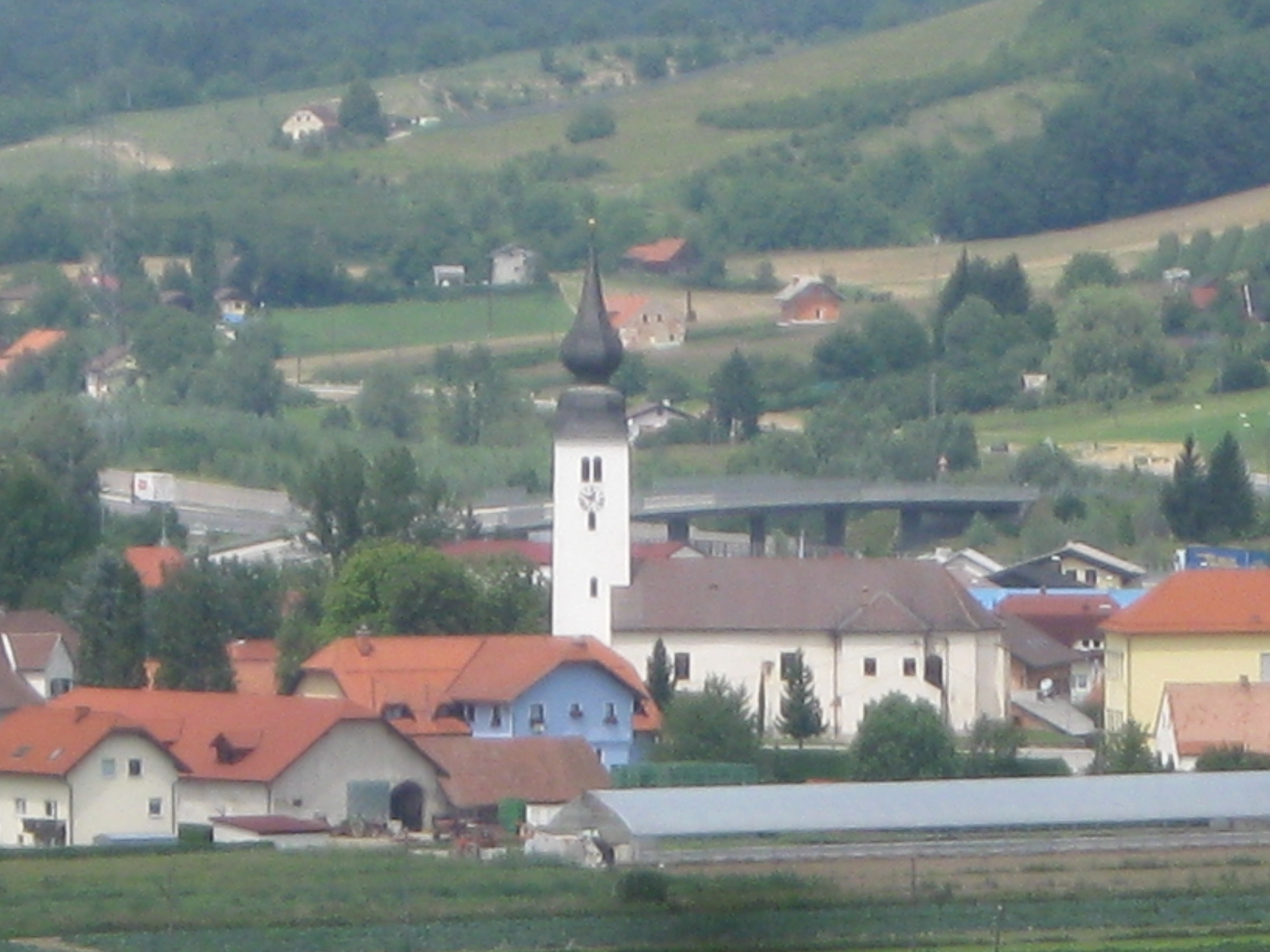

- Location in Slovenia
- Coordinates: 46°34′42.74″N 15°43′36.79″E
- Country: Slovenia
- Traditional region: Styria
- Statistical region: Drava
- Municipality: Pesnica

Area
  - Total: 2.52 km^{2} (0.97 sq mi)
- Elevation: 246.8 m (810 ft)

Population (2002)
  - Total: 377

Pernica (pronounced [ˈpeːɾnitsa]; German: Pernitzen) is a village in the Municipality of Pesnica in northeastern Slovenia. It lies in the traditional region of Styria. The municipality is now included in the Drava Statistical Region.

The parish church in the settlement is dedicated to Saint Margaret and belongs to the Roman Catholic Archdiocese of Maribor. It was first mentioned in written documents dating to 1361. It was destroyed in 1532 and rebuilt in 1567.
