= Jareninski Dol =

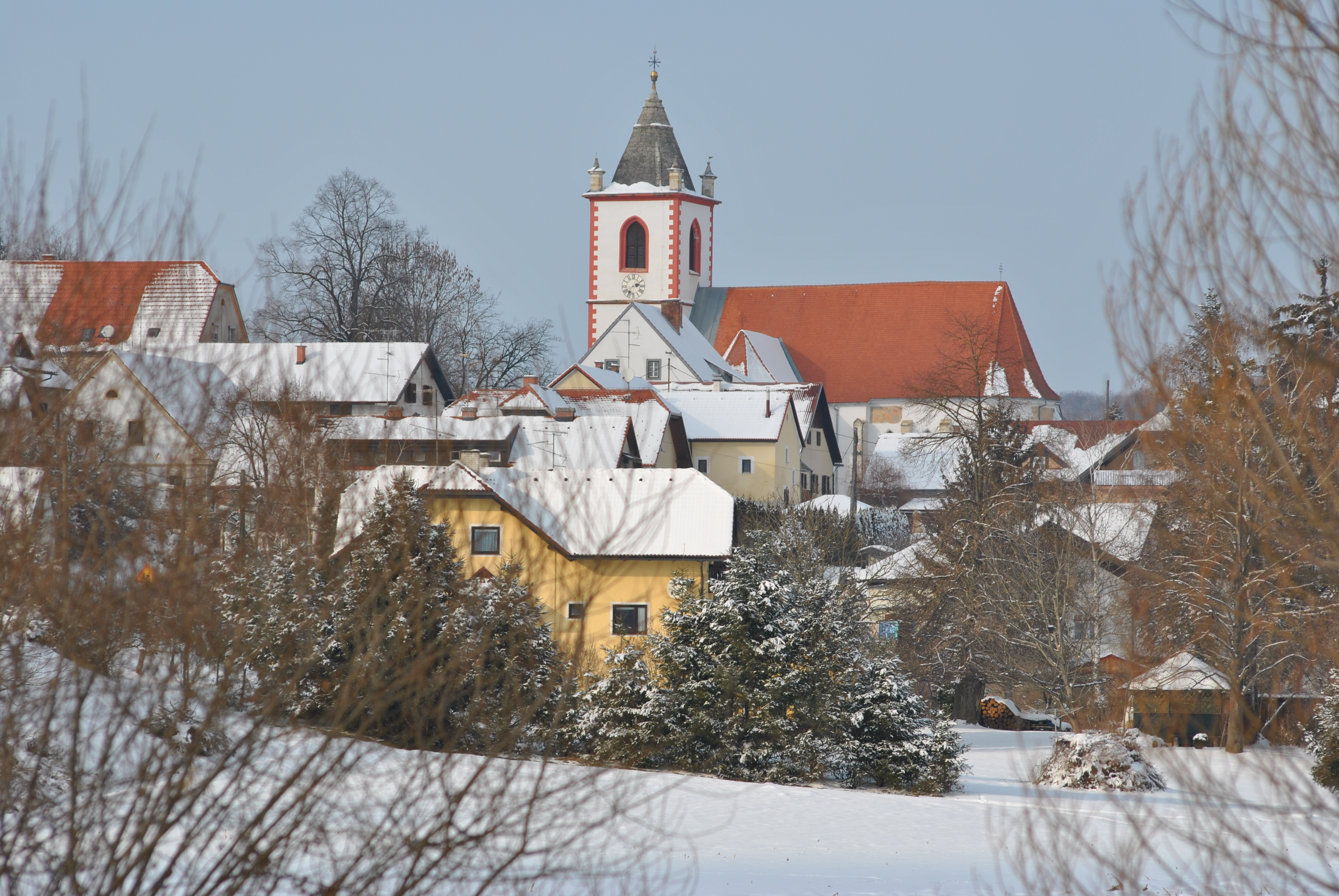
- Jareninski Dol in winter

- Location in Slovenia
- Coordinates: 46°37′44.45″N 15°41′52.04″E
- Country: Slovenia
- Traditional region: Styria
- Statistical region: Drava
- Municipality: Pesnica

Area
  - Total: 2.3 km^{2} (0.89 sq mi)
- Elevation: 284.8 m (934 ft)

Population (2002)
  - Total: 390

Jareninski Dol (pronounced [jaɾɛˈniːnski ˈdoːl], German: Jahringthal, locally known as Jarenina) is a village in the Municipality of Pesnica in northeastern Slovenia. It lies in the western part of the Slovene Hills (Slovene: Slovenske gorice). The area is part of the traditional region of Styria. It is now included in the Drava Statistical Region. Jarenina Creek (Slovene: Jareninski potok) flows through the settlement.

== Name ==
The name Jareninski Dol literally means 'Jarenina Valley'. The local name of the settlement, Jarenina, is said to derive from the common noun jarkovina 'clearing', referring to a trenched-out area.

== Church ==
The local parish church in the settlement is dedicated to the Assumption of Mary and belongs to the Roman Catholic Archdiocese of Maribor. It was first mentioned in written documents dating to 1135. Most of the current structure dates to the 16th century. An ossuary with a chapel dedicated to Saint Michael, dating to the 12th century, still survives near the church.
