= Pesnica pri Mariboru =

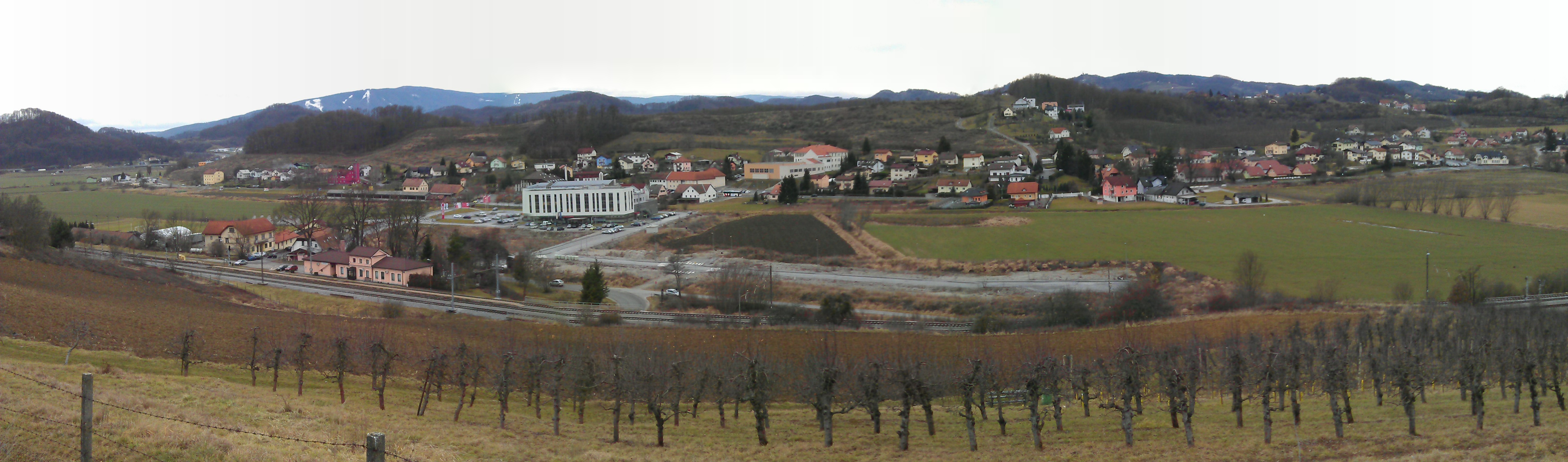

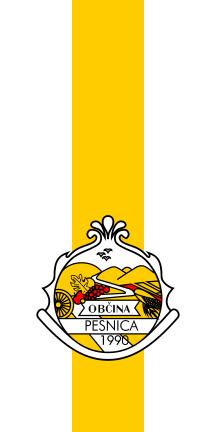
- Flag

- Location in Slovenia
- Coordinates: 46°36′35.74″N 15°40′17.02″E
- Country: Slovenia
- Traditional region: Styria
- Statistical region: Drava
- Municipality: Pesnica

Area
  - Total: 3.2 km^{2} (1.2 sq mi)
- Elevation: 266 m (873 ft)

Population (2016)
  - Total: 843
  - Density: 260/km^{2} (670/sq mi)
- Vehicle registration: MB
- Climate: Cfb

Pesnica pri Mariboru (pronounced [ˈpéːsnitsa pɾi ˈmáːɾibɔɾu]; German: Pößnitzhofen) is a settlement in northeastern Slovenia. It is the administrative centre of the Municipality of Pesnica.

== History ==
The settlement started to develop with the arrival of the railway in the 19th century, and particularly developed after World War II. After 1945, Pesnica became the centre of the western Slovene Hills. The elementary school and preschool in Pesnica were built by the Germans during the war. Since 1994, Pesnica has been the seat of the Styria Technological Park.

== Notable people ==
Notable people that were born or lived in Pesnica include:

- Jan Muršak (born 1988), hockey player
- Tone Partljič (born 1940), writer, screenwriter, and politician
- Ivo Štandeker (1961–1992), writer and journalist
