= Zgornja Kungota =

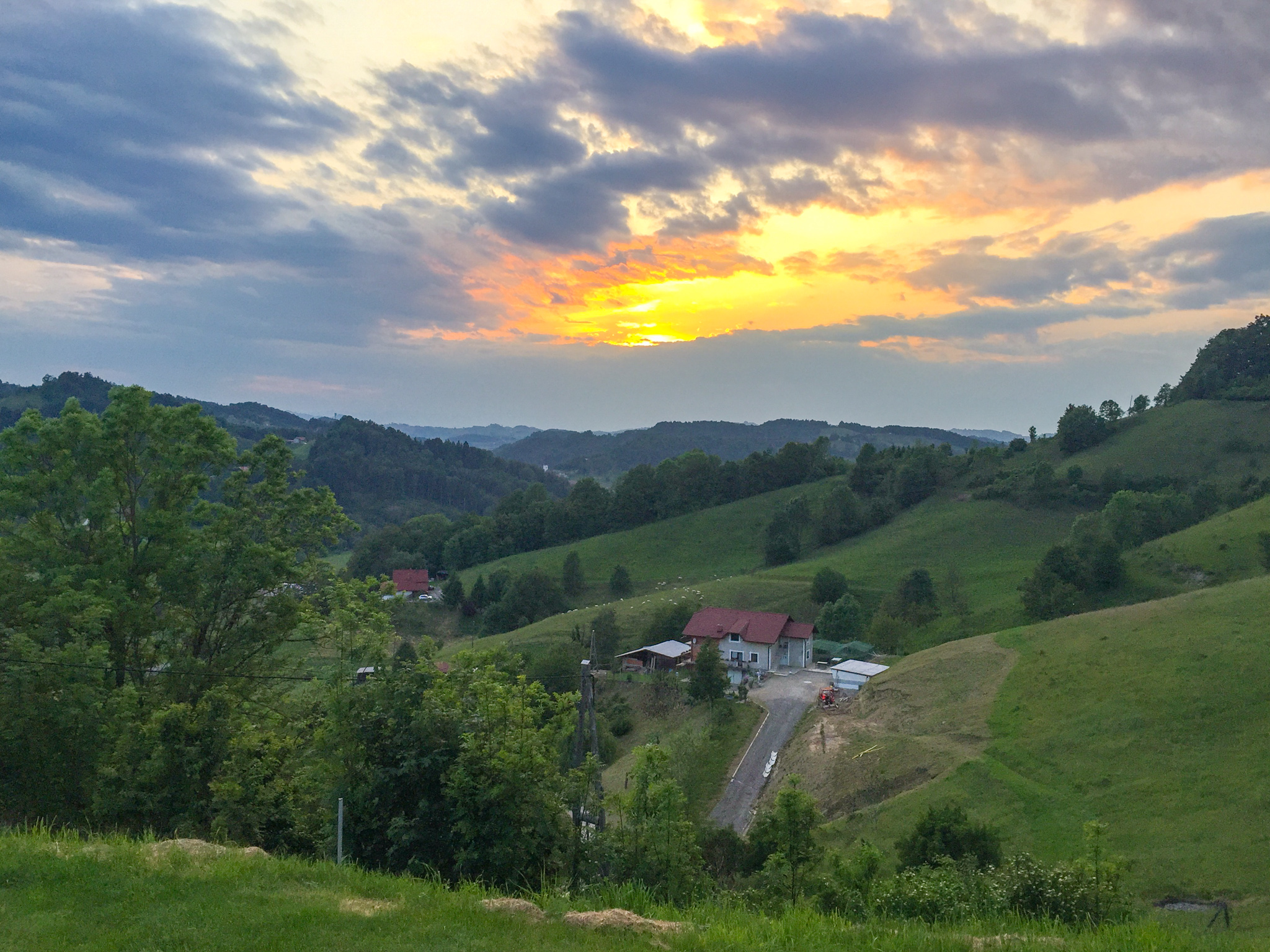
- Postcard of Zgornja Kungota

- Location in Slovenia
- Coordinates: 46°38′19.86″N 15°36′50.61″E
- Country: Slovenia
- Traditional region: Styria
- Statistical region: Drava
- Municipality: Kungota

Area
  - Total: 3.64 km^{2} (1.41 sq mi)
- Elevation: 272.8 m (895 ft)

Population (2002)
  - Total: 1,594

Zgornja Kungota (pronounced [ˈzɡoːɾnja ˈkuːŋɡɔta], formerly Zgornja Sveta Kungota, German: Ober Sankt Kunigund) is a village and the seat of the Municipality of Kungota in the western part of the Slovene Hills (Slovene: Slovenske gorice) in northeastern Slovenia.

The parish church in the village, from which the settlement gets its name, is dedicated to Saint Cunigunde and belongs to the Roman Catholic Archdiocese of Maribor. It is built close to the left bank of the Pesnica River southwest of the main settlement. It was first mentioned in written documents dating to 1391, but the current church dates to the 18th century, when the old core was extended and two chapels were added.
