= Pesnica (river) =

Pesnica Pößnitz
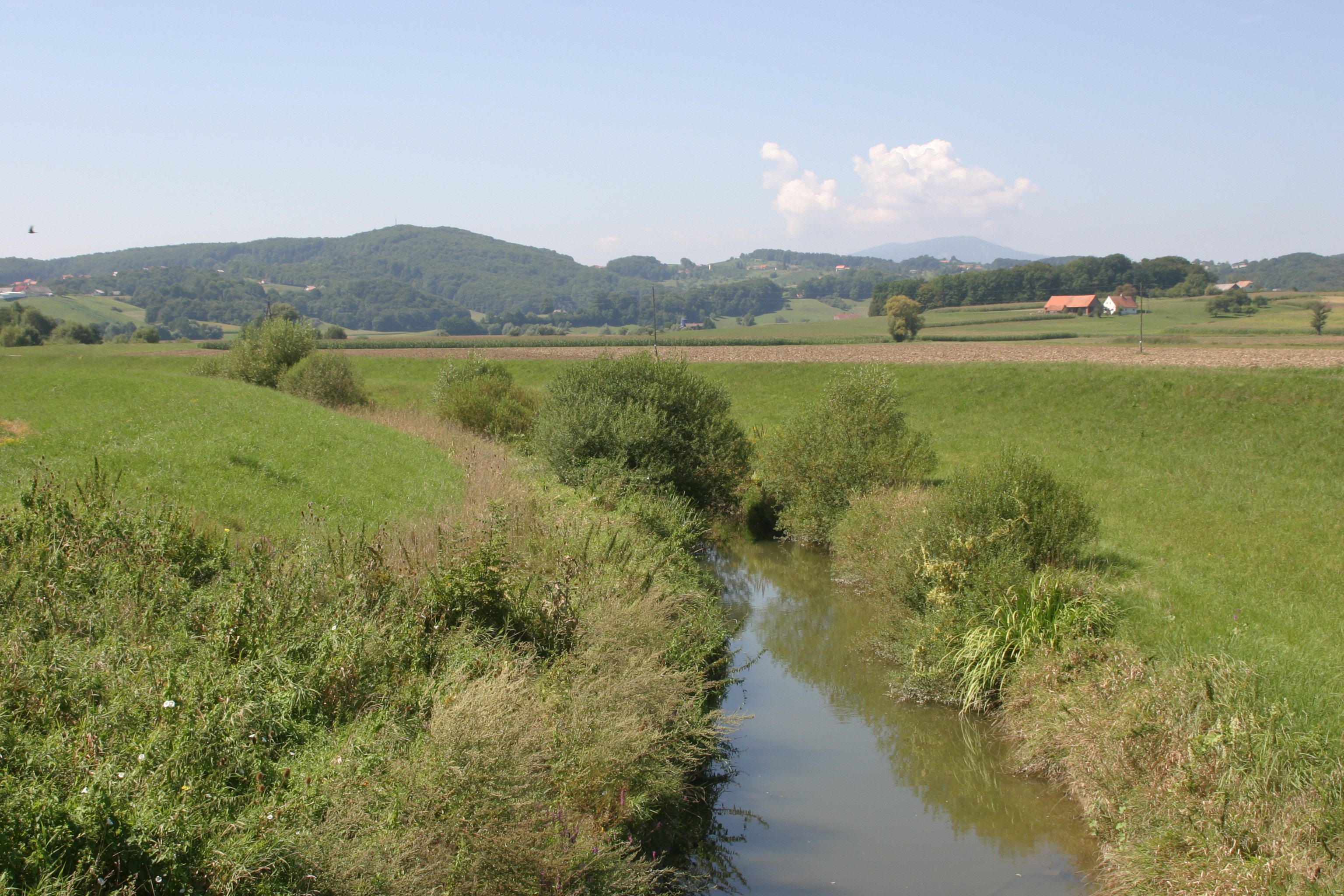
- Pesnica near Hrastovec v Slovenskih Goricah

Location
- Countries: Austria and Slovenia

Physical characteristics
- Mouth
  - location: Drava
  - coordinates: 46.4053°N 16.1371°E
- Length: 69 km (43 mi)
- Basin size: 550 km^{2} (210 sq mi)

Basin features
- Progression: Drava→ Danube→ Black Sea

The Pesnica (pronounced [ˈpéːsnitsa]; German: Pößnitz) is a river in Styria, southeastern Austria and in Styria, northeastern Slovenia.

It is 69 km (43 mi) long, of which 65 km (40 mi) is in Slovenia. Its catchment area is about 550 km^{2} (210 sq mi), of which 539 km^{2} (208 sq mi) is in Slovenia. Its source is near Glanz an der Weinstraße, near the Austrian-Slovenian border. It passes Zgornja Kungota, Pesnica, Pernica, the castle at Hrastovec v Slovenskih Goricah, Lenart v Slovenskih Goricah, the monastery of Sveta Trojica v Slovenskih Goricah, Dornava, and Velika Nedelja, and then merges with the Drava near Ormož, on the border with Croatia.
