= Slovene Hills =

Hilly region of Slovenia and the Austrian province of Styria

Coordinates: 46°35′N 15°55′E

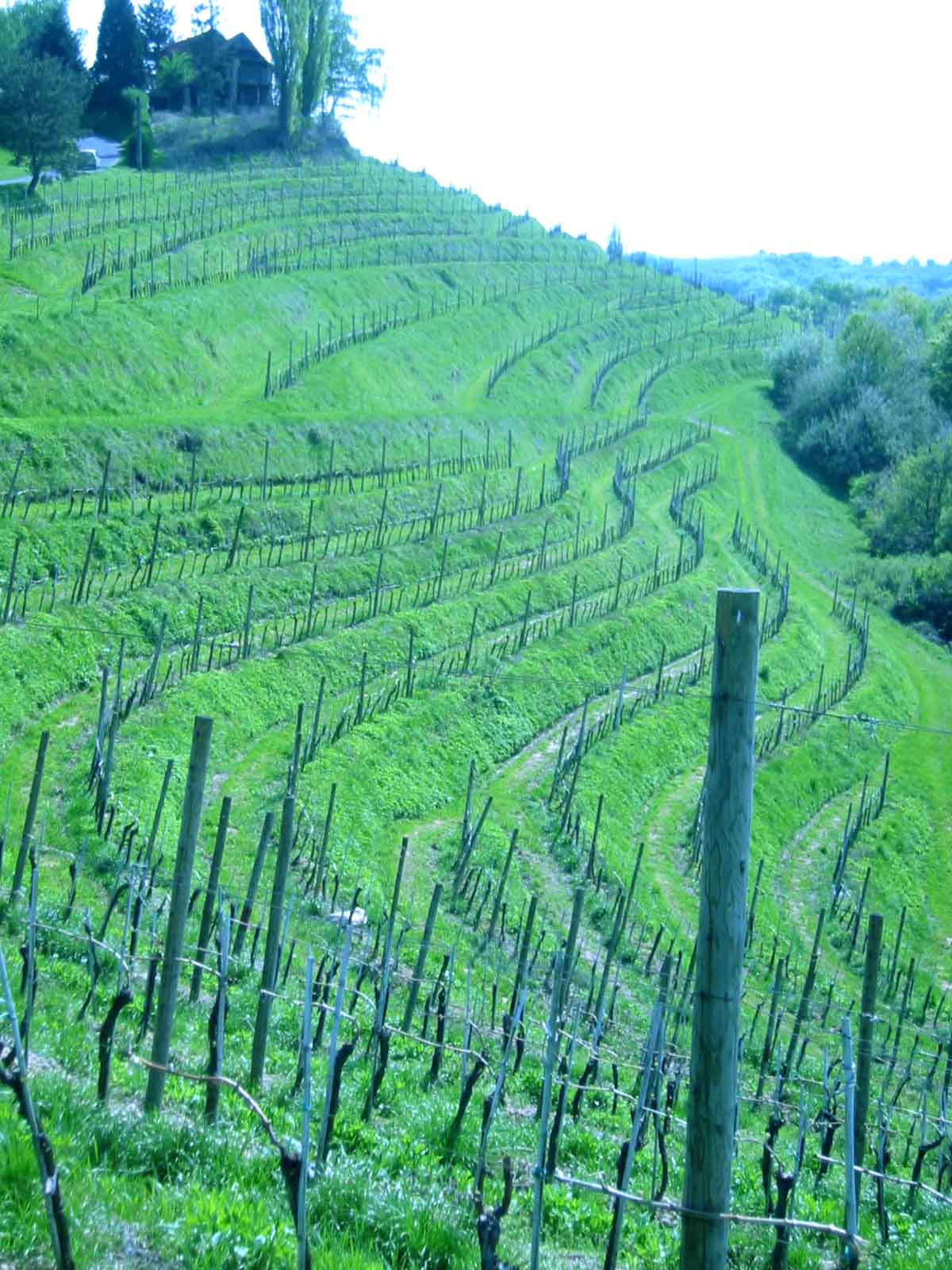
Vineyards in Jeruzalem

The Slovene Hills or the Slovenian Hills (Slovene: Slovenske gorice, German: Windische Bühel or Windische Büheln) is the largest hilly region of Slovenia, a smaller part is located in the Austrian province of Styria. It is situated in the northeast of the country and has an area of 1,017 square kilometres (393 sq mi). It comprises the Western Slovene Hills and the Eastern Slovene Hills (also named Prlekija). The region is known for its vineyards and wines. The central town and municipality is Lenart.

== Name ==
The Slovene name Slovenske gorice and German name Windische Bühel(n) both mean 'Slovene Hills'; the German adjective windisch 'Wendish' is a traditional name for Slavs in general and Slovenes in particular. The hills were attested in historical sources in 1123 as Colles (and as Puchelen in 1296 and Pücheln in 1407). It is hypothesized that the name Slovenske gorice originally applied to a smaller central area of the range, between Mureck and Lenart v Slovenskih Goricah.

== Overview ==
The Slovene Hills area consists of Cenozoic hills, for the most part lower than 400 metres (1,300 ft) in elevation, and one of the most individualized landscapes of Slovenia. There are a multitude of low ridges and hills traversed by numerous river valleys, which extend from the northwest towards southeast almost linearly. They border the Mura River to the east, the Drava River to the west, Croatia to the south, and the Gamlitz River in Austria to the north. The climate is a moderate continental climate with the amount of precipitation decreasing and average temperatures increasing from the west towards the east. There are also pronounced vertical differences due to the temperature inversion. The average annual precipitation ranges from 900 to 1,000 millimetres (35 to 39 in), with the largest part falling in the growth period.

In 1991, the Slovene Hills had 92,320 inhabitants, but this number is gradually falling. Larger serried settlements have formed only along Velka Creek, Globovnica Creek, and James Creek (Slovene: Jakobski potok). Elsewhere, farms are densely disposed in long strips along the hill ridges.

The region has been included in the European Natura 2000 network. It is the only nesting region for the European roller (Coracias garrulus) in Slovenia. The green woodpecker (Picus viridis), the hoopoe (Upupa epops), the common redstart (Phoenicurus phoenicurus), the turtle dove (Streptopelia turtur), the red-backed shrike (Lanius collurio), and the yellowhammer (Emberiza citrinella) nest there as well.
