= List of rivers of Slovenia =

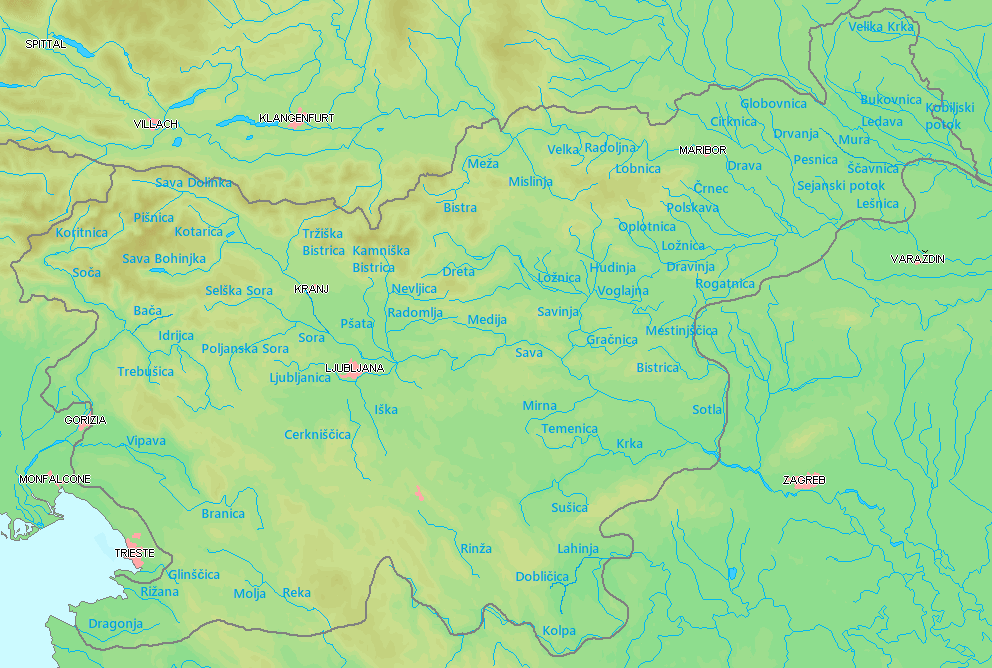
Map of river systems in Slovenia

This is a list of rivers of Slovenia. There are 59 major rivers in Slovenia, altogether measuring about 2,500 kilometres (1,600 mi) in length. The total length of all rivers in Slovenia is 26,989 kilometres (16,770 mi), which gives a river density of 1,33 km/km^{2}. The territory of Slovenia mainly (16,423 square kilometres or 6,341 square miles, i.e. 81%) belongs to the Black Sea basin, and a smaller part (3,851 square kilometres or 1,487 square miles, i.e. 19%) belongs to the Adriatic Sea basin. These two parts are divided into smaller units regarding their central rivers, the Mura River basin, the Drava River basin, the Sava River basin with Kolpa River basin, and the basin of the Adriatic rivers.

== By drainage basin ==
This list is arranged by drainage basin, with respective tributaries, arranged in the order of their confluence from mouth to source, indented under each larger stream's name.

=== Draining into the Mediterranean Sea ===
- Soča River
  - Nadiža River
    - Jamjak Creek
    - Lerada Creek
    - White Creek (Bela)
  - Vipava River
    - Vrtojbica Creek
    - Lijak Creek
    - Branica Creek
      - Mlac Creek
      - Raša Creek
    - Košivec Creek
    - Skrivšek Creek
    - Jovšček Creek
    - Hubelj River (sl)
    - White Creek (Bela)
  - Idrijca River
    - Bača River
      - Knežica Creek
        - Prošček Creek
      - Bad Creek (Huda grapa)
        - Runža Creek
    - Trebuščica River
      - Hotenja Creek
    - Daberšček Creek
    - Poličanka Creek
    - Beech Creek (Bukovska grapa)
    - Cerknica River
      - Cerenščica Creek
    - Zaganjalčnica Creek
    - Otuška Creek
    - Luknjica Creek
    - Ugly Creek (Grda grapa)
    - Kanomljica Creek
    - Ljubevščica Creek
  - Gadiča Creek
  - Tolminka River
    - Zadlaščica Creek
  - Hotevlje Creek
  - Volarja Creek
  - White Creek (Beli potok)
  - Kokošnjak Creek
  - Ročica Creek
    - Korito Creek
  - Idrija Creek
  - Castle Creek (Trnovo ob Soči) (Potok za gradom)
  - Kozjak Creek
  - Globoščak Creek
  - Učja River
  - Boka Creek
  - Koritnica River
    - Prešnik Creek (Prešnikov graben)
    - Predelica Creek
    - Kaludrica Creek
    - Ilovec Creek
  - Lepenjica Creek
  - Vrsnik Creek
  - Laventnik Creek
- Reka River
- Rižana River (sl)
- Dragonja River

=== Draining into the Black Sea ===
- Sava River
  - Kolpa River
    - Lahinja River
      - Krupa River
      - Dobličica Creek
    - Čabranka River
  - Sotla River
  - Krka River
    - Radulja River
    - Temenica River
  - Mirna River
  - Savinja River
    - Voglajna River
      - Hudinja River
    - Ložnica River
    - Bolska River
    - Paka River
    - Dreta River
    - Rečica Creek
    - Gračnica Creek (sl)
    - Ljubnica Creek
    - Dupljenik Creek
    - White Creek (Bela)
    - Klobača Creek
    - Jurčef Creek
    - Suhelj Creek
    - Lašek Creek
    - Sour Creek (Kisla voda)
    - Black Creek (Črna)
    - Jezera Creek
  - Koritnik Creek (Koritnikov graben)
  - Boben Creek (sl)
    - Brnica Creek
  - Ribnik Creek (sl)
  - Trboveljščica Creek (sl)
    - Bevščica Creek (sl)
  - Šklendrovec Creek (sl)
  - Medija Creek (sl)
  - Šumnik Creek (sl)
  - Pasjek Creek (sl)
  - Mošenik Creek (sl)
  - Log Creek (Loški potok)
  - Sava Creek (Savski potok)
  - Konj Creek (Konjski potok)
  - Maljek Creek (sl)
  - Reka Creek (sl)
    - Jablanica Creek (Jablaniški potok)
    - Black Creek (Crni potok)
    - Rakovnik Creek
  - Beden Creek (Bedenov graben)
    - Horse Creek (Konjski potok)
    - Deer Creek (Jelenji potok)
  - Berečan Creek (Berečanov graben)
  - Drnik Creek (sl)
  - Prihudnik Creek (sl)
  - Potok Creek (Potoški graben)
  - Loki Creek (Loki potok)
  - Presenec Creek (Presenčev potok)
  - Dešen Creek (Dešenski graben)
  - Janček Creek (Jančkov graben)
  - Lovše Creek (Lovšetov potok)
  - Cvar Creek (Cvarjev potok)
  - Zalog Creek (Zaloški potok)
  - Krmelj Creek (Krmeljev graben)
  - Jevnica Creek (sl)
  - Slapnica Creek (sl)
  - Grabnar Creek (Grabnarjev graben)
  - Ježe Creek (Ježetov graben)
  - Mlinščica River (sl)
  - Lučna Creek (sl)
  - Gostinca Creek
    - Gobnik Creek
    - Lutnik Creek (sl)
    - Ovčjak Creek (sl)
    - Long Creek (Dolgi potok)
  - Ljubljanica River
    - Besnica Creek
      - Aslivka Creek
    - Šivnik River
    - Gobovšček River
    - Hrušica Creek (Hruševski potok)
    - Mejaš River
    - Gradaščica River
      - Glinščica Creek
        - Pržanec Creek
      - Šujica Creek
      - Horjulščica River
      - Hruševnik Creek
      - Belca Creek
        - Šujica Creek
      - Prosca Creek
      - Little Creek (Mala voda)
      - Božna River
        - Big Božna Creek (Velika Božna)
        - Little Božna Creek (Mala Božna)
    - Ižica Creek
    - Iška Creek
    - Borovniščica Creek
    - Bistra Creek
  - Kamnik Bistrica River
    - Studenčica Creek
    - Pšata River
      - Gobovček Creek
      - Tunjščica Creek
      - Reka Creek
    - Mlinčica Creek
    - Rača River
      - Rovščica Creek
      - Radomlja Creek
    - Pšata Canal (Kanal Pšata)
    - Krajčjek Creek
    - Nevljica River
      - Oševek Creek
      - Porebrščica Creek
    - Stranje Creek (Stranjski potok)
    - Black Creek (Črna)
    - Bistričica Creek
    - Horse Creek (Konjski potok)
    - Korošica Creek
  - Sora River
    - Poljanščica River
      - Sovpat Creek
      - Brebovščica Creek
        - Dršak Creek
    - Selščica River
      - Jablenovica Creek
      - Drbovnik Creek
      - Selnica Creek
      - Studeno Creek (Studenska grapa)
      - Lower Smoleva Creek (Prednja Smoleva)
      - Plenšak Creek
      - Upper Smoleva Creek (Zadnja Smoleva)
      - Davča Creek
      - Pruhavca Creek
      - Pometpoh Creek
      - Black Creek (Črni potok)
      - Štajnpoh Creek
      - Upper Sora Creek (Zadnja Sora)
  - Kokra River
  - Tržič Bistrica River
  - Sava Bohinjka River
  - Sava Dolinka River
- Drava River
  - Pesnica River
  - Dravinja River
    - Oplotniščica River
    - Polskava River
      - Fram Creek (Framski potok)
  - Meža River
    - Mislinja River
      - Selčnica Creek
      - Globoščica Creek
      - Lakužnica Creek
- Mura River
  - Ledava River
    - Kerka River (Krka)
      - Big Krka River (Velika Krka)
      - Little Krka River (Mala Krka)
    - Ajaš Creek
    - Črnec Creek
    - Kobilje Creek
  - Ščavnica River

== Alphabetically ==
Name	Length in Slovenia (km)	Total length (km)
Bača	20	20
Bolska	32	32
Čabranka	17.5	
Davščica	12	12
Dragonja	30	30
Drava	142	707
Dravinja	73	73
Dreta	29	29
Fram Creek	26	26
Gradaščica	33	33
Hudinja	32	32
Idrijca	60	60
Iška	31	31
Jezernica	0.055	0.055
Kamnik Bistrica	33	33
Kerka		60
Kobilje Creek	24	33
Kokra	34	34
Kolpa	118	297
Krka	94	94
Krupa	2.5	2.5
Lahinja	34	34
Ledava	68	76
Ljubljanica	41	41
Ložnica	26	26
Meža	42	43
Mirna	44	44
Mislinja	36	36
Mura	95	438
Nadiža		60
Nevljica		
Oplotnica	28	28
Paka	40	40
Pesnica	65	69
Pivka	27	27
Poljane Sora	43	43
Polskava	40	40
Pšata	28	28
Radulja	33	33
Reka	51	54
Rinža	9.3	
Sava	221	947
Sava Bohinjka	41	41
Sava Dolinka	55	55
Savinja	102	102
Ščavnica	56	56
Selca Sora	32	32
Soča	96	138
Sora	52	52
Sotla	86	90
Temenica	27	27
Tržič Bistrica	27	27
Vipava	44	49
Voglajna	35	35

== See also ==
- List of rivers
