= A4 motorway (Slovenia) =

Highway in Slovenia

A4 Motorway
- Avtocesta A4

Route information
- Part of E59

Major junctions
- From: Slivnica (Maribor), Slovenia
- To: A2, Croatia at Gruškovje border crossing

Location
- Country: Slovenia
- Regions: Lower Styria
- Major cities: Maribor, Ptuj

Highway system
- Highways in Slovenia

The A4 motorway (Slovene: avtocesta A4, Podravski krak) is a 33.4 km long motorway in Slovenia connecting Maribor and Gruškovje (at the Croatian border). It also connects the two principal cities of the Drava Statistical Region of Slovenia, Maribor and Ptuj. Construction began in 2007 and was completed in 2018.

== Sections ==
The A4 consists of three sections:

- Slivnica (Maribor) – Draženci (Ptuj): opened on 16 July 2009.
- Section Draženci – Gruškovje develops along the existing highway. A reconstruction of parallel local roads is also planned now. Of this section shall be in 2011-2012 produced a project for a building permit and bought land in accordance with the adopted national spatial plan.
  - Section Draženci – Podlehnik opened on 22 November 2017.
  - Construction on section Podlehnik – Gruškovje started in 2016 and finished in November 2018.
- An international border check point Gruškovje was built in the spring of 2003 on the future route of the highway. This was a condition for the entry of Slovenia into the Schengen Area in December 2007. Then in December 2009 a 0.56 km section of the highway was opened from the check point to the actual border with the Republic of Croatia, where it attaches to the Croatian motorway network in Macelj. The border crossing area is adjacent to the border control, built a 2 overpass with deviation of the future regional road.

== Junctions, exits and rest area ==
A1 (Slivnica) – Gruškovje (33.4 km)
Interchange	x km	Slivnica interchange	A1 motorway (Slovenia)	A1 turns toward -> (Austria) or Ljubljana
(1)	x km	Airport		Maribor Edvard Rusjan Airport
(2)	x km	Marjeta na Dravskem Polju		
Prepolje toll plaza
(3)	x km	Zlatoličje		
Petrol station Rest area	x km	Počivališče Dravsko Polje		OMV / OMV
(4)	x km	Hajdina	454	
(5)	x km	Draženci interchange		
(6)	x km	Lancova Vas	690	Opened in November 2017
(7)	x km	Podlehnik		Opened in November 2017
(8)	x km	Zakl	689	Opened in November 2018
Border crossing within the EU	x km	Gruškovje – Macelj border crossing		
Autocesta A2 → to Zagreb, Croatia
