= Kobilje (disambiguation) =

Kobilje is a village and a municipality in the Prekmurje region of Slovenia.

Kobilje may also refer to:

In Slovenia:

- Kobilje Creek, left tributary of the Ledava River in northeastern Slovenia and western Hungary

In Serbia:

- Kobilje, Kruševac, a village
- Kobilje, Malo Crniće, a village
- Kobilje (Brus), a village

== See also ==
- Kobjeglava, a village in the Littoral region of Slovenia
- Kobilja (disambiguation)
