= Sela, Videm =

Sela
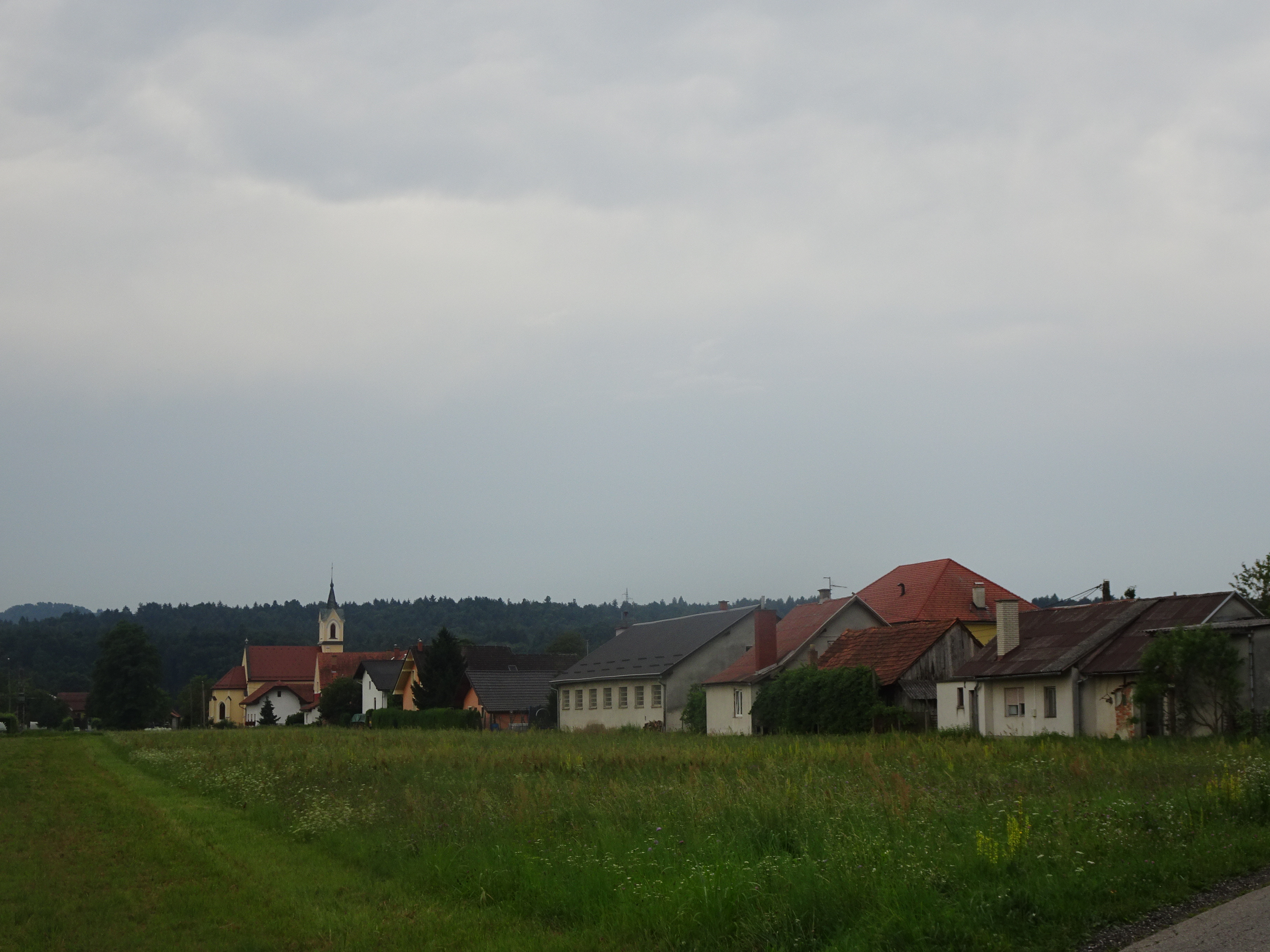

- Location in Slovenia
- Coordinates: 46°22′14.06″N 15°49′34.14″E
- Country: Slovenia
- Traditional region: Styria
- Statistical region: Drava
- Municipality: Videm

Area
  - Total: 3.04 km^{2} (1.17 sq mi)
- Elevation: 230.5 m (756 ft)

Population (2002)
  - Total: 188

Sela (pronounced [ˈseːla]) is a settlement on the left bank of the Polskava River south of Ptuj in eastern Slovenia. It belongs to the Municipality of Videm and forms a more or less continuous settlement together with Barislovci. The area is part of the traditional region of Styria. It is now included in the Drava Statistical Region.

The local church, built 1904 and dedicated to the Holy Family, although technically in Barislovci, is known locally as the church at Sela. There is also a small chapel-shrine with a belfry at the village crossroads. It was built in 1920.
