= Popovci =

Popovci may refer to:

- Popovci, Slovenia, a village near Videm, Slovenia
- Popovci (Aleksandrovac), a village near Aleksandrovac, Serbia
- Popovci, Croatia, a village near Pakrac, Croatia
