= Rošnja =

- Location in Slovenia
- Coordinates: 46°28′35.91″N 15°44′56.28″E
- Country: Slovenia
- Traditional region: Styria
- Statistical region: Drava
- Municipality: Starše

Area
  - Total: 2.56 km^{2} (0.99 sq mi)
- Elevation: 240 m (790 ft)

Population (2002)
  - Total: 399

Rošnja (pronounced [ˈɾɔːʃnja] or [ˈɾoːʃnja]) is a village in the Municipality of Starše in northeastern Slovenia. It lies on the right bank of the Drava River on the local road from Starše towards Miklavž na Dravskem Polju. The area is part of the traditional region of Styria. The entire municipality is now included in the Drava Statistical Region.
