= Kobilja =

Kobilja may refer to:

In Bosnia and Herzegovina:

- Kobilja (river), right tributary of Ugar
- Kobilja, a settlement in Kneževo (formerly Skender Vakuf)
- Kobilja Glava, a village near Vogošća Municipality, near Sarajevo

== See also ==
- Kobjeglava, a village in the Littoral region of Slovenia
- Kobilje (disambiguation)
