= Worse Creek =

Stream in Georgia, United States

Coordinates: 34°44′15″N 83°21′25″W

Worse Creek is a stream in the U.S. state of Georgia. It is a tributary to the Chattooga River.

Worse Creek was so named on account rough terrain near its course, cf. nearby Bad Creek.
