= Zgornja Pristava, Videm =

Zgornja Pristava
- Location in Slovenia
- Coordinates: 46°21′5.58″N 15°49′52.75″E
- Country: Slovenia
- Traditional region: Styria
- Statistical region: Drava
- Municipality: Videm

Area
  - Total: 5.15 km^{2} (1.99 sq mi)
- Elevation: 224.1 m (735 ft)

Population (2002)
  - Total: 216

Zgornja Pristava (pronounced [ˈzɡoːɾnja ˈpɾiːstaʋa]) is a settlement on the left bank of the Dravinja River in the Municipality of Videm in eastern Slovenia. Its territory extends northwards towards Barislovci up to the left bank of the Polskava River. The area is part of the traditional region of Styria. It is now included in the Drava Statistical Region.
