= Tržec =

- Location in Slovenia
- Coordinates: 46°21′47.17″N 15°52′28.71″E
- Country: Slovenia
- Traditional region: Styria
- Statistical region: Drava
- Municipality: Videm

Area
  - Total: 1.83 km^{2} (0.71 sq mi)
- Elevation: 221.8 m (728 ft)

Population (2002)
  - Total: 323

Tržec (pronounced [ˈtəɾʒəts]) is a settlement at the confluence of the Polskava River with the Dravinja in the Municipality of Videm in eastern Slovenia. The area is part of the traditional region of Styria. It is now included in the Drava Statistical Region.

There is a small rectangular chapel-shrine with a polygonal apse in the settlement. It was built in 1922.
