= Zgornja Pristava =

Zgornja Pristava may refer to:

- Zgornja Pristava, Slovenske Konjice, a settlement in the Municipality of Slovenske Konjice in eastern Slovenia
- Zgornja Pristava, Videm, a settlement on the left bank of the Dravinja River in the Municipality of Videm in eastern Slovenia
