= Dobrovce =

- Location in Slovenia
- Coordinates: 46°28′50.9″N 15°42′9.57″E
- Country: Slovenia
- Traditional region: Styria
- Statistical region: Drava
- Municipality: Miklavž na Dravskem Polju

Area
  - Total: 3.98 km^{2} (1.54 sq mi)
- Elevation: 257.9 m (846 ft)

Population (2002)
  - Total: 722

Dobrovce (pronounced [ˈdoːbɾɔu̯tsɛ]) is a village in the Municipality of Miklavž na Dravskem Polju in northeastern Slovenia. It lies on the right bank of the Drava River southeast of Maribor. The area is part of the traditional region of Styria. The municipality is now included in the Drava Statistical Region.

The local church is dedicated to the Assumption of Mary and belongs to the Parish of Slivnica pri Mariboru. It was built in 1934.
