= Lancova Vas =

- Location in Slovenia
- Coordinates: 46°22′14.56″N 15°51′22.7″E
- Country: Slovenia
- Traditional region: Styria
- Statistical region: Drava
- Municipality: Videm

Area
  - Total: 4.2 km^{2} (1.6 sq mi)
- Elevation: 226.5 m (743 ft)

Population (2014)
  - Total: 535

Lancova Vas (pronounced [ˈlaːntsɔʋa ˈʋaːs]; Slovene: Lancova vas) is a settlement on the left bank of the Polskava River in the Municipality of Videm in eastern Slovenia. The area is part of the traditional region of Styria. It is now included in the Drava Statistical Region.

== History ==
In 1989, part of the territory of Lancova Vas was separated to become a new settlement called Lancova Vas pri Ptuju.

== Cultural heritage ==
In 2006, during construction work for a new section of a motorway, a rescue archaeological survey and partial excavations were conducted and remains of a Roman era settlement were discovered.
