= Popovci, Videm =

Popovci
- Location in Slovenia
- Coordinates: 46°21′15.96″N 15°50′34.54″E
- Country: Slovenia
- Traditional region: Styria
- Statistical region: Drava
- Municipality: Videm

Area
  - Total: 2.13 km^{2} (0.82 sq mi)
- Elevation: 230.5 m (756 ft)

Population (2002)
  - Total: 112

Popovci (pronounced [ˈpoːpɔu̯tsi]) is a settlement south of Ptuj in the Municipality of Videm in eastern Slovenia. It extends from the left bank of the Dravinja River to the right bank of the Polskava. The area is part of the traditional region of Styria. It is now included in the Drava Statistical Region.
