= Dobličica =

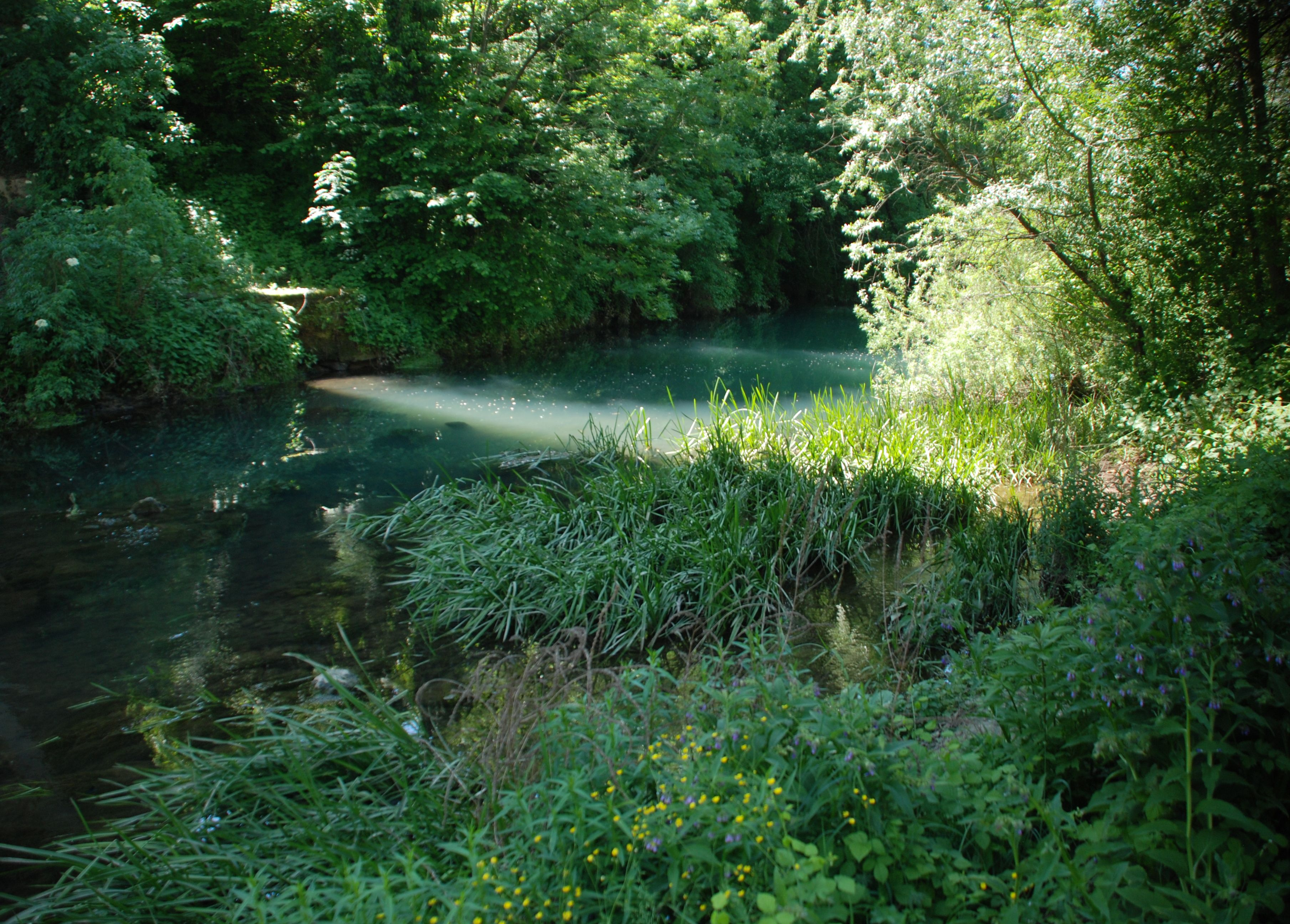
- The Dobličica in Črnomelj

Location
- Country: Slovenia

Physical characteristics
- Mouth
  - location: Lahinja
  - coordinates: 45°34′7″N 15°11′33″E

Basin features
- Progression: Lahinja→ Kupa→ Sava→ Danube→ Black Sea

The Dobličica is a stream in White Carniola. It is part of a karst aquifer. Due to its geological and hydrological characteristics and urbanization of the area, it is considered sensitive and subject to pollution.

== Geography ==
The Dobličica has its source in the eastern foothills of the Poljane Mountains (Slovene: Poljanska gora) at Lake Dobliče (Slovene: Dobličko jezero), which is 40 meters (130 ft) across and up to 10 meters (33 ft) deep. The bed of the lake is covered with large boulders, among which karst water flows from two depressions. A karst spring with a constant flow feeds the lake, with an outflow in a broad but shallow channel. The upper part of the stream bed is rocky mixed with sand, and the banks are loamy. Soon after the source, another spring adds its water to the flow from the lake. The channel is bordered by typical riverside vegetation and meanders through meadows before being joined by another stream, the Potok, and emptying into the Lahinja River at Črnomelj. The Dobličica and the Lahinja surround the old town center of Črnomelj on three sides.

A catchwater for the White Carniola water system was created near the lake in 1958.

== Black olm ==
In 1986, members of the Slovenian Karst Research Institute discovered black olms (Proteus anginius parkelj) during experimental pumping at the lake.

== Sources ==
- Inventar najpomembnejše naravne dediščine Slovenije (Lahinja), Ljubljana, 1991

== See also ==
- List of rivers of Slovenia
