= Majski Vrh =

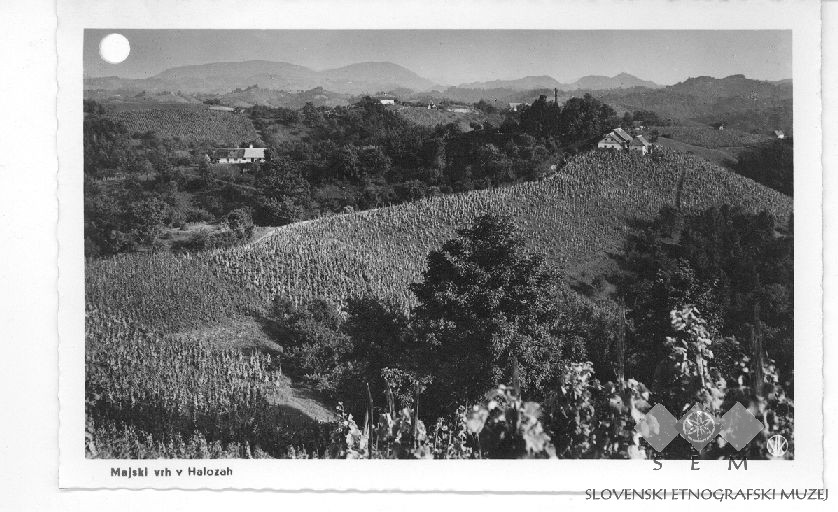
- Postcard of Majski Vrh

- Location in Slovenia
- Coordinates: 46°21′18.57″N 15°53′23.45″E
- Country: Slovenia
- Traditional region: Styria
- Statistical region: Drava
- Municipality: Videm

Area
  - Total: 2.21 km^{2} (0.85 sq mi)
- Elevation: 335.7 m (1,101 ft)

Population (2002)
  - Total: 100

Majski Vrh (pronounced [ˈmaːi̯ski ˈʋəːɾx]) is a settlement in the Haloze Hills above the right bank of the Dravinja River in the Municipality of Videm in eastern Slovenia. The area is part of the traditional region of Styria. It is now included in the Drava Statistical Region.
