= Prepolje =

- Location in Slovenia
- Coordinates: 46°26′47.67″N 15°45′53.36″E
- Country: Slovenia
- Traditional region: Styria
- Statistical region: Drava
- Municipality: Starše

Area
  - Total: 5.12 km^{2} (1.98 sq mi)
- Elevation: 12.03 m (39.5 ft)

Population (2002)
  - Total: 543

Prepolje (pronounced [ˈpɾeːpɔljɛ], in older sources also Prepola) is a village in the Municipality of Starše in northeastern Slovenia. The area is part of the traditional region of Styria. It is now included in the Drava Statistical Region.

The local church is dedicated to Saint Ursula and belongs to the Parish of Šent Janž na Dravskem Polju. It dates to the early 17th century.
