= Strmec pri Leskovcu =

- Location in Slovenia
- Coordinates: 46°20′5.89″N 15°55′0.94″E
- Country: Slovenia
- Traditional region: Styria
- Statistical region: Drava
- Municipality: Videm

Area
  - Total: 3.01 km^{2} (1.16 sq mi)
- Elevation: 310.1 m (1,017 ft)

Population (2002)
  - Total: 69

Strmec pri Leskovcu (pronounced [ˈstəɾməts pɾi ˈleːskɔʋtsu]) is a settlement in the Haloze Hills in eastern Slovenia. It is part of the Municipality of Videm. The area is part of the traditional region of Styria. It is now included in the Drava Statistical Region.

== Name ==
The name of the settlement was changed from Strmec to Strmec pri Leskovcu in 1953.
