= Marjeta na Dravskem Polju =

Marjeta na Dravskem Polju Sveta Marjeta na Dravskem polju (until 1955)
- Location in Slovenia
- Coordinates: 46°27′13.67″N 15°44′1.73″E
- Country: Slovenia
- Traditional region: Styria
- Statistical region: Drava
- Municipality: Starše

Area
  - Total: 5.39 km^{2} (2.08 sq mi)
- Elevation: 247.3 m (811 ft)

Population (2002)
  - Total: 476

Marjeta na Dravskem Polju (pronounced [maˈɾjéːta na ˈdɾàːwskɛm ˈpóːlju]; German: Sankt Margarethen am Draufelde) is a village in the Municipality of Starše in northeastern Slovenia. It lies on the right bank of the Drava River southeast of Maribor. The area is part of the traditional region of Styria. It is now included in the Drava Statistical Region.

== Name ==
The name of the settlement was changed from Sveta Marjeta na Dravskem polju (literally, 'Saint Margaret on the Drava Plain', in older sources also Sveta Marjeta na Dravskem Polji) to Marjeta na Dravskem polju (literally, 'Margaret on the Drava Plain') in 1955. The name was changed on the basis of the 1948 Law on Names of Settlements and Designations of Squares, Streets, and Buildings as part of efforts by Slovenia's postwar communist government to remove religious elements from toponyms.

== Church ==
The local church from which the settlement gets its name is dedicated to Saint Margaret (Slovene: sveta Marjeta) and belongs to the Parish of Šent Janž na Dravskem Polju. It was built in 1685.
