= Zgornji Leskovec =

- Village
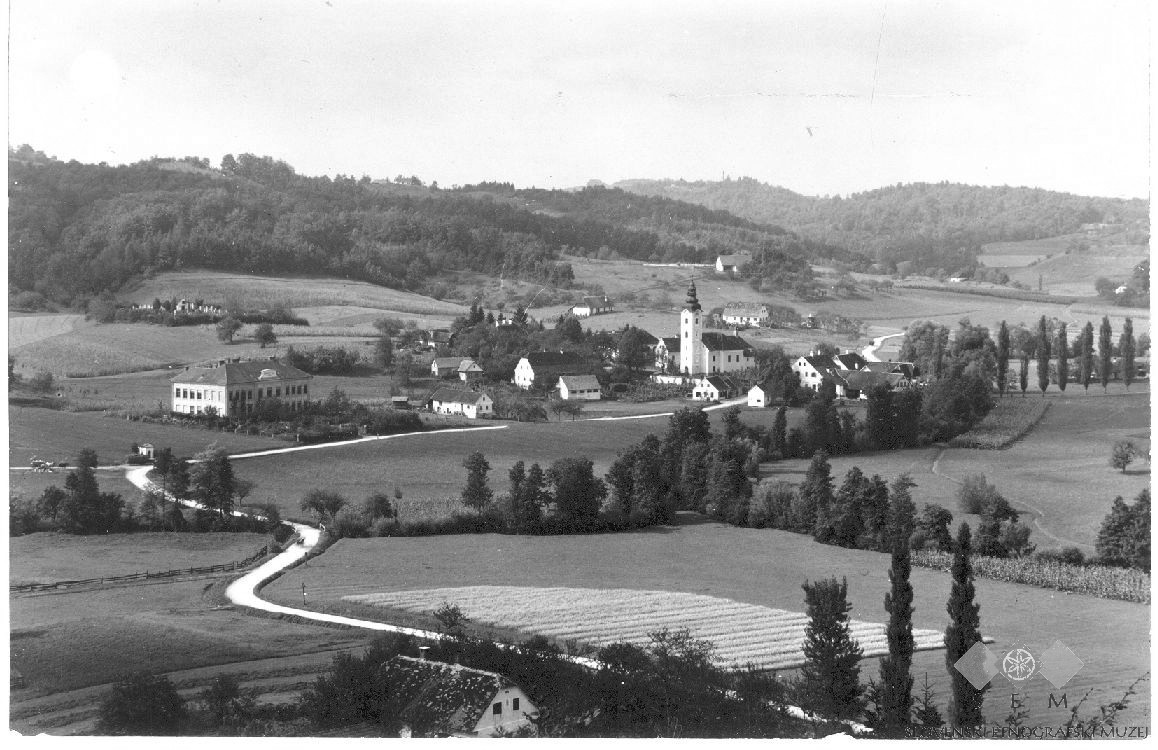
- Postcard of Zgornji Leskovec

- Location in Slovenia
- Coordinates: 46°19′45.58″N 15°56′9.33″E
- Country: Slovenia
- Traditional region: Styria
- Statistical region: Drava
- Municipality: Videm

Area
  - Total: 1.06 km^{2} (0.41 sq mi)
- Elevation: 227.8 m (747 ft)

Population (2002)
  - Total: 147

Zgornji Leskovec (pronounced [ˈzɡoːɾnji ˈleːskɔʋəts]) is a settlement in the upper valley of Lipnica Creek, a minor tributary of the Drava River, in the Municipality of Videm in eastern Slovenia. The area is part of the traditional region of Styria. It is now included in the Drava Statistical Region.

The parish church in the village is dedicated to Saint Andrew and belongs to the Roman Catholic Archdiocese of Maribor. The parish is known as Sveti Andraž v Halozah. The church was built in 1545.
