= Kobilje =

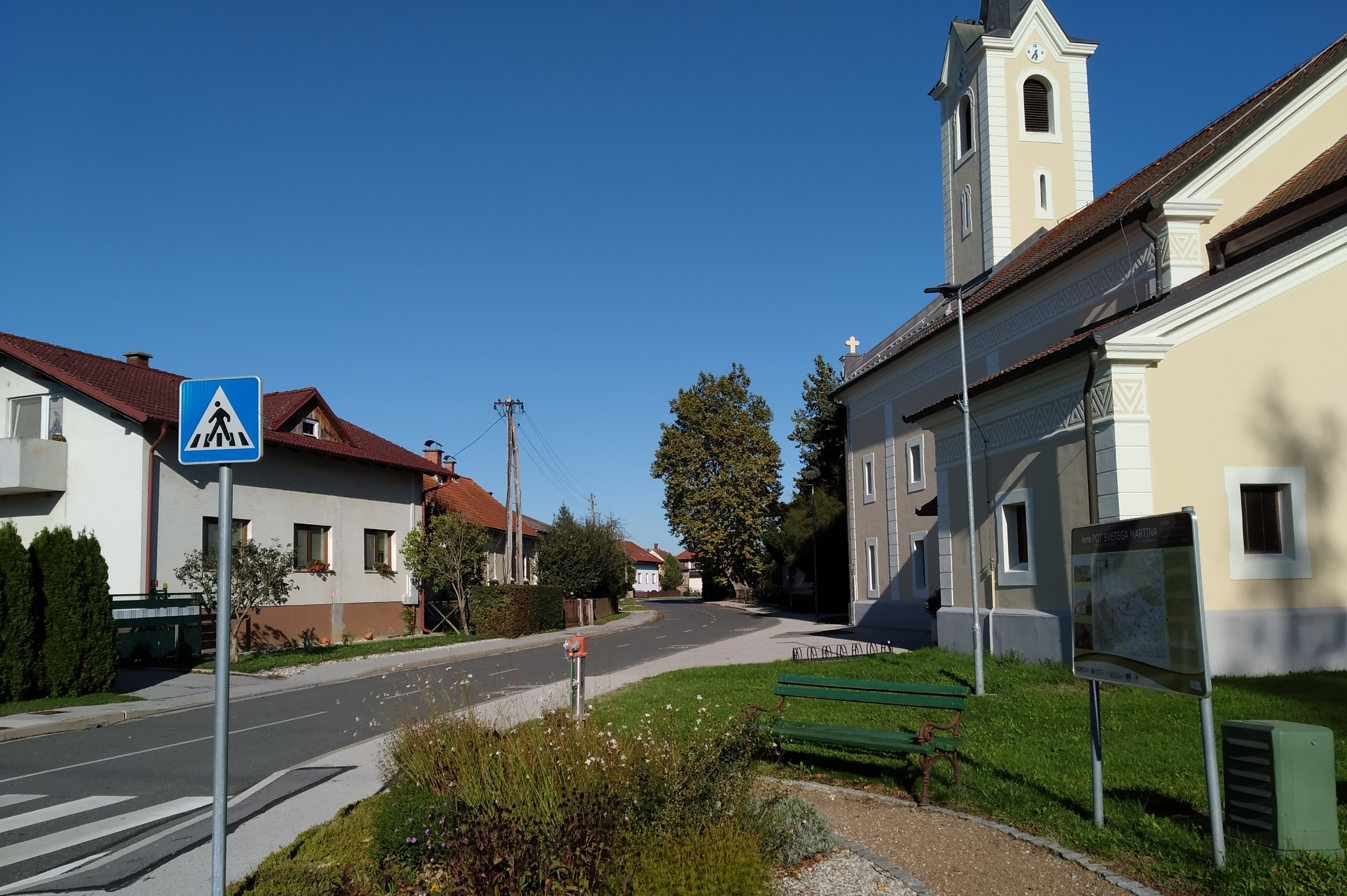

- Flag Coat of arms

- Location in Slovenia
- Coordinates: 46°41′1.35″N 16°23′42.99″E
- Country: Slovenia
- Traditional region: Prekmurje
- Statistical region: Mura
- Municipality: Kobilje

Area
  - Total: 19.74 km^{2} (7.62 sq mi)
- Elevation: 185.7 m (609 ft)

Population (2019)
  - Total: 542

Kobilje (pronounced [ˈkoːbiljɛ]; Hungarian: Kebeleszentmárton) is a village in the Prekmurje region of Slovenia, on the border with Hungary. Kobilje is both the seat of the Municipality of Kobilje and the only settlement in the municipality. Kobilje Creek, a left tributary of the Ledava River, flows through it.

== Name ==
The name Kobilje is believed to be derived from *Kobilje selo (literally, 'Kobilja village'), referring to Kobilje Creek (originally called *Kobilja (voda) based on medieval sources). In turn, Kobilje Creek was later renamed Kobiljanski potok after the settlement. The root of the name is derived from Slavic *kobyla 'mare'.

== Church ==
The parish church in the settlement is dedicated to Saint Martin, Saint Anthony of Padua, and Saint Roch. It belongs to the Roman Catholic Diocese of Murska Sobota.

== Notable people ==
Notable people that were born or lived in Kobilje include:

- Pavel Berden (1915–1981), missionary, poet, and painter
