= Soviče =

- Location in Slovenia
- Coordinates: 46°20′58.92″N 15°56′31.16″E
- Country: Slovenia
- Traditional region: Styria
- Statistical region: Drava
- Municipality: Videm

Area
  - Total: 1.5 km^{2} (0.58 sq mi)
- Elevation: 240.4 m (789 ft)

Population (2002)
  - Total: 116

Soviče (pronounced [ˈsɔːʋitʃe] or [ˈsoːʋitʃe]) is a settlement in the Haloze Hills above the right bank of the Drava River in eastern Slovenia. It belongs to the Municipality of Videm. The area is part of the traditional region of Styria. It is now included in the Drava Statistical Region.
