= Šturmovci =

- Location in Slovenia
- Coordinates: 46°22′53.12″N 15°54′8.52″E
- Country: Slovenia
- Traditional region: Styria
- Statistical region: Drava
- Municipality: Videm

Area
  - Total: 4.19 km^{2} (1.62 sq mi)
- Elevation: 214.8 m (705 ft)

Population (2002)
  - Total: 127

Šturmovci (pronounced [ˈʃtuːɾmɔu̯tsi]) is a settlement in the Municipality of Videm in eastern Slovenia. It lies south of Lake Ptuj. The area is part of the traditional region of Styria. It is now included in the Drava Statistical Region.
