= Brunšvik =

- Location in Slovenia
- Coordinates: 46°26′21.39″N 15°43′31.97″E
- Country: Slovenia
- Traditional region: Styria
- Statistical region: Drava
- Municipality: Starše
- Elevation: 249.7 m (819 ft)

Population (2002)
  - Total: 394

Brunšvik (pronounced [ˈbɾuːnʃʋik]) is a settlement in the Municipality of Starše in the Styria region of Slovenia.
