= Dravinjski Vrh =

- Location in Slovenia
- Coordinates: 46°21′43.78″N 15°54′11.11″E
- Country: Slovenia
- Traditional region: Styria
- Statistical region: Drava
- Municipality: Videm

Area
  - Total: 2.65 km^{2} (1.02 sq mi)
- Elevation: 305.4 m (1,002 ft)

Population (2002)
  - Total: 272

Dravinjski Vrh (pronounced [dɾaˈʋiːnski ˈʋəɾx]) is a settlement on the right bank of the Dravinja River in the Municipality of Videm in eastern Slovenia. The area is part of the traditional region of Styria. It is now included in the Drava Statistical Region.

The local church is dedicated to John the Baptist and was originally the chapel of Traun (Dranek) Castle. It dates to the 12th and 13th centuries and is a typical Romanesque church with a rectangular nave, a lower sanctuary, and a simple belfry next to its northern side. The foundations of Dranek Castle are barely visible. It was a castle built in the 12th century, mentioned in written sources dating to 1147 and was demolished by Ottoman raiders in 1532.

The climate is hemiboreal. The average temperature is 10 °C. The warmest month is July, at 22 °C, and the coldest is December, at −4 °C. The average rainfall is 1,489 mm per year. The wettest month is September, with 201 mm of rainfall, and the driest is March, with 65 mm.
