= Velika Varnica =

- Location in Slovenia
- Coordinates: 46°18′16.99″N 15°55′50.06″E
- Country: Slovenia
- Traditional region: Styria
- Statistical region: Drava
- Municipality: Videm

Area
  - Total: 6.52 km^{2} (2.52 sq mi)
- Elevation: 309.6 m (1,016 ft)

Population (2002)
  - Total: 223

Velika Varnica (pronounced [ˈʋeːlika ˈʋaːɾnitsa]) is a settlement in the Haloze Hills in eastern Slovenia. It lies on the border with Croatia in the Municipality of Videm. The area is part of the traditional region of Styria. It is now included in the Drava Statistical Region.

There are two churches on a hill to the south of the settlement, right on the Croatian border. One is dedicated to Saint Augustine and the other to Mary Magdalene. Both were built in the early 19th century.
