= Trniče =

- Location in Slovenia
- Coordinates: 46°27′2.12″N 15°44′34.84″E
- Country: Slovenia
- Traditional region: Styria
- Statistical region: Drava
- Municipality: Starše

Area
  - Total: 2.7 km^{2} (1.0 sq mi)
- Elevation: 247.5 m (812 ft)

Population (2002)
  - Total: 408

Trniče (pronounced [təɾˈniːtʃɛ], in older sources also Terniče, German: Ternitschen) is a village in the Municipality of Starše in northeastern Slovenia. The area is part of the traditional region of Styria. It is now included in the Drava Statistical Region.

The village chapel with a small belfry was built in 1890.
