= Fram (river) =

Framski potok

Location
- Country: Slovenia

Physical characteristics
- Mouth
  - location: Polskava
  - coordinates: 46.3672°N 15.7706°E
- Length: 26 km (16 mi)
- Basin size: 43 km^{2} (17 sq mi)

Basin features
- Progression: Polskava→ Dravinja→ Drava→ Danube→ Black Sea

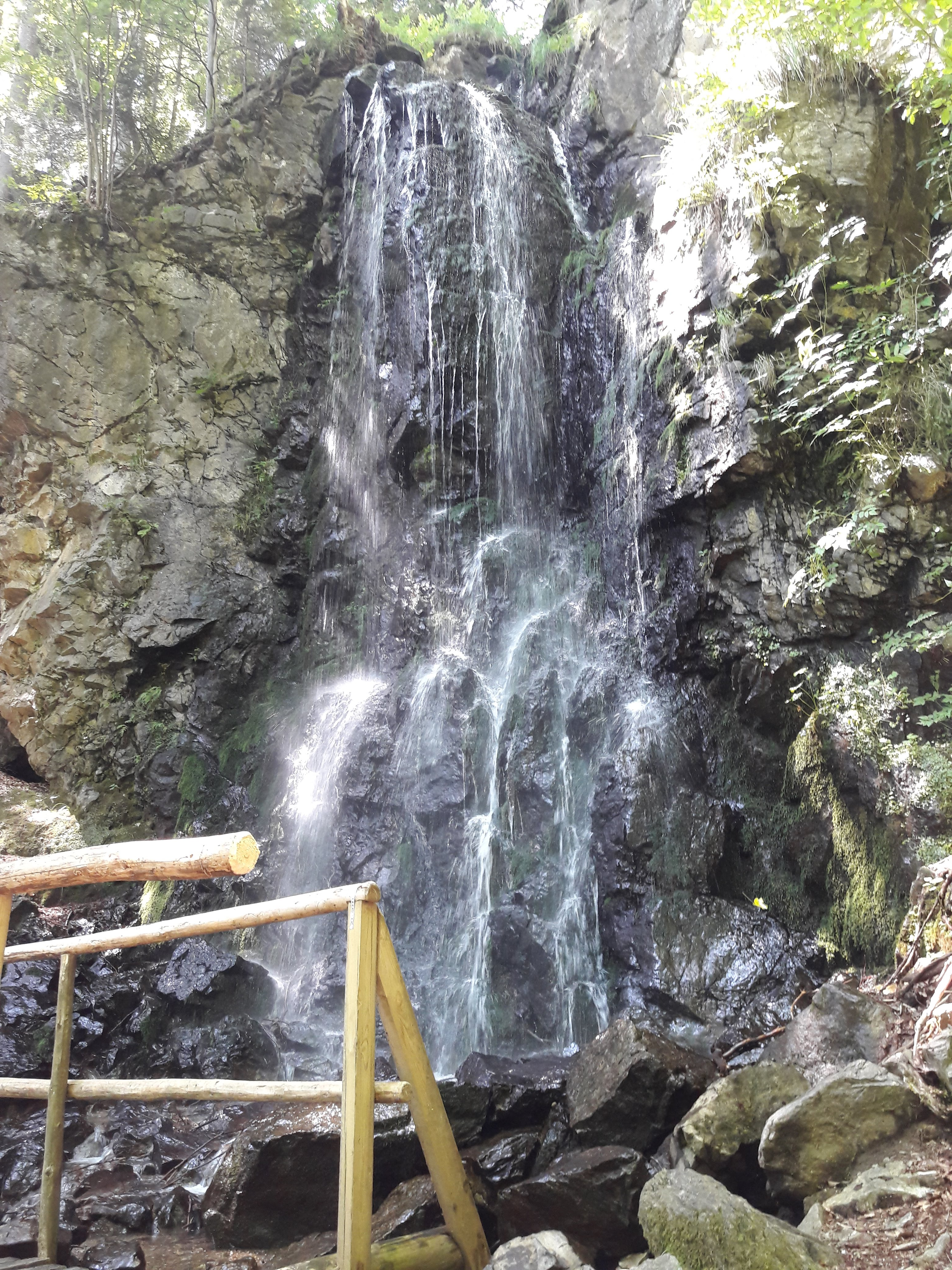
Slap Skalce, Fram creek, Slovenia

Fram Creek (Slovene: Framski potok) is a stream in Styria, Slovenia. It is 26 kilometres (16 mi) in length. Its source is on the Pohorje Massif, near Sveti Areh in the Maribor Pohorje Ski Resort. It passes Fram and Rače and merges with other streams of the Drava Plain (Dravsko polje) and joins the Polskava River near Župečja Vas.
