= Barislovci =

- Location in Slovenia
- Coordinates: 46°22′11.65″N 15°49′53.75″E
- Country: Slovenia
- Traditional region: Styria
- Statistical region: Drava
- Municipality: Videm

Area
  - Total: 0.48 km^{2} (0.19 sq mi)
- Elevation: 229.2 m (752 ft)

Population (2002)
  - Total: 132

Barislovci (pronounced [baˈɾiːslɔʋtsi]; sometimes Barislavci) is a small settlement on the left bank of the Polskava River in the Municipality of Videm south of Ptuj in eastern Slovenia. The area is part of the traditional region of Styria. It is now included in the Drava Statistical Region.

The local church is dedicated to the Holy Family and belongs to the Parish of Sveti Vid pri Ptuju. It was built in 1904 in the Neo-Gothic style.
