= Repišče =

- Location in Slovenia
- Coordinates: 46°20′33″N 15°57′11.87″E
- Country: Slovenia
- Traditional region: Styria
- Statistical region: Drava
- Municipality: Videm

Area
  - Total: 1.8 km^{2} (0.69 sq mi)
- Elevation: 291.8 m (957 ft)

Population (2002)
  - Total: 130

Repišče (pronounced [ˈɾeːpiʃtʃɛ], in older sources Repiče, German: Repitsche) is a settlement in the Haloze Hills in the Municipality of Videm in eastern Slovenia. The area is part of the traditional region of Styria. It is now included in the Drava Statistical Region.

Two small chapel-shrines in the settlement, one close to house no. 9 and the other next to house no. 25, were built in 1863 and 1909, respectively.
