= Municipality of Kobilje =

Municipality of Slovenia

Municipality of Kobilje Občina Kobilje
- Municipality
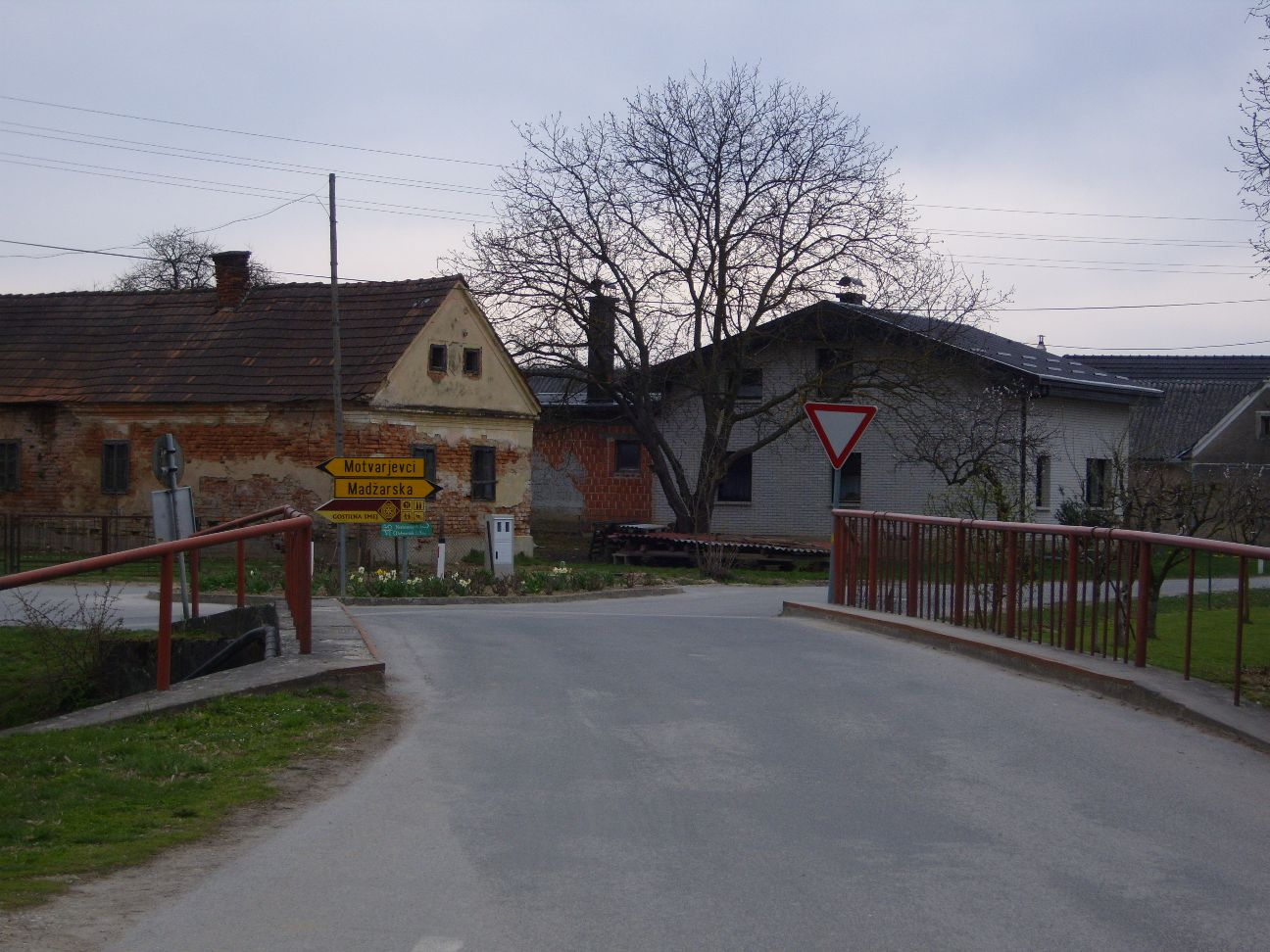

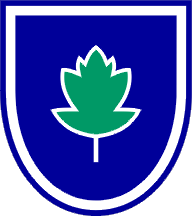
- Coat of arms

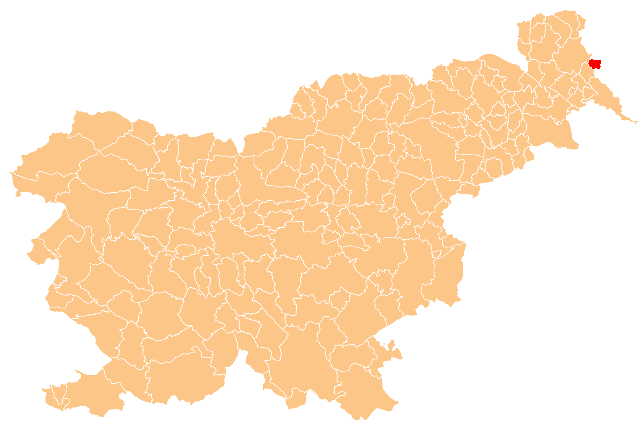
- Location of the Municipality of Kobilje in Slovenia
- Coordinates: 46°41′N 16°24′E
- Country: Slovenia

Government
  - Mayor: Darko Horvat, mag. (Independent)

Area
  - Total: 19.7 km^{2} (7.6 sq mi)

Population (2020)
  - Total: 545
  - Density: 27.7/km^{2} (71.7/sq mi)
- Time zone: UTC+01 (CET)
  - Summer (DST): UTC+02 (CEST)
- Website: www.kobilje.si

The Municipality of Kobilje (pronounced [ˈkoːbiljɛ]; Slovene: Občina Kobilje) is a municipality in the traditional region of Prekmurje in northeastern Slovenia. Its seat and only settlement is Kobilje. It was formed in 1994, when it was split from the Municipality of Lendava.
