= Municipality of Videm =

Municipality of Slovenia

Municipality of Videm Občina Videm
- Municipality
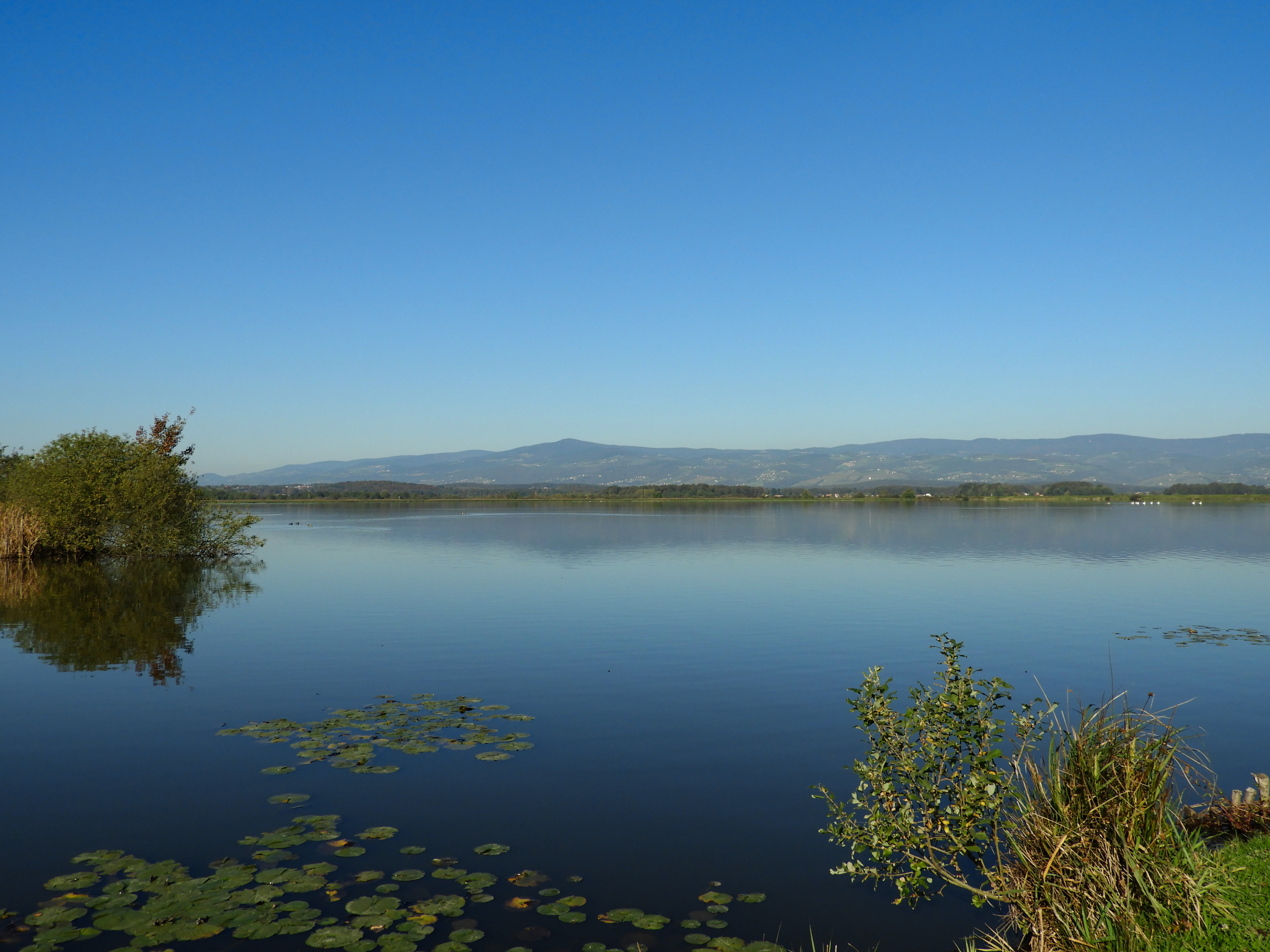

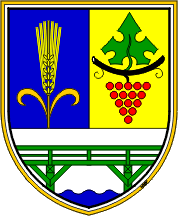
- Coat of arms

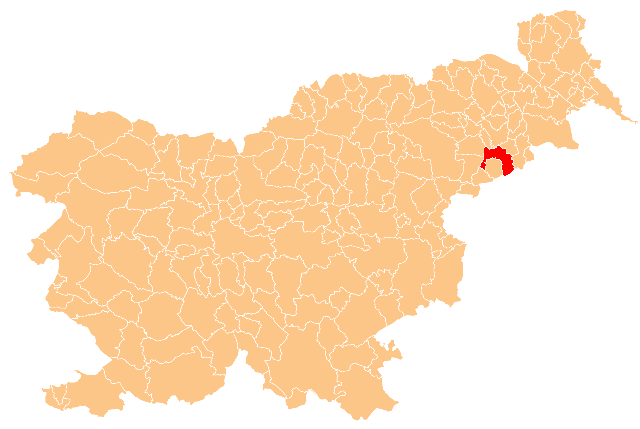
- Location of the Municipality of Videm in Slovenia
- Coordinates: 46°22′N 15°54′E
- Country: Slovenia

Government
  - Mayor: Branko Marinič

Area
  - Total: 80.2 km^{2} (31.0 sq mi)

Population (2019)
  - Total: 5,587
  - Density: 69.7/km^{2} (180/sq mi)
- Time zone: UTC+01 (CET)
  - Summer (DST): UTC+02 (CEST)
- Website: videm.si

The Municipality of Videm (pronounced [ˈʋiːdəm]) is a municipality in Slovenia. It includes part of the flatlands south of Ptuj and extends beyond the Dravinja River into the Haloze Hills to the south. The area belongs to the traditional region of Styria. It is now included in the Drava Statistical Region. The administrative centre of the municipality is the settlement of Videm pri Ptuju. It borders Croatia.

== Settlements ==
In addition to the town of Videm pri Ptuju, the municipality also includes the following settlements:

- Barislovci
- Belavšek
- Berinjak
- Dolena
- Dravci
- Dravinjski Vrh
- Gradišče
- Jurovci
- Lancova Vas
- Ljubstava
- Majski Vrh
- Mala Varnica
- Pobrežje
- Popovci
- Repišče
- Sela
- Skorišnjak
- Soviče
- Spodnji Leskovec
- Strmec pri Leskovcu
- Šturmovci
- Trdobojci
- Trnovec
- Tržec
- Vareja
- Velika Varnica
- Veliki Okič
- Zgornja Pristava
- Zgornji Leskovec
