= Dravci =

- Location in Slovenia
- Coordinates: 46°21′33.67″N 15°56′58.9″E
- Country: Slovenia
- Traditional region: Styria
- Statistical region: Drava
- Municipality: Videm

Area
  - Total: 0.98 km^{2} (0.38 sq mi)
- Elevation: 221.1 m (725 ft)

Population (2002)
  - Total: 58

Dravci (pronounced [ˈdɾaːu̯tsi]) is a settlement on the right bank of the Drava River at its confluence with the Dravinja in the Municipality of Videm in eastern Slovenia. The area is part of the traditional region of Styria. It is now included in the Drava Statistical Region.
