= Dravski Dvor =

- Location in Slovenia
- Coordinates: 46°28′1.49″N 15°42′38.46″E
- Country: Slovenia
- Traditional region: Styria
- Statistical region: Drava
- Municipality: Miklavž na Dravskem Polju

Area
  - Total: 1.9 km^{2} (0.73 sq mi)
- Elevation: 254.9 m (836 ft)

Population (2002)
  - Total: 573

Dravski Dvor (pronounced [ˈdɾaːu̯ski ˈdʋoːɾ]) is a settlement in the Municipality of Miklavž na Dravskem Polju in northeastern Slovenia. The area is part of the traditional region of Styria. The municipality is now included in the Drava Statistical Region.
