= Vareja =

- Location in Slovenia
- Coordinates: 46°21′38.74″N 15°55′54.89″E
- Country: Slovenia
- Traditional region: Styria
- Statistical region: Drava
- Municipality: Videm

Area
  - Total: 4.02 km^{2} (1.55 sq mi)
- Elevation: 279.6 m (917 ft)

Population (2002)
  - Total: 145

Vareja (pronounced [ʋaˈɾɛːja] or [ʋaˈɾeːja]) is a settlement in the Haloze Hills above the right bank of the Deavinja River in the Municipality of Videm in eastern Slovenia. The area is part of the traditional region of Styria. It is now included in the Drava Statistical Region.
