= Gradišče, Videm =

Gradišče
- Location in Slovenia
- Coordinates: 46°18′1″N 15°57′21″E
- Country: Slovenia
- Traditional region: Styria
- Statistical region: Drava
- Municipality: Videm

Area
  - Total: 1.45 km^{2} (0.56 sq mi)
- Elevation: 322.9 m (1,059 ft)

Population (2002)
  - Total: 45

Gradišče (pronounced [ɡɾaˈdiːʃtʃɛ]) is a settlement in the Haloze Hills in the Municipality of Videm in eastern Slovenia, next to the border with Croatia. The area is part of the traditional region of Styria. It is now included in the Drava Statistical Region.
