= Mala Varnica =

- Location in Slovenia
- Coordinates: 46°18′44.56″N 15°56′24.65″E
- Country: Slovenia
- Traditional region: Styria
- Statistical region: Drava
- Municipality: Videm

Area
  - Total: 2.2 km^{2} (0.85 sq mi)
- Elevation: 230.4 m (756 ft)

Population (2002)
  - Total: 111

Mala Varnica (pronounced [ˈmaːla ˈʋaːɾnitsa]) is a settlement in the Haloze Hills in the Municipality of Videm in eastern Slovenia. The area is part of the traditional region of Styria. It is now included in the Drava Statistical Region.
