= Jurovci =

- Location in Slovenia
- Coordinates: 46°21′25.09″N 15°51′53.27″E
- Country: Slovenia
- Traditional region: Styria
- Statistical region: Drava
- Municipality: Videm

Area
  - Total: 1.78 km^{2} (0.69 sq mi)
- Elevation: 230.8 m (757 ft)

Population (2002)
  - Total: 154

Jurovci (pronounced [ˈjuːɾɔu̯tsi]) is a settlement on the left bank of the Dravinja River in the Municipality of Videm in eastern Slovenia. The area is part of the traditional region of Styria. It is now included in the Drava Statistical Region.
