= Municipality of Starše =

Municipality of Slovenia

Municipality of Starše Občina Starše
- Municipality
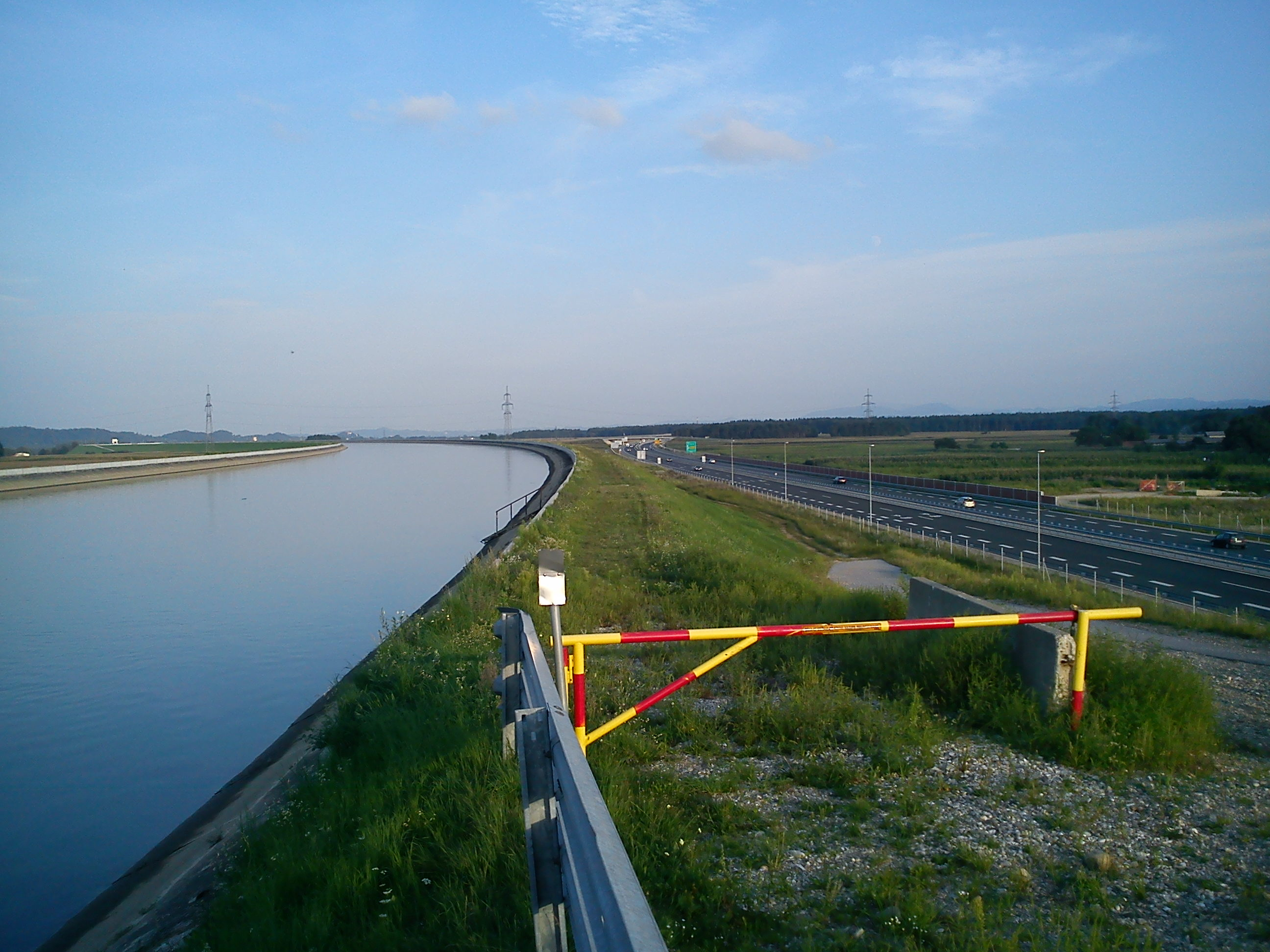

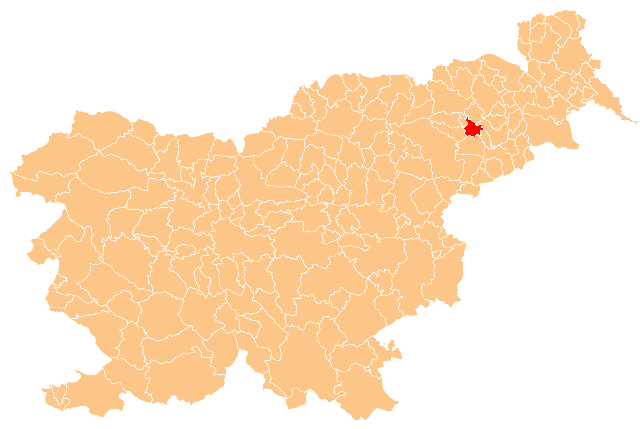
- Location of the Municipality of Starše in Slovenia
- Coordinates: 46°27′N 15°45′E
- Country: Slovenia

Government
  - Mayor: Stanislav Greifoner

Area
  - Total: 34.0 km^{2} (13.1 sq mi)

Population (July 1, 2018)
  - Total: 3,975
  - Density: 117/km^{2} (303/sq mi)
- Time zone: UTC+01 (CET)
  - Summer (DST): UTC+02 (CEST)
- Website: www.starse.si

The Municipality of Starše (pronounced [ˈstaːɾʃɛ]; Slovene: Občina Starše) is a municipality in the traditional region of Styria in northeastern Slovenia. The seat of the municipality is the town of Starše. Starše became a municipality in 1994.

== Settlements ==
In addition to the municipal seat of Starše, the municipality also includes the following settlements:

- Brunšvik
- Loka
- Marjeta na Dravskem Polju
- Prepolje
- Rošnja
- Trniče
- Zlatoličje
