= Kerka =

Kerka Krka
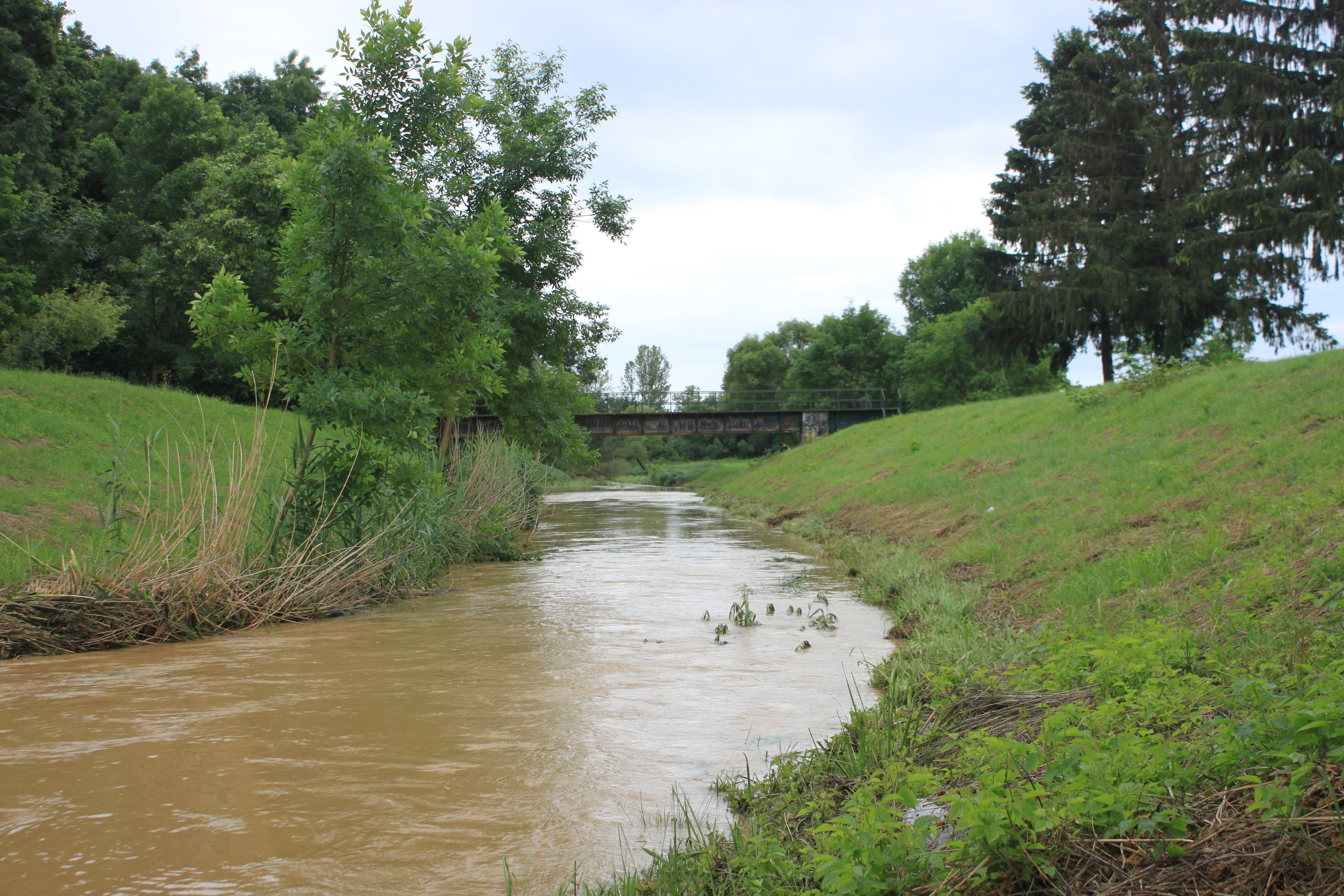

Location
- Countries: Hungary and Slovenia

Physical characteristics
- Mouth
  - location: Ledava
  - coordinates: 46°28′37″N 16°35′41″E

Basin features
- Progression: Ledava→ Mur→ Drava→ Danube→ Black Sea

The Kerka (Slovene: Krka; Hungarian: Kerka, Kerkás; Prekmurje Slovene: Kerka) is a river of Slovenia and Hungary. It is a left tributary of the Ledava near Kerkaszentkirály. In its upper course, upstream from its confluence with the Little Kerka (Slovene: Mala Krka; Hungarian: Kerca, Kis-Kerka) south of Bajánsenye, it is also called Big Kerka (Slovene: Velika Krka; Hungarian: Nagy-Kerka; Prekmurje Slovene: Velka Kerka). The river is about 60 km (37 miles) long.

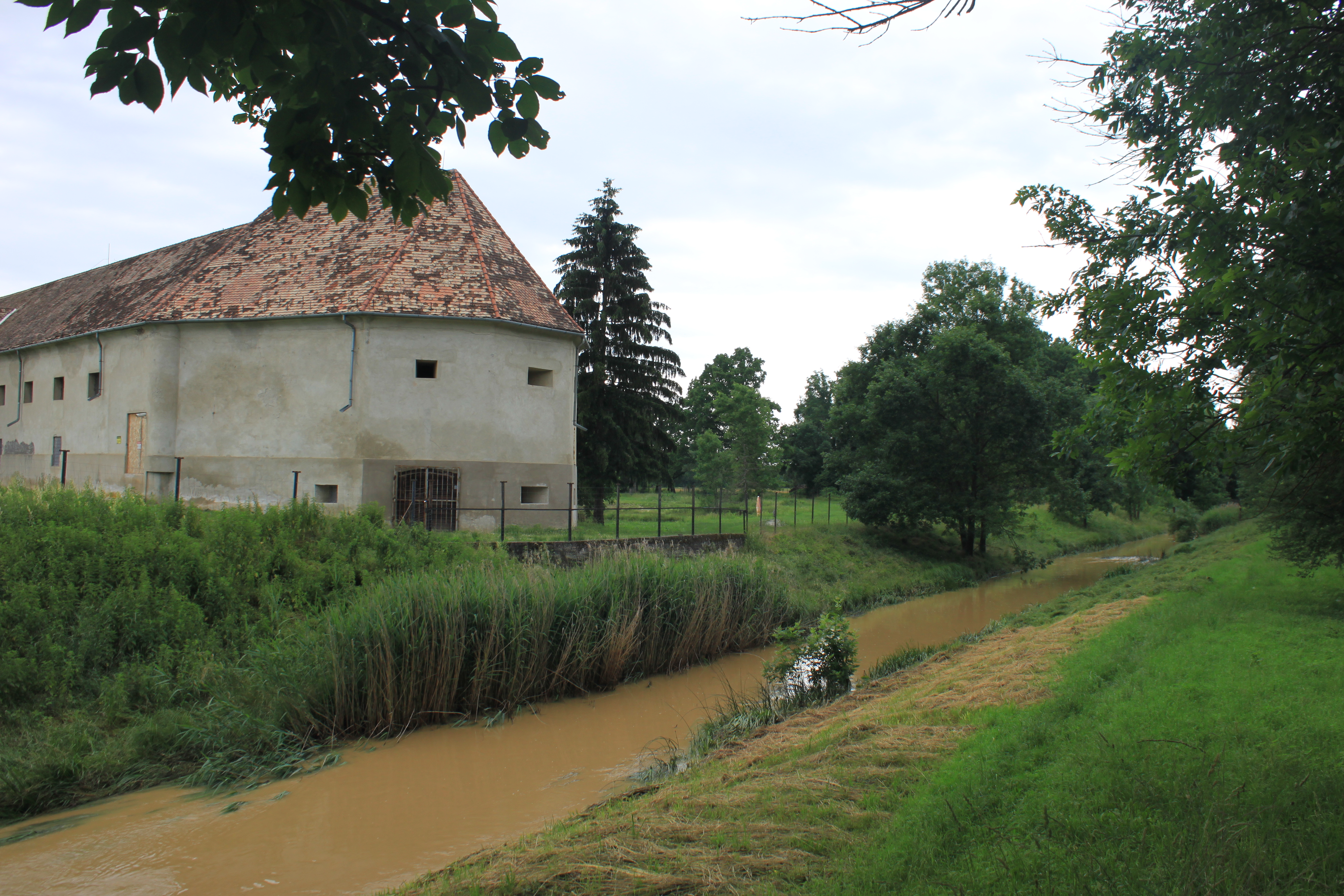
The River Kerka at Lenti Castle (also Kerka Castle), Lenti, Zala Komitat (County), Hungary; upstream, looking north.

== See also ==
- List of rivers of Slovenia

== Bibliography ==
- Borovszky, Samu; Sziklay, János; Csánki, Dezső (1898). Magyarország vármegyéi és városai (in Hungarian). Budapest: Országos Monográfia Társaság.
