= Municipality of Miklavž na Dravskem Polju =

Municipality of Slovenia

Municipality of Miklavž na Dravskem Polju Občina Miklavž na Dravskem polju
- Municipality
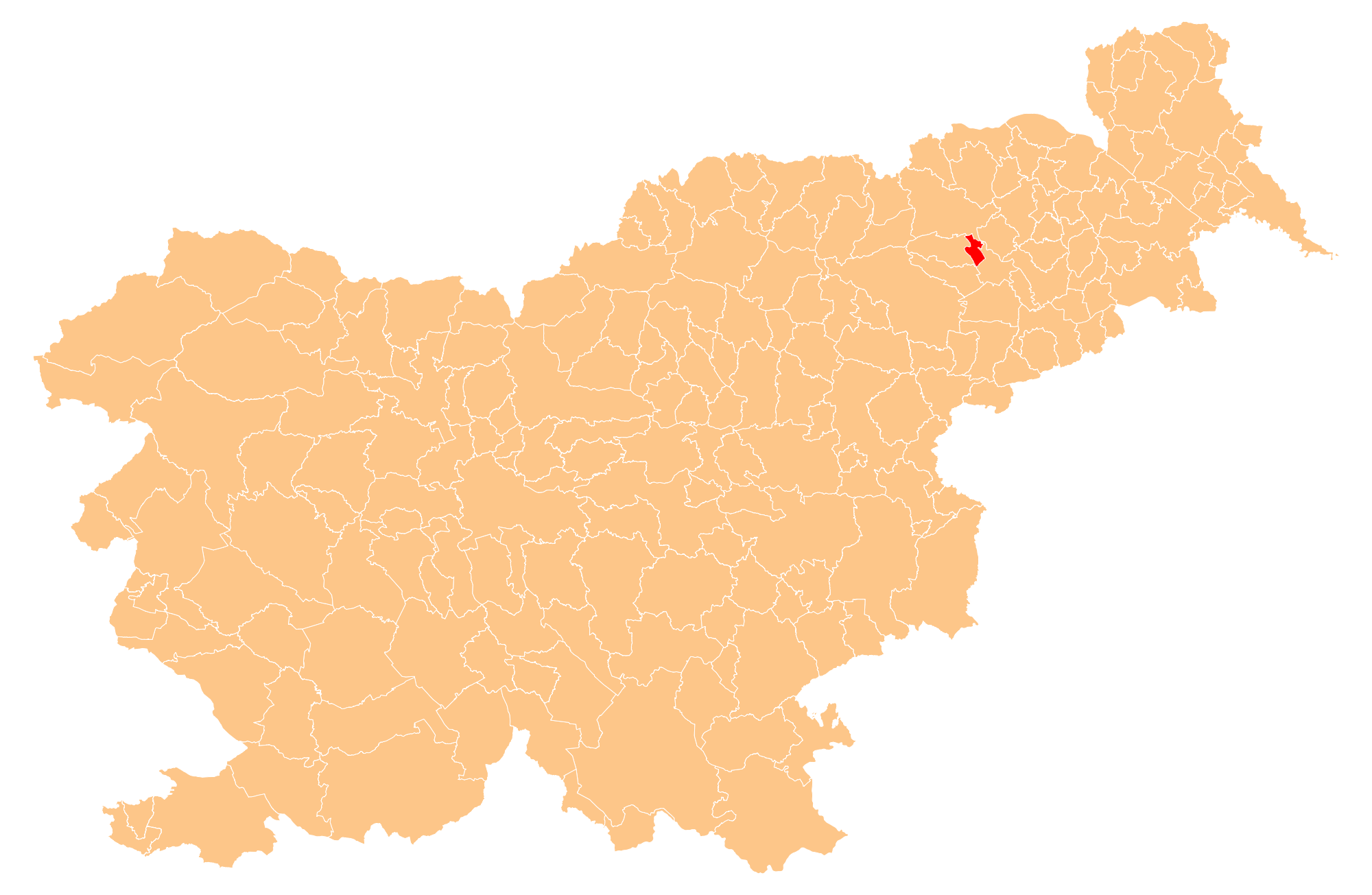
- Location of the Municipality of Miklavž na Dravskem Polju in Slovenia
- Coordinates: 46°30′N 15°42′E
- Country: Slovenia

Government
  - Mayor: Leopold Kremžar (Independent)

Area
  - Total: 12.5 km^{2} (4.8 sq mi)

Population (2002)
  - Total: 5,915
  - Density: 473/km^{2} (1,230/sq mi)
- Time zone: UTC+01 (CET)
  - Summer (DST): UTC+02 (CEST)
- Website: www.miklavz.si

The Municipality of Miklavž na Dravskem Polju (Slovene: Občina Miklavž na Dravskem polju) is a small municipality in northeastern Slovenia. It lies on the right bank of the Drava River southeast of Maribor. The seat of the municipality is the settlement of Miklavž na Dravskem Polju. The area is part of the traditional region of Lower Styria. It is now included in the Drava Statistical Region.

== Geography ==
The entire municipality lies on the Drava Plain (Dravsko polje), which is part of the sub-Pannonian region of Slovenia and is geographically a transition between the sub-Pannonian and sub-Alpine regions. To the west it borders on the Pohorje Massif, to the northwest on the Drava Valley, to the north and east on the Slovene Hills, and to the southeast on the Ptuj Plain (Ptujsko polje). The far northeastern part of the municipality lies on the alluvial plain of the Drava River, and the rest lies on gravel plains.

=== Settlements ===
In addition to the municipal seat of Miklavž na Dravskem Polju, the municipality also includes the settlements of Dobrovce, Dravski Dvor, and Skoke.
