= Skorišnjak =

- Location in Slovenia
- Coordinates: 46°18′48.66″N 15°57′17.07″E
- Country: Slovenia
- Traditional region: Styria
- Statistical region: Drava
- Municipality: Videm

Area
  - Total: 1.3 km^{2} (0.50 sq mi)
- Elevation: 313.7 m (1,029 ft)

Population (2002)
  - Total: 65

Skorišnjak (pronounced [skɔɾiˈʃnjaːk]) is a settlement in the Haloze Hills in eastern Slovenia, close to the border with Croatia. It belongs to the Municipality of Videm. The area is part of the traditional region of Styria. It is now included in the Drava Statistical Region.

There is a small rectangular chapel with a semicircular apse and a belfry in the settlement. It was built in the early 20th century.
