= Loka, Starše =

Loka
- Location in Slovenia
- Coordinates: 46°29′15.22″N 15°43′47.42″E
- Country: Slovenia
- Traditional region: Styria
- Statistical region: Drava
- Municipality: Starše

Area
  - Total: 3.55 km^{2} (1.37 sq mi)
- Elevation: 243.2 m (798 ft)

Population (2002)
  - Total: 265

Loka (pronounced [ˈloːka]) is a settlement in the Municipality of Starše in the Styria region of Slovenia.
