= Skoke =

- Location in Slovenia
- Coordinates: 46°29′5.96″N 15°41′42.1″E
- Country: Slovenia
- Traditional region: Styria
- Statistical region: Drava
- Municipality: Miklavž na Dravskem Polju

Area
  - Total: 1.69 km^{2} (0.65 sq mi)
- Elevation: 258.9 m (849 ft)

Population (2002)
  - Total: 812

Skoke (pronounced [ˈskoːkɛ]) is a village in the Municipality of Miklavž na Dravskem Polju in northeastern Slovenia. The area is part of the traditional region of Styria. The municipality is now included in the Drava Statistical Region.

The village chapel-shrine, built at the crossroads at the centre of the settlement, dates to the second half of the 19th century.
