= Rinža =

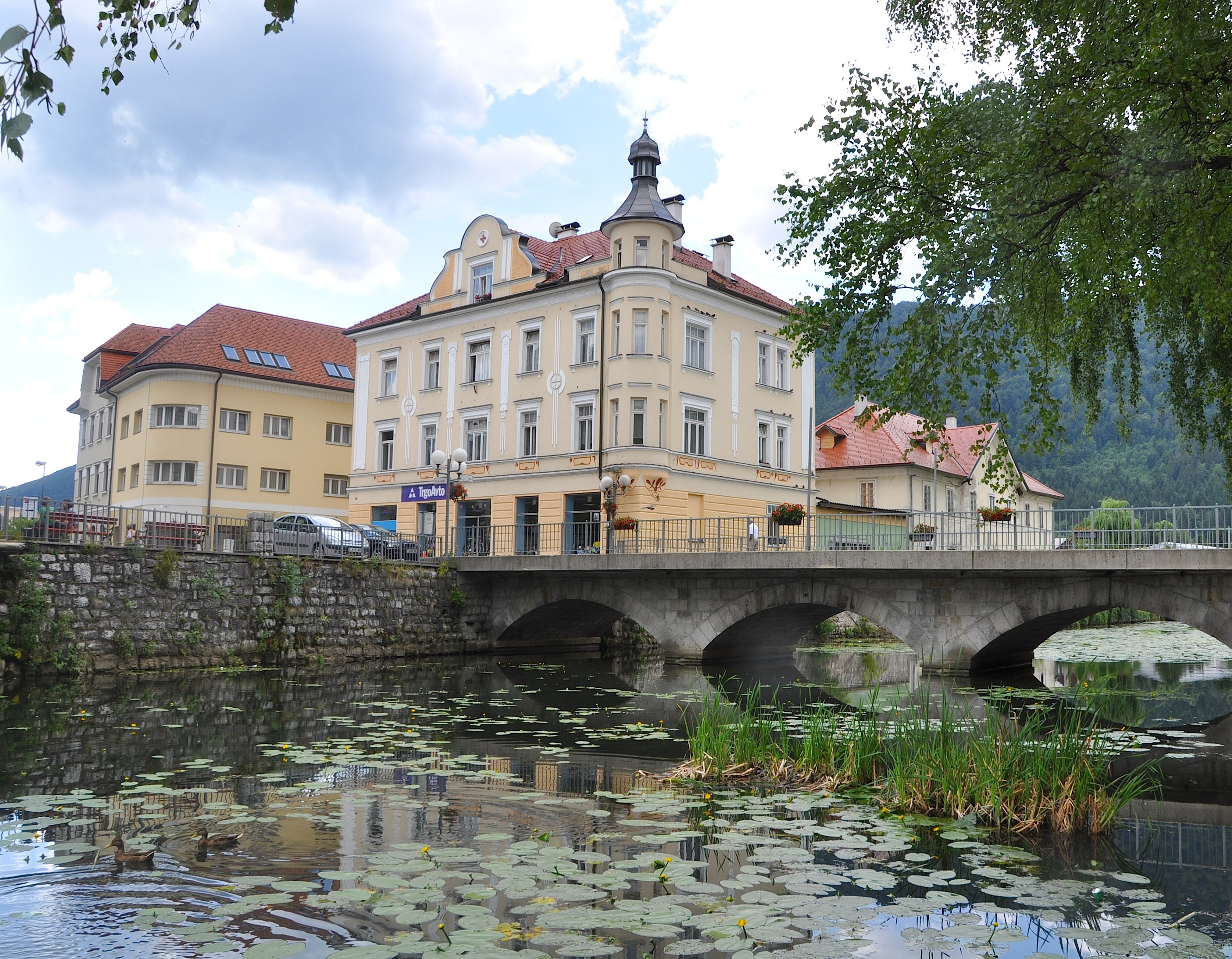
- The Rinža in Kočevje

Location
- Country: Slovenia

Physical characteristics
- Mouth
  - location: sinkhole
  - coordinates: 45°36′N 14°54′E
- Length: 14 km (8.7 mi)

Basin features
- Progression: sinkhole→ Bilpa→ Kupa→ Sava→ Danube→ Black Sea

The Rinža (German: Rinse, Rinnse) is a river of Slovenia. It is 14 kilometres (8.7 mi) long and flows through Kočevje. It is the main watercourse of the Kočevje Polje and it is a losing stream. A few kilometers downstream of Kočevje, it goes subterranean. It emerges again as the Bilpa, a tributary of the Kolpa (Kupa).

== See also ==
- List of rivers of Slovenia
