= Radulja =

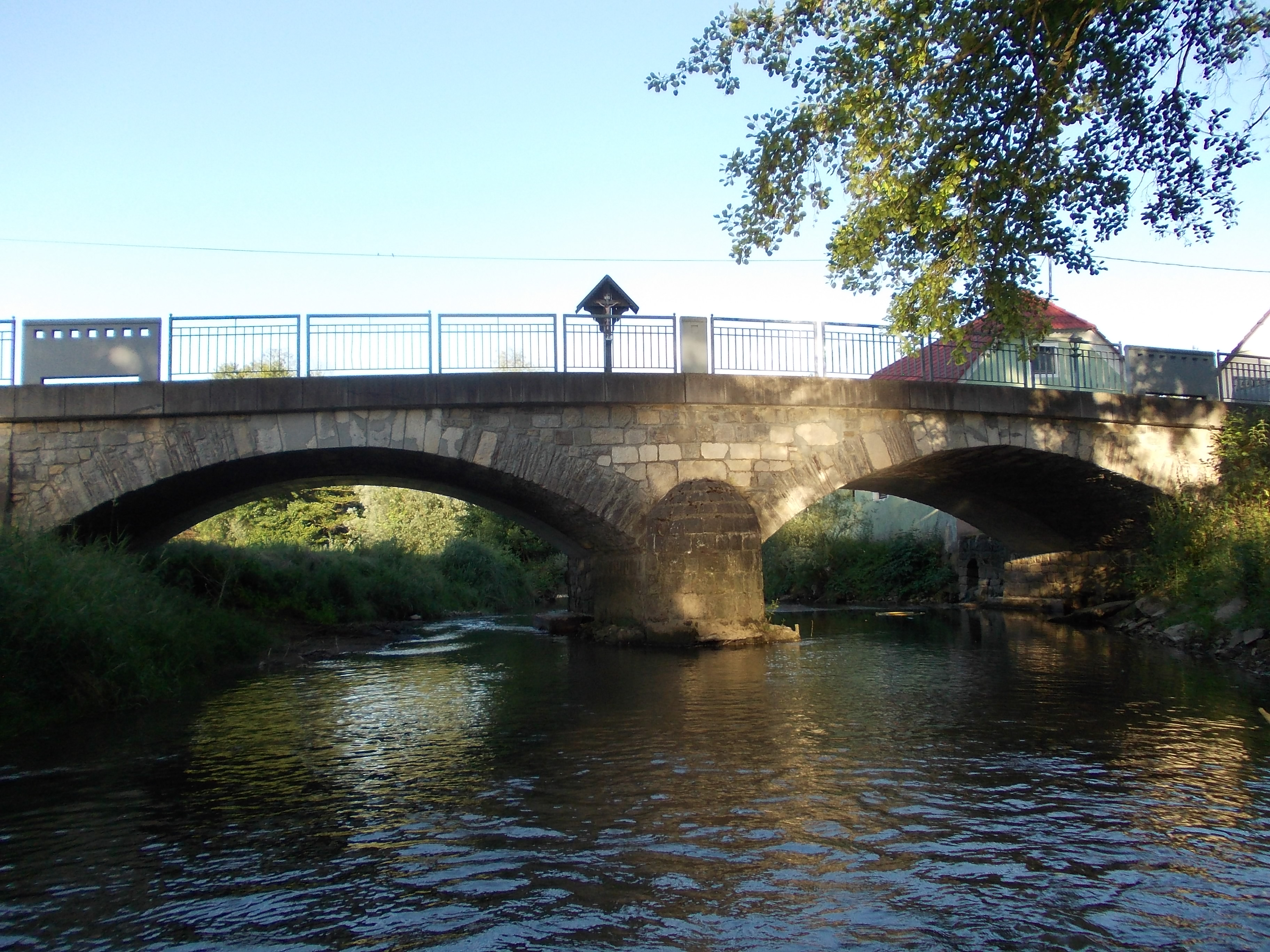

Location
- Country: Slovenia

Physical characteristics
- Mouth
  - location: Krka
  - coordinates: 45.8752°N 15.3308°E
- Length: 33 km (21 mi)
- Basin size: 118 km^{2} (46 sq mi)

Basin features
- Progression: Krka→ Sava→ Danube→ Black Sea

The Radulja is a river of Slovenia. The river is 33 km (21 mi) in length. It is a left tributary of the Krka River.
