= Miklavž na Dravskem Polju =

Miklavž na Dravskem Polju Sveti Miklavž (until 1955)
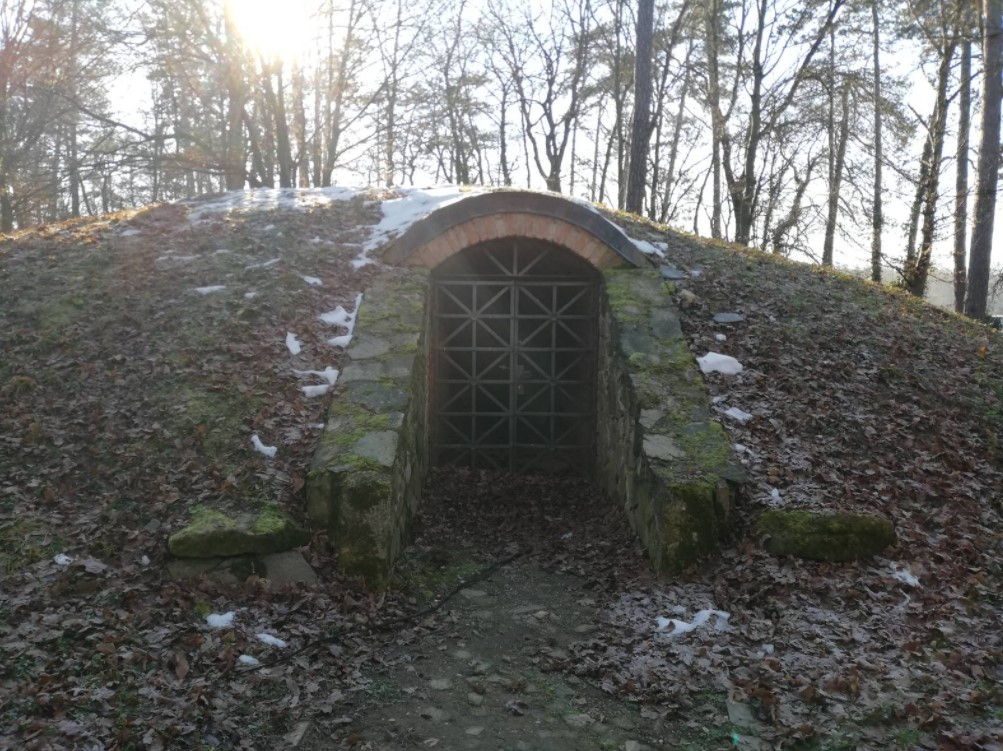

- Location in Slovenia
- Coordinates: 46°30′20.69″N 15°41′57.60″E
- Country: Slovenia
- Traditional region: Styria
- Statistical region: Drava
- Municipality: Miklavž na Dravskem Polju

Area
  - Total: 5.0 km^{2} (1.9 sq mi)
- Elevation: 259.5 m (851 ft)

Population (2025)
  - Total: 4,558
  - Density: 950/km^{2} (2,500/sq mi)
- Postal code: 2204 Miklavž na Dravskem polju

Miklavž na Dravskem Polju (pronounced [miˈkláːwʃ na ˈdɾàːwskɛm ˈpóːlju]; Slovene: Miklavž na Dravskem polju) is the largest settlement and the seat of the Municipality of Miklavž na Dravskem Polju in northeastern Slovenia. It lies on the right bank of the Drava River southeast of Maribor. The area is part of the traditional region of Styria. It is now included in the Drava Statistical Region.

== Name ==
The name of the settlement was changed from Sveti Miklavž (literally, 'Saint Nicholas') to Miklavž na Dravskem polju (literally, 'Nicholas on the Drava Plain') in 1955. The name was changed on the basis of the 1948 Law on Names of Settlements and Designations of Squares, Streets, and Buildings as part of efforts by Slovenia's postwar communist government to remove religious elements from toponyms.

== Church ==
The parish church from which the settlement and municipality get their name is dedicated to Saint Nicholas (Slovene: sveti Miklavž) and belongs to the Roman Catholic Archdiocese of Maribor. It was first mentioned in written documents dated to 1382, but the current building is a 16th-century structure.
