= Bolska =

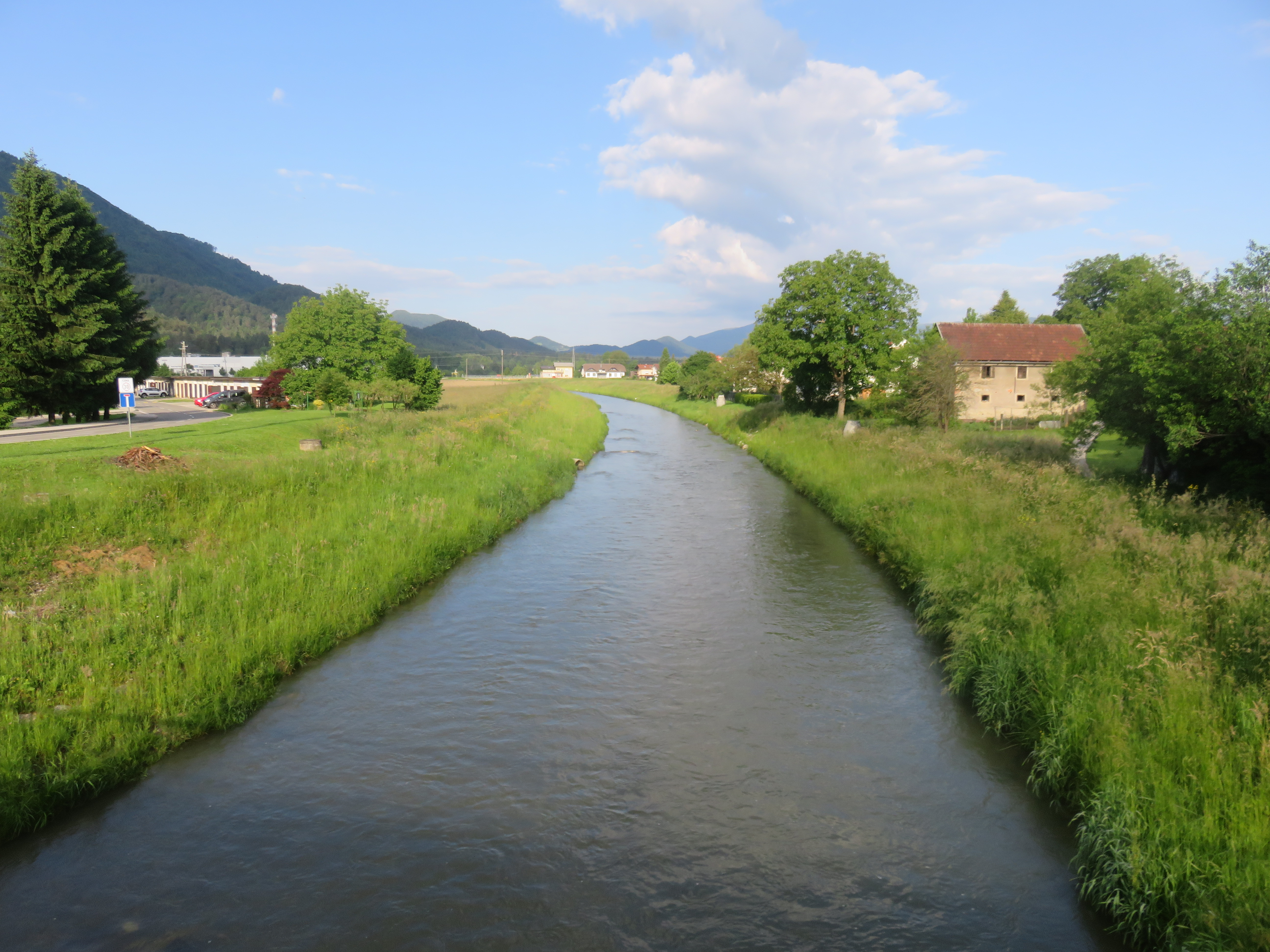
- The Bolska at Prebold

Location
- Country: Slovenia

Physical characteristics
- Mouth
  - location: Savinja
  - coordinates: 46°14′31″N 15°06′51″E
- Length: 32 km (20 mi)
- Basin size: 190 km^{2} (73 sq mi)

Basin features
- Progression: Savinja→ Sava→ Danube→ Black Sea

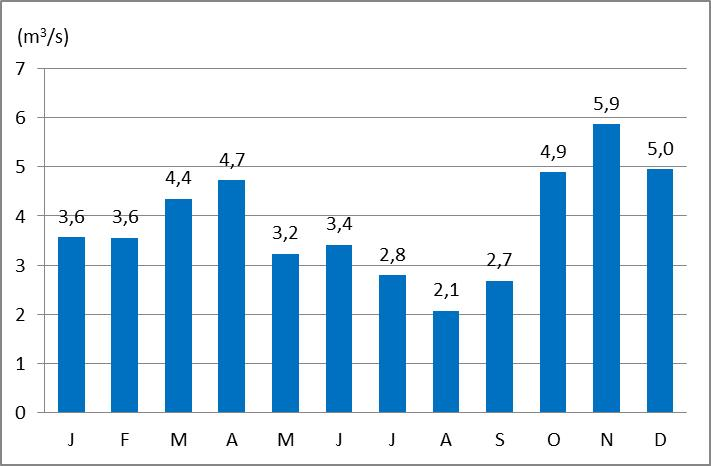
The average monthly discharge of the Bolska at Dolenja Vas (1971–2000)

The Bolska is a river in Slovenia that flows for 32 km before joining the Savinja as its largest and longest right tributary. Its watershed covers 190.3 square kilometres of transitional territory in central Slovenia, stretching from the Sava Hills to the Menina and Dobrovlje karst plateaus and extending to the southwestern edge of the Celje Basin. The river rises northwest of Trojane at an elevation of about 815 metres and descends to its confluence with the Savinja near Prebold at 264 metres. The Bolska and its numerous torrential tributaries are characterised by a pluvial regime with seasonal flooding, making the watershed particularly prone to catastrophic flood events, as demonstrated by the devastating storm of June 1994.

== Geography ==
The Bolska is the largest and longest right tributary of the Savinja River in Slovenia's Savinja Valley. Its watershed covers 190.3 square kilometres (73.5 sq mi) of transitional territory in central Slovenia. The river rises northwest of Trojane at an elevation of approximately 815 metres (2,674 ft) between Reznarca Hill (913 metres or 2,995 feet) and Javorje Hill (868 metres or 2,848 feet), and flows into the Savinja River near Prebold at 264 metres (866 ft). The total length of the Bolska is between 32 kilometres (20 mi) and 38.75 kilometres (24.08 mi), with an average gradient of 13.8 to 17.2‰.

The Bolska watershed lies between the central northern edge of the Sava Hills, the southern and eastern slopes of the Menina Plateau and the Dobrovlje karst plateau, and the southwestern extension of the Celje Basin. Geologically, it occupies the junction of three major tectonic units: the Sava fold, the young tectonic sink of the Celje Basin, and the Savinja Alps.

== Hydrology ==
The Bolska has a pluvial river regime, with highest water levels in November and December and secondary peaks in March and April. The watershed receives between 1,250 litres per square metre (26 imp gal/sq ft) and 1,500 litres per square metre (31 imp gal/sq ft) of precipitation annually, the wettest months being July and August in summer, and November in autumn.

Numerous torrential tributaries feed the river. Its right-bank tributaries, draining the area between the southern divide ridge and valley edge, include the Zaplaninščica, Kučnica and Konjščica; these typically have gradients of 26 to 38‰ and may become destructive torrents during heavy rainfall. Left-bank tributaries such as the Motnišnica and Merinščica drain the karst plateaus and display somewhat different hydrological behaviour.

== Floods and environmental impact ==
The Bolska watershed is exceptionally prone to floods, most frequently in winter. Historic catastrophic floods occurred in January 1799; between September 1842 and January 1843; in 1848; and in September 1926 and 1933.

A particularly devastating storm on 28 June 1994 dropped more than 100 litres per square metre (2.0 imp gal/sq ft) of rain in under two hours, causing all tributaries to overflow. The flood destroyed 9 kilometres (5.6 mi) of local roads, rendered 28 kilometres (17 mi) impassable and washed away 34 bridges, inundated 1,200 hectares (3,000 acres) of farmland, and damaged 176 buildings. About 450 landslides were triggered, fundamentally altering the landscape. Damage estimates reached 2.2 billion Slovenian tolars, or 4.6% of the GDP of the Žalec district.
