= Zlatoličje =

- Location in Slovenia
- Coordinates: 46°27′22.36″N 15°47′24.3″E
- Country: Slovenia
- Traditional region: Styria
- Statistical region: Drava
- Municipality: Starše

Area
  - Total: 7.1 km^{2} (2.7 sq mi)
- Elevation: 237 m (778 ft)

Population (2025)
  - Total: 751

Zlatoličje (pronounced [zlatɔˈliːtʃjɛ]) is a village on the right bank of the Drava River southeast of Maribor in northeastern Slovenia. It lies in the Municipality of Starše in an area that is part of the traditional region of Styria. The municipality is now included in the Drava Statistical Region. South of the settlement is a 136 MW run-of-the-river hydroelectricity, opened in 1969. A solar power plant is set on the river banks.

== Name ==
Zlatoličje was attested in written sources in 1220–30 and later as Goldarn (and as Goldsdorf in 1320). The Slovene name is derived from the common noun zlatolika 'golden willow' (Salix alba var. vitellina), referring to local vegetation. A less likely derivation is from Slavic *zoltolykъ 'gold seeker'.

== Cultural heritage ==
The village chapel with a small belfry was built in 1900.
