= Slivnica pri Mariboru =

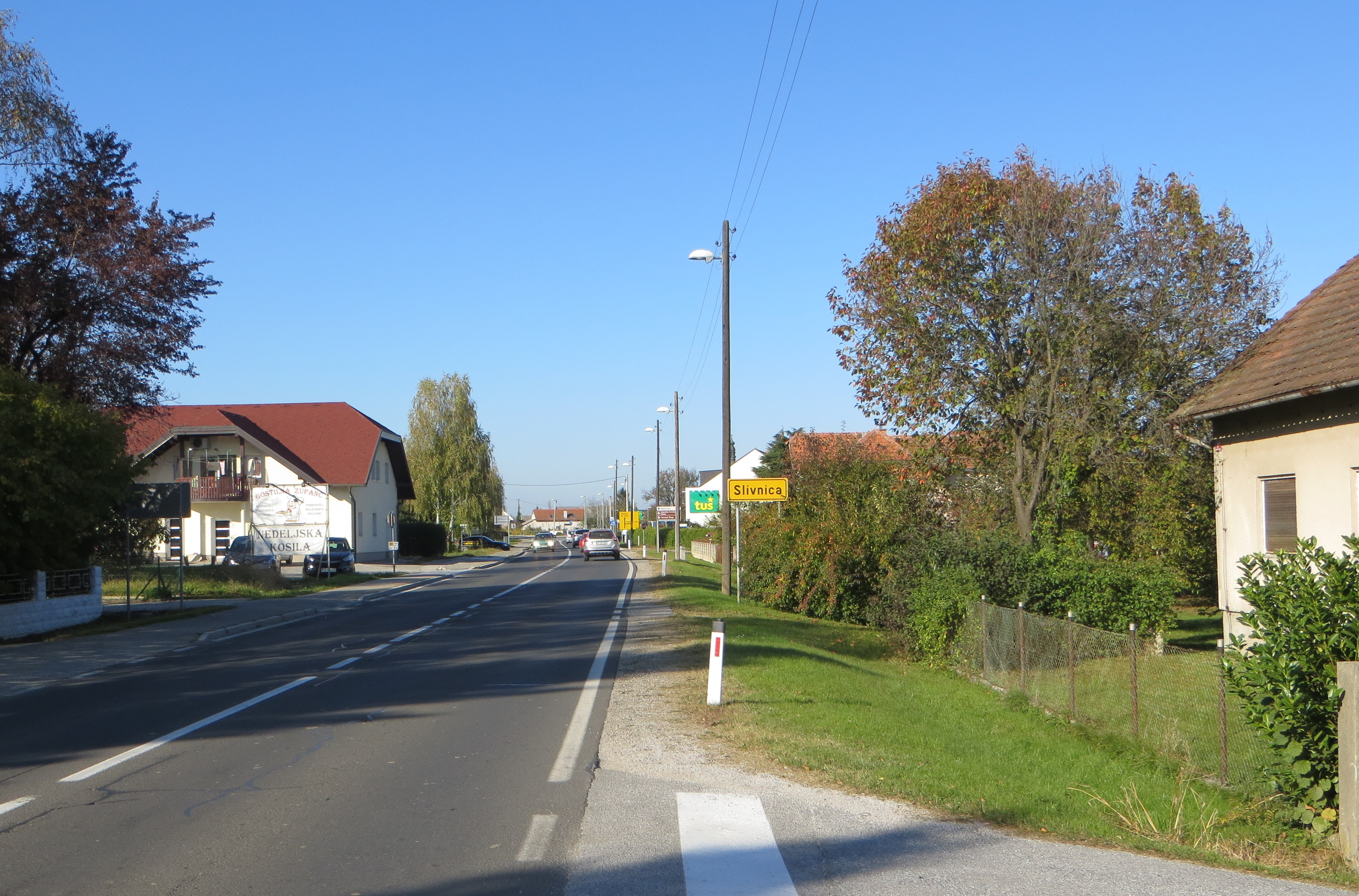

- Location in Slovenia
- Coordinates: 46°28′28.93″N 15°39′16.76″E
- Country: Slovenia
- Traditional region: Styria
- Statistical region: Drava
- Municipality: Hoče–Slivnica

Area
  - Total: 3.28 km^{2} (1.27 sq mi)
- Elevation: 279 m (915 ft)

Population (2002)
  - Total: 460

Slivnica pri Mariboru (pronounced [ˈslíːwnitsa pɾi ˈmáːɾibɔɾu]) is a settlement in the Municipality of Hoče–Slivnica in northeastern Slovenia. It lies under the eastern Pohorje Hills on the edge of the flatlands on the right bank of the Drava River south of Maribor. The A1 Motorway runs through the settlement and a major interchange with the A4 motorway is located just north of the settlement. The area is part of the traditional region of Lower Styria. The municipality is now included in the Drava Statistical Region.

The local parish church is dedicated to the Nativity of Mary (Slovene: Marijino Rojstvo) and belongs to the Roman Catholic Archdiocese of Maribor. It has a Romanesque nave dating to the 11th century and an early 16th-century Gothic sanctuary and belfry.
