= Draženci =

- Location in Slovenia
- Coordinates: 46°23′27.47″N 15°50′34.69″E
- Country: Slovenia
- Traditional region: Styria
- Statistical region: Drava
- Municipality: Hajdina

Area
  - Total: 2.9 km^{2} (1.1 sq mi)
- Elevation: 230.3 m (756 ft)

Population (2014)
  - Total: 516
  - Density: 179/km^{2} (460/sq mi)

Draženci (pronounced [ˈdɾaːʒɛntsi]) is a village in the Municipality of Hajdina in northeastern Slovenia. The area is part of the traditional region of Styria. It is now included with the rest of the municipality in the Drava Statistical Region.

== History ==
In 2005, the settlement of Lancova Vas pri Ptuju—formerly part of neighboring Lancova Vas—was annexed by Draženci.

== Cultural heritage ==
Archaeological sites near the settlement are associated with the nearby Roman town of Poetovio.
