= Kobilje Creek =

Kobilje Creek Kobiljski potok, Kebele
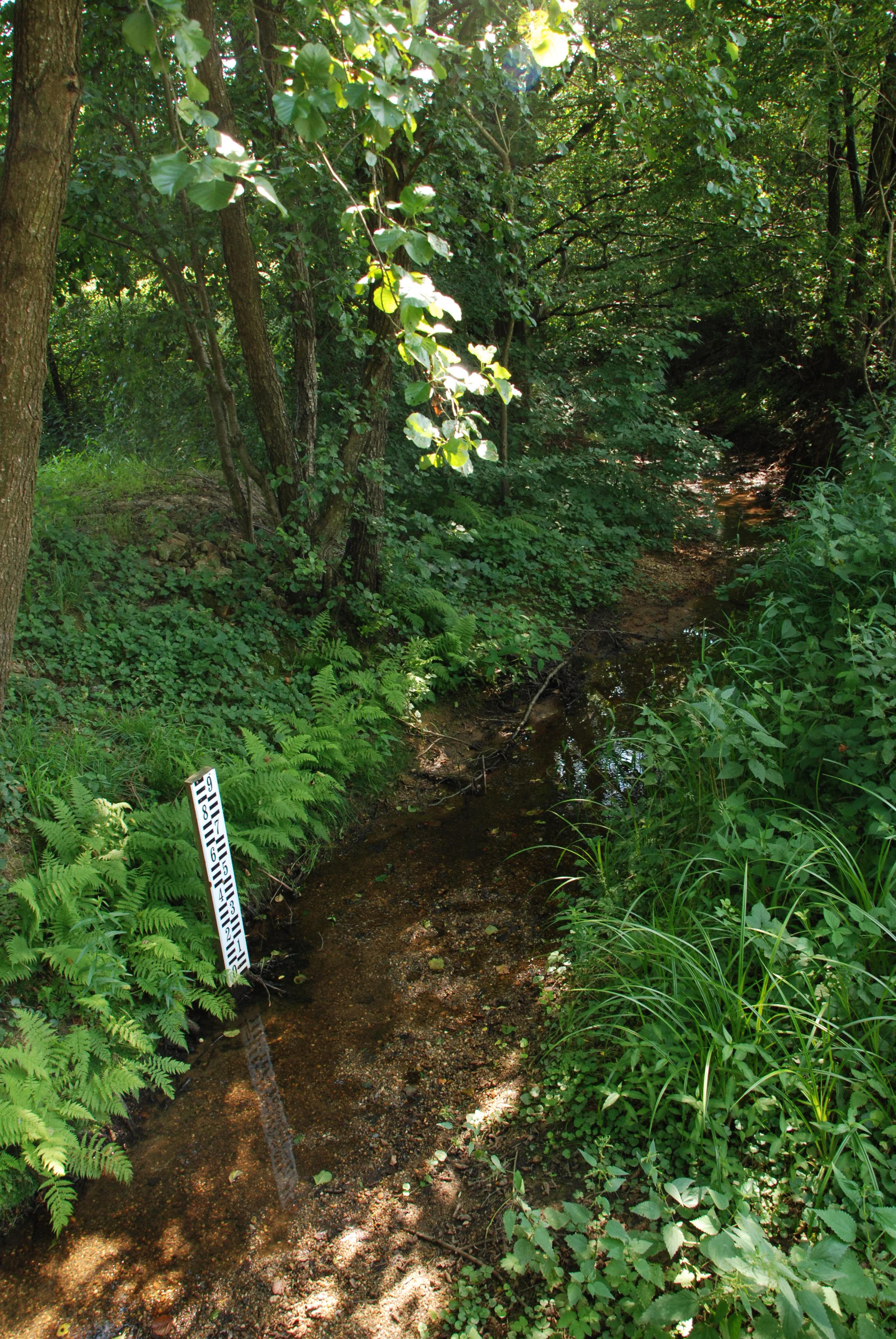
- Kobilje Creek in Selo

Location
- Countries: Hungary and Slovenia

Physical characteristics
- Mouth
  - location: Lendava
  - coordinates: 46.5576°N 16.4564°E
- Length: 33 km (21 mi)

Basin features
- Progression: Ledava→ Mur→ Drava→ Danube→ Black Sea

Kobilje Creek (Hungarian: Kebele, Slovene: Kobiljski potok or Kobiljanski potok) is a stream in northeastern Slovenia and western Hungary. The stream is 33 kilometres (21 mi) long; 24 km (15 mi) of the course is in Slovenia. Its source is at Kamenek Hill (391 metres or 1,283 feet) and it flows through Kobilje, crosses the Slovenian–Hungarian border, returns to Slovenia, and joins the Ledava from its left side in the town Lendava. It is the longest tributary of the Ledava.

== History and name ==
Kobilje Creek was first mentioned in 1208 as aguam Kobula. In 1236, it was mentioned as Kebela, in 1329 as Kebelie, and in 1338 as Kebele. Its Slovene name is derived from Slavic *kobyla 'mare'. The current Slovene names for the stream are derived from the settlement of Kobilje. However, based on medieval sources, it was originally called *Kobilja (voda) (literally, 'mare stream') and the settlement of Kobilje was named after it. The stream was then later renamed after the settlement.

== See also ==
- List of rivers of Slovenia
