= Popovci (Aleksandrovac) =

Coordinates: 43.4567°N 21.0233°E

- Village
- Interactive map of Popovci
- Country: Serbia
- District: Šumadija
- Municipality: Aleksandrovac

Population (2002)
  - Total: 92
- Time zone: UTC+1 (CET)
  - Summer (DST): UTC+2 (CEST)

Popovci (Serbian Cyrillic: Поповци) is a village in the municipality of Aleksandrovac, Serbia. According to the 2002 census, the village has a population of 92 people.

== See also ==
- List of places in Serbia
