= Bad Creek =

Stream in Georgia, United States

Coordinates: 34°44′29″N 83°20′54″W

Bad Creek is a stream in the U.S. state of Georgia. It is a tributary to the Chattooga River.

Bad Creek was so named on account of the rough terrain along its course.
