= Kobjeglava =

Kobjeglava Còbbia
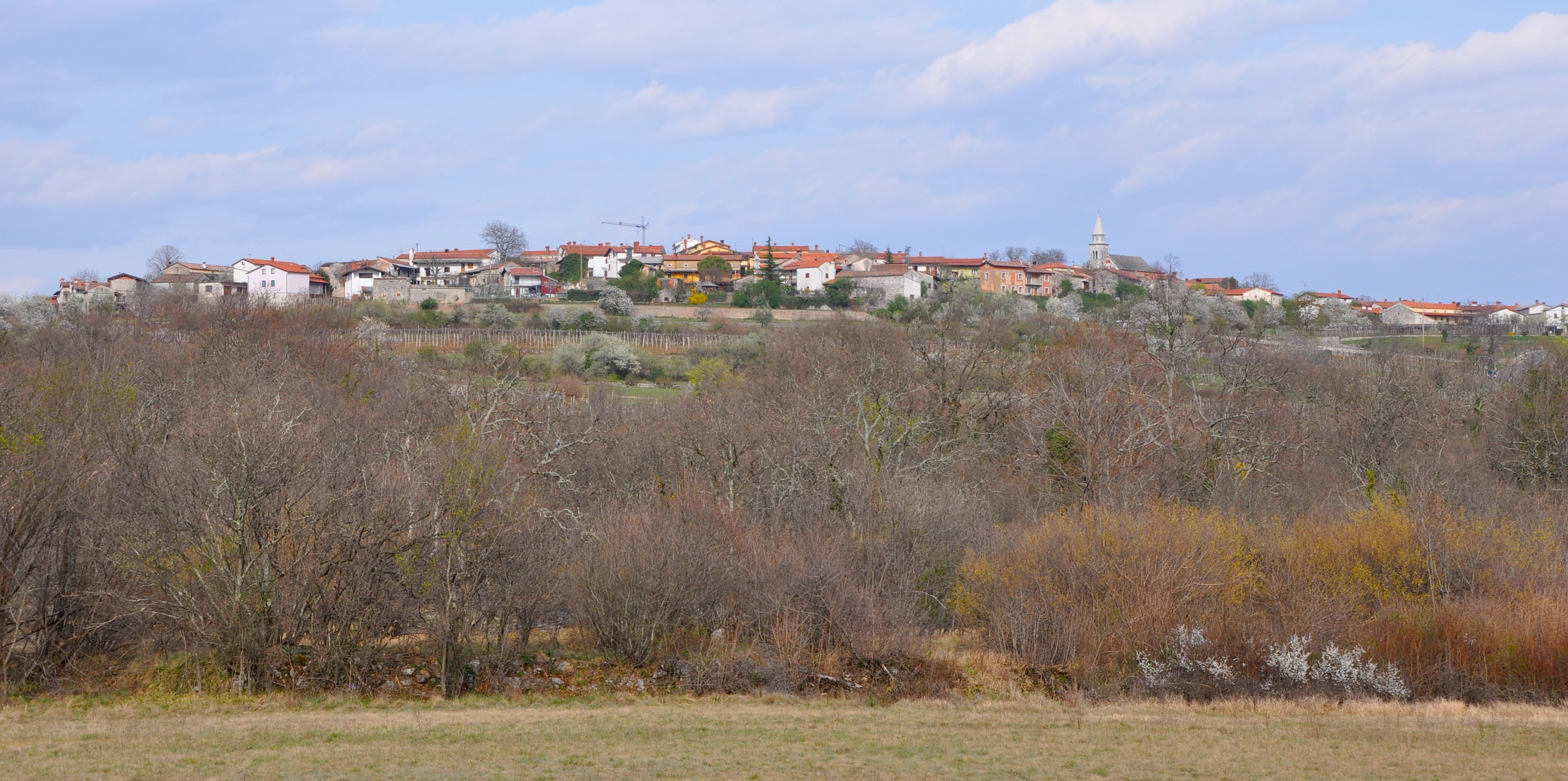

- Location in Slovenia
- Coordinates: 45°48′57.23″N 13°48′24.66″E
- Country: Slovenia
- Traditional region: Slovene Littoral
- Statistical region: Coastal–Karst
- Municipality: Komen

Area
  - Total: 6.33 km^{2} (2.44 sq mi)
- Elevation: 321.4 m (1,054 ft)

Population (2002)
  - Total: 190

Kobjeglava (pronounced [kɔbjɛˈɡlaːʋa]; Italian: Còbbia) is a village west of Štanjel in the Municipality of Komen in the Littoral region of Slovenia next to the border with Italy.

== Name ==
Kobjeglava was attested in written sources in 1300 as Cobila glaua and in 1349 as Cublaglauua. The name is derived from reduction of *Kobilja glava 'mare's head', based on a metaphorical motivation.

== Church ==
The parish church in the settlement is dedicated to Saint Michael and belongs to the Koper Diocese.
