= Videm pri Ptuju =

Videm pri Ptuju Sveti Vid pri Ptuju (until 1952)
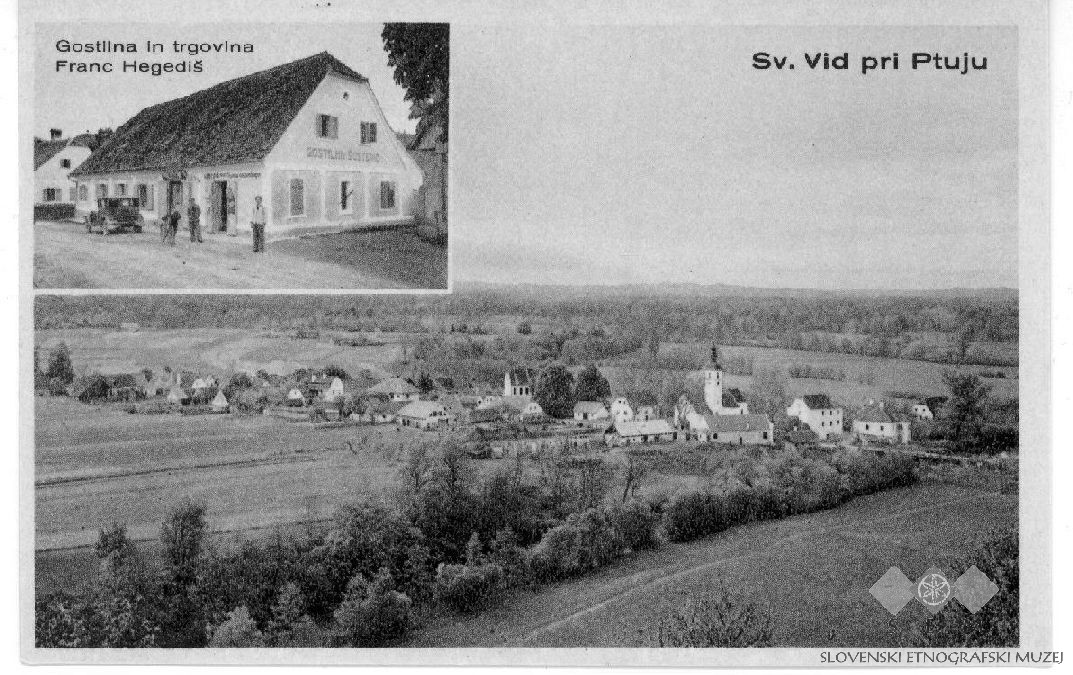
- Postcard of Videm pri Ptuju

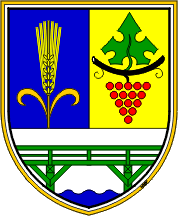
- Coat of arms

- Location in Slovenia
- Coordinates: 46°22′11.62″N 15°53′36.43″E
- Country: Slovenia
- Traditional region: Styria
- Statistical region: Drava
- Municipality: Videm

Area
  - Total: 0.80 km^{2} (0.31 sq mi)

Population (2002)
  - Total: 451

Videm pri Ptuju (pronounced [ˈʋiːdəm pɾi ˈptuːju]) is a settlement in the Municipality of Videm in eastern Slovenia. It is the administrative centre of the municipality. The area is part of the traditional region of Styria. It is now included in the Drava Statistical Region.

== Name ==
The name of the settlement was changed from Sveti Vid pri Ptuju (literally, 'Saint Vitus near Ptuj') to Videm pri Ptuju in 1952. The name was changed on the basis of the 1948 Law on Names of Settlements and Designations of Squares, Streets, and Buildings as part of efforts by Slovenia's postwar communist government to remove religious elements from toponyms.

== Church ==
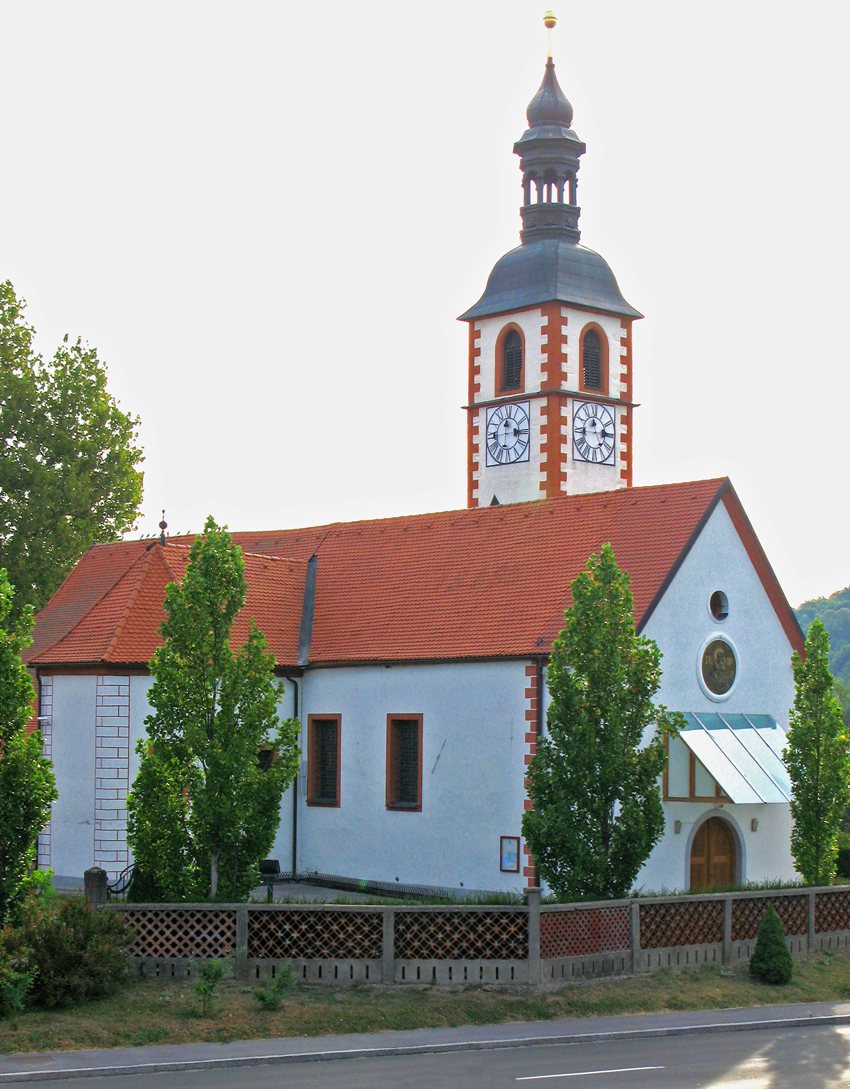
St. Vitus's Parish Church

The parish church, which the village was formerly named after, is dedicated to Saint Vitus. It belongs to the Roman Catholic Archdiocese of Maribor. It was first mentioned in written documents dating to 1320. The current building dates to the mid-15th century with 17th-century Baroque additions.
