= Ledava =

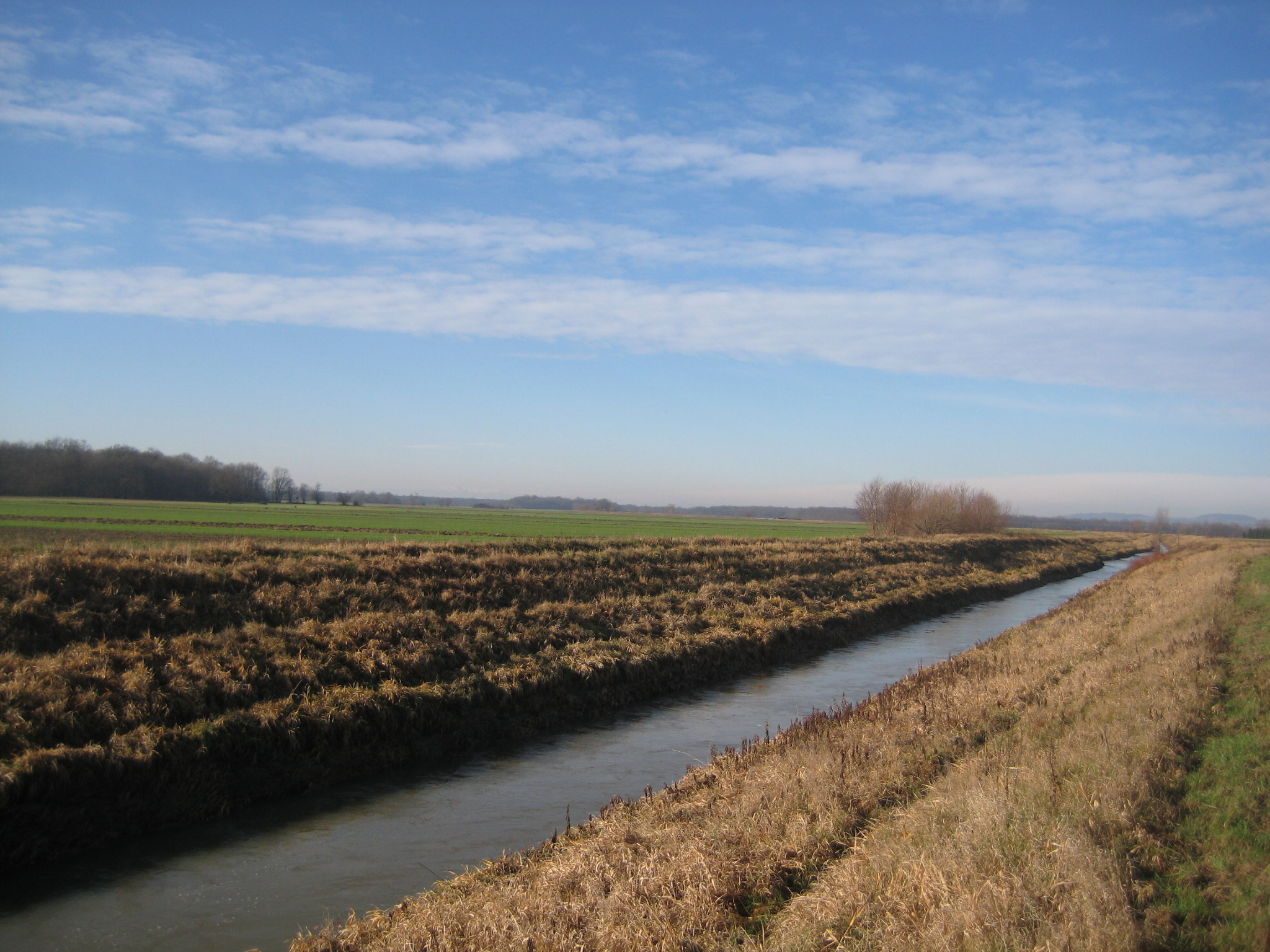
- Ledava near Polana, Slovenia

Location
- Countries: Austria and Slovenia
- State: Styria
- Region: Prekmurje

Physical characteristics
- Mouth
  - location: Mur
  - coordinates: 46°28′08″N 16°36′44″E
- Length: 80.2 km (49.8 mi)

Basin features
- Progression: Mur→ Drava→ Danube→ Black Sea

The Ledava (German: Limbach, Hungarian: Lendva) is a river of Styria, Austria and of Goričko, Prekmurje, northeastern Slovenia.

The Ledava is the largest river of Goričko and the largest tributary of the Mur in Slovenia. It is 80.2 kilometres (49.8 mi) in length. It originates in Austria as the Lendva Bach and first flows southeast. It enters Slovenia near Kugla Hill, the highest peak of Prekmurje (418 metres or 1,371 feet), and flows south as the Ledava. In this part of its course it forms the only gorge in Goričko. In the village of Ropoča, Municipality of Rogašovci, it flows into the Ledava Reservoir, which distinguishes itself by a variety of bird species, a variety of dragonflies, and the best preserved otter population in Slovenia. The Ledava is the only outflow from the lake. In its lower course the river flows through Murska Sobota and Lendava. It has several (mainly left) tributaries in this part, the largest of them being the Kerka and the longest Kobilje Creek. Finally, it joins the Mur next to the Croatian-Hungarian-Slovenian border near Muraszemenye.
