= Starše =

Locality and municipality of Slovenia

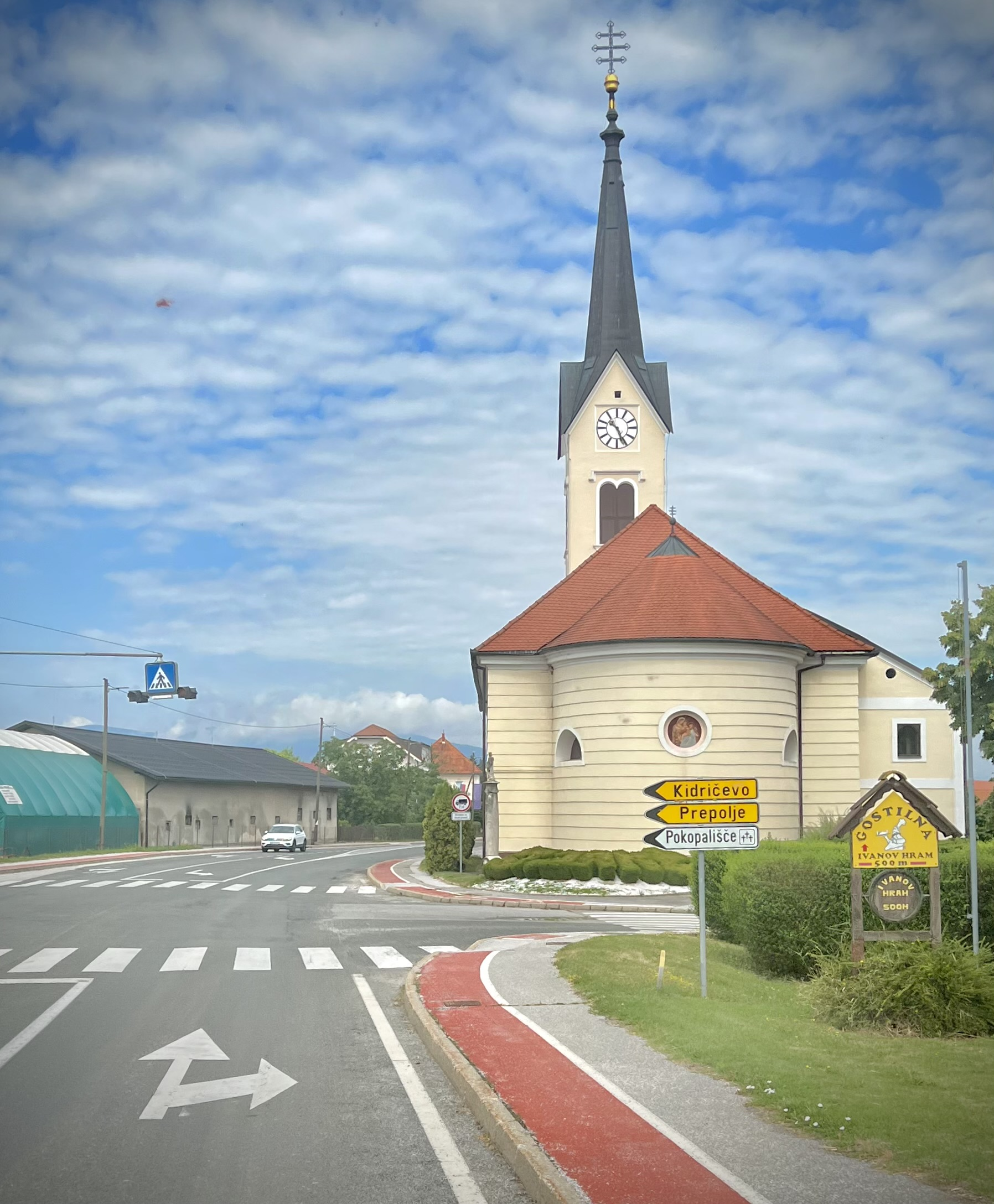

- Location of Starše in Slovenia
- Coordinates: 46°27′59″N 15°46′3″E
- Country: Slovenia
- Traditional region: Styria
- Statistical region: Drava
- Municipality: Starše

Area
  - Total: 4.4 km^{2} (1.7 sq mi)

Population (2015)
  - Total: 757
  - Density: 172/km^{2} (450/sq mi)
- Time zone: UTC+01 (CET)
  - Summer (DST): UTC+02 (CEST)

Starše (pronounced [ˈstaːɾʃɛ]) is a settlement in northeastern Slovenia. It is the administrative seat of the Municipality of Starše. It lies on the right bank of the Drava River southeast of Maribor. The area is part of the traditional region of Styria. It is now included in the Drava Statistical Region.

The parish church in the settlement is dedicated to John the Baptist and belongs to the Roman Catholic Archdiocese of Maribor. It was first mentioned in written documents dating to 1441, but the current structure was built in 1833.
