= Polskava =

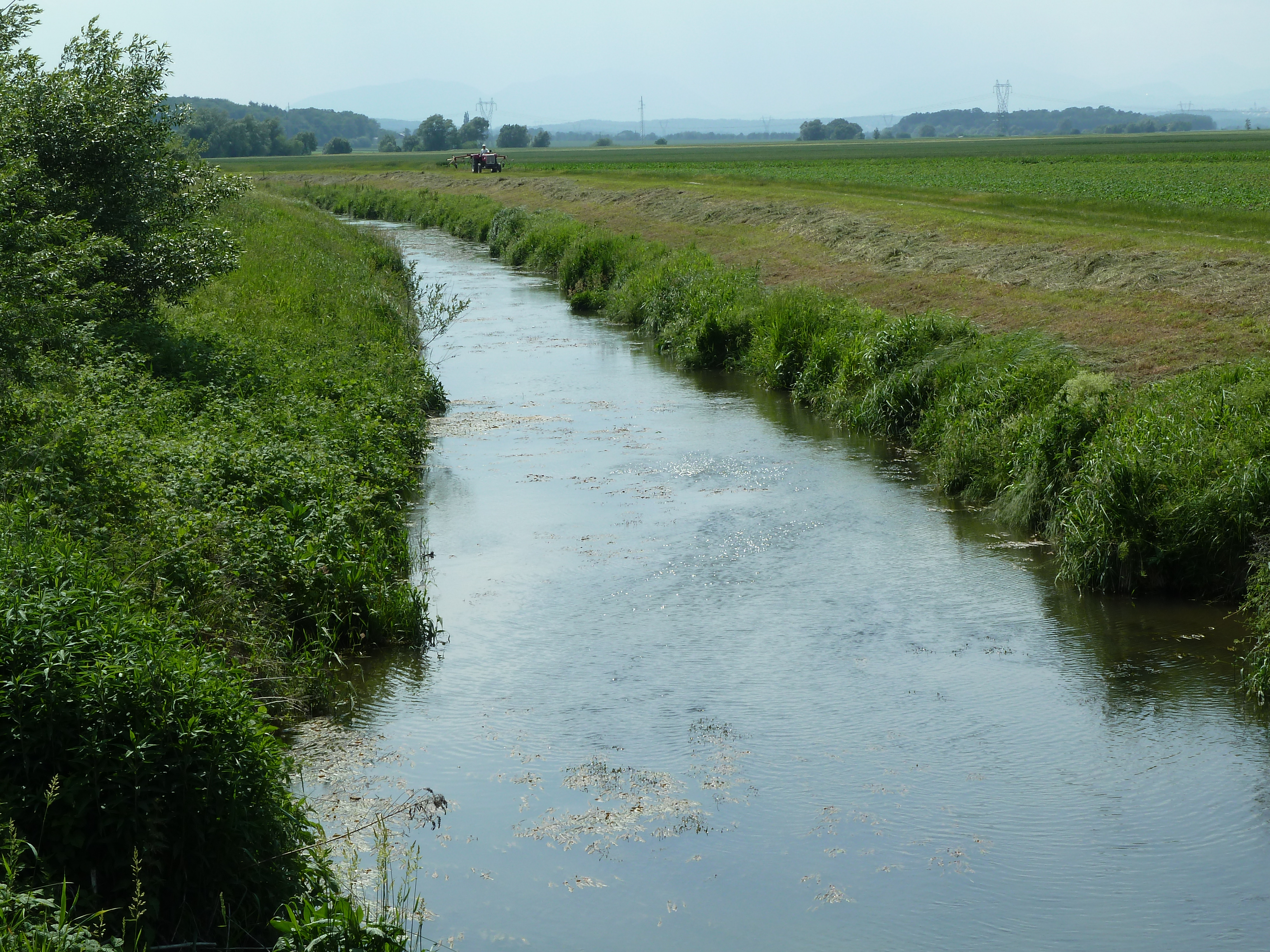

Location
- Country: Slovenia

Physical characteristics
- Mouth
  - location: Dravinja
  - coordinates: 46.3659°N 15.8854°E
- Length: 40 km (25 mi)
- Basin size: 189 km^{2} (73 sq mi)

Basin features
- Progression: Dravinja→ Drava→ Danube→ Black Sea

The Polskava is a river in Styria, Slovenia. The river is 40 kilometres (25 mi) in length. Its source is on the Pohorje Massif, near Saint Henry's Church (Slovene: Sveti Areh) at the Maribor Pohorje Ski Resort. It passes Šmartno na Pohorju, Zgornja Polskava, Spodnja Polskava, Pragersko, and Lovrenc na Dravskem Polju, and merges with the Dravinja River near Videm pri Ptuju.
