= 65th Kurentovanje (2025) =

2025 carnival event in Ptuj, Slovenia

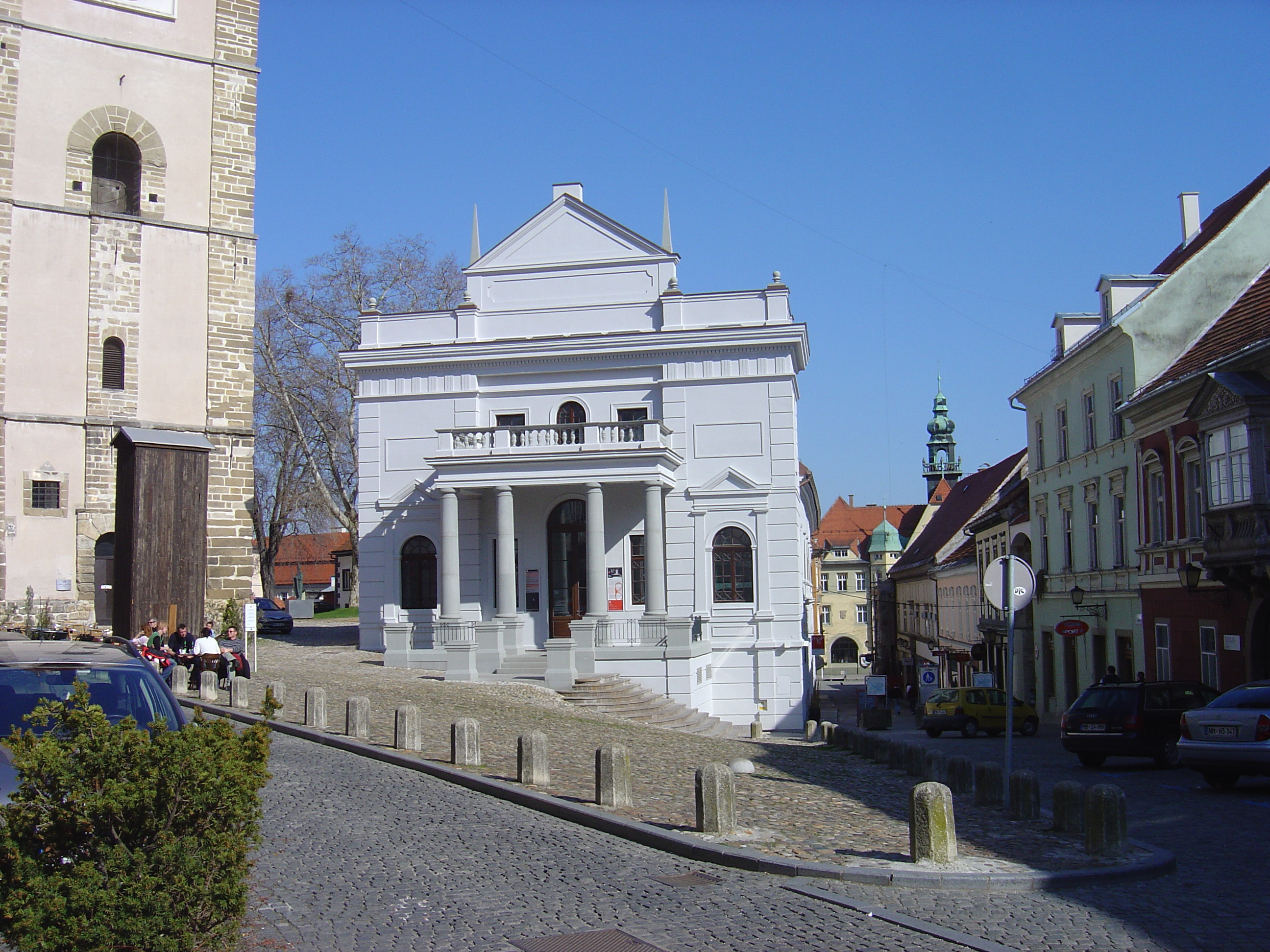
Kurentovanje 2025
"Kurent's House" next to Town Theater (the light greenish building on the far right)
Information
Date:	22 February – 4 March 2025
Location:	Ptuj, Slovenia
Organized by:	Ptuj Public Institute
Edition:	65th
Main character:	Kurent (Korant)
19th carnival prince:	Francesco Guffante, city judge
Honorary patronage
Nataša Pirc Musar (President of Slovenia)
Opening Ethnographic Parade
22 February:	17,000 visitors
International Carnival Parade
2 March:	50,000 visitors
Record: (2011)	65,000 visitors
Awarded carnival groups
1st award:	»Grbci«
2nd award:	»Go-Car-Go! Bo kar bo!«
3rd award:	»Kitajska pomlad Hanov«

Kurentovanje 2025 was the 65th edition of Ptuj carnival organized by Ptuj Public Institute with the Urban Municipality of Ptuj cooperation, held between 22 February and 4 March in Ptuj, Slovenia.

Around 6,800 participants from nine countries are expected at all public events, with 14 foreign groups to be hosted. They also increased the cash fund for carnival groups to €6,300 (4,200 last year).

The President of Slovenia Nataša Pirc Musar was this year's honorary patronage of Kurentovanje.

19th prince of the carnival (the second year in a row), is Francesco Guffante, city judge.

== Schedule ==
=== Introduction ===
Since	Events	Always on the same day	Visit
2001	24th Kurent (Korant) Jump	Midnight ritual by the fire at Zoki's homestead in Budina (Candlemas – 2 to 3 February)	500; Kurents

=== Main traditional events ===
Since	Events	Always on the same day	Visit
↓ Ethnic and carnival parades ↓
1998	28th Opening Ethnographic Parade	pre-Shrove Saturday (22.2.)	17,000
2017	9th Day of Kurent (Korant) Groups	Shrove Wednesday (26.2.)	cancelled
1873	12th Saturday Carnival Promenade	Shrove Saturday (1.3.)	thousands
2013	12th Saturday Carnival Promenade	Shrove Saturday (1.3.)	thousands
2015	10th Night Spectacle	Shrove Saturday (1.3.)	thousands
1960	65th International Carnival Parade	Shrove Sunday (2.3.)	50,000
1960	13th Children's Parade	Shrove Monday (3.3.)	thousands
1960	65th Shrove Tuesday Burial	Shrove Tuesday (4.3.)	thousands

=== Accompanying events ===
Since	Event	Always on the same day	Visit
2006	20th Obarjada	pre-Shrove Saturday (22.2.)	ca. 8,000
2025	1st Kurent Fair	pre-Shrove Saturday (1.3.) pre-Shrove Sunday (2.3.)	thousands

Since	Art events		Always on the same day
2009	17th Ex-Tempore	Art colony	pre-Shrove Saturday (22.2.)
2009	17th Ex-Tempore	Exhibition Opening	Shrove Saturday (1.3.)

=== Evening display of indigenous characters ===
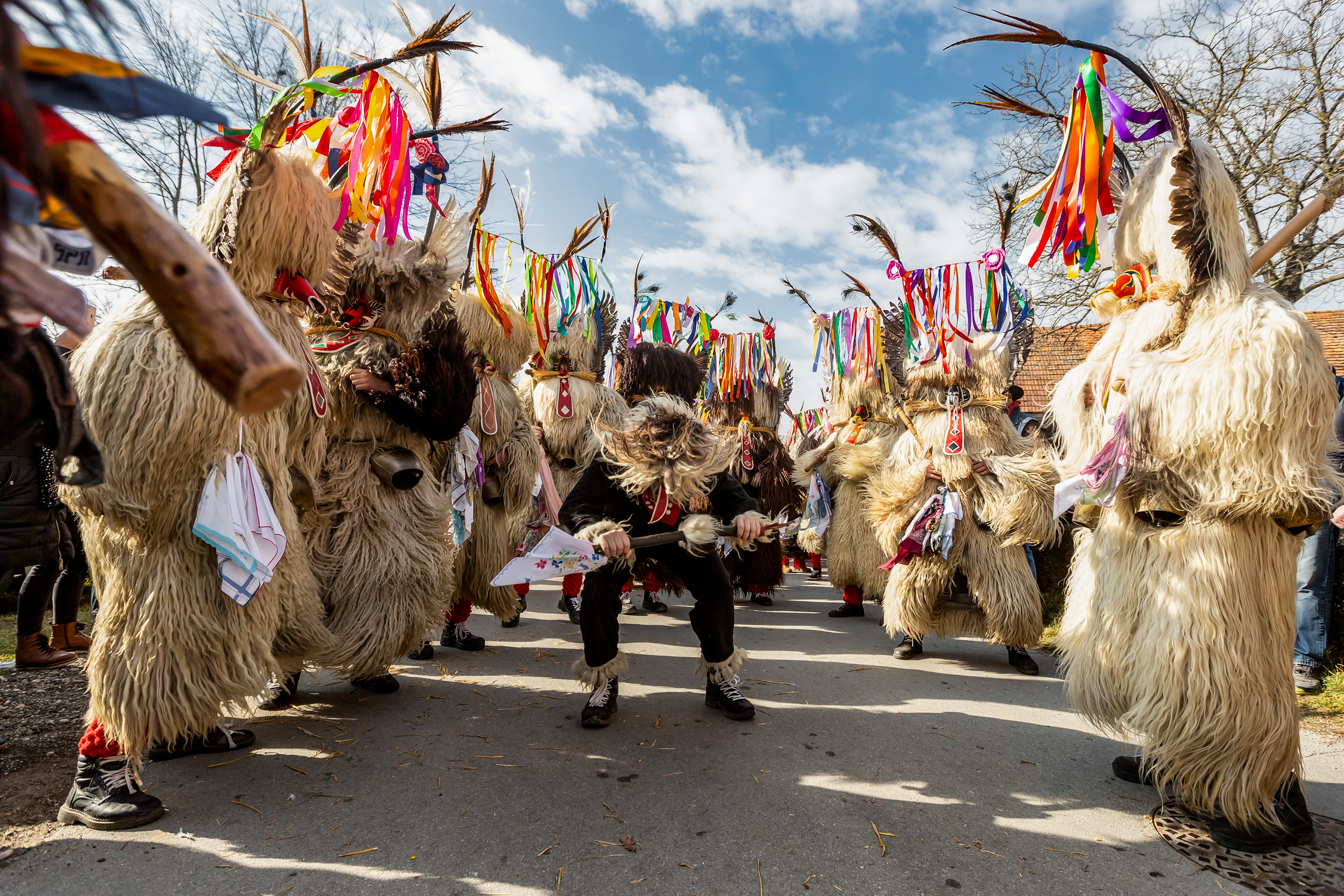
Kurent (Korant), the main figure

Date	Indigenous character(s)	Day
↓ In old town every night at 6:00 pm ↓ (on Shrove Saturday exceptionally at 12:30 PM)
23.2.	The Whip Crackers, Rusas, Kurents (Korants)	pre-Shrove Sunday
24.2.	Ploughmen, Old Woman Carrying Her Man, Kurents (Korants)	pre-Shrove Monday
25.2.	Gypsies, Kurents (Korants)	pre-Shrove Tuesday
27.2.	Spearman, Cockerels, Fairies, Serfs, Bears, Kurents	Shrove Thursday
28.2.	Jürek and Rabolj, Log-Haulers, Kurents (Korants)	Shrove Friday
1.3.	Kurents (Korants)	Shrove Saturday
3.3.	Kurents (Korants)	Shrove Monday

== Main events ==
=== 24th Kurent's jump (2.2.–3.2) ===
Zvonko Križaj (Prince Matevž Zoki II) wanted to revive an old tradition, when his father and neighbors first put on bells at Candlemas at midnight.

It is a ceremonial dance of kurents by the fire, always exactly at midnight on the transition from February 2 to 3, introduced by the 2nd Carnival Prince Matevž Zoki II in 2001, or rather revived an old custom from his home area. Therefore, ever since then, this event has traditionally been held annually on his homestead in Budina, just below Lake Ptuj. It also gathers several hundred kurents and is an introduction (albeit unofficial) to the entire carnival event, as it is a completely independent and separate folk event, not connected to the official carnival. What is characteristic of this event is that the kurents do not wear fur coats and masks, only bells, hedgehogs and leggings. This year, over 500 kurents gathered.

=== 28th Opening Ethnographic Parade (22.2.) ===
The intercontinental meeting of ethnographic carnival characters has been held since 1998, always on the pre-carnival Saturday morning at 11 a.m., as the opening procession of the 11-day carnival event. It features only traditional ethnographic carnival characters from several European countries. In addition to our local characters such as kurents (korants), baba nosi deda, Whip-Crackers, Ploughmen, Cockerels, Bears, ploughmen, Fairies and carnival dancers, there are also traditional carnival schemes from abroad such as Austria, Italy, North Macedonia, Bulgaria, Croatia...

On February 22, at the opening procession, there were total 2,463 performers from total 81 groups from a wide variety of societies from four different countries: Italy, Croatia, Bulgaria and Slovenia. Of these, a record 1,076 kurents (never before in an ethnographic procession) and 967 ethnographic masks from Ptuj and Drava fields, 303 masks from other parts of Slovenia and 157 masks from abroad. The ethnographic procession was also visited by a record 17,000 people from near and far, a good number of people from abroad as well. For the second year in a row, the 19th Carnival Prince Francesco Guffante, Ptuj city judge, "took over" power for 11 days.

- 1. Ptuj Brass Orchestra
- 2. The 19th Prince of the Carnival
  (Francesco Guffante, city judge)
- 3. The Prince's Merchants
- 4. Kurents and Korants
- 5. Whip-Crackers (Župečja vas, Tržec, Pobrežje)
- 6. Spearmen (Markovci)
- 7. Fairies (Markovci)
- 8. Cockerels (KUD Baron Muretinci)
- 9. Jürek and Rabolj (Dolena)
- 10. Bears (Markovci)
- 11. Cirkovce Log-Haulers (Cirkovce)
- 12. Pobrežje Dancers (Pobrežje)
- 13. The Old Woman Carrying The Old Man (Soviče-Dravci)
- 14. Ploughmen (Leskovec, Podlehnik, Podvinci, Mali Okič, Markovci, Rogoznica, Kicar)
- 15. Miners (Sodinci)
- 16. Serfs (Spuhlja)
- 17. Herbalists (Draženci)
- 18. Škoromats (Hrušica, Ilirska Bistrica)
- 19. Šjme Vrbovo (Vrbovo)
- 20. Liški pustje (Kanal ob Soči)
- 21. Sevski potecini (Selšček)
- 22. Obrški prutarji (Veliki Obrež)
- 23. Butalci (Cerknica)
- 24. Koši Šoštanjski (Šoštanj)
- 25. Pust Mozirski (Mozirje)
- 26. Krampusi Ankestein (Cirkulane)
- 27. Kungoški parklji (Kungota)
- 28. Coprnice izpod Resenika (Žetale)
- 29. (Croatia) Baranjske buše (Draž)
- 30. (Croatia) Brežanski zvončari (Matulji)
- 31. (Croatia) Srakarski zvončari (Sračinec)
- 32. (Croatia) Lafre, pikači, čaplje in cimeri (Čakovec)
- 33. (Italy) Urthos E Buttudos (Sardinia)
- 34. (Bulgaria) Survakari-Kukeri (Sofia)
- 35. Gypsies (TED Lükari in ED Cigani Dornava)

OPENING ETHNOGRAPHIC PARADE STATISTICS;

- 2.463 participants (from 81 groups in total)
- 1.076 kurents (from 38 groups of kurents and korants)
- 927 participants (from 26 local ethnographic groups from Ptuj area)
- 303 participants (from 11 other ethnographic groups from other parts of Slovenia)
- 157 participants (from 6 foreign ethnographic groups from Croatia, Italy and Bulgaria)

=== 20th Obarjada (22.2.) ===
Since 2006, on pre-Shrove Saturday, together with opening ethnographic parade, in Novi trg square (formerly in the courtyard of Ptuj Cellar, Minorite Monastery and Mestna tržnica), a charity chicken stew "Obarjada" is held, where Obara is cooked, organised by the Lions Club. The proceeds from the sale of sold stoves go exclusively to charity, originally intended mainly for the blind and visually impaired. The record is 8,000 people.

The 20th Obarjada took place under the title "More than soup". A record 24 teams cooked and collected a record 39,420 euros, of which 20,300 euros were contributed by the visitors (about the same as last year) and the rest by various donors. They cooked approximately 6,000 servings of stew.

=== 9th Day of Kurent and Korant groups (26.2.) ===
The Day of Kurent's (Korant's) groups is a relative novelty. It has been held since 2017, originally held on pre-Shrove Tuesday and moved to Shrove Wednesday, is organized by the Association of Kurent Societies. It is exclusively an evening performance of the kurents and korants, when hundreds of them gather in the old town. This year the event was canceled a day earlier due to rain forecast and was not rescheduled.

=== 12th Saturday Carnival Promenade (1.3.) ===
The Saturday carnival promenade has been held annually since 2013 on Shrove Saturday, as it was revived after a long time on the 140th anniversary of the first recorded Ptuj city corso from 1873. It features Romans, medieval merchants and townspeople in carnival costumes.

=== 10th Night Spectacle (1.3.) ===
It has been held since 2015, this year on Carnival Saturday, where only demonic masks such as Krampus, devils, hooves, zombies...

=== 65th International Carnival Parade (2.3.) ===
It is the highlight each year, which takes place on Shrove Sunday afternoon. It features several thousand ethnographic and other carnival masks, both domestic and numerous schemes from other European countries, the best masks are also awarded. It attracts an average of 50,000 visitors from all over Slovenia, as well as from abroad. It is one of the largest and most important processions in Europe and the world. In 2011, record 65,000 people gathered at the main international Sunday event, an absolute record that has not been surpassed to this day.

On March 2, on Carnival Sunday, the procession began at 1 p.m. at the Fire Station and ended at 4 p.m. at the MIhelič Gallery, and was attended by 50,000 people, including many foreign visitors. A total of 2,248 participants from 81 groups participated in the procession. This year's honorary patron, the President of Slovenia Nataša Pirc Musar and the Speaker of the National Assembly Urška Klakočar Zupančič, visited the event.

ETHNOGRAPHIC;

- 1. Ptuj Brass Orchestra
- 2. The 19th Prince of the Carnival
  (Francesco Guffante, city judge)
- 3. The Prince's Merchants
- 4. Kurents and Korants
- 5. Whip-Crackers (Pobrežje)
- 6. Spearmen (Markovci)
- 7. Fairies (Markovci)
- 8. Jürek and Rabolj (Dolena)
- 9. Whip-Crackers (Tržec)
- 10. Pobrežje Dancers (Cirkovce)
- 11. Cockerels (Nova vas pri Markovcih)
- 12. Whip-Crackers (Župečja vas)
- 13. Serfs (Spuhlja)
- 14. Ploughmen (Podvinci, Lancova vas, Podlehnik Leskovec, Dornava, Kicar)
- 15. Ruse (Ruse Center)
- 16. Gypsies (TED Lükari and ED Cigani Dornava)
- 17. (Bulgaria) Cheeses (Pernik)
- 18. (Belgium) Wild Boars (Arlon)
- 19. (Bosnia and Herzegovina) Witches (Banja Luka)
- 20. (Slovakia) Sitnan (Banská Štiavnica)
- 21. (Austria) Krampusi (Eggersdorf)
- 22. (France) Mülhüser Waggis (Mulhouse)

CARNIVAL;

- 23. Bavarians-Oktoberfest (Markovci Brass Orchestra)
- 24. Merry Clowns
- 25. Hüjdi vragi
- 26. Lect's Hearts (Meglič, Mladika, Breg, Ljudski Vrt, Pivka)
- 27. Land of Mushrooms (Carnival group Bukovci-Vopošnica)
- 28. The Flinstones (Sport Society Moškanjci)
- 29. Kitajska pomlad Hanov (Kocil Society)
- 30. Frogs (KUD Maska Stojnci)
- 31. Old China (Fašenk group Separji)
- 32. Texas Show (Youth Bukovci)
- 33. Dwarfs and Snow White from Haloze Cavesǃ (KTD Klopotec)
- 34. Go – Car – Go! Bo kar bo! (Ptuj Engineering Highschool)
- 35. Lintvorts (TED Sodinci)
- 36. Grbci (KUD Vetrnice)
- 37. Who Is There Singing (Fašenk group Moškanjci)
- 38. Astrodravci (Youth Dravsko polje)
- 39. Medo nosi (Dornava)

INTERNATIONAL CARNIVAL PARADE STATISTICS;

- 3.248 participants (from 81 groups in total)
- 1.116 participants (from 41 groups of kurents and korants)
- 956 participants (from 21 local and foreign ethnographic groups)
- 1065 participants (from 17 carnival groups and societies from around the Ptuj)
- 761 participants (from 13 carnival groups in competition)
- 111 participants (from 5 foreign ethnographic groups from Austria, Bulgaria, France, Belgium and Slovakia)

=== 13th Children's Parade (3.3.) ===
On 3 March, on Shrove Monday, at 10 a.m., there was the 13th edition of Children's parade at the old town, a parade of kindergartens from all over Slovenia, the biggest procession of this kind in Slovenia. It took place through the streets of old city center, in which 1,200 costumed children from different age groups performed. In the afternoon, the children's masquerade moved to the Campus carnival hall.

=== 65th Shrove Tuesday Burial (4.3.) ===
In Ptuj, the farewell from the carnival season is especially festive. People stop working there at noon and meet at numerous parties in the old town that last into late night. On March 4, on Shrove Tuesday at 1 p.m., this year's carnival was buried in front of the city hall, with the carnival being sentenced to death in a court trial and later burned. The mayor Nuška Gajšek received the keys to the city gates from the 19th prince of the carnival, Francesco Guffante (Marko Šamperl), and took power again. The party continued at 5 different venues with a variety of music (entertainment).

== Carnival hall ==
Between 7 February and 1 March 2025 commercial part of the carnival with different, mostly music events, but also traditional student and children parade, is being held in Arena Campus Sava Ptuj carnival hall (separated from ethnographic and carnival parades).

=== Arena Campus Sava Ptuj ===
Date	Artist(s)	Day
7.2.	↓ OPENING CONCERT (at 9 PM) ↓	Friday
7.2.	Dubioza kolektiv and Emkej	Friday
15.2.	↓ at 9 PM ↓	Saturday
15.2.	Severina and Grupa Vigor	Saturday
21.2.	↓ PRE-SHROVE FRIDAY (at 9 PM) ↓	pre-shrove Friday
21.2.	Željko Bebek, Neda Ukraden and Rockmantika	pre-shrove Friday
22.2.	↓ PRE-SHROVE SATURDAY (at 9 PM) ↓	pre-shrove Saturday
22.2.	DJ Umek	pre-shrove Saturday
26.2.	↓ POLI PARTY 2025 (from 5 PM to 8 PM) ↓	shrove Wednesday
26.2.	Čuki and Ribič Pepe	shrove Wednesday
28.2.	↓ KURENTANC (at 9 PM) ↓	shrove Friday
28.2.	Prljavo kazalište, Leteči odred and Čuki	shrove Friday
1.3.	↓ SHROVE SATURDAY (at 9 PM) ↓	shrove Saturday
1.3.	Vlado Kreslin, Mambo Kings and Buryana	shrove Saturday
3.3.	↓ CHILDREN PARADE (at 4 PM) ↓	shrove Monday
3.3.	Alenka Kolman and Klovni DPM Ptuj	shrove Monday

== Sponsors ==
Ptuj carnival Kurentovanje is under the patronage of UNESCO intangible cultural heritage.

=== Main organisers and co-participants ===
- Public Institute Ptuj
- Urban Municipality of Ptuj
- Javne službe Ptuj
- FECC
- Association of Kurent Societies
- Council of carnival princes
- I Feel Slovenia

=== Partners ===
- Adriaplin
- NLB Skupina
- Perutnina Ptuj
- Talum
- Javne službe Ptuj
- Zavarovalnica Triglav
- Cestno podjetje Ptuj
- Dravske elektrarne Maribor (DEM)
- Sava Hotels & Resorts
- Ptujske pekarne
- Ptujska klet
- Intera
- Casino Admiral Ptuj
- Reseda
- Tenzor
- Telekom Slovenije
- Petrol
- McDonald's
- PSS Ptuj d.o.o.
- Geoplin Petrol
- Telemach
- Jager
- Gostilna Ribič
- IVD
- Komunala Ptuj
- Drava d.o.o.

== Awards ==
=== Carnival groups ===
Tptal prize money is 6,300 euros.

	Participants	Prize
1. nagrada	»Grbci« (KUD Vetrnice)	2,000 euros
2. nagrada	»Go-Car-Go! Bo kar bo!« (Strojna šola Ptuj)	1,700 euros
3. nagrada	»Kitajska pomlad Hanov« (Društvo Kocil)	1,500 euros
the rest of 11 groups will each get 100 euros

== Indigenous characters ==
Indigenous characters (masks) from Ptuj wider area including Ptuj field, Drava field and from Haloze:

- "Kurent" or "Korant" (the main character)
- "The Whip Crackers" (for happiness and well-being)
- "Carnival dancers" (from Pobrežje, Videm)
- "the Spearman" (marital character)
- "Ploughmen" (draw a magic circle)
- "Log-Haulers" (to enchant fertility)
- "The Devil" (fear, fear, is coming)
- "The Trough" (the straw bride)
- "Old Woman Carrying Her Man" (spirits of heaven)
- "The Mischievous Bear" (from Ptuj field)
- "Kurike and Piceki" (for a good harvest)
- "Jürek and Rabolj" (from Haloze)
- "Fairies" (Zabovci)
- "Rusas" (from Ptuj field)
- "Gypsis" (from Dornava)

== 1st Kurent Fair. Newǃ (Shrove weekend) ==
This year's novelty is the "Kurent's Fair", which will be held during Shrove Saturday and Sunday (March 1 and 2) at the market square from 10 a.m. on. There will be a rich entertainment and animation program. A corner where you can enjoy the flavors of culinary delights including famous Ptuj donats, find souvenirs from the Kurentovanje festival, experience a great atmosphere with a DJ, and have fun on a bouncy house with the little ones.

- Music animation with DJ
- Souvenirs from Kurentovanje
- flavors of culinary delights with Ptuj donats
- Playground for the youngest with bouncy house and animation

– 1 March (from 2 to 5 PM)
– 2 March (from 4 to 6 PM)

== 19th Prince of the carnival ==
Francesco Guffante, city judge (Marko Šamperl), the 19th official prince of Ptuj carnival with two-year mandate (2024–2025), was by the tradition inaugurated on St. Martin's Day (2023) at 11.11 AM. For the second year in a row he took over the keys of the city hall from the mayor Nuška Gajšek at the carnival opening (22.2.) to "rule" the town for 11 days. He will give the keys back at the Burial of the Carnival on Shrove Tuesday.

== Route ==
=== Opening Ethnographic Parade (22.2.) ===
- Zadružni trg (start) – Pešmost – Cankarjeva – Prešernova – Slovenski trg – Slomškova – Miklošičeva – Mestni trg – Krempljeva – Minoritski trg – Dravska – Mihelič gallery (finish)

=== Day of Kurent and Korant Groups (26.2.) ===
- Kurent House (start) – Murkova – Mestni trg – Miklošičeva – Slomškova – Slovenski trg – Prešernova – Kurent House (finish)

=== Saturday Carnival Promenade (1.3.) ===
- Mestni trg (start) – Miklošičeva – Slomškova – Slovenski trg – Murkova – Mestni trg (finish)

=== International Carnival Parade (2.3.) ===
- Potrčeva (start) – Trstenjakova – Vinarski trg – Lackova – Mestni trg – Krempljeva – Minoritski trg – Dravska – Mihelič gallery (finish)

=== Children's Parade (3.3.) ===
- Muzejski trg (start) – Prešernova – Slovenski trg – Murkova – Mestni trg – Krempljeva – Minoritski trg – Dravska – Mihelič gallery (finish)

== Nearby parades ==
=== Around Ptuj ===
Edition	Parade	Day	Since
32	Markovci	shrove Saturday	1992
33	Cirkovci	shrove Tuesday	1993
30	Cirkulane	shrove Saturday	1994
28	Videm pri Ptuju	shrove Monday	1996
24	Majšperk	shrove Saturday	2000
