= 63rd Kurentovanje (2023) =

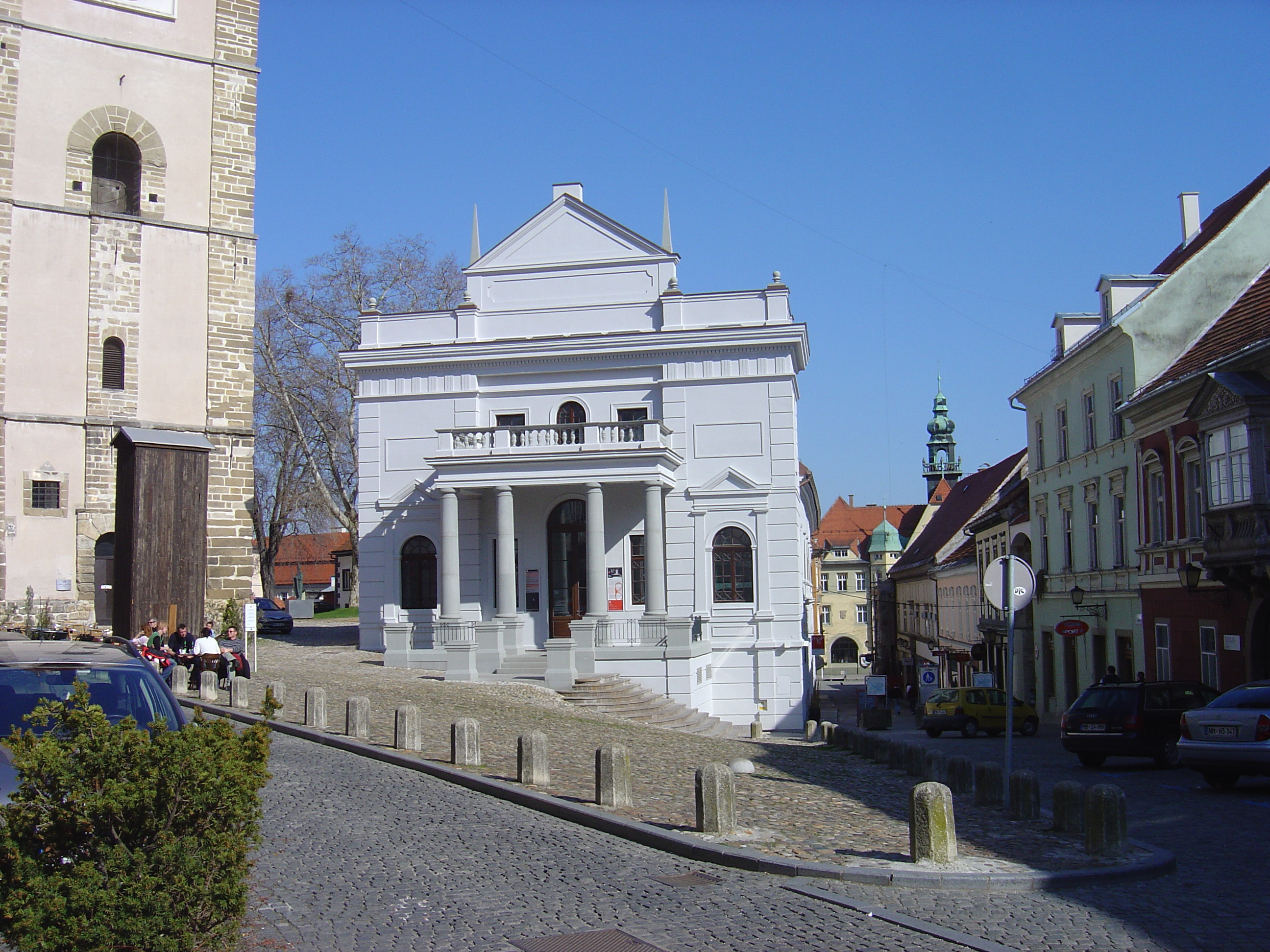
Kurentovanje 2023
Newǃ "Kurent's House" next to Town Theater (the light greenish building on the far right)
Information
Date:	11–21 February 2023
Location:	Ptuj, Slovenia
Organized by:	Ptuj Tourism Public Institute
Edition:	63rd
Main character:	Kurent (Korant)
18th carnival prince:	knight Hinko Sodinski
International Carnival Parade
Record: (2011)	65.000 visitors
Current: (2023)

Kurentovanje 2023 was the 63rd Ptuj carnival, organized by Ptuj Tourism Public Institute.

After two years of the pandemic and virtual events and self-initiated and organized processions and parades around the old city center, the carnival is back in full range, without restrictions and officially organized. This year's addition is the opening of Kurent's house in the old town.

== Schedule ==
Every night between 12 and 20 February, Kurents (Korants) will perform at 6 pm local.

=== Introduction ===
Since	Events	Always on the same day	Visit
2001	23rd Kurent (Korant) Jump	Midnight ritual by the fire at Zoki's homestead in Budina (Candlemas – 2 to 3 February)	500; Kurents

=== Main traditional events ===
Since	Events	Always on the same day	Visit
↓ Ethnic and carnival parades ↓
1998	26th Opening Ethnic Procession	Saturday (11.2.)	15,000
2017	7th Day of Kurent (Korant) Groups	Wednesday (15.2.)	800; Kurents
2015	9th Night Spectacle	Shrove Friday (17.2.)	
1873	11th City Carnival Promenade	Shrove Saturday (18.2.)	
2013	11th City Carnival Promenade	Shrove Saturday (18.2.)	
1960	63rd International Carnival Parade	Shrove Sunday (19.2.)	
1960	63rd Slovenian Kindergartens Parade	Shrove Monday (20.2.)	
1960	63rd Burial Shrove	Shrove Tuesday (21.2.)	

=== Accompanying events ===
Since	Charity cooking event	Always on the same day	Visit
2006	18th Obarjada	pre-Shrove Saturday (11.2.)	8,000

Since	Art events		Always on the same day
2009	15th Ex-Tempore	Art colony	pre-Shrove Saturday (11.2.)
2009	15th Ex-Tempore	Exhibition Opening	Shrove Saturday (18.2.)

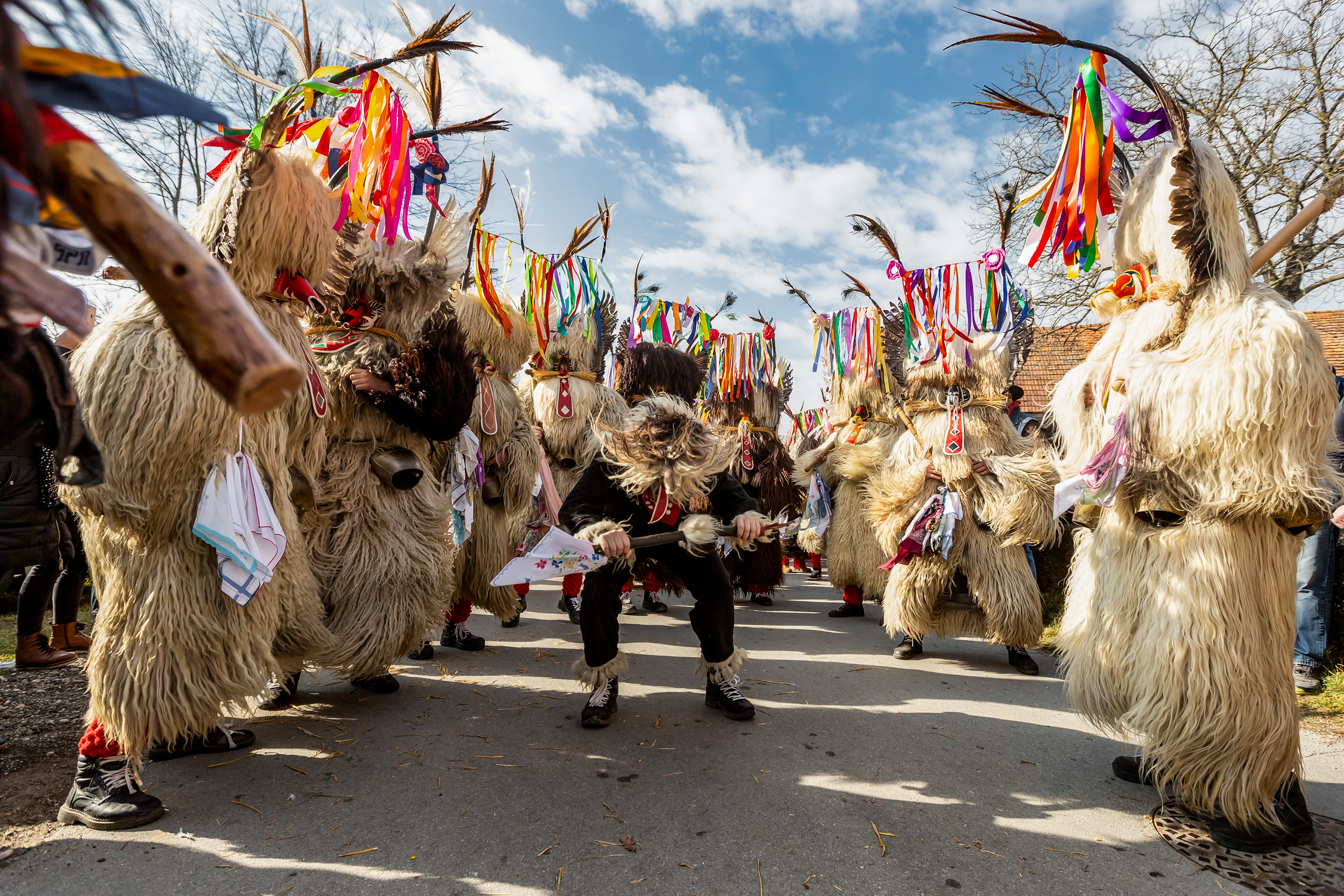
Kurent (Korant), the main figure

=== Evening display of indigenous characters ===
Date	Indigenous character(s)	Day
↓ In old town from 5:00 – 8:00 pm ↓
12th	The Whip Crackers, Rusas	pre-Shrove Sunday
13th	Ploughmen, Old Woman Carrying Her Man	pre-Shrove Monday
14th	Gypsies, Jürek and Rabolj, Log-Haulers	pre-Shrove Tuesday
16th	the Spearman, Kurike and Piceki, Fairies, The Mischievous Bear	Shrove Thursday
20th	Kurent (Korant)	Shrove Monday

=== Music entertainment ===
From 3–19 February 2023, various music acts will perform at Kampus Hall, a commercial part completely separated from the carnival.

== Indigenous characters ==
Indigenous characters (masks) from Ptuj wider area including Ptuj field, Drava field and from Haloze:

- "Kurent" or "Korant" (the main character)
- "The Whip Crackers" (for happiness and well-being)
- "Carnival dancers" (from Pobrežje, Videm)
- "the Spearman" (marital character)
- "Ploughmen" (draw a magic circle)
- "Log-Haulers" (to enchant fertility)
- "The Devil" (fear, fear, is coming)
- "The Trough" (the straw bride)
- "Old Woman Carrying Her Man" (spirits of heaven)
- "The Mischievous Bear" (from Ptuj field)
- "Kurike and Piceki" (for a good harvest)
- "Jürek and Rabolj" (from Haloze)
- "Fairies" (Zabovci)
- "Rusas" (from Ptuj field)
- "Gypsis" (from Dornava)

== Prince of the carnival ==
Knight Hinko Sodinski, noble Gall, will take over the keys of the city hall from the mayor at the carnival opening (11.2.) to "rule" the town for 11 days.

== New! Kurent's House ==
The "Association of Kurent Clubs" opened Kurent's House on February 3, 2023. It is located on Murko Street in the old town center, right across from the famous Ptuj Town Theater. This house shows how important Kurent (Korant) is in history and how well-deserved his place is there. It is the result of the work of 25 different Kurent groups (with a total of 1,100 members) to keep the Kurent (Korant) traditions and ceremonies alive.
