= Urban Municipality of Ptuj =

Urban municipality of Slovenia

Urban Municipality of Ptuj Mestna občina Ptuj
- Municipality
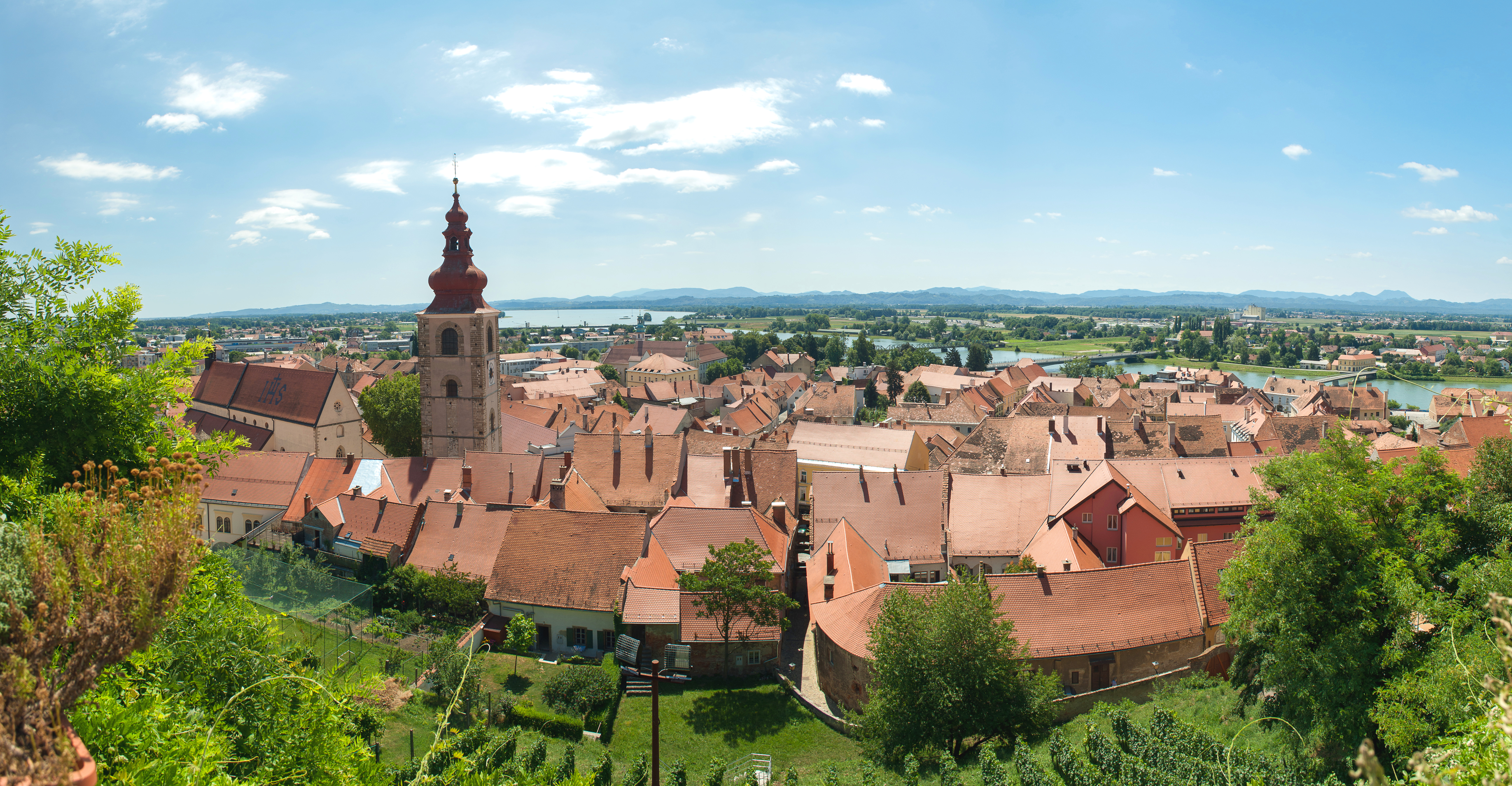

- Coat of arms

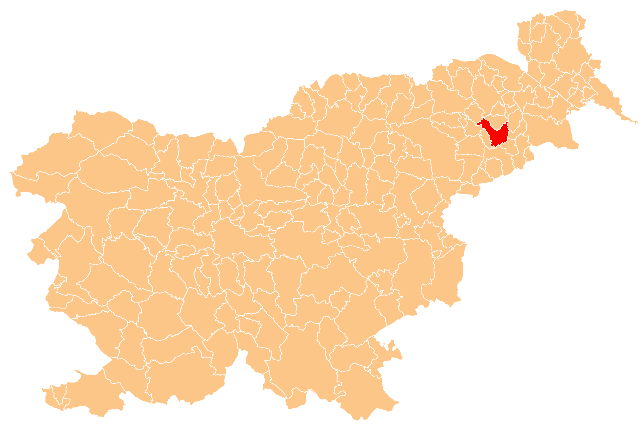
- Location of the Urban Municipality of Ptuj in Slovenia
- Coordinates: 46°25′N 15°52′E
- Country: Slovenia

Government
  - Mayor: Nuška Gajšek (SD)

Area
  - Total: 67 km^{2} (26 sq mi)

Population (2023)
  - Total: 23,525
  - Density: 350/km^{2} (910/sq mi)
- Time zone: UTC+01 (CET)
  - Summer (DST): UTC+02 (CEST)
- Website: www.ptuj.si

The Urban Municipality of Ptuj (pronounced [ˈptuːi̯]; Slovene: Mestna občina Ptuj) is a municipality in northeastern Slovenia. The seat of the municipality is the town of Ptuj. The area is part of the traditional Styria region. The entire municipality is now included in the Drava Statistical Region. The population of the municipality is about 23,500 as of 2023.

== Settlements ==
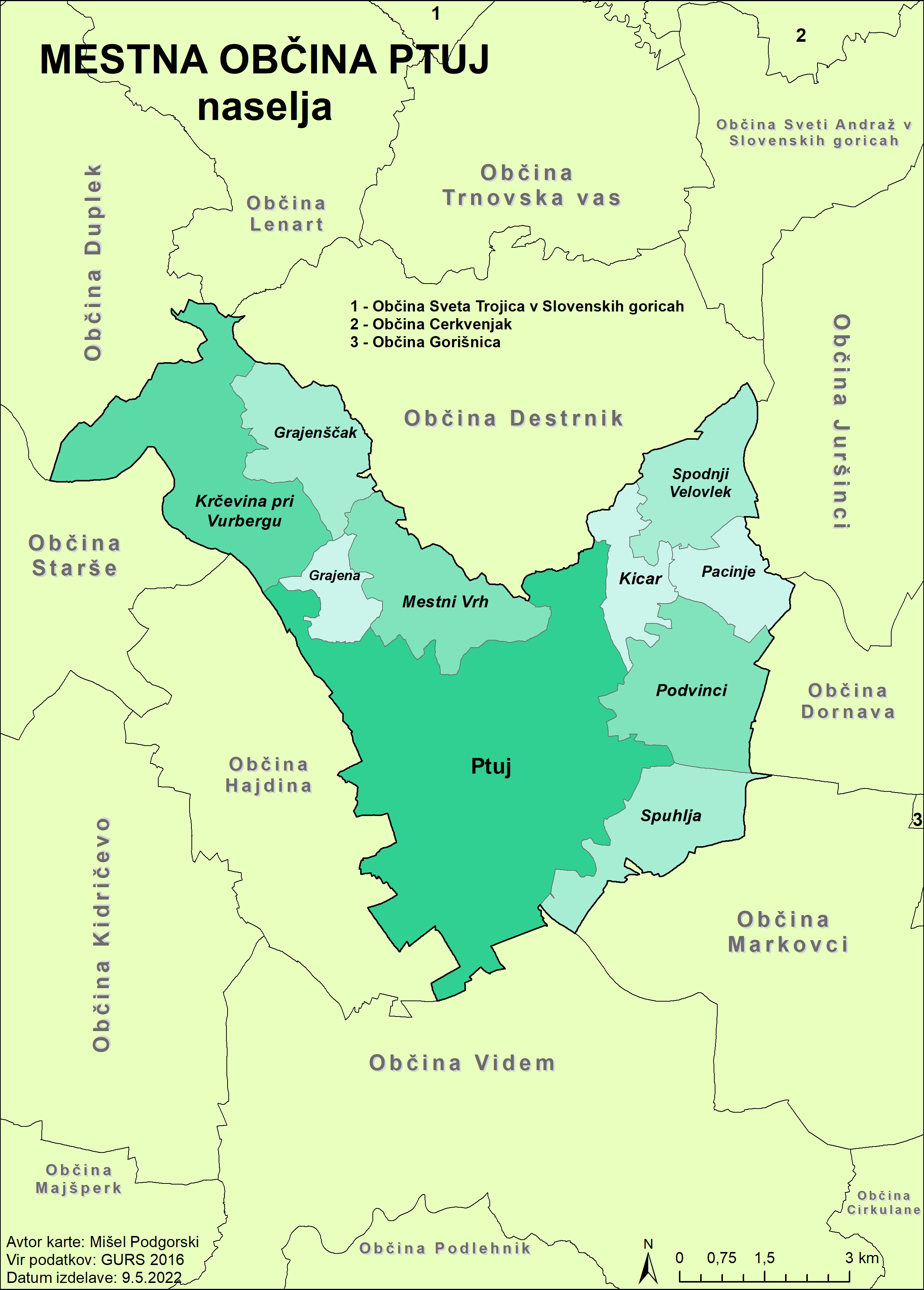
Villages in the municipality

In addition to the municipal seat of Ptuj, the municipality also includes the following settlements:

- Grajena
- Grajenščak
- Kicar
- Krčevina pri Vurbergu
- Mestni Vrh
- Pacinje
- Podvinci
- Spodnji Velovlek
- Spuhlja
