= 64th Kurentovanje (2024) =

2024 carnival event in Ptuj, Slovenia

Kurentovanje 2024
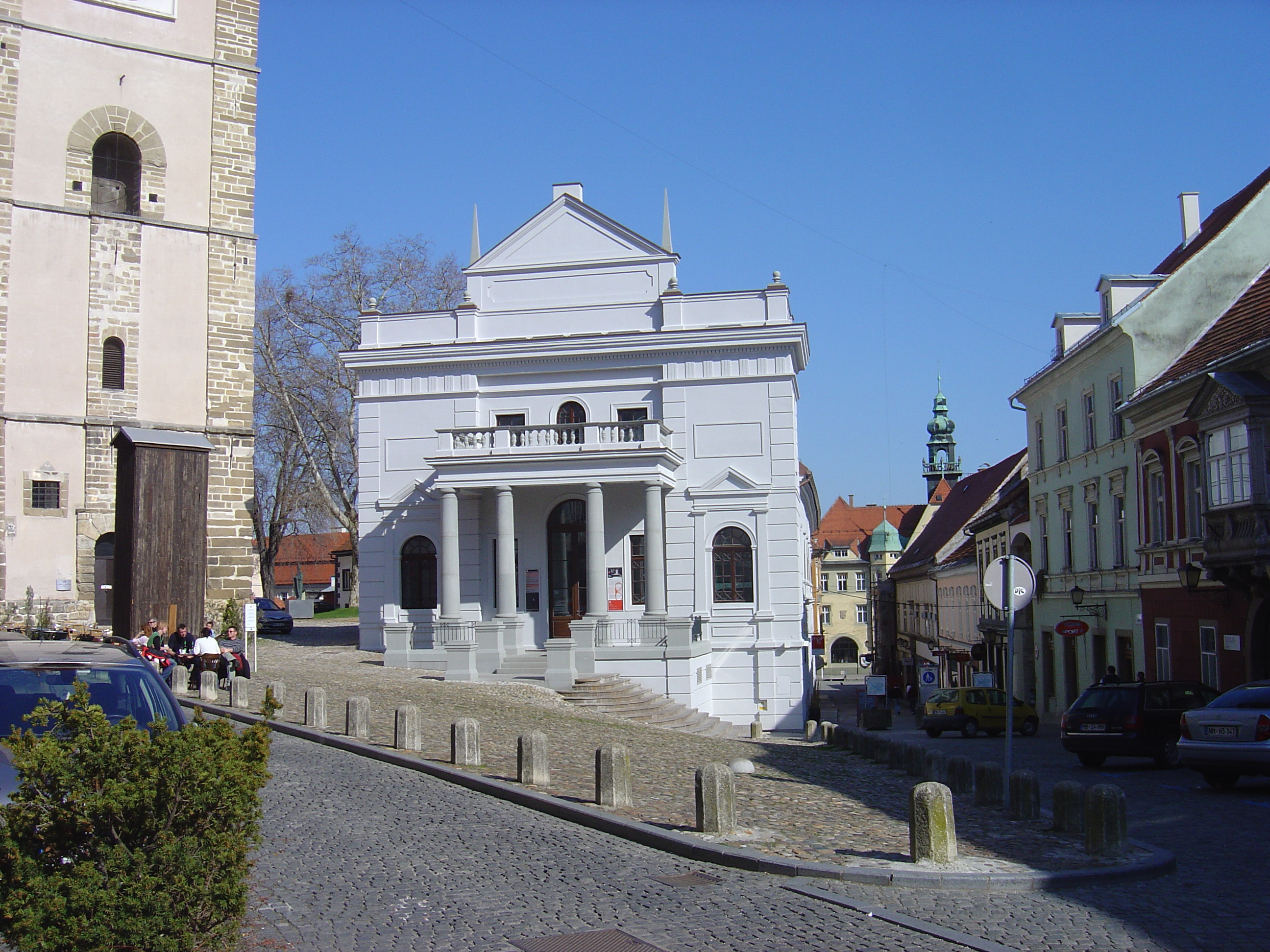
- Kurent's House next to Town Theater (the light greenish building on the far right)
- Date: February 3–13, 2024
- Location: Ptuj, Slovenia
- Organised by: Ptuj Tourism Public Institute

Kurentovanje 2024 was the 64th Ptuj carnival, organized by Ptuj Tourism Public Institute.

== Schedule ==
Every night between 4 and 12 February, Kurents (Korants) will perform at 6 pm local.

=== Introduction ===
Since	Events	Always on the same day	Visit
2001	23rd Kurent (Korant) Jump	Midnight ritual by the fire at Zoki's homestead in Budina (Candlemas – 2 to 3 February)	+1,000; Kurents

=== Main traditional events ===
Since	Events	Always on the same day	Visit
↓ Ethnic and carnival parades ↓
1998	27th Opening Ethnic Procession	Saturday (3.2.)	15,000
2017	8th Day of Kurent (Korant) Groups	Wednesday (7.2.)	
2015	10th Night Spectacle	Shrove Friday (10.2.)	
1873	12th City Carnival Promenade	Shrove Saturday (11.2.)	
2013	12th City Carnival Promenade	Shrove Saturday (11.2.)	
1960	64th International Carnival Parade	Shrove Sunday (11.2.)	
1960	64th Slovenian Kindergartens Parade	Shrove Monday (12.2.)	
1960	64th Burial Shrove	Shrove Tuesday (13.2.)	

=== Accompanying events ===
Since	Charity cooking event	Always on the same day	Visit
2006	19th Obarjada	pre-Shrove Saturday (3.2.)	8,000

Since	Art events		Always on the same day
2009	16th Ex-Tempore	Art colony	pre-Shrove Saturday (3.2.)
2009	16th Ex-Tempore	Exhibition Opening	Shrove Saturday (10.2.)

=== Evening display of indigenous characters ===
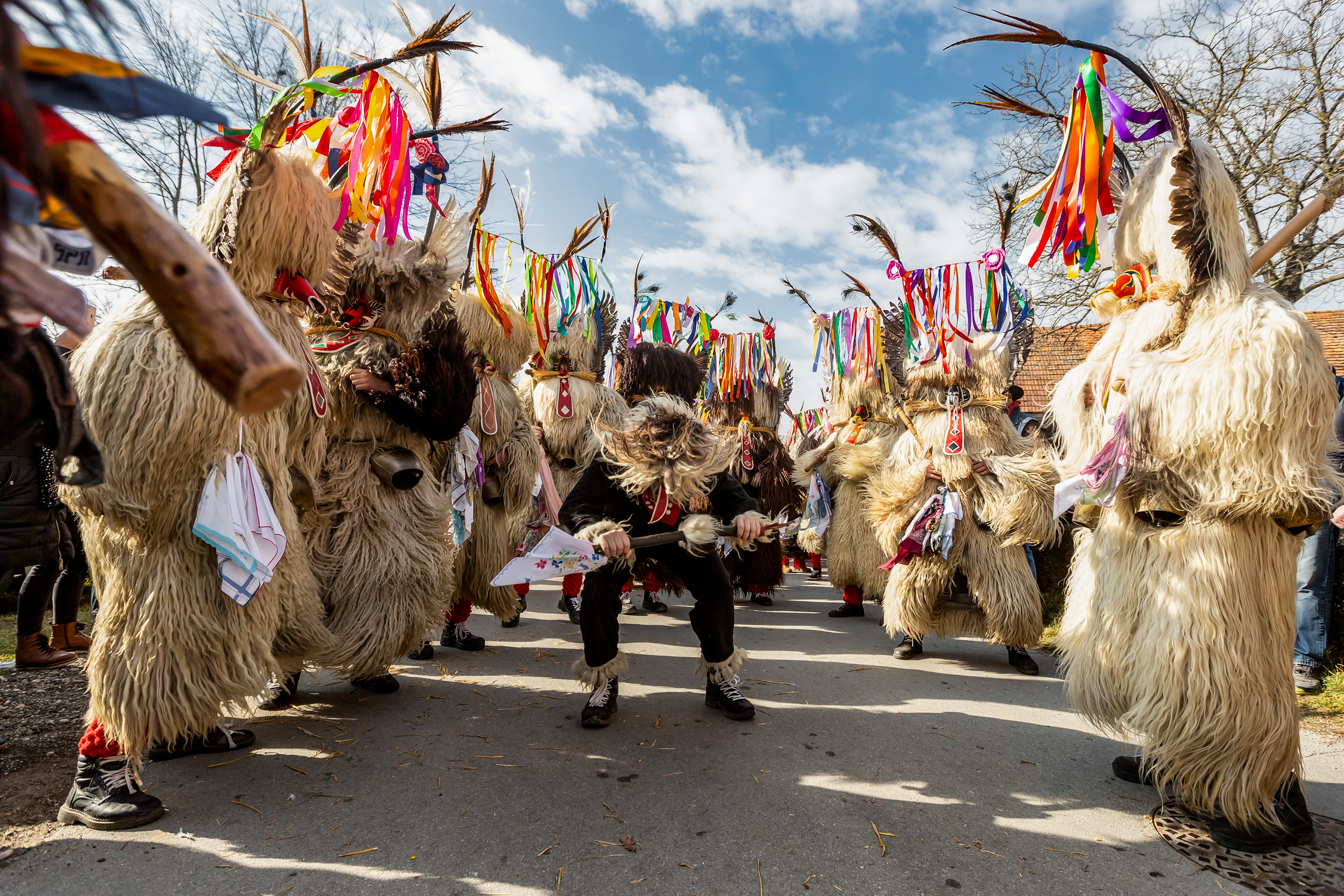
Kurent (Korant), the main figure

Date	Indigenous character(s)	Day
↓ In old town every night at 6:00 pm ↓ (on Shrove Saturday exceptionally at 12:30 PM)
4th	The Whip Crackers, Rusas, Kurents (Korants)	pre-Shrove Sunday
5th	Ploughmen, Old Woman Carrying Her Man, Kurents	pre-Shrove Monday
6th	Gypsies, Kurents (Korants)	pre-Shrove Tuesday
8th	Spearman, Fairies, Cockerels, Bears, Serfs, Kurents	Shrove Thursday
9th	Jürek and Rabolj, Log-Haulers, Kurents (Korants)	Shrove Friday
10th	Kurents (Korants)	Shrove Saturday
12th	Kurents (Korants)	Shrove Monday

=== Musical entertainment ===
From 3–13 February 2024, various music acts will perform at Kampus Hall, a commercial part completely separated from the carnival.

== Indigenous characters ==
Indigenous characters (masks) from Ptuj wider area including Ptuj field, Drava field and from Haloze:

- "Kurent" or "Korant" (the main character)
- "The Whip Crackers" (for happiness and well-being)
- "Carnival dancers" (from Pobrežje, Videm)
- "the Spearman" (marital character)
- "Ploughmen" (draw a magic circle)
- "Log-Haulers" (to enchant fertility)
- "The Devil" (fear, fear, is coming)
- "The Trough" (the straw bride)
- "Old Woman Carrying Her Man" (spirits of heaven)
- "The Mischievous Bear" (from Ptuj field)
- "Kurike and Piceki" (for a good harvest)
- "Jürek and Rabolj" (from Haloze)
- "Fairies" (Zabovci)
- "Rusas" (from Ptuj field)
- "Gypsis" (from Dornava)

== Prince of the carnival ==
Francesco Guffante, city judge, will take over the keys of the city hall from the mayor at the carnival opening (3.2.) to "rule" the town for 11 days.

== Routes ==
=== Opening Ethnic Procession (3 February) ===
- Muzejski trg – Prešernova – Slovenski trg – Slomškova – Miklošičeva – Mestni trg – Krempljeva – Minoritski trg – Mihelič gallery

=== Day of Kurent Groups (7 February) ===
- Prešernova – Slovenski trg – Slomškova – Miklošičeva – Mestni trg – Murkova (Kurent's House)

=== International Carnival Parade (11 February) ===
- Potrčeva – Kivi junction – Trstenjakova – Vinarski trg – Lackova – Mestni trg – Krempljeva – Minoritski trg – Mihelič gallery
