= Kurentovanje =

11-day Carnival event in Slovenia

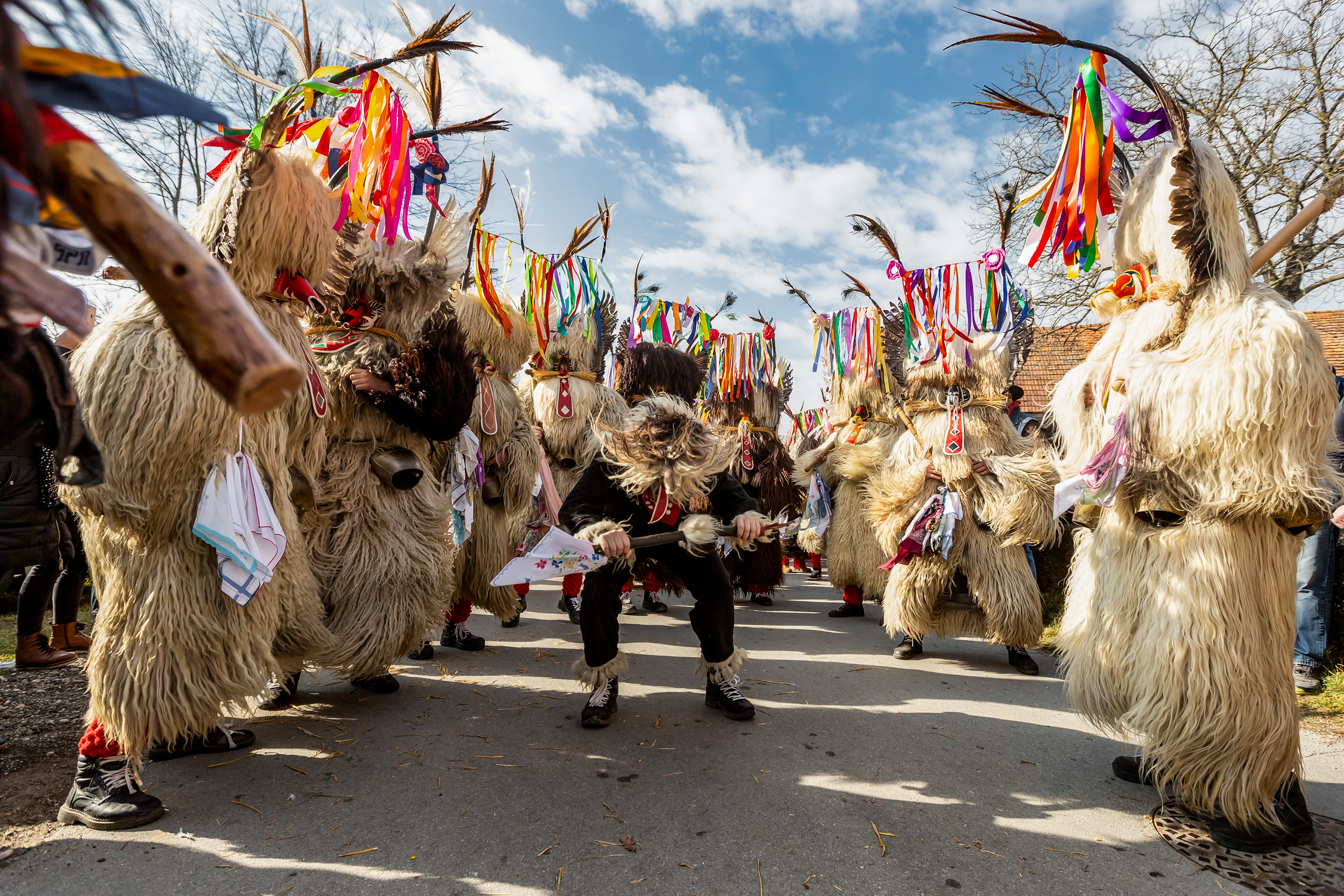
- Korant or Kurent
- Also called: 5th season, Europe's greatest outdoor ethno carnival
- Type: cultural
- Significance: Celebration prior to fasting season of Lent.
- Celebrations: Parades, parties, open-air performances
- Begins: 11 days before Ash Wednesday (57 days before Easter)
- Ends: Shrove Tuesday (47 days before Easter)
- 2026 date: 3–13 February
- 2027 date: 6–16 February
- 2028 date: 19 February – 1 March
- Duration: 11 days
- Frequency: annual
- Related to: Carnival, Ash Wednesday, Lent

Kurentovanje is Slovenia's most popular and ethnologically significant carnival event first organised in 1960 by Drago Hasl and his associates from cultural and educational organizations. This 11-day rite of spring and fertility highlight event is celebrated on Shrove Sunday in Ptuj, the oldest documented city in the region, and draws around 100,000 participants in total each year. In 2016 proclaimed as the 7th largest carnival in the world by Lonely Planet.

Its main figure, known as Kurent or Korent, has been popularly (but incorrectly) reinterpreted as an extravagant god of unrestrained pleasure and hedonism in early Slavic customs. In today's festival, groups of kurents or kurenti wear traditional sheepskin garments while holding wooden clubs with hedgehog skins attached called ježevke, the noise of which is believed to "chase away winter". In this way, the presence of kurenti announces the end of winter and beginning of spring. Being a kurent was at first a privilege offered only to unmarried men, but today, married men, children and women are also invited to wear the outfit.

In 2010, the 50th anniversary of the first organized instance of this festival was celebrated. As the host of the festival, the town of Ptuj was admitted into the Federation of European Carnival Cities in 1991.

In 2017 Door-to-door rounds of Kurents was inscribed on the UNESCO Representative List of the Intangible Cultural Heritage of Humanity.

== Festival origins ==
The idea of an organized carnival in Ptuj was born in 1955, when the carnival was organised by Svoboda, accompanied by a brass band, in processions on Shrove Tuesday. There were also Franc Kolarič and his friend from Markovci (birthplace of Kurent) masked in ethnographic costumes of Spearmen. Hasl who was there and impressed with the tradition, immediately decided to plan Kurentovanje, meeting with Kolarič over the years until it officially became reality 5 years later.

In 1959, on Shrove Saturday, Hasl, Kolarič and committee organised an unofficial Kurentovanje.

This event continued to grow, thanks in no small part to Ptuj cultural historian Drago Hasl (1900–1976). Hasl, an indefatigable organiser of Kurentovanje from its beginnings until the 1970s, was strongly convinced that this event could help prevent what he saw as the extremely rapid disappearance of carnival habits and traditional customs in surrounding villages. In 1959, Hasl, strongly backed by those who shared both his views and enthusiasm for the event, proposed that the Historical Society of Ptuj take over the organisation and the implementation of the carnival event. He suggested that the event should be named after the most well-known costumes Kurent – and Kurentovanje was born. Hasl prepared a draft regarding the content and outlining the major guidelines to be followed to transform Kurentovanje into an event of ethnographic significance. His vision of an event comprising the unique carnival figures and habits from the Ptuj region, which could be joined at a later stage by other traditional Slovene costumes, helped to make the event grow into a festival of costumes. He additionally planned to expand the content of the event by introducing contemporary carnival costumes.

== The first "modern" version of the Kurentovanje festival ==
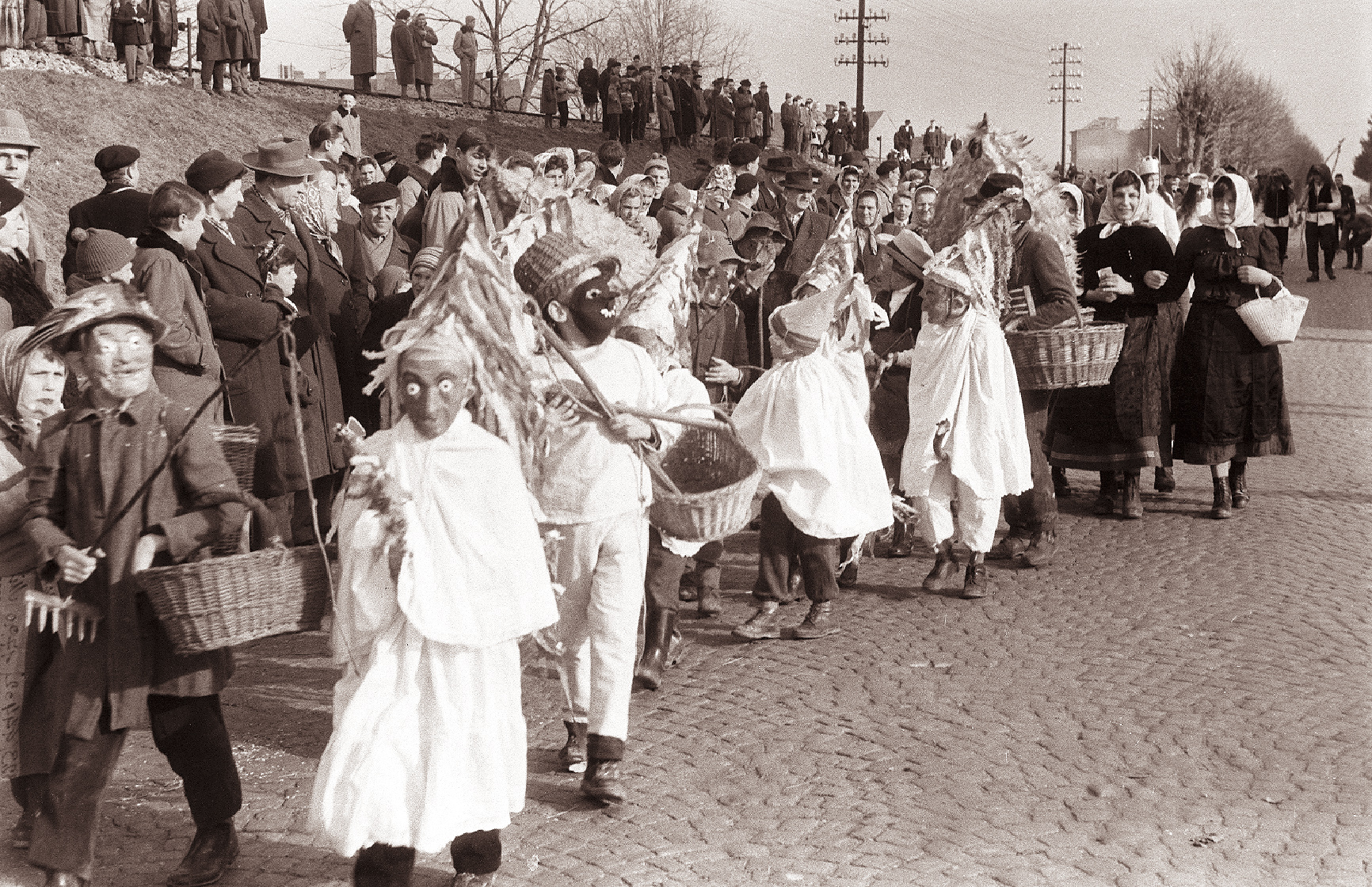
One of the first instances of Kurentovanje in 1961.

On Shrove Saturday, 27 February 1960, the first modern version of the festival, called Kurentovanje, was organized by Drago Hasl and friends in Ptuj, featuring traditional carnival costumes from Markovci. Carnival participants lined up in a procession. The procession leaders were spearmen followed by ploughmen, "rusa" (a bear), fairies, cockerels, and Kurents, all dancing to the sound of music played by a local band. The performance and customs of each traditional costume were explained to the gathered crowd via loudspeakers. The event met with tremendous success and aroused general interest which encouraged the organizers to continue.

One year later, the Markovci costumes were joined by ploughmen from Lancova Vas, log-haulers from Cirkovci, and mourners from Hajdina. For the first time, carnival (non-ethnographic) groups presented themselves in the afternoon. In 1962 the event reached beyond local boundaries by inviting other carnival figures such as lavfarji (< Bavarian German Laufer 'runner') from Cerkno and borovo gostuvanje (literally, "pine wedding participants") from Predanovci in the Prekmurje region.

=== Internationalization ===
The international aspect of the event was acquired in the following years when local and Slovene traditional costumes were joined by costumes from: Croatia, Serbia, North Macedonia, Hungary, Austria, Italy, Japan and many other countries. The number of participants and spectators grew over the years, with thousands visiting the Carnival events to marvel at the spectacular costumes and take part in the fun.

For many years, the main part of the event had been the presentation of individual traditional carnival groups. This took place either on the Saturday or Sunday morning prior to the afternoon procession.

== Extending the festival's program ==
In 1994, the festival's program was extended to more than two days, featuring a multitude of events, performances in the square in front of the city hall, the burial of the Carnival, and an entertainment program in the carnival tent. From 1999 on, the Prince of the Carnival event was introduced with the enthronement of the Prince that takes place on 11 November (St. Martin's Day). This has become an important cultural and entertaining event in itself.

During the past few years, the carnival has begun precisely at midnight on 2 February—Candlemas. Budina, one of the mostly rural suburbs of Ptuj, stages the event. This event includes a huge bonfire around which, at the stroke of midnight, Kurents—for this event equipped relatively simply with a chain and five bells and a wooden club—start to dance, thus announcing the beginning of carnival. From this moment on Kurents are "allowed" to make their habitual rounds.

Nowadays the festival lasts for approximately eleven days, starting on Saturday, a week before Shrove Sunday, when only traditional carnival costumes form a procession on the streets of Ptuj and when the Prince of the Carnival is bestowed the honour of ruling the town during the carnival period. Each day features performances by individuals in costumes and many other types of entertainment which take place on the square in front of the town hall and in the carnival tent.

Activities culminate with Saturday's procession of traditional carnival costumes, the children's carnival parade, the burial of Carnival and the return of power to the mayor of the town. However, because there are sometimes fewer days between Candlemas and Shrove Tuesday, other activities are of shorter duration as well. Consequently, this strongly influences the entire program and development of the event each year.

== Indigenous characters ==
Indigenous characters (masks) from Ptuj wider area including Ptuj field, Drava field and from Haloze:

- "Kurent" or "Korant" (the main character)
- "The Whip Crackers" (for happiness and well-being)
- "Carnival dancers" (from Pobrežje, Videm)
- "the Spearman" (martial character)
- "Ploughmen" (draw a magic circle)
- "Log-Haulers" (to enchant fertility)
- "The Devil" (fear, fear, is coming)
- "The Trough" (the straw bride)
- "Old Woman Carrying Her Man" (spirits of heaven)
- "The Mischievous Bear" (from Ptuj field)
- "Hens and Cockerels" (for a good harvest)
- "Jürek and Rabolj" (from Haloze)
- "Fairies" (Zabovci)
- "Rusas" (from Ptuj field)
- "Gypsies" (from Dornava)

== Kurent or Korant - the main carnival figure ==
Kurent or Korant is the best-known traditional carnival figure of the entire region, as well as in all of Slovenia. The name is probably derived from the common noun kurant 'messenger, lackey, footman', borrowed from a Romance word from Latin currens 'running'—thus sharing a semantic base with the Cerkno term lavfar. While Kurent groups might not all look exactly the same, it is the most popular and frequent traditional carnival figure in the Ptuj and Drava plains, and in the Haloze Hills.

Kurent or Korant, as it is known today, has its origin in popular tradition. Traditionally, the Kurent's outfit was reserved for unmarried men, but nowadays Kurent-Korant can be unmarried or married men, as well as women, children, and animals.

The two types of Slovene Kurent-Korant are the so-called "feathery" (from the town of Markovci) and the "horned" ones (from Haloze), with the difference being mainly in the look of the head covering. The Kurent-Korant wears a massive sheepskin garment. Around its waist hangs a chain with huge bells attached—the resulting noise does a great job of "chasing away winter", which is, ostensibly, the Kurent's function. The Korent also wears heavy boots and special red or green leg warmers, while the head is covered by a towering furry hat festooned with ribbons, and a mask typically sporting a long, red tongue. A wooden club is normally carried in the left hand.

== Carnival parade list ==
In 1960 and 1961, the event was held on Shrove Saturday. Since 1962, the event has been held on Shrove Sunday. Between 1962 and 1991, the program was scheduled in two parts: abefore noon there was parade of traditional costumes only in the city stadium, and the carnival was held in the town streets in the afternoon. With gathering of over 50,000 people each year on Sunday Shrove, this is the biggest Slovenian daily public event next to Planica Ski Flying event.

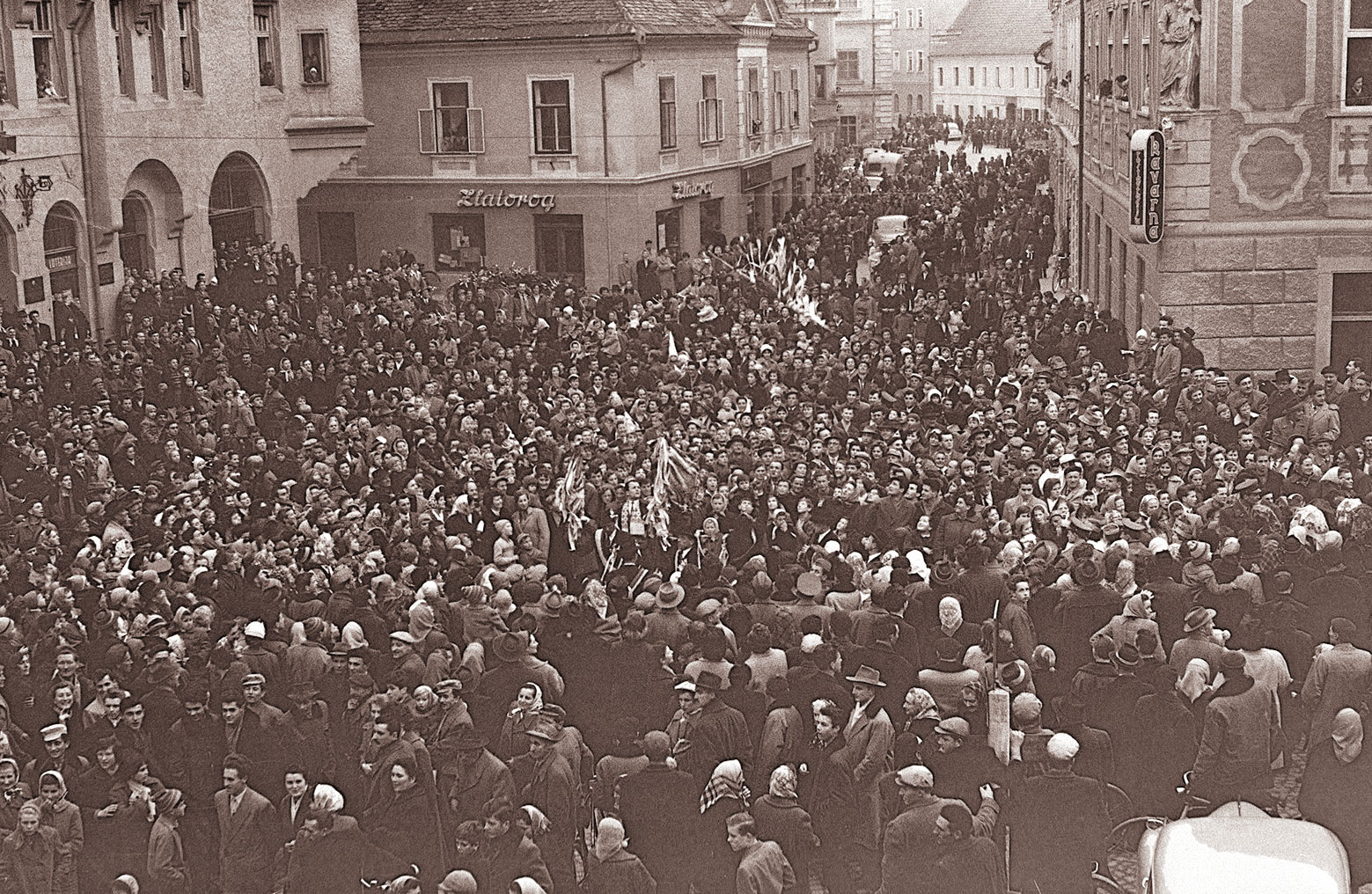
First kurentovanje (1960). At main square.

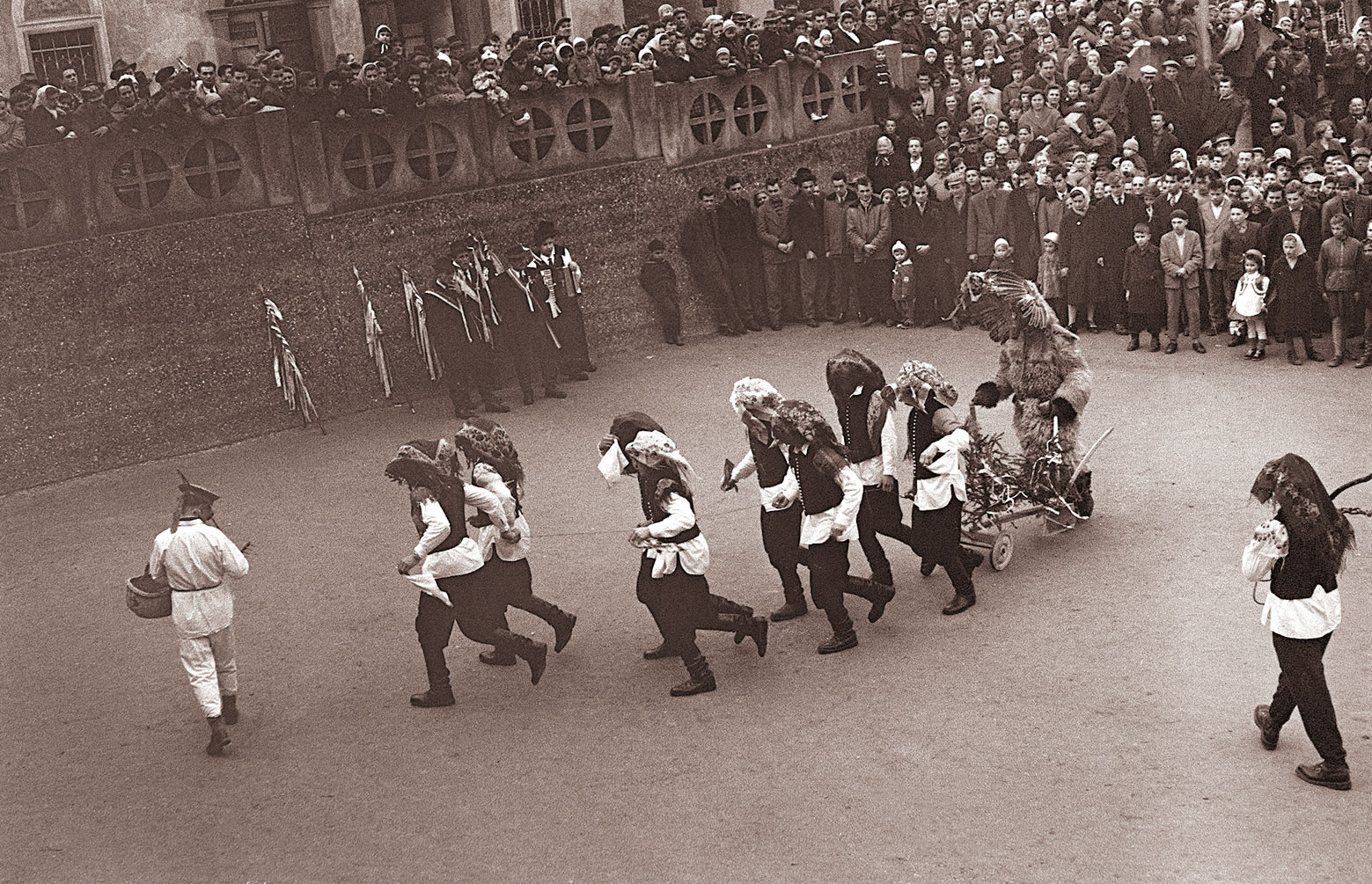
First kurentovanje (1960). At market square.

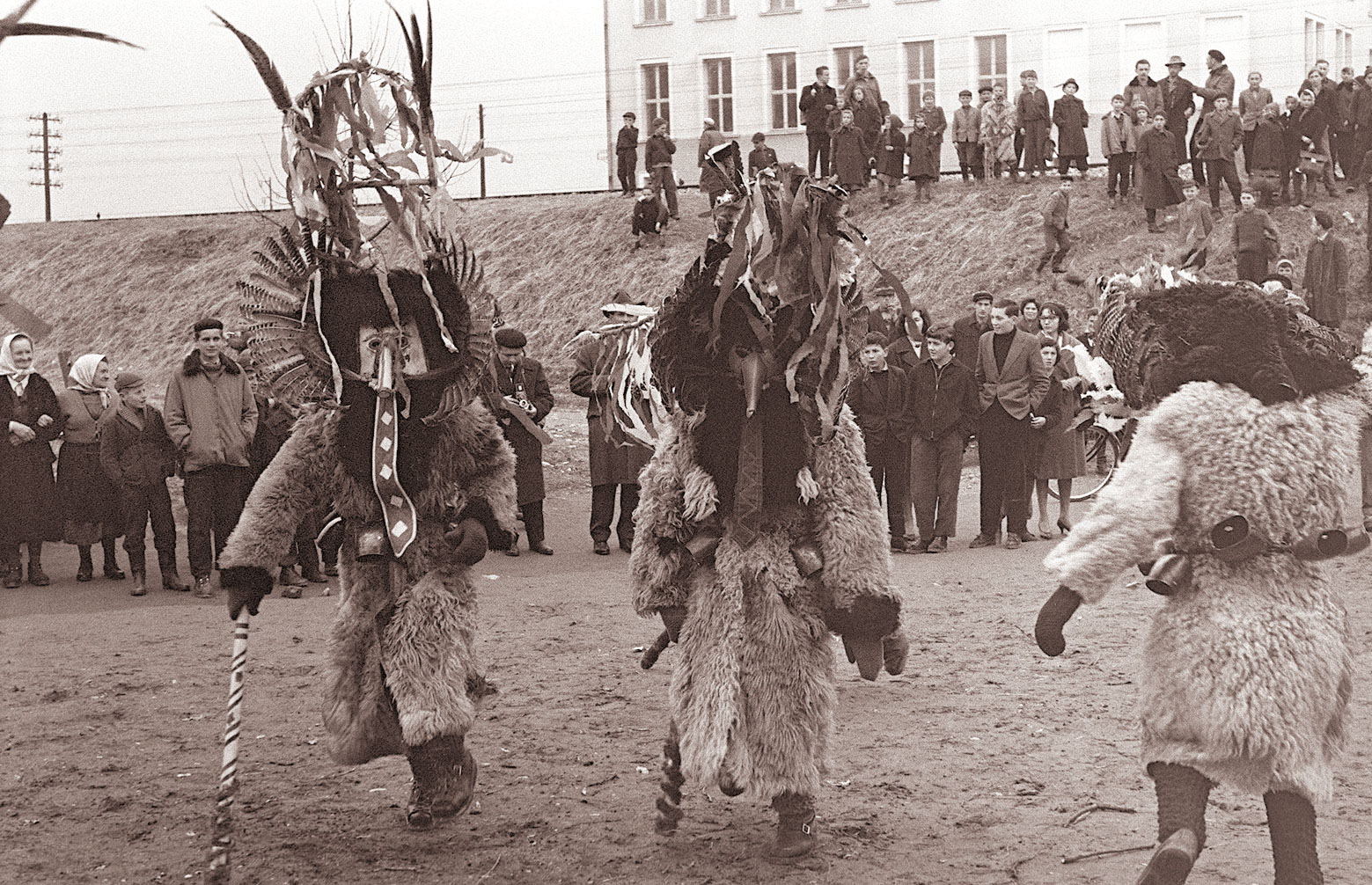
First kurentovanje (1960). At main park.

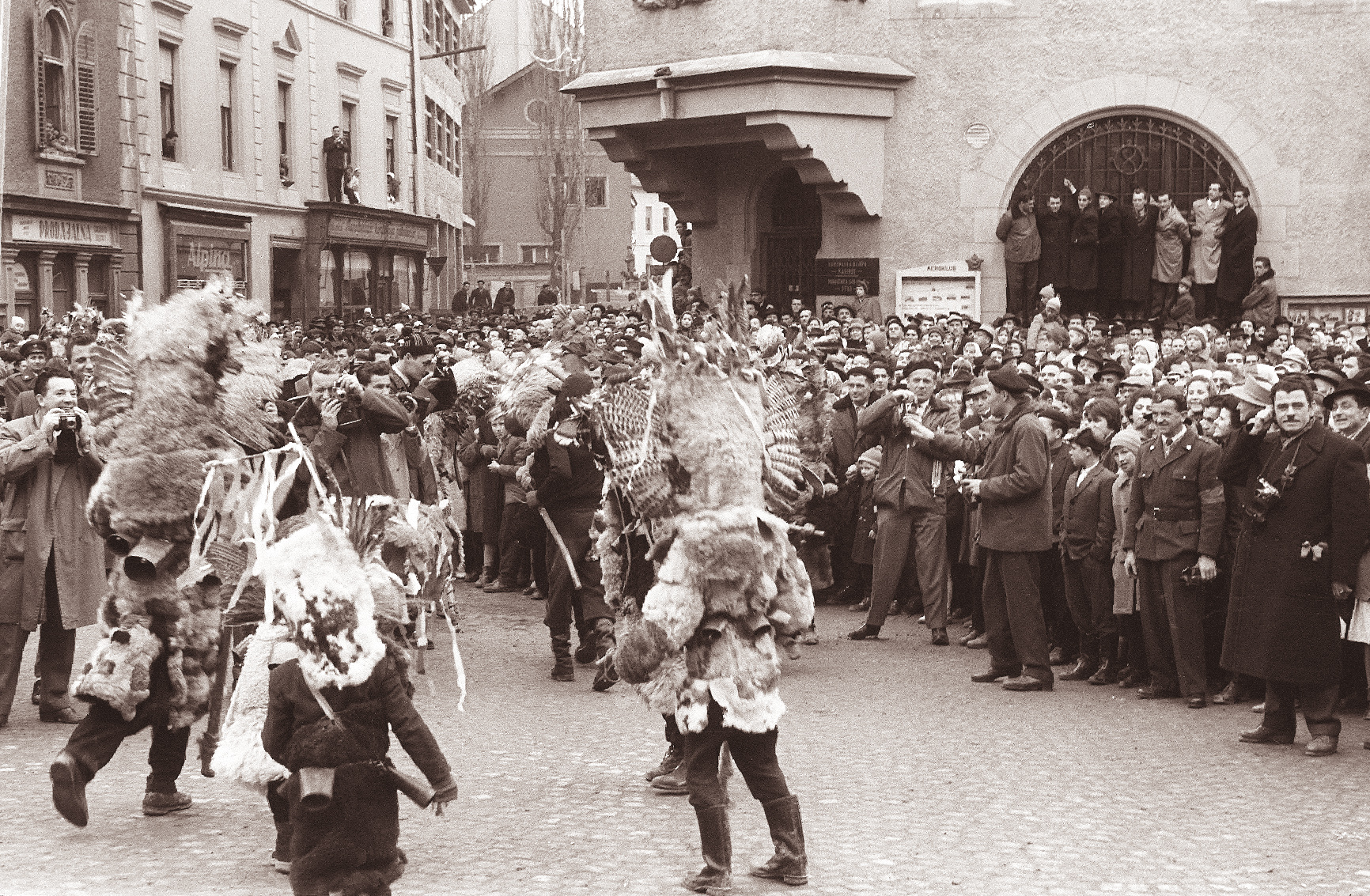
Second kurentovanje (1961).

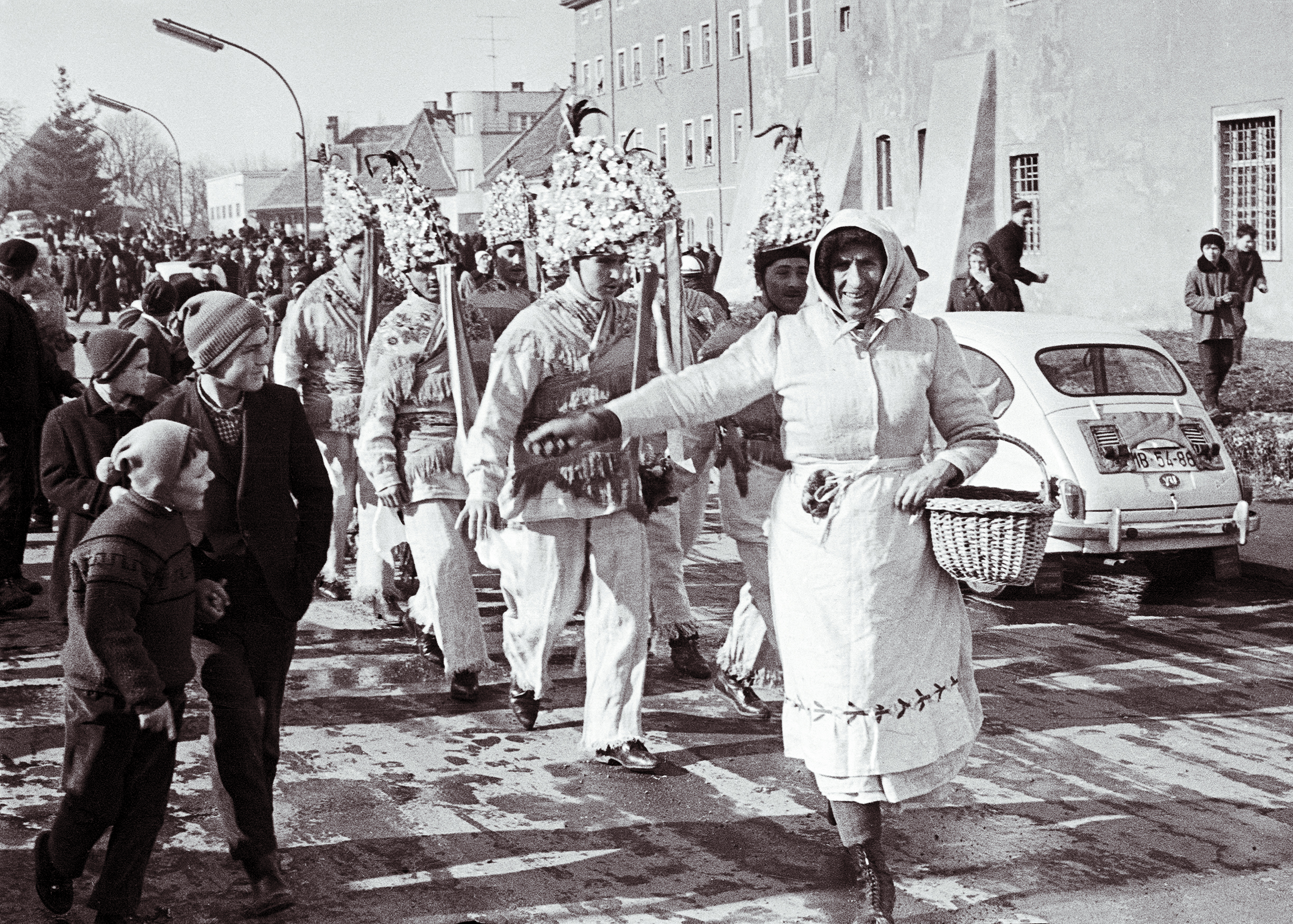
Fifth kurentovanje (1964).

Edition	Year	Day	Date	Visit
↓ Historic Society Ptuj ↓
1	1960	Shrove Saturday	27 February	6,000
2	1961	Shrove Sunday	11 February	14,000
3	1962	Shrove Sunday	4 March	20,000
↓ Folklore Events Ptuj ↓
4	1963	Shrove Sunday	24 February	N/A
↓ DPD "Svoboda" Ptuj (Local carnival replaced Kurentovanje) ↓
—	1964	Shrove Sunday; Shrove Tuesday	9 February; 11 February	N/A
↓ Folklore Events Ptuj ↓
5	1965	Shrove Sunday	28 February	30,000
6	1966	Shrove Saturday; Shrove Sunday	19 February; 20 February	30,000
7	1967	Shrove Sunday	5 February	cancelled
8	1968	Shrove Sunday	25 February	20,000
↓ Folklore Society Ptuj ↓
9	1969	Shrove Sunday	16 February	20,000
10	1970	Shrove Sunday	8 February	N/A
11	1971	Shrove Sunday	21 February	35,000
12	1972	Shrove Sunday	13 February	N/A
↓ Folklore Society Ptuj, Tourism Society Ptuj ↓
13	1973	Shrove Sunday	4 March	40-50,000
14	1974	Shrove Sunday	24 February	40-50,000
15	1975	Shrove Sunday	9 February	40,000
16	1976	Shrove Sunday	29 February	45,000
17	1977	Shrove Sunday	20 February	40,000
18	1978	Shrove Sunday	5 February	N/A
19	1979	Shrove Sunday	26 February	40,000
20	1980	Shrove Sunday	17 February	N/A
21	1981	Shrove Sunday	1 March	40,000
22	1982	Shrove Sunday	21 February	40,000
23	1983	Shrove Sunday	13 February	N/A
24	1984	Shrove Sunday	4 March	N/A
25	1985	Shrove Sunday	17 February	N/A
26	1986	Shrove Sunday	9 February	N/A
27	1987	Shrove Sunday	1 March	N/A
28	1988	Shrove Sunday	14 February	45,000
29	1989	Shrove Sunday	5 February	40,000
30	1990	Shrove Sunday	25 February	50,000
31	1991	Shrove Sunday	10 February	N/A
32	1992	Shrove Sunday	1 March	N/A
33	1993	Shrove Sunday	21 February	30,000
34	1994	Shrove Sunday	13 February	N/A
35	1995	Shrove Sunday	26 February	N/A
36	1996	Shrove Sunday	25 February	25,000
37	1997	Shrove Sunday	9 February	40,000
38	1998	Shrove Sunday	22 February	50,000
39	1999	Shrove Sunday	14 February	10,000
40	2000	Shrove Sunday	5 March	50-60,000
41	2001	Shrove Sunday	25 February	45,000
42	2002	Shrove Sunday	10 February	50,000
43	2003	Shrove Sunday	2 March	60,000
44	2004	Shrove Sunday	22 February	N/A
45	2005	Shrove Sunday	6 February	50,000
46	2006	Shrove Sunday	26 February	N/A
47	2007	Shrove Sunday	18 February	40,000
48	2008	Shrove Sunday	3 February	50,000
49	2009	Shrove Sunday	22 February	55,000
50	2010	Shrove Sunday	14 February	60,000
51	2011	Shrove Sunday	6 March	65,000
52	2012	Shrove Sunday	19 February	60,000
53	2013	Shrove Sunday	10 February	30,000
54	2014	Shrove Sunday	2 March	50,000
55	2015	Shrove Sunday	17 February	55,000
56	2016	Shrove Sunday	7 February	40,000
57	2017	Shrove Sunday	26 February	60,000
58	2018	Shrove Sunday	11 February	60,000
59	2019	Shrove Sunday	3 March	45,000
60	2020	Shrove Sunday	23 February	50,000
61	2021	Shrove Sunday	14 February	virtual

- 1972 - only on stadium event, no city carnival.
- 1992 - no classic carnival, limited to four city squares only.

== Traditional events ==
=== Introduction ===
Since	Event	Always on the same day
2001	Kurent (Korant) Jump	Midnight ritual by the fire at Zoki's homestead in Budina (Candlemas – 2 to 3 February)

=== Main events ===
Since	Events	Always on the same day
↓ Ethnic and carnival parades ↓
1998	Opening Ethnic Procession	pre-Shrove Saturday
2020	Day of Kurent (Korant) Groups	pre-Shrove Wednesday
2015	A Night Spectacle	Shrove Friday
1873	City Carnival Promenade	Shrove Saturday
2013	City Carnival Promenade	Shrove Saturday
1960	International Carnival Parade	Shrove Sunday
1960	Slovenian Kindergartens Parade	Shrove Monday
1960	Burial Shrove	Shrove Tuesday

=== Accompanying events ===
Since	Charity cooking event	Always on the same day
2006	Obarjada	pre-Shrove Saturday

Since	Art events		Always on the same day
2009	Ex-Tempore	Art colony	pre-Shrove Saturday
2009	Ex-Tempore	Exhibition Opening	Shrove Saturday

== Princes of carnival ==
First prince of the Kurentovanje carnival was inaugurated on 11 November 1999, as now became tradition. At the initiative of Branko Brumen, one of the main organisers of Kurentovanje and vice president of FECC, as he saw this folklore on other carnivals in Europe long before Ptuj. In 2000 first prince "took" mayor's office for the period of eleven days of Kurentovanje carnival. Since 2013 princes have two-year mandate.

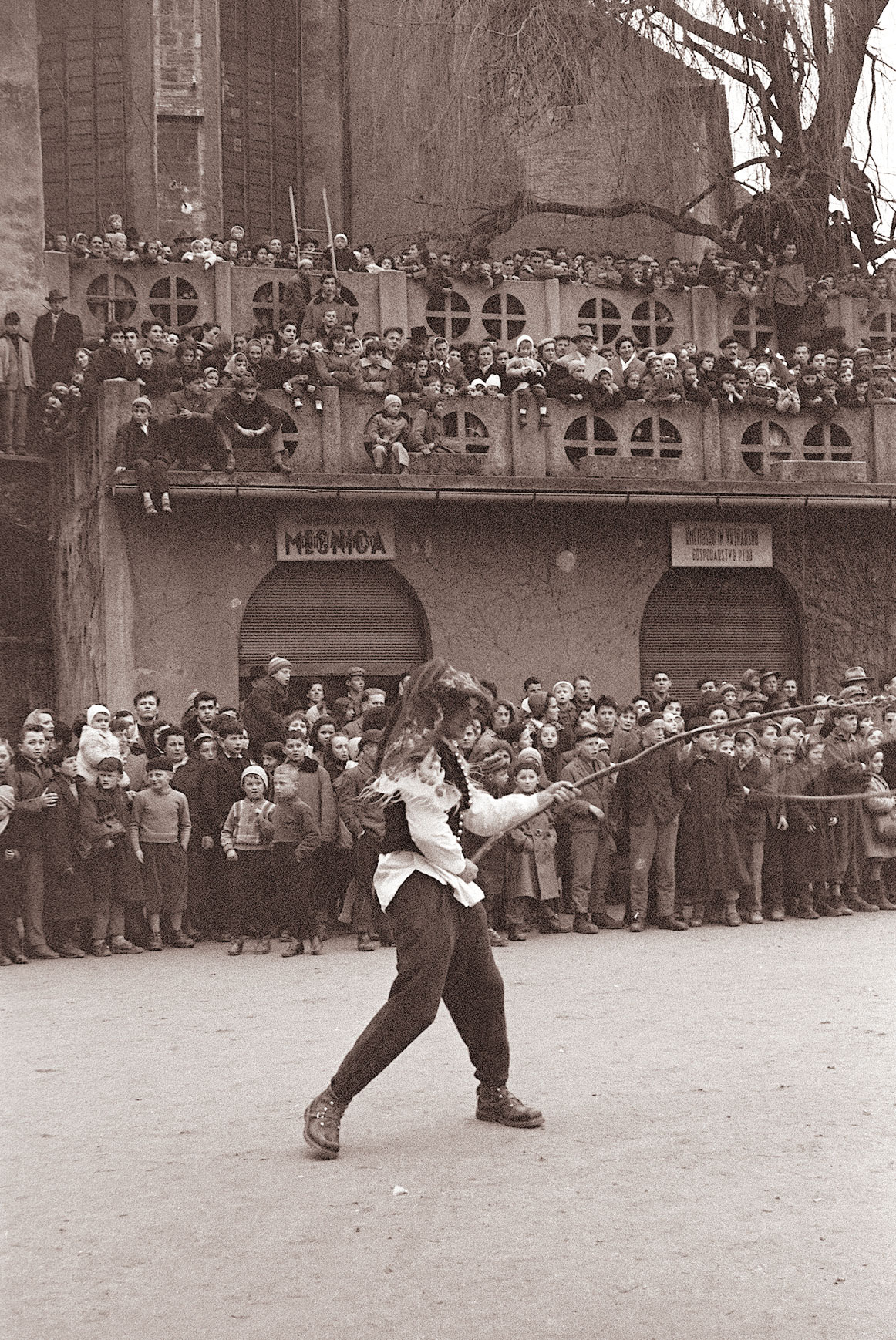
First edition (1960) with "The Whip Cracker" at Market square.

#	Prince	Town mandate	Year
1	Jože Gašperšič as Gašper I	26 February – 7 March	2000
2	Zvonko Križaj as Matevž Zoki II	17 – 27 February	2001
3	Zlatko Gajšek as Don Zlatko III	3 – 12 February	2002
4	Ivo Rajh as Noble Mošcon Rajh	22 Februar – 4 March	2003
5	Branko Cajnko as Cajnko Friderik V	14 – 24 February	2004
6	Marjan Cajnko as Noble Holoneški VI (Noble von Holleneck VI)	3 – 8 February	2005
7	Marko Klinc as Klinc Hauptmann of Spuhlja	18 – 28 February	2006
8	Slavko Kolar as Slavko Noble Kacherl	10 – 20 February	2007
9	Miran Urih as Majer Cirkovški (Majer of Cirkovce)	3 – 5 February	2008
10	Stanko Vegan as Vegan Turniški (Vegan of Thurn)	14 – 24 February	2009
11	Milan Senčar as Knight Senčar, Noble Bernhard of Ptuj	6 – 16 February	2010
12	Janez Golc as Noble Baron Jakob Breuner of Markovci	26 February – 8 March	2011
13	Vlado Hvalec as Noble Jurij Oprossnitzer	11 – 21 February	2012
Two-year mandate
14	Miroslav Slodnjak as Knight of Dornava	3 – 12 February; 22 February -– 4 March	2013; 2014
15	Rajko Jurgec as Bertold of Treun	9 – 19 February; 3 – 9 February	2015; 2016
16	Aleš Goričan as Noble Janez Maksimilijan Gregorič	18 – 28 February; 3 – 13 February	2017; 2018
17	Darko Cafuta as Jakob Baron Zekel of Videm	23 February – 5 March; 15 – 25 February	2019; 2020
Three-year mandate
18	Hinko Šoštarič as Knight Hinko Sodinski, noble Gall	6 – 16 February; 19 February – 1 March; 11 – 21 February	2021; 2022; 2023
Two-year mandate
19	Marko Šamperl as Francesco Guffante, city judge	3 – 13 February; 22 February – 4 March	2024; 2025

== Outside of Slovenia ==
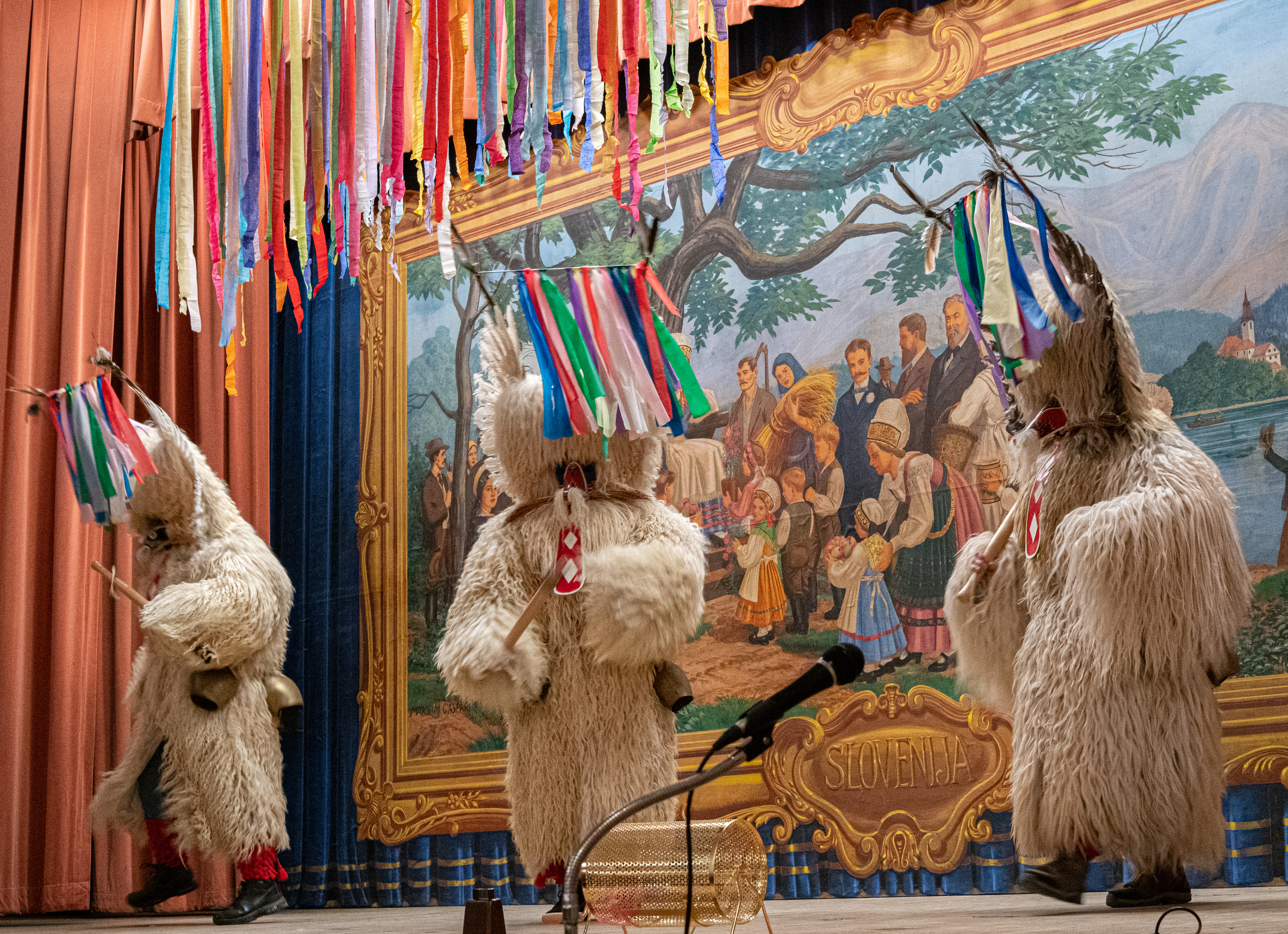
Slovenian Kurentovanje kurenti in Cleveland, Ohio, United States at the Slovenian National Home.

Cleveland, Ohio, United States has one of the largest Slovenian American communities outside of Europe. Centered around St. Vitus Church, the St. Clair–Superior neighborhood began hosting a local version of Kurentovanje in the 2013. The celebration is conducted on the Saturday prior to Ash Wednesday.

== See also ==
- Kukeri
- Busójárás
- Pre-Christian Alpine traditions
- Zvončari
- Koledari
