= Prvenci =

- Location in Slovenia
- Coordinates: 46°24′20.29″N 15°57′21.46″E
- Country: Slovenia
- Traditional region: Styria
- Statistical region: Drava
- Municipality: Markovci

Area
  - Total: 1.87 km^{2} (0.72 sq mi)
- Elevation: 218.4 m (717 ft)

Population (2002)
  - Total: 224

Prvenci (pronounced [ˈpəɾʋɛntsi]) is a roadside village in the Municipality of Markovci in northeastern Slovenia. It was first mentioned in written documents dating to 1322. The area is part of the traditional region of Styria. It is now included with the rest of the municipality in the Drava Statistical Region.
