= Municipality of Markovci =

Municipality of Slovenia

Municipality of Markovci Občina Markovci
- Municipality
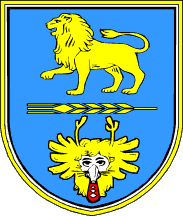
- Coat of arms

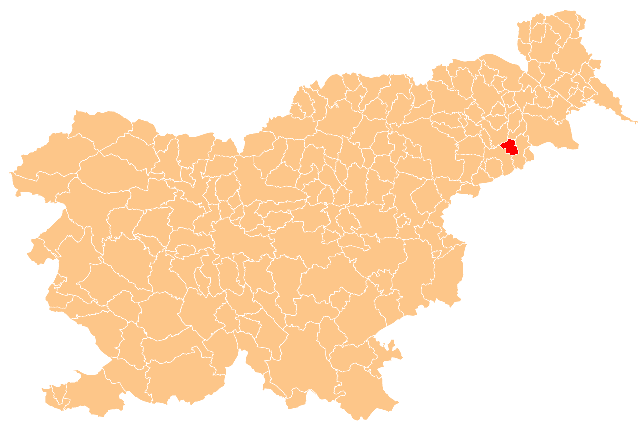
- Location of the Municipality of Markovci in Slovenia
- Coordinates: 46°23′N 15°57′E
- Country: Slovenia

Government
  - Mayor: Milan Gabrovec (LDS)

Area
  - Total: 29.8 km^{2} (11.5 sq mi)

Population (2018)
  - Total: 4,005
  - Density: 134/km^{2} (348/sq mi)
- Time zone: UTC+01 (CET)
  - Summer (DST): UTC+02 (CEST)
- Website: www.markovci.si

The Municipality of Markovci (pronounced [ˈmaːɾkɔu̯tsi]; Slovene: Občina Markovci) is a municipality in the traditional region of Styria in northeastern Slovenia. The seat of the municipality is the town of Markovci. Markovci became a municipality in 1998.

== Settlements ==
In addition to the municipal seat of Markovci, the municipality also includes the following settlements:

- Borovci
- Bukovci
- Nova Vas pri Markovcih
- Prvenci
- Sobetinci
- Stojnci
- Strelci
- Zabovci
