= Sobetinci =

- Location in Slovenia
- Coordinates: 46°24′11.72″N 15°58′17.49″E
- Country: Slovenia
- Traditional region: Styria
- Statistical region: Drava
- Municipality: Markovci

Area
  - Total: 1.73 km^{2} (0.67 sq mi)
- Elevation: 216.6 m (711 ft)

Population (2002)
  - Total: 181

Sobetinci (pronounced [ˈsoːbɛtintsi]) is a settlement in the Municipality of Markovci in northeastern Slovenia. Its earliest known mention in written documents comes from an urbarium of the Archbishopric of Salzburg dating to 1322. The area is part of the traditional region of Styria. It is now included with the rest of the municipality in the Drava Statistical Region.
