= Strelci, Markovci =

Strelci
- Location in Slovenia
- Coordinates: 46°24′54.6″N 15°58′3.27″E
- Country: Slovenia
- Traditional region: Styria
- Statistical region: Drava
- Municipality: Markovci

Area
  - Total: 0.63 km^{2} (0.24 sq mi)
- Elevation: 216.5 m (710 ft)

Population (2002)
  - Total: 103

Strelci (pronounced [ˈstreːltsi]) is a small village in the Municipality of Markovci in northeastern Slovenia. It lies along a small road off the main regional road from Ptuj to Ormož. The area is part of the traditional region of Styria. It is now included with the rest of the municipality in the Drava Statistical Region.
