= Borovci, Markovci =

Borovci
- Location in Slovenia
- Coordinates: 46°25′4.08″N 15°56′34.92″E
- Country: Slovenia
- Traditional region: Styria
- Statistical region: Drava
- Municipality: Markovci

Area
  - Total: 1.58 km^{2} (0.61 sq mi)
- Elevation: 219.2 m (719 ft)

Population (2002)
  - Total: 263

Borovci (pronounced [ˈboːɾɔu̯tsi]) is a settlement in the Municipality of Markovci in northeastern Slovenia. It is a roadside village on the regional road from Ptuj to Ormož. It was first mentioned in written documents dating to 1458 as Worofcze. The area is part of the traditional region of Styria. It is now included with the rest of the municipality in the Drava Statistical Region.

Two small roadside chapel-shrines in the settlement date to the late 19th and early 20th centuries.
