= Bukovci, Markovci =

Bukovci
- Location in Slovenia
- Coordinates: 46°23′17.9″N 15°57′45.64″E
- Country: Slovenia
- Traditional region: Styria
- Statistical region: Drava
- Municipality: Markovci

Area
  - Total: 7.02 km^{2} (2.71 sq mi)
- Elevation: 215.8 m (708 ft)

Population (2002)
  - Total: 952

Bukovci (pronounced [ˈbuːkɔu̯tsi]) is a settlement in the Municipality of Markovci in northeastern Slovenia. It lies on the regional road from Ptuj to the border with Croatia and on to Varaždin. It was first mentioned in written documents dating to 1322. The area is part of the traditional region of Styria. It is now included with the rest of the municipality in the Drava Statistical Region.

== Geography ==
Locals divide the main part of the settlement into Zgornji Kunec (to the west) and Spodnji Kunec (in the center and to the east), and it also includes the hamlets of Hojkarji (or Hujkarji), Kolameršina, Novi Jork, Siget, and Vopošnica (or Vapočice, Vaupočica, or Vaupočice).

== Notable people ==
Notable people that were born or lived in Bukovci include:

- Janez Zemljarič (1928–2022), communist politician
