= Krčevina pri Vurbergu =

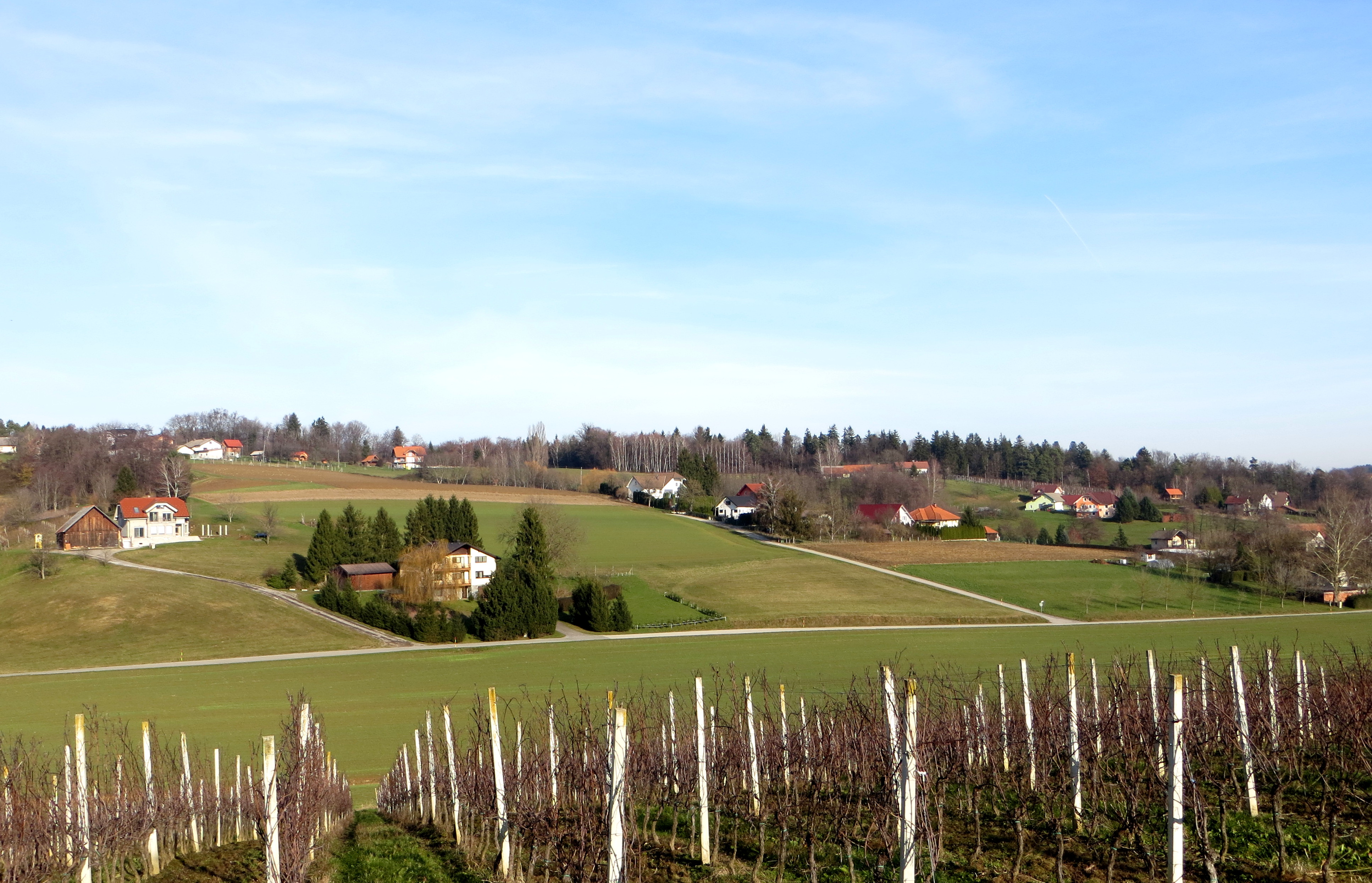

- Location in Slovenia
- Coordinates: 46°29′3.82″N 15°48′45.02″E
- Country: Slovenia
- Traditional region: Styria
- Statistical region: Drava
- Municipality: Ptuj

Area
  - Total: 9.7 km^{2} (3.7 sq mi)
- Elevation: 321.6 m (1,055 ft)

Population (2002)
  - Total: 811

Krčevina pri Vurbergu (pronounced [kɛɾtʃɛˈʋiːna pɾi ˈʋuːɾbɛɾɡu], in older sources also Krčovina, German: Kartschovina) is a settlement in the Municipality of Ptuj in northeastern Slovenia. It lies on the left bank of the Drava River and the hills beyond. The area is part of the traditional region of Styria. It is now included with the rest of the municipality in the Drava Statistical Region.
