= Bukovci =

- Village
- Location within Bosnia and Herzegovina
- Coordinates: 44°03′N 17°58′E
- Country: Bosnia and Herzegovina
- Entity: Federation of Bosnia and Herzegovina
- Canton: Central Bosnia
- Municipality: Busovača

Area
  - Total: 3.72 sq mi (9.64 km^{2})

Population (2013)
  - Total: 355
  - Density: 95.4/sq mi (36.8/km^{2})
- Time zone: UTC+1 (CET)
  - Summer (DST): UTC+2 (CEST)

Bukovci is a village in the municipality of Busovača, Bosnia and Herzegovina.

== Demographics ==
According to the 2013 census, its population was 355.

Ethnicity in 2013
Ethnicity	Number	Percentage
Bosniaks	303	85.4%
Croats	47	13.2%
Serbs	1	0.3%
other/undeclared	4	1.1%
Total	355	100%
