= Markovci =

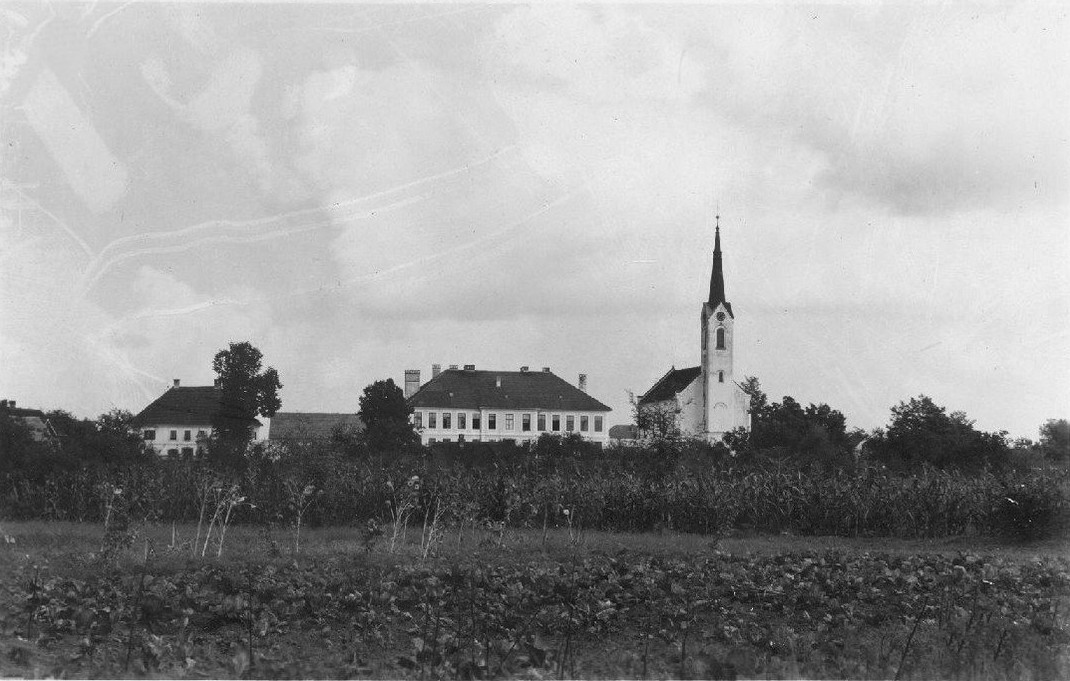

- Flag Coat of arms

- Location in Slovenia
- Coordinates: 46°23′44″N 15°55′53″E
- Country: Slovenia
- Traditional region: Styria
- Statistical region: Drava
- Municipality: Markovci

Government
  - Mayor: Milan Grabovec (LDS)

Area
  - Total: 2.43 km^{2} (0.94 sq mi)
- Elevation: 221.8 m (728 ft)

Population (2019)
  - Total: 495

Markovci (pronounced [ˈmaːɾkɔu̯tsi]) is a settlement in northeastern Slovenia. It is the seat of the Municipality of Markovci. It lies southeast of Ptuj next to Lake Ptuj, a reservoir on the Drava River. The area is part of the traditional region of Styria. The municipality is now included in the Drava Statistical Region.

The local parish church, from which the settlement gets its name, is dedicated to Saint Mark and belongs to the Roman Catholic Archdiocese of Maribor. It was built in 1871 on the site of a 16th-century building.
