= Spodnji Leskovec =

- Location in Slovenia
- Coordinates: 46°20′12.33″N 15°56′25.69″E
- Country: Slovenia
- Traditional region: Styria
- Statistical region: Drava
- Municipality: Videm

Area
  - Total: 1.86 km^{2} (0.72 sq mi)
- Elevation: 219.9 m (721 ft)

Population (2002)
  - Total: 115

Spodnji Leskovec (pronounced [ˈspoːdnji ˈleːskɔʋəts]) is a settlement in the valley of Lipnica Creek, a minor tributary of the Drava River in the Haloze Hills in eastern Slovenia. It is part of the Municipality of Videm. The area is part of the traditional region of Styria. It is now included in the Drava Statistical Region.

There is a small rectangular chapel-shrine with a polygonal apse in the settlement. It was built in 1909.
