= Emkej =

- Birth name: Marko Kocjan
- Origin: Maribor, Slovenia
- Genres: Conscious hip hop, rap
- Years active: 2006–present
- Labels: Wudisban Records
- Member of: Velebor, Tekochee Kru, Wudisban
- Website: www.emkej.ws

Emkej is a Slovenian rapper and founder of Wudisban Records from Maribor, Slovenia. He is also one of the most recognizable Slovenian hip hop figures and a member of hip hop group Tekochee Kru.

== Early career ==
Emkej started his rap career at a local group called B-Squad, formed with his friend Sniki and his neighbour Kato, who was the group's producer. Together they recorded music mostly at home and appeared at various local hip hop shows.

== Tekochee Kru and later career ==
In 2005, Emkej and Sniki joined one of Maribor's best known hip hop groups, Tekochee Kru. The first quickly established himself as the most prolific rapper among 7 members, appearing the most on their studio debut and also releasing his solo effort, titled 'Šmorn' in 2010. He continued touring the nation and released his second album in 2012.

== Discography ==
=== Solo albums ===
- Šmorn (2010)
- Znajdi se (2012)
- Probaj razumet (2017)
- VKBTM (2021)

=== Other ===
- adijo stari, kaki scenarij (with Tekochee Kru) (2007)
- Božja Gamad (with Velebor) (2013)
- Cifre (with DJ Splif) (2013)
- Sabljasti tiger (with Tekochee Kru) (2014)
- Probam Razumet (with Roots in Session) (2018)
