= Pacinje =

- Location in Slovenia
- Coordinates: 46°27′1.56″N 15°56′6.97″E
- Country: Slovenia
- Traditional region: Styria
- Statistical region: Drava
- Municipality: Ptuj

Area
  - Total: 2.62 km^{2} (1.01 sq mi)
- Elevation: 218.9 m (718 ft)

Population (2022)
  - Total: 236

Pacinje (pronounced [ˈpaːtsinjɛ]) is a village on the right bank of the Pesnica River in the Municipality of Ptuj in northeastern Slovenia. The area is part of the traditional region of Styria. It is now included with the rest of the municipality in the Drava Statistical Region.
