= Nova Vas pri Markovcih =

- Location in Slovenia
- Coordinates: 46°22′55.6″N 15°56′21.94″E
- Country: Slovenia
- Traditional region: Styria
- Statistical region: Drava
- Municipality: Markovci

Area
  - Total: 5.12 km^{2} (1.98 sq mi)
- Elevation: 214.4 m (703 ft)

Population (2002)
  - Total: 392

Nova Vas pri Markovcih (pronounced [ˈnɔːʋa ˈʋaːs pɾi ˈmaːɾkɔu̯tsix]; Slovene: Nova vas pri Markovcih) is a settlement on the regulated left bank of the Drava River in the Municipality of Markovci in northeastern Slovenia. The area is part of the traditional region of Styria. It is now included with the rest of the municipality in the Drava Statistical Region.
