= Dolena =

- Location in Slovenia
- Coordinates: 46°19′27.54″N 15°48′8.4″E
- Country: Slovenia
- Traditional region: Styria
- Statistical region: Drava
- Municipality: Videm

Area
  - Total: 6.69 km^{2} (2.58 sq mi)
- Elevation: 375 m (1,230 ft)

Population (2002)
  - Total: 182

Dolena (pronounced [dɔˈleːna]) is a settlement in the Haloze Hills in the Municipality of Videm in eastern Slovenia. The area is part of the traditional region of Styria. It is now included in the Drava Statistical Region.

Dobrava Castle was a castle in the settlement. It was first mentioned in written documents dating to 1419. The Partisans burned the castle to the ground in May 1944 and its ruins were removed after the war by an agricultural cooperative to develop the land.
