= Mestni Vrh =

- Location in Slovenia
- Coordinates: 46°26′49.47″N 15°51′32.17″E
- Country: Slovenia
- Traditional region: Styria
- Statistical region: Drava
- Municipality: Ptuj

Area
  - Total: 5.3 km^{2} (2.0 sq mi)
- Elevation: 281 m (922 ft)

Population (2002)
  - Total: 597

Mestni Vrh (pronounced [ˈmeːstni ˈʋərx], German: Stadtberg) is a settlement in the hills north of Ptuj in northeastern Slovenia. The area is part of the traditional region of Styria. It is now included with the rest of the Municipality of Ptuj in the Drava Statistical Region.
