= Grajenščak =

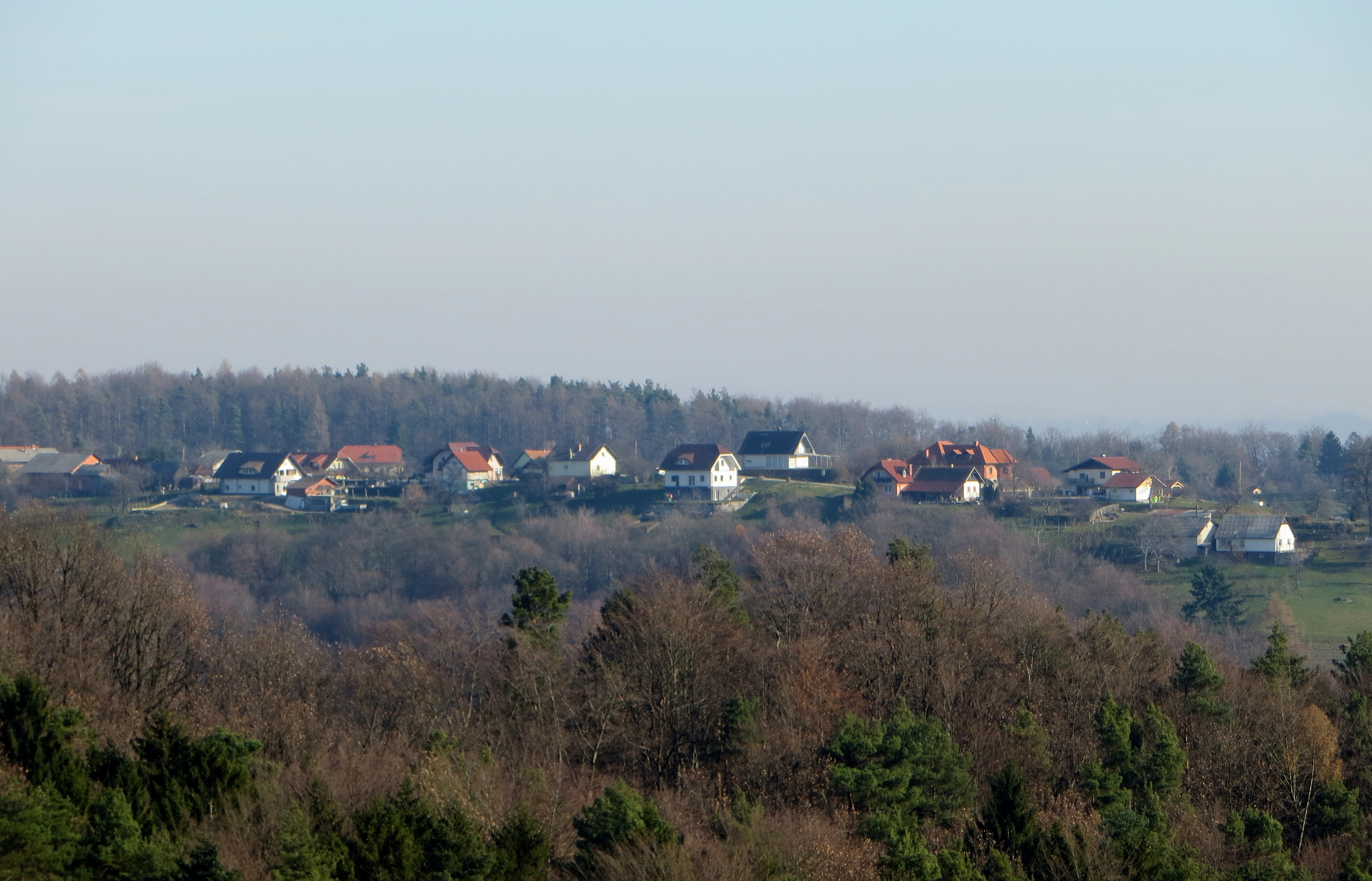

- Location in Slovenia
- Coordinates: 46°28′46.5″N 15°49′50.4″E
- Country: Slovenia
- Traditional region: Styria
- Statistical region: Drava
- Municipality: Ptuj

Area
  - Total: 4.42 km^{2} (1.71 sq mi)
- Elevation: 336.2 m (1,103 ft)

Population (2002)
  - Total: 444

Grajenščak (pronounced [ɡɾaˈjeːnʃtʃak], German: Grajenaberg) is a settlement in the Municipality of Ptuj in northeastern Slovenia. It lies on the edge of the Slovene Hills, north of Ptuj. The area is part of the traditional region of Styria. It is now included with the rest of the municipality in the Drava Statistical Region.
