= Sodinci =

- Location in Slovenia
- Coordinates: 46°25′44.76″N 16°4′45.6″E
- Country: Slovenia
- Traditional region: Styria
- Statistical region: Drava
- Municipality: Ormož

Area
  - Total: 2.85 km^{2} (1.10 sq mi)
- Elevation: 206.1 m (676 ft)

Population (2002)
  - Total: 272

Sodinci (pronounced [ˈsoːdintsi]) is a settlement on the edge of the Slovene Hills northwest of Velika Nedelja in the Municipality of Ormož in northeastern Slovenia. The area traditionally belonged to the region of Styria. It is now included in the Drava Statistical Region.

There is a small roadside chapel with a belfry in the northern part of the settlement. It was built in the late 19th century.
