= Cirkovce =

- Location in Slovenia
- Coordinates: 46°23′41.03″N 15°43′37.33″E
- Country: Slovenia
- Traditional region: Styria
- Statistical region: Drava
- Municipality: Kidričevo

Area
  - Total: 4.47 km^{2} (1.73 sq mi)
- Elevation: 242.2 m (795 ft)

Population (2002)
  - Total: 403

Cirkovce (pronounced [ˈtsiːɾkɔu̯tsɛ], German: Zirkowetz) is a settlement in the Municipality of Kidričevo in northeastern Slovenia. It lies on the regional road from Kidričevo to Pragersko. The area is part of the traditional region of Styria. It is now included with the rest of the municipality in the Drava Statistical Region.

== Church ==
The parish church in the settlement is dedicated to the Assumption of Mary and belongs to the Roman Catholic Archdiocese of Maribor. Planned by Hans Pascher, it was built between 1904 and 1906 on the site of an earlier building mentioned in written documents dating to 1404.

== Notable people ==
Notable people that were born or lived in Cirkovce include:

- Davorin Beranič (1879–1923), beekeeper, philologist, and music historian
