= Podvinci =

- Location in Slovenia
- Coordinates: 46°25′46.35″N 15°54′55.41″E
- Country: Slovenia
- Traditional region: Styria
- Statistical region: Drava
- Municipality: Ptuj

Area
  - Total: 6.04 km^{2} (2.33 sq mi)
- Elevation: 225.4 m (740 ft)

Population (2002)
  - Total: 802

Podvinci (pronounced [ˈpoːdʋintsi]) is a village in the Municipality of Ptuj in northeastern Slovenia. It lies just northeast of Ptuj. The area is part of the traditional region of Styria. It is now included with the rest of the municipality in the Drava Statistical Region.
