= Kicar =

- Location in Slovenia
- Coordinates: 46°27′12.01″N 15°54′36.23″E
- Country: Slovenia
- Traditional region: Styria
- Statistical region: Drava
- Municipality: Ptuj

Area
  - Total: 2.49 km^{2} (0.96 sq mi)
- Elevation: 286.5 m (940 ft)

Population (2022)
  - Total: 887

Kicar (pronounced [ˈkiːtsaɾ]) is a settlement in the Municipality of Ptuj in northeastern Slovenia. The area is part of the traditional region of Styria. It is now included with the rest of the municipality in the Drava Statistical Region.
