= Zabovci =

- Location in Slovenia
- Coordinates: 46°23′58.77″N 15°55′1.1″E
- Country: Slovenia
- Traditional region: Styria
- Statistical region: Drava
- Municipality: Markovci

Area
  - Total: 4.58 km^{2} (1.77 sq mi)
- Elevation: 222.8 m (731 ft)

Population (2002)
  - Total: 407

Zabovci (pronounced [ˈzaːbɔu̯tsi]) is a settlement in the Municipality of Markovci in northeastern Slovenia. It lies just north of Lake Ptuj east of Ptuj. The area is part of the traditional region of Styria. It is now included with the rest of the municipality in the Drava Statistical Region.
