= Lake Ptuj =

Hydroelectric reservoir near Ptuj, Slovenia

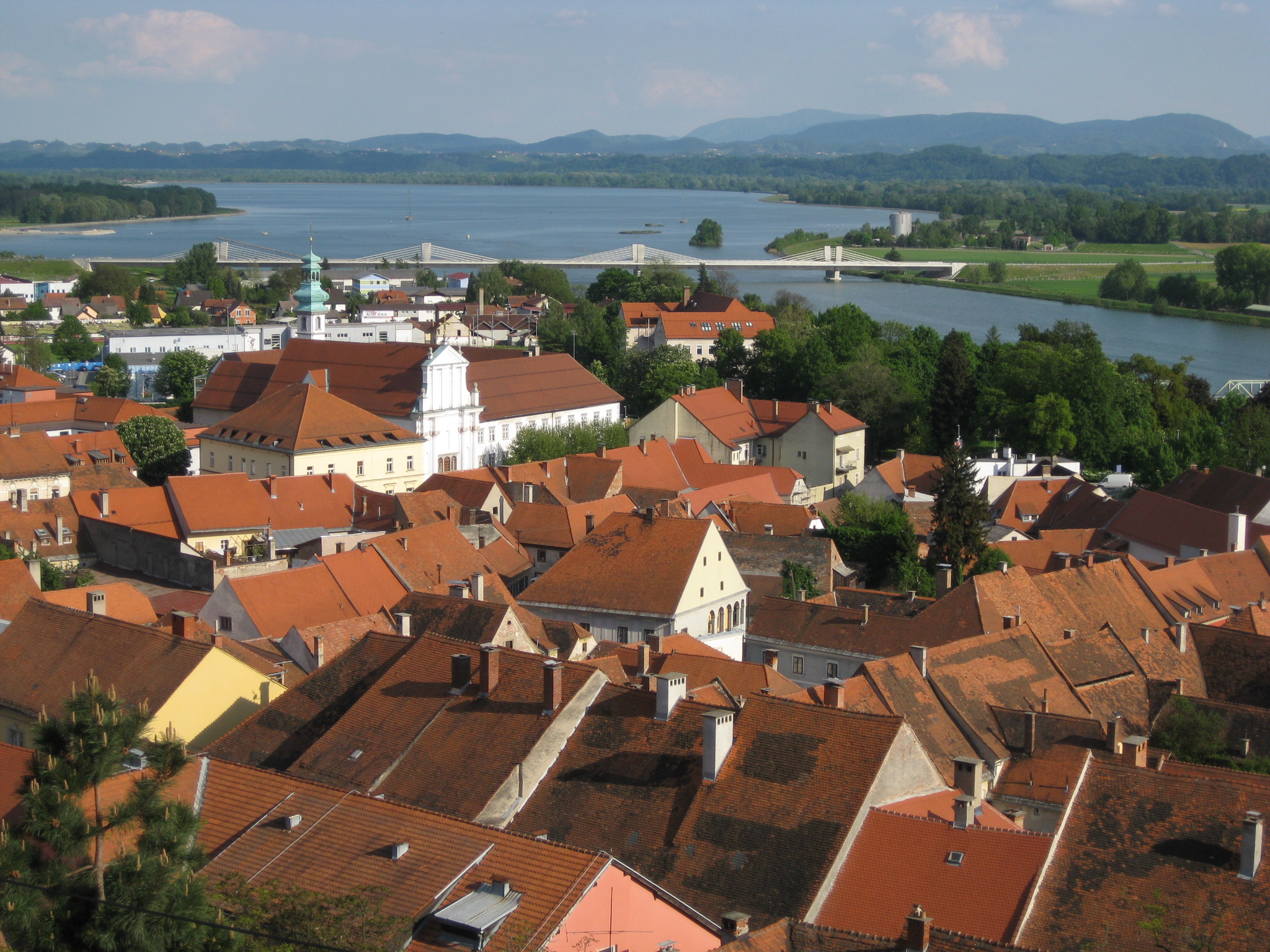
- Ptuj with Lake Ptuj in the background

- Location within Slovenia
- Location: Drava
- Coordinates: 46°24′7″N 15°53′36″E
- Basin countries: Slovenia
- Max. length: 5,500 m (18,000 ft)
- Max. width: 1,600 m (5,200 ft)
- Surface area: 3.5 km^{2} (1.4 sq mi)
- Max. depth: 12 m (39 ft)
- Water volume: 0.02 km^{3} (0.0048 cu mi)
- Surface elevation: 217.5 m (714 ft)
- Islands: 2
- Settlements: Ptuj

Lake Ptuj (pronounced [ˈptuːi̯]; Slovene: Ptujsko jezero) is a reservoir on the Drava River southeast of the town of Ptuj in eastern Slovenia. It is the largest reservoir in Slovenia and was created in 1978 when a dam for the Formin hydroelectric power plant was built on the Drava. It is still used as the reservoir for the power plant, but is also popular for rowing, sailing, and fishing.
