= Pobrežje, Videm =

Pobrežje
- Location in Slovenia
- Coordinates: 46°23′11.42″N 15°52′23.97″E
- Country: Slovenia
- Traditional region: Styria
- Statistical region: Drava
- Municipality: Videm

Area
  - Total: 6.21 km^{2} (2.40 sq mi)
- Elevation: 223.7 m (734 ft)

Population (2002)
  - Total: 835

Pobrežje (pronounced [ˈpoːbɾɛʒjɛ]) is a settlement south of Ptuj in the Municipality of Videm in eastern Slovenia. The area is part of the traditional region of Styria. It is now included in the Drava Statistical Region.

In fields around the settlement remains of Roman-era graves and a structure, probably a villa rustica, have been found. The extent of the site has yet to be determined.
