= Dornava =

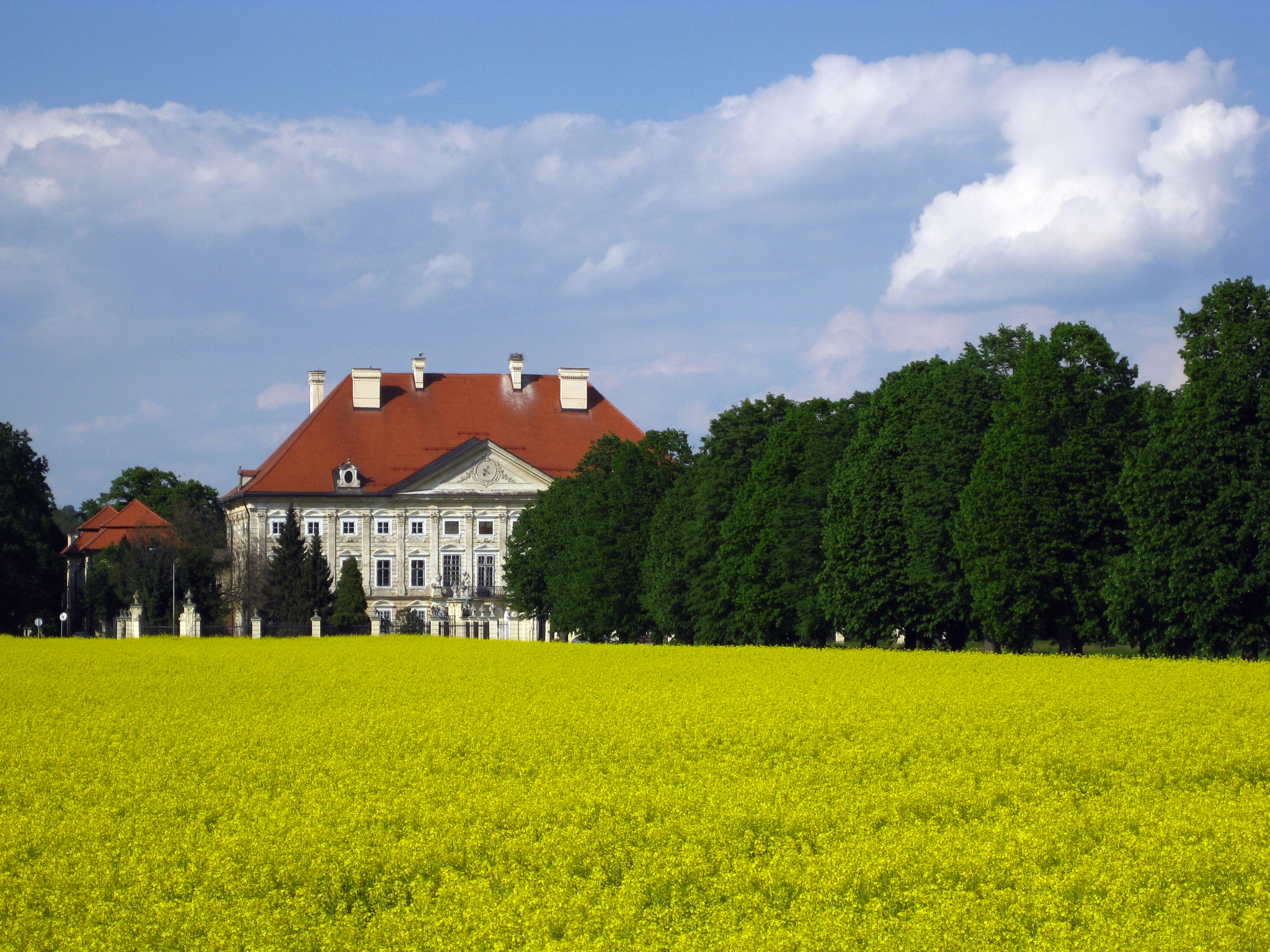
- Dornava Mansion

- Location in Slovenia
- Coordinates: 46°25′47.80″N 15°56′55.59″E
- Country: Slovenia
- Traditional region: Styria
- Statistical region: Drava
- Municipality: Dornava

Area
  - Total: 5.7 km^{2} (2.2 sq mi)
- Elevation: 218.6 m (717 ft)

Population (2020)
  - Total: 1,263
  - Density: 220/km^{2} (570/sq mi)

Dornava (pronounced [ˈdoːɾnaʋa], German: Dornau) is a settlement in the Municipality of Dornava in northeastern Slovenia. It is the seat of the municipality. It lies east of Ptuj, on the Pesnica River. The area is part of the traditional region of Styria. The municipality is now included in the Drava Statistical Region.

The parish church in the settlement is dedicated to Saint Dorothea and belongs to the Roman Catholic Archdiocese of Maribor. It was built 1519 and rebuilt in the early 18th century.

Dornava is best known for a large Baroque mansion north of the village. It was initially a castle in the 15th century, but after it was destroyed by fire in 1695 it was, it was bought by the Attems family from the Lords of Ptuj and entirely rebuilt around 1730. It is one of the best-preserved examples of a Baroque mansion in Slovenia.
