= Obara (stew) =

Slovene dish

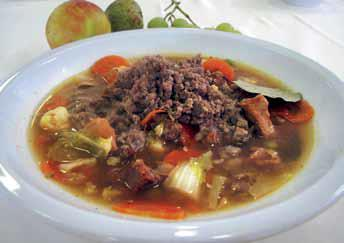
- Type: Stew
- Place of origin: Slovenia
- Main ingredients: Meat or offal (intestines) or vegetables

Obara (stew) is a Slovene national dish. It is a stew served as an independent meal, which is cooked from various kinds of meat and internal organs. It used to be served at various ceremonies, and it is a part of the traditional Slovenian cuisine. Especially good are obaras served with ajdovi žganci. Today obaras contain more vegetables.

One type of obara is dormouse stew from Inner Carniola in Slovenia. Report was made by Paolo Santonino, Cancellar of the Patriarch of Aquileia in his travel diary (1485-1487). He reports of a lunch stop in an Inner Carniola household, where the farmer's wife quickly prepared a roast dormouse for hungry archbishop. Roast dormice were also used for soups, risottos and goulashes. Dormouse hunting was not appreciated only for meat, but it also supplied the hunters with large amounts of dormouse fur. Dormouse lard was also useful for medicinal purposes. It was used for healing bruised or broken extremities, upset stomach and rheumatism.

== See also ==
- Slovenian cuisine
