= Laze (Ljubljana) =

- Location in Slovenia
- Coordinates: 46°1′34″N 14°42′06″E
- Country: Slovenia
- Traditional region: Upper Carniola
- Statistical region: Central Slovenia
- Municipality: Ljubljana
- Elevation: 424 m (1,391 ft)

Laze (pronounced [ˈxɾaːstjɛ]; German: Lase) is a formerly independent settlement in the southern part of Zgornja Besnica in central Slovenia. It is part of the traditional region of Upper Carniola and is now included with the rest of the municipality in the Central Slovenia Statistical Region.

== Geography ==
Laze is a dispersed settlement at the outflow of Aslivka Creek into Besnica Creek and extending into the adjacent hills. In addition to the part that was incorporated into Zgornja Besnica, part of it is now the hamlet of Laze in the neighboring settlement of Ravno Brdo.

== Name ==
The name Laze was originally an accusative plural of the masculine common noun laz 'grassy clearing', referring to a local landscape element. It was later reanalyzed as a feminine nominative plural. The settlement was known as Lase in German.

== History ==
Laze had a population of 84 living in 14 houses in 1869 and 124 living in 18 houses in 1890. Laze was annexed by Zgornja Besnica in the twentieth century, ending its existence as an independent settlement.
