= Javorje =

Javorje, derived from the word javor, meaning "maple", may refer to:

== Croatia ==
- Javorje, Zagreb County, a village near Brdovec
- Javorje, Primorje-Gorski Kotar County, a village near Novi Vinodolski

== Serbia ==
- Javorje (Vlasotince), village
- Javorje (Serbia), mountain in western Serbia

== Slovenia ==
- Javorje, Velike Lašče, a settlement in the Municipality of Velike Lašče
- Javorje, Črna na Koroškem, a settlement in the Municipality of Črna na Koroškem
- Javorje, Hrpelje-Kozina, a settlement in the Municipality of Hrpelje-Kozina
- Javorje pri Gabrovki, a settlement in the Municipality of Litija
- Javorje pri Blagovici, a settlement in the Municipality of Lukovica
- Javorje, Gorenja Vas–Poljane, a settlement in the Municipality of Gorenja Vas–Poljane
- Javorje (Slovenia), a mountain in the Kamnik–Savinja Alps

== See also ==
- Javor (disambiguation)
