= Javorník =

Javorník may refer to places in the Czech Republic:

- Javorník (Benešov District), a municipality and village in the Central Bohemian Region
- Javorník (Hodonín District), a municipality and village in the South Bohemian Region
- Javorník (Jeseník District), a town in the Olomouc Region
- Javorník (Svitavy District), a municipality and village in the Pardubice Region
- Javorník (Ústí nad Orlicí District), a municipality and village in the Pardubice Region
- Javorník, a village and part of Čtyřkoly in the Central Bohemian Region
- Javorník, a village and part of Proseč pod Ještědem in the Liberec Region
- Javorník, a village and part of Rudník (Trutnov District) in the Hradec Králové Region
- Javorník, a village and part of Vacov in the South Bohemian Region

== See also ==
- Javornik (disambiguation), the name of several locations in Croatia and Slovenia
- Jawornik (disambiguation), the name of several locations in Poland
- Jaworznik
- Javor (disambiguation)
