= Javornik =

Javornik, derived from the word "javor" (meaning "maple" in several South Slavic languages), may refer to:

Bosnia and Herzegovina

- Javornik, Vareš, a village in the Municipality of Vareš

Croatia

- Javornik, Croatia, a village located on the river Una, near the town of Dvor, Croatia
- Javornik, a mountain in the south of Lička Plješivica, Croatia

Slovenia

- Javornik, Idrija, a village in the Municipality of Idrija, western Slovenia
- Javornik, Kranj, a village in the City Municipality of Kranj, northwestern Slovenia
- Javornik, Štore, a village in the Municipality of Štore, eastern Slovenia
- Slovenski Javornik, commonly known as "Javornik", a village on the river Sava, near the town of Jesenice, Slovenia

== People with the surname ==
- Helena Javornik, a Slovenian long-distance runner
- Antonija Javornik (1893–1974), Serbian women soldier

== See also ==
- Javorník (disambiguation) (Czech form, with a diacritic í)
- Jawornik (disambiguation)
- Jaworznik
- Javor (disambiguation)
