= Aslivka =

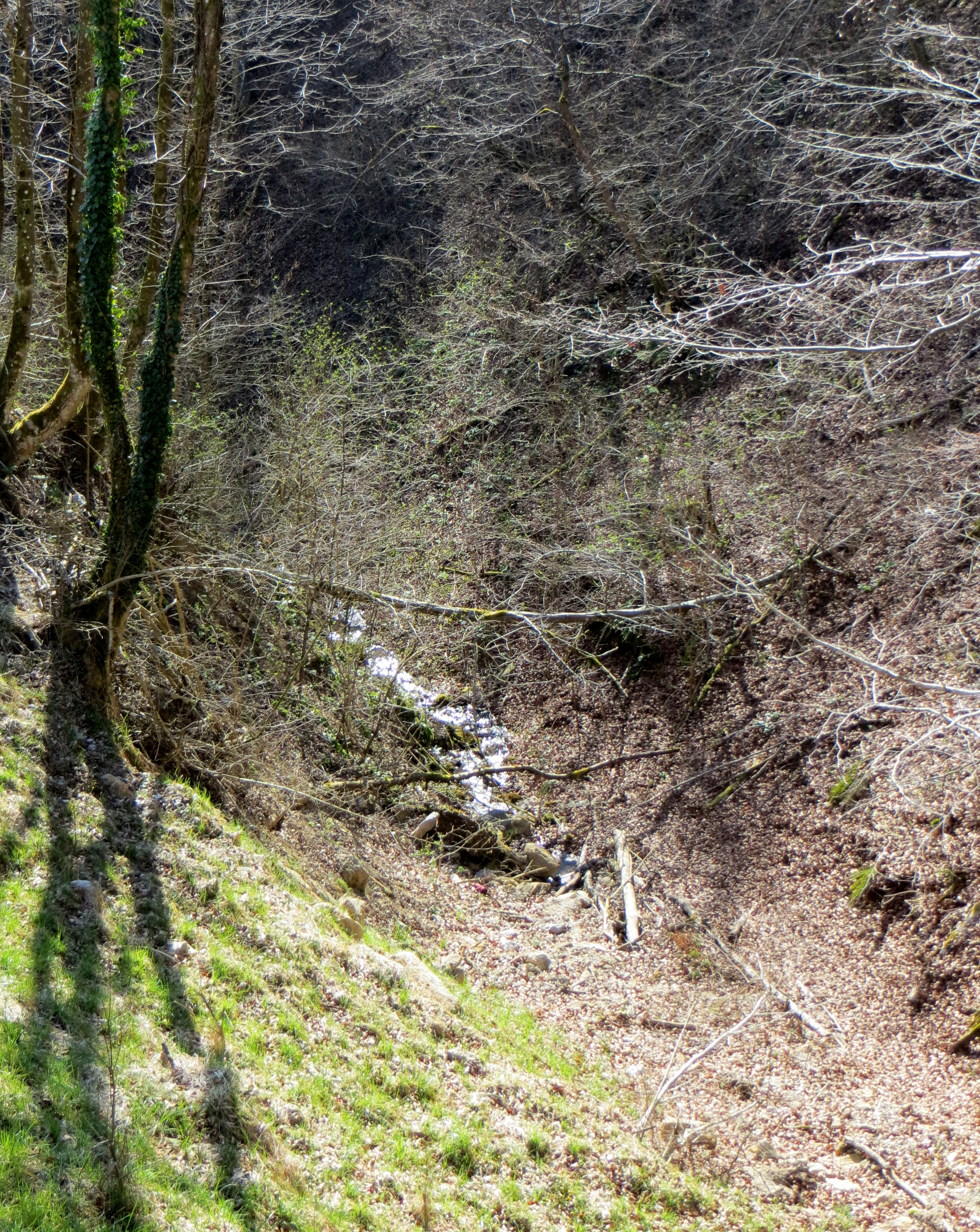
- Aslivka Creek in a ravine above Zgornja Besnica

Location
- Country: Slovenia

Physical characteristics
- Source
  - location: East of Javor
- Mouth
  - location: Besnica in Zgornja Besnica
  - coordinates: 46°1′33.83″N 14°42′5.04″E

Basin features
- Progression: Besnica→ Ljubljanica→ Sava→ Danube→ Black Sea

The Aslivka is a left tributary of Besnica Creek, which flows through the Besnica Valley east of Ljubljana and joins the Ljubljanica at Podgrad as its last right tributary just before it joins the Sava River.

== See also ==
- List of rivers of Slovenia
