= Besnica =

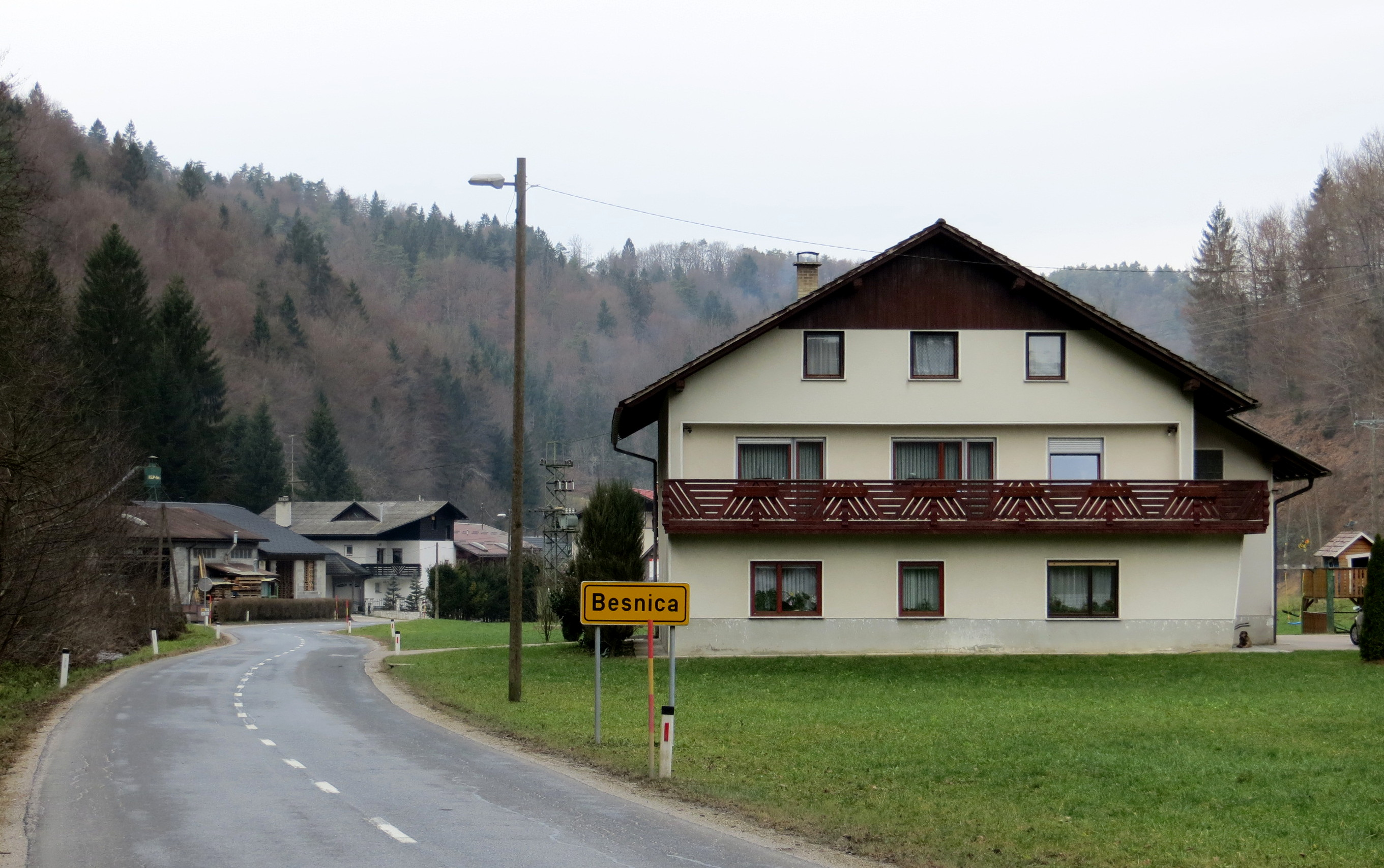

- Location in Slovenia
- Coordinates: 46°2′15.73″N 14°38′55.37″E
- Country: Slovenia
- Traditional region: Lower Carniola
- Statistical region: Central Slovenia
- Municipality: Ljubljana

Area
  - Total: 6.1 km^{2} (2.4 sq mi)
- Elevation: 338.3 m (1,110 ft)

Population (2015)
  - Total: 233
  - Density: 38/km^{2} (98/sq mi)
- Postal code: 1260

Besnica (pronounced [ˈbeːsnitsa]; German: Weßnitz) is a settlement in the hills east of the capital Ljubljana in central Slovenia. It belongs to the City Municipality of Ljubljana. It is part of the traditional region of Lower Carniola and is now included with the rest of the municipality in the Central Slovenia Statistical Region. The stream that runs through the settlement is also called the Besnica. It is a tributary of the Ljubljanica, which it joins at Podgrad. Besnica includes the hamlets of Derčar, Jančar, Pečar, Prek, Špan, and Tomaž.

== Name ==
The name Besnica is originally a hydronym that was later applied to the settlement along Besnica Creek. The name is derived from the Slavic adjective *běsьnъ 'rushing, swift', referring the character of the stream.

== History ==
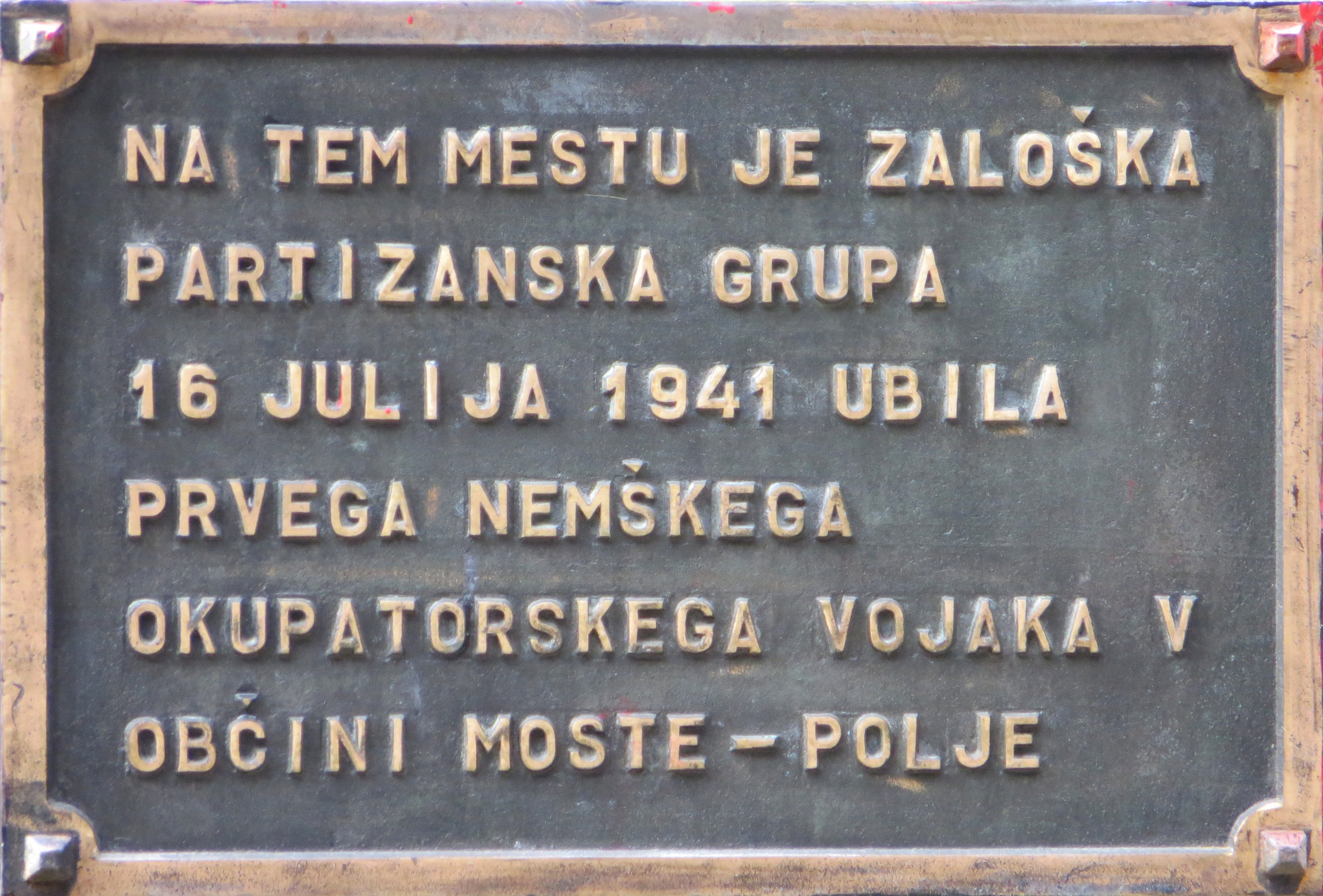
Plaque marking the site where the first German soldier was killed

Schooling was started in Besnica in 1939 in a private farmhouse; a school building was not built until 1954. Besnica is where the first German soldier fell in Slovenia during the Second World War on July 16, 1941. The spot is marked by a memorial. There is also a memorial plaque at house no. 23 in the village, where a Partisan soldier was killed on May 21, 1942.

== Cultural heritage ==
A small chapel in the settlement dates to the early 20th century.
