= Jawor (disambiguation) =

Jawor is a town and county seat in Lower Silesian Voivodeship, south-west Poland.

Jawor may also refer to the following places:

- Jawor, Góra County in Lower Silesian Voivodeship (south-west Poland)
- Jawor, Milicz County in Lower Silesian Voivodeship (south-west Poland)
- Jawor, Bełchatów County in Łódź Voivodeship (central Poland)
- Jawor, Opoczno County in Łódź Voivodeship (central Poland)
- Jawor, Gmina Solina in Subcarpathian Voivodeship (south-east Poland)
- Jawor (mountain) a mountain in Subcarpathian Voivodeship (south-east Poland)

== See also ==
- Jauer (disambiguation)
- Javor (disambiguation)
