= Javor =

Javor ("maple" in Slavic languages) may refer to:

== Places ==
- Javor, Albania, a settlement in Albania
- Javor, Busovača, a village in Bosnia and Herzegovina
- Javor (Kakanj), a village in Bosnia and Herzegovina
- Javor (Klatovy District), a municipality and village in the Czech Republic
- Javor, a village and part of Teplice nad Metují in the Czech Republic
- Javor, a village and part of Votice in the Czech Republic
- Javor, Iran, a village in Zanjan Province
- Javor, Ljubljana, a settlement in Slovenia
- Javor (Novi Pazar), a village in Serbia

== Mountains ==
- Javor (Bosnia and Herzegovina), a mountain in southeastern Bosnia and Herzegovina, near Nevesinje
- Javor (Serbia), a mountain in western Serbia

== People ==
- Benedek Jávor (born 1972), Hungarian biologist, environmentalist and politician
- Javor Mills (born 1979), American former National Football League player

== Other uses ==
- FK Javor Ivanjica, a Serbian football club based in Ivanjica

== See also ==
- Jawor (disambiguation), Polish cognate
- Javornik (disambiguation)
- Javorje (disambiguation)
