= Javor, Ljubljana =

Javor
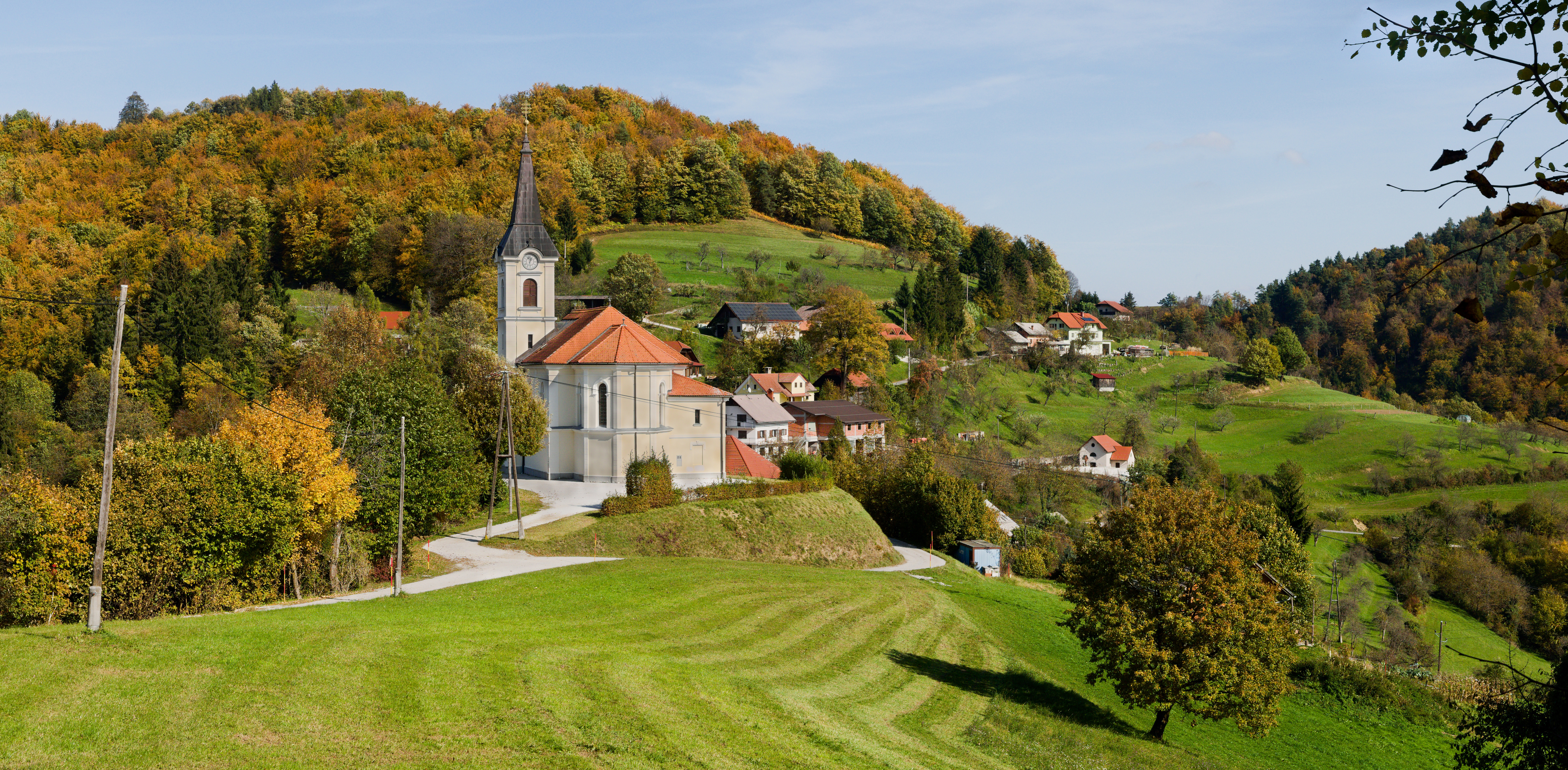
- Javor

- Location in Slovenia
- Coordinates: 46°1′13.19″N 14°40′38.98″E
- Country: Slovenia
- Traditional region: Lower Carniola
- Statistical region: Central Slovenia
- Municipality: Ljubljana

Area
  - Total: 6.21 km^{2} (2.40 sq mi)
- Elevation: 514.8 m (1,689 ft)

Population (2002)
  - Total: 170
- Postal code: 1261

Javor (pronounced [ˈjaːʋɔɾ]) is a settlement in central Slovenia. It lies in the hills east of the capital Ljubljana and belongs to the City Municipality of Ljubljana. It is part of the traditional region of Lower Carniola and is now included, with the rest of the municipality, in the Central Slovenia Statistical Region. In addition to the main settlement, it also includes the hamlets of Brezovar, Lanišče, Roje, Žagarski Vrh (Slovene: Žagarski vrh), Zavrharji, and Sevšek.

== Geography ==
Aslivka Creek rises east of the village, and then flows east to join Besnica Creek in Zgornja Besnica.

== Name ==
Javor and names like it (e.g., Javornik, Javorje, etc.) are derived from the Slovene common noun javor 'maple', thus referring to the local vegetation.

== History ==
Archaeological evidence attests to the early settlement of the area: above the village there is a flat Hallstatt burial site, which also contains Roman-era graves. There are prehistoric burial mounds located south of this. At Žagar Peak (Slovene: Žagarski vrh), northwest of the main settlement, the microtoponym Na grmadi (literally, 'at the bonfire') is a reference to the bonfires that were lit as warnings during Ottoman attacks. A school was established in Javor in 1894, but classes were only offered on Sundays. A part-time school was established in 1901, and a full-time school in 1928. Lessons were held in a private house until a schoolhouse was built in 1941. Around 1950, two extensive military bunkers were built near the village.

== Church ==
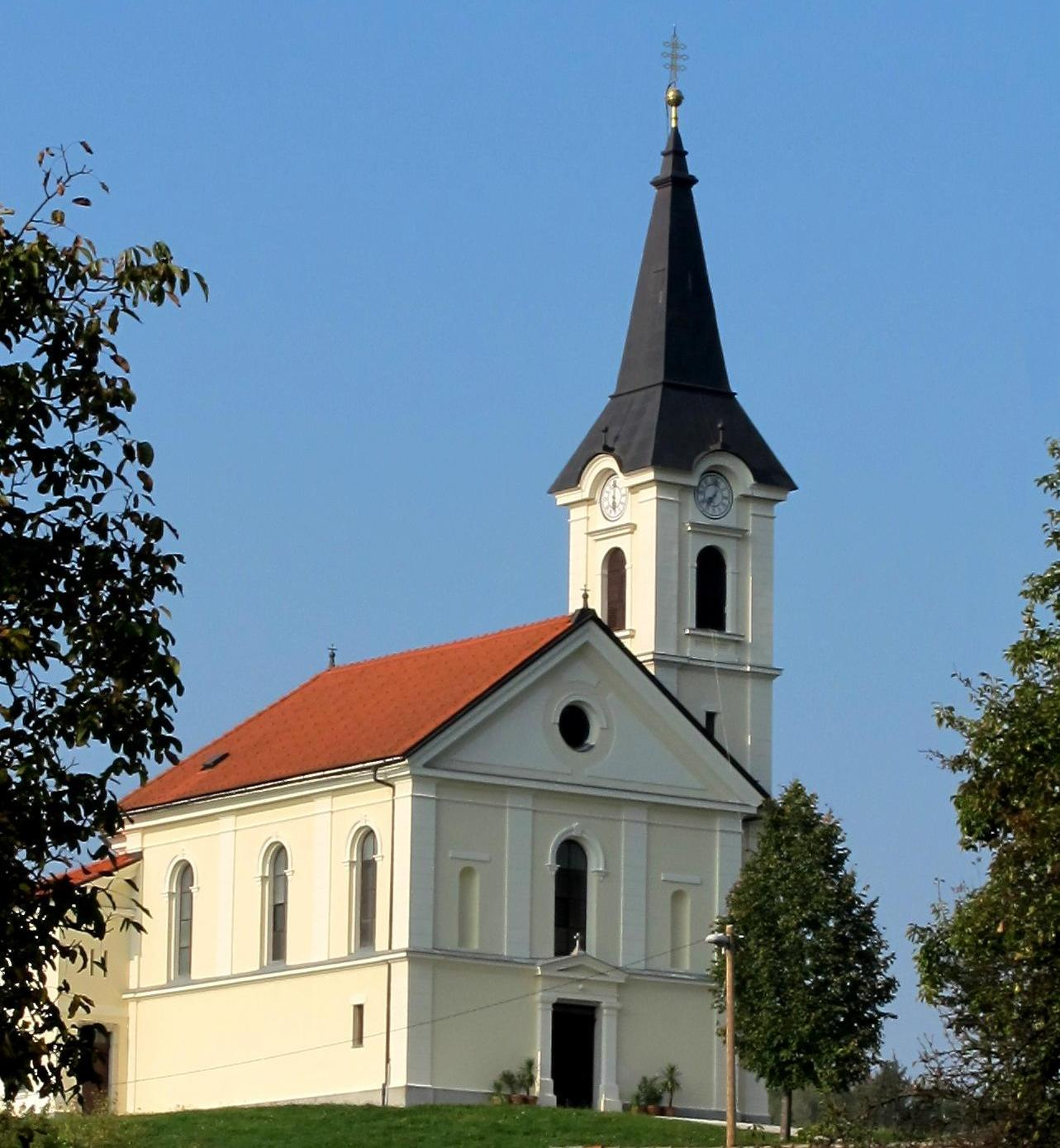
Saint Anne's Church

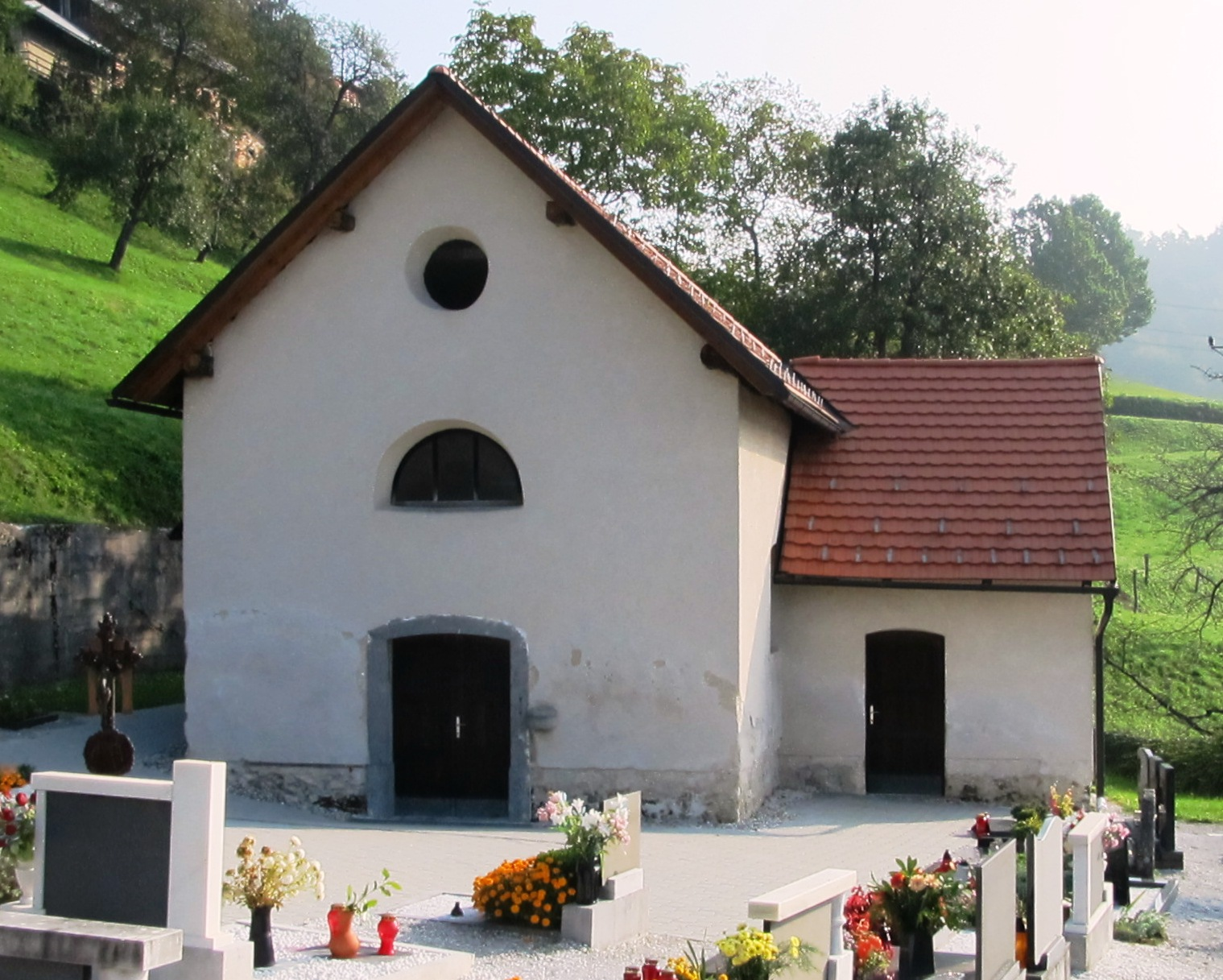
Cemetery chapel (former church)

Church and chapel in Javor

The local parish church is dedicated to Saint Anne and belongs to the Roman Catholic Archdiocese of Ljubljana. The church was built between 1906 and 1908. The former village church now serves as the chapel at the nearby cemetery, and it was first mentioned in written sources in 1526. The cemetery chapel is dedicated to Saint Martin. Javor was made the seat of a parish in 1906.

== Cultural heritage ==
In addition to Saint Anne's Church and the cemetery chapel, several other structures in Javor have protected cultural monument status:

- The farm at Javor no. 14 consists of a farmhouse with a cellar dating from the last quarter of the 19th century. It has a facade decorated with geometric patterns and tendril ornamentation. There is a stone staircase in the courtyard, and next to the house there is a hayrack with extensive carvings.

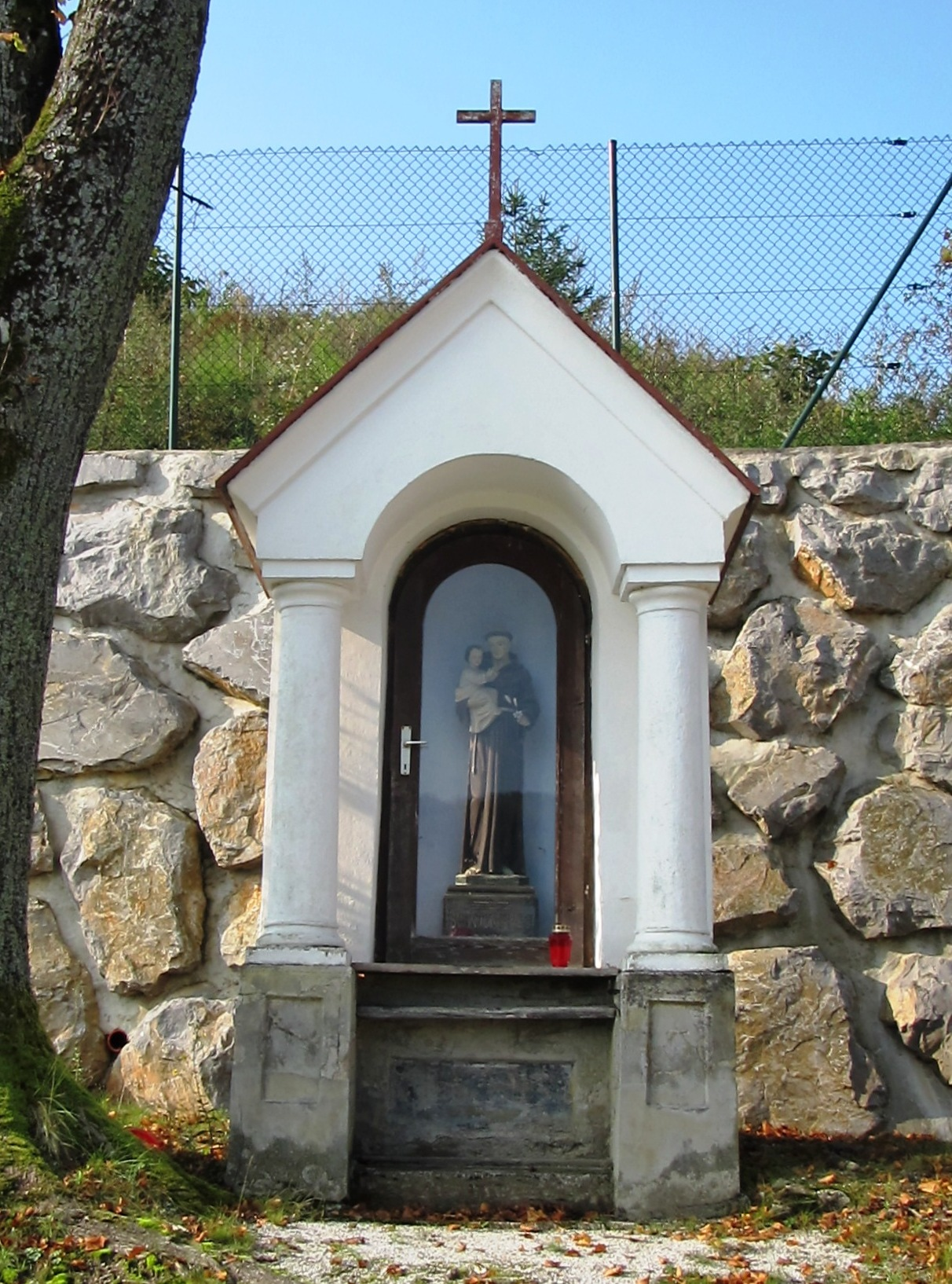
Chapel-shrine in Javor

- There is a chapel-shrine set against a wall southwest of the church. The shrine contains a statue of Saint Francis.
- An Iron Age graveyard is located in the settlement, and the site also contains burials from antiquity. There is a prehistoric tumulus burial site in the nearby woods that has been partially studied.
- The rectory in the village is a two-story structure. The year 1820 is carved into the door frame, and the plastering segments the facade in a historicist style. The corners of the building feature quoining. There is a small barn with a cellar next to the rectory; it was built in the early 20th century on an older foundation.
- The village core is a typical example of a clustered village, consisting of Saint Martin's Chapel in the cemetery, a school, old two-story farmhouses with barns dating from the 19th century, and Saint Anne's Church.
- The general area of the settlement has been recognized as a cultural landscape, consisting of scattered hamlets and isolated farms on ridges surrounded by agricultural terraces.
