= Jauer =

Jauer may refer to:

- Jauer (river), a river in Saxony, Germany
- Jauer dialect, a dialect of the Romansh language spoken in the Val Müstair, Graubünden, Switzerland
- Georg Jauer (1896–1971), German World War II general
- Nicholas Magni (c. 1355–1435), also known as Nikolaus Groß von Jauer, medieval theologian

== See also ==
- Jauerfood, a Danish company
- Jawor (German: Jauer), a town in Poland
- Duchy of Jawor (German: Herzogtum Schweidnitz-Jauer), a former principality of the Holy Roman Empire, now part of Poland
