= Jawornik =

Jawornik may refer to the following places:

- Jawornik, Lesser Poland Voivodeship (south Poland)
- Jawornik, Sanok County in Subcarpathian Voivodeship (south-east Poland)
- Jawornik, Strzyżów County in Subcarpathian Voivodeship (south-east Poland)

== See also ==
- Javornik (disambiguation)
- Javorník (disambiguation) (with diacritical mark)
