= Javorje, Gorenja Vas–Poljane =

Javorje
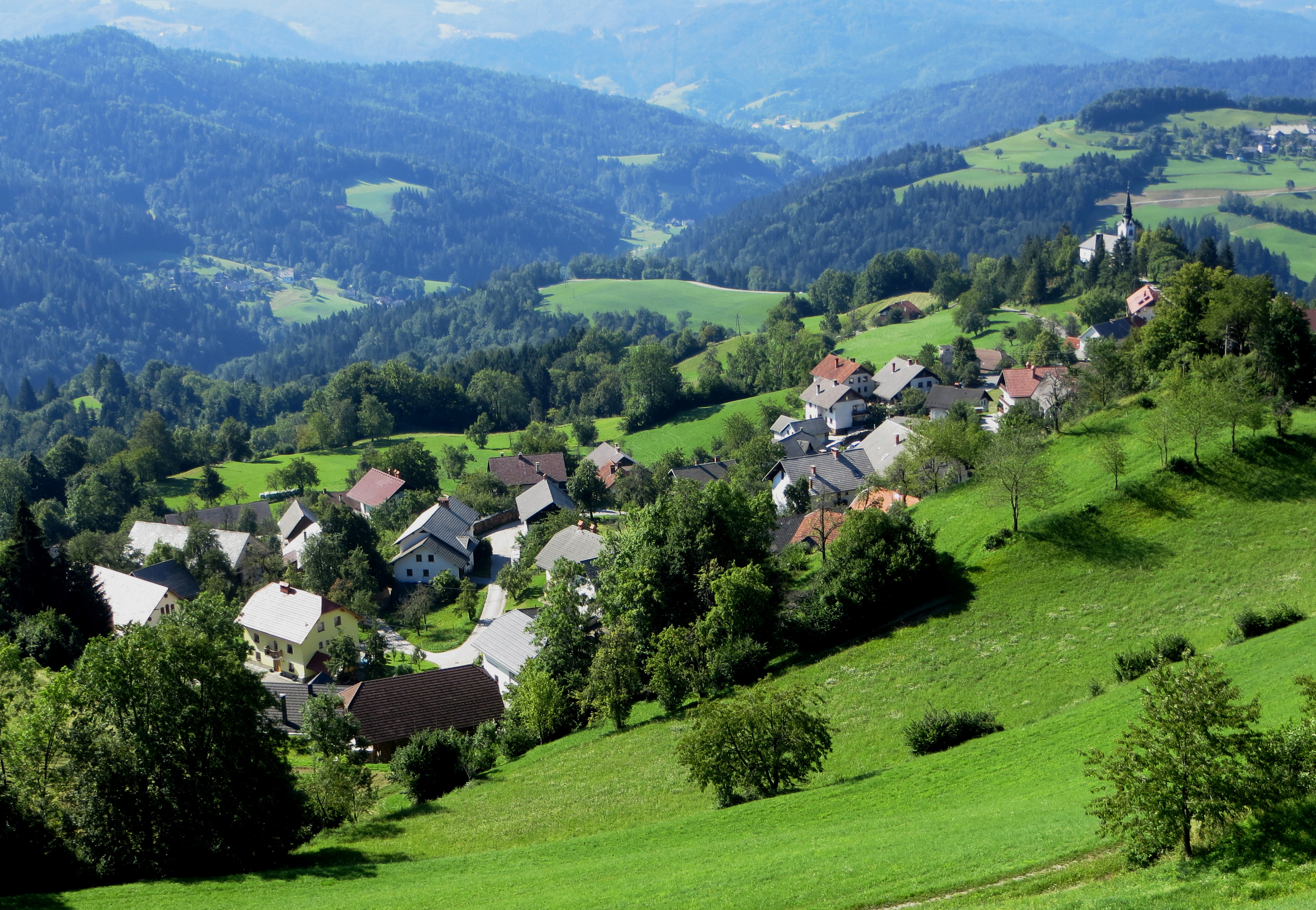

- Location in Slovenia
- Coordinates: 46°9′34.06″N 14°10′40.55″E
- Country: Slovenia
- Traditional region: Upper Carniola
- Statistical region: Upper Carniola
- Municipality: Gorenja Vas–Poljane

Area
  - Total: 2.57 km^{2} (0.99 sq mi)
- Elevation: 721.3 m (2,366 ft)

Population (2020)
  - Total: 202
  - Density: 78.6/km^{2} (204/sq mi)

Javorje (pronounced [ˈjaːʋɔɾjɛ]; German: Afriach) is a village in the hills between the Selca Sora and the Poljane Sora valleys in the Municipality of Gorenja Vas–Poljane in the Upper Carniola region of Slovenia.

== Name ==
Javorje and names like it (e.g., Javor, Javornik, etc.) are derived from the Slovene common noun javor 'maple', thus referring to the local vegetation. In the past the village was known as Afriach in German.

== History ==
The remnants of a Roman aqueduct have been found in the area, testifying to early settlement. Javorje was the seat of a parish under the medieval Dominion of Freising. During the Second World War, a Partisan attack in October 1943 resulted in the withdrawal of a German police unit from the village. The schoolhouse in Javorje was burned by German forces. In 1944 and 1945 the Partisans operated a school in the village rectory. During an engagement on 7 February 1945, several houses in the village were burned.

== Javorje meteorite ==
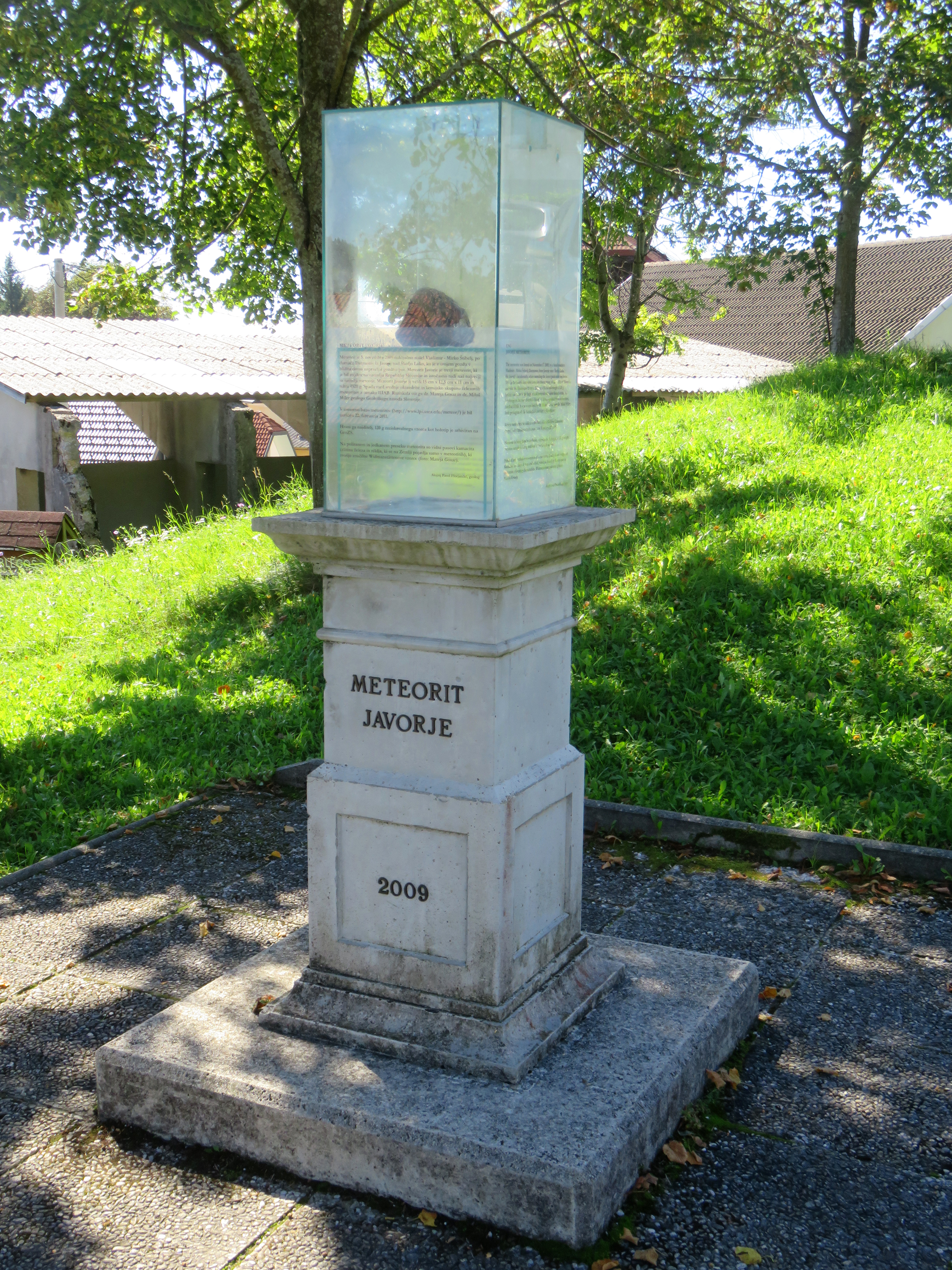
Display case

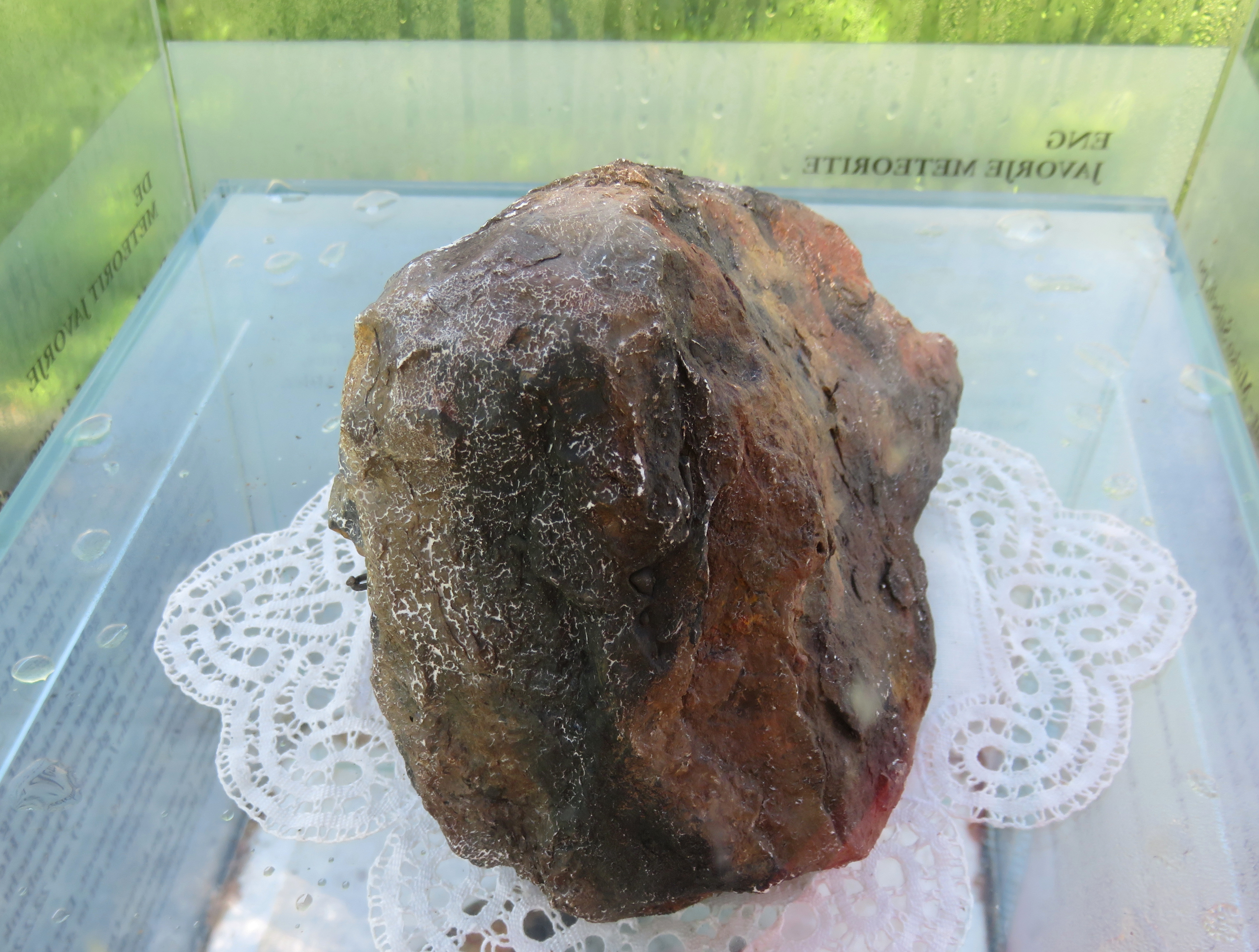
The meteorite

The Javorje meteorite

On November 5, 2009, a meteorite was found in Javorje during work on a forest road. It measures 15 by 12.5 by 11 centimeters (5.9 in × 4.9 in × 4.3 in) and weighs 4,920 grams (174 oz). It is a coarse-grained iron meteorite containing stripes of kamacite forming Widmanstätten patterns.

== Church ==
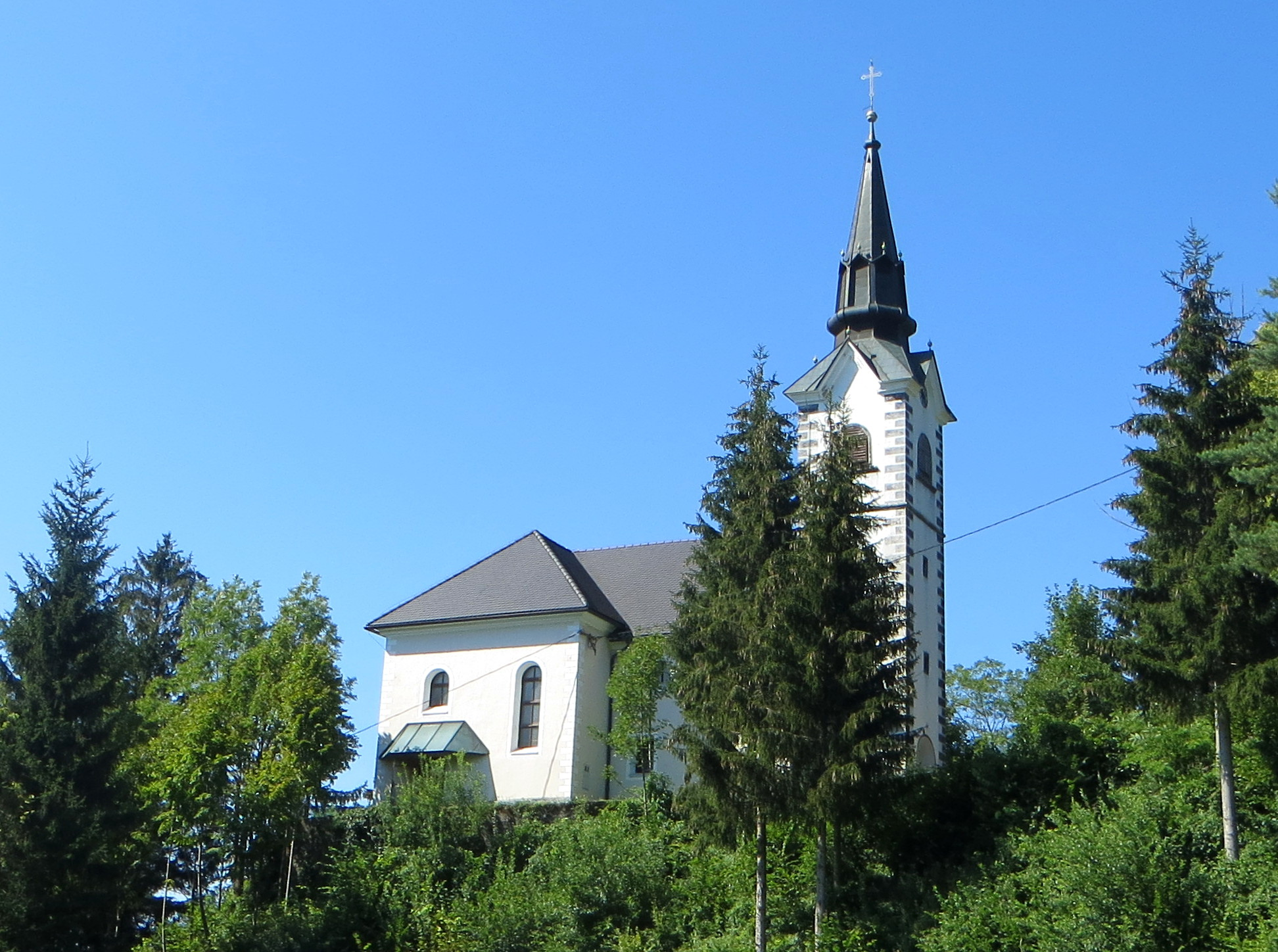
Saint Giles's Church

The local church is dedicated to Saint Giles (Slovene: sveti Tilen). It was originally a Gothic church with an angled apse. Around 1710 it was made taller and renovated in the baroque style. The belfry is from the 16th century. The church was again widened and extended in the 1920s. The three altars are from the late 19th century. The paintings in the church are by Janez Šubic, the altar is the work of Štefan Šubic, and the Stations of the Cross are by Leopold Layer. The village chapel shrine, which contains a Gothic Pietà from 1440, was painted with frescoes by Štefan Šubic in 1861.

== Notable people ==
Notable people that were born or lived in Javorje include:

- Luka Jeran (1818–1896), poet, editor of Zgodnja danica, and proponent of the Illyrian movement

== Gallery ==
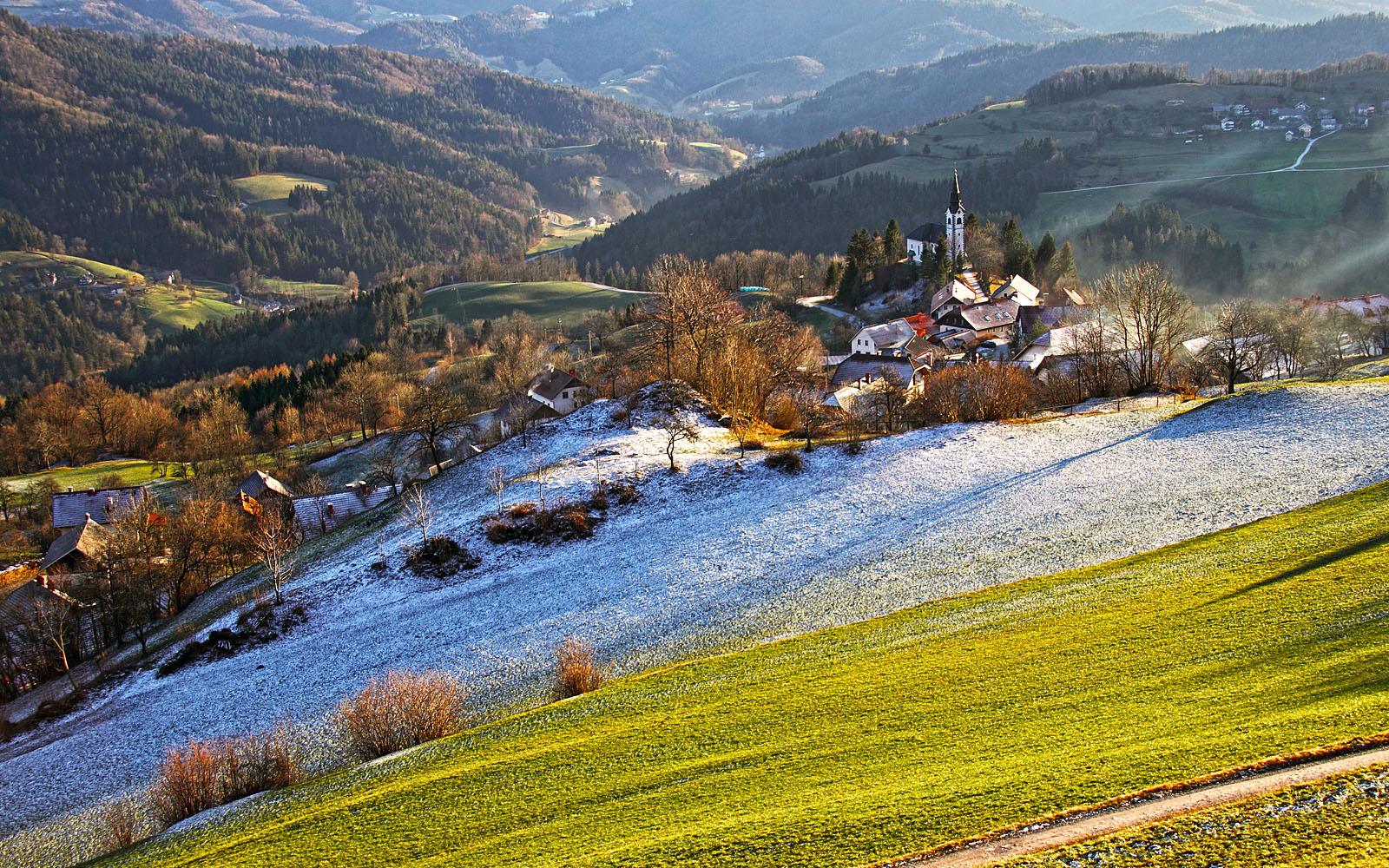
Afternoon in Javorje
