= Zgornja Besnica, Ljubljana =

Zgornja Besnica
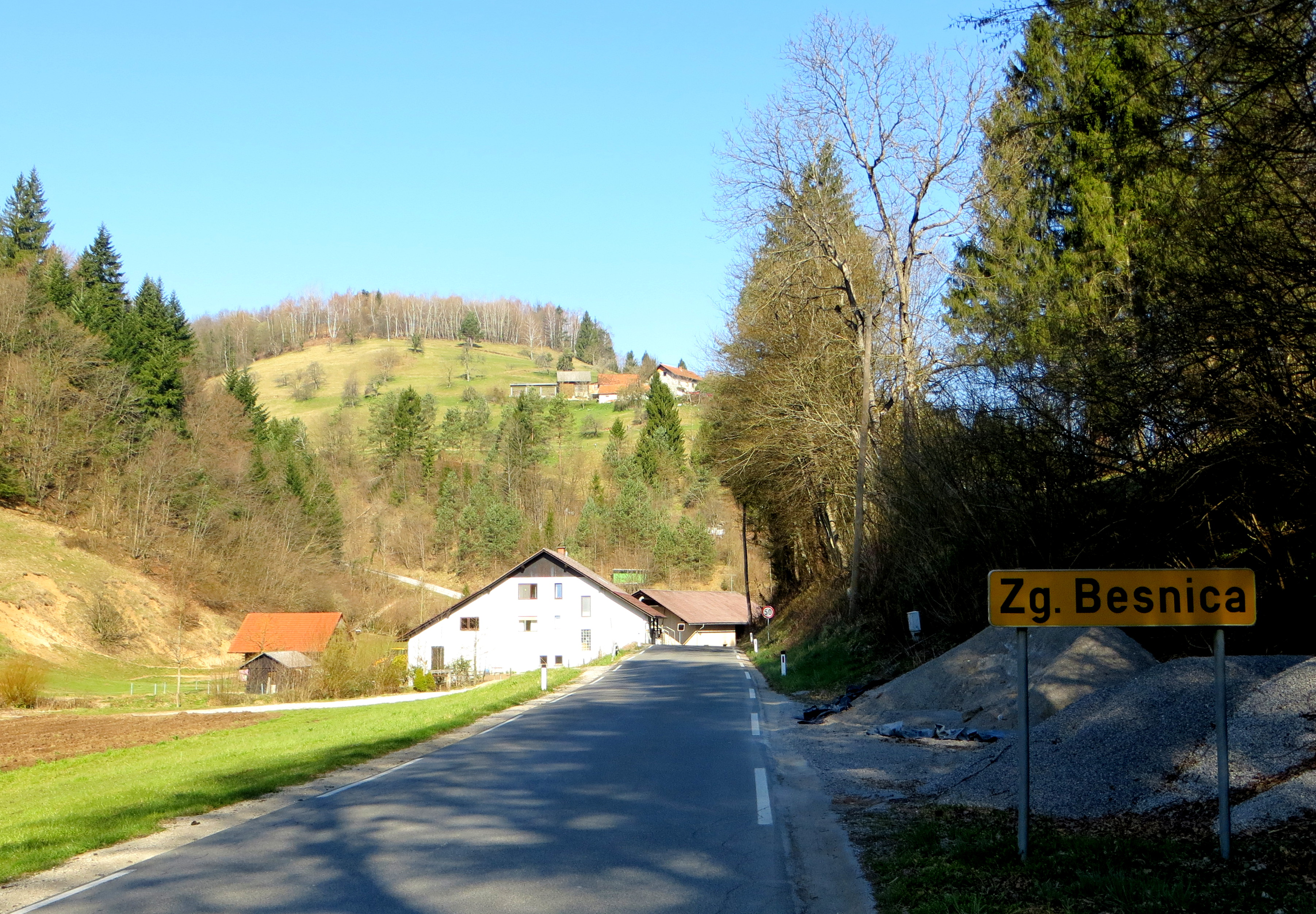

- Location in Slovenia
- Coordinates: 46°1′59.95″N 14°41′18.24″E
- Country: Slovenia
- Traditional region: Lower Carniola
- Statistical region: Central Slovenia
- Municipality: Ljubljana

Area
  - Total: 2.53 km^{2} (0.98 sq mi)
- Elevation: 399.9 m (1,312 ft)

Population (2002)
  - Total: 108
- Postal code: 1000

Zgornja Besnica (pronounced [ˈzɡoːɾnja ˈbeːsnitsa]) is a settlement in central Slovenia. It lies in the hills east of the capital Ljubljana and belongs to the City Municipality of Ljubljana. It is part of the traditional Lower Carniola region. It is now included with the rest of the municipality in the Central Slovenia Statistical Region.

== Geography ==
Aslivka Creek rises west of the village, below Javor, and then flows east to join Besnica Creek in Zgornja Besnica.
