= Jauerfood =

Jauerfood was a company that supplied East German residents with food paid for by friends and relatives in the West or by East German residents' West German bank accounts. It was founded in 1956 in Copenhagen, Denmark, by Gunnar Jauer.

== History ==
Beginning in 1959, East Germany did not allow its citizens to withdraw their funds from accounts held in West German banks, hence many East Germany citizens had substantial savings that they could not utilize. Jauerfood (and the Zürich-based company Palatinus) made an agreement with the East German Trade association Genex to export goods to East Germany, in return for a 5% commission to Genex.

Through the 1960s, 1970s, and 1980s, the trade grew. In 1988, just prior to the fall of the Berlin Wall, Jauerfood's gross earnings were approximately US$175,000,000. 1988 was the final year the company was fully operational. By the end of 1989, Cold War had ended and the company's reason for being had vanished.
