= Javornik, Vareš =

Village in Vareš, Bosnia and Herzegovina

Javornik
- Village
- Location within Bosnia and Herzegovina
- Coordinates: 44.1839126°N 18.345516°E
- Country: Bosnia and Herzegovina
- Entity: Federation of Bosnia and Herzegovina
- Canton: Zenica-Doboj
- Municipality: Vareš

Area
  - Total: 2.09 sq mi (5.41 km^{2})

Population (2013)
  - Total: 95
  - Density: 45/sq mi (18/km^{2})
- Time zone: UTC+1 (CET)
  - Summer (DST): UTC+2 (CEST)

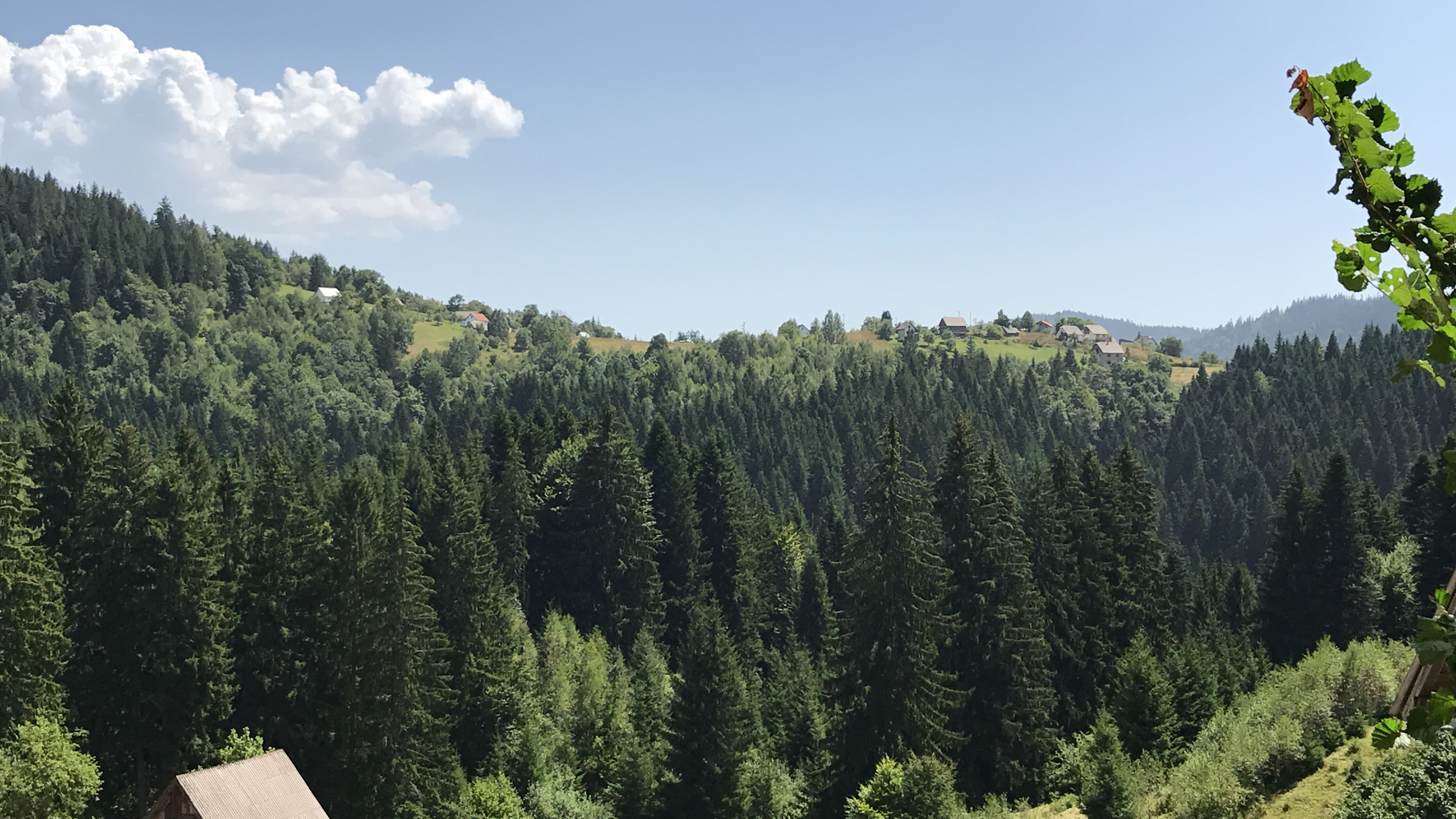
View of Javornik

Javornik is a village in the municipality of Vareš, Bosnia and Herzegovina.

== Demographics ==
According to the 2013 census, its population was 95.

Ethnicity in 2013
Ethnicity	Number	Percentage
Croats	94	98.9%
other/undeclared	1	1.1%
Total	95	100%
