= Jauer (river) =

River in Germany

Jauer Jawora
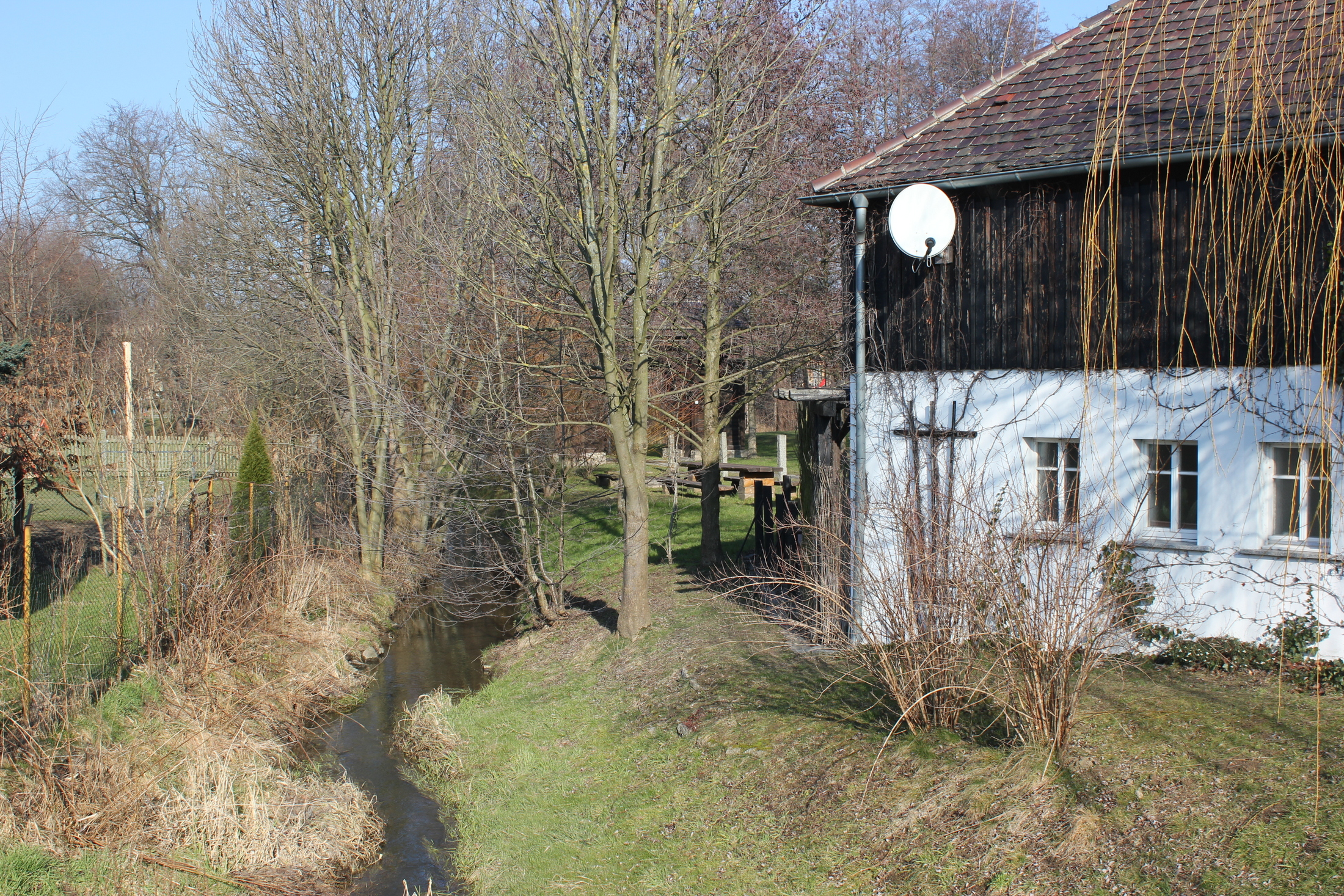

Location
- Country: Germany
- States: Saxony
- Towns: Kamenz, Nebelschütz, Panschwitz-Kuckau

Physical characteristics
- Source: Kaschwitz
  - coordinates: 51.207341°N 14.169579°E
  - elevation: 248 m
- Mouth
  - location: Schwarze Elster
  - coordinates: 51.30857°N 14.14565°E
  - elevation: 144 m
- Length: 14 km (8.7 mi)

Basin features
- Progression: Black Elster→ Elbe→ North Sea
- GKZ: 538114

The Jauer is a river of Saxony, Germany. It is a right tributary of the Schwarze Elster, which it joins near Kamenz.

== See also ==
- List of rivers of Saxony
