= Javorje, Velike Lašče =

Javorje
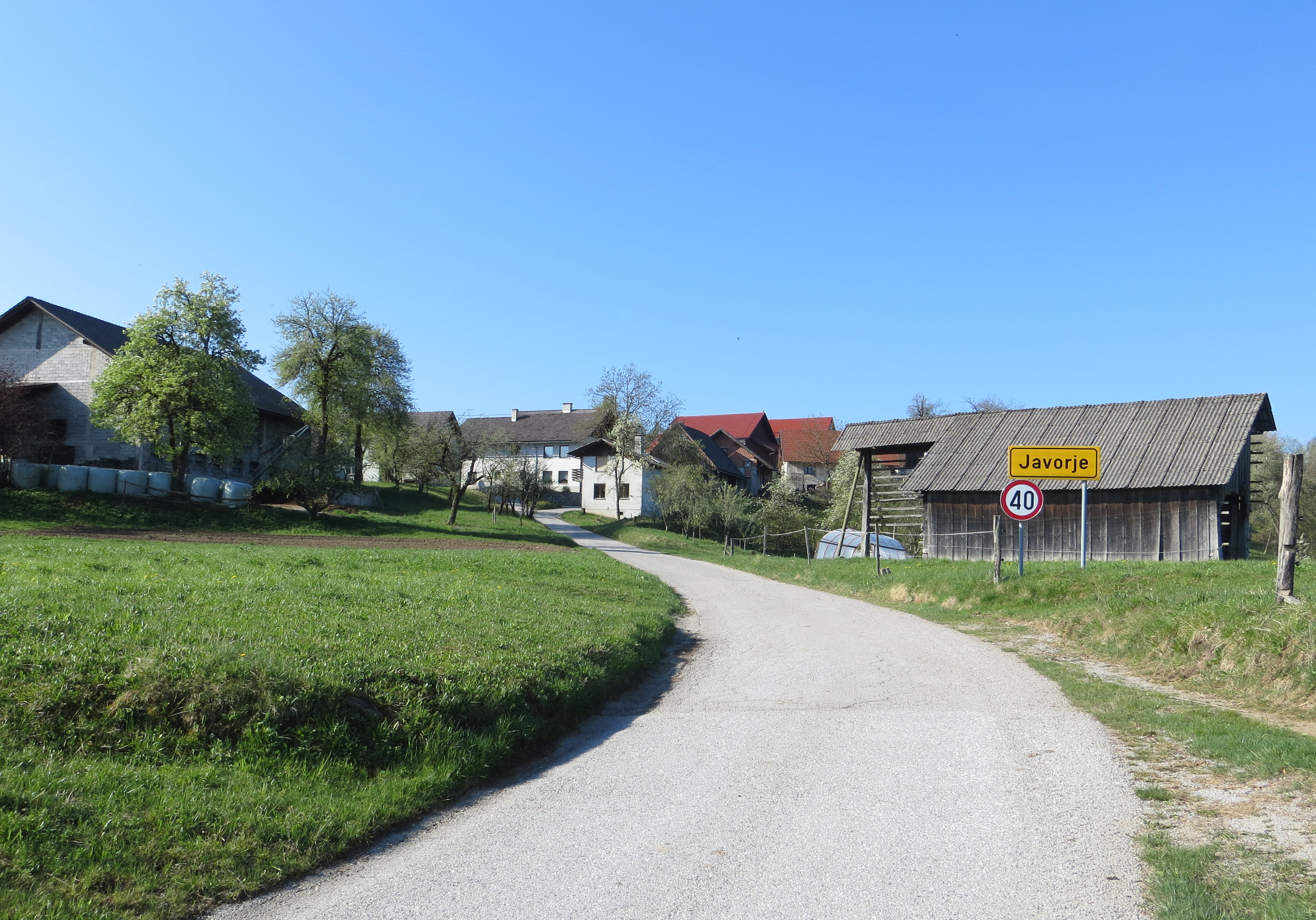

- Location in Slovenia
- Coordinates: 45°51′48.35″N 14°35′55.24″E
- Country: Slovenia
- Traditional region: Lower Carniola
- Statistical region: Central Slovenia
- Municipality: Velike Lašče

Area
  - Total: 0.83 km^{2} (0.32 sq mi)
- Elevation: 537.2 m (1,762 ft)

Population (2002)
  - Total: 13
- Postal code: 1311

Javorje (pronounced [ˈjaːʋɔɾjɛ]) is a small settlement southwest of Turjak in the Municipality of Velike Lašče in central Slovenia. The area is part of the traditional region of Lower Carniola and is now included in the Central Slovenia Statistical Region.
