= Vacov =

- Municipality
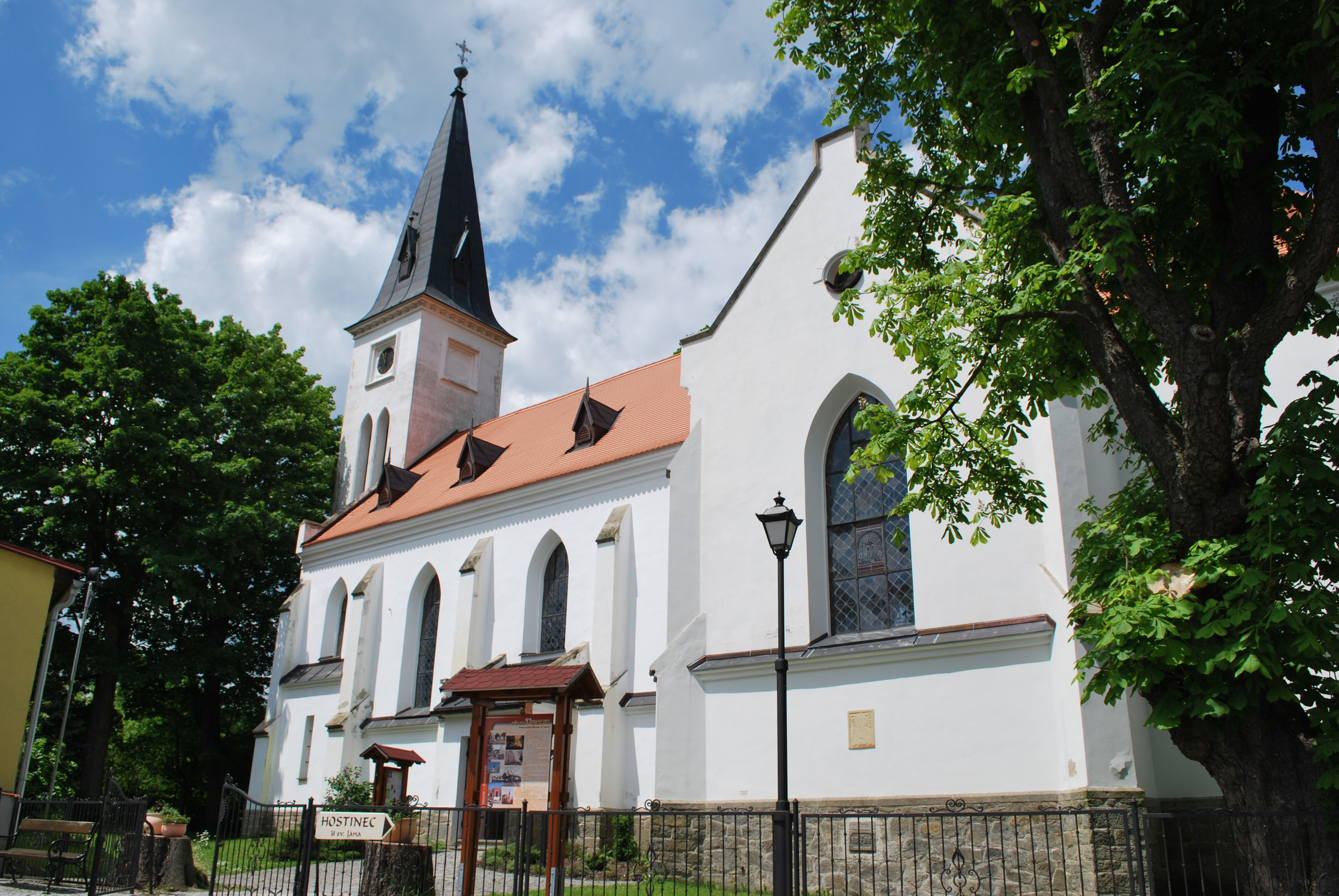
- Church of Saint Nicholas

- Flag Coat of arms

- Location in the Czech Republic
- Coordinates: 49°8′10″N 13°43′47″E
- Country: Czech Republic
- Region: South Bohemian
- District: Prachatice
- First mentioned: 1193

Area
  - Total: 35.21 km^{2} (13.59 sq mi)
- Elevation: 732 m (2,402 ft)

Population (2026-01-01)
  - Total: 1,430
  - Density: 40.6/km^{2} (105/sq mi)
- Time zone: UTC+1 (CET)
  - Summer (DST): UTC+2 (CEST)
- Postal codes: 384 73, 384 86
- Website: www.vacov.cz

Vacov (Czech pronunciation: [ˈvatsof]) is a municipality and village in Prachatice District in the South Bohemian Region of the Czech Republic. It has about 1,400 inhabitants.

== Administrative division ==
Vacov consists of 14 municipal parts (in brackets population according to the 2021 census):

- Vacov (125)
- Benešova Hora (122)
- Čábuze (45)
- Javorník (156)
- Lhota nad Rohanovem (40)
- Milíkov (7)
- Miřetice (95)
- Mladíkov (16)
- Nespice (62)
- Přečín (121)
- Ptákova Lhota (0)
- Rohanov (78)
- Vlkonice (500)
- Žár (96)

== Etymology ==
The name Vacov is derived from the personal name Vác or Váca (shortened forms of Václav), meaning "Vác's/Váca's (court, property)".

== Geography ==
Vacov is located about 23 kilometres (14 mi) northwest of Prachatice and 56 km (35 mi) northwest of České Budějovice. It lies in the Bohemian Forest Foothills. The highest point is the mountain Javorník at 1,066 m (3,497 ft) above sea level. The Spůlka Stream flows through the southern part of the municipality.

== History ==
The first written mention of Vacov is from 1193.

== Demographics ==
Historical population

Year	Pop.	±%
1869	3,453	—
1880	3,746	+8.5%
1890	3,920	+4.6%
1900	4,097	+4.5%
1910	4,258	+3.9%

Year	Pop.	±%
1921	3,784	−11.1%
1930	3,324	−12.2%
1950	2,364	−28.9%
1961	2,275	−3.8%
1970	1,934	−15.0%

Year	Pop.	±%
1980	1,673	−13.5%
1991	1,445	−13.6%
2001	1,354	−6.3%
2011	1,398	+3.2%
2021	1,463	+4.6%

Source: Censuses

== Transport ==
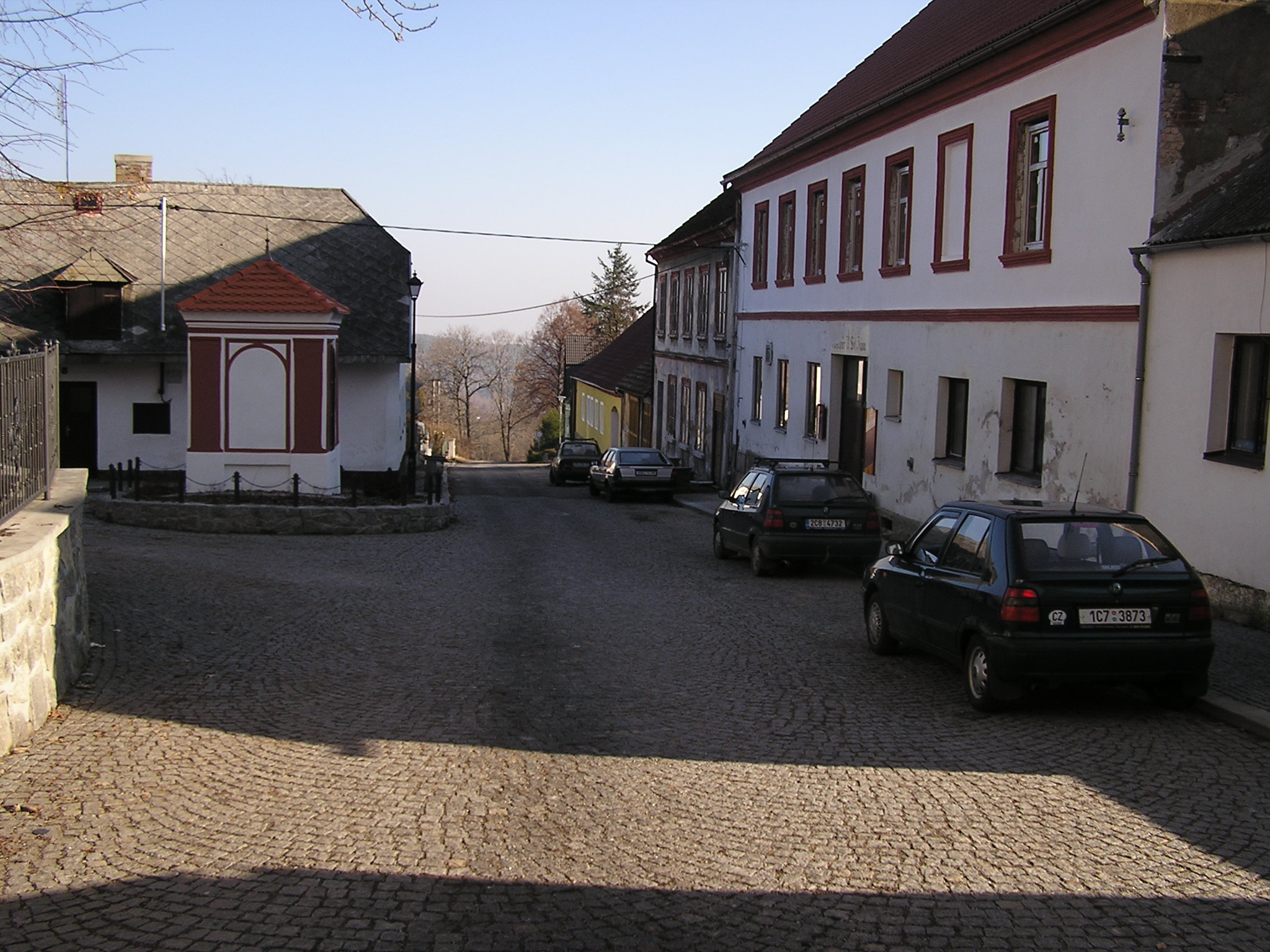
An old street in the centre of Vacov with the Chapel of Saint John of Nepomuk

There are no railways or major roads passing through the municipality.

== Sights ==
The main landmark is the Church of Saint Nicholas. It was built in the pseudo-Gothic style in 1889–1890, after the old church was demolished. Next to the church stands the Chapel of Saint John of Nepomuk from the 18th century.

== Notable people ==
- Matěj Kopecký (1775–1847), puppeteer; lived in Přečín in 1836–1847
