= Javorje pri Gabrovki =

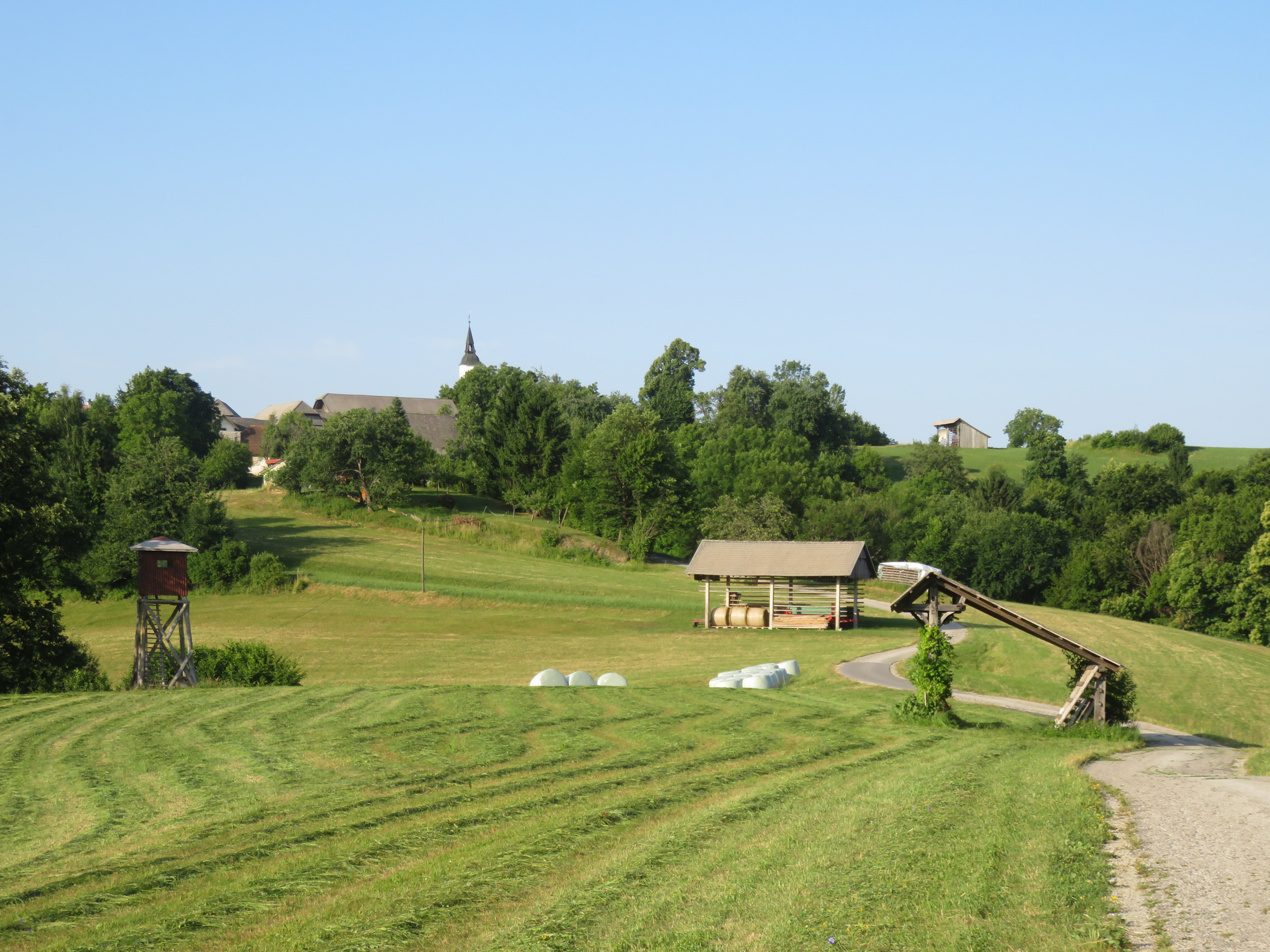

- Location in Slovenia
- Coordinates: 46°1′26.12″N 14°57′12.59″E
- Country: Slovenia
- Traditional region: Lower Carniola
- Statistical region: Central Sava
- Municipality: Litija

Area
  - Total: 2.43 km^{2} (0.94 sq mi)
- Elevation: 624.1 m (2,048 ft)

Population (2002)
  - Total: 37
- Postal code: 1274

Javorje pri Gabrovki (pronounced [ˈjaːʋɔɾjɛ pɾi ˈɡaːbɾɔu̯ki]) is a settlement northwest of Gabrovka in the Municipality of Litija in central Slovenia. The area is part of the traditional region of Lower Carniola. It is now included with the rest of the municipality in the Central Sava Statistical Region; until January 2014 the municipality was part of the Central Slovenia Statistical Region.

== Name ==
The name of the settlement was changed from Javorje to Javorje pri Gabrovki in 1953.

== Church ==
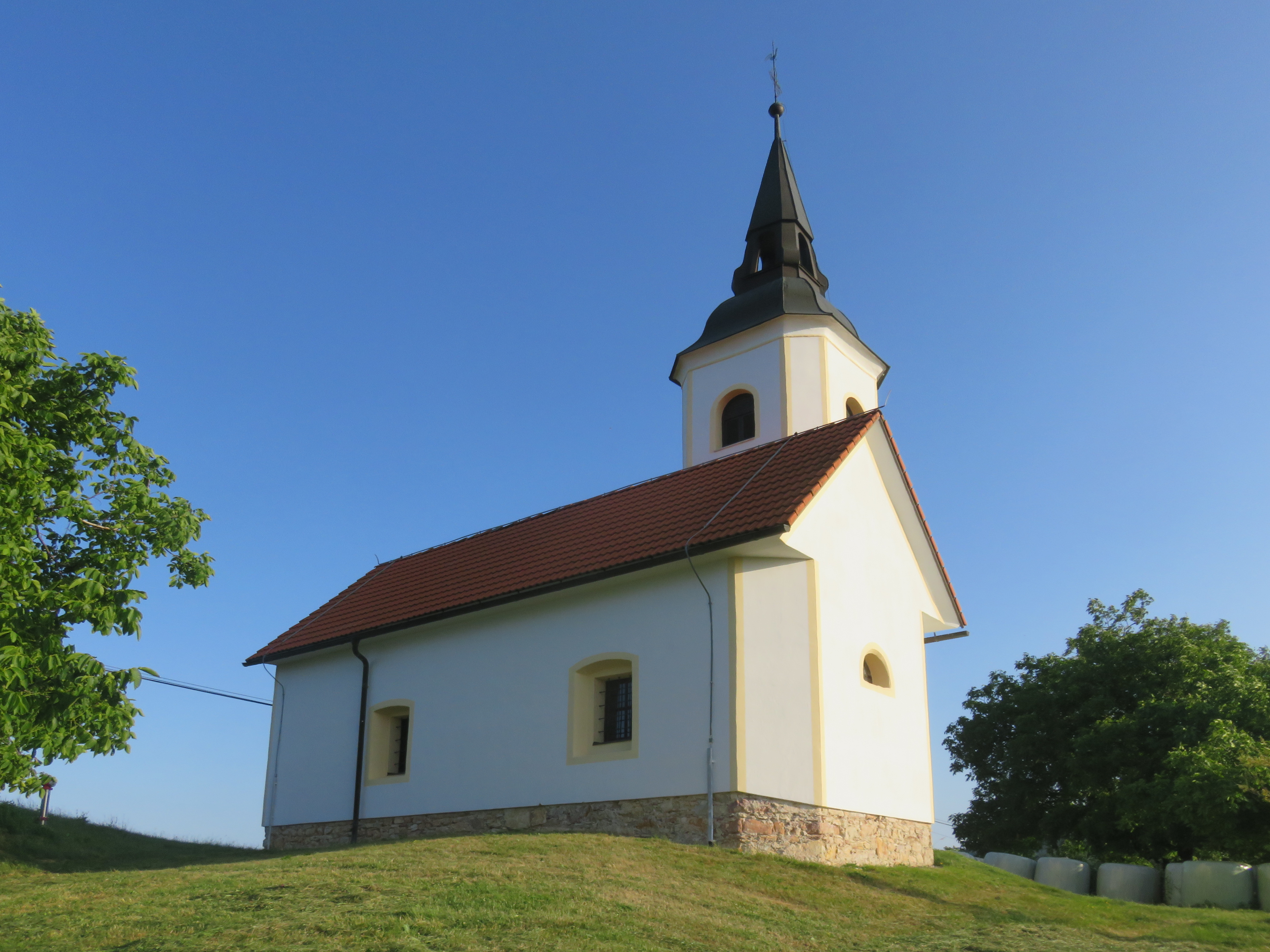
Saint Bartholomew's Church

The local church is dedicated to Saint Bartholomew (Slovene: sveti Jernej) and belongs to the Parish of Gabrovka. It was first mentioned in written documents dating to 1373, but it was rebuilt a number of times over the centuries.
