= Besnica (stream) =

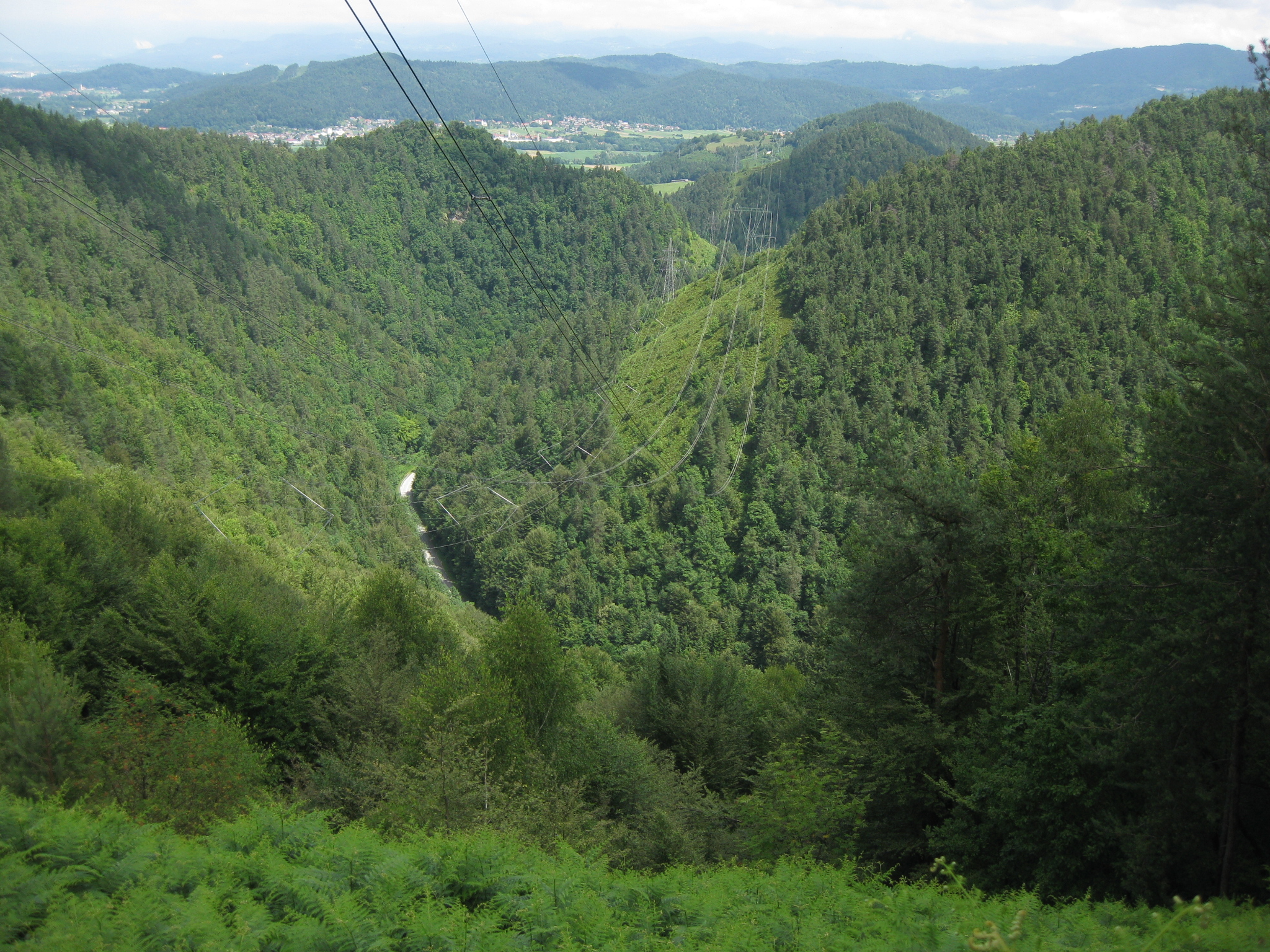
- Besnica Valley

Location
- Country: Slovenia

Physical characteristics
- Source
  - location: Northwest of Veliko Trebeljevo
- Mouth
  - location: Ljubljanica River at Podgrad
  - coordinates: 46°4′21.92″N 14°38′9.32″E

Basin features
- Progression: Ljubljanica→ Sava→ Danube→ Black Sea

The Besnica is a stream that flows through the Besnica Valley east of Ljubljana. It flows through the scattered settlement of Besnica and empties into the Ljubljanica at Podgrad as its last right tributary just before it joins the Sava River. In the past, this was also the quadruple confluence of the stream with the Sava, Kamnik Bistrica, and Ljubljanica rivers.

== Name ==
The name Besnica is originally a hydronym and was later also applied to the settlement of Besnica along the stream. The name is derived from the Slavic adjective *běsьnъ 'rushing, swift', referring to the character of the stream.

== See also ==
- List of rivers of Slovenia
