= Ljubljanica =

River in Slovenia

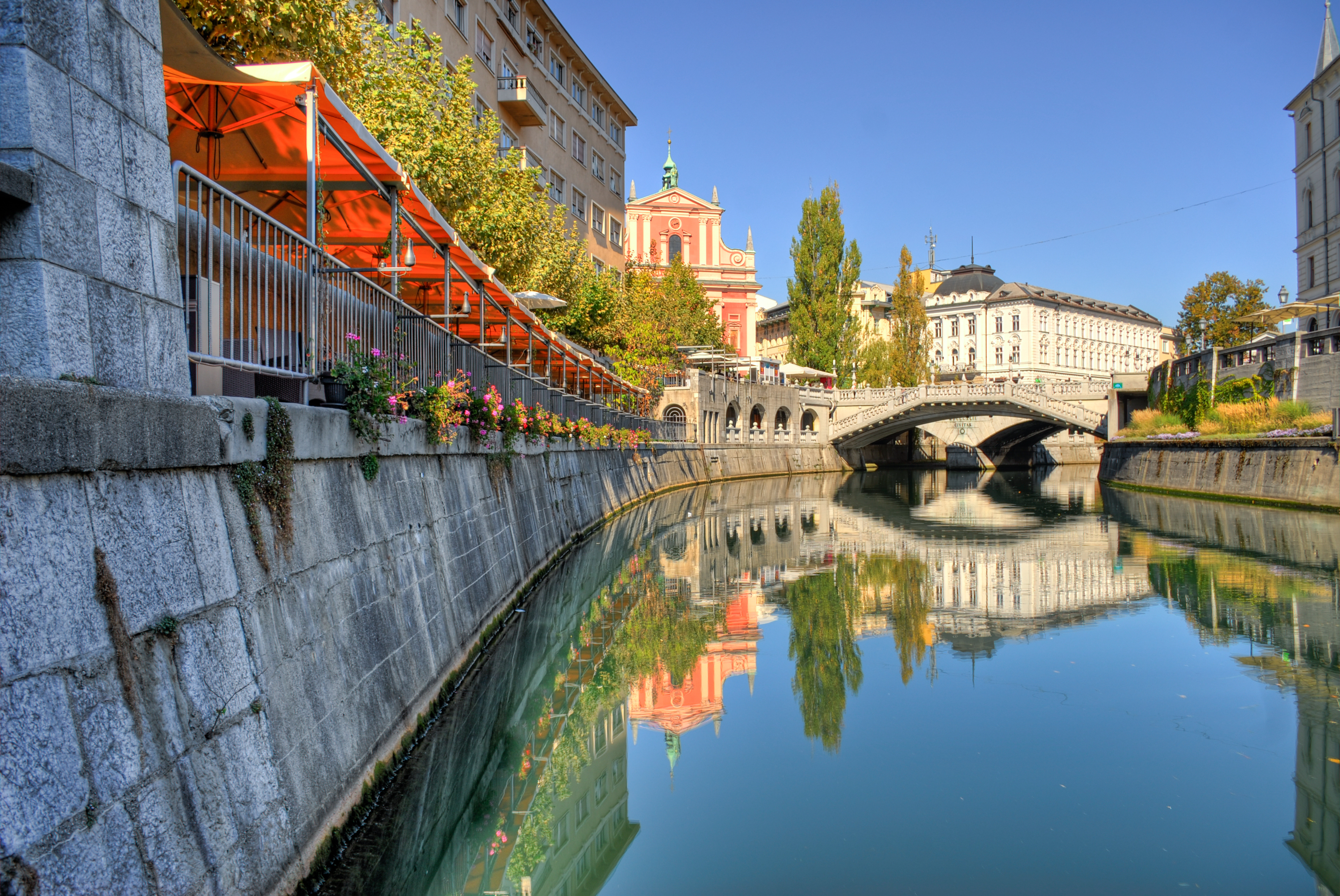
- The Ljubljanica in Ljubljana

Location
- Country: Slovenia

Physical characteristics
- Source
  - location: Retovje45°57′5″N 14°17′41″E, Ljubija45°57′11″N 14°18′0″E, Bistra
  - coordinates: 45°56′51″N 14°20′3″E
  - elevation: 300 m (980 ft)
- Mouth
  - location: Podgrad
  - coordinates: 46°4′11″N 14°38′20″E
  - elevation: 260 m (850 ft)
- Length: 41 km (25 mi)(including Little Ljubljanica)
- Basin size: 1,860 km^{2} (720 sq mi)
- Discharge
  - average: 25 m^{3}/s (880 cu ft/s) (at the source near Vrhnika), 55 m^{3}/s (at the outflow in Moste)

Basin features
- Progression: Sava→ Danube→ Black Sea

The Ljubljanica (pronounced [ljuˈbljáːnitsa]), known in the Middle Ages as the Leybach, is a river in the southern part of the Ljubljana Basin in Slovenia. The capital of Slovenia, Ljubljana, lies on the river. The Ljubljanica rises south of the town of Vrhnika and flows into the Sava River about 10 kilometres (6.2 mi) downstream from Ljubljana. Its largest affluent is the Mali Graben Canal. Including its source affluent the Little Ljubljanica (Slovene: Mala Ljubljanica), the river is 41 km (25 mi) in length. The Little Ljubljanica joins the Big Ljubljanica (Slovene: Velika Ljubljanica) after 1,300 m (4,300 ft) and the river continues its course as the Ljubljanica.

The Ljubljanica is the continuation of several karst rivers that flow from the Prezid Karst Field (Slovene: Prezidsko polje) to Vrhnika on the surface and underground in caves, and so the river is poetically said to have seven names (six name changes): Trbuhovica, Obrh, Stržen, Rak, Pivka, Unica, and Ljubljanica.

== Archaeological significance ==
The Ljubljanica has become a popular site for archaeologists and treasure hunters to dive for lost relics and artifacts. Locations in the river between Ljubljana and Vrhnika have offered up pieces of history from the Stone Age to the Renaissance, belonging to a variety of groups, from local ancient cultures to more well-known groups like the Romans and the Celts. One of the more significant findings is a yew spearhead, found in 2009 in Sinja Gorica. It has been dated to about 35,000 to 45,000 before present, the Szeletian period, and supplements the scant data about the presence of Stone Age hunters in the Ljubljana Marsh area.

Exactly why the Ljubljanica became an article dumping ground is unknown, but most historians believe that it is related to how local tradition has always held the river as a sacred place. These treasures may have been offered "to the river during rites of passage, in mourning, or as thanksgiving for battles won."

The Ljubljanica has become a popular attraction in Europe for treasure hunters. This has created an ethical debate between local historians and international treasure seekers. It is believed that the river has offered up between 10,000 and 13,000 objects, of which many have been lost to the public. Many pieces have been sold into private collections, or are hidden away by the original treasure hunters. In 2003, to help curb this trend, Slovenia's national parliament declared the river a site of cultural importance and banned diving in it without a permit.

== Gallery ==
The Ljubljanica at Nove Fužine

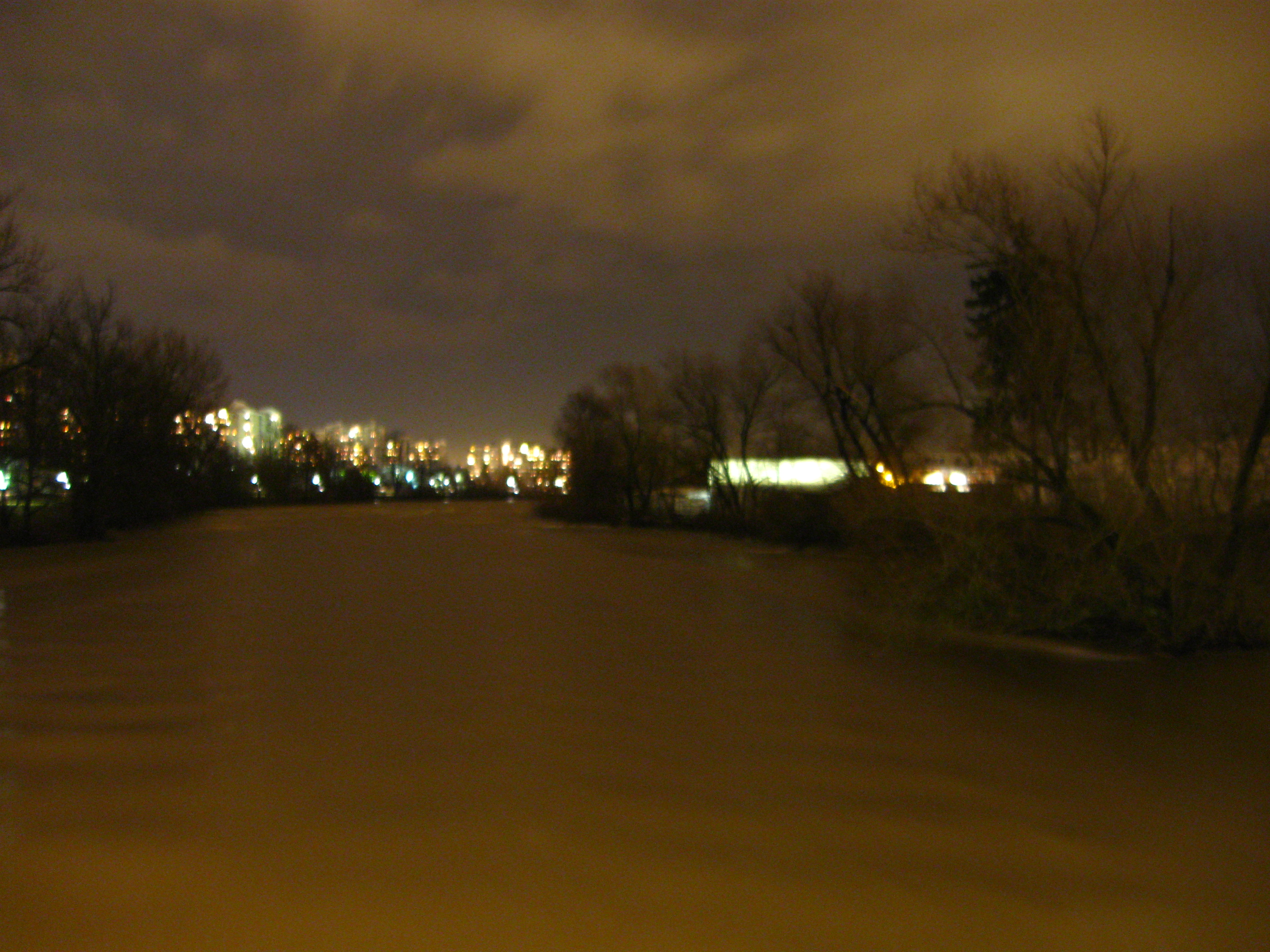
Night view of the river

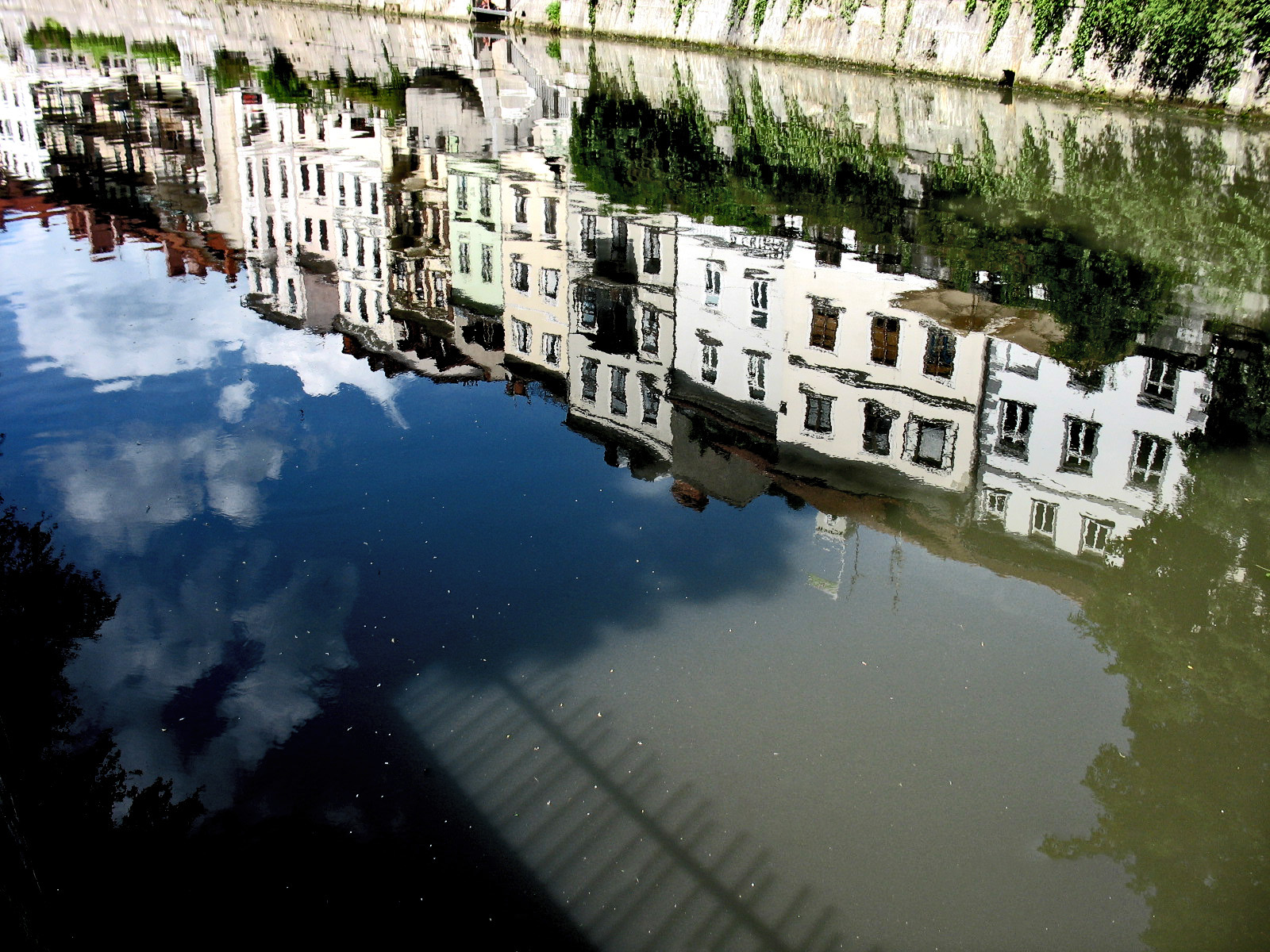
Reflection of houses at the Cankar Embankment

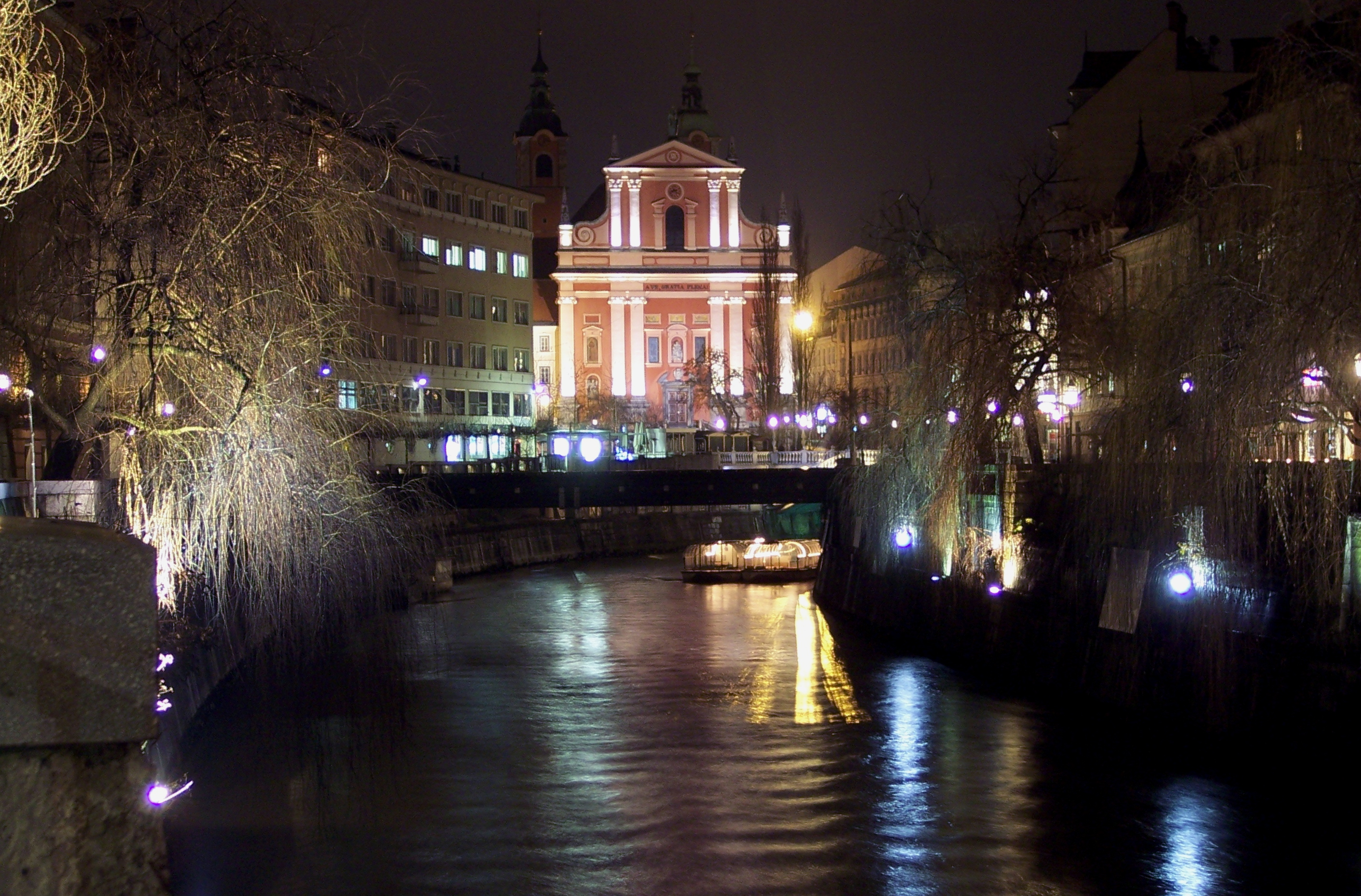
Center of Ljubljana with Annunciation Church in the background

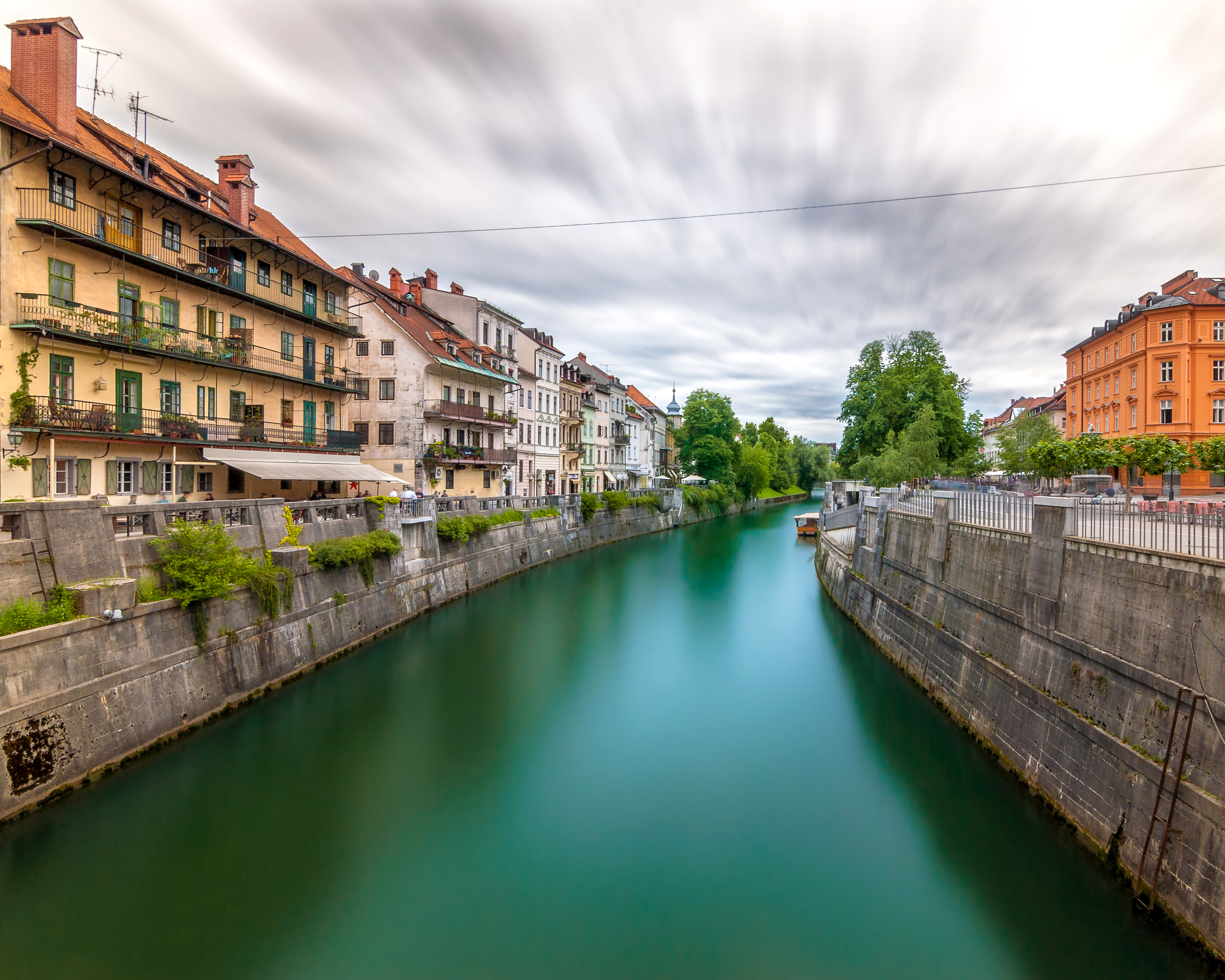
The Ljubljanica from the Cobbler Bridge in Ljubljana

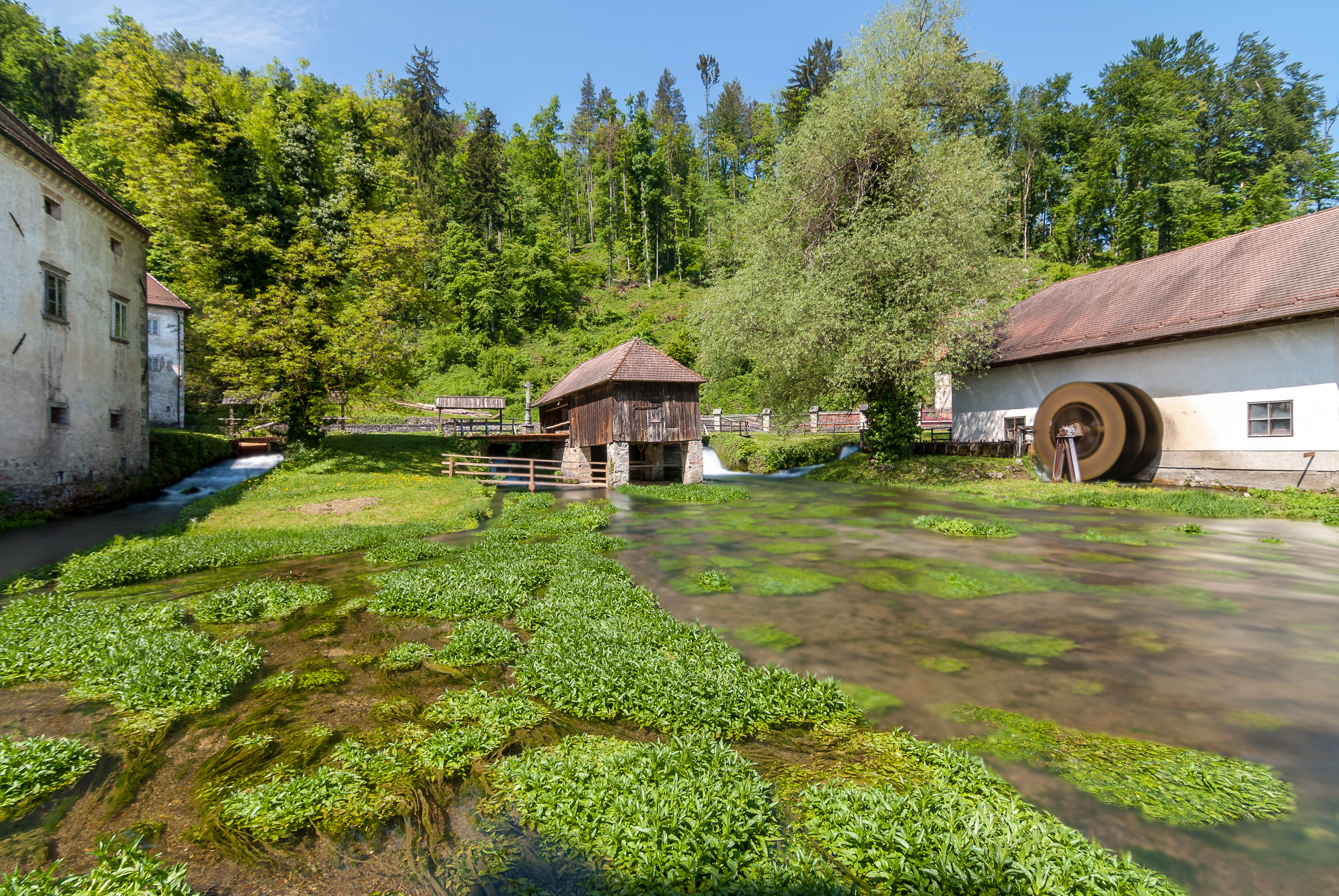
One of the springs of the Ljubljanica at Bistra Castle near Vrhnika

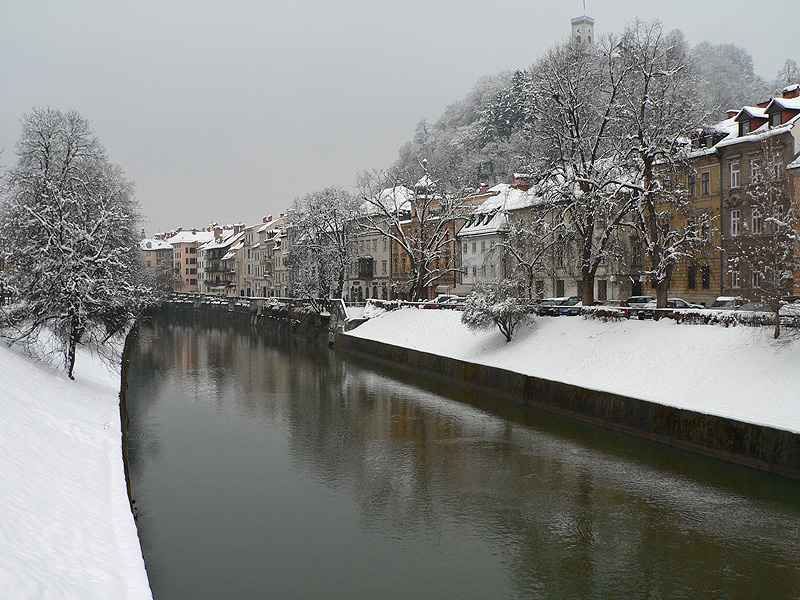
The Ljubljanica under the snow

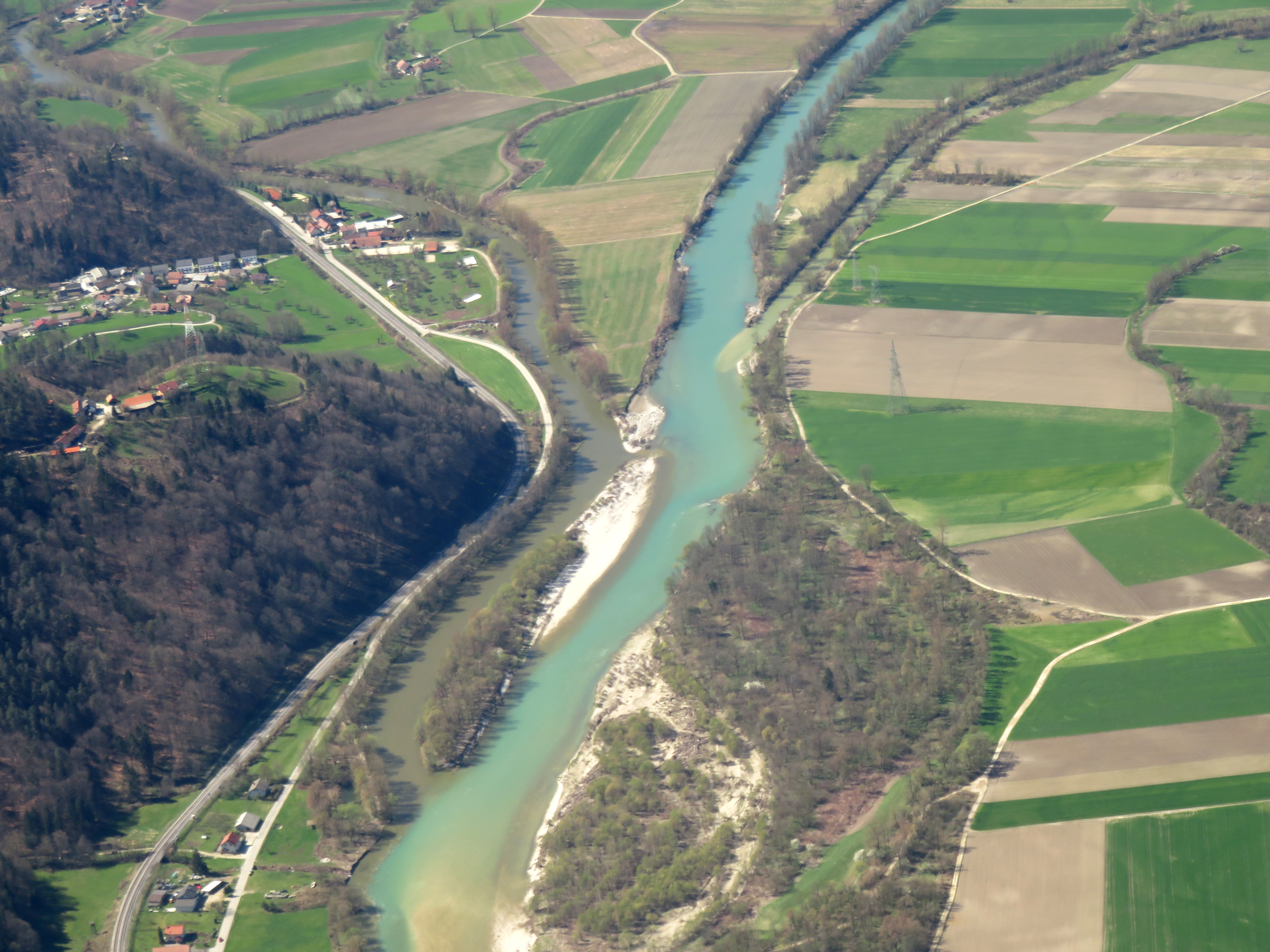
Confluence of the Ljubljanica (left) with the Sava and Kamnik Bistrica

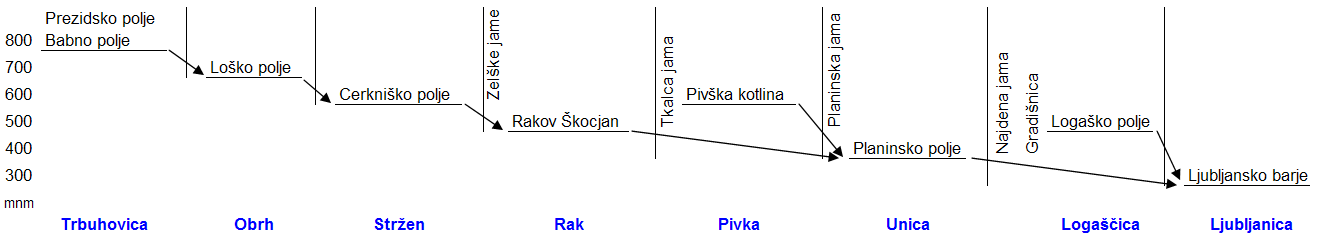
Ljubljanica basin

== See also ==
- Ljubljanica Sluice Gate
