= Podgrad, Ljubljana =

Podgrad
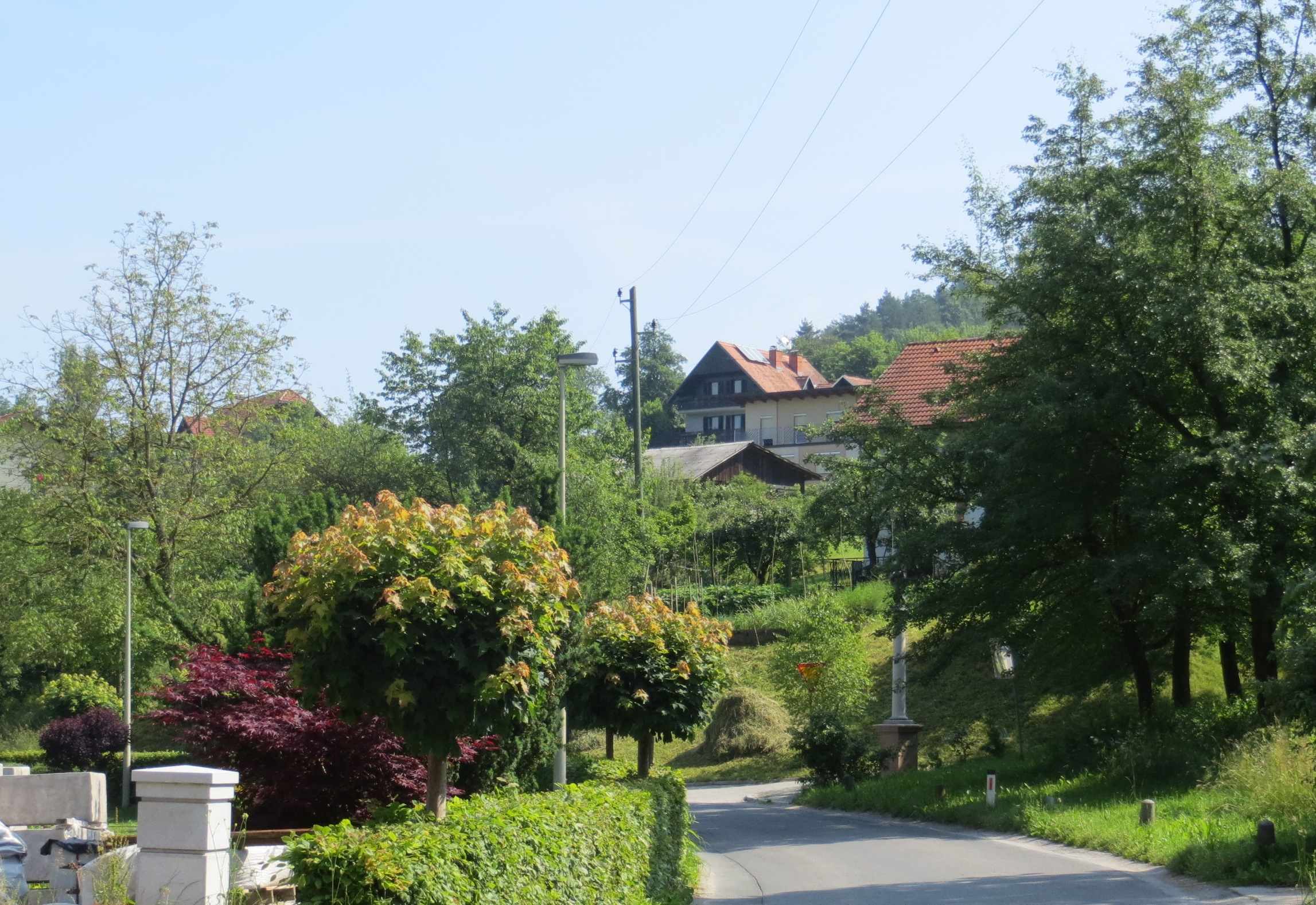

- Location in Slovenia
- Coordinates: 46°4′10.93″N 14°38′19.74″E
- Country: Slovenia
- Traditional region: Lower Carniola
- Statistical region: Central Slovenia
- Municipality: Ljubljana

Area
  - Total: 4.07 km^{2} (1.57 sq mi)
- Elevation: 275.2 m (903 ft)

Population (2002)
  - Total: 220
- Postal code: 1000

Podgrad (pronounced [pɔdˈɡɾáːt, ˈpɔ̀ːdɡɾat]) is a settlement east of the capital Ljubljana in central Slovenia. It belongs to the City Municipality of Ljubljana. The area is part of the traditional region of Lower Carniola and is now included with the rest of the municipality in the Central Slovenia Statistical Region.

== Geography ==
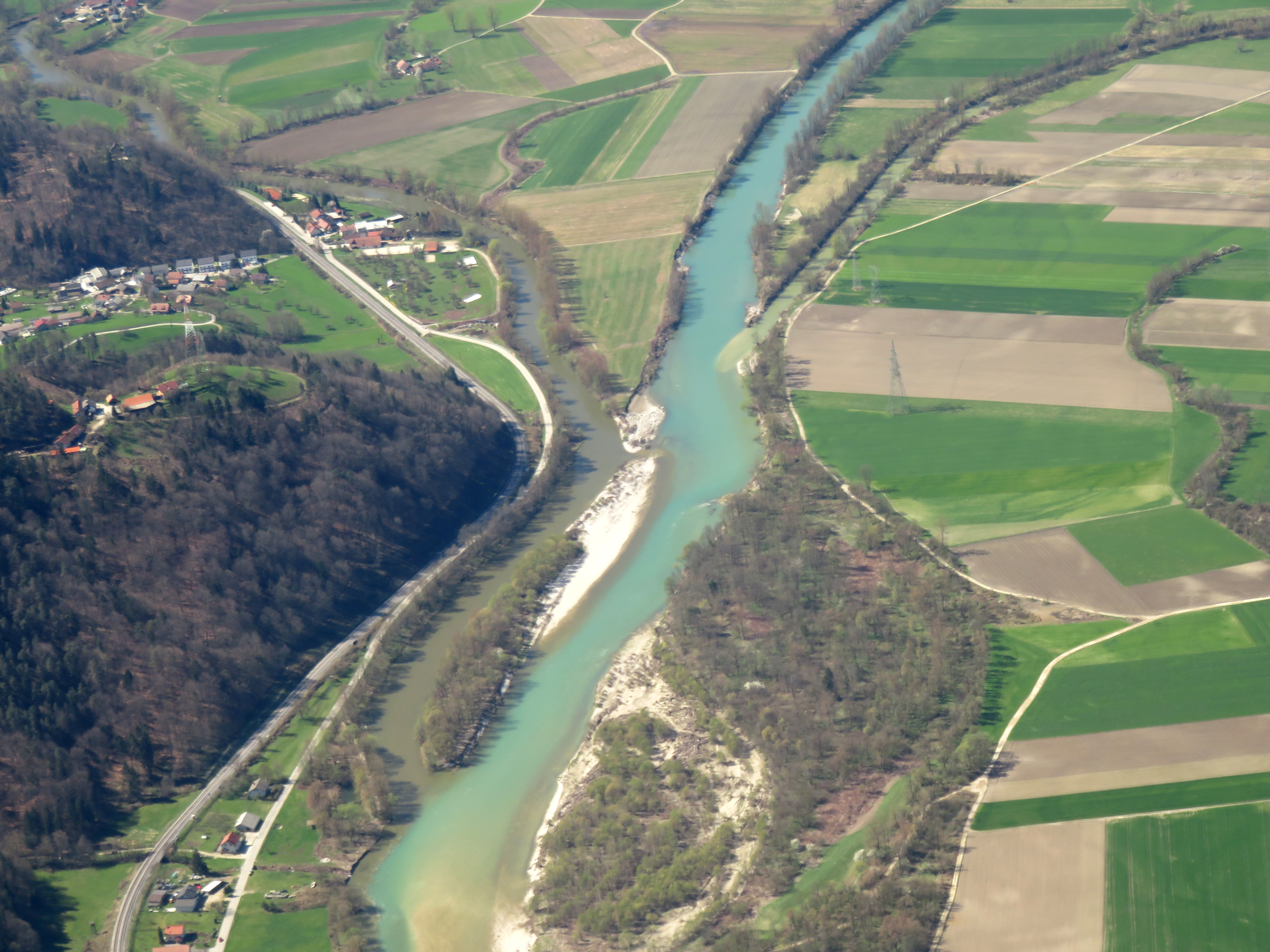
Confluence of the Ljubljanica (left) with the Sava and Kamnik Bistrica rivers. Podgrad, the Lazar farm, and the hamlet of Gradovle are at left.

Podgrad lies on the right bank of the Ljubljanica River at the entrance into the Besnica Valley. The Ljubljanica flows into the Sava immediately northeast of the settlement core. The railway line from Ljubljana to Zidani Most runs through the settlement.

== Name ==
The name Podgrad (literally, 'below the castle') is a fused prepositional phrase that has lost its case inflection. It refers to the village's location below Osterberg Castle (Slovene: Sostro or Ostri vrh), the ruins of which are located on Castle Hill (Slovene: Grad) west of Besnica Creek. Osterberg Castle is also the source of the name of the settlement of Sostro.

== History ==
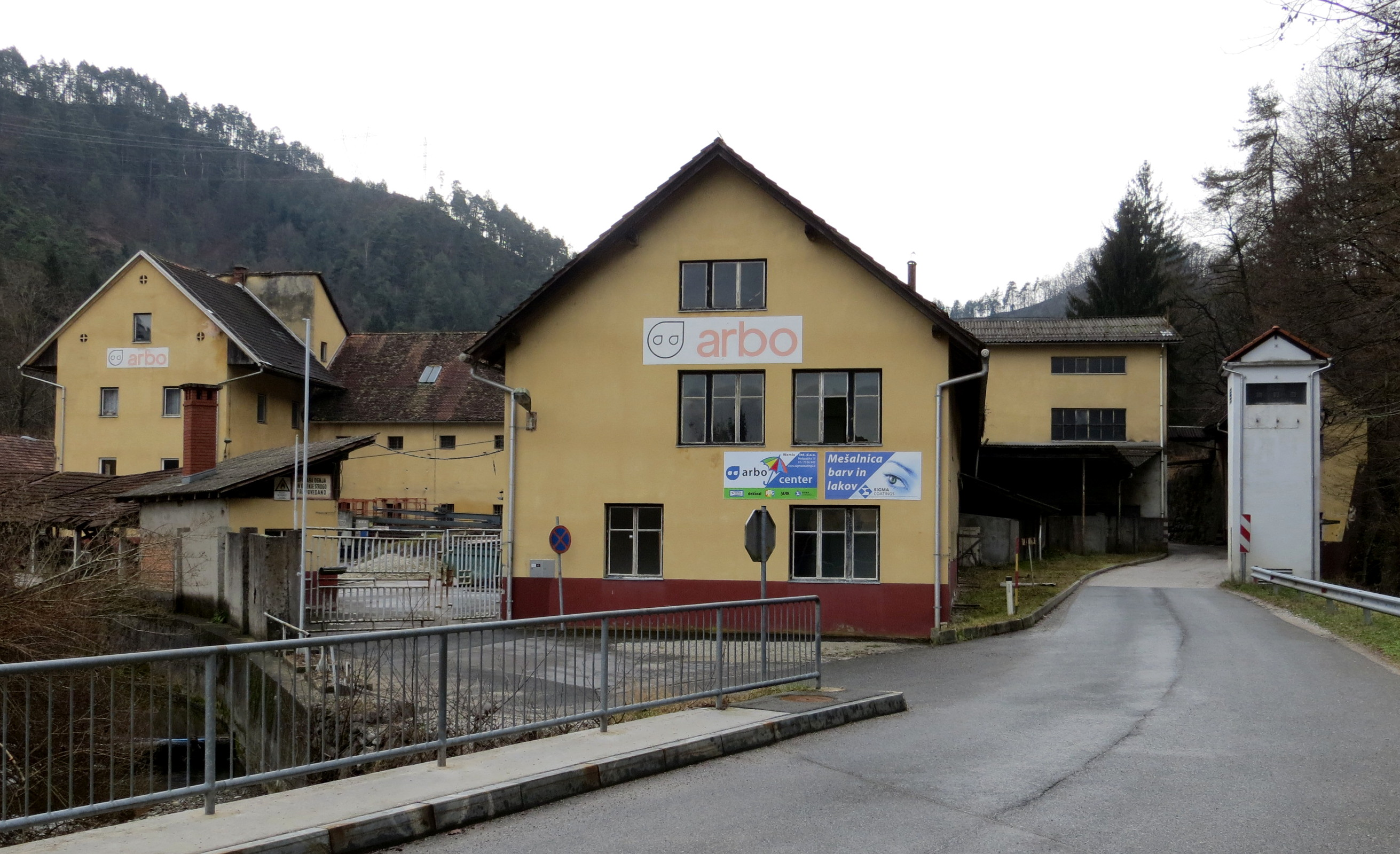
Factory in Podgrad

A chemical factory was established in Podgrad in the second half of the 19th century but burned down in 1880. It was reestablished in 1910 as pigment factory that later expanded into producing organic dyes. The Arbo company was created from the plant in 1953, and the dye operations were then transferred to Celje.

== Castles ==
Osterberg Castle was built circa 1015 by the Counts of Scharffenberg, lesser nobles subject to the Spanheims. In the 16th century, Alexander zu Osterberg built a new manor at Dol pri Ljubljani across the Sava River, after which Osterberg Castle fell into disrepair. In the 18th century, Povše Castle (Slovene: Povšetov grad) was built below the old castle and closer to the Ljubljanica River. It was later purchased by the Mayer Kansky family and renovated in 1933.
