= Javornik, Idrija =

Javornik
- Location in Slovenia
- Coordinates: 45°53′36.97″N 14°4′29.63″E
- Country: Slovenia
- Traditional region: Inner Carniola
- Statistical region: Gorizia
- Municipality: Idrija

Area
  - Total: 7.46 km^{2} (2.88 sq mi)
- Elevation: 1,139.9 m (3,740 ft)

Population (2014)
  - Total: 1

Javornik (pronounced [ˈjaːʋɔɾnik]) is a small dispersed settlement on the slopes of Javornik Hill south of Črni Vrh in the Municipality of Idrija in the traditional Inner Carniola region of Slovenia. Its remoteness and high elevation have resulted in people moving away from their farms, and there is only a single resident in the settlement.
