= Perovo =

Perovo may refer to:

Russia:

- Perovo District, a district in Eastern Administrative Okrug of the federal city of Moscow, Russia
- Perovo Solar Park, a photovoltaic power station in Crimea
- Perovo (Moscow Metro), a station of the Moscow Metro, Moscow, Russia
- Perovo, Russia, several rural localities in Russia

Slovenia:

- Perovo, Grosuplje, a hamlet of Grosuplje in the Municipality of Grosuplje, Slovenia
- Perovo, Kamnik, a former village in the Municipality of Kamnik, Slovenia
- Perovo, Ribnica, a small settlement in the Municipality of Ribnica, Slovenia

Macedonia:

- Perovo, alternative name of Dolno Perovo, a village in the Republic of Macedonia
- Perove (Perovo), a rural locality in Crimea
