= Jerova Vas =

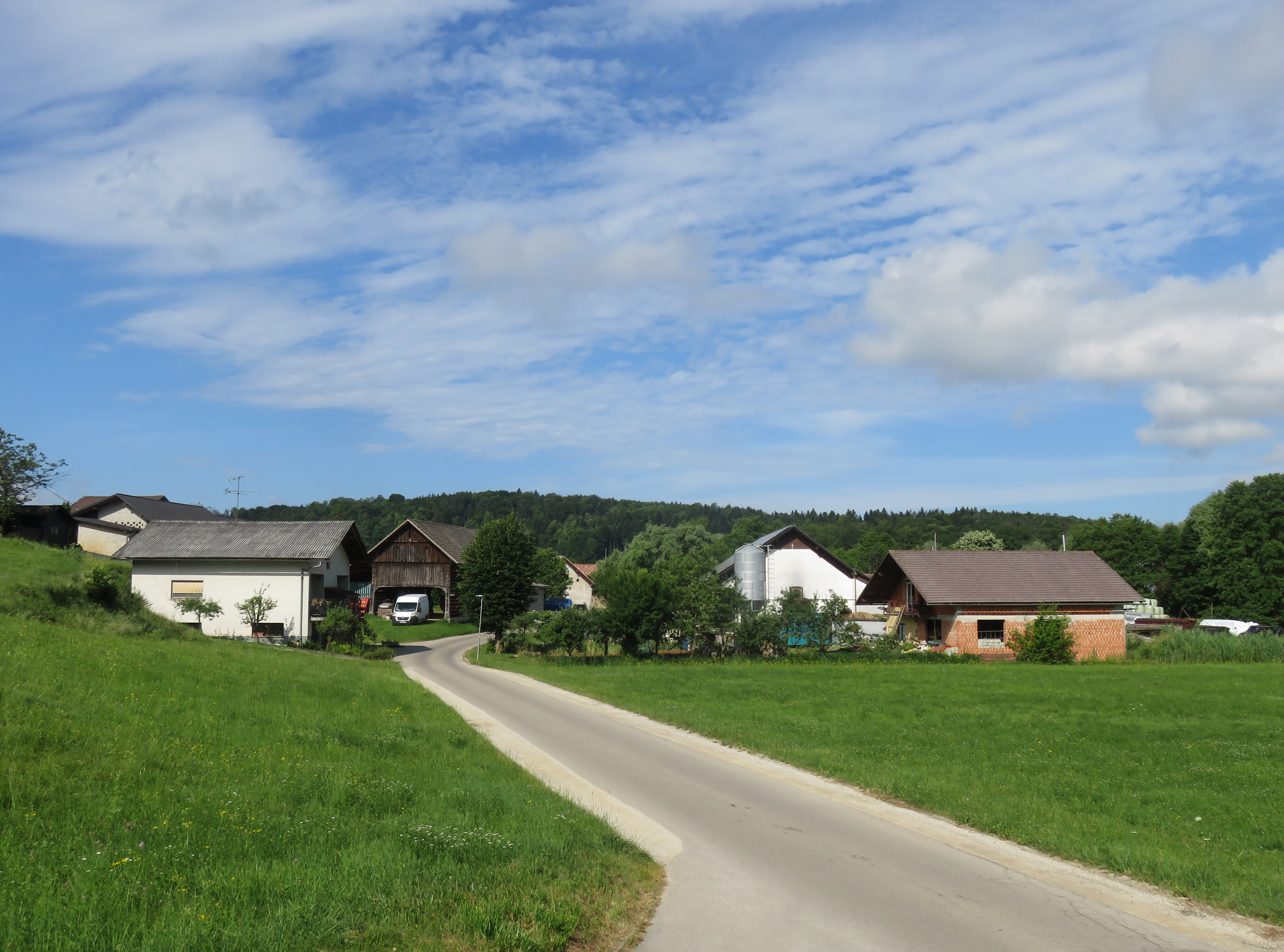

- Location in Slovenia
- Coordinates: 45°57′53.22″N 14°39′51.30″E
- Country: Slovenia
- Traditional region: Lower Carniola
- Statistical region: Central Slovenia
- Municipality: Grosuplje
- Elevation: 340 m (1,120 ft)

Jerova Vas (pronounced [jɛˈɾɔːʋa ˈʋaːs]; Slovene: Jerova vas, German: Irrdorf) is a formerly independent settlement in the northern part of the town of Grosuplje in central Slovenia. It belongs to the Municipality of Grosuplje. It is part of the traditional region of Lower Carniola and is now included with the rest of the municipality in the Central Slovenia Statistical Region.

== Geography ==
Jerova Vas is a clustered village on the west slope of Hrib Hill (340 m) and along the base of the hill. It lies between Grosuplje and Perovo, to which it is connected by a road across the swampy Logje Meadow. Stari Breg Creek, which rises in Peč, flows below the village. Due to frequent flooding of the creek, its northern course was altered during construction of the freeway from Ljubljana to Zagreb.

== Name ==
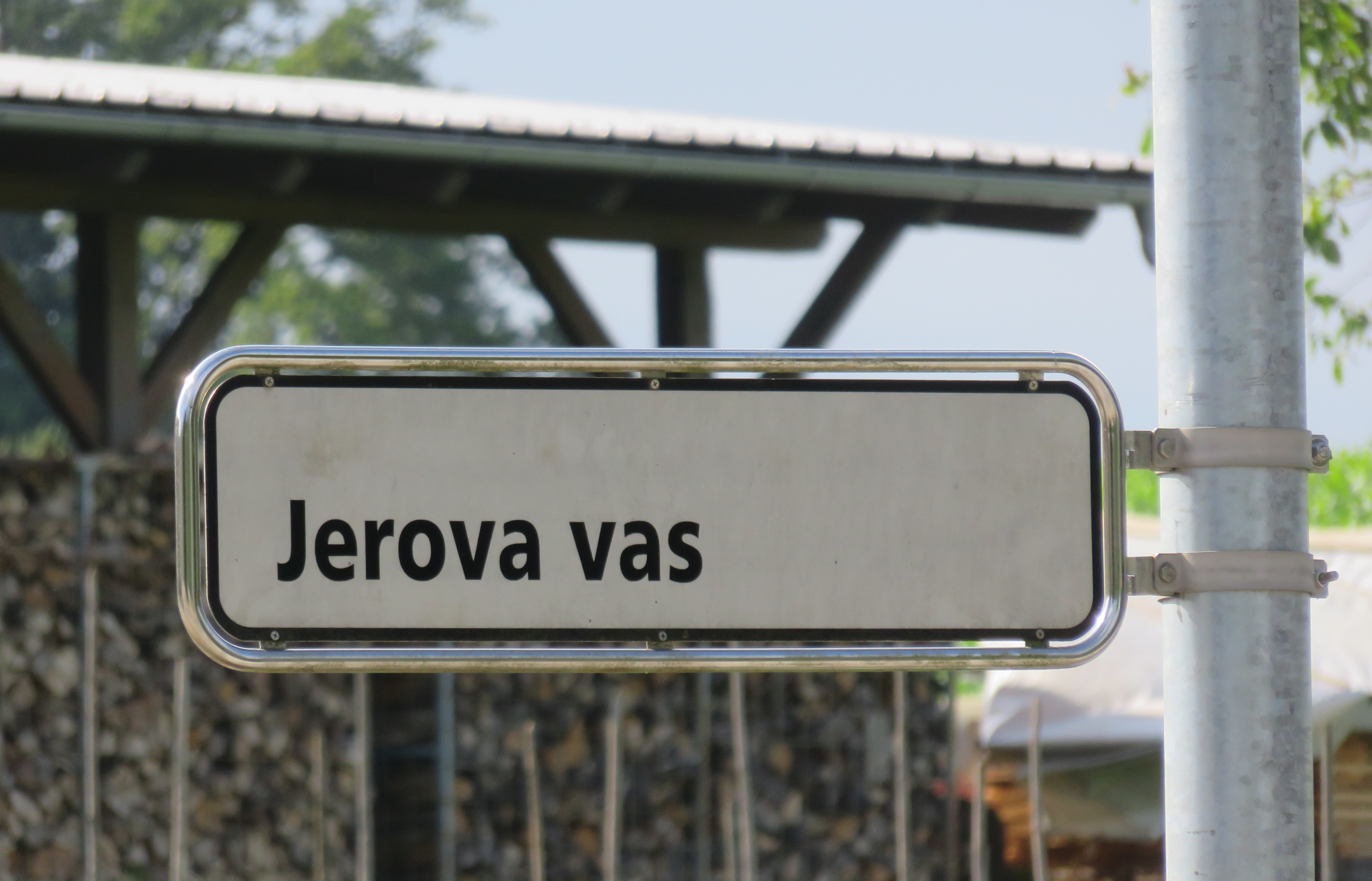
A street sign in Jerova Vas

Jerova Vas was attested in written sources in 1305 as Phapphendorf (and as Veroua vasz in 1496, Jeroua uass in 1634, and Jeraua Vaſs in 1685). The Slovene name literally means 'priest's village' (from Slovene jer 'priest'), and thus referred to an estate owned by the clergy. This explanation is confirmed by the medieval German name Phapphendorf, which has the same meaning (from Middle High German pfaffe 'priest' + dorf 'village'). In the past the German name was Irrdorf.

== History ==
The economy of the village was traditionally tied to farming, especially raising potatoes and grain. Animal husbandry was also important and milk was sold to Grosuplje and Ljubljana. A water main was installed to Jerova Vas from Black Valley (Slovene: Črna dolina) near Dobje in 1910. Jerova Vas was annexed by the town of Grosuplje in 1971, ending its existence as an independent settlement.

== Cultural heritage ==
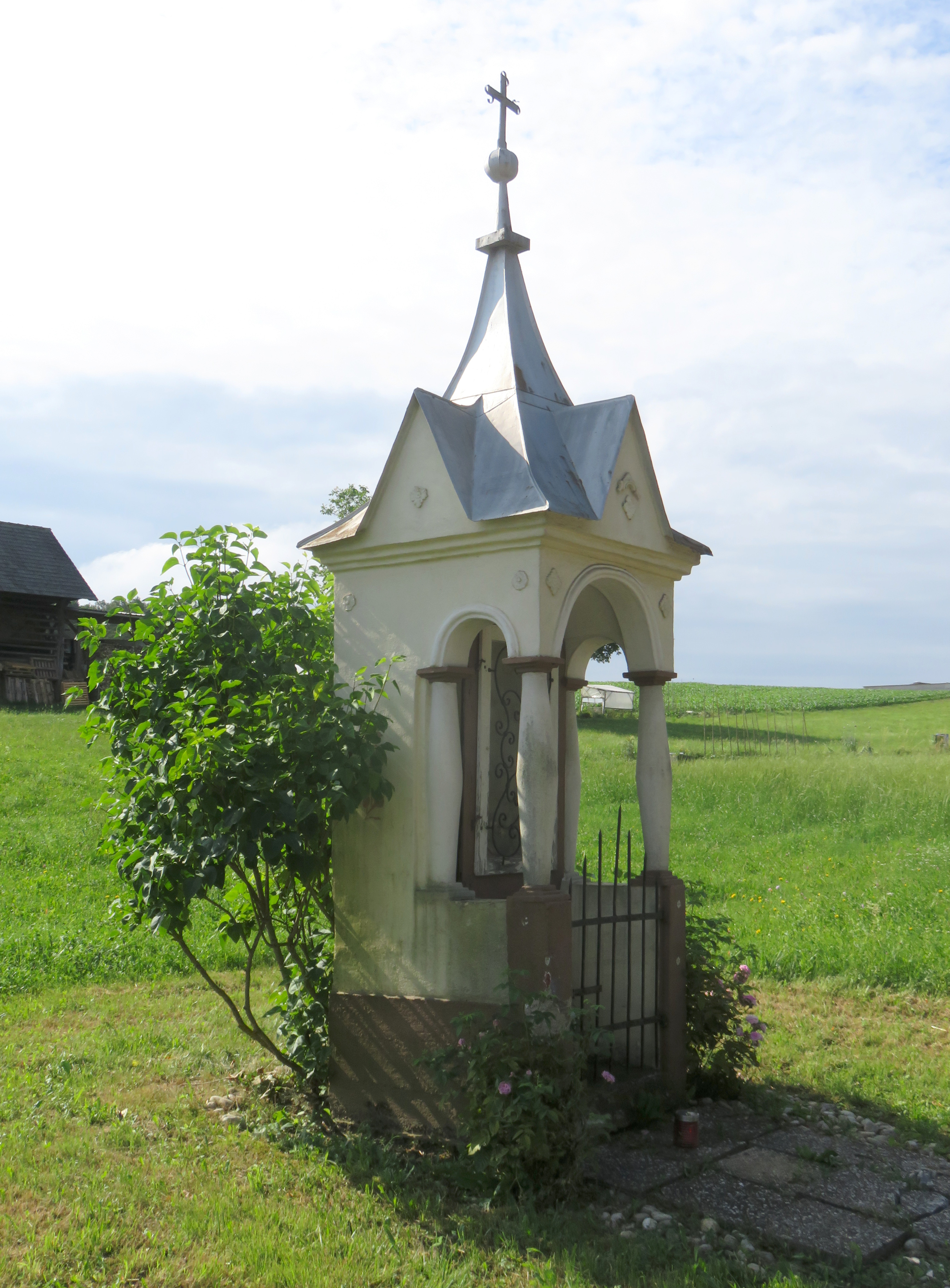
Shrine in Jerova Vas

There is a chapel-shrine in Jerova Vas dating from the last quarter of the 19th century. It is dedicated to the Virgin Mary and stands on the southwest edge of the village. The shrine has a pyramidal Gothic revival roof, and the front is open and supported by columns.
