= Marija Šuštar =

Slovenian ethnochoreologist and folklorist (1905–1989)

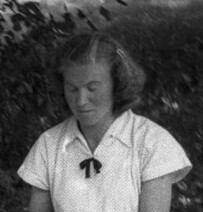
- Marija Šuštar in 1949
- Born: Marija Šuštar; January 12, 1905; Bled, (present-day Slovenia)
- Died: January 27, 1989 (aged 84); Ljubljana, (present-day Slovenia)
- Occupations: teacher, ethnochoreologist, folklorist, non-fiction writer
- Relatives: Antonija Šuštar (Tončka Marolt) (sister)
- Awards: Order of Merit for the People with Gold Star (Orden zasluga za narod)

Marija Šuštar (12 January 1905 – 27 January 1989) was a Slovenian ethnochoreologist and folklorist. She is known for her pioneering research on traditional Slovenian folk dances and her long association with the Institute of Ethnomusicology of the Research Centre of the Slovenian Academy of Sciences and Arts. She conducted extensive fieldwork throughout Slovenia and neighbouring border regions, documenting regional dance traditions and related aspects of folk culture, and played a central role in transforming collected material into scholarly publications and stage adaptations. She led the dance section of the Academic Folklore Group France Marolt from its founding in 1948 until her retirement in 1966, served as head of the folklore institute from 1951 to 1955, and was awarded the Order of Merit for the People with Gold Star in recognition of her cultural contributions.

== Childhood and education ==
She was born on 12 January 1905 into a Slovenian family in Bled. Her mother was the sacristan and organist Ana Slapnik, and her father was the sacristan and organist Janez Šuštar. She had nine siblings, of whom only two sisters besides her reached adulthood. The elder of them was the opera singer and folklorist Antonija Šuštar (1894–1988), also known as Tončka Marolt. During her childhood she moved with her family several times, until they settled in her mother's birthplace house in Okrog near Špitalič. As a musically gifted girl from a farming background, Marija Šuštar knew many traditional dances. She wished to become a singer, but her parents could not afford musical education, so she trained at a teachers’ college.

== Work ==
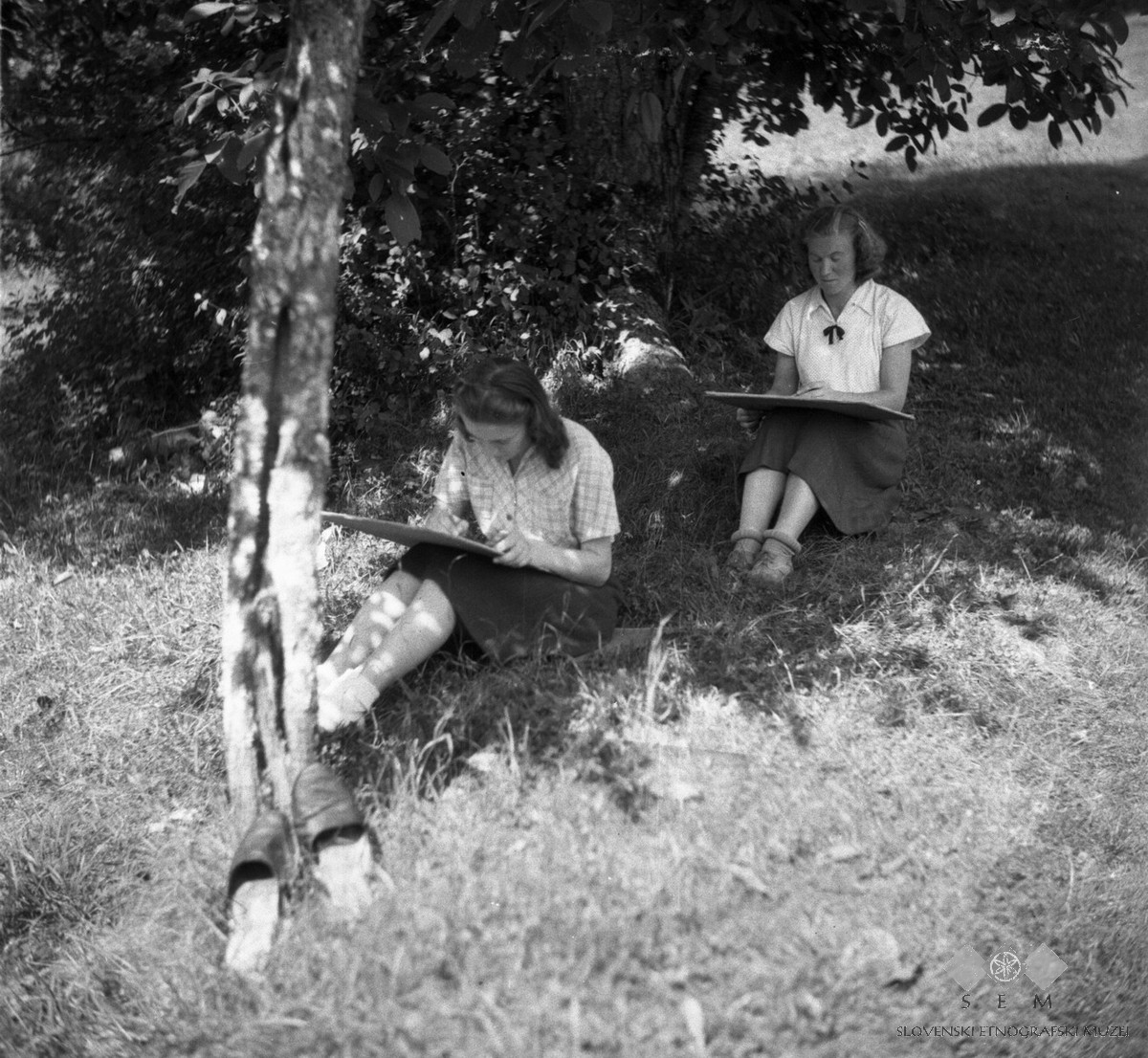
Marija Šuštar (right) with a colleague at work in Peč in 1949

After graduating from the teachers’ college, she worked as a teacher in Styria. At the outbreak of the Second World War she was employed in Lovrenc na Dravskem Polju. In 1941, fleeing Nazi persecution, she escaped to her sister Tončka, who lived in Ljubljana with her husband France Marolt and their son. There she found job as an assistant at what was then Marolt's Folklore Institute (today Glasbenonarodopisni inštitut ZRC SAZU - Institute of Ethnomusicology of the Research Centre of the Slovenian Academy of Sciences and Arts). She lived with her sister. Meanwhile, she trained in ethnomusicology and ethnochoreology.

In 1945 she prepared a performance of a suite of Carinthian dances with three pairs of young people. After the war she advanced to become a professional associate of the institute and was entrusted with researching folk dances. As a professional associate of the institute she travelled throughout Slovenia and the Slovene border regions, where she researched primarily traditional dances, as well as old tools, furniture, and buildings. She also carried out research in Resia, where among local people she was known as Maričica (little Marija). She wrote several books about her research. In some of her books she collaborated with her brother-in-law France Marolt and the ballet dancer Henrik Neubauer.

When a folklore ensemble was founded at the institute in 1948, the Academic Folklore Group (now known as Akademska folklorna skupina France Marolt - Academic Folklore Group France Marolt), she took over leadership of its dance section and held this position until retirement. In 1951, after the death of France Marolt, she became head (manager) of the folklore institute, a post she held for four years.

As a lecturer she took part in various republic and federal seminars intended for teaching folk dances, and she was a member of the federal jury that selected ensembles across Yugoslavia to perform at the conference of the International Folk Music Council (IFMC) in Opatija in 1951. With papers on Slovenian folk dances and their characteristics she participated in the congresses of the Association of Yugoslav Folklorists and published in the congress proceedings. For the academic folklore group she compiled several stage adaptations of Upper Carniolan, Carinthian, Prekmurje, Littoral, and Resian dances from the collected material of Slovenian dance heritage. She retired in 1966.

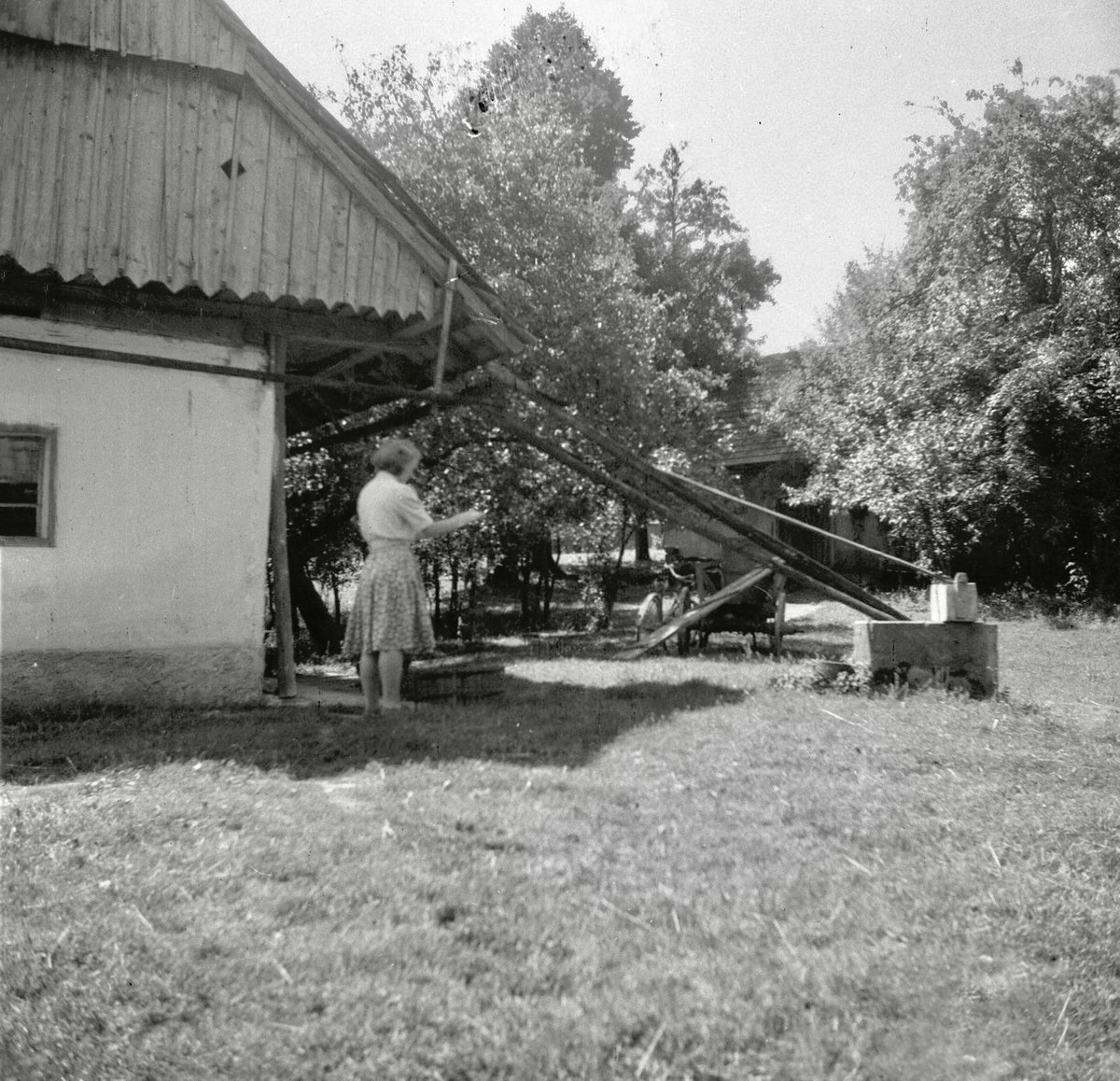
Marija Šuštar drawing a well (šterna) with a wooden bucket in Sela pri Šmarju in 1949

== Later life and death ==
After retirement she continued to publish and maintained contact with former colleagues. On the occasion of her 80th birthday, the academic folklore group held a concert of Slovenian folk dances in Cankarjev dom on 19 January 1985 in her honour. Her last publication was the article O petju, godcih in plesu pod Menino planino (On singing, musicians, and dancing below Mount Menina) in the journal Traditiones in 1975. She never married and had no children. She died on 27 January 1989 in Ljubljana. She was buried at Ljubljana's Žale cemetery together with her sister Tončka.

== Awards ==
- Order of Merit for the People with Gold Star (Orden zasluga za narod) - Yugoslavia

== Bibliography ==
- Slovenski ljudski plesi Primorske (Slovenian Folk Dances of the Slovene Littoral) (Slovenski ljudski plesi 1, 1958; Ljubljana: Glasbeno narodopisni institut).
- Slovenski ljudski plesi Koroške (Slovenian Folk Dances of Carinthia) (Slovenski ljudski plesi 2., with France Marolt; 1958; Ljubljana: Glasbeno narodopisni institut).
- Slovenski ljudski plesi Koroške (Slovenian Folk Dances of Carinthia), (Slovenski ljudski plesi 2., with France Marolt and Henrik Neubauer; 1958; Ljubljana: Glasbeno narodopisni institut).
- Oblike plesa štajeriš na Slovenskem (Forms of the dance "Štajeriš" in Slovenia) (1959–1960; Ljubljana).
- Slovenski ljudski plesi Prekmurja (Slovenian Folk Dances of Prekmurje) (1968; Ljubljana: Glasbeno narodopisni institut).
