= Njiverce =

- Location in Slovenia
- Coordinates: 46°24′24.22″N 15°48′10.18″E
- Country: Slovenia
- Traditional region: Styria
- Statistical region: Drava
- Municipality: Kidričevo

Area
  - Total: 4.19 km^{2} (1.62 sq mi)
- Elevation: 236.2 m (775 ft)

Population (2002)
  - Total: 602

Njiverce (pronounced [ˈnjiːʋɛɾtsɛ], in older sources Nivrce, German: Niverzen) is a settlement next to Kidričevo in northeastern Slovenia. The area is part of the traditional region of Styria. It is now included with the rest of the Municipality of Kidričevo in the Drava Statistical Region.

During the First World War in 1915, the abandoned local cemetery was used as a burial ground for 2,340 soldiers of various nationalities. In 1917 a small Neo-Baroque chapel was built on the site.
