= Gaj, Slovenska Bistrica =

Gaj
- Location in Slovenia
- Coordinates: 46°23′56.15″N 15°40′21.84″E
- Country: Slovenia
- Traditional region: Styria
- Statistical region: Drava
- Municipality: Slovenska Bistrica

Area
  - Total: 1.77 km^{2} (0.68 sq mi)
- Elevation: 249.6 m (819 ft)

Population (2002)
  - Total: 615

Gaj (pronounced [ˈɡaːi̯]) is a settlement just east of Pragersko in the Municipality of Slovenska Bistrica in northeastern Slovenia. The area is part of the traditional region of Styria. It is now included with the rest of the municipality in the Drava Statistical Region.

In 1980 part of the settlement was split off to become Spodnji Gaj pri Pragerskem in the neighboring Municipality of Kidričevo.

At the Žutreki archaeological site north of the settlement, numerous Bronze Age and Roman artefacts were discovered during field surveys. In 2003 the site was partially excavated and traces of wooden prehistoric structures were discovered.
