= Perovo, Russia =

Perovo (Russian: Перово) is the name of several rural localities in Russia:

- Perovo, Republic of Crimea, a selo in Simferopolsky District of the Republic of Crimea
- Perovo, Krasnoyarsk Krai, a village in Chistopolsky Selsoviet of Balakhtinsky District in Krasnoyarsk Krai
- Perovo, Leningrad Oblast, a settlement in Goncharovskoye Settlement Municipal Formation of Vyborgsky District in Leningrad Oblast; 60°41′N 28°58′E
- Perovo, Pskov Oblast, a village in Palkinsky District of Pskov Oblast
- Perovo, Molokovsky District, Tver Oblast, a village in Akhmatovskoye Rural Settlement of Molokovsky District in Tver Oblast
- Perovo, Selizharovsky District, Tver Oblast, a village in Berezugskoye Rural Settlement of Selizharovsky District in Tver Oblast
- Perovo, Gus-Khrustalny District, Vladimir Oblast, a village in Gus-Khrustalny District of Vladimir Oblast
- Perovo, Vyaznikovsky District, Vladimir Oblast, a village in Vyaznikovsky District of Vladimir Oblast
- Perovo, Vologda Oblast, a village in Ustretsky Selsoviet of Syamzhensky District in Vologda Oblast
- Perovo, Yaroslavl Oblast, a village in Perovsky Rural Okrug of Rostovsky District in Yaroslavl Oblast
