= Duplica, Kamnik =

Duplica
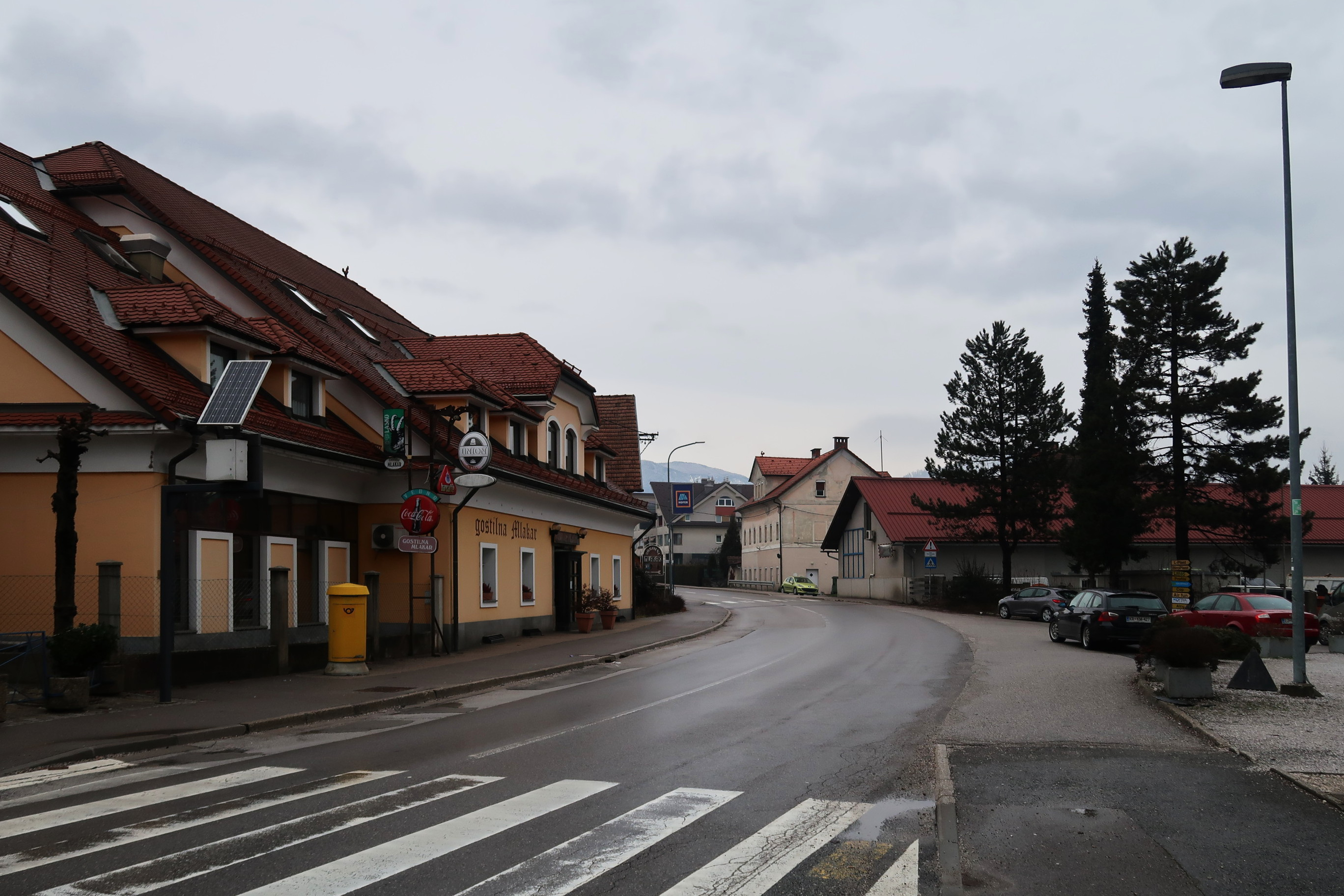

- Location in Slovenia
- Coordinates: 46°12′08″N 14°35′47″E
- Country: Slovenia
- Traditional region: Upper Carniola
- Statistical region: Central Slovenia
- Municipality: Kamnik
- Elevation: 360 m (1,180 ft)

Duplica (pronounced [duˈpliːtsa], German: Duplitza) is a former settlement in the Municipality of Kamnik in central Slovenia. It is now part of the town of Kamnik. The area is part of the traditional region of Upper Carniola. The municipality is now included in the Central Slovenia Statistical Region.

== Geography ==
Duplica lies south of Kamnik, between Bakovnik and Šmarca, on a terrace above the right bank of the Kamnik Bistrica River.

== Name ==
Duplica was attested in historical sources as Tevplicz in 1359, Dewplicz in 1415, Duplicz in 1444, and Dopplicz in 1475, among other spellings. The name is believed to derive from a diminutive of the common noun *dupľь 'hollow, cavity', referring to a place where there were hollows or pits in the terrain. A less likely hypothesis derives Duplica from an unconfirmed personal name.

== History ==
During construction of the Kamnik Railway in 1890, Roman graves were discovered in Duplica, testifying to its early settlement. Other archaeological discoveries include bracelets from urn graves and bronze items, among which was a Bronze Age sword.

Duplica originally had an agricultural character, but it developed into an industrial suburb of Kamnik between the two world wars, with a large furniture factory. Labor strikes were held in Duplica in 1934 and 1935. During the Second World War, Partisan activity damaged the bridge across the Kamnik Bistrica, the furniture factory, and telephone lines in Duplica in 1941. The factory was further targeted by the Partisans in 1943 and 1944. The Partisans operated an underground printshop in Duplica from the end of 1942 until the end of April 1943. There was an engagement between Axis forces and the Partisans' Šlander brigade south of Duplica on February 19, 1943.

After the war, the Emona company established one of the largest poultry farms in Slovenia in Duplica. Local schooling was established in Duplica in 1966 and took place in private homes until 1969, when a school building was built. Duplica was annexed by Kamnik in 1994, ending its existence as an independent settlement.
