= Apače (disambiguation) =

Apače may refer to places in Slovenia:

- Apače, town and seat of
  - Municipality of Apače
- Apače, Kidričevo
