= Pleterje, Kidričevo =

Pleterje
- Location in Slovenia
- Coordinates: 46°22′50.31″N 15°44′57.15″E
- Country: Slovenia
- Traditional region: Styria
- Statistical region: Drava
- Municipality: Kidričevo

Area
  - Total: 8.33 km^{2} (3.22 sq mi)
- Elevation: 237.5 m (779 ft)

Population (2002)
  - Total: 262

Pleterje (pronounced [ˈpleːtɛɾjɛ]) is a village west of Lovrenc na Dravskem Polju in the Municipality of Kidričevo in northeastern Slovenia. The area is part of the traditional region of Styria. It is now included with the rest of the municipality in the Drava Statistical Region.

== History ==
The settlement of Pleterje was created in 1952, when the formerly separate villages of Spodnje Pleterje and Zgornje Pleterje were merged into a single settlement.
