= Starošince =

- Location in Slovenia
- Coordinates: 46°25′31.76″N 15°43′43.49″E
- Country: Slovenia
- Traditional region: Styria
- Statistical region: Drava
- Municipality: Kidričevo

Area
  - Total: 3.03 km^{2} (1.17 sq mi)
- Elevation: 247.3 m (811 ft)

Population (2002)
  - Total: 224

Starošince (pronounced [staɾɔˈʃiːntsɛ]) is a village in the Municipality of Kidričevo in northeastern Slovenia. The area is part of the traditional region of Styria. It is now included with the rest of the municipality in the Drava Statistical Region.

The village chapel is dedicated to Saint Mary and belongs to the Parish of Cirkovce. It dates to the early 20th century.
