= Spodnje Jablane =

- Location in Slovenia
- Coordinates: 46°23′36.45″N 15°42′52.8″E
- Country: Slovenia
- Traditional region: Styria
- Statistical region: Drava
- Municipality: Kidričevo

Area
  - Total: 5.16 km^{2} (1.99 sq mi)
- Elevation: 242.6 m (796 ft)

Population (2002)
  - Total: 224

Spodnje Jablane (pronounced [ˈspoːdnjɛ ˈjaːblanɛ], German: Unterjabling) is a village in the Municipality of Kidričevo in northeastern Slovenia. Traditionally the area is part of the Styria region. It is now included with the rest of the municipality in the Drava Statistical Region.
