= Municipality of Kidričevo =

Municipality of Slovenia

Municipality of Kidričevo Občina Kidričevo
- Municipality
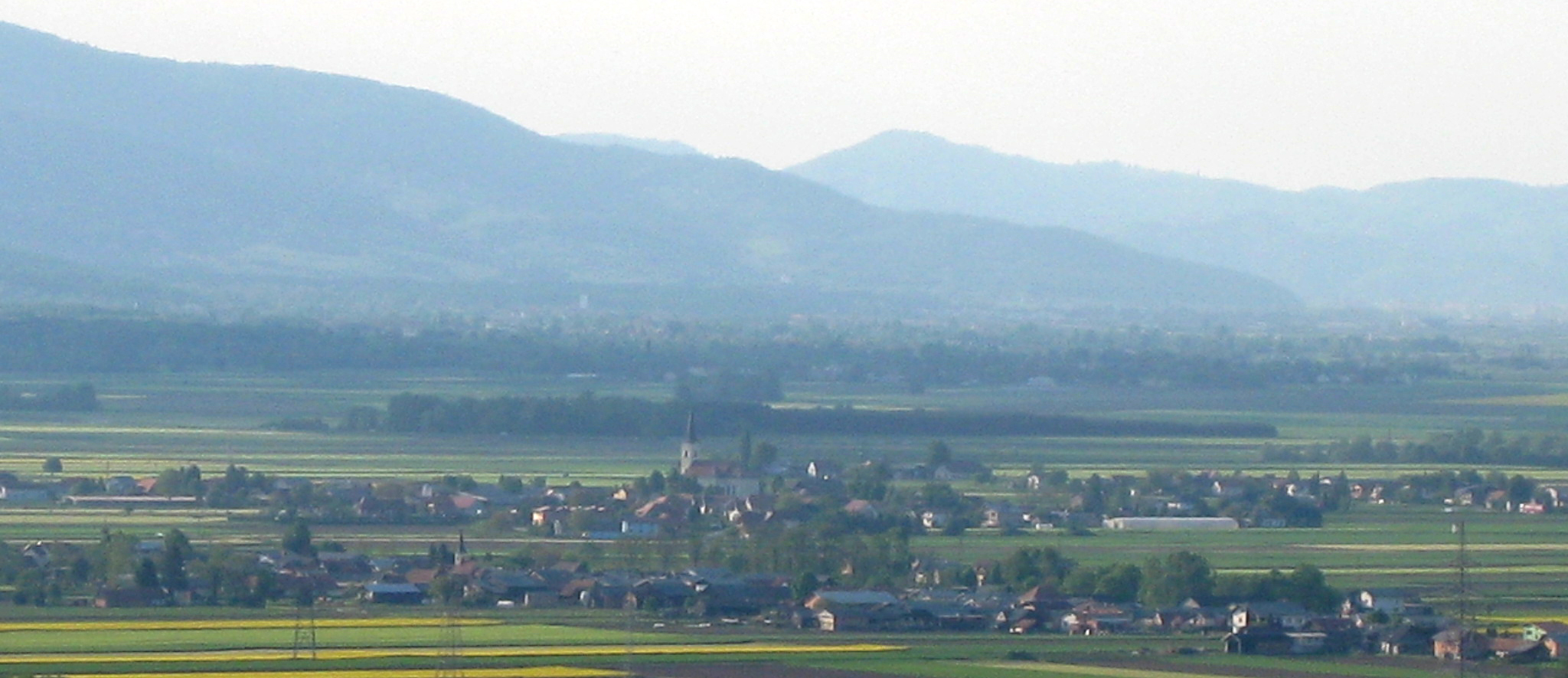

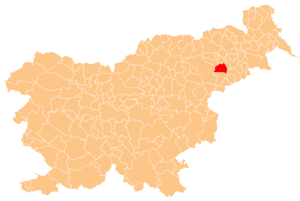
- Location of the Municipality of Kidričevo in Slovenia
- Coordinates: 46°24′N 15°47′E
- Country: Slovenia

Government
  - Mayor: Anton Leskovar (SDS)

Area
  - Total: 71.5 km^{2} (27.6 sq mi)

Population (2002)
  - Total: 6,502
  - Density: 90.9/km^{2} (236/sq mi)
- Time zone: UTC+01 (CET)
  - Summer (DST): UTC+02 (CEST)
- Website: www.kidricevo.si

The Municipality of Kidričevo (pronounced [ˈkiːdɾitʃɛʋɔ]; Slovene: Občina Kidričevo) is a municipality near Ptuj in northeastern Slovenia. The seat of the municipality is the town of Kidričevo. The area is part of the traditional region of Styria. The municipality is now included in the Drava Statistical Region.

== Settlements ==
In addition to the municipal seat of Kidričevo, the municipality also includes the following settlements:

- Apače
- Cirkovce
- Dragonja Vas
- Kungota pri Ptuju
- Lovrenc na Dravskem Polju
- Mihovce
- Njiverce
- Pleterje
- Pongrce
- Šikole
- Spodnje Jablane
- Spodnji Gaj pri Pragerskem
- Starošince
- Stražgonjca
- Strnišče
- Zgornje Jablane
- Župečja Vas
