= Zgornje Jablane =

- Location in Slovenia
- Coordinates: 46°23′45.61″N 15°42′37.47″E
- Country: Slovenia
- Traditional region: Styria
- Statistical region: Drava
- Municipality: Kidričevo

Area
  - Total: 1.5 km^{2} (0.58 sq mi)
- Elevation: 243.5 m (799 ft)

Population (2002)
  - Total: 175

Zgornje Jablane (pronounced [ˈzɡoːɾnjɛ ˈjaːblanɛ], German: Oberjabling) is a settlement in northeastern Slovenia. It belongs to the Municipality of Kidričevo. The area is part of the traditional region of Styria. It is now included with the rest of the municipality in the Drava Statistical Region.
