= Spodnji Gaj pri Pragerskem =

Spodnji Gaj pri Pragerskem Gaj (until 1980)
- Location in Slovenia
- Coordinates: 46°25′50.8″N 15°46′54.49″E
- Country: Slovenia
- Traditional region: Styria
- Statistical region: Drava
- Municipality: Kidričevo

Area
  - Total: 0.22 km^{2} (0.085 sq mi)
- Elevation: 239.9 m (787 ft)

Population (2002)
  - Total: 133

Spodnji Gaj pri Pragerskem (pronounced [ˈspoːdnji ˈɡaːi̯ pɾi ˈpɾaːɡɛɾskɛm]) is a small settlement just east of Pragersko in northeastern Slovenia. It belongs to the Municipality of Kidričevo. The area is part of the traditional region of Styria. It is now included with the rest of the municipality in the Drava Statistical Region.

== History ==
The settlement was split off from Gaj (under the designation Gaj – del 'part of Gaj') in the neighboring Municipality of Slovenska Bistrica in 1980 and named Spodnji Gaj pri Pragerskem.
