= Stražgonjca =

- Location in Slovenia
- Coordinates: 46°24′22.33″N 15°41′26.78″E
- Country: Slovenia
- Traditional region: Styria
- Statistical region: Drava
- Municipality: Kidričevo

Area
  - Total: 3.01 km^{2} (1.16 sq mi)
- Elevation: 246.2 m (808 ft)

Population (2002)
  - Total: 180

Stražgonjca (pronounced [stɾaʒˈɡoːntsa]) is a settlement in the Municipality of Kidričevo in northeastern Slovenia. It lies northeast of Pragersko on Črnec Creek. The area is part of the traditional region of Styria. It is now included with the rest of the municipality in the Drava Statistical Region.
