= Sterntal camp =

Coordinates: 46°23′39″N 15°47′52″E

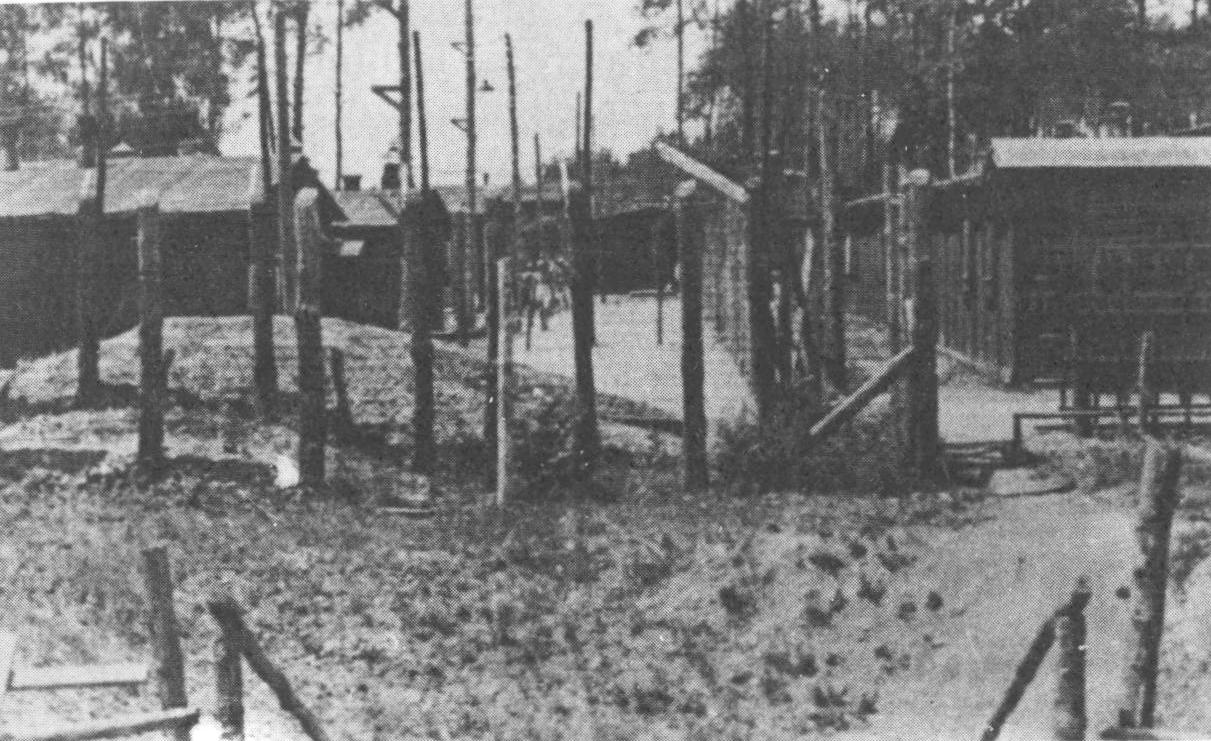
Sterntal Camp

The Sterntal Camp (Slovene: Taborišče Šterntal, German: Lager Sterntal) was a Titoist concentration camp located in Kidričevo, Slovenia. It was a central collection point for the expulsion of ethnic German Danube Swabians from Yugoslavia after the Second World War.

The roots of the camp go back to a prisoner of war camp from the First World War, later used as a refugee camp for people displaced by the Battles of the Isonzo. In 1941, the German occupation authorities (German: CdZ-Gebiet Untersteiermark) established a concentration camp at the site to provide labor to build an aluminum smelter (the plant was not completed until 1947–1954). At the beginning of 1942, the camp contained 1,076 workers, 185 criminal internees, and 89 prisoners of war. In 1944, family members of deserters were also forced to work at the camp. In May 1945, under the direction of Aleksandar Ranković, the Yugoslav secret police (OZNA) established a concentration camp at the site to collect ethnic Germans from across Slovenia, especially from Lower Styria and Gottschee. Ethnic Hungarians from Prekmurje were also sent to the camp. Overcrowding and poor hygiene at the camp caused many of the inmates to die from amoebiasis and typhoid fever. The inmates were also physically and mentally tortured, and many were shot. Tortures included forcing the prisoners to lie on the ground while their captors rode motorcycles over them. The deaths included large numbers of the elderly and young children; some accounts state that no children under the age of two survived. The camp, which was designed to accommodate 2,000 people, contained between 8,000 and 12,000 prisoners. Up to 5,000 people died at the camp. The Sterntal Concentration Camp was closed down in October 1945 through the efforts of the Red Cross, and most of the survivors were sent to Austria.
