= Dragonja Vas =

- Location in Slovenia
- Coordinates: 46°23′10.21″N 15°43′44.88″E
- Country: Slovenia
- Traditional region: Styria
- Statistical region: Drava
- Municipality: Kidričevo

Area
  - Total: 2.59 km^{2} (1.00 sq mi)
- Elevation: 240 m (790 ft)

Population (2002)
  - Total: 174

Dragonja Vas (pronounced [dɾaˈɡoːnja ˈʋaːs]; Slovene: Dragonja vas, in older sources Zdergonja ves, German: Drasendorf) is a small village in the Municipality of Kidričevo in northeastern Slovenia. The area is part of the traditional region of Styria and is now included with the rest of the municipality in the Drava Statistical Region.

== Name ==
Dragonja Vas was first attested in early sources as Zdragona or Sdragona (between 1763 and 1787). The name is derived from a Slavic personal name, either from *Dragon’a vьsь 'Dragonъ's village' or (with dialect -o- < -a-) from *Dragan’a vьsь 'Draganъ's village'. In either case, both personal names are based on the root *dôrgъ 'dear'.
