= Kungota pri Ptuju =

Kungota pri Ptuju Sveta Kungota (until 1955)
- Village
- Location in Slovenia
- Coordinates: 46°25′50.8″N 15°46′54.49″E
- Country: Slovenia
- Traditional region: Styria
- Statistical region: Drava
- Municipality: Kidričevo

Area
  - Total: 2.64 km^{2} (1.02 sq mi)
- Elevation: 239.9 m (787 ft)

Population (2002)
  - Total: 386

Kungota pri Ptuju (pronounced [ˈkuːŋɡɔta pɾi ˈptuːju], in older sources Sveta Jungert, German: Sankt Kunigund) is a village in the Municipality of Kidričevo in northeastern Slovenia. The area is part of the traditional region of Styria. It is now included with the rest of the municipality in the Drava Statistical Region.

== Name ==
The name of the settlement was changed from Sveta Kungota (literally, 'Saint Cunigunde') to Kungota pri Ptuju (literally, 'Cunigunde near Ptuj') in 1955. The name was changed on the basis of the 1948 Law on Names of Settlements and Designations of Squares, Streets, and Buildings as part of efforts by Slovenia's postwar communist government to remove religious elements from toponyms.

== Church ==
The local church, from which the settlement gets its name, is dedicated to Saint Cunigunde and belongs to the Parish of Hajdina. It dates to the 14th century with numerous later additions and adaptations.
