= Strnišče, Kidričevo =

Strnišče
- Location in Slovenia
- Coordinates: 46°23′58.14″N 15°46′13.46″E
- Country: Slovenia
- Traditional region: Styria
- Statistical region: Drava
- Municipality: Kidričevo

Area
  - Total: 4.91 km^{2} (1.90 sq mi)
- Elevation: 239.6 m (786 ft)

Population (2002)
  - Total: 105

Strnišče (pronounced [stəɾˈniːʃtʃɛ], in older sources sometimes Sternišče) is a small settlement south of Kidričevo in northeastern Slovenia. It is the western part of the settlement of the same name that became Kidričevo after the Second World War. The area is part of the traditional region of Styria. It is now included with the rest of the Municipality of Kidričevo in the Drava Statistical Region.

== Name ==
The name Strnišče is based on the older German name Sternthal and appeared in print by 1895. The traditional Slovene name for the settlement was Prelogi. Davorin Žunkovič derives the name Sternthal from Sterenstall 'wether pen' (cf. MHG stër(e) 'wether'), referring to sheep that were formerly kept there.
