= Bakovnik =

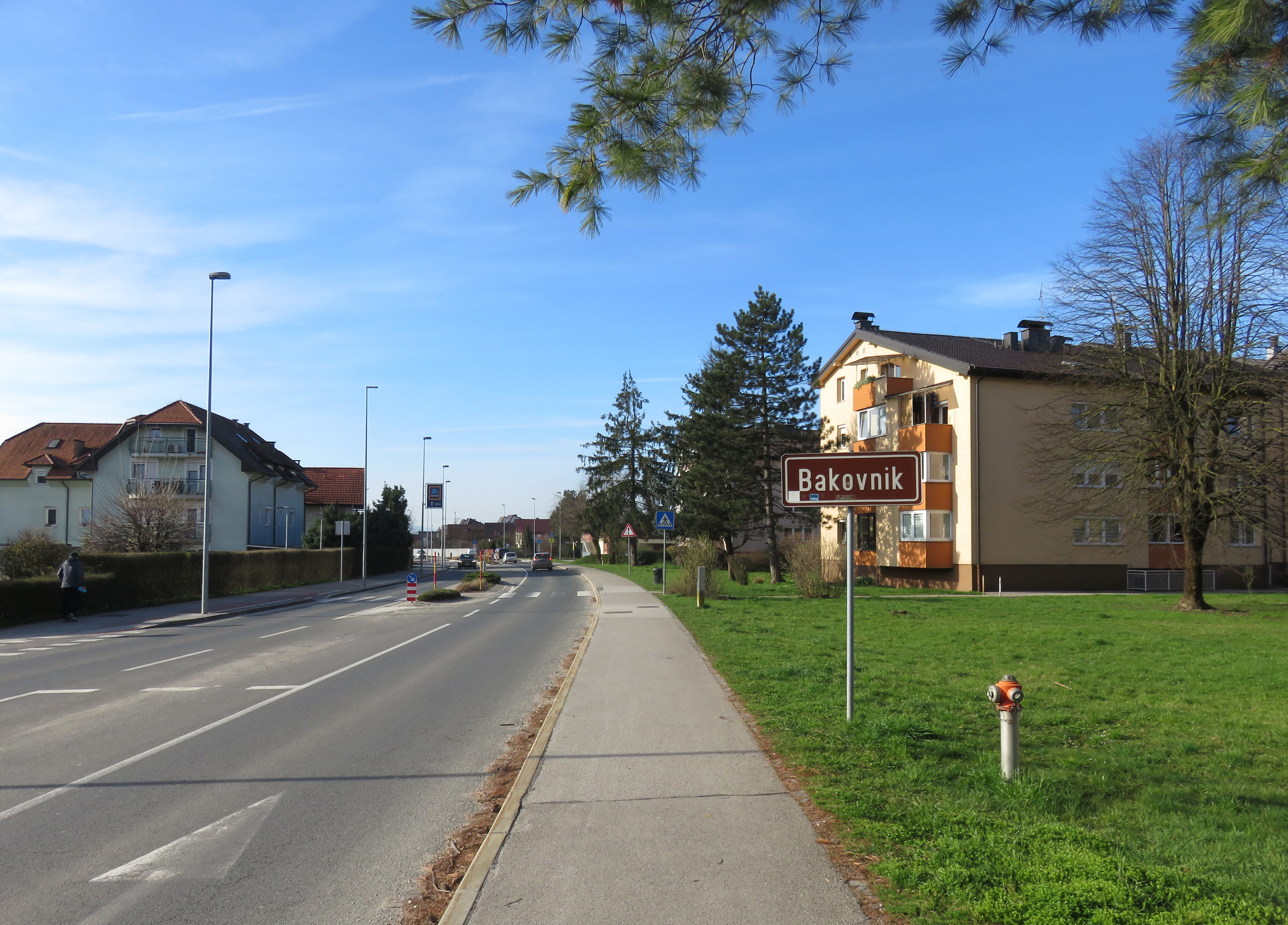

- Location in Slovenia
- Coordinates: 46°12′33″N 14°35′59″E
- Country: Slovenia
- Traditional region: Upper Carniola
- Statistical region: Central Slovenia
- Municipality: Kamnik
- Elevation: 362 m (1,188 ft)

Bakovnik (pronounced [ˈbaːkɔu̯nik], German: Bakounik) is a former settlement in the Municipality of Kamnik in central Slovenia. It is now part of the town of Kamnik. The area is part of the traditional region of Upper Carniola. The municipality is now included in the Central Slovenia Statistical Region.

== Geography ==
Bakovnik lies south of Kamnik, between Duplica and Perovo, above the right bank of the Kamnik Bistrica River.

== History ==
Bakovnik was annexed by Kamnik in 1934, ending its existence as an independent settlement. Bakovnik quickly urbanized after its annexation and lost its original agricultural character.
