= Pongrce =

- Location in Slovenia
- Coordinates: 46°23′58.64″N 15°42′25.94″E
- Country: Slovenia
- Traditional region: Styria
- Statistical region: Drava
- Municipality: Kidričevo

Area
  - Total: 3.08 km^{2} (1.19 sq mi)
- Elevation: 244.4 m (802 ft)

Population (2002)
  - Total: 133

Pongrce (pronounced [pɔŋˈɡəɾtsɛ]) is a small village in the Municipality of Kidričevo in northeastern Slovenia. The area is part of the traditional region of Styria. It is now included with the rest of the municipality in the Drava Statistical Region.

A small chapel in the centre of the settlement was built in the early 20th century. Its location under two large linden trees makes it a dominant feature in the village landscape.
