= Šikole =

- Location in Slovenia
- Coordinates: 46°24′18.55″N 15°41′51.17″E
- Country: Slovenia
- Traditional region: Styria
- Statistical region: Drava
- Municipality: Kidričevo

Area
  - Total: 5.59 km^{2} (2.16 sq mi)
- Elevation: 245.7 m (806 ft)

Population (2002)
  - Total: 311

Šikole (pronounced [ʃiˈkoːlɛ]) is a village in the Municipality of Kidričevo in northeastern Slovenia. The area is part of the traditional region of Styria. It is now included with the rest of the municipality in the Drava Statistical Region.

== Name ==
Šikole was first attested in written sources in 1374 as Sycolach (and as Sykhawlou in 1441 and Sycolach in 1493). The name is derived from *Šikovľ(an)e, probably based on the root *šik- (cf. Slovene šikara 'thicket, bushes' and Kostel dialect šikara 'steep area difficult to access'), referring to a local geographical feature.

== Religious heritage ==
The village chapel is a Neo-Gothic structure, built in the late 19th century.
