= Mihovce =

- Location in Slovenia
- Coordinates: 46°23′7.16″N 15°44′6.37″E
- Country: Slovenia
- Traditional region: Styria
- Statistical region: Drava
- Municipality: Kidričevo

Area
  - Total: 5.1 km^{2} (2.0 sq mi)
- Elevation: 239.9 m (787 ft)

Population (2002)
  - Total: 224

Mihovce (pronounced [ˈmiːxɔu̯tsɛ]) is a village in the Municipality of Kidričevo in northeastern Slovenia. The area is part of the traditional region of Styria. It is now included with the rest of the municipality in the Drava Statistical Region.

The local church is dedicated to Saint Anthony of Padua and belongs to the Parish of Cirkovce. It dates to the 17th century but was extensively rebuilt after a fire in 1857.
