= Župečja Vas =

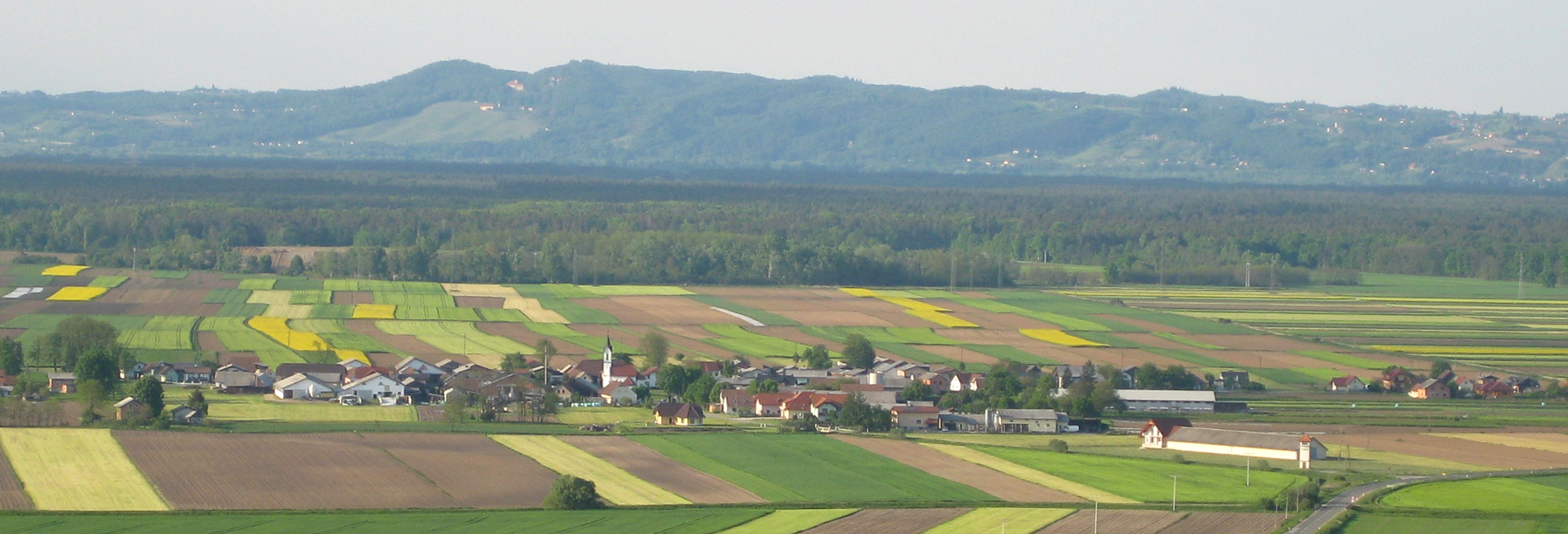

- Location in Slovenia
- Coordinates: 46°22′34.33″N 15°46′1.52″E
- Country: Slovenia
- Traditional region: Styria
- Statistical region: Drava
- Municipality: Kidričevo

Area
  - Total: 2.25 km^{2} (0.87 sq mi)
- Elevation: 236.4 m (776 ft)

Population (2002)
  - Total: 251

Župečja Vas (pronounced [ʒuˈpeːtʃja ˈʋaːs]; Slovene: Župečja vas) is a village in the Municipality of Kidričevo in northeastern Slovenia. The area is part of the traditional region of Styria. It is now included with the rest of the municipality in the Drava Statistical Region.

The local church is dedicated to Saint Anthony the Hermit and belongs to the Parish of Sveti Lovrenc. It was built in 1910 in the Neo-Gothic style.
