= Dobje, Grosuplje =

Dobje
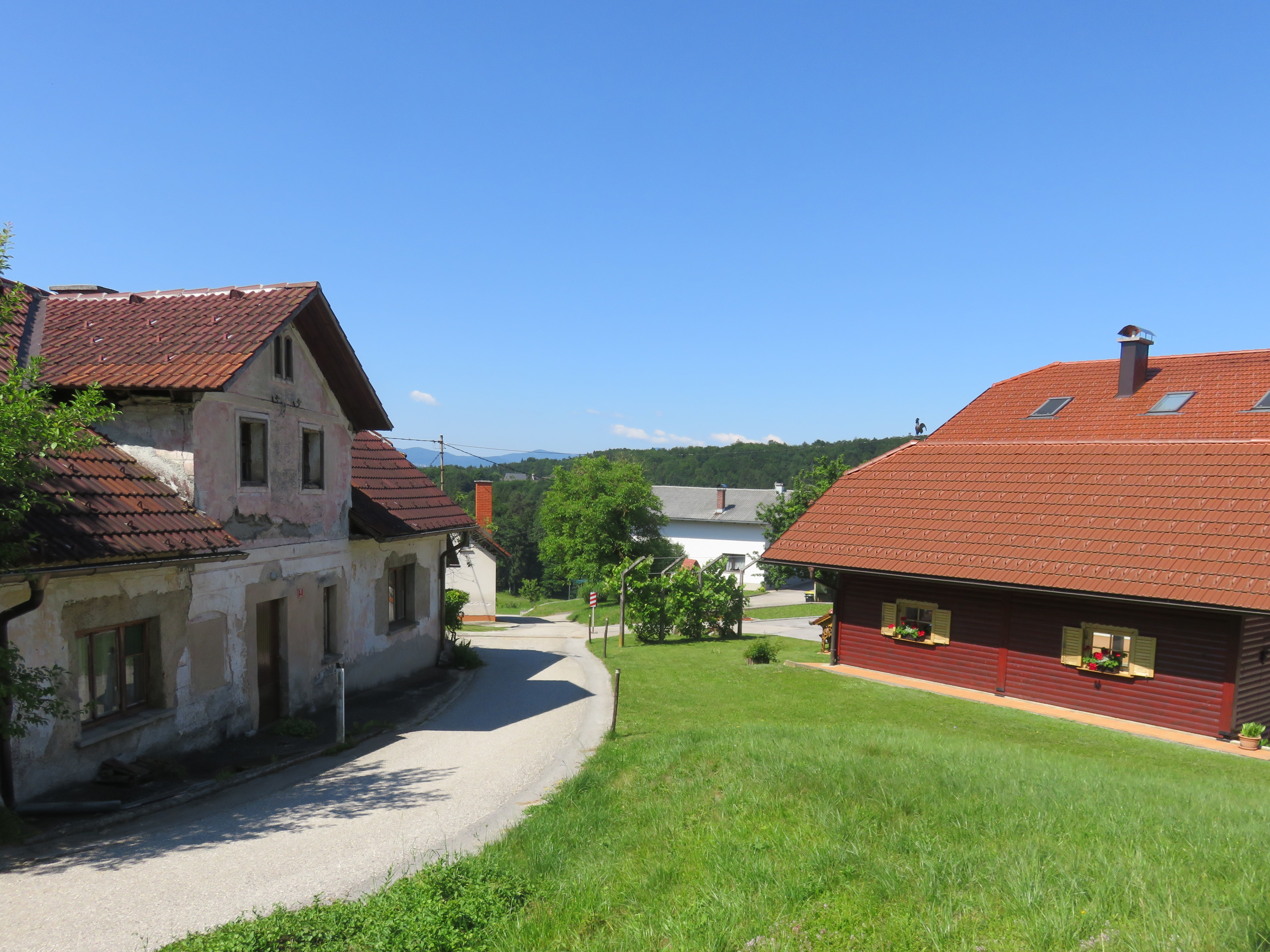

- Location in Slovenia
- Coordinates: 45°58′43.4″N 14°39′50.6″E
- Country: Slovenia
- Traditional region: Lower Carniola
- Statistical region: Central Slovenia
- Municipality: Grosuplje

Area
  - Total: 0.95 km^{2} (0.37 sq mi)
- Elevation: 395.1 m (1,296 ft)

Population (2002)
  - Total: 22

Dobje (pronounced [ˈdoːbjɛ]) is a small settlement in the Municipality of Grosuplje in central Slovenia. It lies in the hills north of the town of Grosuplje in the historical region of Lower Carniola. The municipality is now included in the Central Slovenia Statistical Region.

== Geography ==
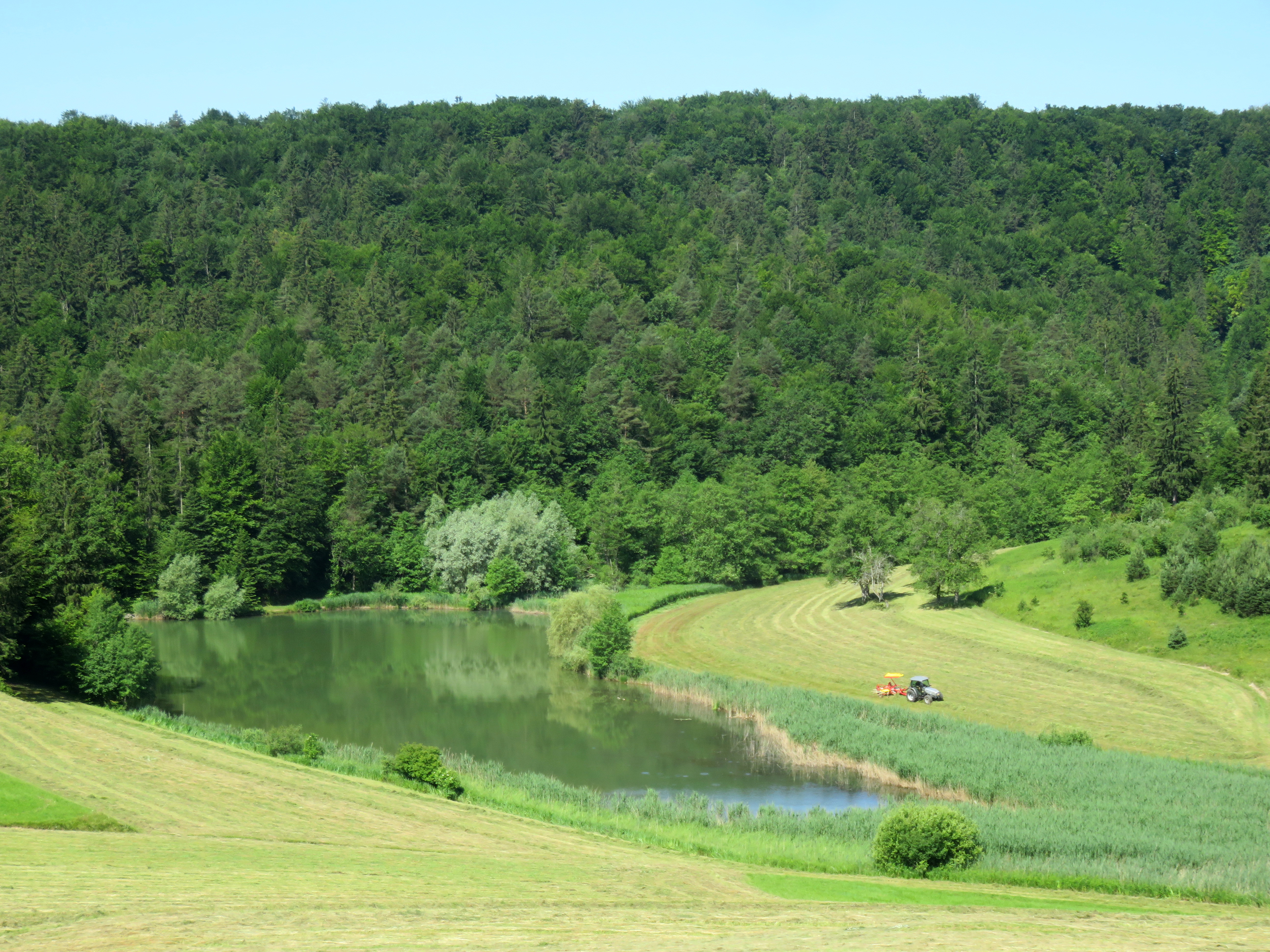
Dobje Pond

Dobje Pond (Slovene: Ribnik Dobje) lies west of the village center of Dobje, along the upper course of Breg Creek.

== History ==
Dobje became an independent settlement in 1992, when it was administratively separated from Mala Stara Vas.
