= Sela pri Šmarju =

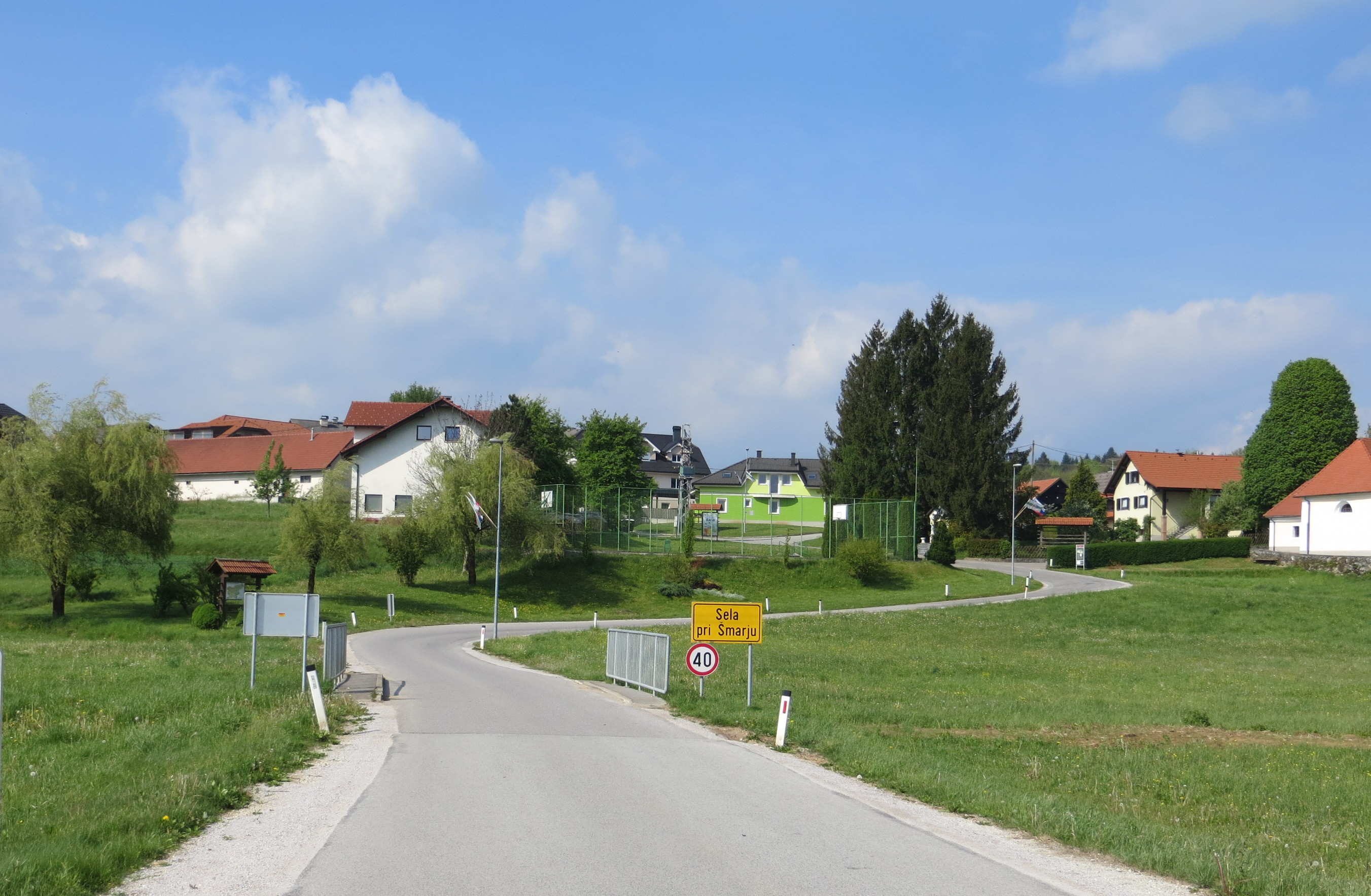

- Location in Slovenia
- Coordinates: 45°57′45.4″N 14°37′46.51″E
- Country: Slovenia
- Traditional region: Lower Carniola
- Statistical region: Central Slovenia
- Municipality: Grosuplje

Area
  - Total: 2.1 km^{2} (0.81 sq mi)
- Elevation: 343.5 m (1,127 ft)

Population (2002)
  - Total: 153

Sela pri Šmarju (pronounced [ˈseːla pɾi ˈʃmaːɾju]; in older sources also Selo, German: Sela) is a small village in the Municipality of Grosuplje in central Slovenia. It lies between Grosuplje and Šmarje-Sap in the historical region of Lower Carniola. The municipality is now included in the Central Slovenia Statistical Region.

== Name ==
The name of the settlement was changed from Sela to Sela pri Šmarju in 1955.

== Church ==
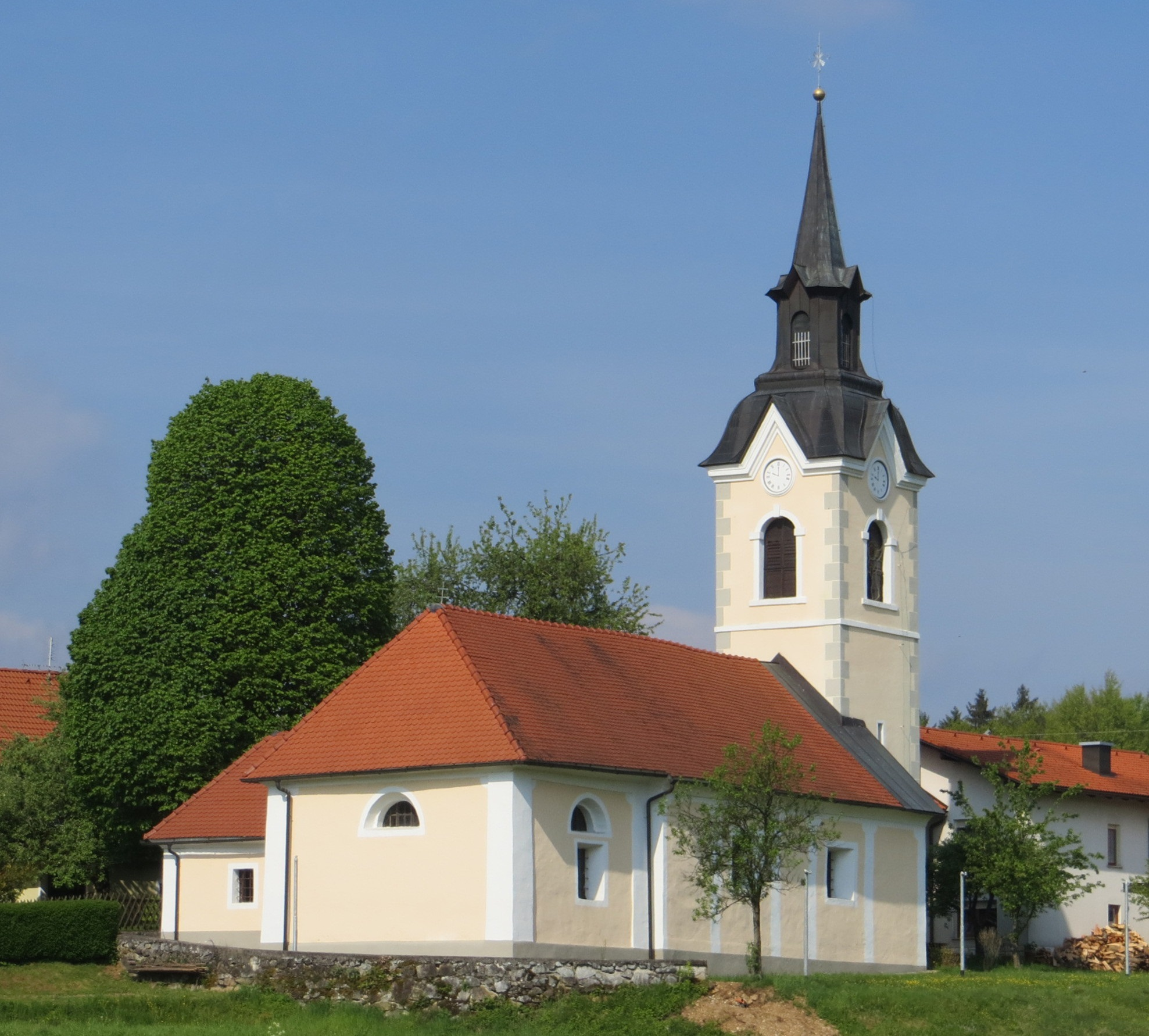
Saints Hermagoras and Fortunatus Church

The local church is dedicated to Saints Hermagoras and Fortunatus and belongs to the Parish of Šmarje–Sap. It was first mentioned in written documents dating to 1444 and was restyled in the Baroque in the second half of the 18th century.
