= Šmarca =

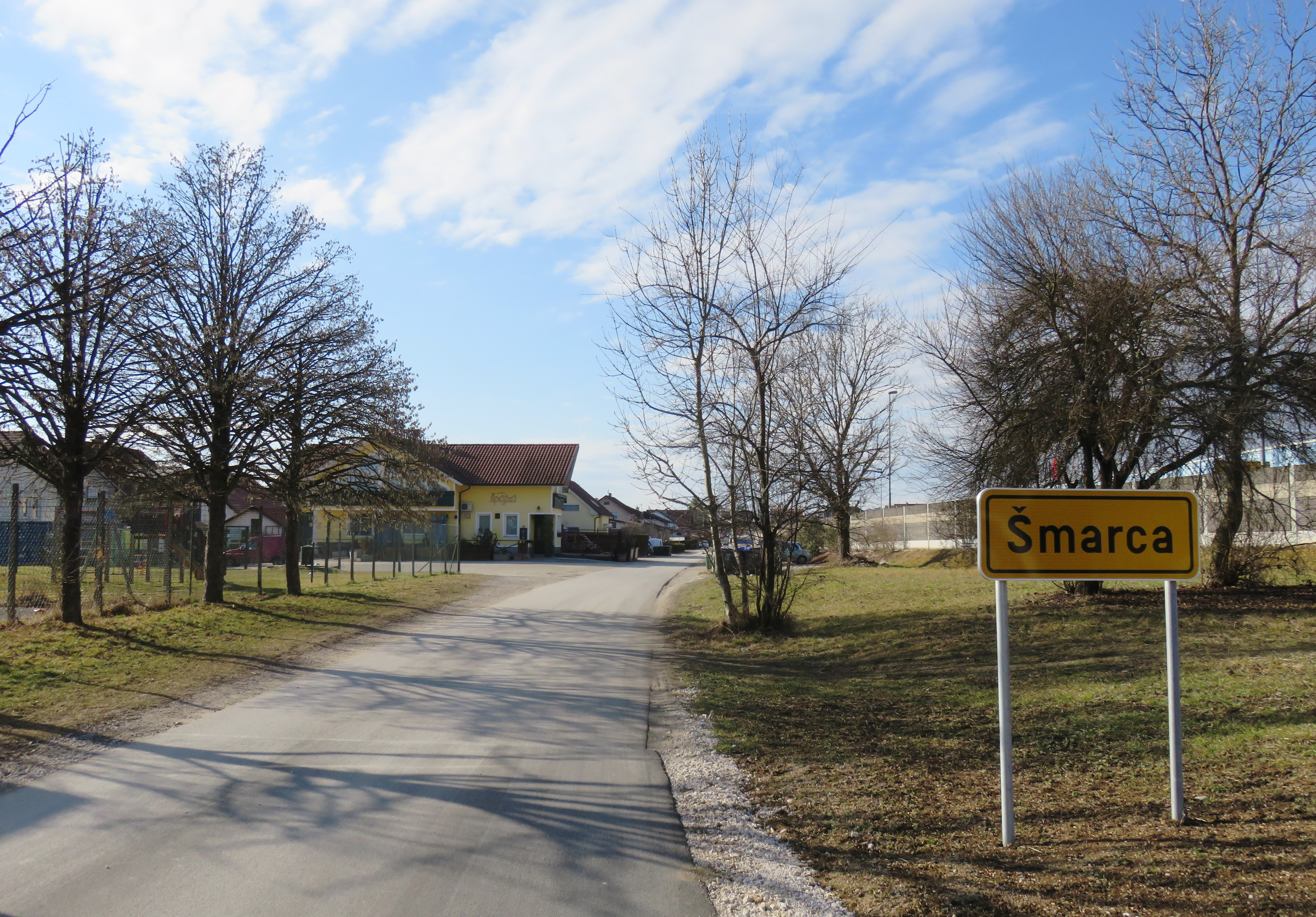

- Location in Slovenia
- Coordinates: 46°11′49.73″N 14°35′47.02″E
- Country: Slovenia
- Traditional region: Upper Carniola
- Statistical region: Central Slovenia
- Municipality: Kamnik

Area
  - Total: 1.7 km^{2} (0.66 sq mi)
- Elevation: 348.7 m (1,144 ft)

Population (2002)
  - Total: 1,365

Šmarca (pronounced [ˈʃmaːɾtsa]; German: Schmarza) is a settlement just south of Kamnik, on the right bank of the Kamnik Bistrica River, in the Upper Carniola region of Slovenia.

The settlement was first mentioned in documents dating to 1359. The parish church in the settlement is dedicated to Saint Maurice.
