= Kidričevo =

Kidričevo Strnišče (until 1953)
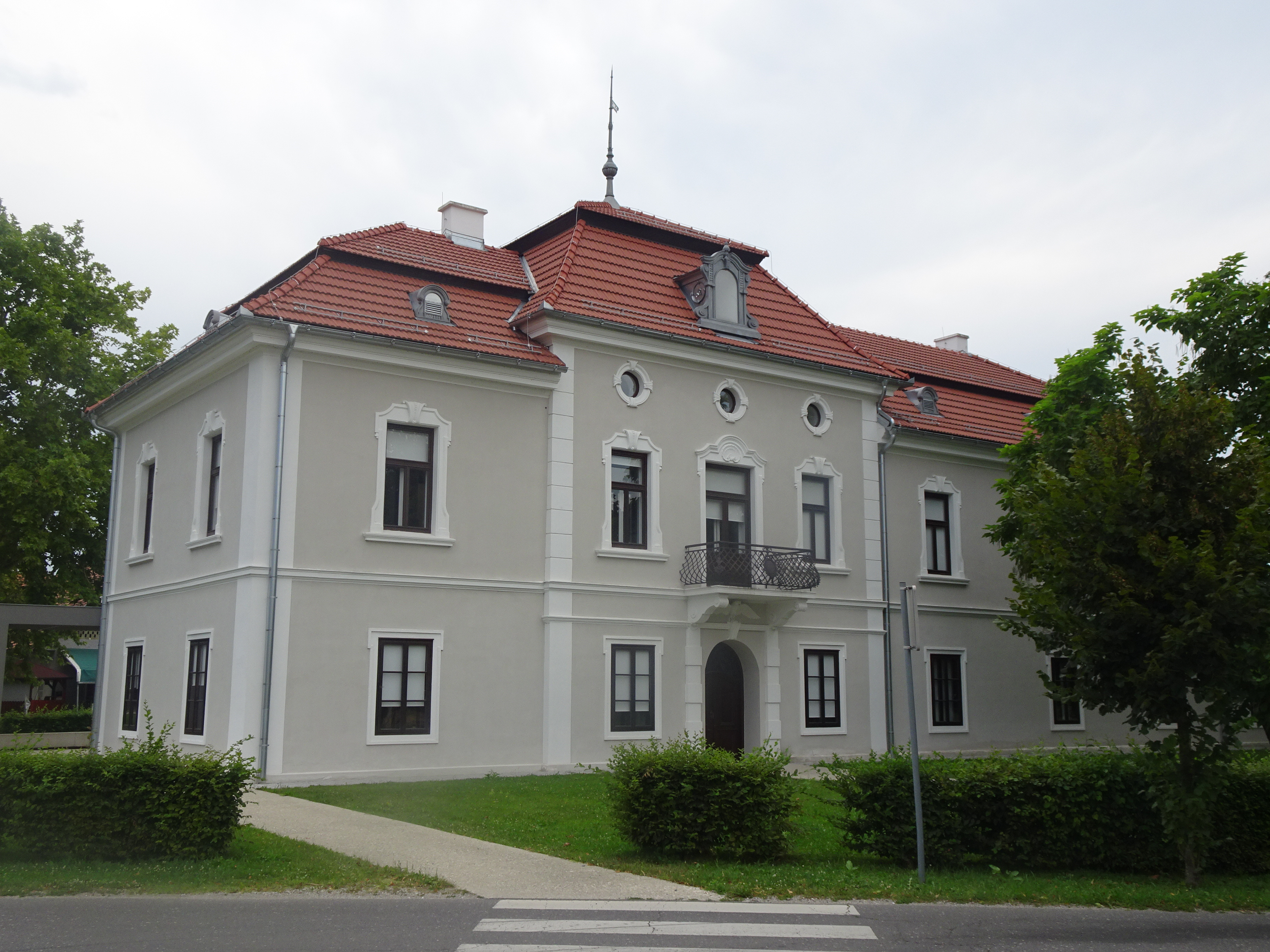
- Kidričevo Mansion

- Location in Slovenia
- Coordinates: 46°24′21.61″N 15°47′53.90″E
- Country: Slovenia
- Traditional region: Styria
- Statistical region: Drava
- Municipality: Kidričevo

Area
  - Total: 7.10 km^{2} (2.74 sq mi)
- Elevation: 238.5 m (782 ft)

Population (2012)
  - Total: 1,257

Kidričevo (pronounced [ˈkiːdɾitʃɛʋɔ]) is a town near Ptuj in northeastern Slovenia. It is the seat of the Municipality of Kidričevo. The area is part of the traditional region of Styria. The municipality is now included in the Drava Statistical Region. The town is industrialized and best known for the Talum aluminum-smelting factory. The town developed due to the industry in the area and is an example of urban planning in the late 1940s, 1950s, and 1960s.

== Name ==
The historical settlement that the town was built around was called Strnišče. In 1947, a workers' housing development at the site was renamed Kidričevo after Boris Kidrič, a leading Slovenian communist and one of the chief organizers of the Partisan movement in Slovenia from 1941 to 1945. The entire village of Strnišče was renamed Kidričevo in 1953. In 1974, territory was separated from the settlements of Kidričevo and Župečja Vas to create the current settlement of Strnišče.

== Sterntal Concentration Camp ==
The Sterntal Concentration Camp (Slovene: Taborišče Šterntal, German: Lager Sterntal) was located in Kidričevo. It was a central collection point for the expulsion of ethnic Germans from Slovenia (Ostsiedlung) after the Second World War. The roots of the camp go back to a prisoner of war camp from the First World War, later used as a refugee camp for people displaced by the Battles of the Isonzo. In 1941, following annexation, the German authorities (German: CdZ-Gebiet Untersteiermark) established a prisoner of war camp at the site to provide labor to build an aluminum smelter (the plant was not completed until 1947–1954, using forced labor by political prisoners from postwar camps). At the beginning of 1942, the camp contained 1,076 workers, 185 criminal internees, and 89 prisoners of war. In 1944, family members of deserters were also forced to work at the camp. In May 1945, under the direction of Aleksandar Ranković, the Yugoslav secret police (OZNA) established a concentration camp at the site to collect ethnic Germans from across Slovenia, especially from Lower Styria and Gottschee. Ethnic Hungarians from Prekmurje were also sent to the camp. Overcrowding and poor hygiene at the camp caused many of the inmates to die from amoebiasis and typhoid fever. The inmates were also physically and mentally tortured, and many were shot. Tortures included forcing the prisoners to lie on the ground while their captors rode motorcycles over them. The deaths included large numbers of the elderly and young children; some accounts state that no children under the age of two survived. The camp, which was designed to accommodate 2,000 people, contained between 8,000 and 12,000 prisoners. Up to 5,000 people died at the camp. The Sterntal Concentration Camp was closed down in October 1945 through the efforts of the Red Cross, and most of the survivors were sent to Austria.

== Mass graves ==
Kidričevo is the site of two mass graves connected with the Sterntal Concentration Camp. The Sterntal 1 Mass Grave (Slovene: Grobišče Sterntal 1) was uncovered in the 1980s during excavation work at the Talum factory. The remains were removed and disposed of in an undocumented manner. The grave is located in a meadow behind the factory. The Sterntal 2 Mass Grave (Grobišče Sterntal 2) contains the bodies of prisoners from the Sterntal concentration camp. It is located in a pine grove opposite the entrance to the former camp, about 50 meters (160 ft) from the road.
