= Perovo, Kamnik =

Perovo
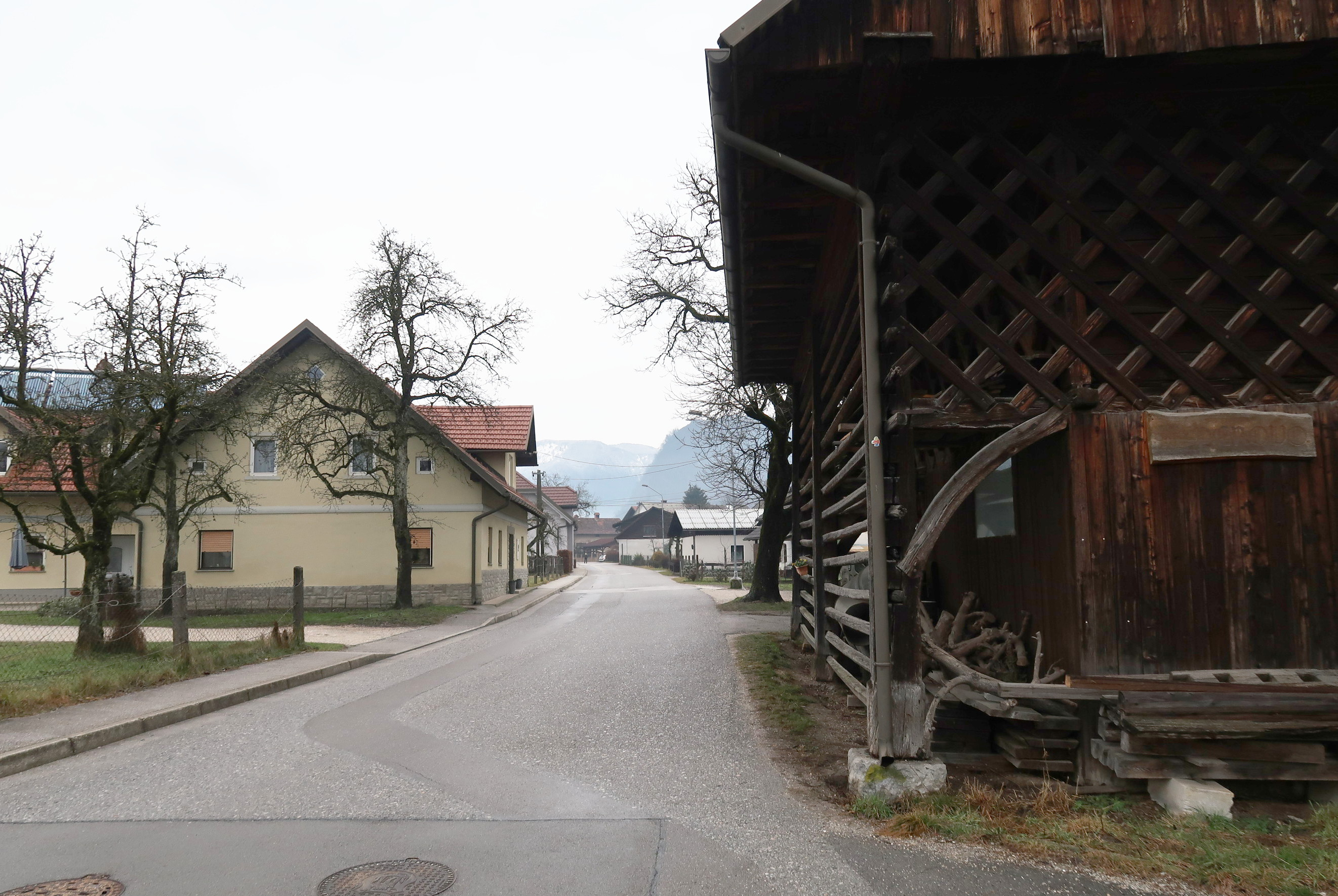

- Location in Slovenia
- Coordinates: 46°12′53″N 14°36′25″E
- Country: Slovenia
- Traditional region: Upper Carniola
- Statistical region: Central Slovenia
- Municipality: Kamnik
- Elevation: 367 m (1,204 ft)

Perovo (pronounced [pɛˈɾoːʋɔ]; German: Perau) is a former settlement in the Municipality of Kamnik in central Slovenia. It is now part of the town of Kamnik. The area is part of the traditional region of Upper Carniola. The municipality is now included in the Central Slovenia Statistical Region.

== Geography ==
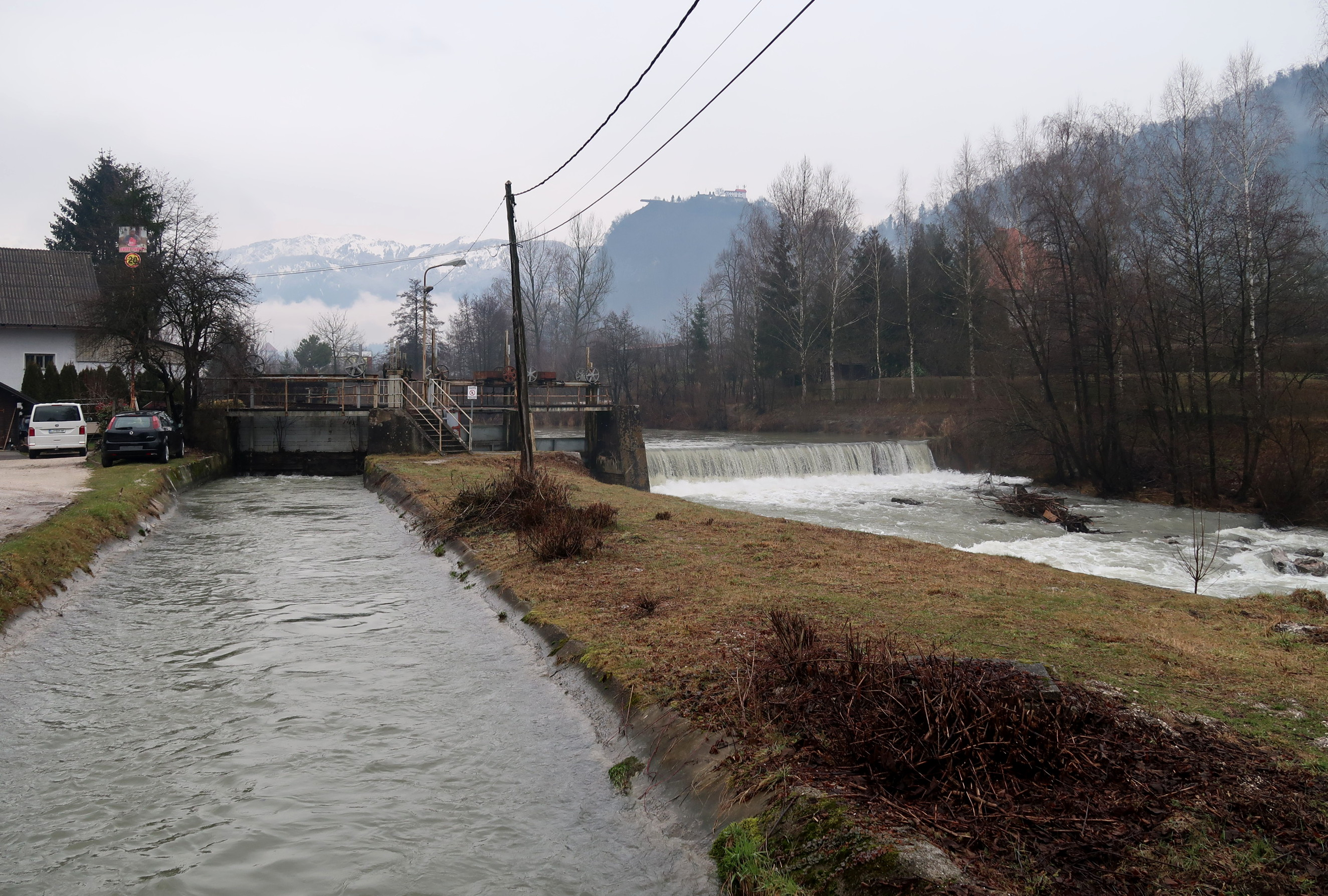
The Kamnik Bistrica River (right) in Perovo with the Titan Industrial Channel (left)

Perovo lies south of Kamnik, between Zaprice and Bakovnik. The settlement is divided into two parts. The main settlement, Spodnje Perovo ('lower Perovo', German: Unterperau) lies along the right bank of the Kamnik Bistrica River. A smaller hamlet, Zgornje Perovo ('upper Perovo', German: Oberperau), lies to the southeast on the other side of the river, on a hillside where the headwaters of Krajček Creek flow.

The Titan Industrial Channel (Titanov kanal) was dug parallel to the Kamnik Bistrica in 1920 to power the Titan Hydroelectric Plant. The channel is lined with concrete and has a flow capacity of 5.1 cubic meters per second (180 cu ft/s), which is about two-thirds of the mean annual flow of the Kamnik Bistrica.

== Name ==
Perovo was mentioned in historical sources as Perau prope Stein in 1241.

== History ==
Perovo was annexed by Kamnik in 1934, ending its existence as an independent settlement.

== Perovo manors ==
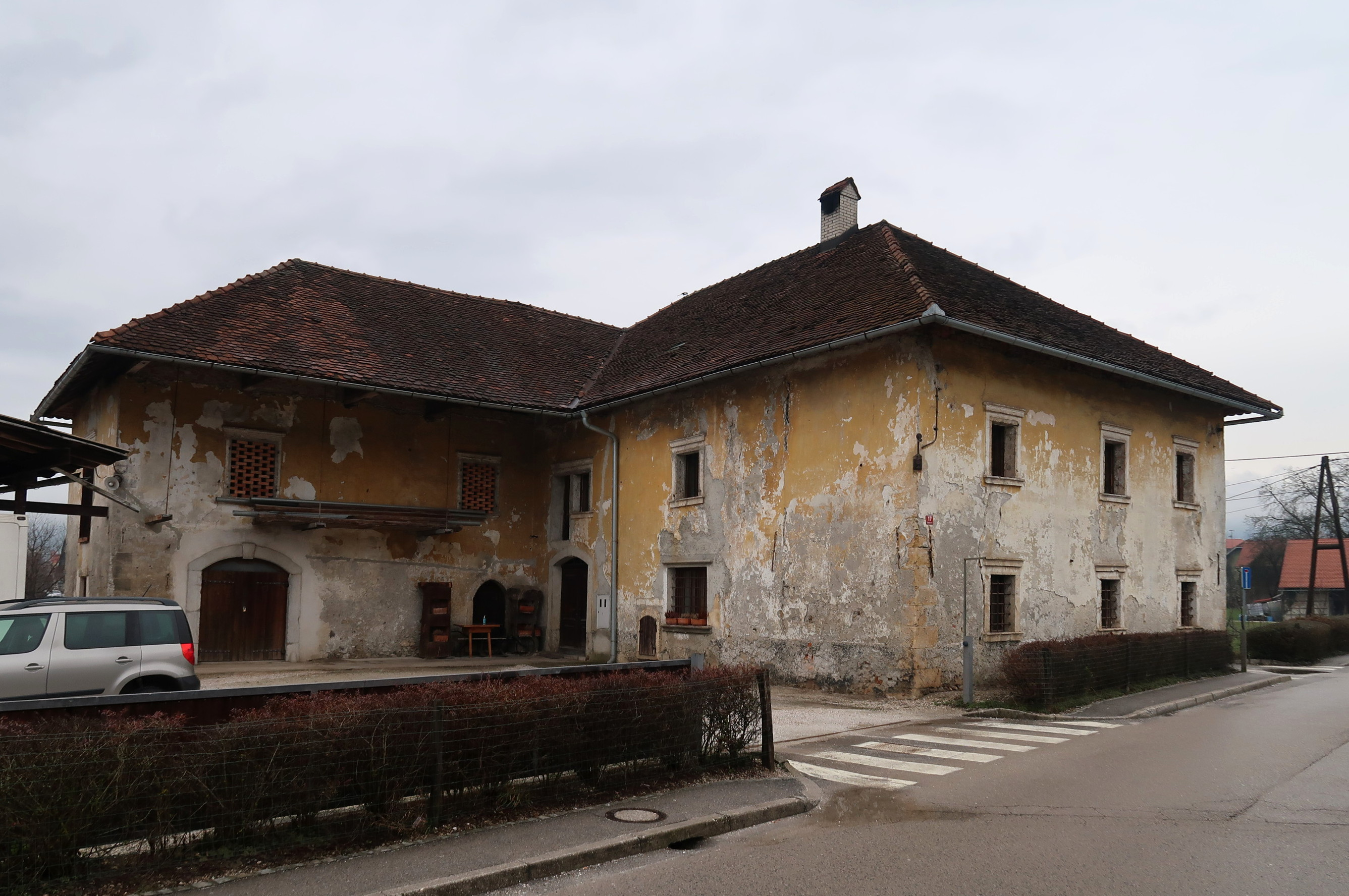
Spodnje Perovo Manor

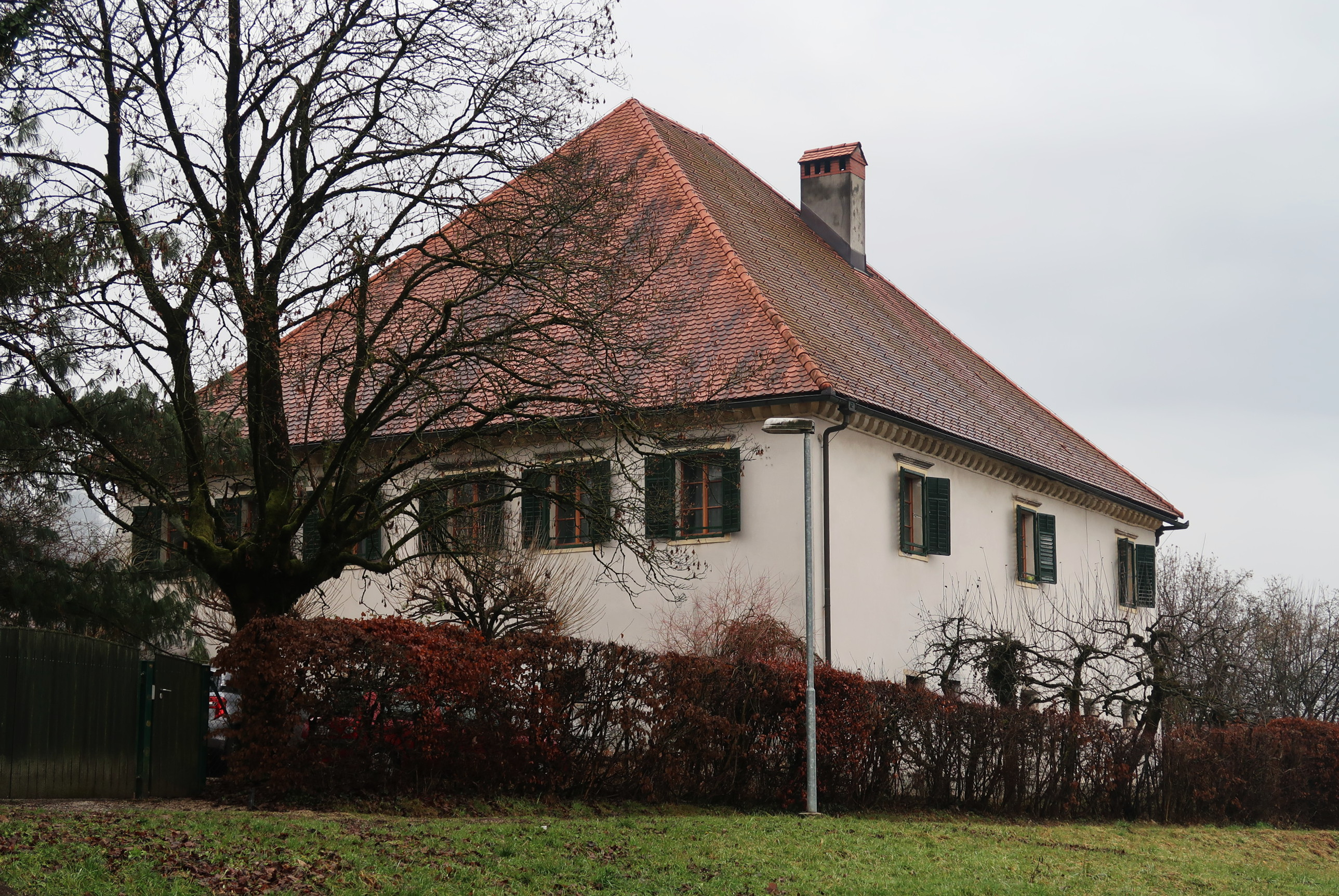
Zgornje Perovo Manor

Manors in Perovo

Spodnje Perovo Manor (dvorec Spodnje Perovo)—also known as Janežič Manor (Janežičeva graščina), Perau Manor, or Rasp Manor (Raspov dvorec)—stands in the northwest part of Spodnje Perovo. It was built by the Rasp family in the first half of the 17th century at the site of a medieval manor, and it has been remodeled several times since then. It is an L-shaped two-story structure that preserves Baroque architectural elements, including the door casing and window frames.

Zgornje Perovo Manor (dvorec Zgornje Perovo)—also known as Šmolc Manor (Šmolčeva graščina), Oberperau Manor, or Tomšič Manor (Tomšičeva graščina)—stands across the river from Spodnje Perovo Manor in the hamlet of Zgornje Perovo. It is a two-story building dating from the 15th century. The windows on the ground floor preserve Gothic elements, and those on the upper floor have Baroque elements.

== Notable people ==
Notable people that were born or lived in Perovo include the following:

- France Lombergar (1928–1993), agronomist and orchard specialist
