= Perovo, Gus-Khrustalny District, Vladimir Oblast =

Perovo Перово
- Village
- Location within Vladimir Oblast Location within Russia
- Coordinates: 55°26′N 40°22′E
- Country: Russia
- Region: Vladimir Oblast
- District: Gus-Khrustalny District
- Time zone: UTC+3:00

Perovo (Russian: Перово) is a rural locality (a village) in Demidovskoye Rural Settlement, Gus-Khrustalny District, Vladimir Oblast, Russia. The population was 328 as of 2010. There are 4 streets.

== Geography ==
Perovo is located 34 km southwest of Gus-Khrustalny (the district's administrative centre) by road. Chaslitsy is the nearest rural locality.
