= Apače, Kidričevo =

Apače
- Location in Slovenia
- Coordinates: 46°22′35.09″N 15°47′39″E
- Country: Slovenia
- Traditional region: Styria
- Statistical region: Drava
- Municipality: Kidričevo

Area
  - Total: 5.61 km^{2} (2.17 sq mi)
- Elevation: 234.3 m (769 ft)

Population (2002)
  - Total: 785

Apače (pronounced [ˈáːpatʃɛ], German: Amtmannsdorf) is a settlement in the Municipality of Kidričevo in northeastern Slovenia. The area is part of the traditional region of Styria. It is now included with the rest of the municipality in the Drava Statistical Region.

== Name ==
The name Apače is derived from *Apaťe (selo) 'abbot's village', referring to territory that was owned by an abbot or an abbey. Names with a similar motivation include Opatje Selo in Slovenia, Apatovec and Opatija in Croatia, and Apatin in Serbia.
