= Mala Stara Vas =

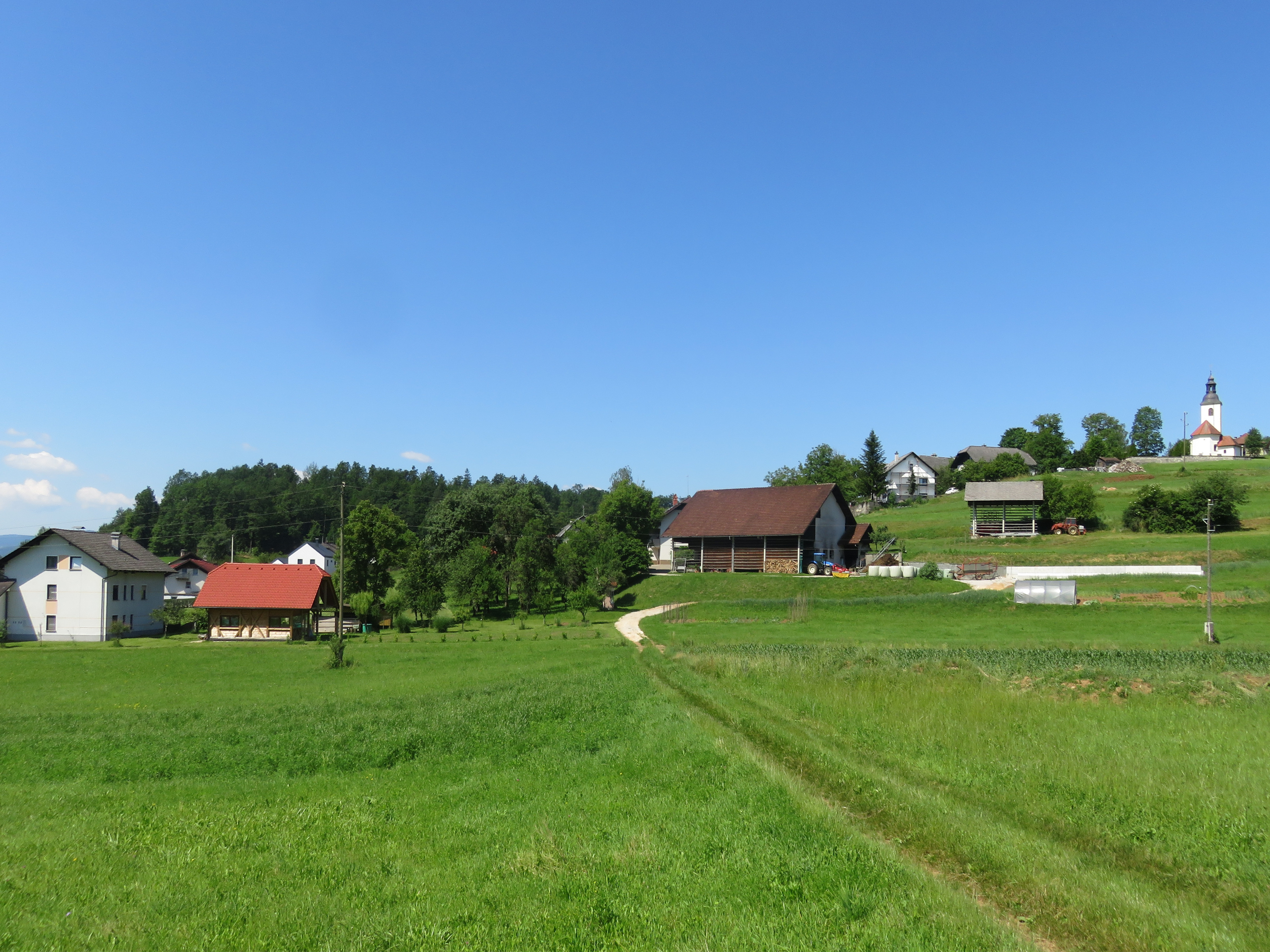

- Location in Slovenia
- Coordinates: 45°58′32.48″N 14°40′20.4″E
- Country: Slovenia
- Traditional region: Lower Carniola
- Statistical region: Central Slovenia
- Municipality: Grosuplje

Area
  - Total: 1.39 km^{2} (0.54 sq mi)
- Elevation: 362.7 m (1,190 ft)

Population (2002)
  - Total: 40

Mala Stara Vas (pronounced [ˈmaːla ˈstaːɾa ˈʋaːs]; Slovene: Mala Stara vas, German: Kleinaltendorf) is a settlement in the Municipality of Grosuplje in central Slovenia. The area is part of the historical region of Lower Carniola. The municipality is now included in the Central Slovenia Statistical Region.

== Church ==
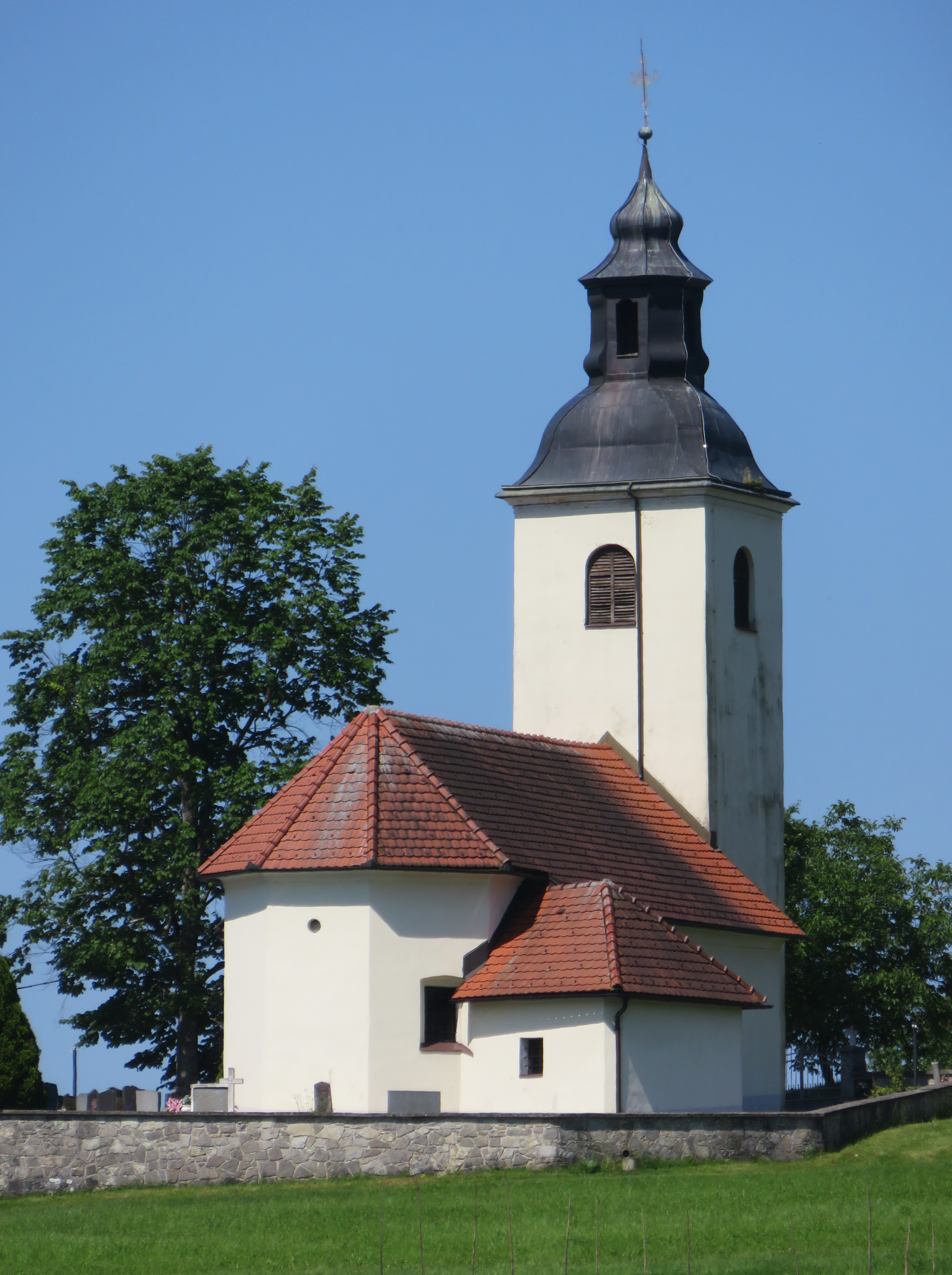
Saint Catherine's Church

The village church is dedicated to Saint Catherine and originally dates to the 12th century with 14th- and 17th-century additions.
