= Perovo, Vyaznikovsky District, Vladimir Oblast =

Perovo Перово
- Village
- Location within Vladimir Oblast Location within Russia
- Coordinates: 56°12′N 42°24′E
- Country: Russia
- Region: Vladimir Oblast
- District: Vyaznikovsky District
- Time zone: UTC+3:00

Perovo (Russian: Перóво) is a rural locality (a village) in Gorod Vyazniki, Vyaznikovsky District, Vladimir Oblast, Russia. The population was 252 as of 2010. There are 2 streets.

== Geography ==
Perovo is located on the right bank of the Klyazma River, 18 km east of Vyazniki (the district's administrative centre) by road. Ilyina Gora is the nearest rural locality.
