= Perovo (Grosuplje) =

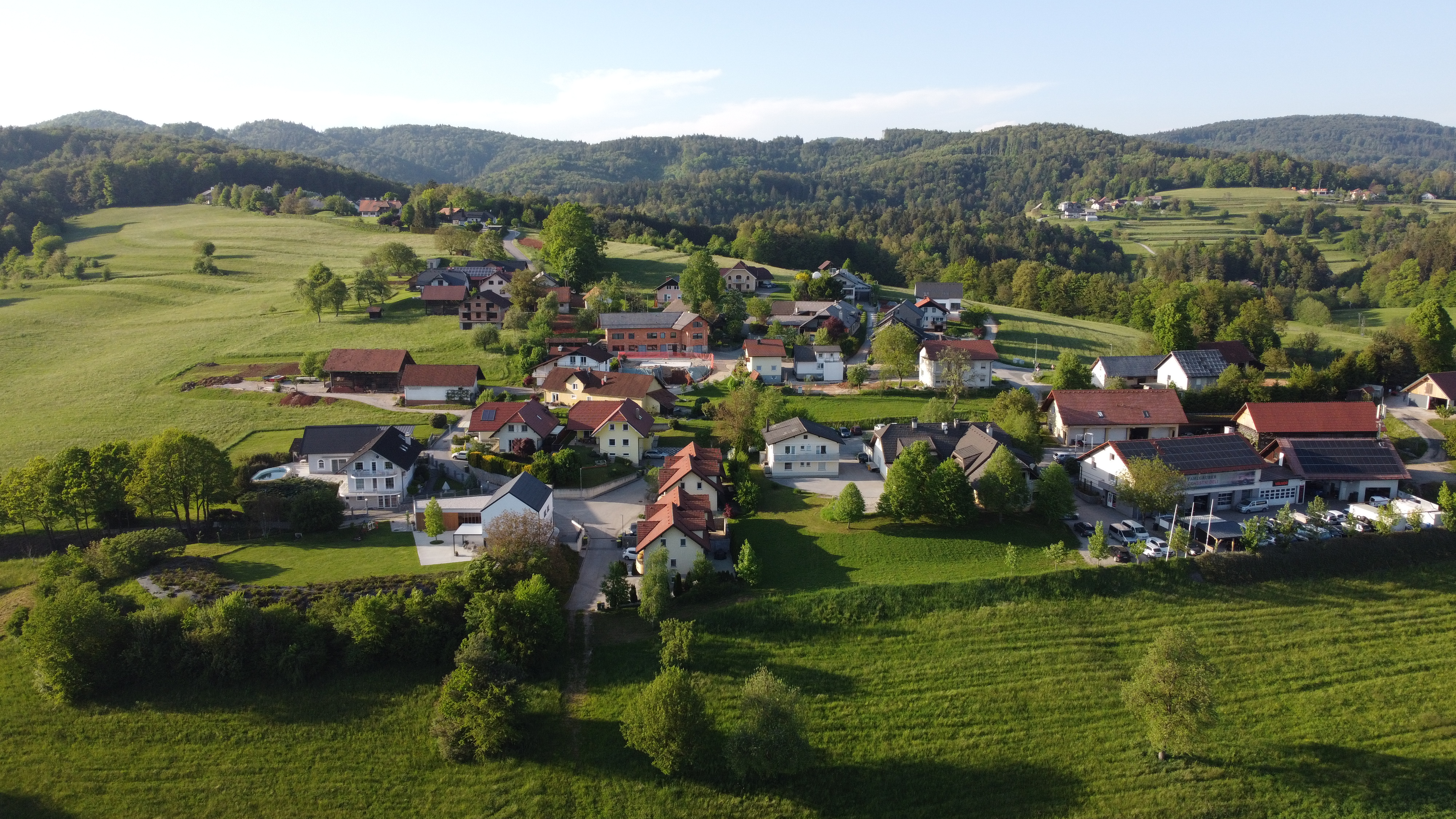

- Location in Slovenia
- Coordinates: 45°58′16.19″N 14°39′35.92″E
- Country: Slovenia
- Traditional region: Lower Carniola
- Statistical region: Central Slovenia
- Municipality: Grosuplje
- Elevation: 350 m (1,150 ft)

Perovo (pronounced [pɛˈɾɔːʋɔ]) is a formerly independent settlement in the northern part of the town of Grosuplje in central Slovenia. It belongs to the Municipality of Grosuplje. It is part of the traditional region of Lower Carniola and is now included with the rest of the municipality in the Central Slovenia Statistical Region. It includes the hamlet of Potok.

== Geography ==
Perovo is a clustered village on a low hill above the freeway between Grosuplje and Polica. Breg Creek (also known as Grosupeljščica Creek) flows below the village and through the swampy Logje Meadow towards Grosuplje. The hamlet of Potok stands above the left bank of the creek. There are meadows and tilled fields on the terraced land, as well as some orchards.

== History ==
Perovo stood along a Roman road and many artifacts have been founds here, including a bronze ax. The economy of the village was traditionally tied to farming, especially raising potatoes and grain. Animal husbandry was also important and milk was sold to Grosuplje and Ljubljana. A water main was installed to Perovo from Black Valley (Slovene: Črna dolina) near Dobje in 1910. The area near the bridge over Breg Creek was formerly used as a public laundry. During the Second World War, the village was burned by Italian forces on 3 January 1942 during an engagement with the Partisans. A monument to the fallen machine gunner Anton Ahlin stands above the village. Perovo was annexed by the town of Grosuplje in 1971, ending its existence as an independent settlement.
