= Peč, Grosuplje =

Peč
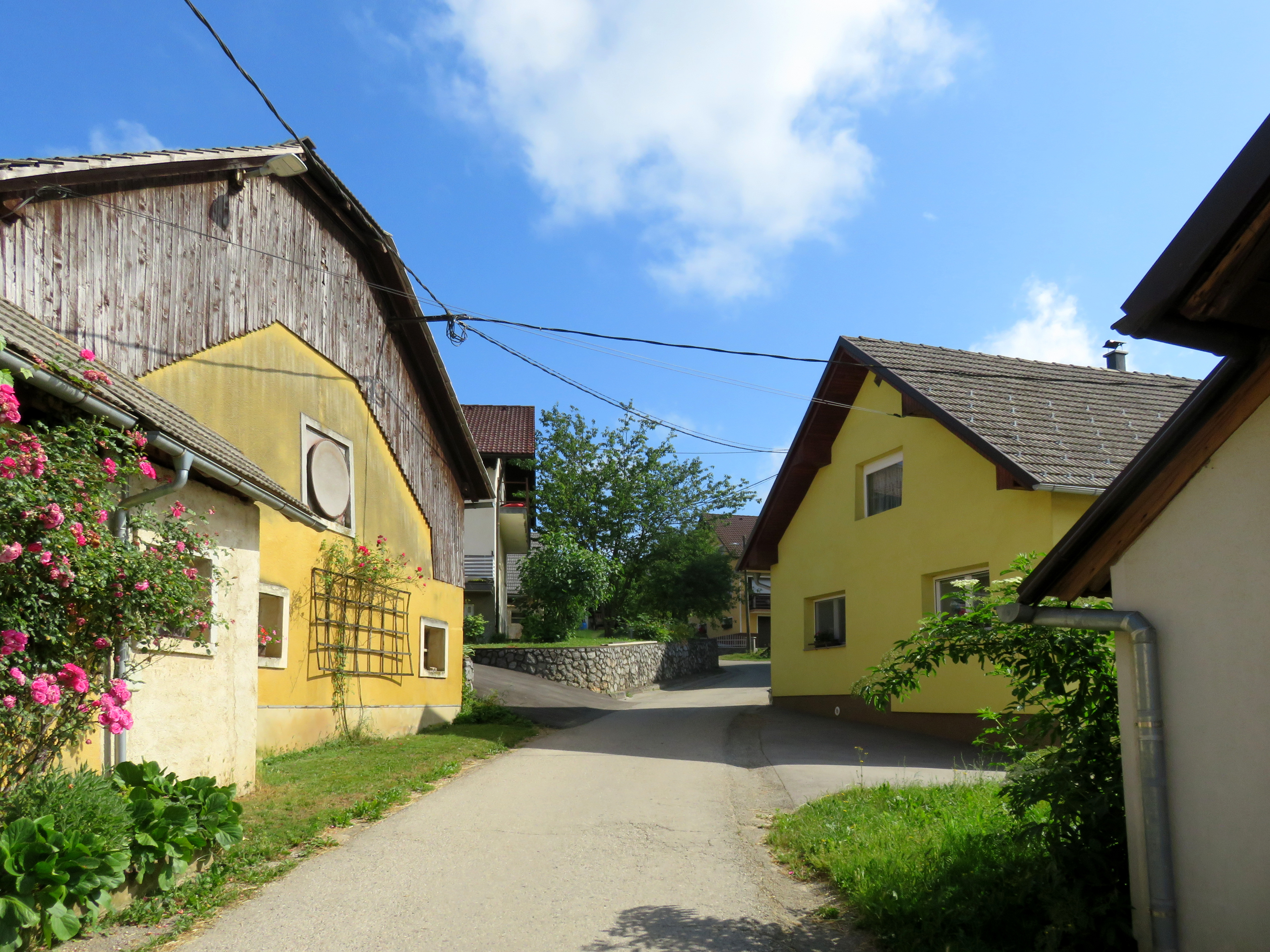

- Location in Slovenia
- Coordinates: 45°58′7.15″N 14°41′57.63″E
- Country: Slovenia
- Traditional region: Lower Carniola
- Statistical region: Central Slovenia
- Municipality: Grosuplje

Area
  - Total: 2.23 km^{2} (0.86 sq mi)
- Elevation: 429.9 m (1,410 ft)

Population (2002)
  - Total: 80

Peč (pronounced [ˈpeːtʃ]) is a small settlement south of Polica in the Municipality of Grosuplje in central Slovenia. The area is part of the historical region of Lower Carniola. The municipality is now included in the Central Slovenia Statistical Region.
