= Lovrenc na Dravskem Polju =

Lovrenc na Dravskem Polju Sveti Lovrenc na Dravskem Polju (until 1952)
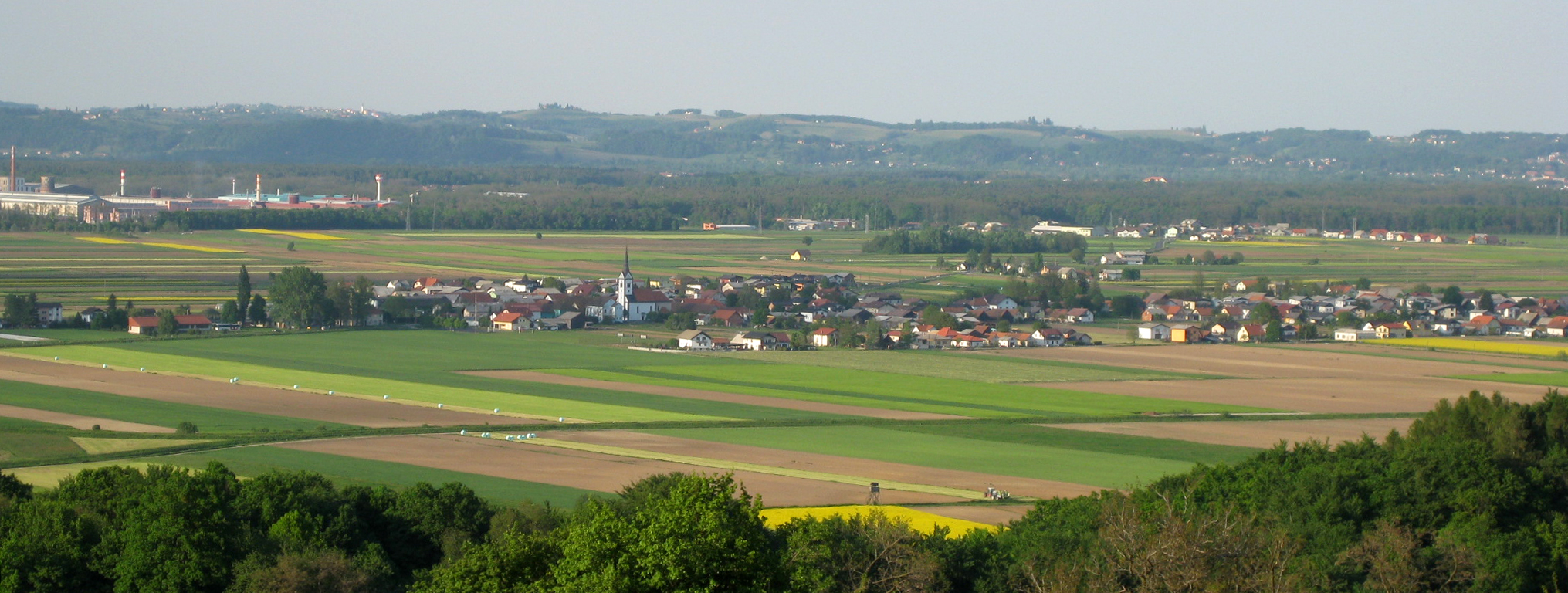

- Location in Slovenia
- Coordinates: 46°22′42.41″N 15°46′47.02″E
- Country: Slovenia
- Traditional region: Styria
- Statistical region: Drava
- Municipality: Kidričevo

Area
  - Total: 2.73 km^{2} (1.05 sq mi)
- Elevation: 236.9 m (777 ft)

Population (2002)
  - Total: 657

Lovrenc na Dravskem Polju (pronounced [ˈlɔ́ːwɾɛnts na ˈdɾàːwskɛm ˈpóːlju]; Slovene: Lovrenc na Dravskem polju) is a village in the Municipality of Kidričevo in northeastern Slovenia. Traditionally the entire area was part of the Styria region. It is now included with the rest of the municipality in the Drava Statistical Region.

== Name ==
The name of the settlement was changed from Sveti Lovrenc na Dravskem polju (literally, 'Saint Lawrence on the Drava Plain') to Lovrenc na Dravskem polju (literally, 'Lawrence on the Drava Plain') in 1952. The name was changed on the basis of the 1948 Law on Names of Settlements and Designations of Squares, Streets, and Buildings as part of efforts by Slovenia's postwar communist government to remove religious elements from toponyms.

== Church ==
The local parish church, from which the settlement gets its name, is dedicated to Saint Lawrence and belongs to the Roman Catholic Archdiocese of Maribor. It was built in 1414 on the site of an earlier church, first mentioned in written documents dating to 1323. Part of a late 12th-century structure is incorporated into the sanctuary.
