= List of cities, towns, and villages in Slovenia: R =

This is a list of cities, towns, and villages in Slovenia, starting with R.

Settlement	Municipality
Rača	Domžale
Rače	Rače-Fram
Račeva	Žiri
Račica	Litija
Račica	Sevnica
Račice	Ilirska Bistrica
Račja vas	Brežice
Račje Selo	Trebnje
Rački Vrh	Radenci
Račni Vrh	Domžale
Radana vas	Zreče
Radanja vas	Ivančna Gorica
Radeče	Radeče
Radegunda	Mozirje
Radehova	Lenart
Radelca	Radlje ob Dravi
Radenci	Radenci
Radenski Vrh	Radenci
Radež	Sevnica
Radgonica	Litija
Radizel	Hoče-Slivnica
Radlek	Bloke
Radlje ob Dravi	Radlje ob Dravi
Radmirje	Ljubno
Radmožanci	Lendava
Radna vas	Trebnje
Radna	Sevnica
Radoblje	Laško
Radohova vas	Ivančna Gorica
Radomerje	Ljutomer
Radomerščak	Ljutomer
Radomlje	Domžale
Radoslavci	Ljutomer
Radoši	Metlika
Radovci	Grad
Radovica	Metlika
Radoviči	Metlika
Radovlja	Novo mesto
Radovljica	Radovljica
Radovna	Bled
Raduha	Luče
Raduše	Slovenj Gradec
Radvenci	Gornja Radgona
Rafolče	Lukovica
Rajec	Brežice
Rajhenav	Kočevje
Rajndol	Kočevje
Rajnkovec	Rogaška Slatina
Rajnovšče	Novo mesto
Rajšele	Kostel
Raka	Krško
Rake	Kostel
Rakek	Cerknica
Rakičan	Murska Sobota
Rakitna	Brezovica
Rakitnica	Ribnica
Rakitnik	Postojna
Rakitovec	Koper
Rakitovec	Šentjur
Rakov Škocjan	Cerknica
Rakova Steza	Vojnik
Rakovci	Ormož
Rakovec	Brežice
Rakovec	Metlika
Rakovec	Šmarje pri Jelšah
Rakovica	Kranj
Rakovlje	Braslovče
Rakovnik pri Birčni Vasi	Novo mesto
Rakovnik pri Šentrupertu	Trebnje
Rakovnik	Medvode
Rakovnik	Šentjernej
Rakulik	Postojna
Ranca	Pesnica
Ranče	Rače-Fram
Rankovci	Tišina (občina)
Rapljevo	Dobrepolje
Raskovec	Oplotnica
Raša	Sežana
Rašica	Ljubljana
Rašica	Velike Lašče
Ratanska vas	Rogaška Slatina
Rateče	Kranjska Gora
Ratečevo Brdo	Ilirska Bistrica
Ratež	Novo mesto
Ratje	Žužemberk
Ratkovci	Moravske Toplice
Ravenska vas	Zagorje ob Savi
Ravnace	Metlika
Ravne na Blokah	Bloke
Ravne na Koroškem	Ravne na Koroškem
Ravne nad Šentrupertom	Trebnje
Ravne pri Cerknem	Cerkno
Ravne pri Mlinšah	Zagorje ob Savi
Ravne pri Šmartnem	Kamnik
Ravne pri Zdolah	Krško
Ravne pri Žireh	Žiri
Ravne v Bohinju	Bohinj
Ravne	Ajdovščina
Ravne	Cerklje na Gorenjskem
Ravne	Cerknica
Ravne	Litija
Ravne	Mirna
Ravne	Šoštanj
Ravne	Železniki
Ravni Dol	Ivančna Gorica
Ravni Dol	Sodražica
Ravni	Krško
Ravnica	Nova Gorica
Ravnica	Radovljica
Ravnik pri Hotedršici	Logatec
Ravnik	Bloke
Ravnik	Trebnje
Ravnje	Sežana
Ravno Brdo	Ljubljana
Ravno	Dobje
Ravno	Krško
Razbor pri Čemšeniku	Zagorje ob Savi
Razbor	Sevnica
Razbor	Šentjur
Razborca	Mislinja
Razbore - del	Trebnje
Razbore-K. O. Ježni Vrh	Litija
Razbore-K. O. Poljane - del	Litija
Razdelj	Vojnik
Razdrto	Postojna
Razdrto	Šentjernej
Razgor pri Žabljeku	Slovenska Bistrica
Razgor	Vojnik
Razgorce	Vojnik
Razguri	Sežana
Razkrižje	Razkrižje
Razori	Dobrova-Polhov Gradec
Razpotje	Zagorje ob Savi
Raztez	Krško
Razvanje	Maribor
Rdeči Breg - del	Lovrenc na Pohorju
Rdeči Breg - del	Podvelka
Rdeči Kal	Ivančna Gorica
Rdeči Kal	Trebnje
Reber pri Škofljici	Škofljica
Reber	Žužemberk
Recenjak	Lovrenc na Pohorju
Rečica ob Paki	Šmartno ob Paki
Rečica ob Savinji	Mozirje
Rečica	Ilirska Bistrica
Reka	Cerkno
Reka	Laško
Remšnik	Radlje ob Dravi
Renče	Nova Gorica
Renke	Litija
Renkovci	Turnišče
Renški Podkraj	Nova Gorica
Rep	Slovenska Bistrica
Reparje	Cerknica
Repče	Ljubljana
Repče	Trebnje
Repišče	Videm
Replje	Trebnje
Repnje	Vodice
Repno	Šentjur
Repuš	Dobje
Resnik	Zreče
Reštanj	Krško
Reteče	Škofja Loka
Retje	Loški Potok
Retnje	Tržič
Reva	Trebnje
Ribče	Litija
Ribčev Laz	Bohinj
Ribjek	Osilnica
Ribjek	Trebnje
Ribnica na Pohorju	Ribnica na Pohorju
Ribnica	Brežice
Ribnica	Pivka
Ribnica	Ribnica
Ribniško Selo	Maribor
Ribno	Bled
Rifengozd	Laško
Rifnik	Šentjur
Rigelj pri Ortneku	Ribnica
Rigonce	Brežice
Riharjevec	Litija
Rihpovec	Trebnje
Rihtarovci	Radenci
Rimske Toplice	Laško
Rinčetova Graba	Ljutomer
Ritmerk	Ormož
Ritomeče	Hrpelje-Kozina
Ritoznoj	Slovenska Bistrica
Rižana	Koper
Rjavci	Sveti Andraž v Slovenskih goricah
Rjavče	Ilirska Bistrica
Rjavica	Rogaška Slatina
Rob	Velike Lašče
Robanov Kot	Solčava
Robič	Kobarid
Robidišče	Kobarid
Robidnica	Gorenja vas-Poljane
Roče	Tolmin
Ročevnica	Tržič
Ročica	Pesnica
Ročinj	Kanal
Rodež	Zagorje ob Savi
Rodica	Domžale
Rodik	Hrpelje-Kozina
Rodine pri Trebnjem	Trebnje
Rodine	Črnomelj
Rodine	Žirovnica
Rodmošci	Gornja Radgona
Rodni Vrh	Podlehnik
Rogačice	Sevnica
Rogaška Slatina	Rogaška Slatina
Rogašovci	Rogašovci
Rogatec nad Želimljami	Ig
Rogatec	Rogatec
Rogati Hrib	Kočevje
Roginska Gorca	Podčetrtek
Rogla	Zreče
Rogoza	Hoče-Slivnica
Rogoznica	Lenart
Roje pri Čatežu	Trebnje
Roje pri Trebelnem	Trebnje
Roje	Šentjernej
Ropoča	Rogašovci
Rosalnice	Metlika
Rošnja	Starše
Rošpoh - del	Kungota
Rošpoh - del	Maribor
Rotman	Juršinci
Rova	Domžale
Rove	Vojnik
Rove	Zagorje ob Savi
Rovišče pri Studencu	Sevnica
Rovišče	Zagorje ob Savi
Rovt pod Menino	Nazarje
Rovt	Dobrova-Polhov Gradec
Rovtarske Žibrše	Logatec
Rovte v Selški Dolini	Škofja Loka
Rovte	Logatec
Rovte	Radovljica
Rožanče	Bloke
Rožanec	Črnomelj
Rožar	Koper
Roženberk	Trebnje
Rožengrunt	Sveta Ana (občina)
Roženpelj	Trebnje
Rožice	Hrpelje-Kozina
Rožič Vrh	Črnomelj
Rožički Vrh	Sveti Jurij ob Ščavnici
Rožično	Kamnik
Rožna Dolina	Nova Gorica
Rožni Dol	Semič
Rožni Vrh	Celje
Rožni Vrh	Trebnje
Rožnik	Grosuplje
Rožno	Krško
Rtiče	Zagorje ob Savi
Rubije	Komen
Rucmanci	Ormož
Ručetna vas	Črnomelj
Rudna vas	Radeče
Rudnica	Podčetrtek
Rudnik pri Moravčah	Moravče
Rudnik pri Radomljah	Kamnik
Rudno	Železniki
Rudolfovo	Cerknica
Ruhna vas	Škocjan
Rumanja vas	Novo mesto
Runarsko	Bloke
Runeč	Ormož
Runtole	Celje
Rupe	Celje
Rupe	Velike Lašče
Ruperče	Maribor
Ruše	Ruše
Ruše	Žalec
Rut	Tolmin
Ruta	Lovrenc na Pohorju
Ržišče	Krško
Ržišče	Litija
Ržiše	Zagorje ob Savi
