= Bregant =

Bregant is the family name of following persons:

- Camillo Bregant (1879–1956), Austrian Major General
- Eugen Bregant (1875-1936), Austrian Major General and Colonel
- Tatjana Bregant (1932–2002), a Slovenian archaeologist and prehistorian
