= Žilče =

Žilče may refer to:

- Žilče, Jegunovce, North Macedonia
- Sveti Vid, Cerknica, Slovenia
