= Čohovo =

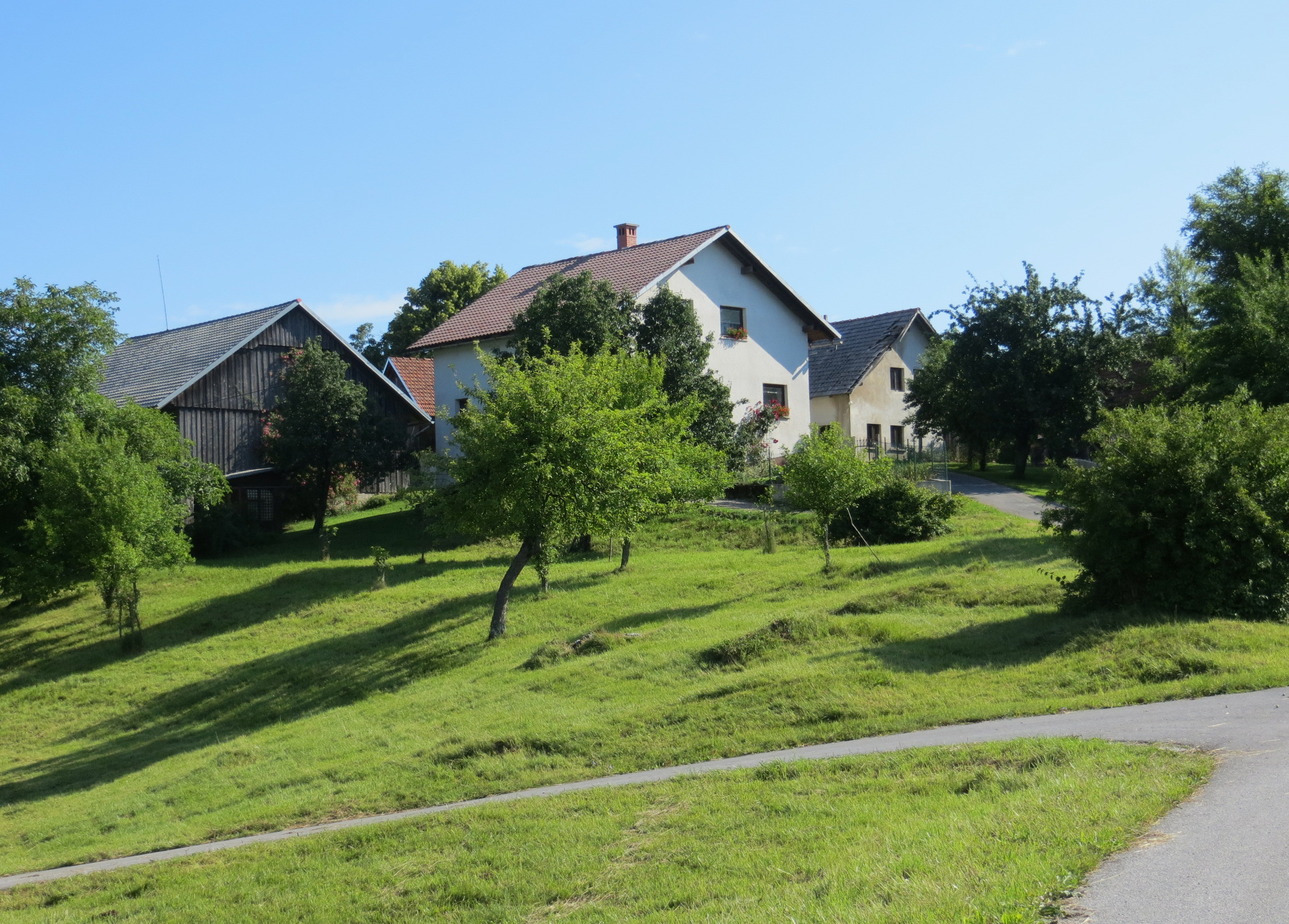

- Location in Slovenia
- Coordinates: 45°51′14.33″N 14°27′50.17″E
- Country: Slovenia
- Traditional region: Inner Carniola
- Statistical region: Littoral–Inner Carniola
- Municipality: Cerknica

Area
  - Total: 0.75 km^{2} (0.29 sq mi)
- Elevation: 850.1 m (2,789 ft)

Population (2024)
  - Total: 5
  - Density: 6.7/km^{2} (17/sq mi)

Čohovo (pronounced [ˈtʃoːxɔʋɔ] or [tʃɔˈxɔːʋɔ] or [-ˈxoː-]) is a small settlement above Sveti Vid in the Municipality of Cerknica in the Inner Carniola region of Slovenia.

== Geography ==
Čohovo is a clustered village on the southwest slope of Čoh Hill (Čohov grič, 870 meters or 2,850 feet), which is covered in needleleaf forest. It stands along the road from Osredek to Ravne. Beden Spring lies below the village toward the Iška River and was used in the past for as a water source for the village. Štembuh Spring, located near the wayside shrine in Čohovo, was outfitted with a trough for watering animals.
