= Recenjak =

- Location in Slovenia
- Coordinates: 46°32′18.39″N 15°21′48.63″E
- Country: Slovenia
- Traditional region: Styria
- Statistical region: Drava
- Municipality: Lovrenc na Pohorju

Area
  - Total: 14.95 km^{2} (5.77 sq mi)
- Elevation: 471.4 m (1,547 ft)

Population (2002)
  - Total: 193

Recenjak (pronounced [ɾɛtsɛˈnjaːk], German: Krätzenbach) is a dispersed settlement in the Pohorje Hills in the Municipality of Lovrenc na Pohorju in northeastern Slovenia. The area is part of the traditional region of Styria. It is now included in the Drava Statistical Region.
