= Blatna Brezovica =

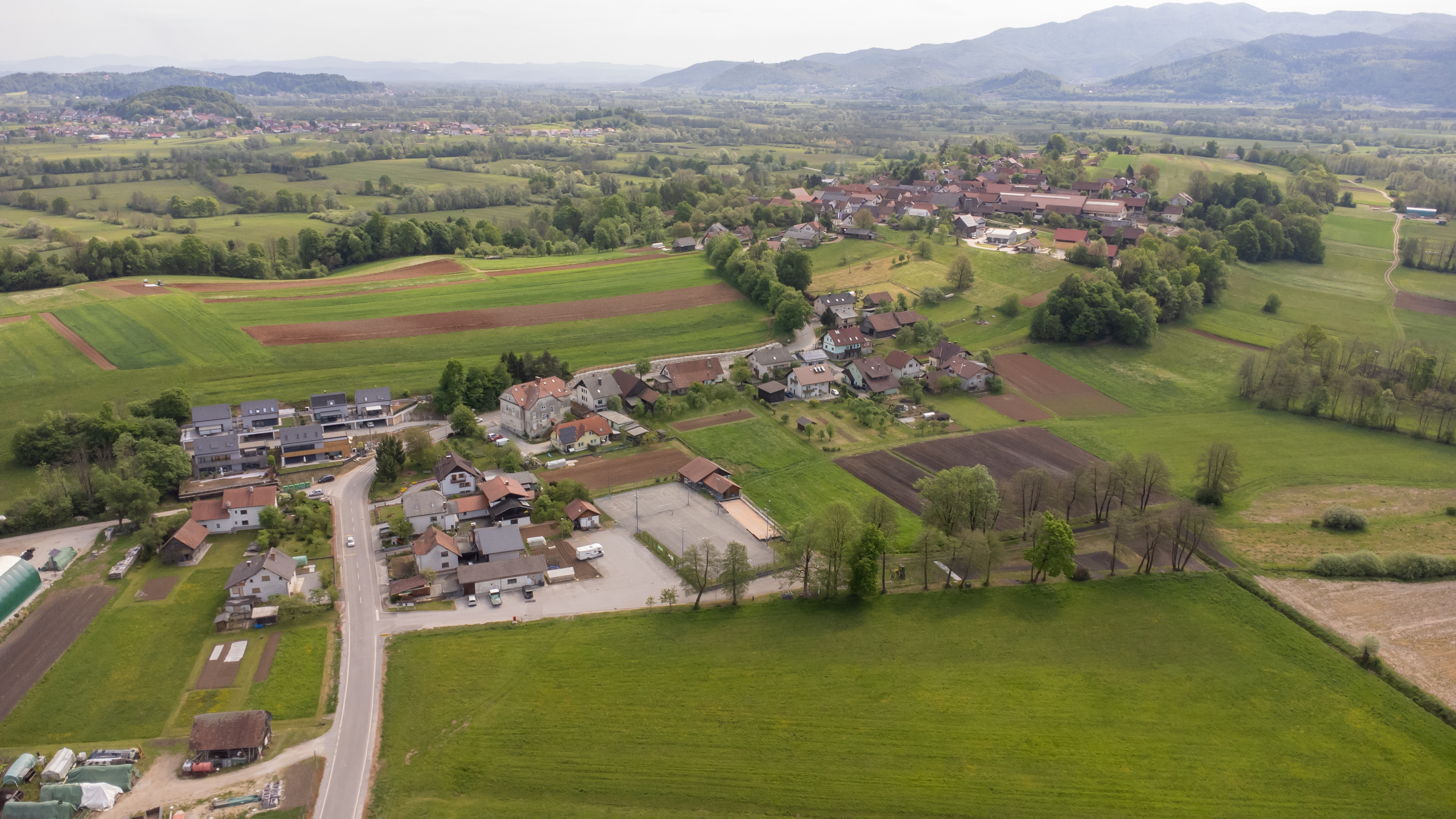

- Location in Slovenia
- Coordinates: 45°58′18.25″N 14°20′21.94″E
- Country: Slovenia
- Traditional region: Inner Carniola
- Statistical region: Central Slovenia
- Municipality: Vrhnika

Area
  - Total: 5.64 km^{2} (2.18 sq mi)
- Elevation: 325.3 m (1,067 ft)

Population (2002)
  - Total: 328

Blatna Brezovica (pronounced [ˈblàːtna ˈbɾéːzɔʋitsa]; German: Blatnabresouza) is a village east of Vrhnika in the Inner Carniola region of Slovenia.

== Name ==
Blatna Brezovica was attested in written sources as Bresawitz and Wresawitz in 1496. Archaeological investigations were led here by Tatjana Bregant.

== Church ==
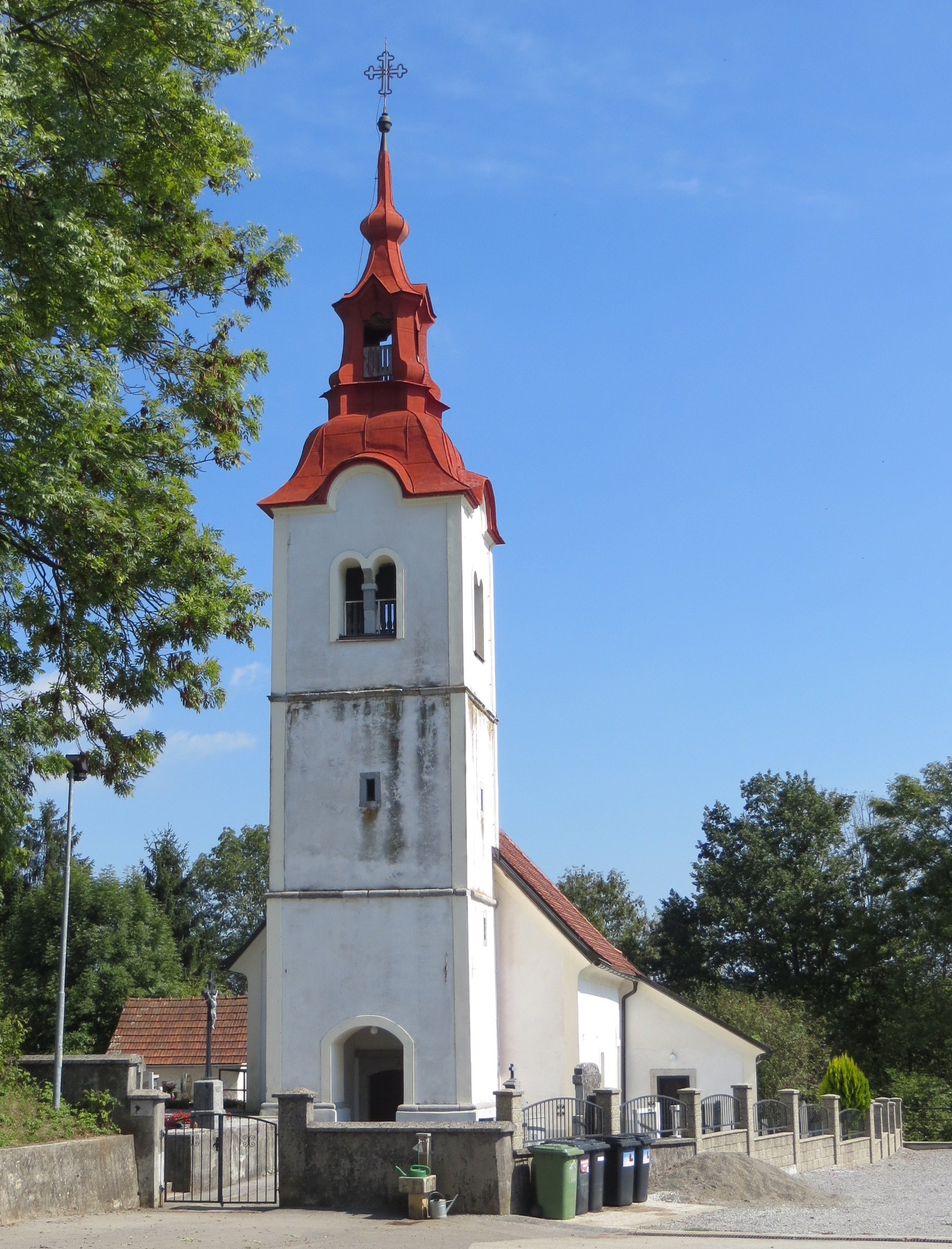
Saint James' Church

The local church south of the settlement is dedicated to Saint James and belongs to the Parish of Vrhnika.
