= Eugen Bregant =

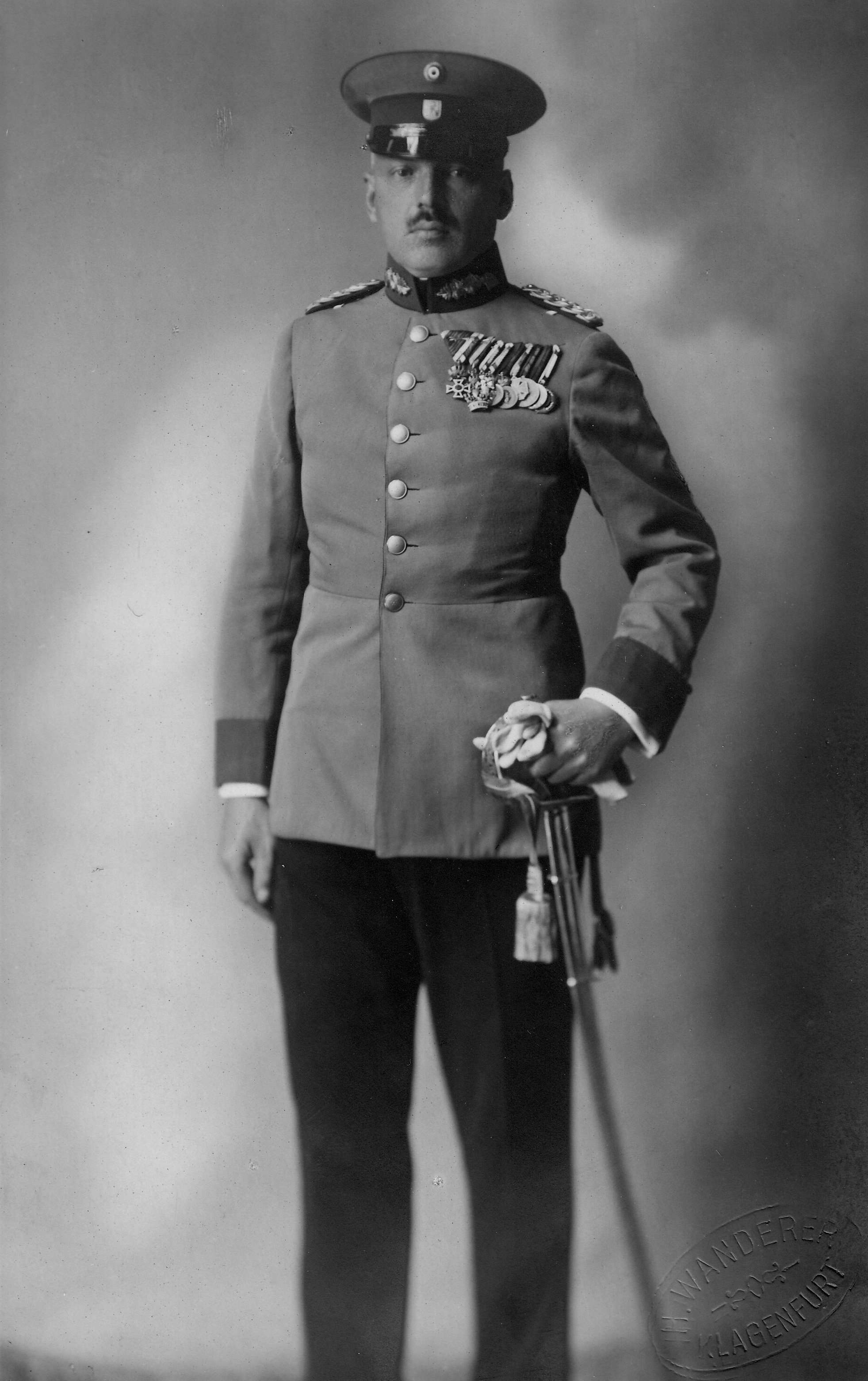
- Major General Eugen Bregant 1927
- Born: 29 January 1875; Triest
- Died: 28 November 1936 (aged 61); Graz, Austria-Hungary (modern Austria)
- Military career
- Allegiance: Austrian Empire; Austria-Hungary (to 1918); First Austrian Republic (to 1928)
- Service years: 1893–1928
- Rank: Generalmajor
- Unit: Infantry (Austria-Hungary)
- Conflicts: First World War: Italian Campaign
- Awards: Military Merit Cross, Order of the Iron Crown, Order of Leopold

Eugen Bregant (29 January 1875 in Trieste, coastal land – 18 November 1936 in Graz, Styria) was major general, colonel of the infantry (alpini) regiment No.1 and an officer of the Austrian Armed Forces in the First Republic of Austria. His younger brother was the last Inspector of Cavalry of the Austrian army Camillo Bregant.

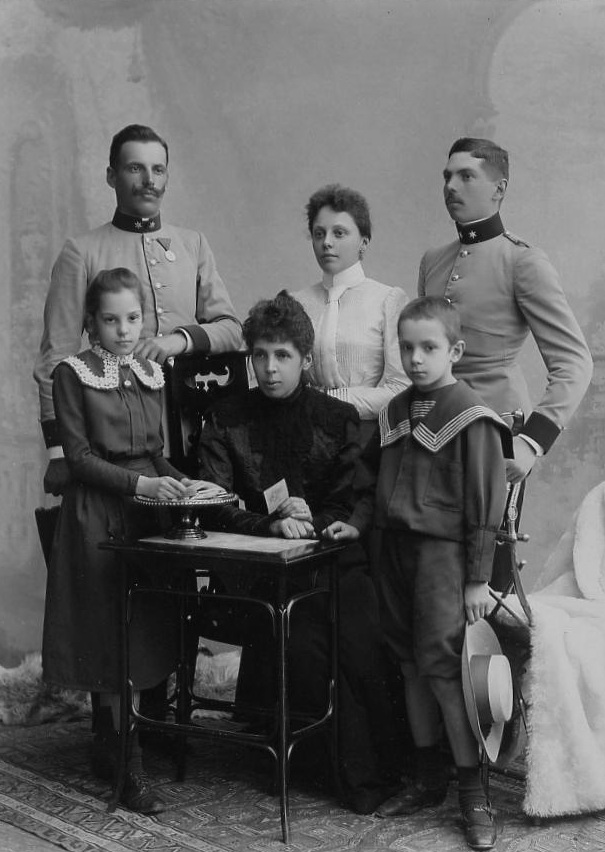
Eugen Bregant with his family (left side)

== Life ==
Eugen Bregant appeared as one-year volunteer on 1 October 1893 in the Imperial Army at the Infantry Regiment No.97 in Trieste, and became assigned to the K.u.k. Landwehr Infantry Regiment "Klagenfurt" No. 4 (it belonged to the K.u.k.Gebirgsjäger and was called Mountain Rifle Regiment No. 1 from 11 April 1917). Because of a never completed study of law at the University of Graz, he interrupted his military service from 1894 to 1897 and 1901.

== Military special education ==
- Mounted infantry course in Trieste
- Light artillery und machine gun course in Bruck an der Leitha
- Corps Officers School in Graz (1910)
- Assault course in Villach (1917)
- Army gas course in Vienna (1917 und 1918)
- Information and Counter-espionage course in Brixen (1918)

== Service and decorations ==
In World War I the battlefields of the K.u.k. Rifle Regiment No. 1 were in 1914 in Galicia in the first Battle of Lemberg, from 1915 until the war ended at the Battles of the Isonzo in the sector Carnic Alps from Tarvis to Predil Pass. Bregant Eugen 1915 was involved in several combat missions, including the Oregone pass, the storming of Monte Peralba and the Hohen Trieb. From 1916 until the war's end, he was commander of a machine-gun battalion (LIB No. 157), 1917 section commander of the height position Zollner, participating in several Battles of the Isonzo and then being used at various focal points of the front of Piave to Stelvio. On 4 November 1918 Bregant with the whole LIB No. 157 went along in Italian POWs Community as a result of a 36 hours too early announced armistice in Ponte di Ark in South Tyrol by the Austrian Army High Command (AOK), from which he was released on 4 August 1919.

Highly decorated with the Knight Cross of the Order of Leopold and the Order of the Iron Crown of the Empire of Austria III. Class with wardecoration and swords, the Military Merit Cross III. Class. and a twice awarded Bronze Military Merit Medal at the red band all with war decoration and swords, various other awards as well as the Karl Troop Cross Bregant returned home from the war. The request for the award of the Military Order of Maria Theresa for the storming of the Monte Per Alba was not done because end of the war.

Becoming major as No.11 in the rankings on 1 May 1918, he was adopted by the Austrian Army after 23 years of service in the imperial Army. From 1 May 1921 after he was promoted to lieutenant colonel, he was assigned as an officer to a wheeled battalion. From March 1922 officer for special use, he was assigned in 1923 to the Alpini Regiment No. 11 and 10. Promoted in August 1926 commander of the Alpini regiment No.1, he was appointed to major general in March 1927 and retired in 1928 because of his war injuries.

== Wounds ==
- upper arm bullet with nerve injury (1914)
- stone chips injury to his right forearm (1916)

== Literature ==
- Hubert Fankhauser: Freiwillige an Kärntens Grenzen. Die Regimentsgeschichte der K. K. Kärntner freiwilligen Schützen 1915 bis 1918. Vehling Verlag, ISBN 978-3-85333-150-7.
- Österreichisches Staatsarchiv/Kriegsarchiv. Wien.
- Heinz von Lichem: Spielhahnstoß und Edelweiß. Leopold Stocker Verlag, Graz 1977.
- Heinz von Lichem: Der Tiroler Hochgebirgskrieg 1915–1918. Steiger Verlag, Berwang (Tirol) 1985.
- Michael Wachtler und Günther Obwegs: Krieg in den Bergen – Dolomiten. Athesia Bozen 2003.
- von Lempruch: Ortlerkämpfe 1915–1918. Buchdienst Südtirol 2005.
- Herman Hinterstoisser, M. Christian Ortner, Erwin A. Schmidl Die k.k. Landwehr-Gebirgstruppen. Wien 2006, ISBN 3-902526-02-5.
