= Municipality of Lovrenc na Pohorju =

Municipality of Slovenia

Municipality of Lovrenc na Pohorju Občina Lovrenc na Pohorju
- Municipality
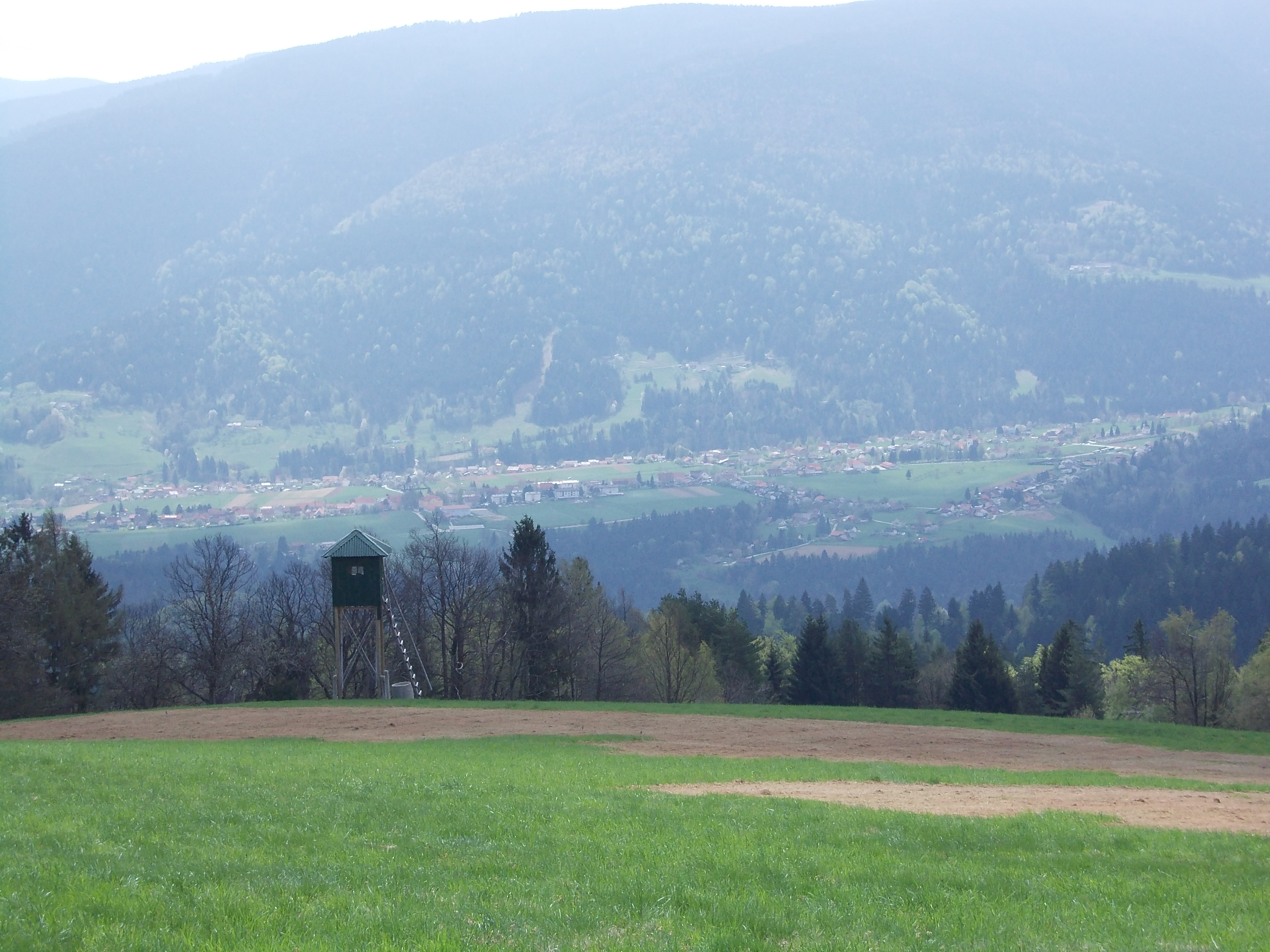

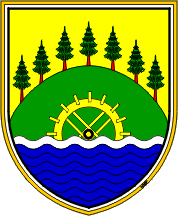
- Flag Coat of arms

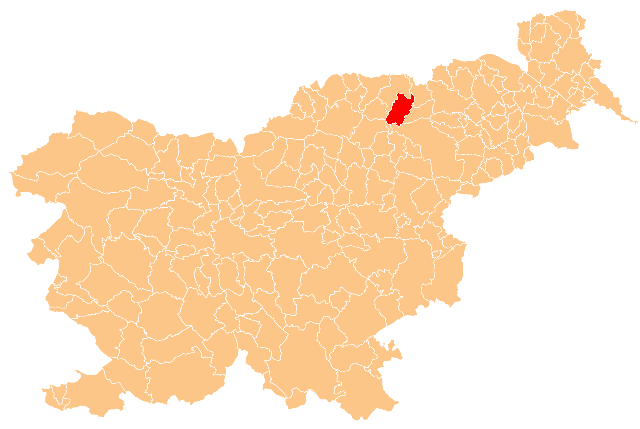
- Location of the Municipality of Lovrenc na Pohorju in Slovenia
- Coordinates: 46°32′17″N 15°23′3″E
- Country: Slovenia

Government
  - Mayor: Joško Manfreda (Independent)

Area
  - Total: 84.4 km^{2} (32.6 sq mi)

Population (2013)
  - Total: 3,096
  - Density: 36.7/km^{2} (95.0/sq mi)
- Time zone: UTC+01 (CET)
  - Summer (DST): UTC+02 (CEST)
- Website: www.lovrenc.si

The Municipality of Lovrenc na Pohorju is a municipality in northeastern Slovenia. It lies in the Pohorje Hills to the west of Maribor. The area is part of the traditional region of Styria. It is now included in the Drava Statistical Region. The settlement of Lovrenc na Pohorju is the seat of the municipality.

== Settlements ==
In addition to the municipal seat of Lovrenc na Pohorju, the municipality also includes the following settlements:

- Činžat
- Kumen
- Puščava
- Rdeči Breg
- Recenjak
- Ruta
