= Kumen =

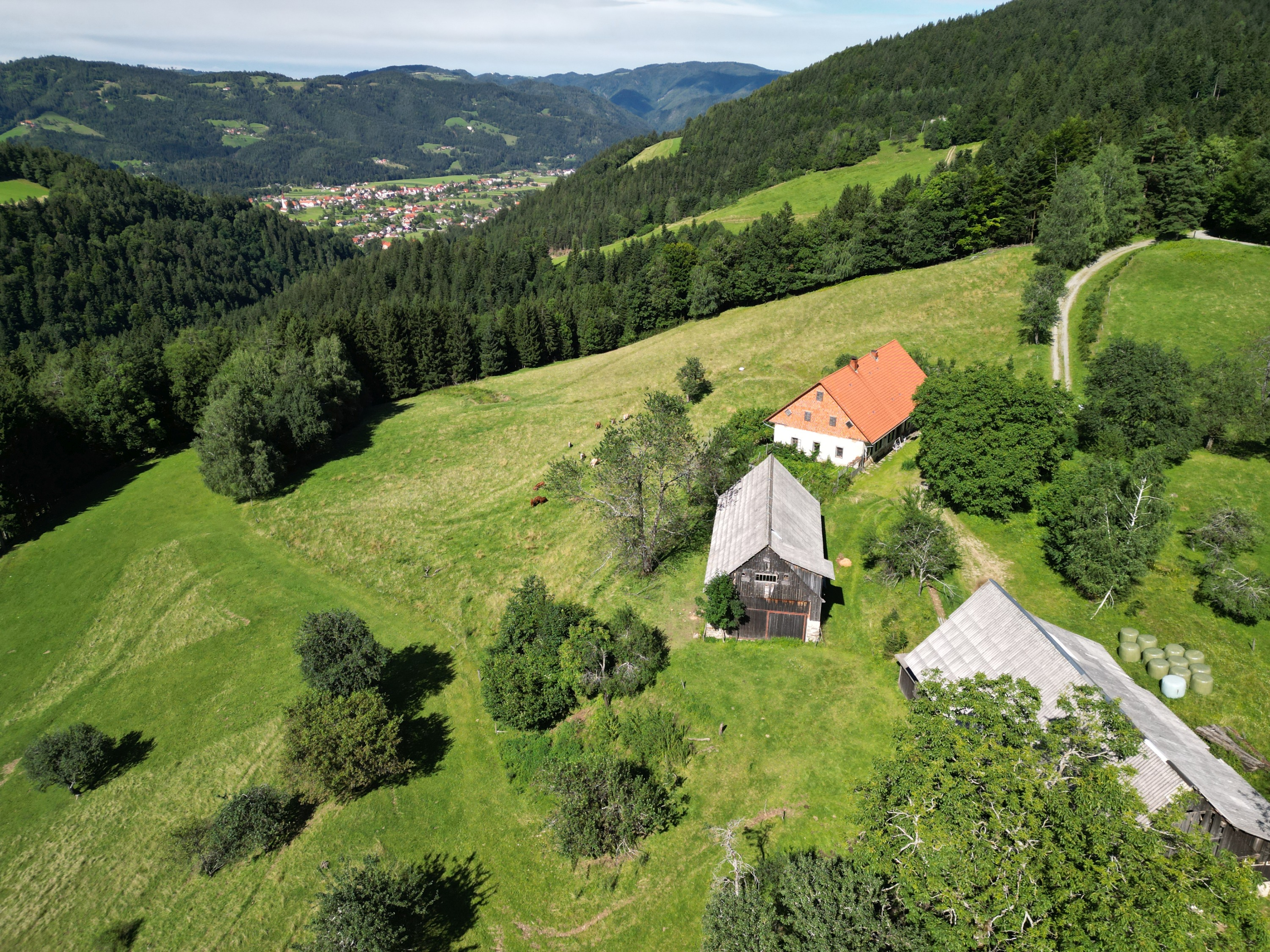

- Location in Slovenia
- Coordinates: 46°32′9.83″N 15°24′7.02″E
- Country: Slovenia
- Traditional region: Styria
- Statistical region: Drava
- Municipality: Lovrenc na Pohorju

Area
  - Total: 41.03 km^{2} (15.84 sq mi)
- Elevation: 493.2 m (1,618 ft)

Population (2002)
  - Total: 367

Kumen (pronounced [ˈkuːmən]) is a dispersed settlement in the Pohorje Hills in the Municipality of Lovrenc na Pohorju in northeastern Slovenia. The area is part of the traditional region of Styria. It is now included in the Drava Statistical Region.

A chapel with a belfry in the northeastern part of the settlement is dedicated to Saint Anne and was built in 1659.
