= Puščava, Lovrenc na Pohorju =

Puščava
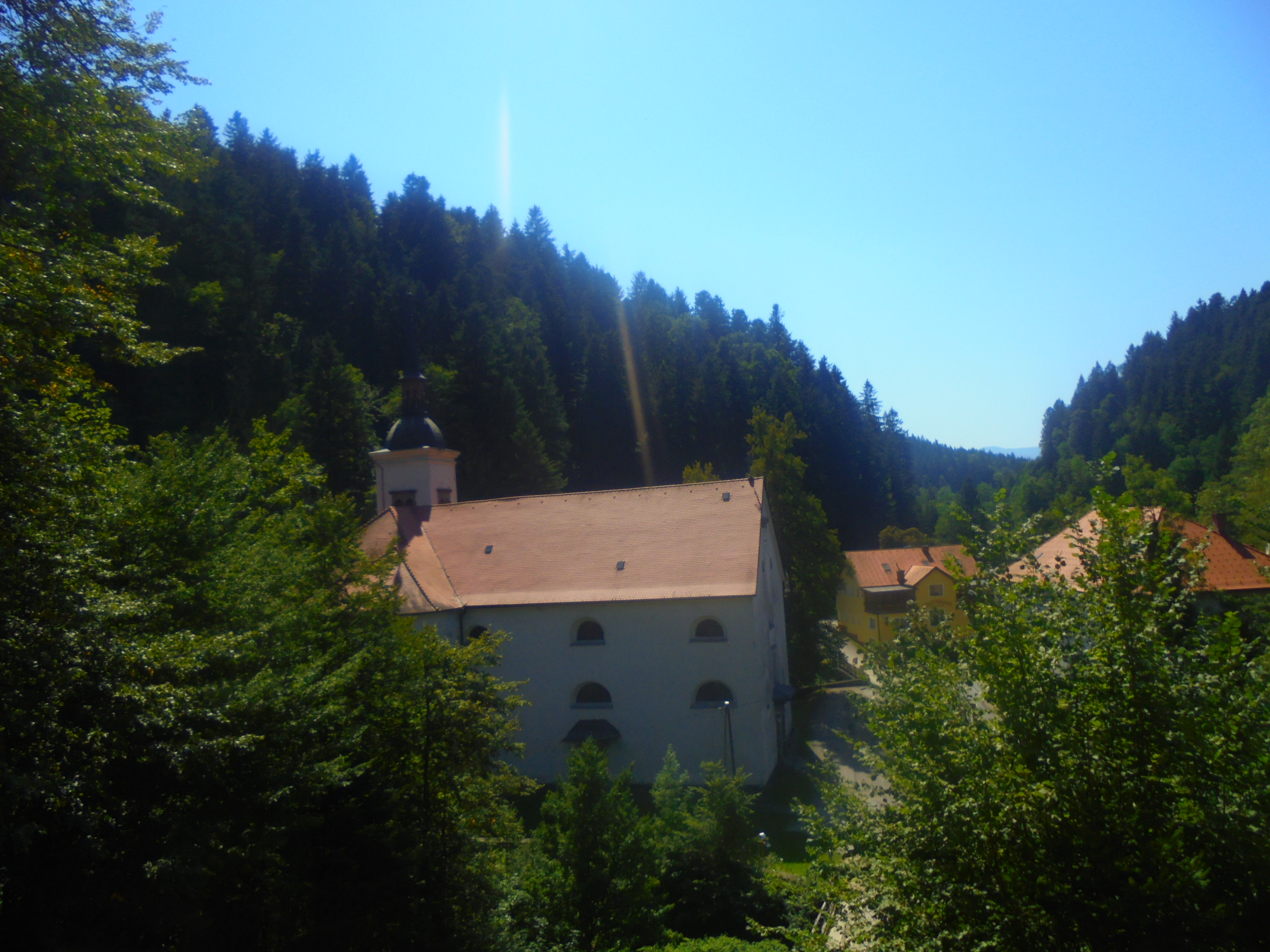

- Location in Slovenia
- Coordinates: 46°33′11.59″N 15°24′34.24″E
- Country: Slovenia
- Traditional region: Styria
- Statistical region: Drava
- Municipality: Lovrenc na Pohorju

Area
  - Total: 4.7 km^{2} (1.8 sq mi)
- Elevation: 399.3 m (1,310 ft)

Population (2002)
  - Total: 70

Puščava (pronounced [puˈʃtʃaːʋa]) is a dispersed settlement in the Municipality of Lovrenc na Pohorju in northeastern Slovenia. It extends from the right bank of the Drava River in the Pohorje Hills. The area is part of the traditional region of Styria. It is now included in the Drava Statistical Region.

The local parish church is dedicated to Mary Help of Christians (Slovene: Marija Pomočnica) and belongs to the Roman Catholic Archdiocese of Maribor. It is a pilgrimage church built between 1668 and 1672 on the site of an earlier chapel of which only part of the belfry survives.
