= Ravni, Krško =

Ravni
- Location in Slovenia
- Coordinates: 45°56′44.31″N 15°24′23.09″E
- Country: Slovenia
- Traditional region: Lower Carniola
- Statistical region: Lower Sava
- Municipality: Krško

Area
  - Total: 1.94 km^{2} (0.75 sq mi)
- Elevation: 303.3 m (995 ft)

Population (2002)
  - Total: 53
- Postal code: 8270

Ravni (pronounced [ɾau̯ˈniː]; in older sources also Ravno, German: Rauno) is a village in the Municipality of Krško in eastern Slovenia. The area is part of the traditional region of Lower Carniola. It is now included with the rest of the municipality in the Lower Sava Statistical Region.

The local church is dedicated to Saint Vitus and belongs to the Parish of Sveti Duh–Veliki Trn. Its medieval nave was extended in the late 18th century.
