= Rdeči Breg, Lovrenc na Pohorju =

Rdeči Breg
- Location in Slovenia
- Coordinates: 46°33′6.85″N 15°22′35.95″E
- Country: Slovenia
- Traditional region: Styria
- Statistical region: Drava
- Municipality: Lovrenc na Pohorju

Area
  - Total: 11.49 km^{2} (4.44 sq mi)
- Elevation: 555 m (1,821 ft)

Population (2002)
  - Total: 248

Rdeči Breg (pronounced [əɾˈdeːtʃi ˈbɾeːk], in older sources Rudeči Breg, German: Rottenberg) is a dispersed settlement in the Municipality of Lovrenc na Pohorju in northeastern Slovenia. It extends from the right bank of the Drava River in the Pohorje Hills and part of the settlement lies in the adjacent Municipality of Podvelka. The area is part of the traditional region of Styria. It is now included in the Drava Statistical Region.
