= Ravno, Krško =

Ravno
- Location in Slovenia
- Coordinates: 45°53′50.11″N 15°22′27.68″E
- Country: Slovenia
- Traditional region: Lower Carniola
- Statistical region: Lower Sava
- Municipality: Krško

Area
  - Total: 1.1 km^{2} (0.42 sq mi)
- Elevation: 159.5 m (523 ft)

Population (2002)
  - Total: 80

Ravno (pronounced [ˈɾaːu̯nɔ]; German: Rauno) is a settlement in the Municipality of Krško in eastern Slovenia. The area is part of the traditional region of Lower Carniola. It is now included in the Lower Sava Statistical Region.

The local church, built on a small hill in the northern part of the settlement known as Gornje Ravno, is dedicated to Saint Leonard and belongs to the Parish of Raka. It is a Baroque building dating to the 17th century.
