= Reva, Trebnje =

Reva
- Location in Slovenia
- Coordinates: 45°52′9.97″N 14°58′49.48″E
- Country: Slovenia
- Traditional region: Lower Carniola
- Statistical region: Southeast Slovenia
- Municipality: Trebnje

Area
  - Total: 0.31 km^{2} (0.12 sq mi)
- Elevation: 247 m (810 ft)

Population (2002)
  - Total: 18

Reva (pronounced [ˈɾeːʋa]) is a small settlement just south of Dobrnič in the Municipality of Trebnje in eastern Slovenia. The area is part of the historical region of Lower Carniola. The municipality is now included in the Southeast Slovenia Statistical Region.
