= Žilče, Jegunovce =

Žilče Жилче
- Village
- Location within North Macedonia
- Coordinates: 42.031516°N 21.060544°E
- Country: North Macedonia
- Region: Polog
- Municipality: Jegunovce

Population (2002)
  - Total: 650
- Time zone: UTC+1 (CET)
  - Summer (DST): UTC+2 (CEST)
- Car plates: TE

Žilče (Macedonian: Жилче) is a village that is located in the municipality of Jegunovce, in North Macedonia.

== Demographics ==
Žilče is attested in the 1467/68 Ottoman tax registry (defter) for the Nahiyah of Kalkandelen. The village had a total of 14 Christian households.

According to the 2002 census, the village had a total of 650 inhabitants. Ethnic groups in the village include:

- Macedonians 642
- Serbs 5
- Others 3
