= Ravne, Litija =

Ravne
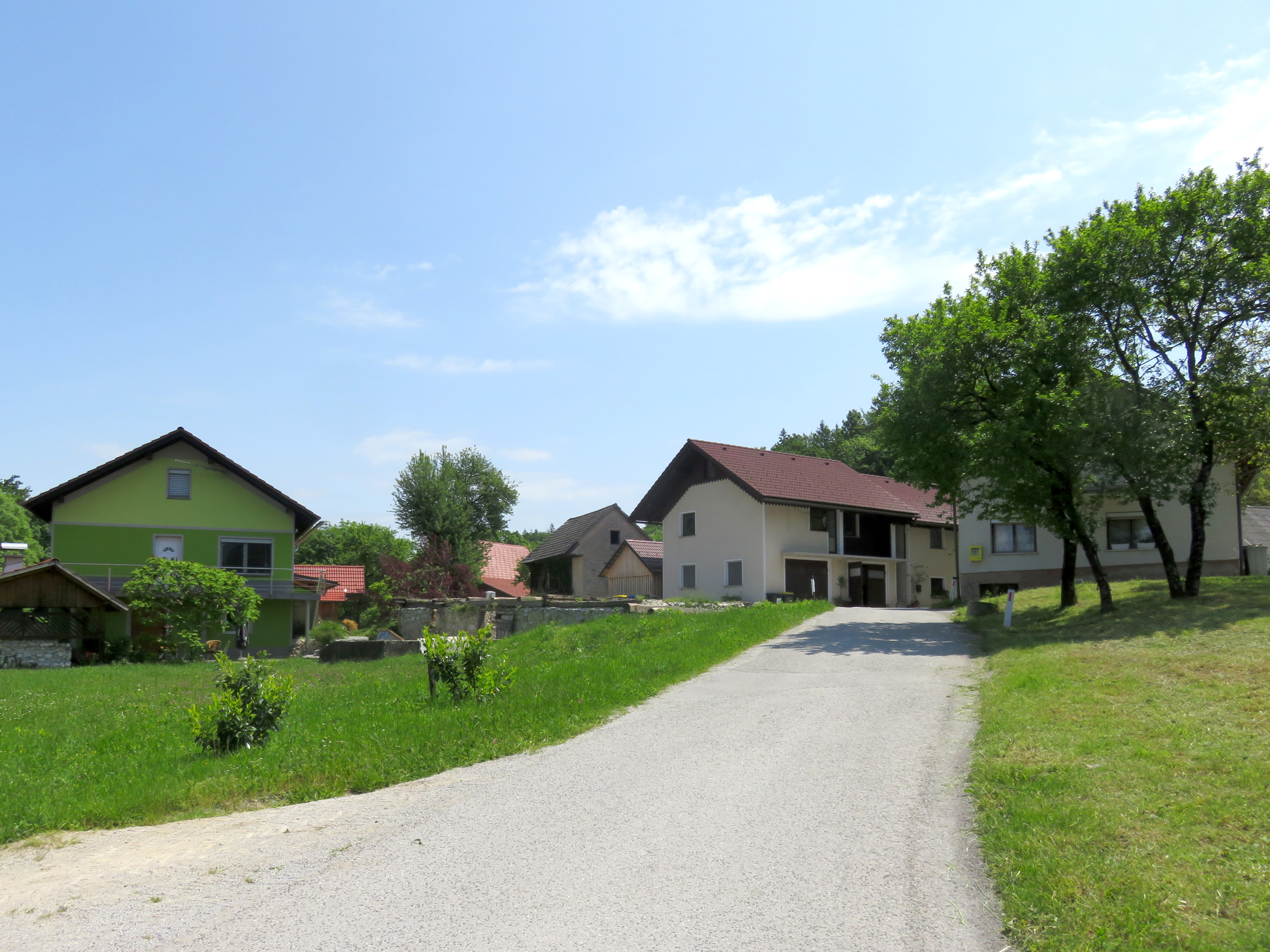

- Location in Slovenia
- Coordinates: 46°5′18.38″N 14°57′53.83″E
- Country: Slovenia
- Traditional region: Lower Carniola
- Statistical region: Central Sava
- Municipality: Litija

Area
  - Total: 1.82 km^{2} (0.70 sq mi)
- Elevation: 611.6 m (2,007 ft)

Population (2002)
  - Total: 36
- Postal code: 1272

Ravne (pronounced [ˈɾáːu̯nɛ]) is a small settlement in the hills above the right bank of the Sava River in the Municipality of Litija in central Slovenia. The area is part of the traditional region of Lower Carniola. It is now included with the rest of the municipality in the Central Sava Statistical Region.

== Church ==
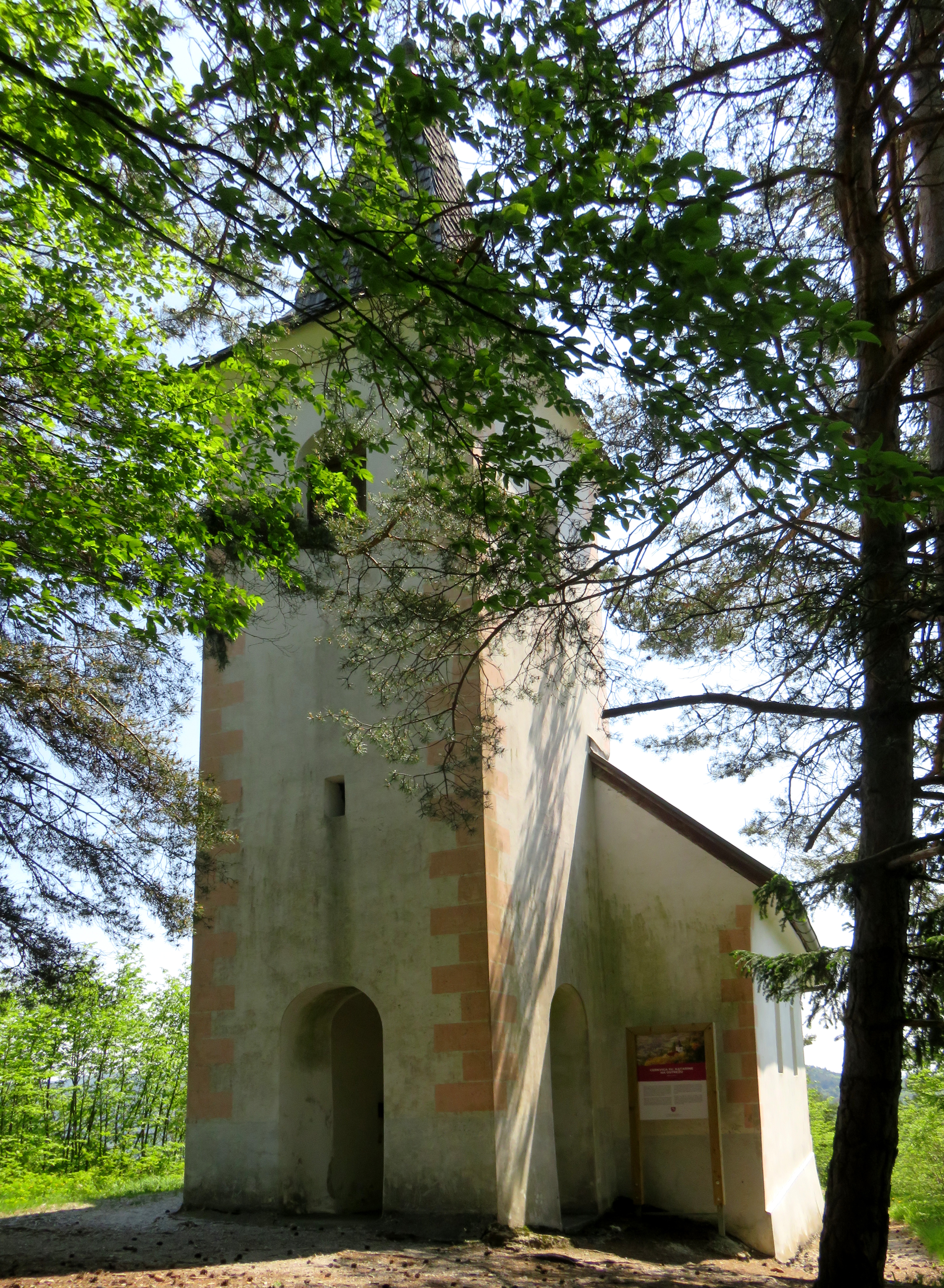
Saint Catherine's Church

The local church, built on Ostrež Hill south of the settlement, is dedicated to Saint Catherine and belongs to the Parish of Polšnik. It is a 16th-century building that was restyled in the Baroque in the 18th century.
