= Ruta, Lovrenc na Pohorju =

Ruta
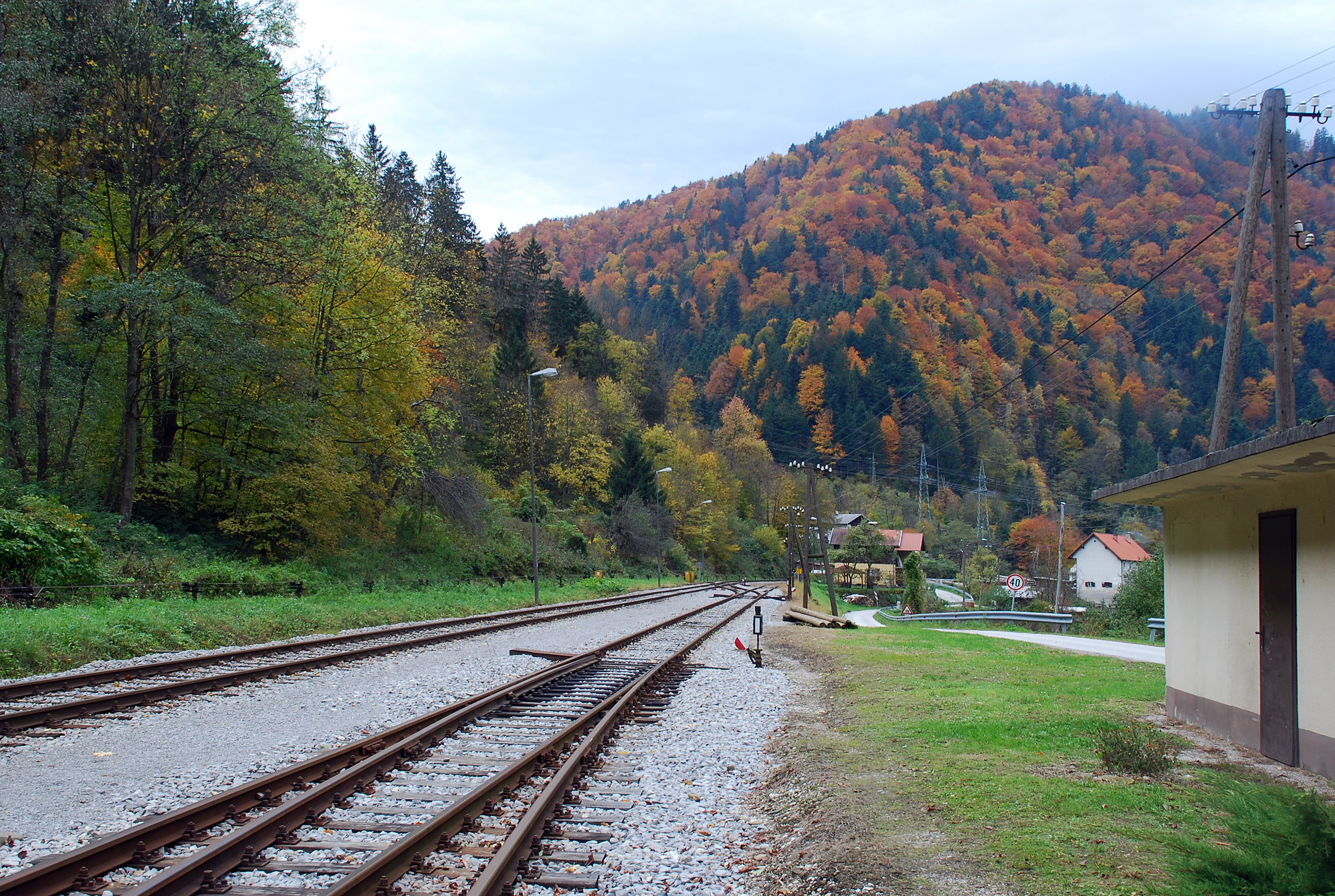
- View from the Ruta train station (Drava Railway)

- Location in Slovenia
- Coordinates: 46°33′24.14″N 15°26′47.96″E
- Country: Slovenia
- Traditional region: Styria
- Statistical region: Drava
- Municipality: Lovrenc na Pohorju

Area
  - Total: 6.53 km^{2} (2.52 sq mi)
- Elevation: 516.8 m (1,696 ft)

Population (2002)
  - Total: 111

Ruta (pronounced [ˈɾuːta]) is a dispersed settlement in the Pohorje Hills above the right bank of the Drava River in the Municipality of Lovrenc na Pohorju in northeastern Slovenia. The area is part of the traditional region of Styria. It is now included in the Drava Statistical Region.

== Name ==
The name Ruta is derived from the Slovene common noun rut, referring to a meadow on cleared land in a hilly environment. The Slovene noun is a borrowing from Middle High German rut, riute 'clearing'.

== Notable people ==
- Tatjana Bregant (1932–2002), archaeologist and prehistorian
