= Reber, Žužemberk =

Reber
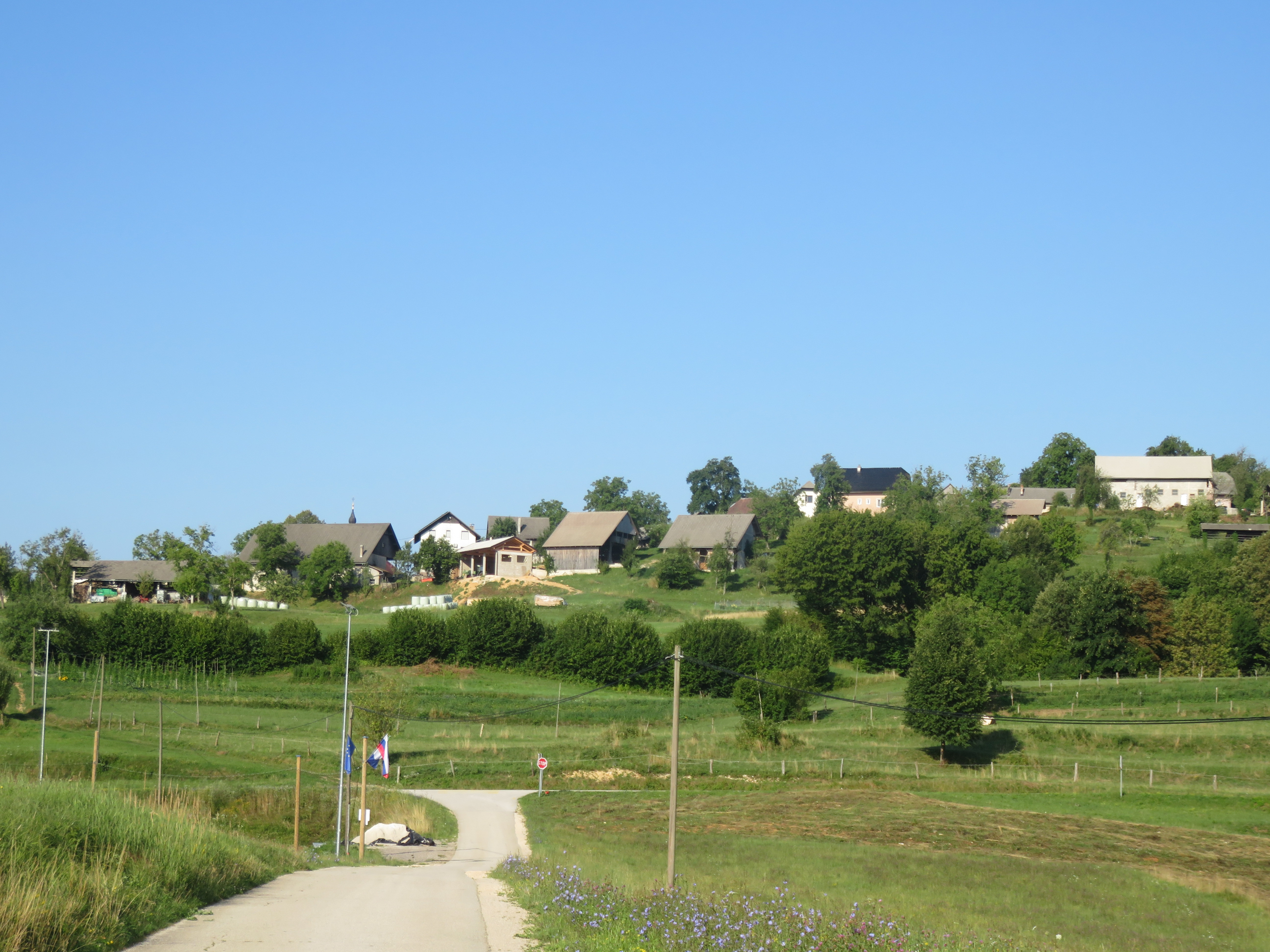

- Location in Slovenia
- Coordinates: 45°51′16.13″N 14°55′45.46″E
- Country: Slovenia
- Traditional region: Lower Carniola
- Statistical region: Southeast Slovenia
- Municipality: Žužemberk

Area
  - Total: 3.31 km^{2} (1.28 sq mi)
- Elevation: 364.9 m (1,197 ft)

Population (2002)
  - Total: 103

Reber (pronounced [ˈɾeːbəɾ]) is a village in the Municipality of Žužemberk in southeastern Slovenia. The area is part of the historical region of Lower Carniola. The municipality is now included in the Southeast Slovenia Statistical Region.

== Church ==
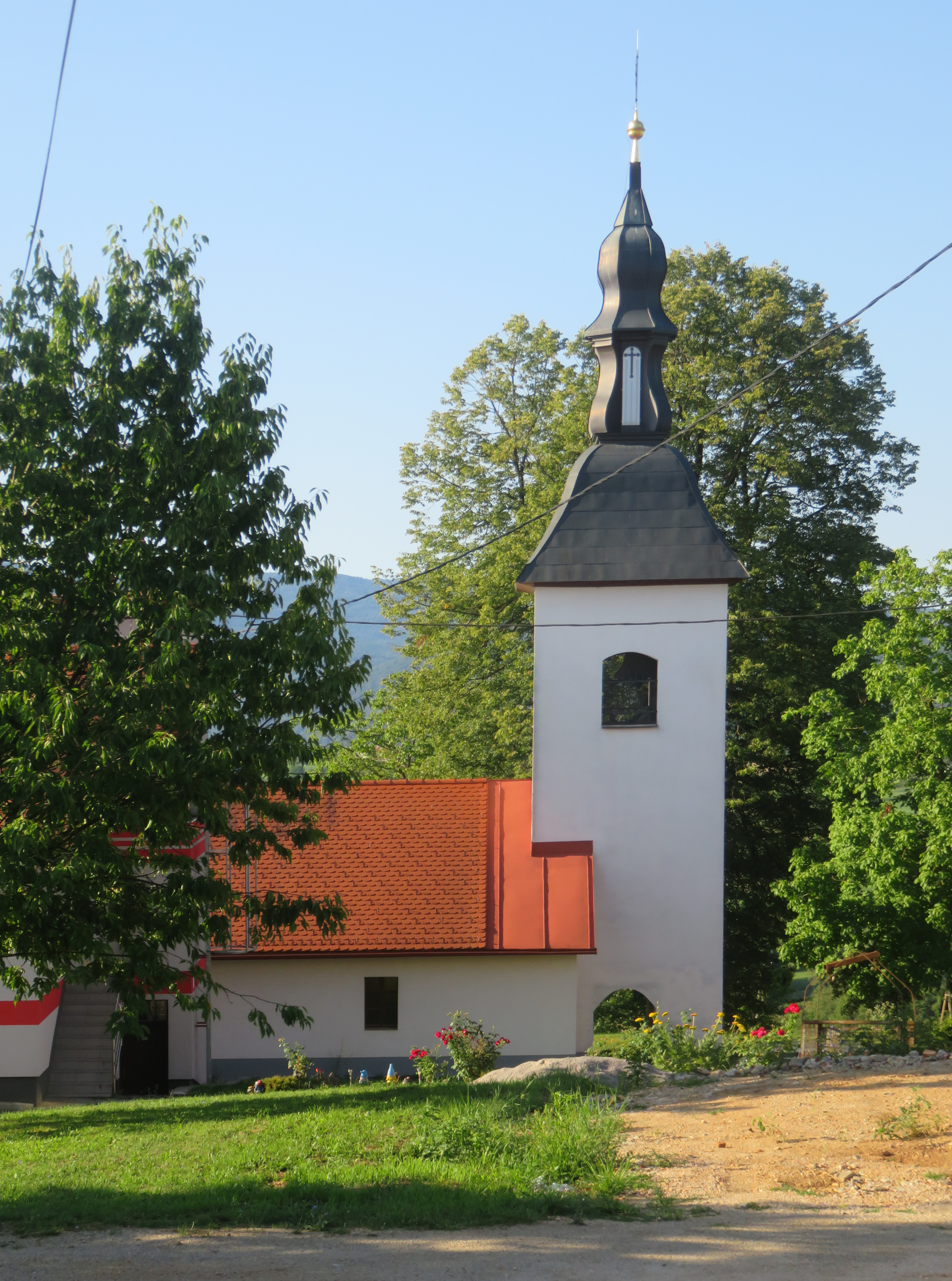
Saint Mary Magdalene Church

The local church is dedicated to Mary Magdalene and belongs to the Parish of Žužemberk. It is a medieval building that was heavily damaged in bombing during the Second World War and only hastily repaired.
