= Rača, Domžale =

Rača
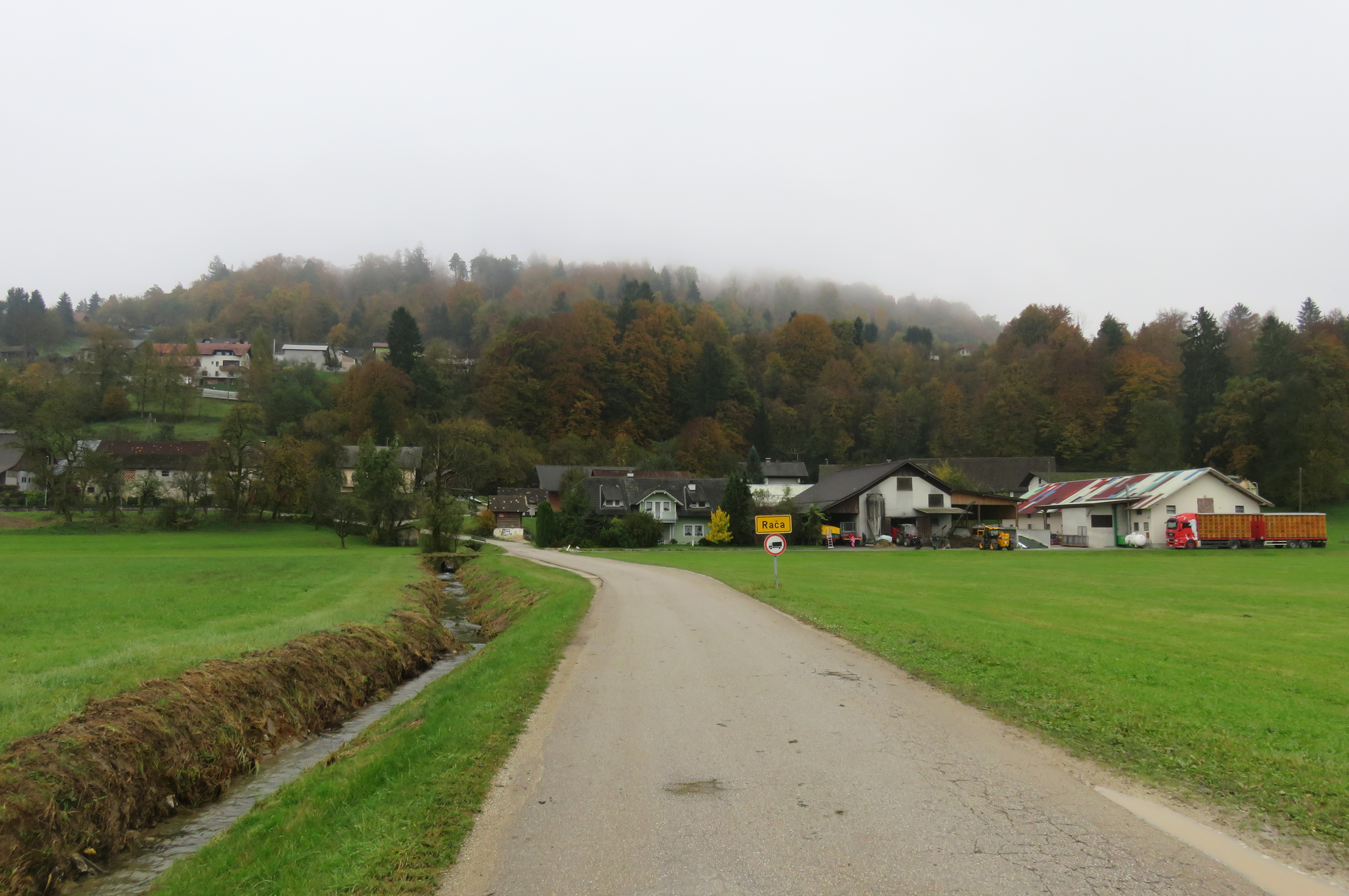

- Location in Slovenia
- Coordinates: 46°7′59.55″N 14°39′44.45″E
- Country: Slovenia
- Traditional region: Upper Carniola
- Statistical region: Central Slovenia
- Municipality: Domžale

Area
  - Total: 0.48 km^{2} (0.19 sq mi)
- Elevation: 310.1 m (1,017 ft)

Population (2020)
  - Total: 27
  - Density: 56/km^{2} (150/sq mi)

Rača (pronounced [ˈɾaːtʃa]) is a small settlement east of Domžale in the Upper Carniola region of Slovenia. Rača Creek, a tributary of the Kamnik Bistrica River, runs through the settlement.
