= Rožni Vrh, Trebnje =

Rožni Vrh
- Location in Slovenia
- Coordinates: 45°54′40.6″N 14°59′30.73″E
- Country: Slovenia
- Traditional region: Lower Carniola
- Statistical region: Southeast Slovenia
- Municipality: Trebnje

Area
  - Total: 0.33 km^{2} (0.13 sq mi)
- Elevation: 292.6 m (960 ft)

Population (2002)
  - Total: 68

Rožni Vrh (pronounced [ˈɾoːʒni ˈʋəɾx]) is a small settlement on the left bank of the Temenica River, just west of Trebnje in eastern Slovenia. The area is part of the historical region of Lower Carniola. The Municipality of Trebnje is now included in the Southeast Slovenia Statistical Region.
