= Rdeči Kal, Ivančna Gorica =

Rdeči Kal
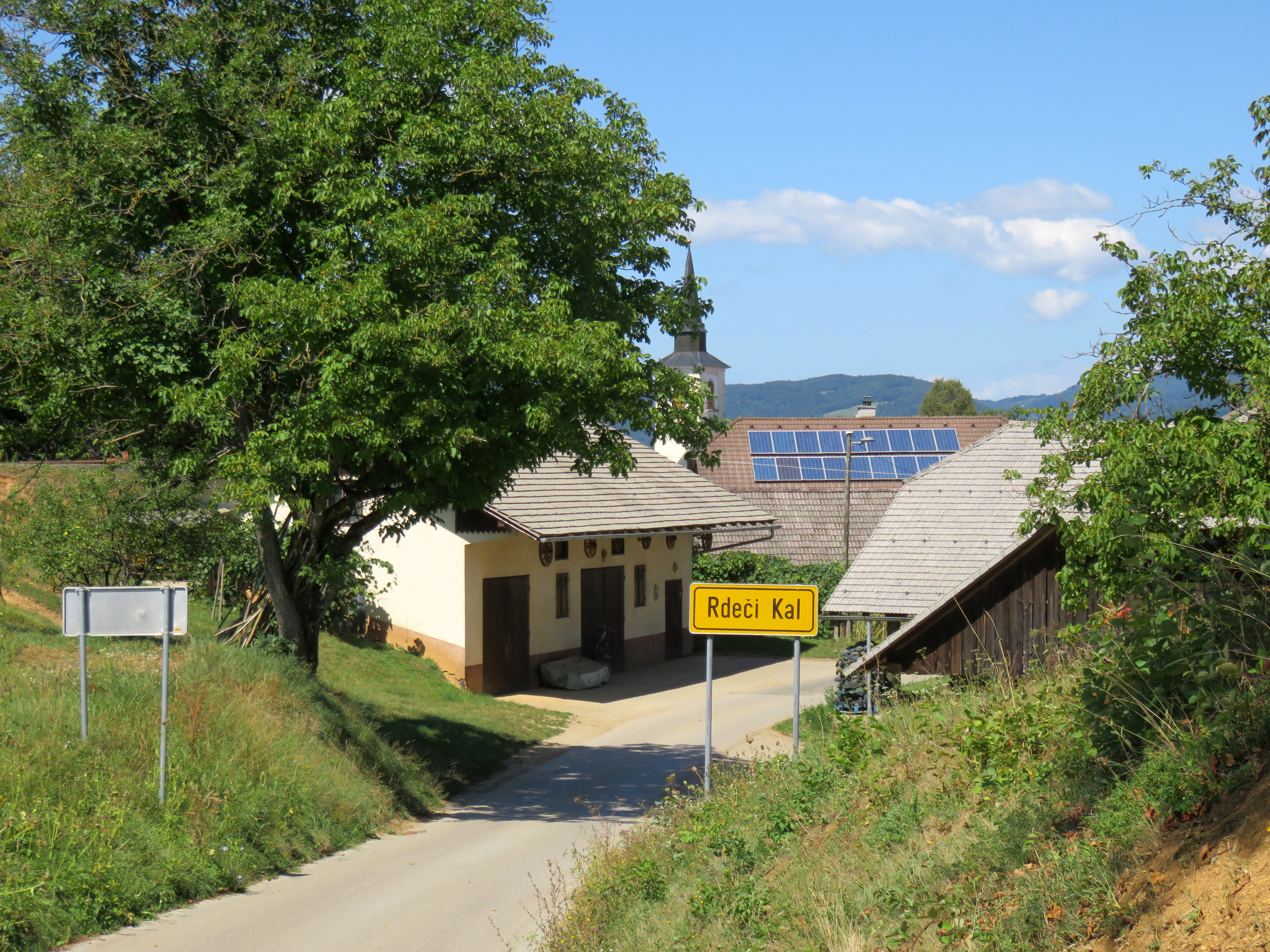

- Location in Slovenia
- Coordinates: 45°55′12.36″N 14°51′29.44″E
- Country: Slovenia
- Traditional region: Lower Carniola
- Statistical region: Central Slovenia
- Municipality: Ivančna Gorica

Area
  - Total: 1.86 km^{2} (0.72 sq mi)
- Elevation: 39 m (128 ft)

Population (2002)
  - Total: 39

Rdeči Kal (pronounced [əɾˈdeːtʃi ˈkaːw]; in older sources also Rudeči Kal, German: Rothenkal) is a small village south of Dob pri Šentvidu in the Municipality of Ivančna Gorica in central Slovenia. The area is part of the historical region of Lower Carniola. The municipality is now included in the Central Slovenia Statistical Region.

== Church ==
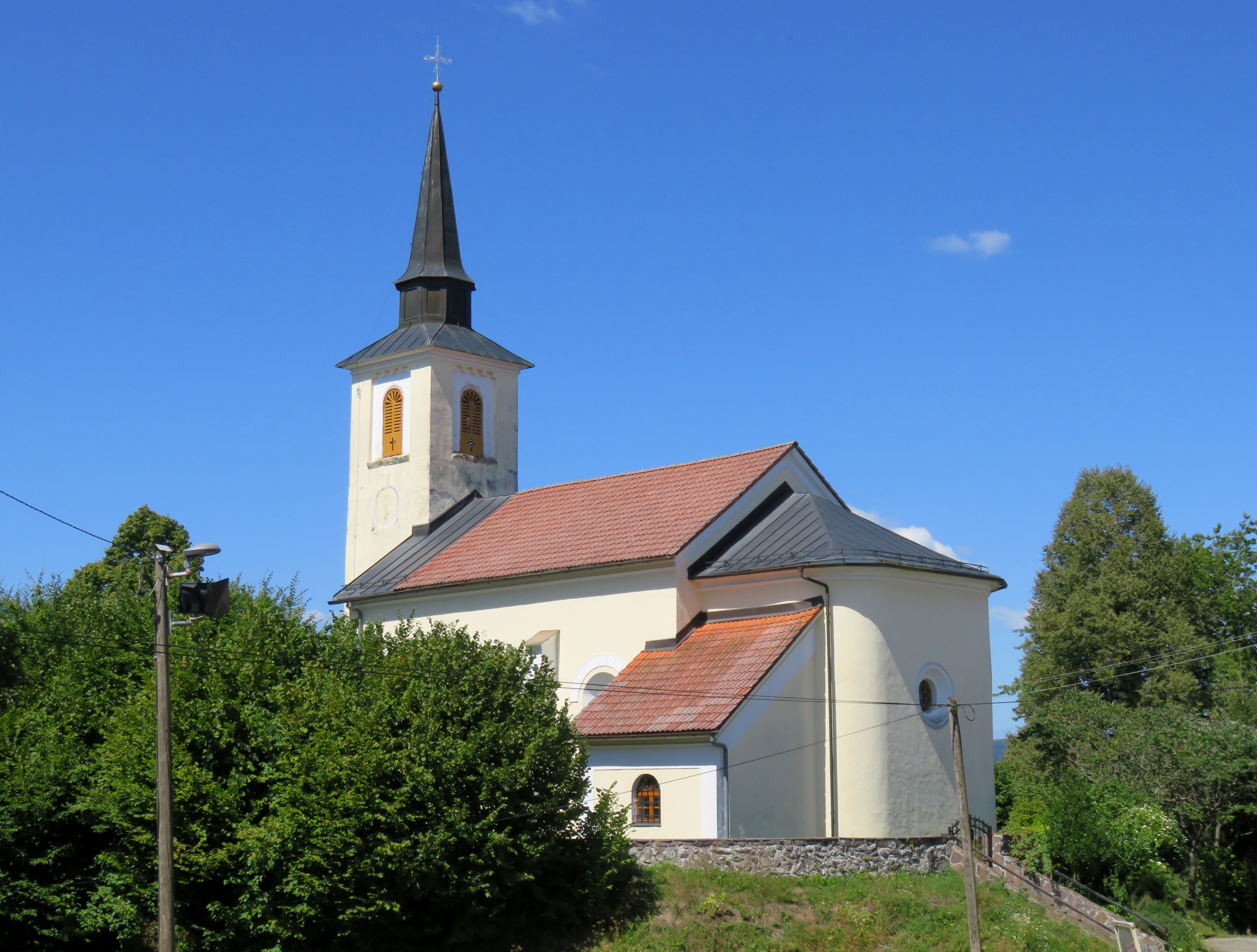
Saint Anthony's Church

The local church is dedicated to Saint Anthony the Hermit and belongs to the Parish of Šentvid pri Stični. It was originally an early 16th-century building, but was almost entirely rebuilt in the 19th century.
