= Tatjana Bregant =

Slovene archaeologist (1932–2002)

- Born: 16 February 1932
- Died: 15 February 2002 (aged 69)
- Education: University of Ljubljana
- Occupations: Archaeologist; prehistorian
- Employer: University of Ljubljana

Tatjana Bregant (16 February 1932 – 15 February 2002) was a Slovenian archaeologist and prehistorian, who was Professor of Pre-Metallic Archaeology at the University of Ljubljana. She was President of the Prehistoric Sections of both the Union of Archaeological Societies of Yugoslavia and the Slovenian Archaeological Society.

== Biography ==
Bregant was born on 16 February 1932 in Ruta, Lovrenc na Pohorju. She graduated with a degree in Archaeology from the Faculty of Arts of the University of Ljubljana in 1955. From 1964 she was editor of the Report on Paleolithic, Neolithic and Eneolithic Research in Slovenia. The same institution awarded her a doctorate in 1966; it was entitled 'Ornamentation on ceramics of the Neolithic period in Yugoslavia'. One of her supervisors was Josip Korǒsec (sl). She subsequently worked as a lecturer at the University of Ljubljana, where she specialised in Neolithic ceramics, archaeological drawing and ceramic conservation. Her research on Neolithic archaeology in Slovenia led her to the conclusion that there were three distinct periods.

From 1972 to 1976 she was President of the Prehistoric Sections of both the Union of Archaeological Societies of Yugoslavia and the Slovenian Archaeological Society. In 1984 she was appointed Professor of Pre-Metallic Archaeology. She led excavations in the Ljubljana Marshes and at the Celje Castle. The excavations at Spodnje Mostišce in the marsh were still considered in 2004 as the most advanced archaeological investigations to have taken place in the area. Other sites she worked on included Blatna Brezovica, Drulovka, Korta and Pavlovsko Vrh. In 1996 she curated an exhibition at the City Museum of Ljubljana which explored Slovenia's archaeology from prehistory to the Middle Ages.

== Selected publications ==
- Bregant, Tatjana. "Prispevek biološko-tehničnih disciplin k proučevanju kulture Ljubljanskega barja." Godišnjak Centra za balkanološka ispitivanja 13 (1976): 85–96.
- Bregant, Tatjana. "Ornament na keramiki jugoslovanskega neolitika in stil prostora." Arheološki vestnik 19 (1968).
- Bregant, Tatjana. "Trgovina in menjalno gospodarstvo v neolitiku Jugoslavije." Arheološki vestnik 6.1 (1955).
