= Lovrenc na Pohorju =

Lovrenc na Pohorju Sveti Lovrenc na Pohorju (until 1952)
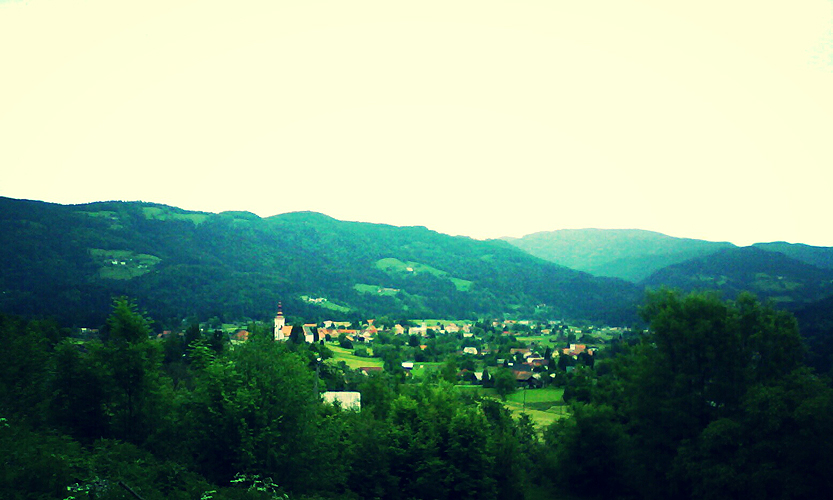
- Lovrenc na Pohorju

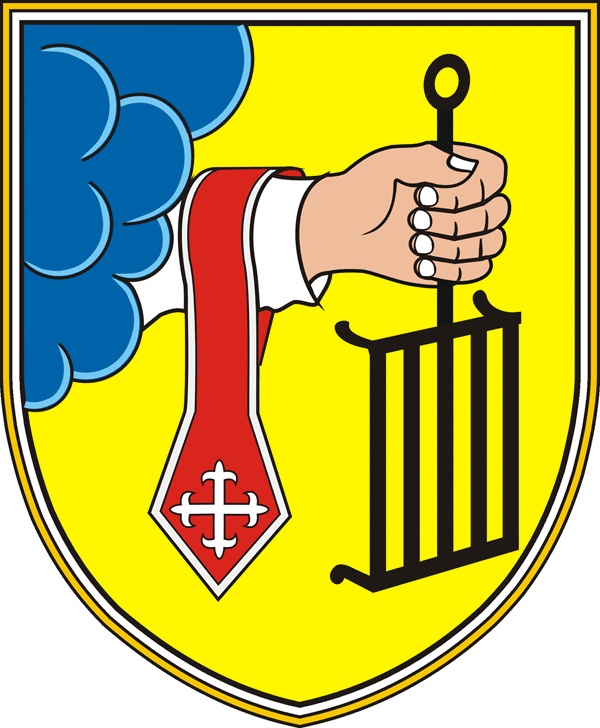
- Flag Coat of arms

- Location of the settlement of Lovrenc na Pohorju in Slovenia
- Coordinates: 46°32′17.17″N 15°23′3.71″E
- Country: Slovenia
- Traditional region: Styria
- Statistical region: Drava
- Municipality: Lovrenc na Pohorju
- 459

Population (2012)
  - Total: 1,992
- Time zone: UTC+01 (CET)
  - Summer (DST): UTC+02 (CEST)

Lovrenc na Pohorju (pronounced [ˈlɔ́ːwɾɛnts na ˈpóːxɔɾju]; German: Sankt Lorenzen an der Kärntnerbahn or Sankt Lorenzen ob Marburg; locally Šentloranc) is a settlement in northeastern Slovenia. It lies in the Pohorje Hills to the west of Maribor. The area is part of the traditional region of Styria. It is now included in the Drava Statistical Region. It is the seat of the Municipality of Lovrenc na Pohorju.

== Name ==
The name of the settlement was changed from Sveti Lovrenc na Pohorju (literally, 'Saint Lawrence on Pohorje') to Lovrenc na Pohorju (literally, 'Lawrence on Pohorje') in 1952. The name was changed on the basis of the 1948 Law on Names of Settlements and Designations of Squares, Streets, and Buildings as part of efforts by Slovenia's postwar communist government to remove religious elements from toponyms.

== Churches ==
The parish church from which the settlement gets its name is dedicated to Saint Lawrence and belongs to the Roman Catholic Archdiocese of Maribor. It was first mentioned in written documents dating to the 12th century. It was rebuilt in 1407 and extensively remodeled in the 18th century. Two other churches in the settlement are dedicated to Saint Radegund and to the Holy Cross. Both date to the 17th century.

A community of Jehovah's Witnesses has also been living in Lovrenc na Pohorju since at least the 1970s and built a Kingdom Hall around 2000.
