= Mali Trn =

- Location in Slovenia
- Coordinates: 45°57′45.22″N 15°24′17.5″E
- Country: Slovenia
- Traditional region: Lower Carniola
- Statistical region: Lower Sava
- Municipality: Krško

Area
  - Total: 1.23 km^{2} (0.47 sq mi)
- Elevation: 442.8 m (1,453 ft)

Population (2002)
  - Total: 35
- Postal code: 8270

Mali Trn (pronounced [ˈmaːli ˈtəɾn]; German: Kleindorn) is a small village in the Municipality of Krško in eastern Slovenia. The area is part of the traditional region of Lower Carniola. It is now included with the rest of the municipality in the Lower Sava Statistical Region.

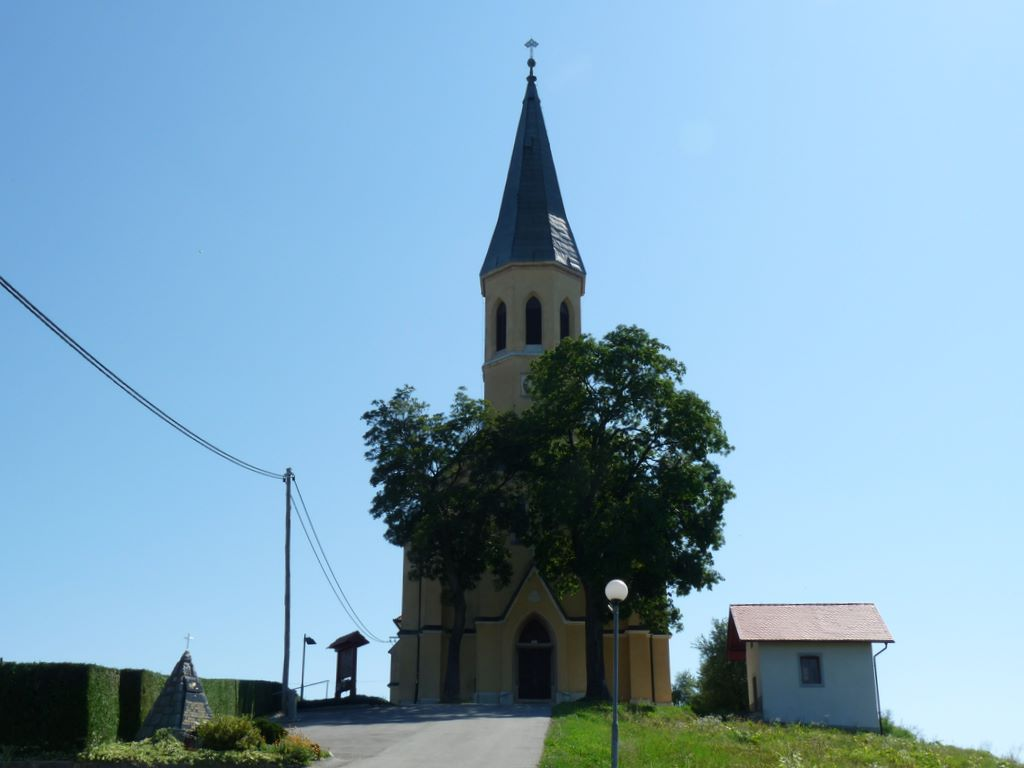
Holy Spirit Church

The parish church of the Parish of Sveti Duh–Veliki. Trn is the local church west of the settlement core. It is dedicated to the Holy Spirit and belongs to the Roman Catholic Diocese of Novo Mesto. It was built in 1885 in a Neo-Gothic style.
