= Ržišče, Litija =

Ržišče
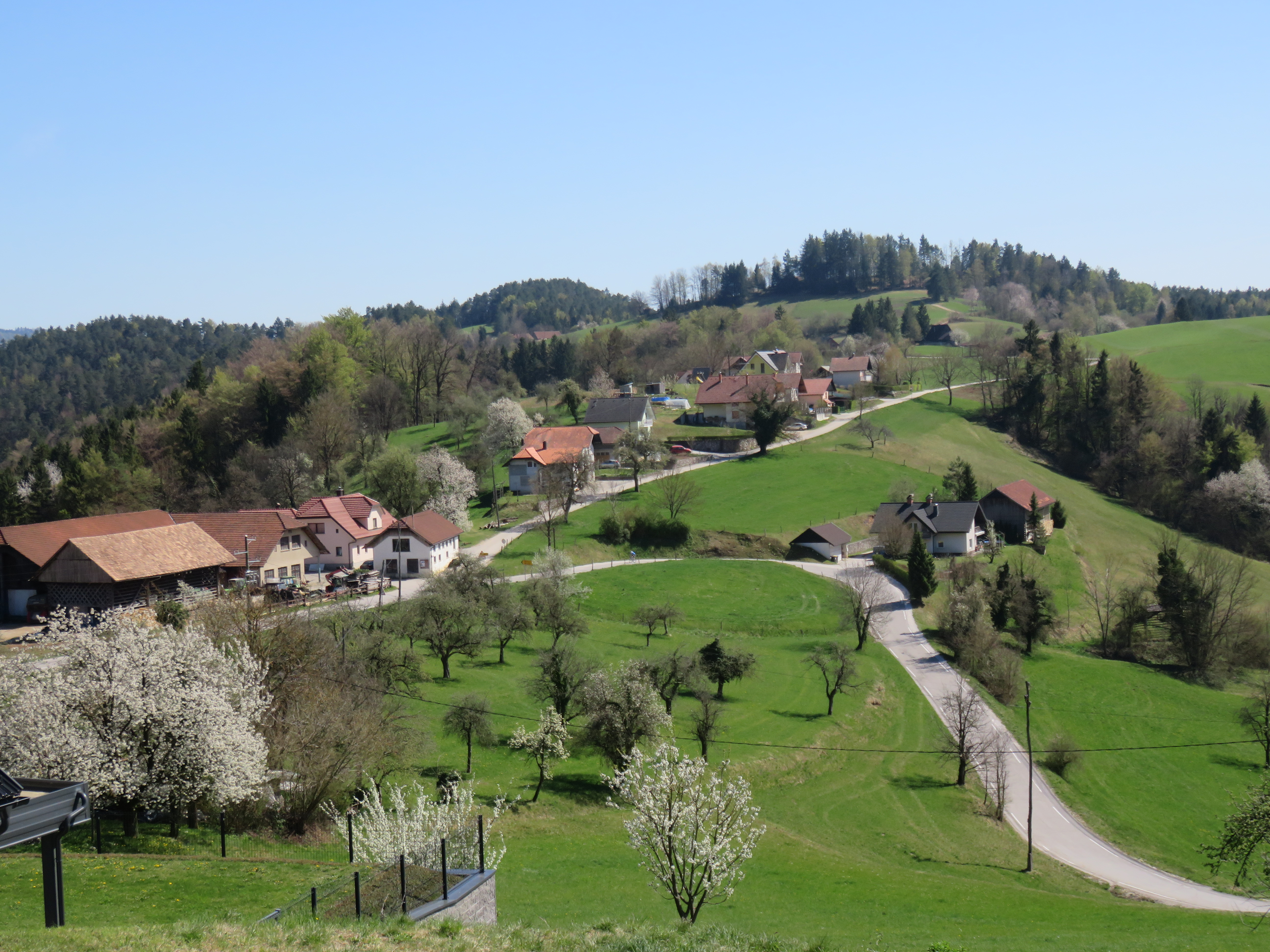

- Location in Slovenia
- Coordinates: 46°6′44.5″N 14°50′30.4″E
- Country: Slovenia
- Traditional region: Upper Carniola
- Statistical region: Central Sava
- Municipality: Litija

Area
  - Total: 2.79 km^{2} (1.08 sq mi)
- Elevation: 426.7 m (1,400 ft)

Population (2002)
  - Total: 58
- Postal code: 1252

Ržišče (pronounced [əɾˈʒiːʃtʃɛ]; in older sources also Režišče, German: Archische) is a small settlement in the Municipality of Litija in central Slovenia. It lies in the hills above the left bank of the Sava River, just south of Vače. The area is part of the traditional region of Upper Carniola. It is now included with the rest of the municipality in the Central Sava Statistical Region.
