= Rakovec, Brežice =

Rakovec
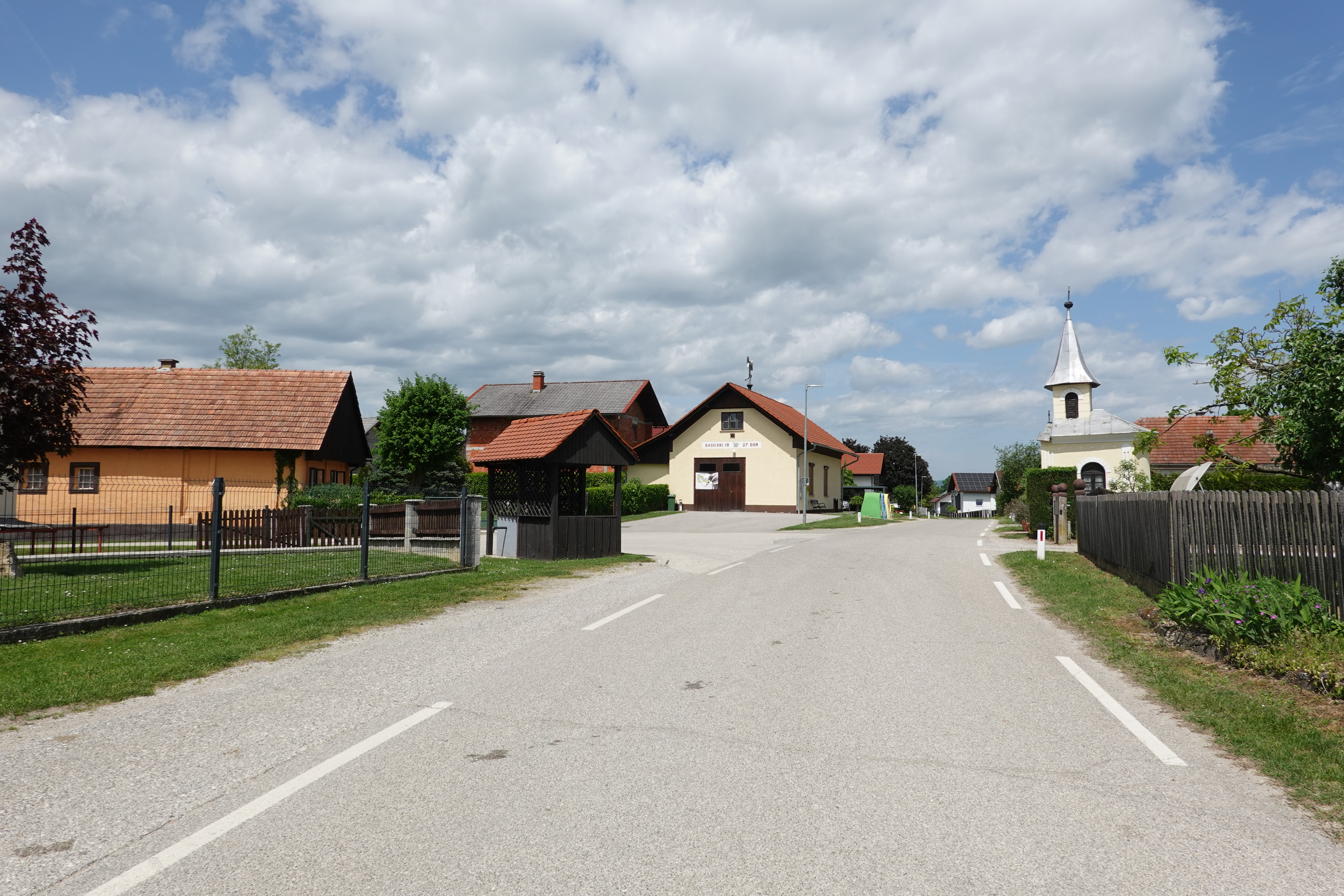

- Location in Slovenia
- Coordinates: 45°55′21.69″N 15°42′10.01″E
- Country: Slovenia
- Traditional region: Styria
- Statistical region: Lower Sava
- Municipality: Brežice

Area
  - Total: 0.99 km^{2} (0.38 sq mi)
- Elevation: 155.5 m (510 ft)

Population (2020)
  - Total: 47
  - Density: 47/km^{2} (120/sq mi)

Rakovec (pronounced [ˈɾaːkɔʋəts]; in older sources also Radkovec, German: Radkovetz) is a settlement on the right bank of the Sotla River in the Municipality of Brežice in eastern Slovenia. The area is part of the traditional region of Styria. It is now included with the rest of the municipality in the Lower Sava Statistical Region.

The Jovsi wetland lies west of the village. During construction work in the regulation of the Sotla River, chance finds from the Late Bronze Age point to the existence of a so far unexcavated site in the area.
