= Ravni Dol, Ivančna Gorica =

Ravni Dol
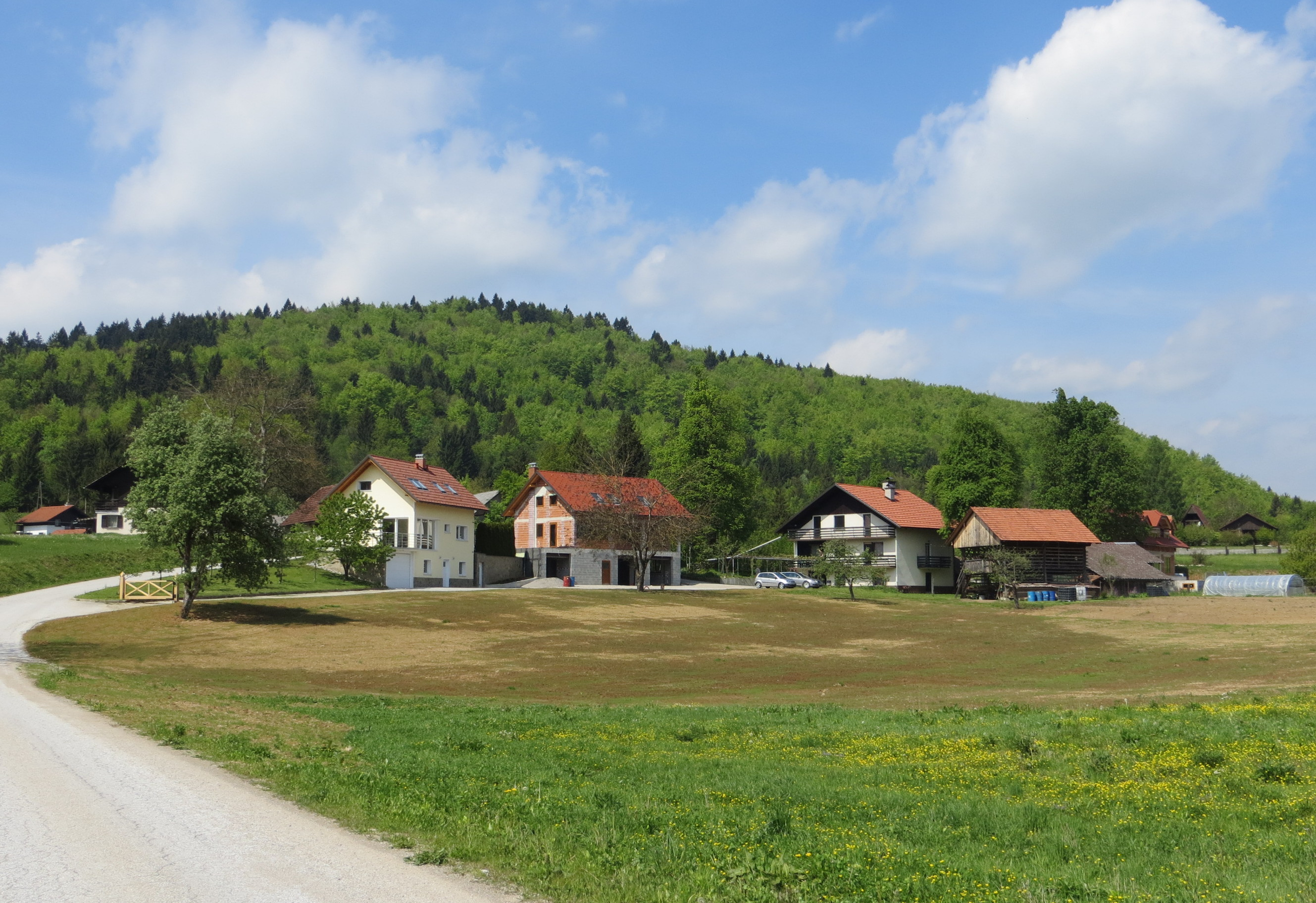

- Location in Slovenia
- Coordinates: 45°53′34.86″N 14°45′8.36″E
- Country: Slovenia
- Traditional region: Lower Carniola
- Statistical region: Central Slovenia
- Municipality: Ivančna Gorica

Area
  - Total: 1.19 km^{2} (0.46 sq mi)
- Elevation: 466.5 m (1,531 ft)

Population (2002)
  - Total: 24

Ravni Dol (pronounced [ˈɾaːwni ˈdoːw]; German: Randul) is a small settlement in the hills northwest of Krka in the Municipality of Ivančna Gorica in central Slovenia. The area is part of the historical region of Lower Carniola. The municipality is now included in the Central Slovenia Statistical Region.

A small roadside chapel-shrine in the western part of the settlement was built in 1932. It contains a statue of the Virgin Mary.
