= Ravne, Cerknica =

Ravne
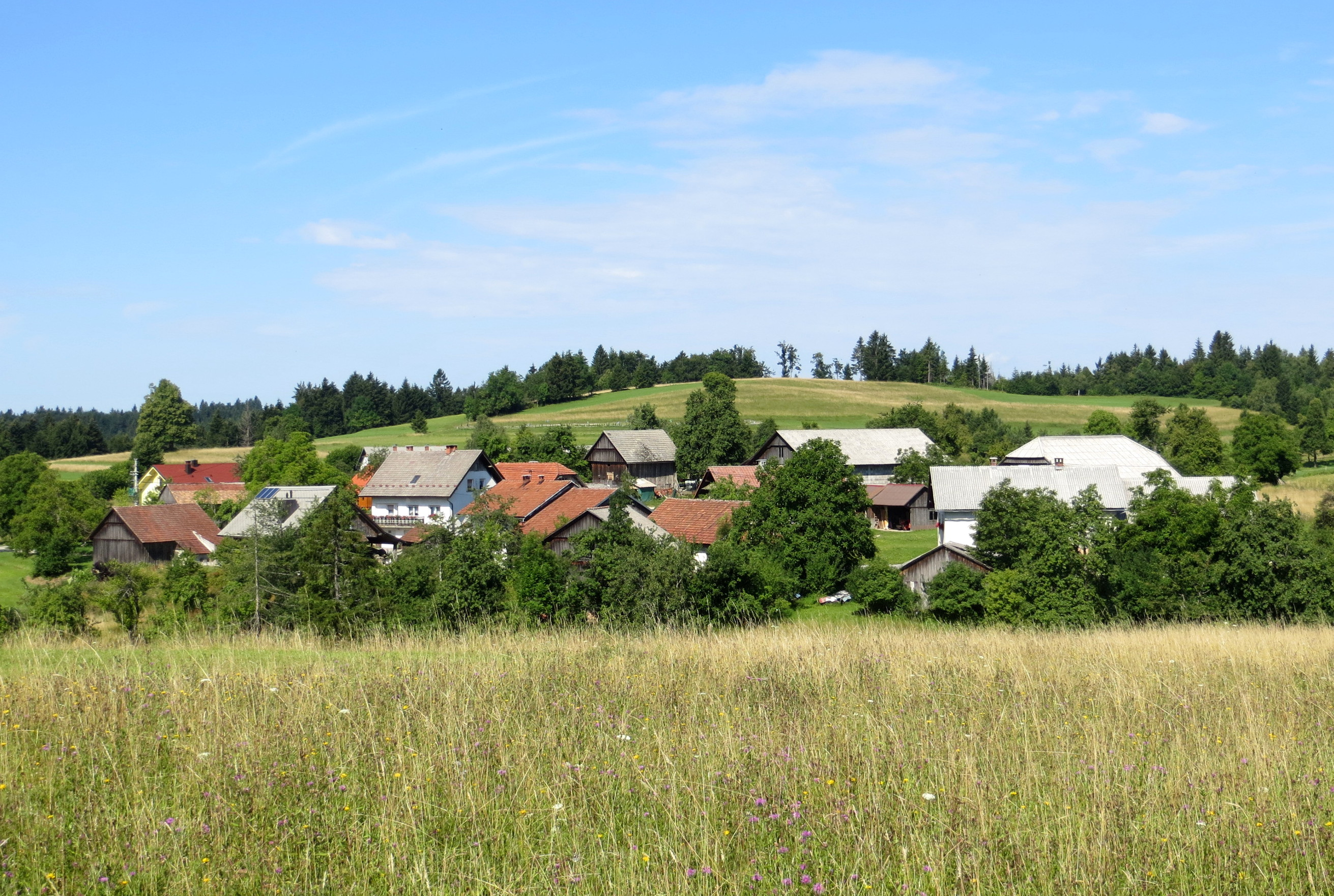

- Location in Slovenia
- Coordinates: 45°50′35.78″N 14°29′6.97″E
- Country: Slovenia
- Traditional region: Inner Carniola
- Statistical region: Littoral–Inner Carniola
- Municipality: Cerknica

Area
  - Total: 1.44 km^{2} (0.56 sq mi)
- Elevation: 807.6 m (2,650 ft)

Population (2020)
  - Total: 28
  - Density: 19/km^{2} (50/sq mi)

Ravne (pronounced [ˈɾáːwnɛ]) is a small settlement in the hills northeast of Cerknica in the Inner Carniola region of Slovenia. It is around 20 km south of Ljubljana.
