= Raka, Krško =

Raka
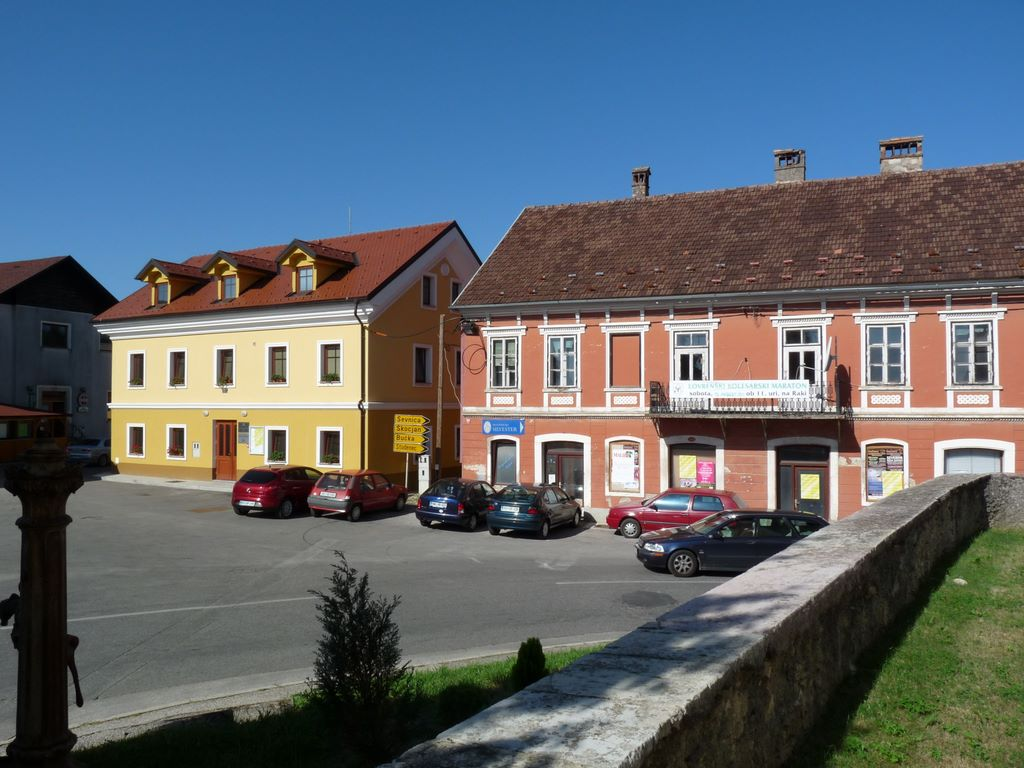

- Location in Slovenia
- Coordinates: 45°55′42.74″N 15°22′56.3″E
- Country: Slovenia
- Traditional region: Lower Carniola
- Statistical region: Lower Sava
- Municipality: Krško

Area
  - Total: 1.24 km^{2} (0.48 sq mi)
- Elevation: 263.8 m (865 ft)

Population (2015)
  - Total: 345
  - Density: 278/km^{2} (720/sq mi)
- Postal code: 8274

Raka (pronounced [ˈɾàːka]; German: Arch) is a village in the Municipality of Krško in eastern Slovenia. The area is part of the traditional region of Lower Carniola. It is now included with the rest of the municipality in the Lower Sava Statistical Region. The village is known for a quality variety of onion.

== Name ==
Raka was attested in written sources in 1161 as Arch (and as Archa in 1249, and Arch in 1279). The Slovene name is derived from the common noun raka 'wooden cladding preventing water erosion of a bank' or 'cladded chute carrying water to a mill'. Both the Slovene and German names are ultimately derived from Latin arca 'box'.

== Church ==
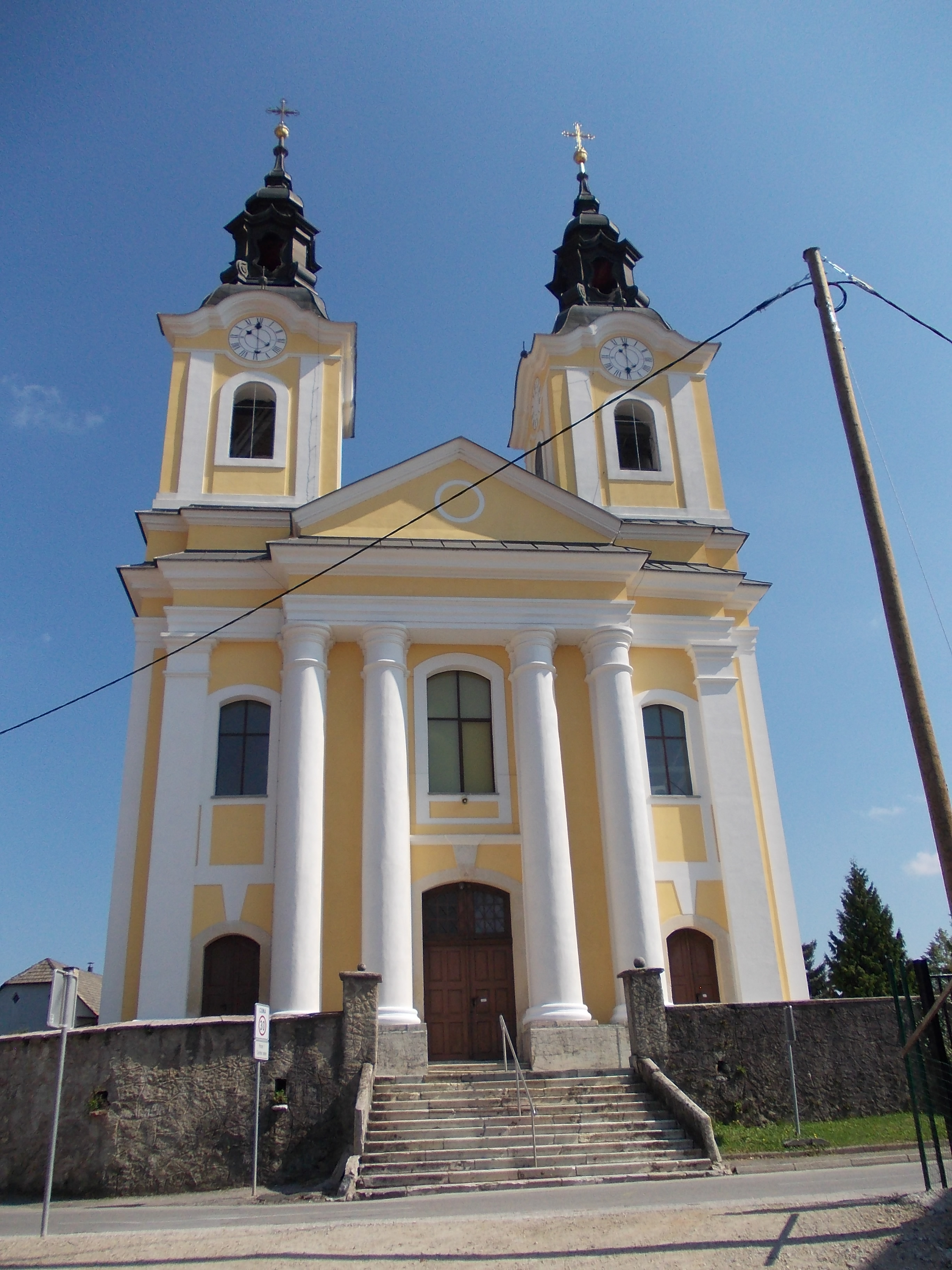
St. Lawrence's Church

The parish church in the centre of the settlement is dedicated to Saint Lawrence and belongs to the Roman Catholic Diocese of Novo Mesto. It is a Late Baroque church built between 1799 and 1804 on the site of an earlier building. It has two belfries.

== Raka Castle ==
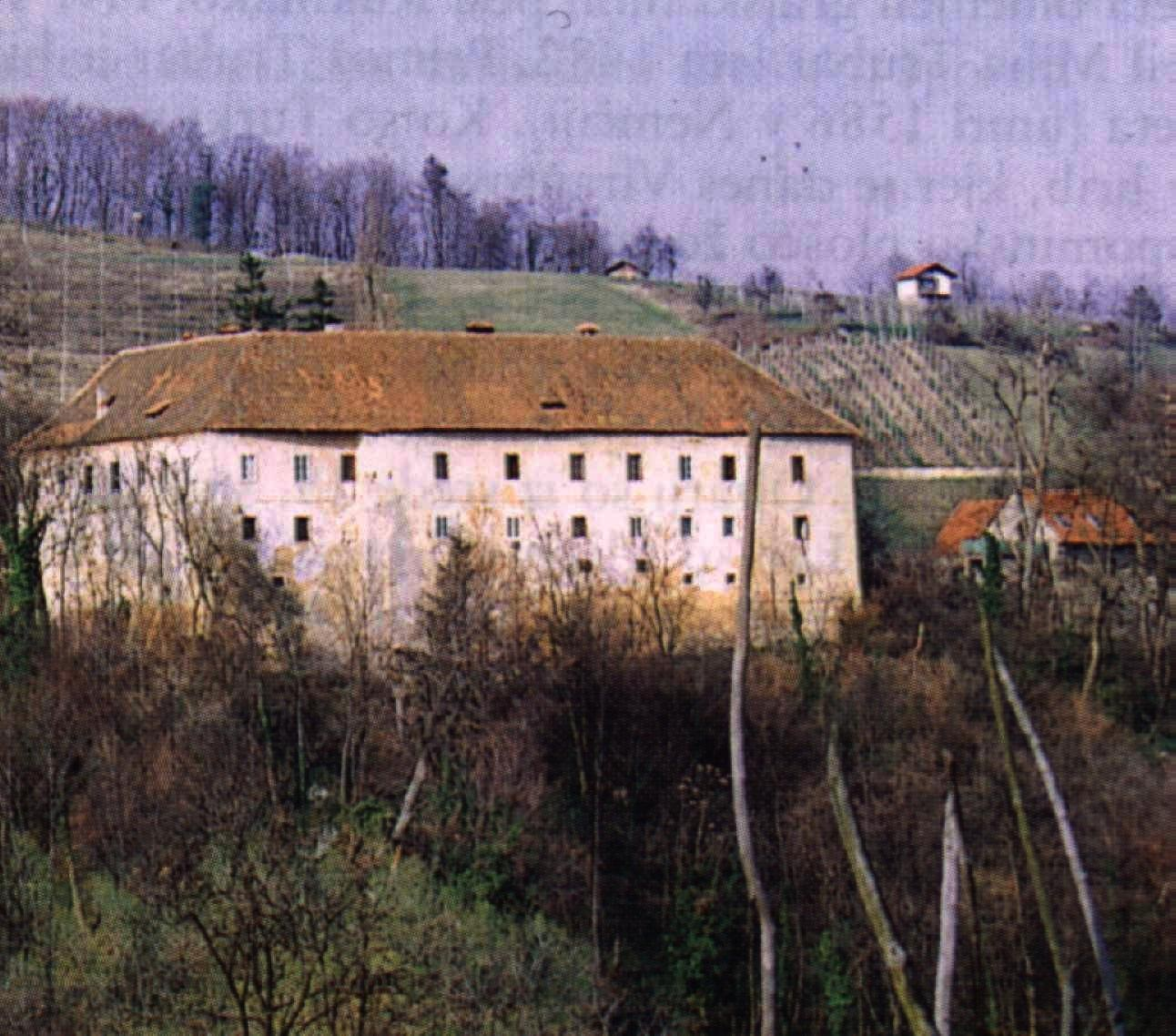
Raka Castle (1995)

Raka Castle is a castle west of the main settlement. It is one of the oldest castles in Slovenia as far as written sources are concerned, mentioned in documents dating to the 12th century. It was destroyed in a peasant revolt in 1515. The current building dates to the major refurbishing and rebuilding in the late 18th and early 19th centuries.

== Notable people ==
Notable people that were born or lived in Raka include:

- Andrej Recelj (?–ca. 1600), vicar and the translator of Gorske bukve (1582), the first legal text in Slovene
- Martin Humek (1870–1943), beekeeper
- Amalija Ulčnik, the mother of Melania Trump, is a native of Raka, and the daughter of the local man who created the Raka red onion by crossing Egyptian and Ptuj onions.
- Ivan Tavčar, (1851–1923) Slovenian writer, lawyer, and politician.
- Vili Resnik, (1963) Slovenian rock singer and guitarist, represented Slovenia in Eurovision Song Contest in 1998
- Miran Rudan, (1965) Slovenian pop and rock singer (Pop Design)
