= Camillo Bregant =

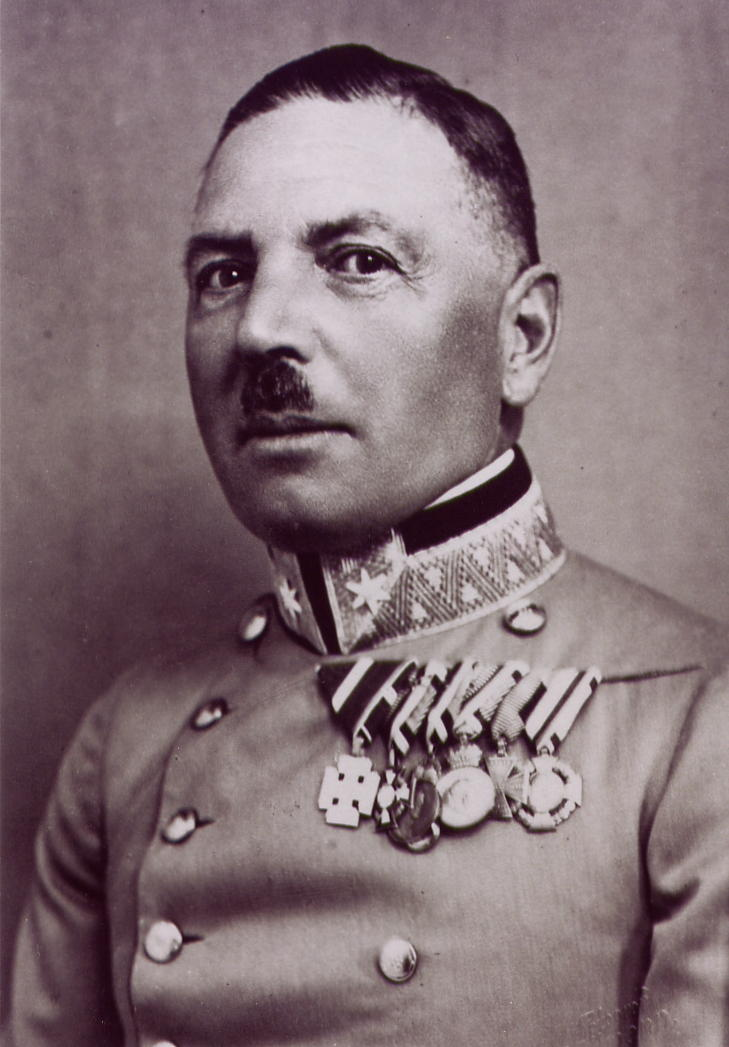
- Major General Camillo Bregant 1932
- Born: 24 June 1879; Triest
- Died: 21 February 1956 (aged 76); Graz, Austria
- Military career
- Allegiance: Austrian Empire; Austria-Hungary (to 1918); First Austrian Republic (to 1934)
- Branch: Bundesheer
- Service years: 1899-1934
- Rank: Generalmajor
- Units: 5th Styrian, Carinthian and Carniolan Dragoons "Nicholas I Emperor of Russia's Own"
- Conflicts: First World War: Eastern Front; Italian Campaign
- Awards: Military Merit Cross

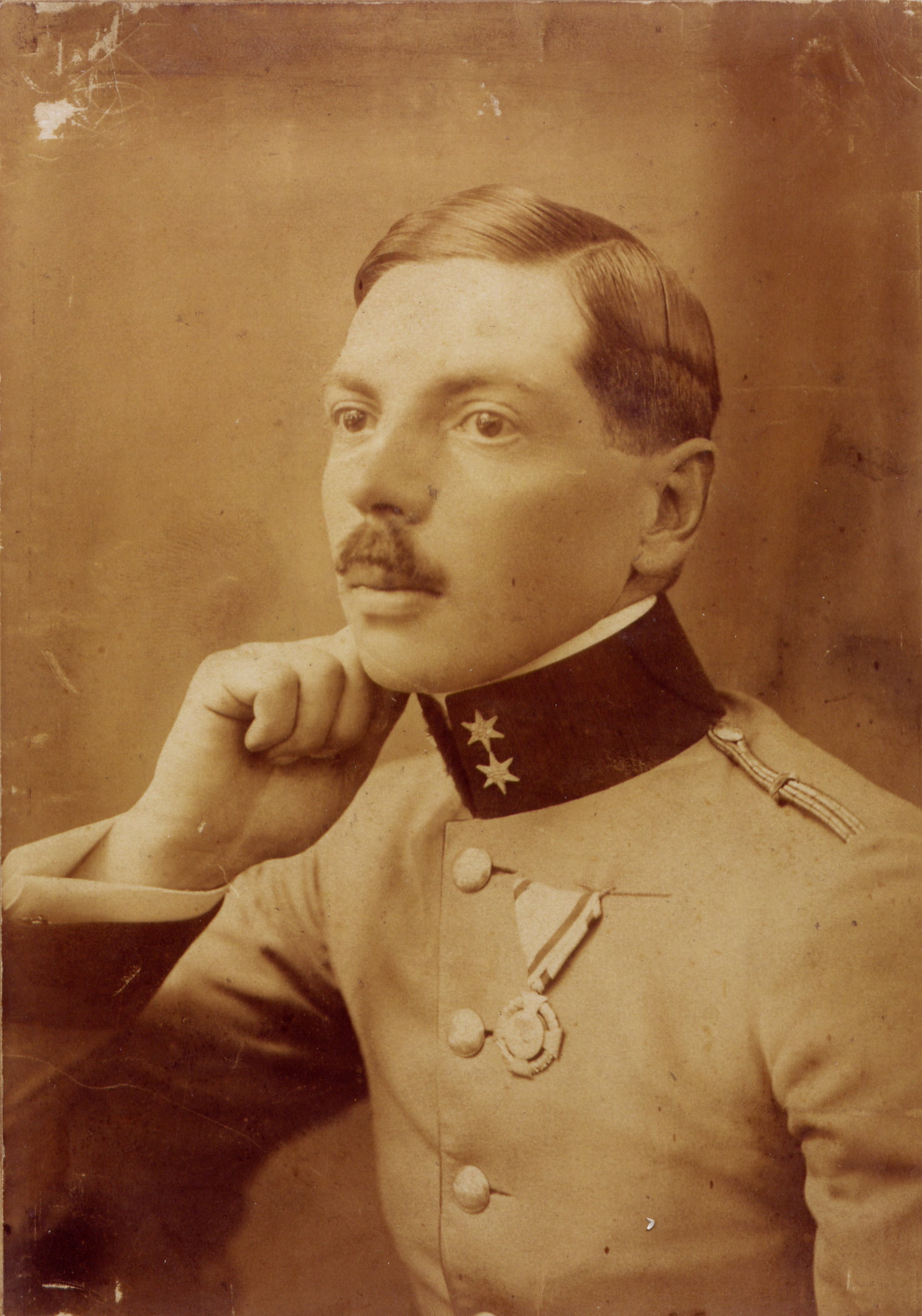
Camillo Bregant around 1905

Camillo Bregant (24 July 1879 – 21 February 1956) was a Major General, a colonel of the former 5th Styrian, Carinthian and Carniolan Dragoons "Nicholas I Emperor of Russia's Own" (Steirisch-Kärntnerisch-Krainerisches Dragoner-Regiment „Nikolaus I. Kaiser von Rußland“ Nr. 5) and a leading officer of the Austrian Armed Forces in the First Republic of Austria.

== Life ==
Bregant was born in Trieste, at the time in the Austrian Littoral. After graduating from infantry cadet school, Bregant was assigned as a second lieutenant to Dragoon Regiment No. 5 Nicholas I of Russia in the Austro-Hungarian Army on 18 August 1899 (the emperors birthday) in Marburg. He became one of the most successful racehorse owners and jockeys amongst the monarchy of the time. In the 389 sprints he participated in, he came in first 164 times, second 144 times and third 31 times. In stark contrast to the 2,400 Austrian Crowns income of a young lieutenant, his successes culminated in a prize money of over 150,000 Crowns and gave him a well above average income for that time.

Because of his outstanding capabilities he was ordered to the Military Horse Training Institute as an instructor from 1904 to 1906. In 1911 he went on to attend the Corps Officer School in Vienna.

During the World War I Bregant took part as Captain and leader of the 4th Squadron of the Dragoon Regiment No.5 in the following military actions.

- 1914 Took part in the fighting in Poland Battle of Lemberg, the Siege of Przemysl, the battle in the Carpathian Mountains and Hungary.
- 1915 Battle of Gorlice Tarnow, in eastern Galicia, Trieste, and on the Dniester.
- 1916 Took part n in the defense of the Brusilov offensive
- 1917 The Regiment was allocated to the 4th Cavalry Division under his former (1909) Regimental Commander and Colonel then Feldmarschallleutnant Otto Josef von Berndt (1865-1957).
- 1918 Treaty of Brest-Litovsk (Ukraine–Central Powers) with Soviet Russia. The regiment was withdrawn from the frontier, relocated to Marburg and remained there until 1920 in the local cavalry barracks.
- 1920 During this year the regiment was mostly dissolved and the remaining parts were marched to Graz. The 5th Squadron of the First Federal Army was formed in the Great Cavalry Barracks in St. Leonhard Graz from the remnants of the regiment that had reached Graz,

On 1 November 1918, Bregant was promoted to the rank of Major and after 21.5 years of service in the Austro-Hungarian Army he was adopted by the Army of the First Republic. In 1922 he was given command of the Dragoon Regiment No.5, which was probably operated as an enhanced squadron for cost reasons. During 1929 he was promoted to Inspector of Cavalry of the Austrian army and commander of the cavalry barracks in Graz; In 1932 he was promoted to Generalmajor and then he was placed in temporary retirement in 1934 : (due to political uncertainty in the Ständestaat as "notoriously loyal to the Austrian Emperor"). In the German army he was listed as Generalmajor ZV.

After World War II during his retirement Bregant was busy as winery owner, as President of the Campagnereiter Society group of Styria and acted as mentor for the later highly successful Austrian military rider and Military pentathlon Colonel Peter Lichtner-Hoyer.

From 1920 to 1956, he at first lived with his family in the Leechgasse and then from 1928 in the Schumanngasse 27 district Leonhard nearest the Great Cavalry Barracks in Graz.

On February 21 of 1956, he died on a bus ride near Arnfels, in Leibnitz District, southern Styria.

== Anecdotes ==
- In December 1914, captain Bregant personally took over the investigations in the field.

I rode my full breed "Viribus Unitis", winner in 27 races. It was an indescribably precious feeling for me to know that I was sitting on the fastest horses of the entire theater of war. I had the sure guarantee that even a whole squadron would not have been able to catch me.

- September 1915 : Captain Bregant experienced an unpleasant adventure during a trip to Trieste. In the pitch-dark night - Trieste was completely obscured due to air raids - he fell into a deep channel with high seawalls, from which he could not free himself. A random passerby out walking got help from a nearby guest house; and with tied together tablecloths he succeeded in freeing the deathly exhausted Bregant from his awkward position.

== Awards ==
Highly decorated with the Military Merit Cross (Austria-Hungary) of the Empire of Austria II. and III. Class (first promotion was on January 26, 1915) with war decoration and swords and the Bronze and Silver Military Merit Medal on the band as well as the Karl Troop Cross Bregant returned home from the war. In the first Republic he was awarded with the commemorative medal with golden swords for World War I participants as well as the silver medal for Services and the Knight's Cross of the First Austrian Republic.
