= Sveti Vid, Cerknica =

Sveti Vid Žilce (1955–1991)
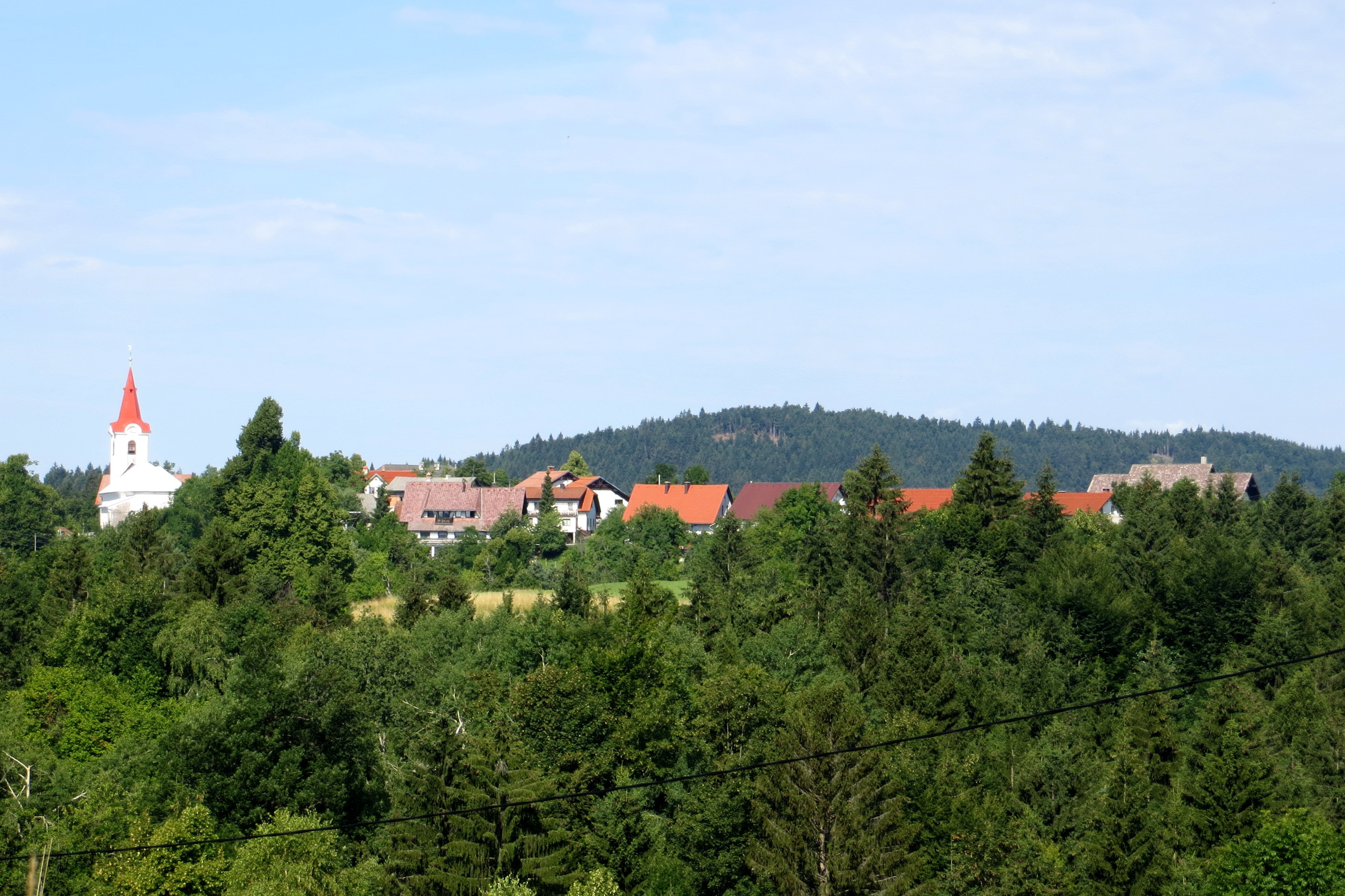

- Location in Slovenia
- Coordinates: 45°51′2.9″N 14°27′37.72″E
- Country: Slovenia
- Traditional region: Inner Carniola
- Statistical region: Littoral–Inner Carniola
- Municipality: Cerknica

Area
  - Total: 1.47 km^{2} (0.57 sq mi)
- Elevation: 844.4 m (2,770 ft)

Population (2020)
  - Total: 46
  - Density: 31/km^{2} (81/sq mi)

Sveti Vid (pronounced [ˈsʋeːti ˈʋiːt]; in older sources also Žilče pri svetem Vidu, German: Schilze bei Sankt Veit or Schülze) is a small village in the hills northeast of Begunje in the Municipality of Cerknica in the Inner Carniola region of Slovenia.

== Name ==
Under Austria-Hungary, the settlement was officially known as Žilče pri svetem Vidu (German: Schilze bei Sankt Veit), but in the Kingdom of Yugoslavia it was known as Sveti Vid (literally, 'Saint Vitus') and the name Žilče was used for a hamlet of the settlement. The name of the settlement was changed from Sveti Vid nad Cerknico (literally, 'Saint Vitus above Cerknica') to Žilce in 1955. The name was changed on the basis of the 1948 Law on Names of Settlements and Designations of Squares, Streets, and Buildings as part of efforts by Slovenia's postwar communist government to remove religious elements from toponyms. The name was changed back to Sveti Vid in 1991.

== Church ==
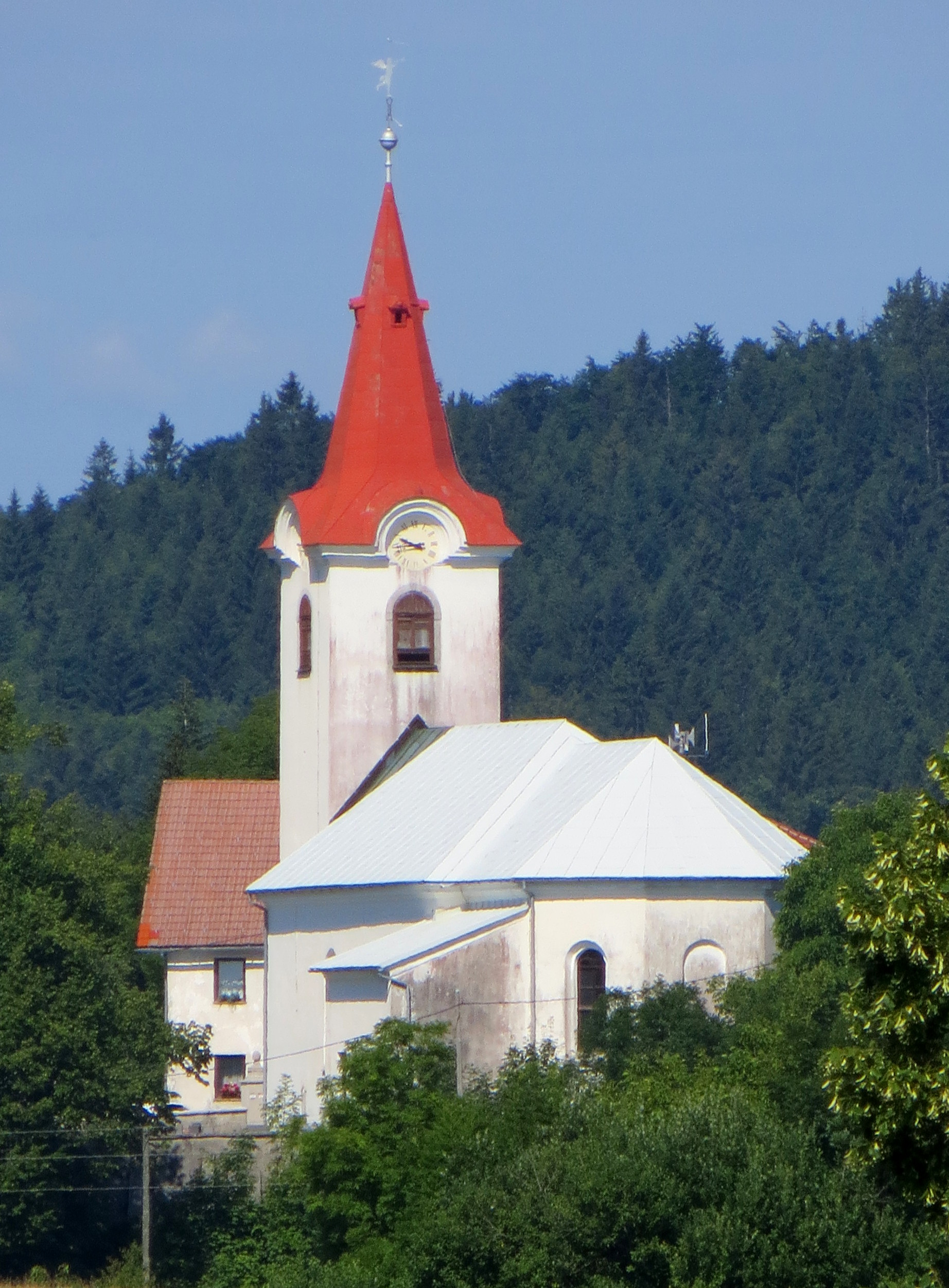
View from the east

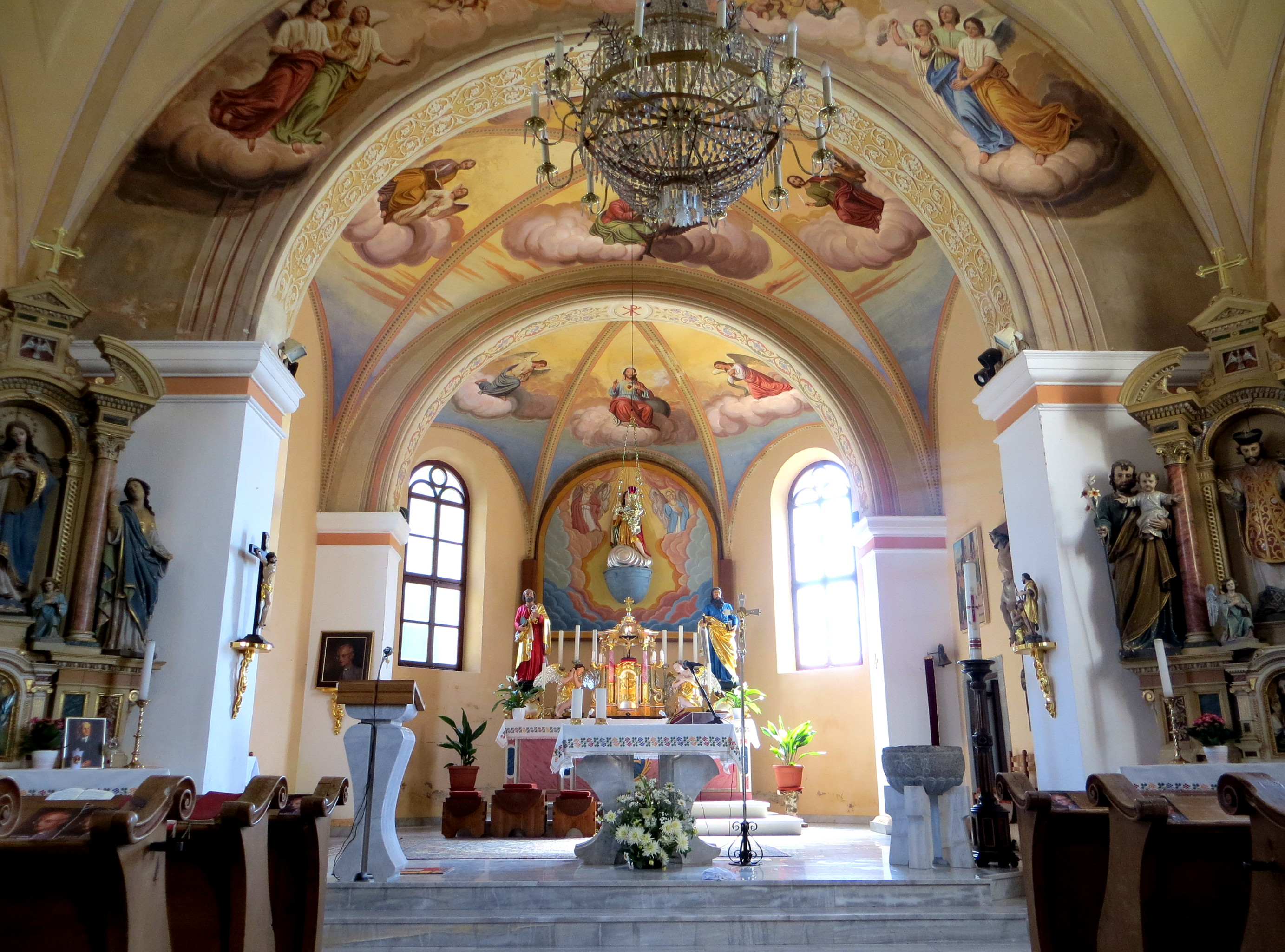
Church interior

Saint Vitus's Church

The local parish church, from which the settlement gets its name, is dedicated to Saint Vitus and belongs to the Roman Catholic Archdiocese of Ljubljana.
