= Municipality of Muta =

Municipality of Slovenia

Municipality of Muta Občina Muta
- Municipality
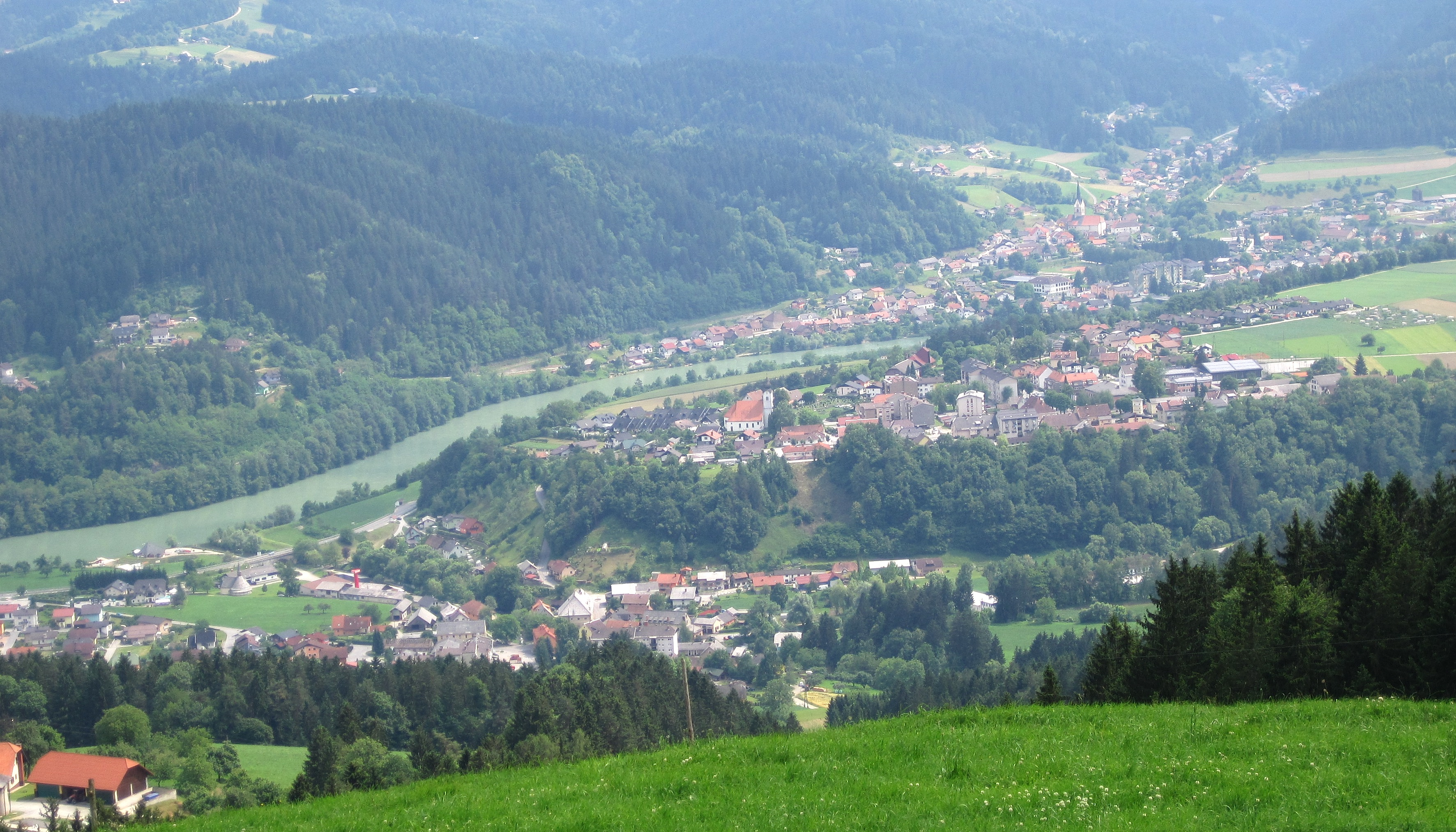

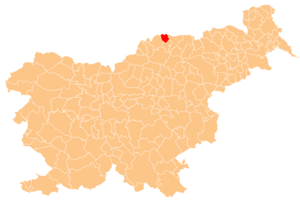
- Location of the Municipality of Muta in Slovenia
- Coordinates: 46°37′N 15°10′E

Government
  - Mayor: Angelca Mrak (Independent)

Area
  - Total: 38.8 km^{2} (15.0 sq mi)

Population (2002)
  - Total: 3,640
  - Density: 93.8/km^{2} (243/sq mi)
- Time zone: UTC+01 (CET)
  - Summer (DST): UTC+02 (CEST)
- Website: www.muta.si
- Source: Statistical Office of the Republic of Slovenia, census of 2002.

The Municipality of Muta (pronounced [ˈmuːta]; Slovene: Občina Muta) is a municipality in northern Slovenia. The seat of the municipality is the town of Muta. It borders Austria.

== Settlements ==
In addition to the municipal seat of Muta, the municipality also includes the following settlements:

- Gortina
- Mlake
- Pernice
- Sveti Jernej nad Muto
- Sveti Primož nad Muto
