= Mislinjska Dobrava =

Mislinjska Dobrava Dobrava (until 1953)
- Location in Slovenia
- Coordinates: 46°27′16.03″N 15°8′33.66″E
- Country: Slovenia
- Traditional region: Styria
- Statistical region: Carinthia
- Municipality: Slovenj Gradec

Area
  - Total: 6.967 km^{2} (2.690 sq mi)
- Elevation: 522.2 m (1,713 ft)

Population (2026)
  - Total: 751
  - Density: 108/km^{2} (280/sq mi)

Mislinjska Dobrava (pronounced [miˈsliːnska ˈdoːbɾaʋa]) is a settlement in the City Municipality of Slovenj Gradec in northern Slovenia. It lies in the Mislinja Valley southeast of the town of Slovenj Gradec. The area is part of the traditional region of Styria. The entire municipality is now included in the Carinthia Statistical Region. In January 2026, the population was 751.

== Name ==
The name of the settlement was changed from Dobrava to Mislinjska Dobrava in 1953.

== Mass grave ==
Mislinjska Dobrava is the site of a mass grave from the end of the Second World War. The Mislinjska Dobrava Mass Grave (Slovene: Grobišče Mislinjska Dobrava) is located in a small woods in the middle of the settlement, 100 meters (330 ft) from the road from Mislinja to Slovenj Gradec. It contains the remains of Croatian soldiers or Cossacks killed in May 1945.

== Cultural heritage ==
Remains of the Roman road from Celea to Virunum, which ran through the Mislinja Valley, have been identified near the settlement.

== Airport ==
Slovenj Gradec Airport is a small airport located in the northern part of Mislinjska Dobrava.
