= Sveti Jernej =

Sveti Jernej may refer to several places in Slovenia:

- Seča, a settlement in the Municipality of Piran (known as Sveti Jernej until 1958)
- Sveti Jernej, Slovenske Konjice, a settlement in the Municipality of Slovenske Konjice
- Sveti Jernej nad Muto, a settlement in the Municipality of Muta
- Sveti Jernej pri Ločah, the name of Sveti Jernej in the Municipality of Slovenske Konjice until 1955
