= Archaeological Society of Slovenia =

Non-governmental organization

The Archaeological Society of Slovenia is a non-governmental organization that unites Slovene archaeologists on a voluntary basis. The society organises presentations of new archaeological research, lectures and study trips, and publishes the Slovene Archaeology Society Bulletin, as well as Arheo Journal. Its members participate in international conferences and symposia. Every year the Award of the Archaeological Society of Slovenia is bestowed to individuals for professional achievements.

== Mission ==
The society plays an important role in presenting actual issues to the public. Recently the archaeologists have been facing lack of storage places due to 50 to 100 archaeological sites researched every year, mainly on highway construction. Several tons of archaeological finds are excavated every year.

There are a few archaeological parks in Slovenia, such as Most na Soči, Roman Emona, the Church of St George in Legen near Slovenj Gradec, Šempeter Necropolis, Rifnik Archaeological Site near Celje, and Vranje near Sevnica. Most Slovene regional museums also have a permanent archaeological exhibition.

== Recognitions ==
The society's award and related recognitions have been granted yearly since 1996. The award is given for lifetime achievement and for outstanding contributions to archaeology. The society also recognises the important achievements in the field of archaeology in the previous year and commemorates merited individuals by giving them honorary and worthy membership.

Previous award winners have been Janez Dular (2013), Irena Šavel (2009), Biba Teržan (2008), Mitja Guštin (2007), Mira Strmčnik Gulič (2006), Marijan Slabe (2003), Ivan Turk (2002), Nada Osmuk (2001), Ljudmila Plesničar Gec (2000), Iva Mikl Curk (1999), Paola Korošec (1998), and Stanko Pahič (1998).
