= Legen =

- Location in Slovenia
- Coordinates: 46°30′14.29″N 15°6′51.88″E
- Country: Slovenia
- Traditional region: Styria
- Statistical region: Carinthia
- Municipality: Slovenj Gradec

Area
  - Total: 18.382 km^{2} (7.097 sq mi)
- Elevation: 488 m (1,601 ft)

Population (2026)
  - Total: 1,133
  - Density: 62/km^{2} (160/sq mi)

Legen (pronounced [ˈleːɡən]) is a settlement in the City Municipality of Slovenj Gradec in northern Slovenia. It lies in the valley of Barbara Creek (Slovene: Barbarski potok) and the surrounding Pohorje Hills east of Slovenj Gradec. The area is part of the traditional region of Styria. The entire municipality is now included in the Carinthia Statistical Region. In January 2026, the population was 1,133.

== Churches ==
Two churches in the settlement are dedicated to Saint George and Saint Barbara and belong to the Parish of Šmartno pri Slovenj Gradcu. The former was built in the late 13th century on the site of an earlier Romanesque building and the latter dates to the early 16th century.
