= Golavabuka =

- Location in Slovenia
- Coordinates: 46°29′25.78″N 15°10′9.2″E
- Country: Slovenia
- Traditional region: Styria
- Statistical region: Carinthia
- Municipality: Slovenj Gradec

Area
  - Total: 9.354 km^{2} (3.612 sq mi)
- Elevation: 1,079.7 m (3,542 ft)

Population (2026)
  - Total: 190
  - Density: 20/km^{2} (52/sq mi)

Golavabuka (pronounced [ɡɔlaʋaˈbuːka]) is a settlement in the City Municipality of Slovenj Gradec in northern Slovenia. The area is part of the traditional region of Styria. The entire municipality is now included in the Carinthia Statistical Region. In January 2026, the population was 190.

The local churches is dedicated to Saints Phillip and James and belong to the Parish of Šmartno pri Slovenj Gradcu. It was a Romanesque building that was rebuilt in the 16th century.
