= Gradišče, Slovenj Gradec =

Gradišče
- Location in Slovenia
- Coordinates: 46°31′10.64″N 15°6′55.75″E
- Country: Slovenia
- Traditional region: Styria
- Statistical region: Carinthia
- Municipality: Slovenj Gradec

Area
  - Total: 5.5 km^{2} (2.1 sq mi)
- Elevation: 676.5 m (2,219 ft)

Population (2002)
  - Total: 310

Gradišče (pronounced [ɡɾaˈdiːʃtʃɛ]) is a settlement in the City Municipality of Slovenj Gradec in northern Slovenia. The area is part of the traditional region of Styria. The entire municipality is now included in the Carinthia Statistical Region.

== Mass graves ==
Gradišče is the site of two known mass graves from the period immediately after the Second World War. Both graves are located in the western part of the settlement, in the northern outskirts of Slovenj Gradec, and contain the remains of Croatians that were traveling toward the Austrian border and killed between 10 and 15 May 1945. The Troblje Mass Grave (Slovene: Grobišče Troblje) is located on the east side of the road to Dravograd, near a shrine next to a ditch with a creek that flows into the Mislinja River. It is a former antitank trench that contains the remains of an unknown number victims. The Tretjak Farm Mass Grave (Grobišče na domačiji Tretjak) is located on the Tretjak farm at Gradišče no. 6. It contains the remains of 12 victims.
