= Brda, Slovenj Gradec =

Brda
- Location in Slovenia
- Coordinates: 46°28′18.53″N 15°8′38.52″E
- Country: Slovenia
- Traditional region: Styria
- Statistical region: Carinthia
- Municipality: Slovenj Gradec

Area
  - Total: 4.094 km^{2} (1.581 sq mi)
- Elevation: 562 m (1,844 ft)

Population (2026)
  - Total: 295
  - Density: 72/km^{2} (190/sq mi)

Brda (pronounced [ˈbəɾda], in older sources Brde, German: Werde) is a settlement in the City Municipality of Slovenj Gradec in northern Slovenia. The area is part of the traditional region of Styria. The entire municipality is now included in the Carinthia Statistical Region. In January 2026, the population was 295.

Two churches in the settlement are dedicated to Saint Andrew and Mary Magdalene and belong to the Parish of Šmartno pri Slovenj Gradcu. The former dates to the late 15th century and the latter was built in the 16th century on the site of a Romanesque building.
