= Graška Gora =

- Location in Slovenia
- Coordinates: 46°25′57.43″N 15°6′59.3″E
- Country: Slovenia
- Traditional region: Styria
- Statistical region: Carinthia
- Municipality: Slovenj Gradec

Area
  - Total: 4.247 km^{2} (1.640 sq mi)
- Elevation: 667.5 m (2,190 ft)

Population (2026)
  - Total: 109
  - Density: 26/km^{2} (67/sq mi)

Graška Gora (pronounced [ˈɡɾaːʃka ˈɡɔːɾa]; German: Grazerberg) is a dispersed settlement in the City Municipality of Slovenj Gradec in northern Slovenia. The area is part of the traditional region of Styria. The entire municipality is now included in the Carinthia Statistical Region. In January 2026, the population was 109.

The local church north of the settlement, in the territory of the neighbouring settlement of Šmiklavž, is dedicated to Saint Helena and belongs to the Parish of Šmiklavž. The earliest phases of the building date to the 13th century.
