= Tomaška Vas =

- Location in Slovenia
- Coordinates: 46°26′58.96″N 15°7′9.27″E
- Country: Slovenia
- Traditional region: Styria
- Statistical region: Carinthia
- Municipality: Slovenj Gradec

Area
  - Total: 0.455 km^{2} (0.176 sq mi)
- Elevation: 463.5 m (1,521 ft)

Population (2026)
  - Total: 122
  - Density: 268/km^{2} (690/sq mi)

Tomaška Vas (pronounced [tɔˈmaːʃka ˈʋaːs]; Slovene: Tomaška vas) is a settlement in the City Municipality of Slovenj Gradec in northern Slovenia. The area is part of the traditional region of Styria. The entire municipality is now included in the Carinthia Statistical Region. In January 2026, the population was 122.

The local church from which the settlement gets its name is dedicated to Saint Thomas and belongs to the Parish of Šmartno pri Slovenj Gradcu. It was first mentioned in documents dating to 1375.
