= Troblje =

- Location in Slovenia
- Coordinates: 46°31′30.8″N 15°5′24.3″E
- Country: Slovenia
- Traditional region: Styria
- Statistical region: Carinthia
- Municipality: Slovenj Gradec

Area
  - Total: 3.800 km^{2} (1.467 sq mi)
- Elevation: 428.6 m (1,406 ft)

Population (2026)
  - Total: 320
  - Density: 84/km^{2} (220/sq mi)

Troblje (pronounced [ˈtɾoːbljɛ]) is a settlement in the City Municipality of Slovenj Gradec in northern Slovenia. The area is part of the traditional region of Styria. The entire municipality is now included in the Carinthia Statistical Region. In January 2026, the population was 320.

The church in the settlement is dedicated to the Assumption of Mary and belongs to the Parish of Pameče. It was built in 1762.
