= Vrhe, Slovenj Gradec =

Vrhe
- Location in Slovenia
- Coordinates: 46°31′29.63″N 15°1′32.96″E
- Country: Slovenia
- Traditional region: Styria
- Statistical region: Carinthia
- Municipality: Slovenj Gradec

Area
  - Total: 8.892 km^{2} (3.433 sq mi)
- Elevation: 534.5 m (1,754 ft)

Population (2026)
  - Total: 308
  - Density: 35/km^{2} (91/sq mi)

Vrhe (pronounced [ˈʋəɾxɛ]) is a settlement in the City Municipality of Slovenj Gradec in northern Slovenia. The area is part of the traditional region of Styria. The entire municipality is now included in the Carinthia Statistical Region. In January 2026, the population was 308.

There are two churches in the settlement. The church dedicated to Saint Agnes belongs to the Parish of Sele. It dates to the second half of the 14th century. A second church in the northern part of the settlement is dedicated to Saint Urban and was built around 1500.
