= Gortina =

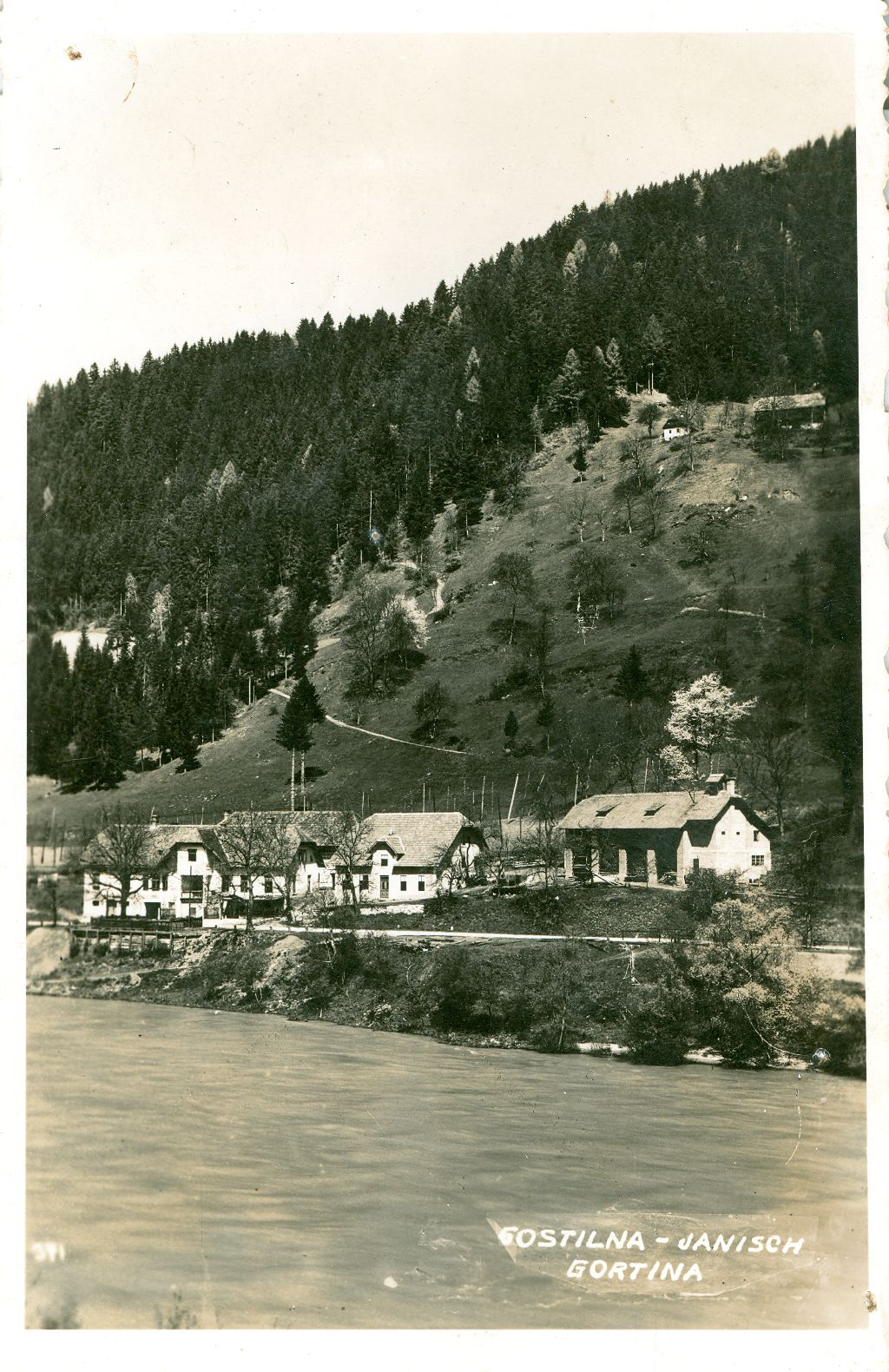
- 1935 postcard of Gortina

- Location in Slovenia
- Coordinates: 46°36′18.94″N 15°7′28.85″E
- Country: Slovenia
- Traditional region: Styria
- Statistical region: Carinthia
- Municipality: Muta

Area
  - Total: 6.88 km^{2} (2.66 sq mi)
- Elevation: 367.4 m (1,205 ft)

Population (2002)
  - Total: 563

Gortina (pronounced [ɡɔɾˈtiːna]) is a village on the left bank of the Drava River in the Municipality of Muta in the historical Styria region in northern Slovenia.

There is a small church in the settlement with a wooden belfry. It is dedicated to Saint Stephen and was built in the early 18th century. It belongs to the Parish of Muta.
