= Pernice, Muta =

Pernice
- Location in Slovenia
- Coordinates: 46°38′3.55″N 15°7′32.85″E
- Country: Slovenia
- Traditional region: Styria
- Statistical region: Carinthia
- Municipality: Muta

Area
  - Total: 8.01 km^{2} (3.09 sq mi)
- Elevation: 542.6 m (1,780 ft)

Population (2002)
  - Total: 156

Pernice (pronounced [pɛɾˈniːtsɛ]) is a dispersed settlement in the hills northwest of Muta in the historical Styria region in northern Slovenia, right on the border with Austria.

The local parish church is dedicated to Saint Simon and Saint Jude and was first mentioned in documents dating to 1468. It was destroyed during Ottoman raids in 1494 and was rebuilt in 1510. It belongs to the Roman Catholic Archdiocese of Maribor.
