= Sveti Primož nad Muto =

Sveti Primož nad Muto Podlipje (1955–1994)
- Location in Slovenia
- Coordinates: 46°37′37.48″N 15°9′43.49″E
- Country: Slovenia
- Traditional region: Styria
- Statistical region: Carinthia
- Municipality: Muta

Area
  - Total: 8.28 km^{2} (3.20 sq mi)
- Elevation: 651.1 m (2,136 ft)

Population (2002)
  - Total: 304

Sveti Primož nad Muto (pronounced [ˈsʋeːti ˈpɾiːmɔʃ nad ˈmuːtɔ]) is a dispersed settlement in the hills immediately north of Muta in the historical Styria region in northern Slovenia.

== Name ==
The name of the settlement was changed from Sveti Primož nad Muto (literally, 'Saint Primus above Muta') to Podlipje (literally, 'below the linden trees') in 1955. The name was changed on the basis of the 1948 Law on Names of Settlements and Designations of Squares, Streets, and Buildings as part of efforts by Slovenia's postwar communist government to remove religious elements from toponyms. The name Sveti Primož nad Muto was restored in 1994.

== Church ==
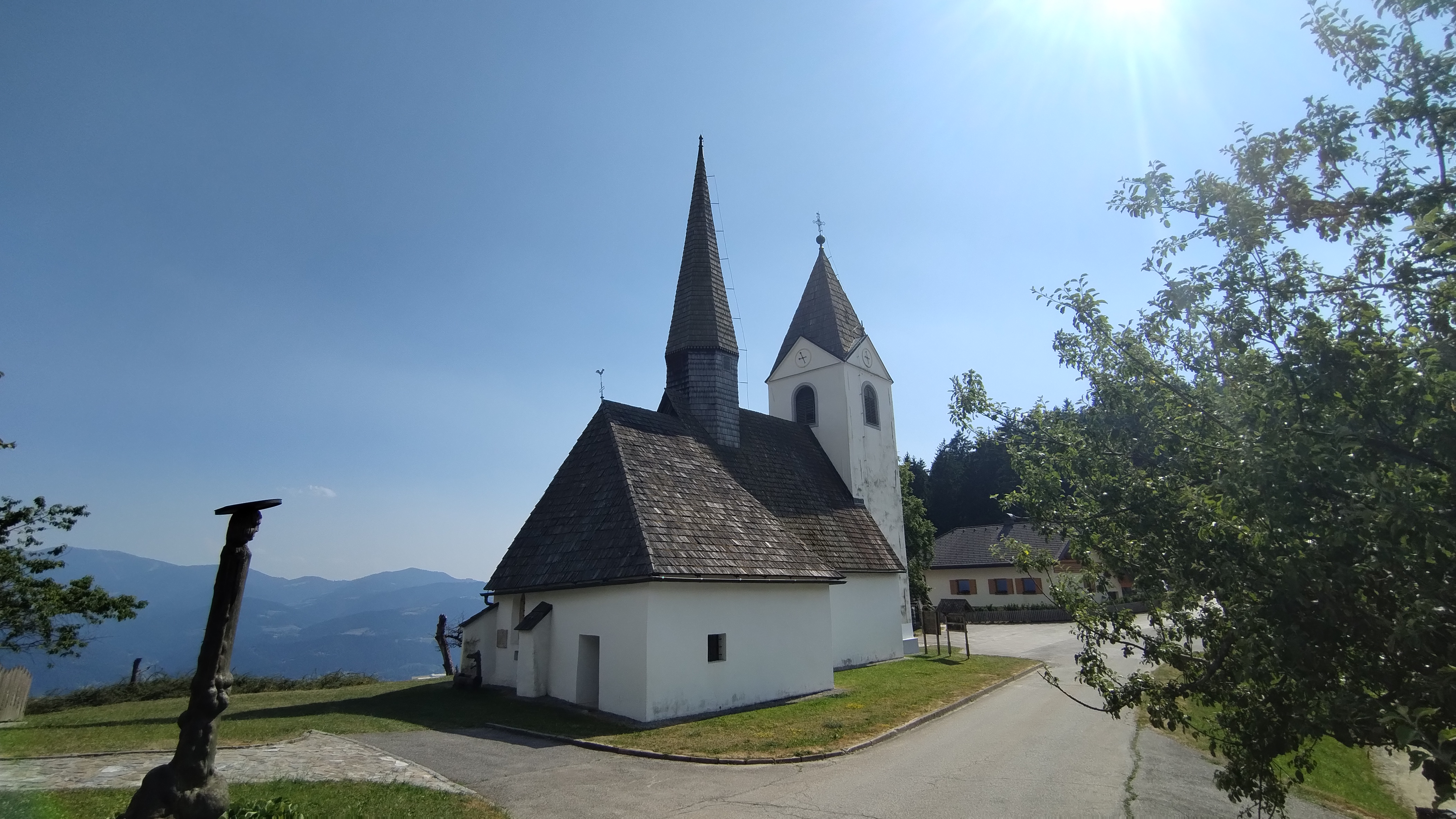
Church of Sveti Primož nad Muto

The local church from which the settlement gets its name is dedicated to Saints Primus and Felician and was first mentioned in written documents dating to 1425. The nave is Romanesque with a Gothic sanctuary and a 19th-century belfry. The east tower was added in 1909. The church belongs to the Parish of Muta.
