= Turiška Vas, Slovenj Gradec =

Turiška Vas
- Location in Slovenia
- Coordinates: 46°28′24.1″N 15°7′49.78″E
- Country: Slovenia
- Traditional region: Styria
- Statistical region: Carinthia
- Municipality: Slovenj Gradec

Area
  - Total: 0.696 km^{2} (0.269 sq mi)
- Elevation: 473.1 m (1,552 ft)

Population (2026)
  - Total: 142
  - Density: 204/km^{2} (530/sq mi)

Turiška Vas (pronounced [tuˈɾiːʃka ˈʋáːs]) is a small village in the Mislinja Valley in the City Municipality of Slovenj Gradec in northern Slovenia. The area is part of the traditional region of Styria. The entire municipality is now included in the Carinthia Statistical Region. In January 2026, the population was 142.

== Notable people ==
Notable people that were born or lived in Turiška Vas include the following:

- Jerica Mrzel (born 1945), actress, singer, and politician
