= Zgornji Razbor =

- Location in Slovenia
- Coordinates: 46°28′5.91″N 14°59′19.26″E
- Country: Slovenia
- Traditional region: Styria
- Statistical region: Carinthia
- Municipality: Slovenj Gradec

Area
  - Total: 17.985 km^{2} (6.944 sq mi)
- Elevation: 910.2 m (2,986 ft)

Population (2026)
  - Total: 113
  - Density: 6/km^{2} (16/sq mi)

Zgornji Razbor (pronounced [ˈzɡoːɾnji ˈɾaːzbɔɾ], German: Oberrasswald) is a settlement in the City Municipality of Slovenj Gradec in northern Slovenia. The area is part of the traditional region of Styria. The entire municipality is now included in the Carinthia Statistical Region. In January 2026, the population was 133.

The parish church in the settlement is dedicated to the Prophet Daniel and belongs to the Roman Catholic Archdiocese of Maribor. It dates to the late 16th century.
