= Spodnji Razbor =

- Location in Slovenia
- Coordinates: 46°26′45.23″N 15°2′44.97″E
- Country: Slovenia
- Traditional region: Styria
- Statistical region: Carinthia
- Municipality: Slovenj Gradec

Area
  - Total: 10.434 km^{2} (4.029 sq mi)
- Elevation: 819.3 m (2,688 ft)

Population (2026)
  - Total: 180
  - Density: 17/km^{2} (44/sq mi)

Spodnji Razbor (pronounced [ˈspoːdnji ˈɾaːzbɔɾ], German: Unterrasswald) is a dispersed settlement in the City Municipality of Slovenj Gradec in northern Slovenia. The area is part of the traditional region of Styria. The entire municipality is now included in the Carinthia Statistical Region. In January 2026, the population was 180.
