= Podgorje, Slovenj Gradec =

Podgorje
- Village
- Location in Slovenia
- Coordinates: 46°28′4.81″N 15°5′23.95″E
- Country: Slovenia
- Traditional region: Styria
- Statistical region: Carinthia
- Municipality: Slovenj Gradec

Area
  - Total: 18.726 km^{2} (7.230 sq mi)
- Elevation: 444.6 m (1,459 ft)

Population (2026)
  - Total: 1,019
  - Density: 54/km^{2} (140/sq mi)

Podgorje (pronounced [ˈpoːdɡɔɾjɛ]) is a settlement in the City Municipality of Slovenj Gradec in northern Slovenia. The area is part of the traditional region of Styria. The entire municipality is now included in the Carinthia Statistical Region. In January 2026, the population was 1,019.

The parish church in the settlement is dedicated to Saint Ulrich (Slovene: sveti Urh) and belongs to the Roman Catholic Archdiocese of Maribor. It dates to the late 15th century. A second church built on a hill west of the settlement is dedicated to the Holy Spirit (Slovene: Sveti Duh) and was built in 1459.
