= Vodriž =

- Location in Slovenia
- Coordinates: 46°27′9.04″N 15°6′36.02″E
- Country: Slovenia
- Traditional region: Styria
- Statistical region: Carinthia
- Municipality: Slovenj Gradec

Area
  - Total: 3.612 km^{2} (1.395 sq mi)
- Elevation: 470.5 m (1,544 ft)

Population (2026)
  - Total: 95
  - Density: 26/km^{2} (67/sq mi)

Vodriž (pronounced [ʋɔˈdɾiːʃ]) is a settlement in the City Municipality of Slovenj Gradec in northern Slovenia. The area is part of the traditional region of Styria. The entire municipality is now included in the Carinthia Statistical Region. In January 2026, the population was 95.

On a hill above the settlement to the west, the ruins of a 13th-century castle can still be seen.
