= Mlake, Muta =

Mlake
- Location in Slovenia
- Coordinates: 46°38′59.37″N 15°5′35.4″E
- Country: Slovenia
- Traditional region: Styria
- Statistical region: Carinthia
- Municipality: Muta

Area
  - Total: 3.2 km^{2} (1.2 sq mi)
- Elevation: 943.9 m (3,097 ft)

Population (2002)
  - Total: 43

Mlake (pronounced [ˈmlaːkɛ]) is a small dispersed settlement in the hills northwest of Muta in the historical Styria region in northern Slovenia, right on the border with Austria.
