= Stari Trg, Slovenj Gradec =

Stari Trg
- Location in Slovenia
- Coordinates: 46°30′37.11″N 15°3′35.37″E
- Country: Slovenia
- Traditional region: Styria
- Statistical region: Carinthia
- Municipality: Slovenj Gradec

Area
  - Total: 4.740 km^{2} (1.830 sq mi)
- Elevation: 819.3 m (2,688 ft)

Population (2026)
  - Total: 665
  - Density: 140/km^{2} (360/sq mi)

Stari Trg (pronounced [ˈstaːɾi ˈtəɾk]; Slovene: Stari trg, German: Altenmarkt) is a settlement in the City Municipality of Slovenj Gradec in northern Slovenia. The area is part of the traditional region of Styria. The entire municipality is now included in the Carinthia Statistical Region. In January 2026, the population was 665.

== Mass graves ==
Stari Trg is the site of two known mass graves from the period immediately after the Second World War. Both are located north of the settlement, on the western outskirts of Slovenj Gradec, and contain the remains of Croatians killed between May 10 and 15, 1945 while traveling toward the Austrian border. The Gmajna Tree Nursery Mass Grave (Slovene: Grobišče v drevesnici na Gmajni) is located in a meadow between a plantation of trees to the south and a ditch to the north, near an electric pole. It contains the remains of three victims. The Nova Oprema Woods Mass Grave (Grobišče v gozdu za Novo opremo) is located on a wooded slope behind the Nova O upholstered furniture factory (formerly known as Nova Oprema). It contains the remains of 20 victims.

== Church ==
The parish church in the settlement is dedicated to Saint Radegund and belongs to the Roman Catholic Archdiocese of Maribor. It dates to the late 15th century.
