= International Association of Peace Messenger Cities =

The International Association of Peace Messenger Cities (IAMPC) is a United Nations organization of cities around the world that have volunteered to promote peace and understanding between nations.

The movement began in the International Year of Peace, 1986. During the period 1987–1991, 74 cities were chosen from among thousands and appointed as messengers of peace by the UN Secretary-General Javier Perez DeCuellar. Representatives of 63 cities met on 7 and 8 September 1988 in Verdun, France, to participate "in the building of a world less violent and more humane, a world of tolerance and of mutual respect to enable the requirements of peace based on justice and human rights to be better understood."

The IAMPC was established in 1988 and now administers the programme according to the statute of the association and criteria for membership. The association was established to recognize and encourage the role and responsibility cities have in creating a culture of peace. It was formalized at a General Assembly meeting in New Haven, Connecticut, USA, in 1990. Their first statute was adopted in Marrakesh, Morocco, in 1991. The organization was born out of a United Nations General Assembly designation as peace messengers based on the idea that municipal authorities have profound responsibility to assume an active, creative role in establishing a culture of peace within their borders. Member cities of the association meet twice a year with the aim of exchanging programmes, ideas and experience in cities around the globe. The IAPMC has been extensively involved in numerous peace campaigns, banning of anti-personnel landmines campaign, nuclear non-proliferation, human rights, and has attracted substantial public awareness in peacemaking efforts of the United Nations Organization, Economic and Social Council, Department of Public Information and other bodies. The participation at the international conferences throughout the years of IAPMC activities has been notable at prominent events such as World Social Forum, First World Conference on City Diplomacy (The Hague, 2008) etc. It has been one of the sponsors and co-organizers of Haifa International Conference for a WMD-Free Middle East in 2013. The organization is also a member of Abolition 2000 and cooperates well with similar organizations, such as Mayors for Peace.

== Representatives ==
President: Victor Hadjiavraam, Mayor of Morphou (Cyprus)

Vice Presidents: Andrzej Pietrasik, Mayor of Plonsk (Poland), Vincent N'cho, Vice-Governor of Abidjan District (Ivory Coast)

Secretary-General: Andrej Čas, Mayor of Slovenj Gradec (Slovenia)

Deputy Secretary-General: Dušan Stojanovič, Slovenj Gradec (Slovenia)

UN Representative: Sylvester E. Rowe (New York)

== Honorary members ==
Alfred L. Marder, Honorary President, New Haven (US)

Andre Hediger, Geneva (Switzerland)

Brian Fitch, Brighton & Hove (UK)

Sylvester E. Rowe, New York (US)

== Executive board ==
The following member cities are members of the executive board of IAPMC:

- Abidjan (Ivory Coast)
- Kragujevac (Serbia)
- Kumanovo (FYR Macedonia)
- Morphou (Cyprus)
- Orestiada (Greece)
- Płońsk (Poland)
- Sarajevo (Bosnia & Herzegovina)
- Slovenj Gradec (Slovenia)
- Volgograd (Russia)
- Zurrieq (Malta)

== General assemblies ==
- 1988 – Verdun, France
- 1989 – Warsaw, Poland
- 1990 – New Haven, United States
- 1991 – Yokohama, Japan
- 1992 – Marrakesh, Morocco
- 1993 – Geneva, Switzerland
- 1994 – Arnhem, The Netherlands
- 1995 – Lisbon, Portugal
- 1996 – Bologna, Italy
- 1997 – Abidjan, Ivory Coast
- 1998 – Pori, Finland
- 1999 – Kruševac, Serbia
- 2000 – Oswiecim, Poland
- 2001 – Yokohama, Japan
- 2004 – New Haven, United States
- 2005 – Slovenj Gradec, Slovenia
- 2006 – Vancouver, Canada
- 2007 – Kruševac, Serbia
- 2008 – Sochi, Russia
- 2009 – Sarajevo, Bosnia And Herzegovina
- 2010 – Limassol (Morphou), Cyprus
- 2011 – Kragujevac, Serbia
- 2012 – Slovenj Gradec, Slovenia
- 2013 – Missolonghi, Greece
- 2014 – Kalavryta, Greece
- 2015 – Kumanovo, North Macedonia
- 2016 – Wielun, Poland
- 2017 – Orestiada, Greece

== Member cities ==
New member cities can apply for membership, providing they fulfill and comply with the membership criteria, either by contacting the officials (president or secretary-general) or any of the member cities which can propose the new member city at the General Assembly.

As of 2023, the 115 member cities are:

=== Joined in 1987 ===
- Abidjan
- Arnhem
- Assisi
- Atlanta
- Bangui
- Beijing
- Brighton and Hove
- Buenos Aires
- Chicago
- Como
- Concord
- Dakar
- Delphi
- Dhaka
- Florence
- Geneva
- Hammam-Lif
- Helsinki
- Hiroshima
- L'Hospitalet de Llobregat
- Kyiv
- Copenhagen
- Kragujevac
- Lima
- Lomé
- Madrid
- Maputo
- Marrakesh
- Marzabotto
- Melbourne
- Minsk
- Moscow
- Nagasaki
- New Delhi
- New Haven
- La Paz
- La Plaine-sur-Mer
- Pori
- Prague
- Ravenna
- Rijswijk
- Rome
- San Francisco
- San José
- Saint Petersburg
- Sheffield
- Sochi
- Split
- Stockholm
- Tbilisi
- Toronto
- Vancouver
- Verdun
- Vienna
- Villa El Salvador
- Volgograd
- Warsaw
- Wollongong
- Yokohama

=== Joined in 1988 ===
- Košice
- Liège
- Lisbon
- Wrocław

=== Joined in 1989 ===
- Antwerp
- Bogotá
- Tashkent
- Slovenj Gradec

=== Joined in 1990 ===
- Berlin
- Kruševac

=== Joined in 1991 ===
- Bandung
- Coventry
- Quito
- Tokyo
- Vladivostok

=== Joined in 1997 ===
- Cambridge, Massachusetts

=== Joined in 1998 ===
- Oświęcim
- Płońsk
- Lublin

=== Joined in 1999 ===
- Morphou
- Libreville

=== Joined in 2000 ===
- Suwon

=== Joined in 2001 ===
- Havana

=== Joined in 2004 ===
- Milton Keynes

=== Joined in 2005 ===
- Sarajevo
- Milan

=== Joined in 2006 ===
- Freetown
- Jeju

=== Joined in 2007 ===
- Puebla

=== Joined in 2008 ===
- Paju
- Kotor
- Kyrenia
- Wieluń

=== Joined in 2009 ===
- Barcelona
- Caracas
- Friedrichshafen
- Kumanovo
- Mexico City
- Yamoussoukro
- Ypati
- Zagreb

=== Joined in 2010 ===
- Kandanos

=== Joined in 2011 ===
- Messolonghi
- Poltava
- Torun

=== Joined in 2012 ===
- Berane

=== Joined in 2014 ===
- Kalavryta
- Ljubljana
- Orestiada
- Sparta
- Żurrieq

=== Joined in 2015 ===
- Strumica

=== Joined in 2017 ===
- Rostock

=== Joined in 2018 ===
- Lefkoniko

=== Joined in 2019 ===
- Prilep
- Sremski Karlovci

== Trivia ==
There is an annual Amateur Radio Contest focusing on the peace messenger cities.
