= Urban Municipality of Slovenj Gradec =

Urban municipality of Slovenia

Urban Municipality of Slovenj Gradec Mestna občina Slovenj Gradec
- Municipality
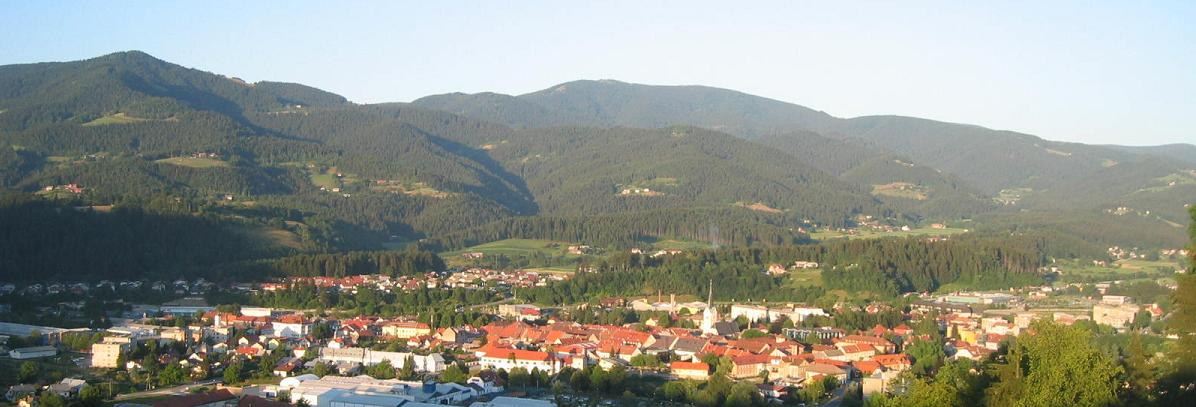

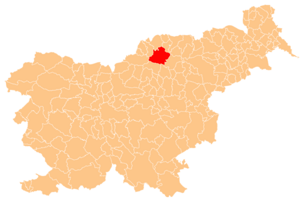
- Location of the Municipality of Slovenj Gradec in Slovenia
- Coordinates: 46°31′N 15°05′E
- Country: Slovenia

Government
  - Mayor: Tilen Klugler (SD)

Area
  - Total: 173.7 km^{2} (67.1 sq mi)

Population (2002)
  - Total: 12,779
  - Density: 73.57/km^{2} (190.5/sq mi)
- Time zone: UTC+01 (CET)
  - Summer (DST): UTC+02 (CEST)
- Postal code: 2380
- Website: www.slovenjgradec.si
- Source: Statistical Office of the Republic of Slovenia, census of 2002.

The Urban Municipality of Slovenj Gradec (pronounced [slɔˈʋeːŋ ˈɡɾaːdəts]; Slovene: Mestna občina Slovenj Gradec) is a municipality in northern Slovenia. The seat of the municipality is the town of Slovenj Gradec. It is part of the historic Styria region, and since 2005 it has belonged to the NUTS-3 Carinthia Statistical Region.

It is the smallest of the twelve urban municipalities of Slovenia.

== Settlements ==
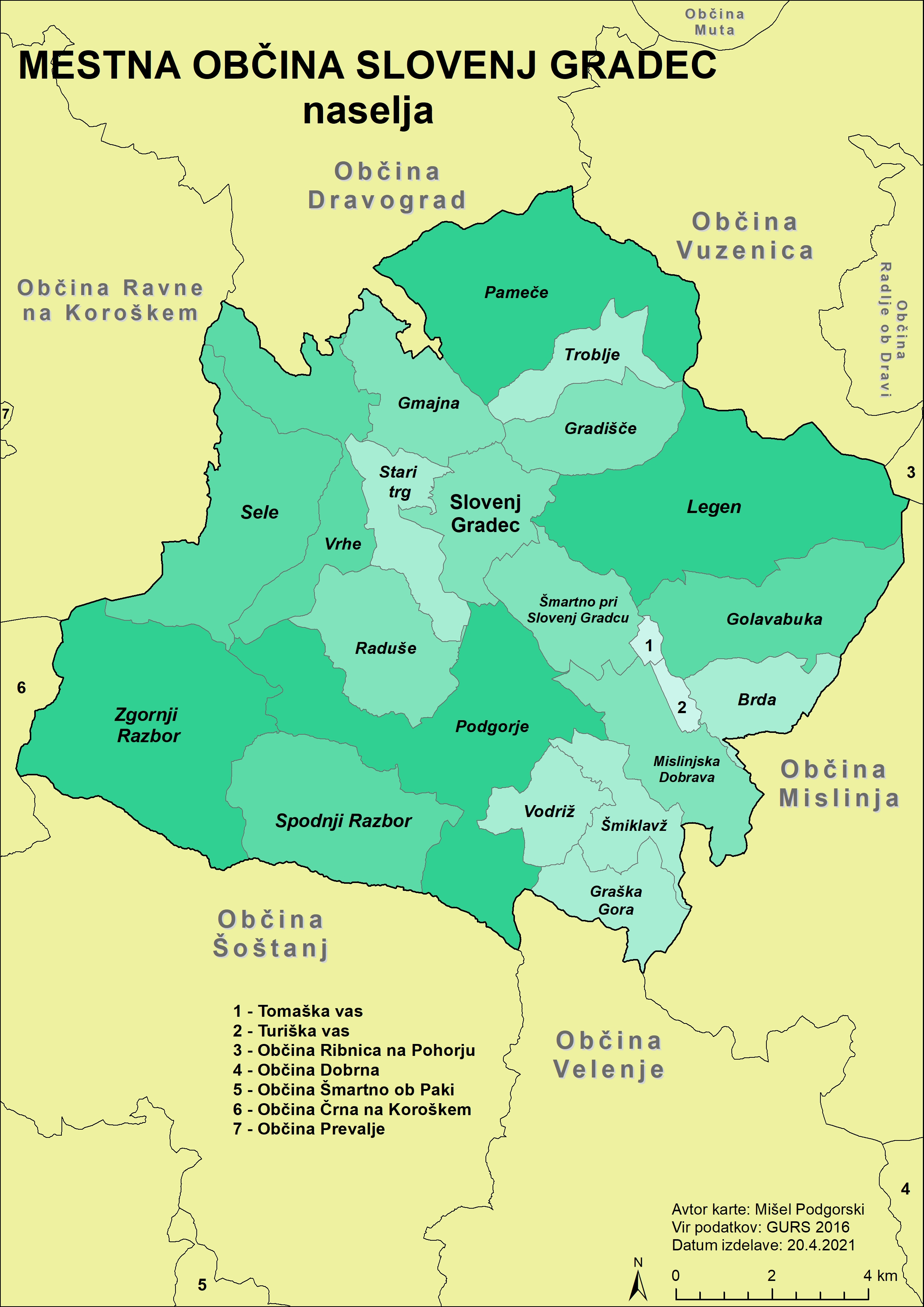
Villages in the municipality

In addition to the municipal seat of Slovenj Gradec, the municipality also includes the following settlements:

- Brda
- Gmajna
- Golavabuka
- Gradišče
- Graška Gora
- Legen
- Mislinjska Dobrava
- Pameče
- Podgorje
- Raduše
- Sele
- Šmartno pri Slovenj Gradcu
- Šmiklavž
- Spodnji Razbor
- Stari Trg
- Tomaška Vas
- Troblje
- Turiška Vas
- Vodriž
- Vrhe
- Zgornji Razbor
