= Sele, Slovenj Gradec =

Sele
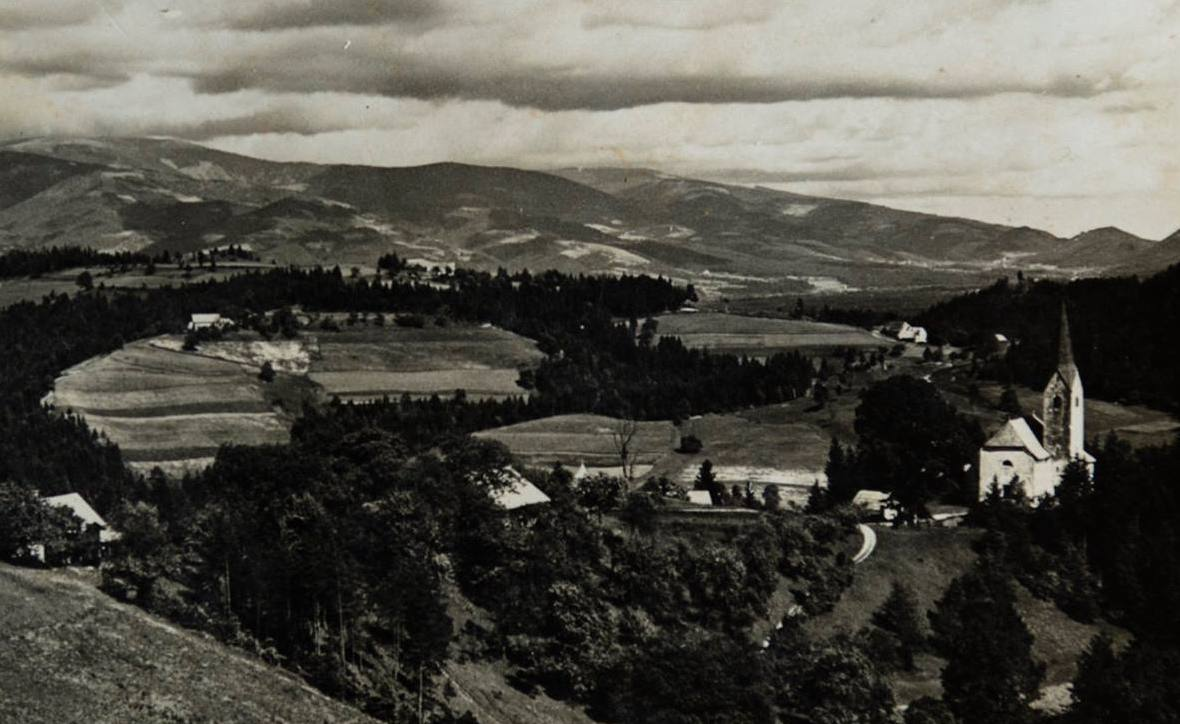

- Location in Slovenia
- Coordinates: 46°30′10.96″N 15°0′57.78″E
- Country: Slovenia
- Traditional region: Styria
- Statistical region: Carinthia
- Municipality: Slovenj Gradec

Area
  - Total: 11.420 km^{2} (4.409 sq mi)
- Elevation: 639.6 m (2,098 ft)

Population (2026)
  - Total: 236
  - Density: 21/km^{2} (54/sq mi)

Sele (pronounced [ˈseːlɛ]) is a settlement in the City Municipality of Slovenj Gradec in northern Slovenia. The area is part of the traditional region of Styria. The entire municipality is now included in the Carinthia Statistical Region. In January 2026, the population was 236.

The parish church in the settlement is dedicated to Saint Roch (Slovene: sveti Rok) and belongs to the Roman Catholic Archdiocese of Maribor. It dates to the late 15th century. A second church in the east of the settlement dedicated to Saint Nicholas and was built in the early 14th century.
