= Pameče =

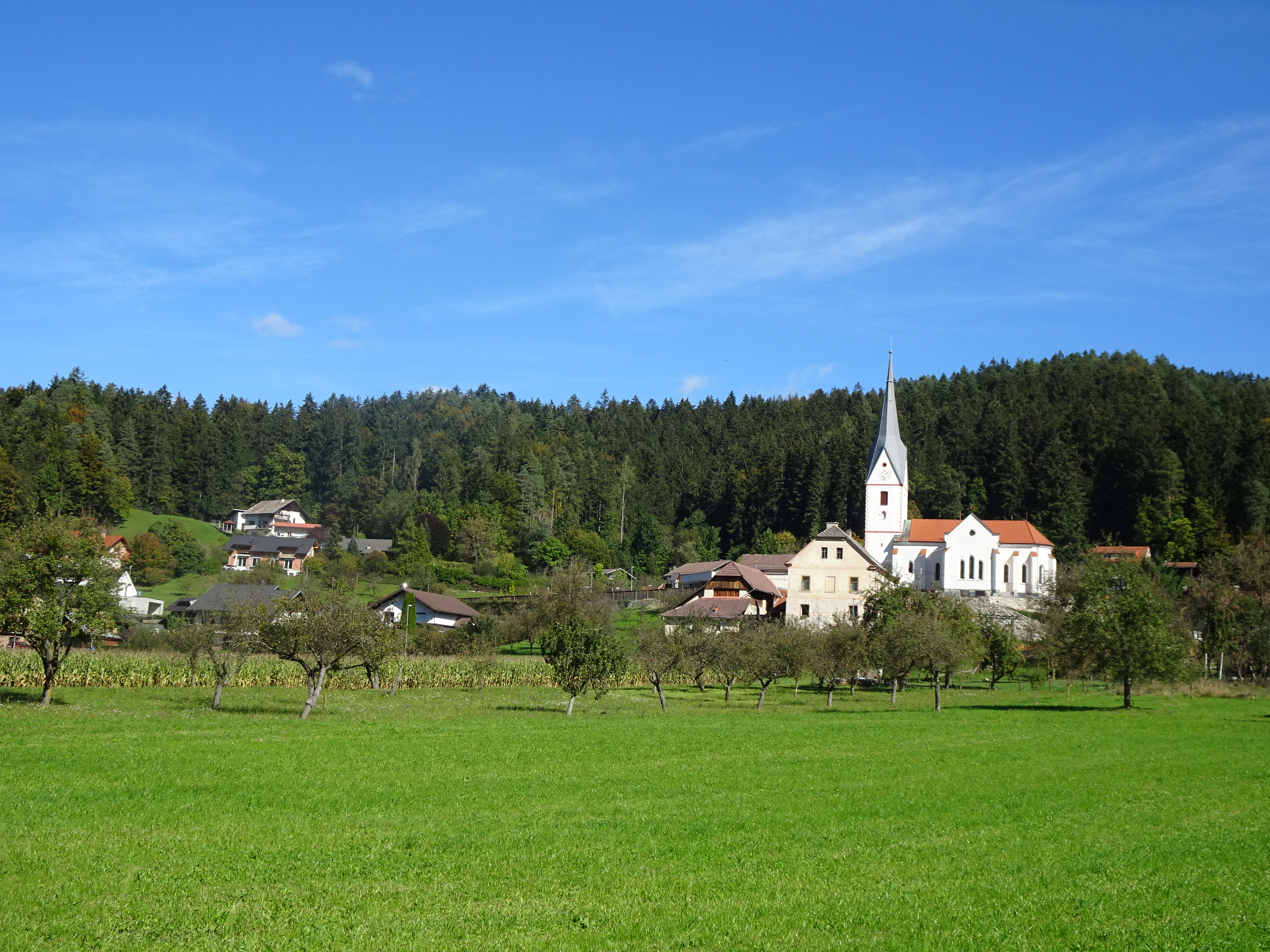
- Pameče

- Location in Slovenia
- Coordinates: 46°32′6.14″N 15°4′44.46″E
- Country: Slovenia
- Traditional region: Styria
- Statistical region: Carinthia
- Municipality: Slovenj Gradec

Area
  - Total: 18.382 km^{2} (7.097 sq mi)
- Elevation: 406.4 m (1,333 ft)

Population (2026)
  - Total: 1,265
  - Density: 80/km^{2} (210/sq mi)

Pameče (pronounced [ˈpaːmɛtʃɛ]) is a settlement in the City Municipality of Slovenj Gradec in northern Slovenia. The area is part of the traditional region of Styria. The entire municipality is now included in the Carinthia Statistical Region. In January 2026, the population was 1,265.

== Mass graves ==
Pameče is the site of two known mass graves associated with the Second World War. The Fuks 1 and 2 mass graves (Slovene: Grobišče Fuks 1, 2) are located at the Hribernik farm (at Pameče no. 183), 5 meters (16 ft) west and 20 meters (66 ft) south of the house, respectively. They contain the remains of an unidentified number of victims, believed to be mostly Croatians.

== Church ==
The parish church in the settlement is dedicated to Saint James (Slovene: sveti Jakob) and belongs to the Roman Catholic Archdiocese of Maribor. It was first mentioned in written documents dating to 1488. The current building dates to 1868. A second church on a hill north of the settlement is dedicated to Saint Anne and was built in 1530.
