= Sylvester E. Rowe =

Sierra Leonean diplomat

Sylvester E. Rowe is a former Ambassador and Deputy Permanent Representative of Sierra Leone to the United Nations. He joined the Mission in 1997 as an adviser after a distinguished career in the United Nations Secretariat spanning three decades during which he served in several capacities including head of the UN Radio and Television Services; a speech writer and Spokesman for the President of the 39th session of the UN General Assembly (1984–85), and a member of the panel of counsel in the UN administration of justice system – the Joint Appeals Board and the Administrative Tribunal. In 1994 he served as a resource person in Ambassador Brahimi's special mission on behalf of the Secretary-General of the United Nations, to Liberia and the ECOWAS Chair in Ghana, aimed at facilitating implementation of the Cotonou Peace Agreement for Liberia.

== Peace-building ==
As Ambassador and Deputy Permanent Representative, his areas of responsibility included disarmament and international security, peacekeeping, peacebuilding, human rights, Security Council reform, WMDs, sanctions regimes including and monitoring of Sierra Leone's diamond certification system aimed at ending the trade in conflict or so-called 'blood diamonds'. He served as Sierra Leone's representative in such bodies as the UN Commission on Human Rights in Geneva, and the Committees on Peacekeeping Operations, Palestinian Rights and Decolonization. He also played an active part in the drafting of the International Instrument on Marking and Tracing of Small Arms and Light Weapons, and the International Convention on the Rights of Persons with Disabilities. In 2005, under his chairmanship the UN Disarmament Commission broke more than a year-long impasse and reached agreement on its agenda. He was also Chairman of the Preparatory Committee for the first Review Conference on implementation of the UN Programme of Action on the illicit trade in small arms and light weapons.

== Negotiator ==
Between 1997 and 2007, Dr. Rowe served as ad hoc political and communication advisor to the President of Sierra Leone. A member of the Government delegation to the peace talks with the RUF rebels, he was one of the negotiators and drafters of the 1999 Lome Peace Agreement ending the eleven-year rebel war. He worked particularly in the political and disarmament aspects of the accord and the humanitarian content of the preamble. In 2001 he was the Personal Representative of the President of Sierra Leone in the UN process concerning child soldiers.

== Academic background ==
He is a graduate of Syracuse University, and the Graduate and University Center of the City University of New York, where he received his MA, M.Phil and PhD degrees. He was Visiting Professor at Long Island University (C.W. Post Campus) New York in 1998 and subsequently served as an adjunct professor. He was also adjunct professor at Fordham University in 2009. He has lectured and written on various issues pertaining to Sierra Leone in the areas of peacekeeping, disarmament, security, human rights and transitional justice. They include: "ECOMOG – a model for UN peacekeeping", Africa Law Today (The American Bar Association Section of International Law, October 1998); "Sierra Leone: the search for peace, justice and reconciliation” in Globalism: People, Profits and Progress (Kluwer Law International Publishers and the Canadian Council on International Law, 2002); "Sierra Leone: Pre-war and post-war security", Disarmament and Conflict Prevention (UN DDA Occasional Papers #7, May 2003); and “The tragedy of child soldiers: international law and prospects for prevention” (Association of the Bar of the City of New York on African Affairs, June 2004). He presented a paper on “Justice and peace negotiations” at the Wilton Park Conference Centre in Southern Sussex, UK, in September 2010. He was senior adviser to the Sierra Leone delegation to the 65th session of the UN General Assembly, September–December 2010. He has also served in that capacity for the 66th session of the Assembly.

A member of the American Society of International Law, among other professional bodies, Dr. Rowe occasionally serves as a judge in the international law students annual Jessup Moot Court Competition Eastern Regional rounds.

He is currently the NGO Representative of the International Association of Peace Messenger Cities (IAPMC).
