= Ljudmila Plesničar Gec =

Slovene archaeologist

- Ljudmila Plesničar attending a gallery opening at Lamut's Art Salon, 1978
- Born: Ljudmila Gec; 12 December 1931; Sežana, Province of Trieste, Kingdom of Italy
- Died: 10 July 2008 (aged 76); Ljubljana, Slovenia
- Other names: Ljudmila Plesničar-Gec
- Occupations: archaeologist, museum curator
- Years active: 1956–1996

Ljudmila Plesničar Gec (12 December 1931 – 10 July 2008) was a Slovenian archaeologist who specialized in uncovering the Roman history of Ljubljana. Best known for her excavations at Emona, she received the Valvasor Prize in 1985, the Golden Order of Freedom of the Republic of Slovenia in 1997, and was honored in 2000 with the Lifetime Achievement Award from the Archaeological Society of Slovenia.

== Early life ==
Ljudmila Gec was born on 12 December 1931, in Sežana during the annexation of the area to the Kingdom of Italy to Mila (née Mahnič) and Franc Gec. Her parents were farmers and Gec attended primary school and began her gymnasium studies in Sežana. She completed her secondary studies in Trieste. At the end of World War II, the family moved to Postojna. Gec entered the University of Ljubljana, where she studied archaeology under Srečko Brodar, Josip Korošec and Josipa Klemenca, graduating in 1956, and by 1957, was publishing in the name of Plesničar.

== Career ==
After completing her schooling, Plesničar began working at the Provincial Museum of Koper and later, worked in the City Archives. Moving to Ljubljana in 1961, she began working at the City Museum of Ljubljana as the head of the archaeological work at Emona. She led numerous excavations at the site, discovering an Early Christian religious center and baptistery, necropolises, the northern gate of the city, several residential areas and a Roman Forum. She began work on Emona in 1962 when construction equipment engaged in a project to restore the subway uncovered graves in the northern cemetery. Plesničar and her team uncovered over 1,000 graves at the site and began pressing for conservation measures to be enacted by the town council to protect archaeological sites. By 1965, regulations had been passed to require that archaeological preservation be integrated into construction planning. Extending her work to include urban planning, she introduced legislation requiring builders to provide insurance in their proposals to cover the costs of archaeological exploration, should remains be uncovered at proposed construction sites.

Unlike her predecessor, Jože Plečnik, who redesigned the Roman walls to create a pleasing artificial display of the artifacts, Plesničar adopted a minimal intervention approach, leaving remains in situ. She attempted to incorporate the archaeological sites within the modern urban environment to give an image of the diverse heritage of the city and provide a cultural experience for study. In 1967, Jakopič Gardens, now known as Emonan House, were opened to the public, after Plesničar's excavations in the 1963–1964 season uncovered the dwelling remains of a wealthy family on the outskirts of Ljubljana in the Mirje neighborhood. She prepared an exhibition in 1974 at the current location of the Bukvarna store, which exhibited the northern gates of Emona and the following year, completed her PhD with the thesis Kronološka in tipološka analiza lončenim emonskih grobišč (Chronological and typological analysis of Emona graveyard pottery). In 1976, she organized the opening of the Early Christian Centre as an archaeological park, and in the City Museum designed a comprehensive timeline to show the changing life in Emona.

Plesničar published numerous articles in domestic and foreign archaeological journals and actively participated in international events and symposiums. She served as president of the Slovenian Archaeological Society in the 1970s and as president of the Museum Society of Slovenia. She prepared, with the assistance of colleagues numerous exhibitions, such as the 1973 Frescoes of Emonia and the Archaeological Heritage of Ljubljana of 1996 and created international networks cooperating with museums in Aquileia, Belgrade, Krakow, Pula and Warsaw, among other cities. Plesničar was recognized with the Slovenian Museum Association's highest award, the Valvasor Prize, in 1985 for her work in curating and preserving the artifacts found at the Emona. In 1997, she was awarded the Golden Order of Freedom of the Republic of Slovenia by President Milan Kučan for her service in preserving the archaeological heritage of the country. She was honored with the Lifetime Achievement Award of the Archaeological Society of Slovenia in 2000.

== Death and legacy ==
Plesničar died on 10 July 2008, in Ljubljana. In 2010, a symposium was held in her honor at the City Museum of Ljubljana, with lectures detailing the archaeological history of Emona and her contributions. The lectures were compiled into a monograph and published in 2012 in a bi-lingual volume, Emona: med Akvilejo in Panonijo'Emona between Aquileia and Pannonia.

== Selected works ==
- "Zaščitno izkopavanje rimske stavbe ob Tržaški cesti v Ljubljani". Arheološki vestnik (in Slovenian) (1). Ljubljana, Yugoslavia: Inštitut za arheologijo SAZU: 453–467. 1966.
- La nécropole romaine à Emona. Inventaria archaeologica, 10. Jugoslavija (in French). Belgrade, Yugoslavia: Société archéologique de Yougoslavie. 1967. OCLC 715919264.
- "Obeležje in kronologija antičnih grobov na Prešernovi in Celovški cesti v Ljubljani". Arheološki vestnik (in Slovenian) (18). Ljubljana, Yugoslavia: Inštitut za arheologijo SAZU: 137–151. 1967.
- "Rimski vodnjak ob Ljubljanskih opekarnah v Ljubljani". Arheološki vestnik (in Slovenian) (19). Ljubljana, Yugoslavia: Inštitut za arheologijo SAZU: 403–414. 1968.
- "Emona v pozni antiki". Arheološki vestnik (in Slovenian) (21–22). Ljubljana, Yugoslavia: Inštitut za arheologijo SAZU: 117–122. 1971.
- Severno emonsko grobisce: The northern necropolis of Emona. Emona 3: Katalogi in monografije, 8 (in Slovenian and English). Ljubljana, Yugoslavia: Narodni muzej. 1972. OCLC 878218188.
- Emonske freske (in Slovenian). Ljubljana, Yugoslavia: Mestni muzej. 1973. OCLC 878218220.
- "La citta di Emona nel tardoantico e suoi ruderi paleocri-stiani". Arheološki vestnik (in Italian) (23). Ljubljana, Yugoslavia: Inštitut za arheologijo SAZU: 367–375. 1972.
- "Steklene zajemalke iz severnega emonskega grobišča". Arheološki vestnik (in Slovenian) (25). Ljubljana, Yugoslavia: Inštitut za arheologijo SAZU: 35–38. 1976.
- Dimitrijević, Danica, ed. (1978). "Emona at the beginning of great migration period". Problemi seobe naroda u Karpatskoj kotlini. Novi Sad, Yugoslavia: Matica srpska. pp. 59–64. (with Irena Sivec).
- "Porta praetoria—severna emonska vrata". Arheološki vestnik (in Slovenian) (25). Ljubljana, Yugoslavia: Inštitut za arheologijo SAZU: 387–391. 1976.
- Keramika emonskih nekropol. Dissertationes et monographiae, 20 (in Slovenian and English). Ljubljana, Yugoslavia: Mestni muzej. 1977. OCLC 878218213.
- "Rimski grob z Dolenjske ceste". Situla (in Slovenian) (20–21). Ljubljana, Yugoslavia: Narodni muzej v Ljubljani: 459–465. 1980. ISSN 0583-4554.
- Antična posoda iz emone s figuralnim prizorom: The figural vessel from Emona (in Slovenian and English). Ljubljana, Yugoslavia: Narodni muzej. 1982. OCLC 774017990.
- Starokrscanski center v Emoni: Old Christian center in Emona (in Slovenian and English). Ljubljana, Yugoslavia: Narodni muzej. 1983. OCLC 935291198.
- Antične freske v Sloveniji: The Roman frescoes of Slovenia (in Slovenian). Ljubljana, Slovenia: Narodni Muzej Slovenije. 1997. ISBN 978-9-616-16910-3, (with contributions by Veljko Toman).
