= Slovenj Gradec Airport =

Slovenj Gradec Airport Letališče Slovej Gradec
- IATA: none; ICAO: LJSG

Summary
- Airport type: Public
- Operator: AvioFun klub Koroška, d.o.o
- Serves: Carinthia (province)
- Location: Slovenj Gradec
- Elevation AMSL: 500 m / 1,640 ft
- Coordinates: 46°28′18.83″N 015°7′11″E
- Website: http://www.aerodrom-sg.si/index.php?stran=o_letaliscu&sklop=main&lang=en
- Interactive map of Slovenj Gradec Airport

Runways
Direction	Length		Surface
Direction	m	ft	Surface
14/32	1,000	3,281	Grass
14/32	1,200	3,936	Asphalt
14/32	620	2,034	Grass
14/32	480	1,574	Grass

Slovenj Gradec Airport (Slovene: Letališče Slovenj Gradec is an airport based in Slovenj Gradec and founded in 1937

== History ==
Beginning of sport aviation in Mislinja valley dates back in 1937. Since 1979 there is a new concrete runway which is 1200 meters long and 23 meters wide.

Aerodrom Slovenj Gradec Ltd. was established in 2002. Its main areas of work are aviation training, aviation maintenance, airplane sales and hotel management.

Aerodrom Slovenj Gradec Ltd. fulfils demands required by Slovenian CAA and works with Slovenian Air transportation Law. In winter 2002 the airport has begun with complete renovation of the airfield, including new hangar, new hotel, large parking area for 100 cars or 40 buses, modern air-petrol station etc.
