= Karel Pečko =

Slovenian academic painter and cultural worker

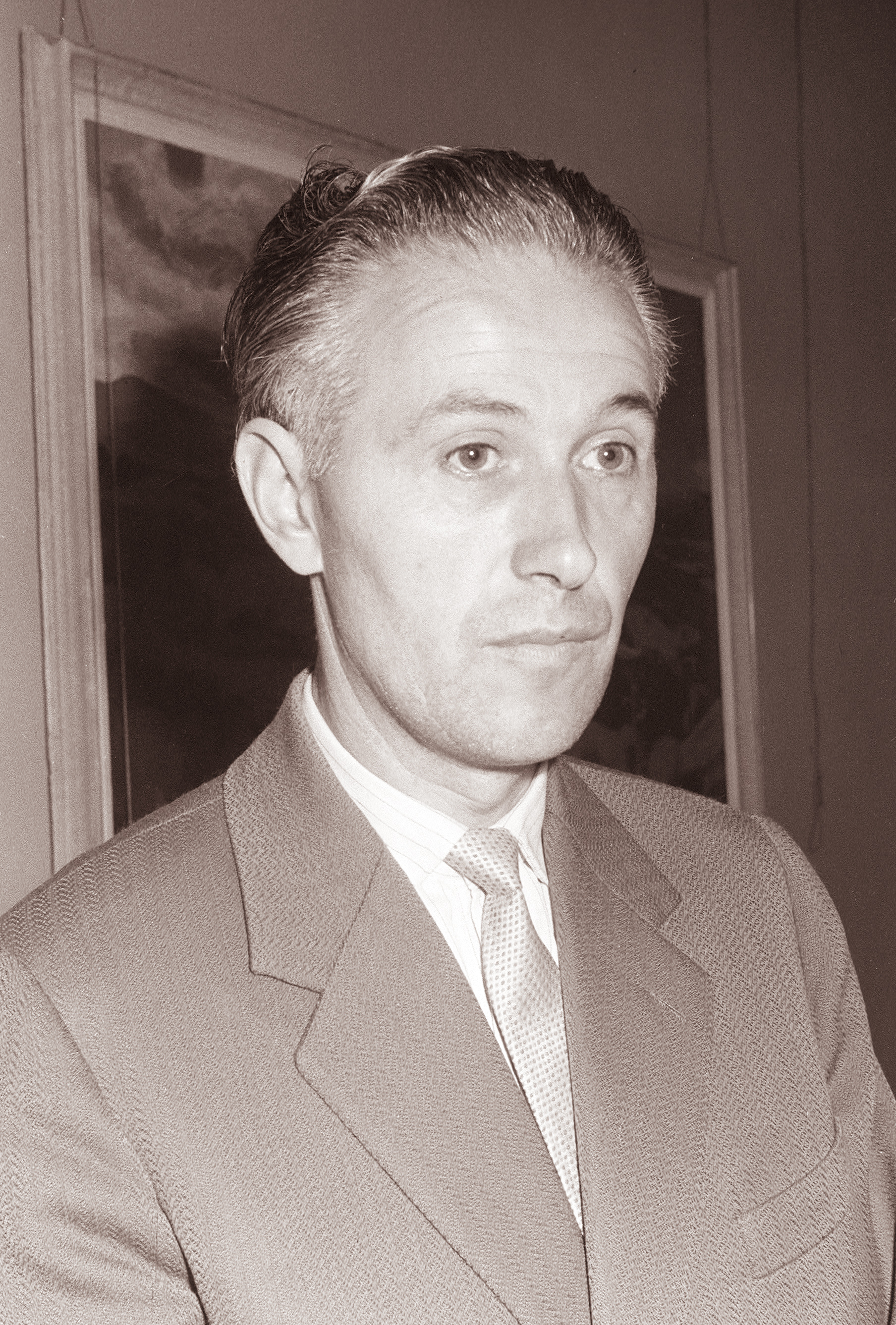
- Born: September 29, 1920; Vuhred, Kingdom of Yugoslavia
- Died: May 2, 2016 (aged 95); Slovenj Gradec, Slovenia
- Education: University of Ljubljana
- Awards: Honorary Medal of Freedom of the Republic of Slovenia (1996)

Karel Pečko (September 29, 1920 – May 2, 2016) was a Slovenian academic painter and cultural worker.

== Life and work ==
Karel Pečko received his degree in fine arts by graduating under Gojmir Anton Kos from the Ljubljana Academy of Fine Arts and Design in 1954. From 1954 to 1962, he taught art in primary and secondary school in Slovenj Gradec. In 1957 he established an arts pavilion alongside his teaching duties. In 1963, he became the school's principal. From 1975 to 1991 he headed a cultural institute in Slovenj Gradec. He also led the Slovenj Gradec Art Gallery (Slovene: Koroška galerija likovnih umetnosti) until 1997. He designed the exhibition programme and invited fine arts critics to participate as selectors, which was unusual in Slovene galleries in the 1960s. Pečko wished to give Slovenj Gradec a cosmopolitan character with the help of the fine arts. In addition to painting, Pečko also designed ceramics, stage props, mosaics, and showcases, worked in graphic design, and also taught other artists. He exhibited his artwork in many joint and individual exhibitions in Slovenj Gradec and abroad. He lived and worked in Slovenj Gradec. Pečko died in Slovenj Gradec on May 2, 2016, at the age of 95.

== Awards ==
He received multiple awards for his work in the arts and for his contribution to the gallery. Among his awards is the Honorary Medal of Freedom of the Republic of Slovenia (Častni znak svobode Republike Slovenije, 1996), which is the highest award in Slovenia and is conferred by the president of Slovenia.
