= Sveti Jernej nad Muto =

Sv. Jernej nad Muto Branik nad Muto (1955–1993)
- Location in Slovenia
- Coordinates: 46°38′58.25″N 15°8′9.67″E
- Country: Slovenia
- Traditional region: Styria
- Statistical region: Carinthia
- Municipality: Muta

Area
  - Total: 7.11 km^{2} (2.75 sq mi)
- Elevation: 816.7 m (2,679 ft)

Population (2002)
  - Total: 120

Sv. Jernej nad Muto (pronounced [ˈsʋeːti jɛɾˈneːi̯ nad ˈmuːtɔ]) is a dispersed settlement in the hills north of Muta in the historical Styria region in northern Slovenia, right on the border with Austria. It also includes the former village of Bistriški Jarek, which was incorporated into the settlement in 1953.

== Name ==
The name of the settlement was changed from Sveti Jernej nad Muto to Branik nad Muto in 1955. The name was changed on the basis of the 1948 Law on Names of Settlements and Designations of Squares, Streets, and Buildings as part of efforts by Slovenia's postwar communist government to remove religious elements from toponyms. The name Sv. Jernej nad Muto was introduced in 1993.

== Church ==
The parish church, from which the settlement gets its name, is dedicated to Saint Bartholomew (Slovene: Sveti Jernej) and was first mentioned in written documents dating to 1382. The current building dates to 1625 and belongs to the Roman Catholic Archdiocese of Maribor.
