= Sveti Jernej, Slovenske Konjice =

Sveti Jernej Sveti Jernej pri Ločah (until 1955), Jernej pri Ločah (1955–1999)
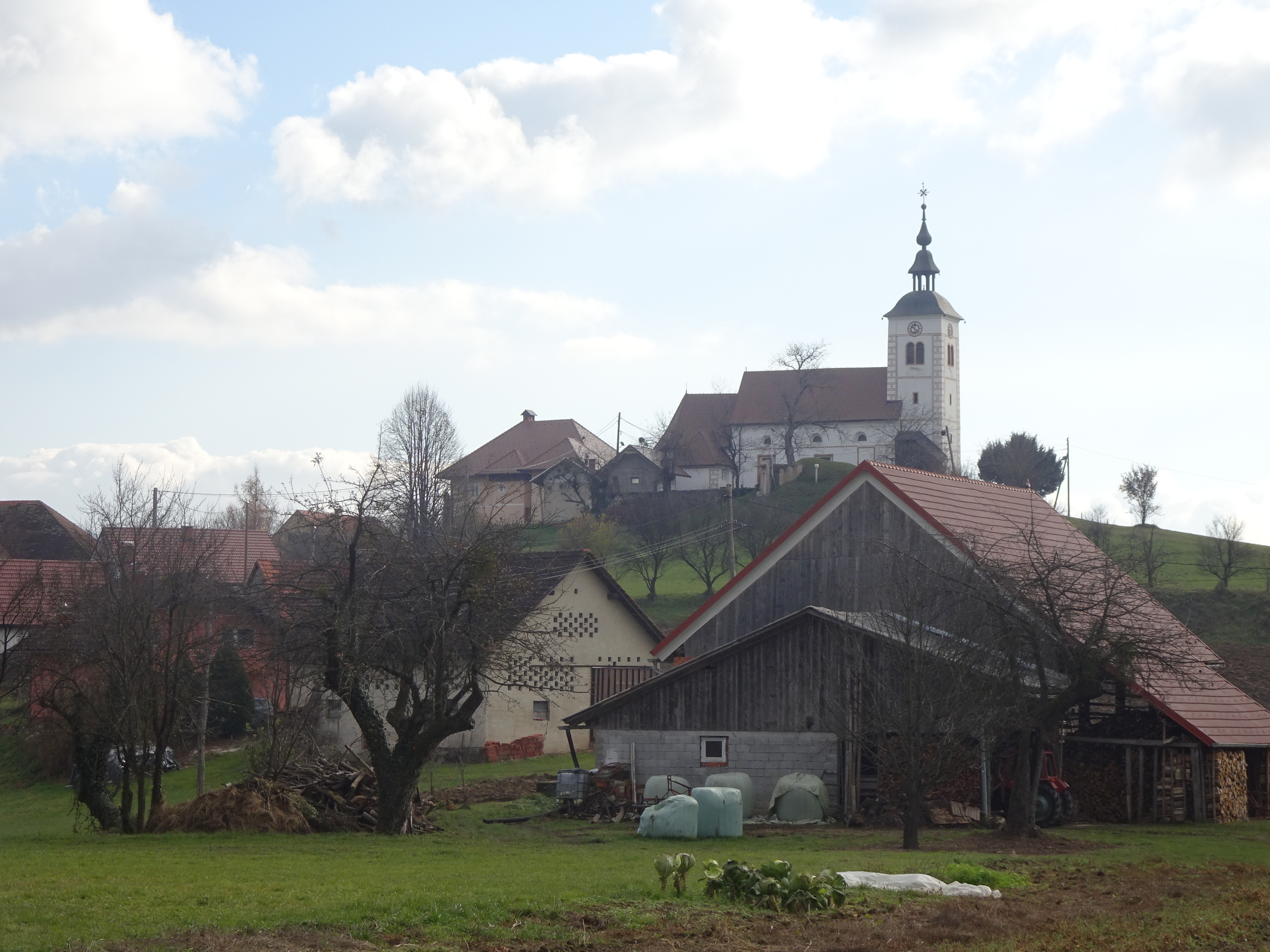

- Location in Slovenia
- Coordinates: 46°19′23.77″N 15°30′59.81″E
- Country: Slovenia
- Traditional region: Styria
- Statistical region: Savinja
- Municipality: Slovenske Konjice

Area
  - Total: 2.13 km^{2} (0.82 sq mi)
- Elevation: 349.2 m (1,146 ft)

Population (2002)
  - Total: 151

Sveti Jernej (pronounced [ˈsʋeːti ˈjɛːɾnɛi̯]) is a village in the Municipality of Slovenske Konjice in eastern Slovenia. The area is part of the traditional region of Styria. The municipality is now included in the Savinja Statistical Region.

== Name ==
The name of the settlement was changed from Sveti Jernej pri Ločah (literally, 'Saint Bartholomew near Loče') to Jernej pri Ločah (literally, 'Bartholomew near Loče') in 1955. The name was changed on the basis of the 1948 Law on Names of Settlements and Designations of Squares, Streets, and Buildings as part of efforts by Slovenia's postwar communist government to remove religious elements from toponyms. The name Sveti Jernej was restored in 1999. Locally, the settlement is known as Árnij.

== Church ==
The parish church from which the settlement gets its name is dedicated to Saint Bartholomew (Slovene: sveti Jernej). It is a 14th-century church that was remodelled in the Baroque style in the 18th century. It belongs to the Roman Catholic Archdiocese of Maribor.
