= Šmiklavž, Slovenj Gradec =

Šmiklavž
- Location in Slovenia
- Coordinates: 46°26′59″N 15°7′12″E
- Country: Slovenia
- Traditional region: Styria
- Statistical region: Carinthia
- Municipality: Slovenj Gradec

Area
  - Total: 3.990 km^{2} (1.541 sq mi)
- Elevation: 557.6 m (1,829 ft)

Population (2026)
  - Total: 136
  - Density: 34/km^{2} (88/sq mi)

Šmiklavž (pronounced [ʃmiˈklaːu̯ʃ]) is a settlement in the City Municipality of Slovenj Gradec in northern Slovenia. The area is part of the traditional region of Styria. The entire municipality is now included in the Carinthia Statistical Region. In January 2026, the population was 136.

The parish church from which the settlement gets its name is dedicated to Saint Nicholas (Slovene: sveti Miklavž) and belongs to the Roman Catholic Archdiocese of Maribor. It dates to the 13th and 16th centuries. A second church on a hill south of the settlement is dedicated to Saint Helena. The earliest phases of the building date to the 13th century.
