= Šmartno pri Slovenj Gradcu =

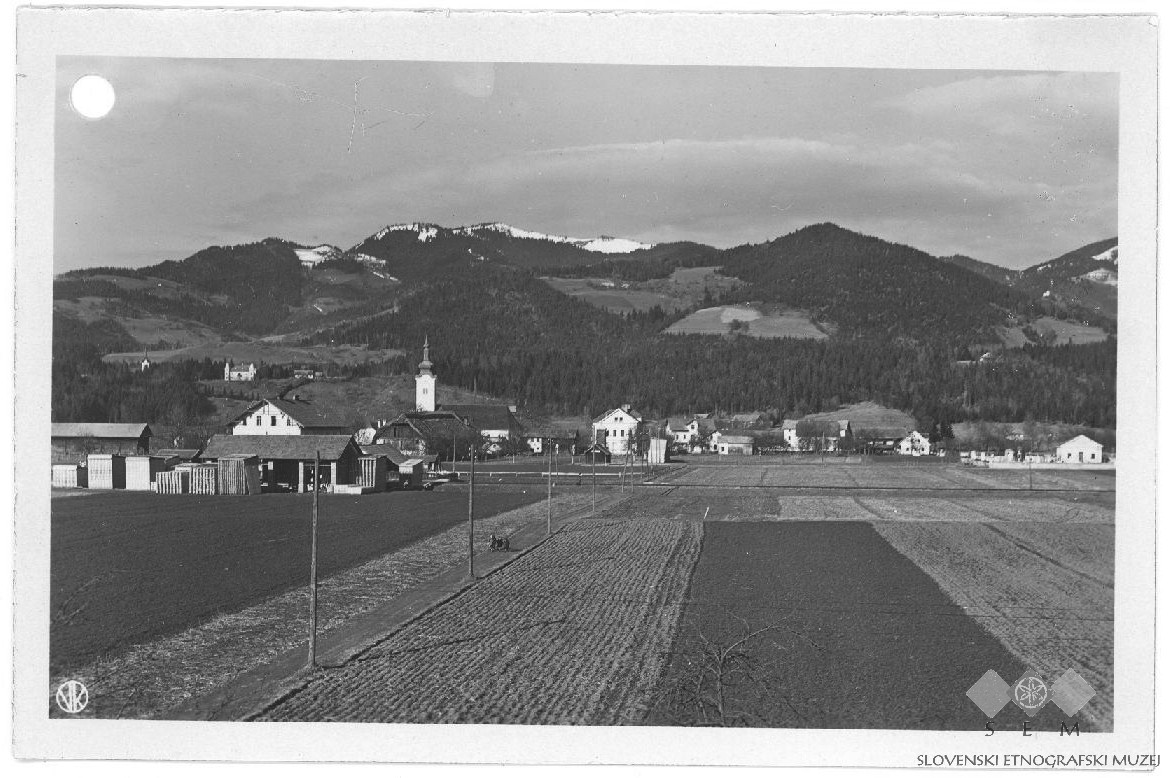
- Postcard of Šmartno pri Slovenj Gradcu

- Location in Slovenia
- Coordinates: 46°29′27.35″N 15°6′27.86″E
- Country: Slovenia
- Traditional region: Styria
- Statistical region: Carinthia
- Municipality: Slovenj Gradec

Area
  - Total: 5.858 km^{2} (2.262 sq mi)
- Elevation: 440.5 m (1,445 ft)

Population (2026)
  - Total: 1,254
  - Density: 214/km^{2} (550/sq mi)

Šmartno pri Slovenj Gradcu (pronounced [ˈʃmaːɾtnɔ pɾi slɔˈʋeːn ˈɡɾaːtsu]; sometimes Šmartno pri Slovenjem Gradcu) is a settlement in the City Municipality of Slovenj Gradec in northern Slovenia. The area is part of the traditional region of Styria. The entire municipality is now included in the Carinthia Statistical Region. In January 2026, the population was 1,254.

== Church ==
The parish church from which the settlement gets its name is dedicated to Saint Martin and belongs to the Roman Catholic Archdiocese of Maribor. It was first mentioned in written documents dating to 1106. A second church on Homec Hill west of the settlement is dedicated to the Assumption of Mary and was built in the 17th century.

== Mass graves ==
Šmartno pri Slovenj Gradcu is the site of two known mass graves from the period immediately after the Second World War. The Gortnar Shrine Mass Grave (Slovene: Grobišče pri Gortnarjevi kapelici) lies northwest of the settlement, behind the Gortnar chapel-shrine. It measures 12 by 4 meters (39 by 13 ft) and contains the remains of 30 to 36 people, probably Ustaša soldiers, who were killed while fleeing toward the Austrian border between 10 and 15 May 1945. The House No. 143 Mass Grave (Grobišče pri hiši 143), also known as the Homšnica Creek by the Klemen Farm Mass Grave (Grobišče ob Homšnici pri Klemenu), is located next to the road southwest of the house at Šmartno pri Slovenj Gradcu no. 143. The ground is visibly sunken at the site. It contains the remains of 10 people killed while fleeing toward the Austrian border between 10 and 15 May 1945.
