= Muta, Muta =

Muta
- Settlement
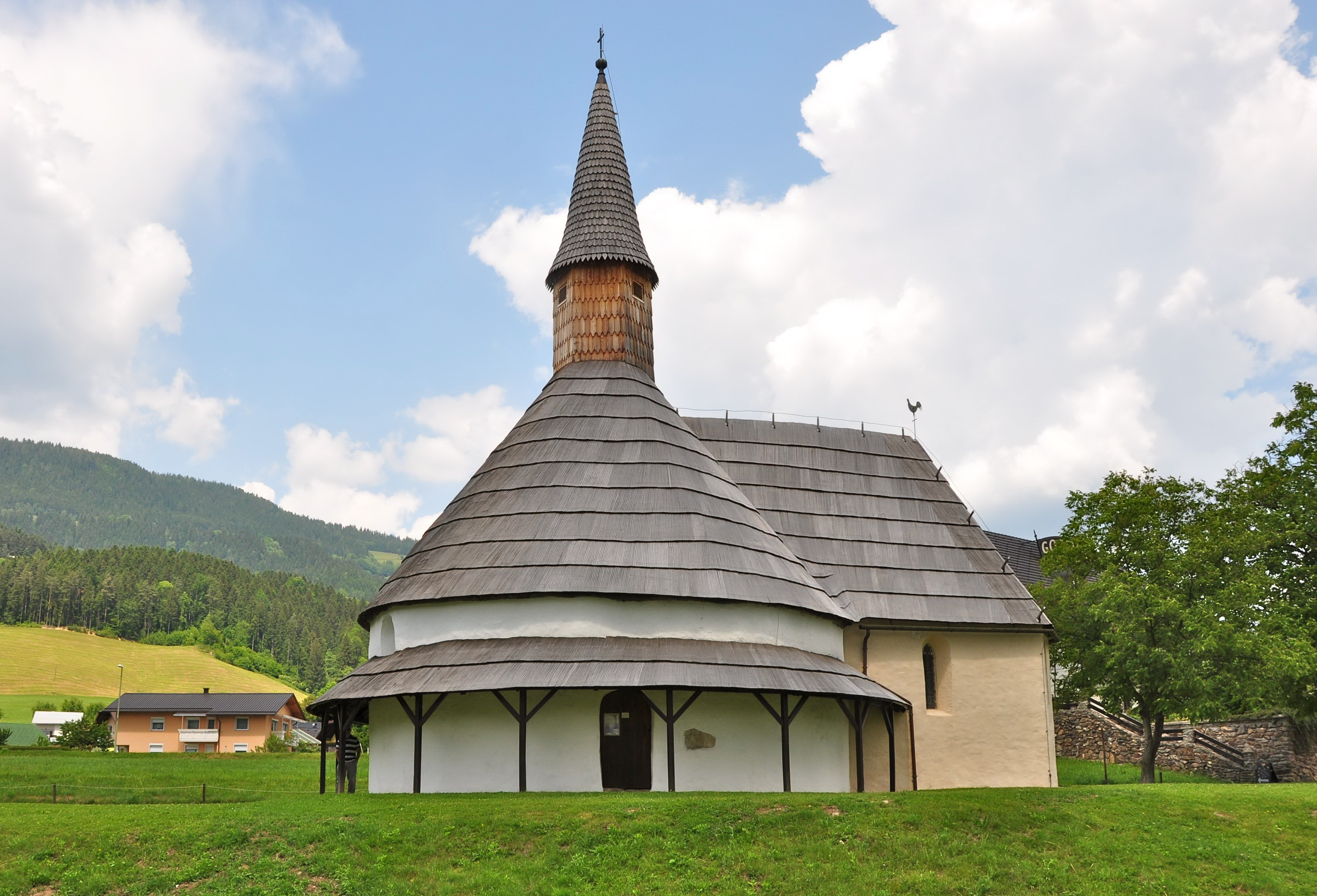

- Location of Muta in Slovenia
- Coordinates: 46°37′N 15°10′E
- Country: Slovenia
- Traditional region: Styria
- Statistical region: Carinthia
- Municipality: Muta

Government
  - Mayor: Angelca Mrak

Area
  - Total: 5.3 km^{2} (2.0 sq mi)

Population (2012)
  - Total: 2,291
  - Density: 433/km^{2} (1,120/sq mi)
- Time zone: UTC+01 (CET)
  - Summer (DST): UTC+02 (CEST)

Muta (pronounced [ˈmuːta]; German: Hohenmauthen) is the largest settlement and the centre of the Carinthia Statistical Region of northern Slovenia. Traditionally, it is part of Styria because it was part of the Duchy of Styria. The Muta Bistrica (Slovene: Mučka Bistrica) flows though the town, where it enters the Drava River.

== Name ==
Muta was first attested in written sources in 1255 as Muttenberch (and as Můtenberch in 1265–67, Moutenberch in 1279, Maeut in 1349, Mautenberch in 1405, and Mawt in 1459). The Slovene name is derived from the Slovene common noun muta 'toll (payment)', derived from Middle High German mûte 'toll (payment)'. It therefore refers to a place where tolls were collected.

== Mass grave ==
Muta is the site of a mass grave associated with the Second World War. The Croatian Mass Grave (Slovene: Grobišče Hrvatov) is a cluster of seven locations in the northeast part of the settlement on the bank of the Drava River. It contains the remains of Croatians.

== Church ==
The parish church in the settlement is dedicated to Saint Margaret (Slovene: sveta Marjeta) and belongs to the Roman Catholic Archdiocese of Maribor. It was first mentioned in written documents dating to 1349. In the 17th century it was extended and widened. There are two other churches in Muta. The church dedicated to John the Baptist in the hamlet of Spodnja Muta in the settlement is an 11th-century Romanesque rotunda with an Early Gothic sanctuary added. Fourteenth-century wall paintings survive in the church and the wooden painted ceiling is from the late 16th and early 17th century. The church on the bank of the Drava River in the south of the settlement is dedicated to Saint Peter and is a late Romanesque single-nave building from the 13th century with various alterations over the centuries.
