= Slovenj Gradec =

- Town
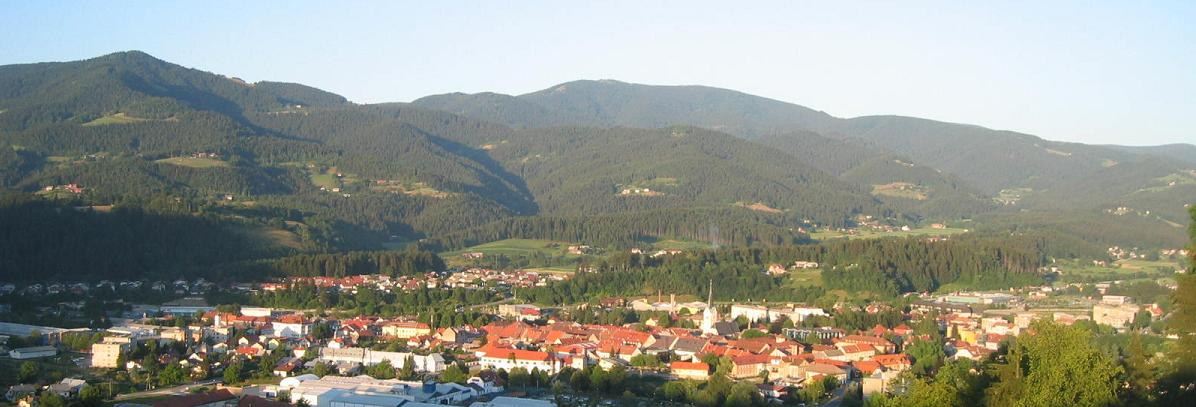
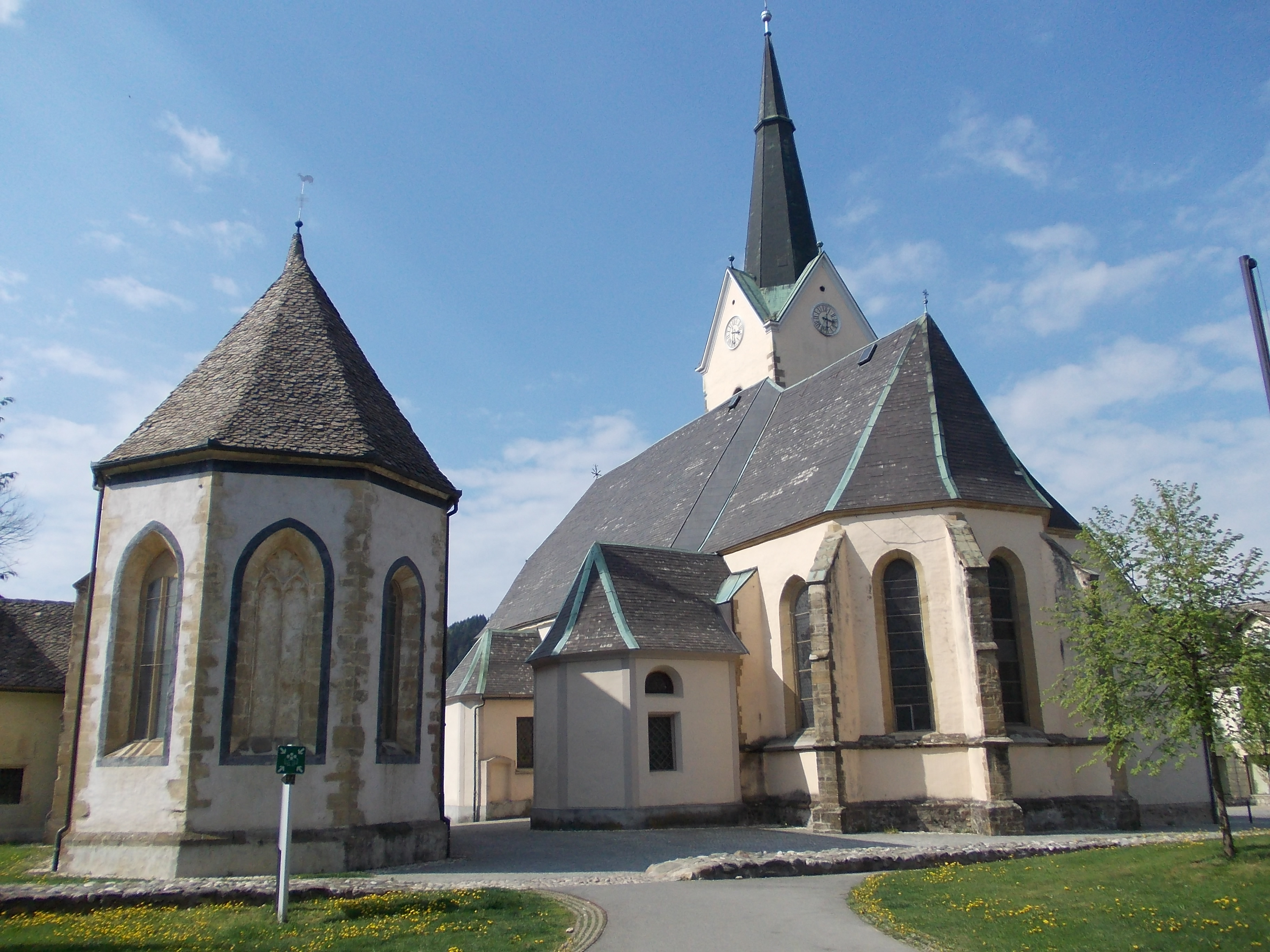
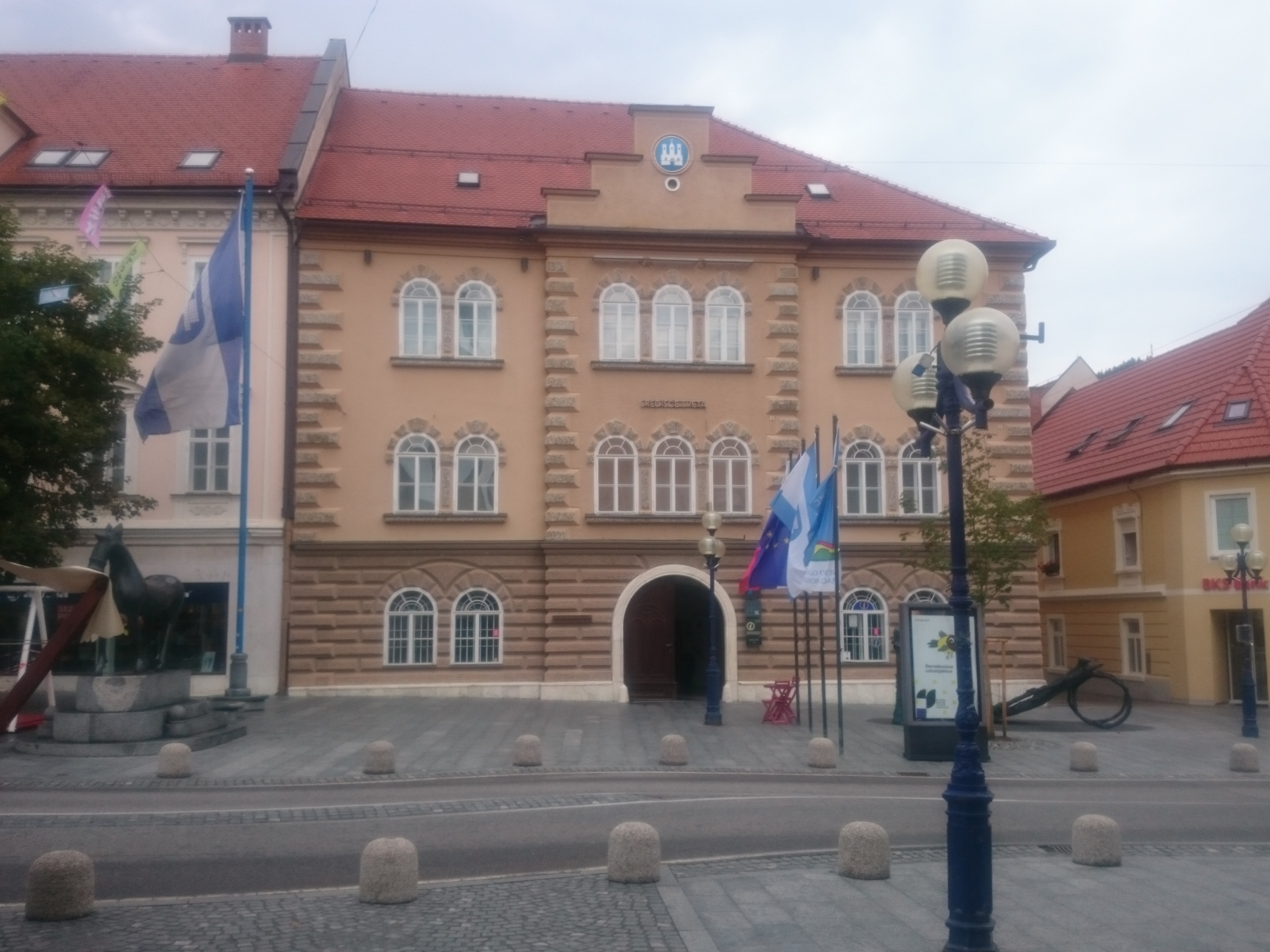
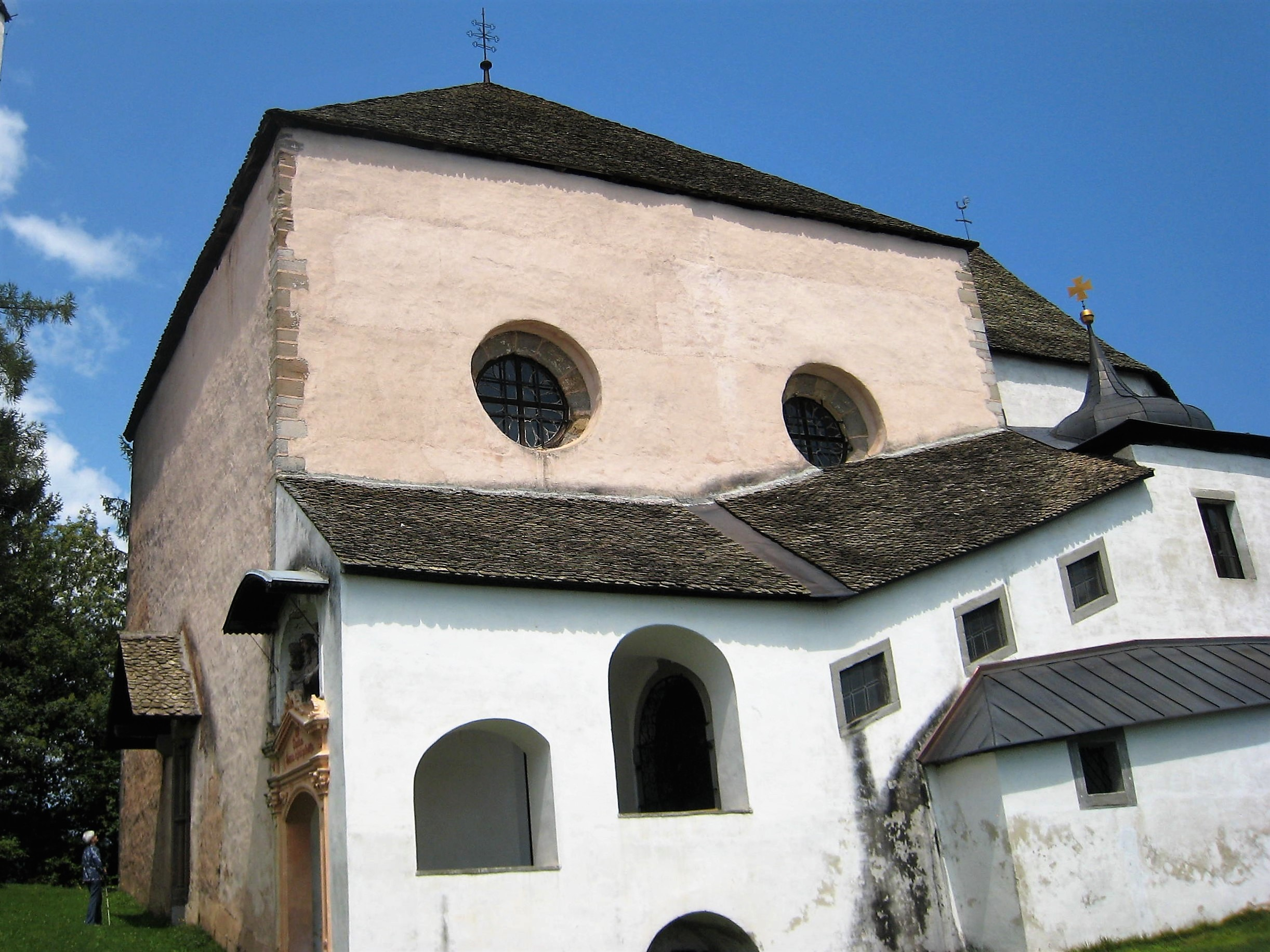
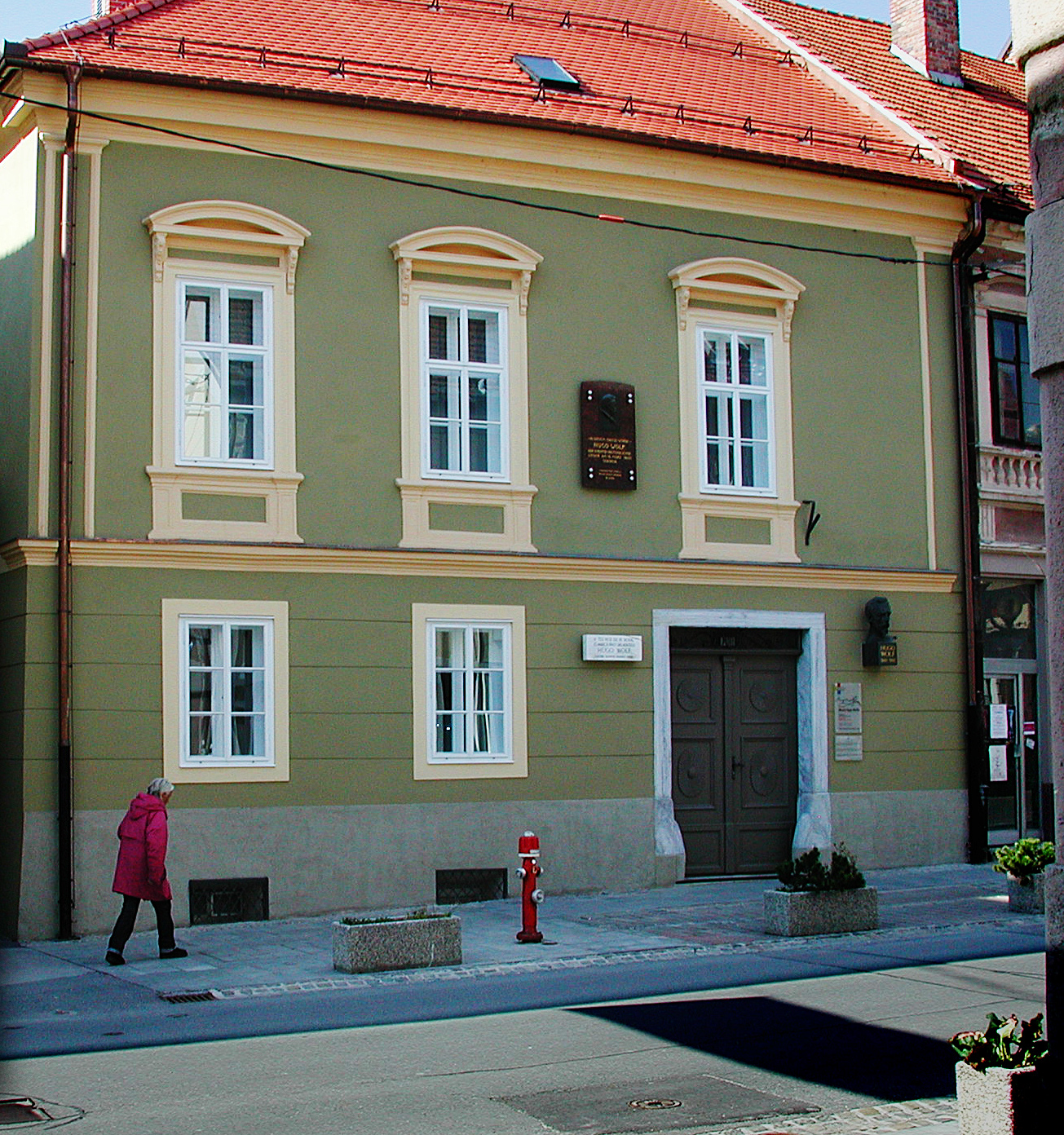
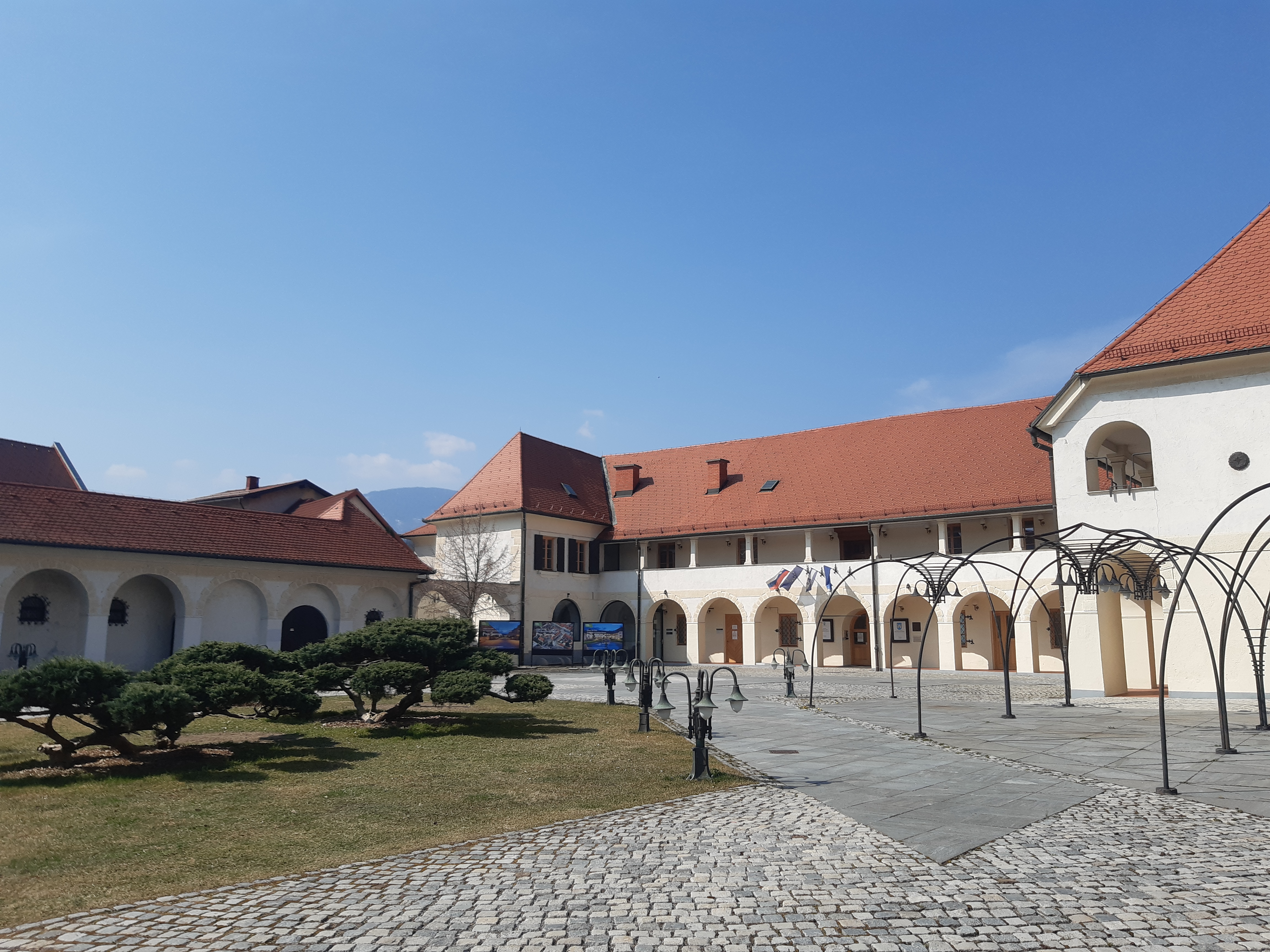
- From top, left to right: Panorama of Slovenj Gradec, St. Elisabeth's Parish Church, Carinthian Regional Museum, St. Pancras's Church, Hugo Wolf's house, Rotenturn Manor

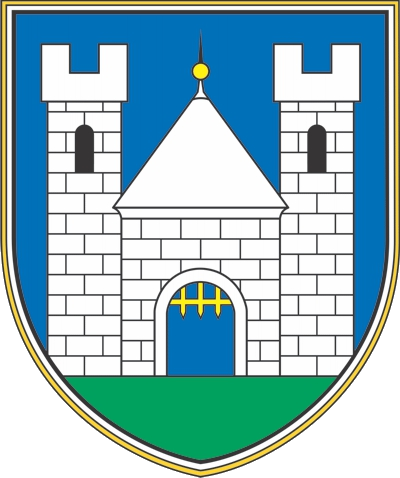
- Coat of arms

- Location in Slovenia
- Coordinates: 46°30′33.69″N 15°4′44.97″E
- Country: Slovenia
- Traditional region: Styria
- Statistical region: Carinthia
- Municipality: Slovenj Gradec

Area
  - Total: 5.60 km^{2} (2.16 sq mi)
- Elevation: 413 m (1,355 ft)

Population (2020)
  - Total: 7,249
  - Density: 1,290/km^{2} (3,350/sq mi)
- Postal code: 2380
- Climate: Dfb
- Licence plate: SG
- Website: www.slovenjgradec.si

Slovenj Gradec (pronounced [slɔˈʋéːŋ ˈɡɾàːdəts]; German: Windischgrätz, after about 1900 Windischgraz) is a town in northern Slovenia. It is the centre of the Urban Municipality of Slovenj Gradec. It is part of the historical Styria region, and since 2005 it has belonged to the NUTS-3 Carinthia Statistical Region. It is located in the Mislinja Valley at the eastern end of the Karawanks mountain range, about 45 km (28 mi) west of Maribor and 65 km (40 mi) northeast of Ljubljana.

== History ==
Gradec, Slovene for 'little castle', was first mentioned in a 1091 deed, then part of the Imperial March of Styria. The prefix Windisch (the traditional German name for Slavs in general and Slovenes in particular) was added to distinguish it from the city Graz (whose name has the same etymology). The modern Slovene name, Slovenj Gradec (literally: the Slovene Graz), derives from this German denomination. From 1180 until 1918, Slovenj Gradec belonged to the Duchy of Styria, since 1804 a crown land of the Austrian Empire. It was the ancestral seat of the Windisch-Graetz noble family first documented in 1220. Upon the dissolution of Austria-Hungary in 1918, with the rest of Lower Styria, it was included in the newly established Kingdom of the Serbs, Croats and Slovenes.

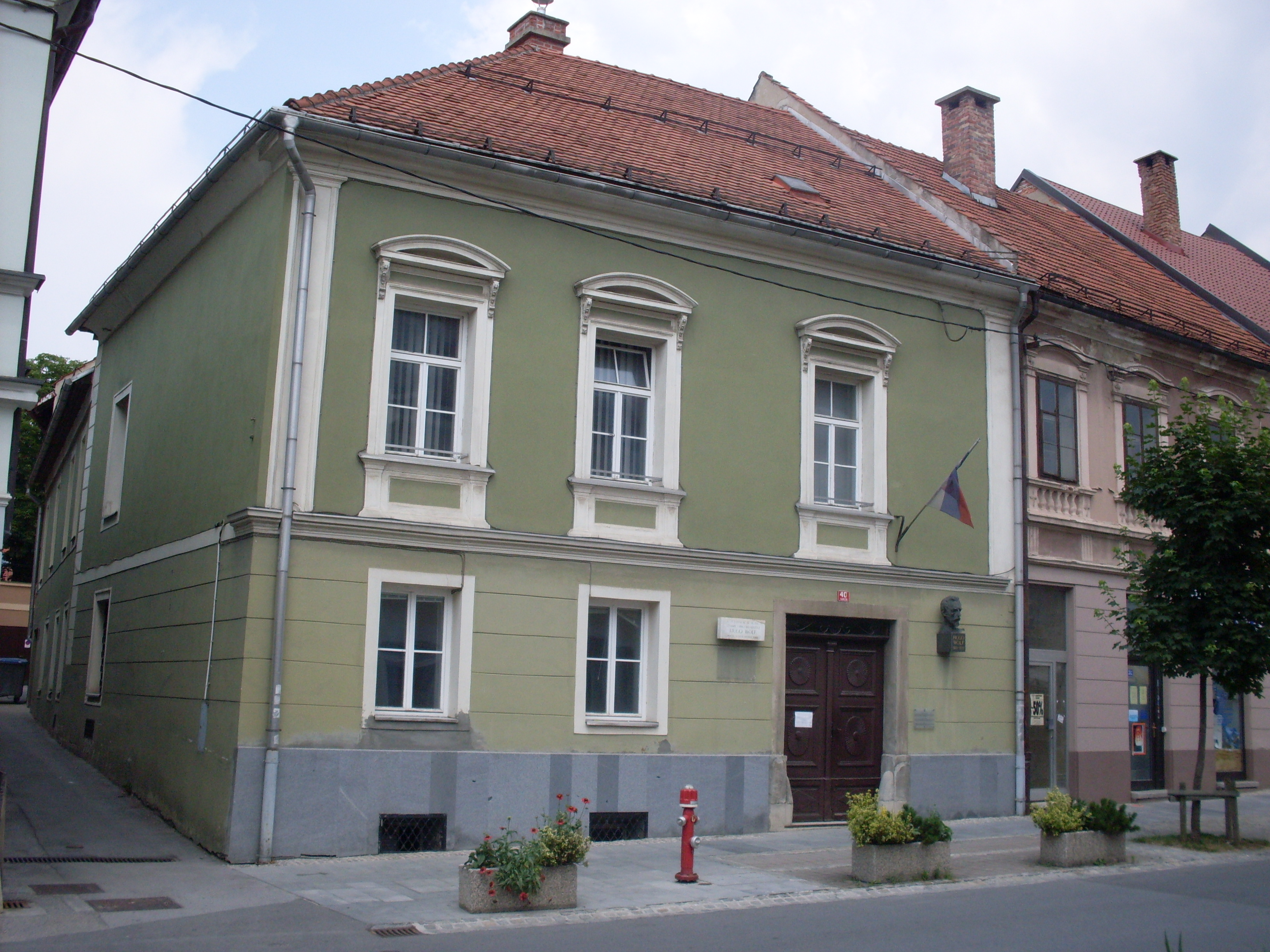
Birthplace of Hugo Wolf

Until 1918, the town was a German-speaking island in a Slovene-speaking area. In the 1880 census, the town was 75 percent German-speaking and 25 percent Slovene-speaking. Many inhabitants, like the family of the composer Hugo Wolf, were of mixed ethnic origin. After the end of World War I, many of the local German-speaking inhabitants emigrated to Austria. Those who remained were gradually assimilated into the now Slovene-speaking majority. During World War Two, the town was occupied by the Nazis and annexed to the Third Reich. The local Slovenes were submitted to a policy of violent Germanization and many died of various persecutions. The partisan insurgency developed in the area, especially in the hills to the east of the town. After World War II, the remaining ethnic Germans were expelled from Yugoslavia, and Slovenj Gradec lost its traditional presence of German speakers.

From the 1950s onward, the town experienced a rapid industrialization and eventually became the unofficial economic and political center for Slovenian Carinthia. In 1994, it became one of the 11 municipalities in Slovenia with the status of Urban Municipality.

== Climate ==
Climate data for Slovenj Gradec (1991–2020 normals, extremes 1950–2020)
Month	Jan	Feb	Mar	Apr	May	Jun	Jul	Aug	Sep	Oct	Nov	Dec	Year
Record high °C (°F)	15.6 (60.1)	20.2 (68.4)	23.0 (73.4)	27.3 (81.1)	31.6 (88.9)	34.9 (94.8)	35.5 (95.9)	38.2 (100.8)	31.3 (88.3)	25.6 (78.1)	20.5 (68.9)	17.3 (63.1)	38.2 (100.8)
Mean daily maximum °C (°F)	2.9 (37.2)	6.1 (43.0)	11.0 (51.8)	15.8 (60.4)	20.3 (68.5)	24.0 (75.2)	26.0 (78.8)	25.6 (78.1)	20.4 (68.7)	15.3 (59.5)	9.6 (49.3)	2.7 (36.9)	14.9 (58.8)
Daily mean °C (°F)	−1.7 (28.9)	0.2 (32.4)	4.5 (40.1)	9.3 (48.7)	14.0 (57.2)	17.8 (64.0)	19.2 (66.6)	18.5 (65.3)	13.8 (56.8)	9.2 (48.6)	4.2 (39.6)	−1.1 (30.0)	9.0 (48.2)
Mean daily minimum °C (°F)	−5.7 (21.7)	−4.6 (23.7)	−1.0 (30.2)	3.1 (37.6)	7.7 (45.9)	11.7 (53.1)	13.0 (55.4)	12.7 (54.9)	8.9 (48.0)	5.0 (41.0)	1.1 (34.0)	−4.3 (24.3)	4.0 (39.2)
Record low °C (°F)	−27.2 (−17.0)	−26.5 (−15.7)	−24.7 (−12.5)	−11.0 (12.2)	−5.8 (21.6)	−2.1 (28.2)	2.2 (36.0)	1.1 (34.0)	−3.1 (26.4)	−9.4 (15.1)	−19.0 (−2.2)	−23.2 (−9.8)	−27.2 (−17.0)
Average precipitation mm (inches)	41 (1.6)	49 (1.9)	59 (2.3)	72 (2.8)	99 (3.9)	130 (5.1)	136 (5.4)	127 (5.0)	132 (5.2)	105 (4.1)	98 (3.9)	67 (2.6)	1,116 (43.9)
Average extreme snow depth cm (inches)	10 (3.9)	11 (4.3)	4 (1.6)	0 (0)	0 (0)	0 (0)	0 (0)	0 (0)	0 (0)	0 (0)	1 (0.4)	5 (2.0)	2.6 (1.0)
Average precipitation days (≥ 0.1 mm)	9	8	10	12	14	14	14	13	12	11	12	10	140
Average snowy days (≥ 0 cm)	20	16	9	1	0	0	0	0	0	0	4	14	64
Average relative humidity (%) (at 14:00)	74	61	56	53	52	54	53	54	58	65	73	79	61
Mean monthly sunshine hours	84.3	110.0	153.6	183.1	215.4	233.1	257.5	242.1	169.8	131.8	73.6	65.8	1,920.1
Source 1: Slovenian Environment Agency (humidity and snow 1981–2010)
Source 2: NOAA (sun 1991–2020), Ogimet

Historical population
Year	Pop.	±%
1948	1,931	—
1953	2,231	+15.5%
1961	2,925	+31.1%
1971	4,195	+43.4%
1981	5,782	+37.8%
1991	6,720	+16.2%
2002	7,712	+14.8%
2011	7,519	−2.5%
2021	7,267	−3.4%
Population size may be affected by changes in administrative divisions.

== Main sights ==
The parish church in the town is dedicated to Saint Elizabeth of Hungary and belongs to the Roman Catholic Archdiocese of Maribor. It was first mentioned in written documents from 1235. Next to it stands a Gothic chapel dedicated to the Holy Spirit with frescos dating to the mid-15th century.

In 1994, an archaeological excavation uncovered the remains of what is believed to be the oldest church in Styria, dating to the Carolingian period (second half of the 9th century).

The Slovenj Gradec Art Gallery (Slovene: Koroška galerija likovne umetnosti) was founded in 1957 and is located on the first floor of the old town hall in the town centre. The gallery hosted international fine art exhibitions under the sponsorship of the United Nations in 1966, 1975, 1979, 1985, and 1991. The 1997 exhibition "The Artist and Urban Environment" displayed art activity in Peace Messenger Cities from all over the world. In 2012, Slovenj Gradec and Ptuj were partners with Maribor, the European Capital of Culture. As a result, the gallery presented further exhibitions that attracted Europe-wide attention.

== Notable residents ==
Notable people that were born or lived in Slovenj Gradec include:

- Roman Bezjak (born 1989), footballer
- Ivo Ban (born 1949), actor
- Katarina Čas (born 1976), actress
- Sašo Fornezzi (born 1982), footballer
- Ivan Gams (sl) (1923–2014), geographer
- Janja Garnbret (born 1999), rock climber, Olympic champion
- Ana Gros (born 1991), handball player
- Manica Janežič Ambrožič (born 1973), TV personality
- Matjaž Jelen (born 1966), singer
- Lado Kralj (1938–2022), writer, theatre critic, and literary historian
- Marko Mandić (born 1974), actor
- Tina Maze (born 1983), skier, Olympic champion
- Boštjan Nachbar (born 1980), basketball player
- Vinko Ošlak (born 1947), author
- Karel Pečko (1920–2016), artist
- Iztok Puc (1966–2011), handball player
- Boštjan Romih (born 1976), TV personality
- Renata Salecl (born 1962), philosopher
- Adi Smolar (born 1959), singer-songwriter
- Katarina Srebotnik (born 1981), tennis player
- Ilka Štuhec (born 1990), alpine ski racer
- Marko Šuler (born 1983), football player
- Nikola Tolimir (born 1989), footballer
- Tadej Trdina (born 1988), footballer
- Tine Urnaut (born 1988), volleyball player
- Klemen Čebulj (born 1992), volleyball player
- Natalija Verboten (born 1976), singer
- Hugo Wolf (1860–1903), composer. The house in which he was born is now a museum.

== International relations ==
=== Twin towns — Sister cities ===
Slovenj Gradec is twinned with:

- Gornji Milanovac, Serbia
- Český Krumlov, Czech Republic
- Hauzenberg, Germany
- Vöcklabruck, Austria
- Myōkō, Japan
- Morphou, Cyprus

Charter of cultural cooperation was signed with Bardejov, Slovakia.

=== International Association of Peace Messenger Cities ===
Since 1989, Slovenj Gradec was one of the most active and progressive cities within The International Association of Peace Messenger Cities, being a member of its executive board since 1997 and secretary-general of this organization in periods 2007–2010, 2010–2013, 2013–2016, and 2016–2019.
