= Carinthia Statistical Region =

Coordinates: 46°33′00″N 15°03′00″E

Carinthia Statistical Region koroška statistična regija
- Statistical region
- Municipalities: 12
- Largest city: Slovenj Gradec

Area
  - Total: 1,041 km^{2} (402 sq mi)

Population (2020)
  - Total: 70,755
  - Density: 67.97/km^{2} (176.0/sq mi)

Statistics
  - Households: 28628
  - Employed: 23782
  - Registered unemployed: 4050
  - College/university students: 2988
  - Regional GDP (2019): EUR 1,321 bn (EUR 18,694 per capita)
- HDI (2022): 0.892 very high · 8th

The Carinthia Statistical Region (Slovene: koroška statistična regija) is a statistical region in northern Slovenia along the border with Austria.

The region is difficult to access and is poorly connected with the central part of Slovenia. The environment has been strongly affected by heavy industry in the valleys. The importance of agriculture is shown by the fact that the farms in the region are among the largest in the country. More than 90% of farms in the region are engaged in breeding livestock. Farm owners in the region have the youngest average age in Slovenia (53 years); they average eight years younger than farm owners in the Coastal–Karst Statistical Region. In 2013 the registered unemployment rate was higher than the national average. The difference between the registered unemployment rate for men and women was the highest among the statistical regions: for women it was 7 percentage points higher than for men. The share of five-year survivals among new enterprises was the highest here (59% of all new enterprises in 2012).

== Cities and towns ==
The Carinthia Statistical Region includes 5 cities and towns, the largest of which is Slovenj Gradec.

Rank	Name	Population (2021)
1.	Slovenj Gradec	7,267
2.	Ravne na Koroškem	7,254
3.	Prevalje	4,627
4.	Mežica	3,164
5.	Dravograd	3,095

== Municipalities ==
The Carinthia Statistical Region comprises the following 12 municipalities:

- Črna na Koroškem
- Dravograd
- Mežica
- Mislinja
- Muta
- Podvelka
- Prevalje
- Radlje ob Dravi
- Ravne na Koroškem
- Ribnica na Pohorju
- Slovenj Gradec
- Vuzenica

== Demographics ==
The population in 2020 was 70,755.

== Economy ==
Employment structure: 46.6% services, 49.6% industry, 3.8% agriculture.

=== Tourism ===
The region attracts only 1.1% of the total number of tourists in Slovenia, most being from Slovenia (66.7%).

== Transportation ==
- Length of motorways: 0 km
- Length of other roads: 1,620.7 km

== Sources ==
- Slovenian regions in figures 2014
