= Veliki Boč =

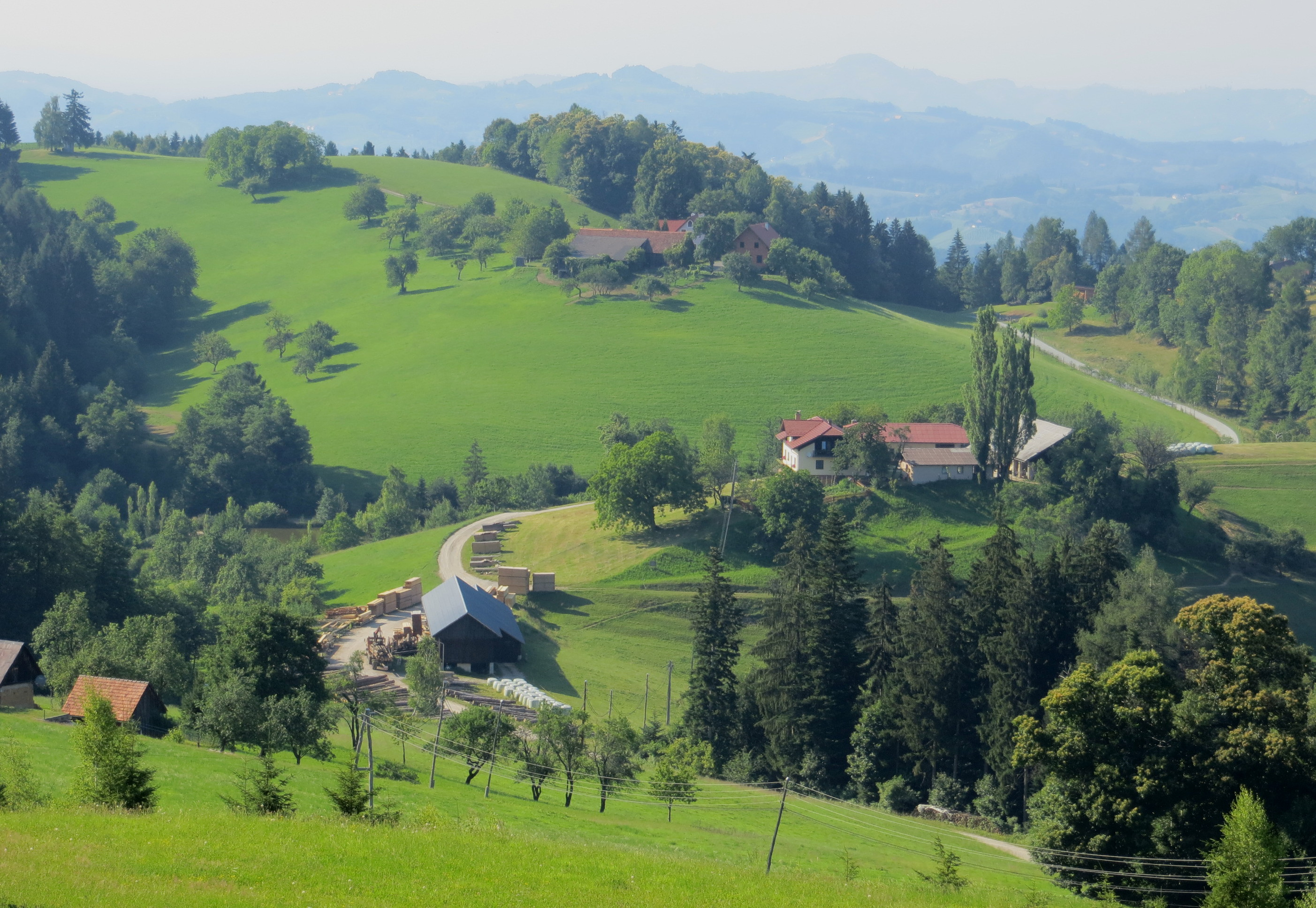
- The hamlet of Šelovo in Veliki Boč
- Interactive map of Veliki Boč
- Location in Slovenia
- Coordinates: 46°36′14.8″N 15°29′9.6″E
- Country: Slovenia
- Traditional region: Styria
- Statistical region: Drava
- Municipality: Selnica ob Dravi

Area
  - Total: 4.39 km^{2} (1.69 sq mi)
- Elevation: 901.4 m (2,957 ft)

Population (2002)
  - Total: 100

Veliki Boč (pronounced [ˈʋeːliki ˈboːtʃ]; German: Großwalz) is a dispersed settlement in the hills north of Selnica ob Dravi in northeastern Slovenia, right on the border with Austria.

== Geography ==
Veliki Boč consists of a number of large, isolated farms scattered across ridges of the Kojzak Hills. It extends north to the border with Austria, south to Spodnji Boč, east to Zgornji Slemen, and west to Zgornji Boč. The soil is composed of fertile weathered gneiss, tonalite, and phyllite. Tilled fields lie on the sunny sides of the slopes. Because the terrain limits the ability to cultivate the land, animal husbandry (cattle, sheep, and bees), and especially forestry, have traditionally been important.

== Name ==
The name Veliki Boč literally means 'big Boč', distinguishing the settlement from neighboring Zgornji Boč (literally, 'upper Boč') and Spodnji Boč (literally, 'lower Boč'). The name Boč may be geographical in origin, referring to a rounded hill. These various villages named Boč were attested in written sources in 1265–67 as Waltz (and as Walsnich in 1352).

== History ==
On April 25, 1929, the Yugoslav police executed Communist Party secretary Đuro Đaković (1886–1929) and Nikola Hećimović (1900–1929), secretary of International Red Aid, in the Šele Ravine (Slovene: Šelova graba) in the hamlet of Šelovo in the northern part of the village.
