= List of cities, towns, and villages in Slovenia: F =

This is a list of cities, towns, and villages in Slovenia, starting with F.

Settlement	Municipality
Fabci	Ilirska Bistrica
Fala	Ruše
Fala	Selnica ob Dravi
Famlje	Divača
Fara	Bloke
Fara	Kostel
Farovec	Slovenska Bistrica
Fijeroga	Koper
Fikšinci	Rogašovci
Filipčje Brdo	Sežana
Filovci	Moravske Toplice
Finkovo	Ribnica
Flekušek	Pesnica
Florjan nad Zmincem	Škofja Loka
Florjan pri Gornjem Gradu	Gornji Grad
Florjan	Šoštanj
Fojana	Brda
Fokovci	Moravske Toplice
Forme	Škofja Loka
Formin	Gorišnica
Fošt	Slovenska Bistrica
Frajhajm	Slovenska Bistrica
Fram	Rače-Fram
Frankolovo	Vojnik
Frankovci	Ormož
Frluga	Krško
Froleh	Sveta Ana (občina)
Fučkovci	Črnomelj
Fužina	Ivančna Gorica
Fužine	Gorenja vas-Poljane
