= Falla =

Falla may refer to:

== Places ==
- Falla (Chambas), a village in Ciego de Ávila Province, Cuba
- Falla, Östergötland, a village in Östergötland County, Sweden
- Mount Falla, a mountain in Antarctica

== Other uses ==
- Falles (or Fallas), Valencian traditional celebration
  - Falla monument, the artifact burnt during this celebration

== People with the name ==
- Alejandro Falla (born 1983), Colombian tennis player
- Emilio Falla (born 1986), Ecuadorian racing cyclist
- Luis Falla, Peruvian politician
- Maiken Caspersen Falla (born 1990), Norwegian cross-country skier
- Manuel de Falla (1876–1946), Spanish composer
- Norris Stephen Falla (1883–1945), New Zealand manager, military leader and aviation promoter
- Robert Falla (1901–1979), New Zealand scientist
- Simon Falla (born 1955), British Royal Air Force officer
- Wayne Falla (born 1970), English cricketer
- Falla N'Doye (born 1960), Senegalese football referee

== See also ==
- Fallah, a farmer or agricultural laborer in the Middle East
- Fella (disambiguation)
- Fala (disambiguation)
