= Log, Ruše =

Log
- Location in Slovenia
- Coordinates: 46°31′59.67″N 15°32′25.36″E
- Country: Slovenia
- Traditional region: Styria
- Statistical region: Drava
- Municipality: Ruše

Area
  - Total: 6.11 km^{2} (2.36 sq mi)
- Elevation: 385.4 m (1,264 ft)

Population (2002)
  - Total: 305

Log (pronounced [ˈloːk]) is a settlement in the Municipality of Ruše in northeastern Slovenia. It lies in a valley of a small right tributary of the Drava River in the Pohorje Hills south of Bistrica ob Dravi. The area is part of the traditional region of Styria. The municipality is now included in the Drava Statistical Region.

== History ==
In 1992, Log annexed the settlement of Vrhov Dol (adjacent to Vrhov Dol in the Municipality of Maribor), ending its existence as a separate settlement.
