= Zgornja Selnica =

- Location in Slovenia
- Coordinates: 46°33′23.05″N 15°30′44.78″E
- Country: Slovenia
- Traditional region: Styria
- Statistical region: Drava
- Municipality: Selnica ob Dravi

Area
  - Total: 1.51 km^{2} (0.58 sq mi)
- Elevation: 287.2 m (942 ft)

Population (2002)
  - Total: 442

Zgornja Selnica (pronounced [ˈzɡoːɾnja ˈseːlnica]) is a settlement immediately north of Selnica ob Dravi in northeastern Slovenia.
