= Črešnjevec ob Dravi =

- Location in Slovenia
- Coordinates: 46°32′51.67″N 15°28′6.28″E
- Country: Slovenia
- Traditional region: Styria
- Statistical region: Drava
- Municipality: Selnica ob Dravi

Area
  - Total: 2.99 km^{2} (1.15 sq mi)
- Elevation: 319.7 m (1,049 ft)

Population (2002)
  - Total: 255

Črešnjevec ob Dravi (pronounced [ˈtʃɾeːʃnjɛʋəts ɔb ˈdɾaːʋi]) is a small settlement on the left bank of the Drava River in the Municipality of Selnica ob Dravi in Slovenia.
