= Zgornji Slemen, Selnica ob Dravi =

Zgornji Slemen
- Location in Slovenia
- Coordinates: 46°35′57.88″N 15°30′41.07″E
- Country: Slovenia
- Traditional region: Styria
- Statistical region: Drava
- Municipality: Selnica ob Dravi

Area
  - Total: 4.4 km^{2} (1.7 sq mi)
- Elevation: 850.8 m (2,791 ft)

Population (2002)
  - Total: 105
- The statistics on this page refer only to the part of Zgornji Slemen that lies in the Municipality of Selnica ob Dravi.

Zgornji Slemen (pronounced [ˈzɡoːɾnji ˈsleːmɛn]) is a settlement in the hills above Selnica in northeastern Slovenia. Part of the settlement is in the Municipality of Selnica ob Dravi and the remainder belongs to the City Municipality of Maribor.
