= Spodnja Selnica =

- Location in Slovenia
- Coordinates: 46°33′18.16″N 15°30′51.77″E
- Country: Slovenia
- Traditional region: Styria
- Statistical region: Drava
- Municipality: Selnica ob Dravi

Area
  - Total: 0.65 km^{2} (0.25 sq mi)
- Elevation: 280.7 m (921 ft)

Population (2002)
  - Total: 137

Spodnja Selnica (pronounced [ˈspoːdnja ˈseːlnica]) is a settlement on the left bank of the Drava River in the Municipality of Selnica ob Dravi in Slovenia.
