= Tolčane =

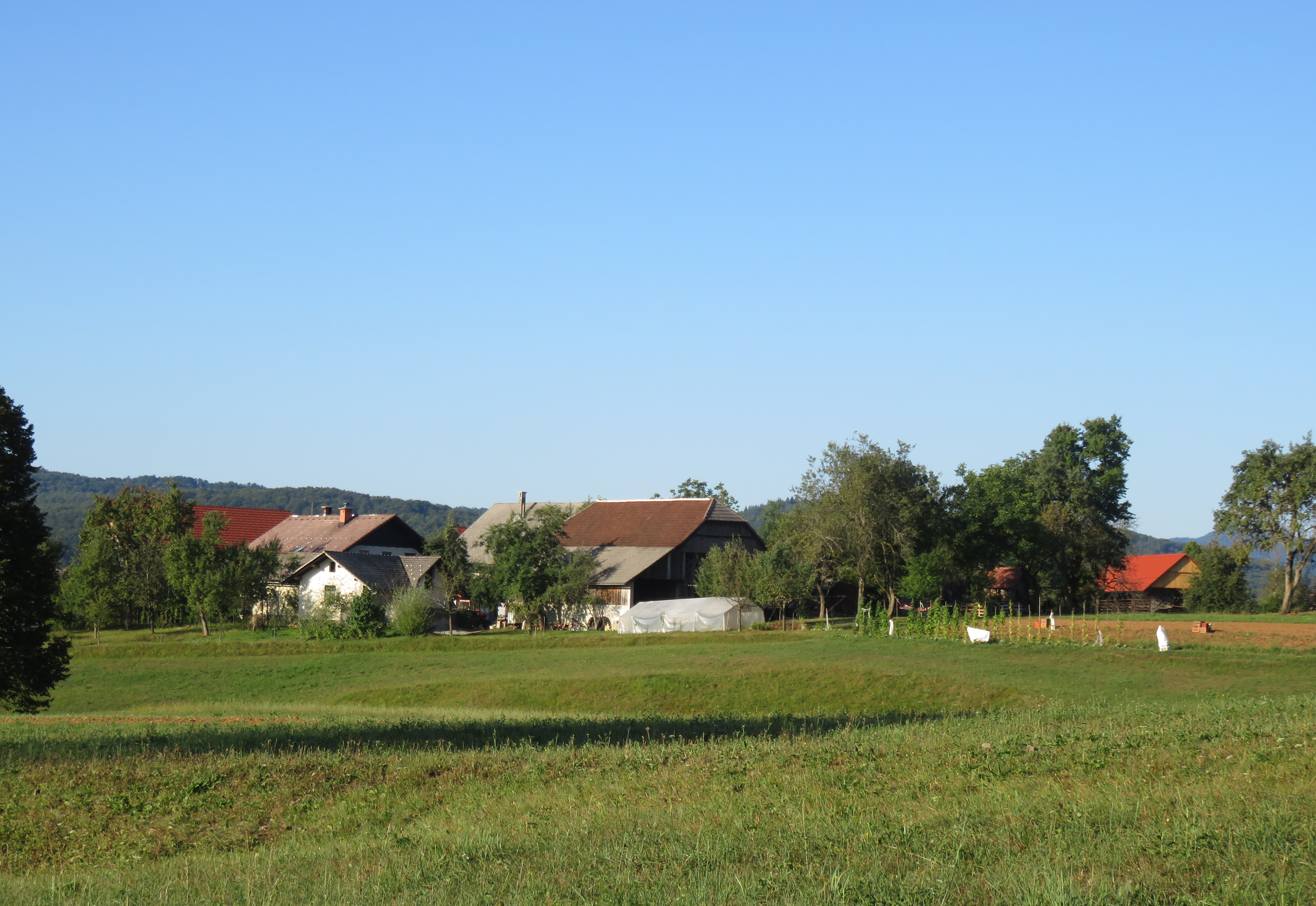

- Location in Slovenia
- Coordinates: 45°52′2.18″N 14°51′0.24″E
- Country: Slovenia
- Traditional region: Lower Carniola
- Statistical region: Central Slovenia
- Municipality: Ivančna Gorica

Area
  - Total: 2.64 km^{2} (1.02 sq mi)
- Elevation: 352.3 m (1,156 ft)

Population (2002)
  - Total: 42

Tolčane (pronounced [tɔu̯ˈtʃaːnɛ]) is a small village northeast of Fužina in the Municipality of Ivančna Gorica in central Slovenia. The area is part of the historical region of Lower Carniola and is included in the Central Slovenia Statistical Region.
