= Vurmat =

- Location in Slovenia
- Coordinates: 46°34′36.74″N 15°24′45.22″E
- Country: Slovenia
- Traditional region: Styria
- Statistical region: Carinthia, Drava
- Municipality: Podvelka, Selnica ob Dravi

Area
  - Total: 15.57 km^{2} (6.01 sq mi)

Population (2012)
  - Total: 196

Vurmat (pronounced [ˈʋuːɾmat]) is a dispersed settlement in the hills above the left bank of the Drava River in northeastern Slovenia. The main part of the settlement is in the Municipality of Podvelka and the remainder belongs to the Municipality of Selnica ob Dravi.
