= Gradišče na Kozjaku =

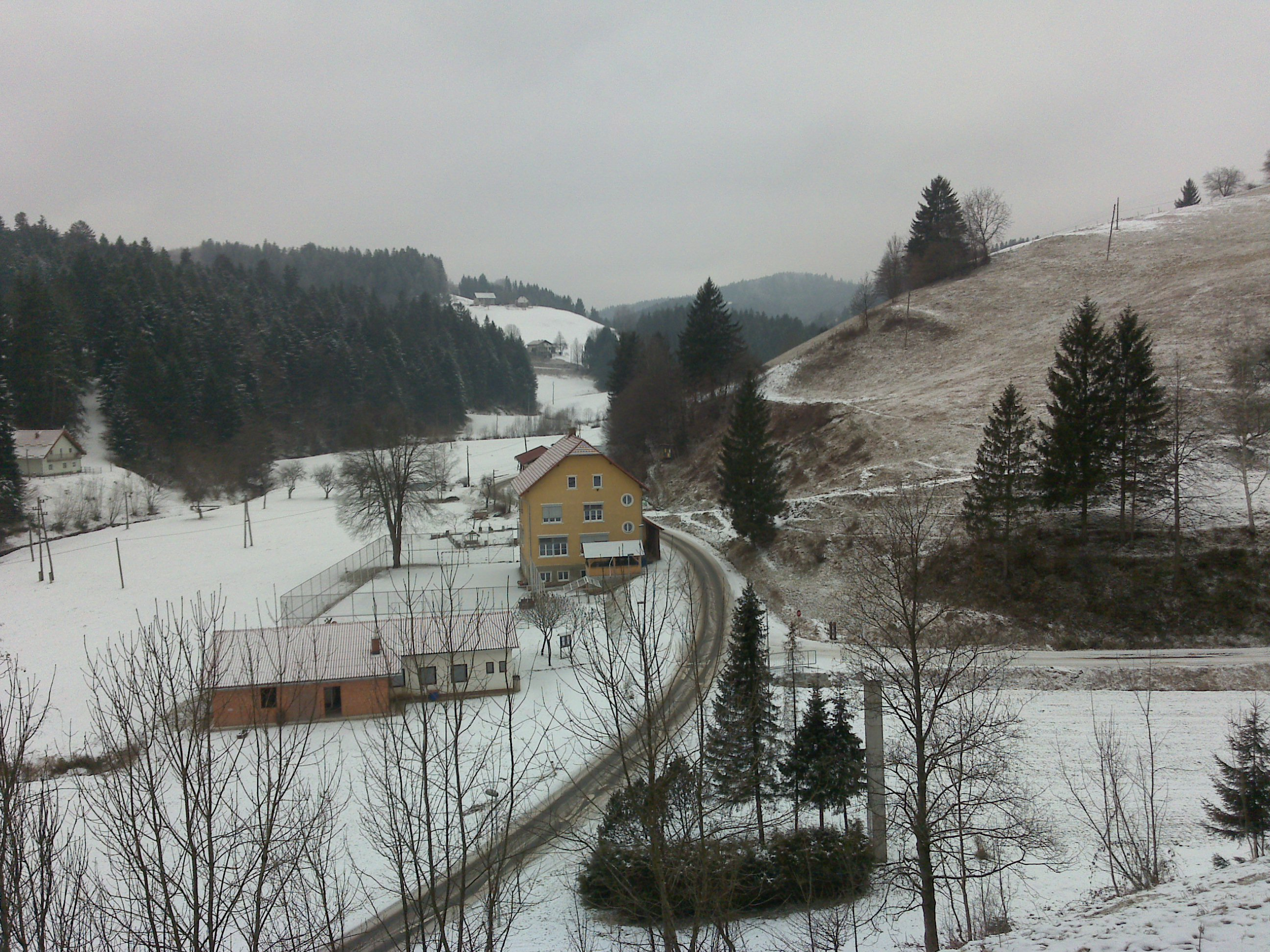

- Location in Slovenia
- Coordinates: 46°37′54.13″N 15°26′56.49″E
- Country: Slovenia
- Traditional region: Styria
- Statistical region: Drava
- Municipality: Selnica ob Dravi

Area
  - Total: 6.9 km^{2} (2.7 sq mi)
- Elevation: 534.9 m (1,755 ft)

Population (2002)
  - Total: 194

Gradišče na Kozjaku (pronounced [ɡɾaˈdiːʃtʃɛ na kɔˈzjaːku]) is a dispersed settlement in the Municipality of Selnica ob Dravi in Slovenia, right on the border with Austria.

== Name ==
The name of the settlement was changed from Gradišče to Gradišče na Kozjaku in 1953.
