= Lobnica, Ruše =

Lobnica
- Location in Slovenia
- Coordinates: 46°31′55.13″N 15°31′23.42″E
- Country: Slovenia
- Traditional region: Styria
- Statistical region: Drava
- Municipality: Ruše

Area
  - Total: 12 km^{2} (4.6 sq mi)
- Elevation: 481.6 m (1,580 ft)

Population (2002)
  - Total: 182

Lobnica (pronounced [lɔbˈniːtsa]) is a settlement in the Municipality of Ruše in northeastern Slovenia. It lies in the Pohorje Hills south of Ruše. The area is part of the traditional region of Styria. The municipality is now included in the Drava Statistical Region.

== Mass graves ==
Lobnica is the site of 15 known mass graves from the period immediately after the Second World War. The Ruše Lodge at Areh 2–16 mass graves (Slovene: Grobišče pri Ruški koči na Arehu 2–16) are located east of Saint Henry's Church in Frajhajm, along a gravel road towards Mount Sedovec. They contain the remains of civilian victims and prisoners of war that were brought from Maribor and the surrounding region and murdered in May and June 1945. The remains of 190 victims were exhumed from the Ruše Lodge at Areh 3 Mass Grave in 2006 and reinterred in an ossuary in the Dobrava Cemetery in southeast Maribor. The Ruše Lodge at Areh 6 Mass Grave is located on the north side of the dirt road in forest section 93. Sounding carried out in August 2007 failed to confirm remains at the Ruše Lodge at Areh 16 Mass Grave.

== Notable people ==
Notable people that were born or lived in Lobnica include:

- Alfonz Šarh (1893–1943), Slovene Partisan and People's Hero of Yugoslavia
