= Fala =

Fala may refer to:

== Places ==
- Fala, Midlothian, Scotland
- Fala, Ruše, Slovenia
- Fala, Selnica ob Dravi, Slovenia
- Fálá, Northern Sami-language name for Kvaløya, Finnmark, Norway

== Languages ==
- Fala language, a Romance language from the Portuguese-Galician subgroup spoken in Spain
- Fala de Guine, or fala de negros, the language spoken by Atlantic Creoles

== Other ==
- Fala, a traditional percussion instrument used in the music of Samoa
- FALA, armed wing of UNITA, Angolan rebel movement
- FALA, or the Flagstaff Arts and Leadership Academy in Arizona
- FALA, ICAO code of Lanseria International Airport
- Fala (album), a 1985 Polish punk rock/reggae/new wave compilation album
- Fala (dog), Scottish Terrier owned by Franklin D. Roosevelt
- Fala (moth), a genus of moths
- Max Fala, Samoan rugby player
- ORP Fala, ship that served the Polish Navy then Polish Border Guard
