= Spodnji Slemen =

Spodnji Slemen Slemen (until 1952)
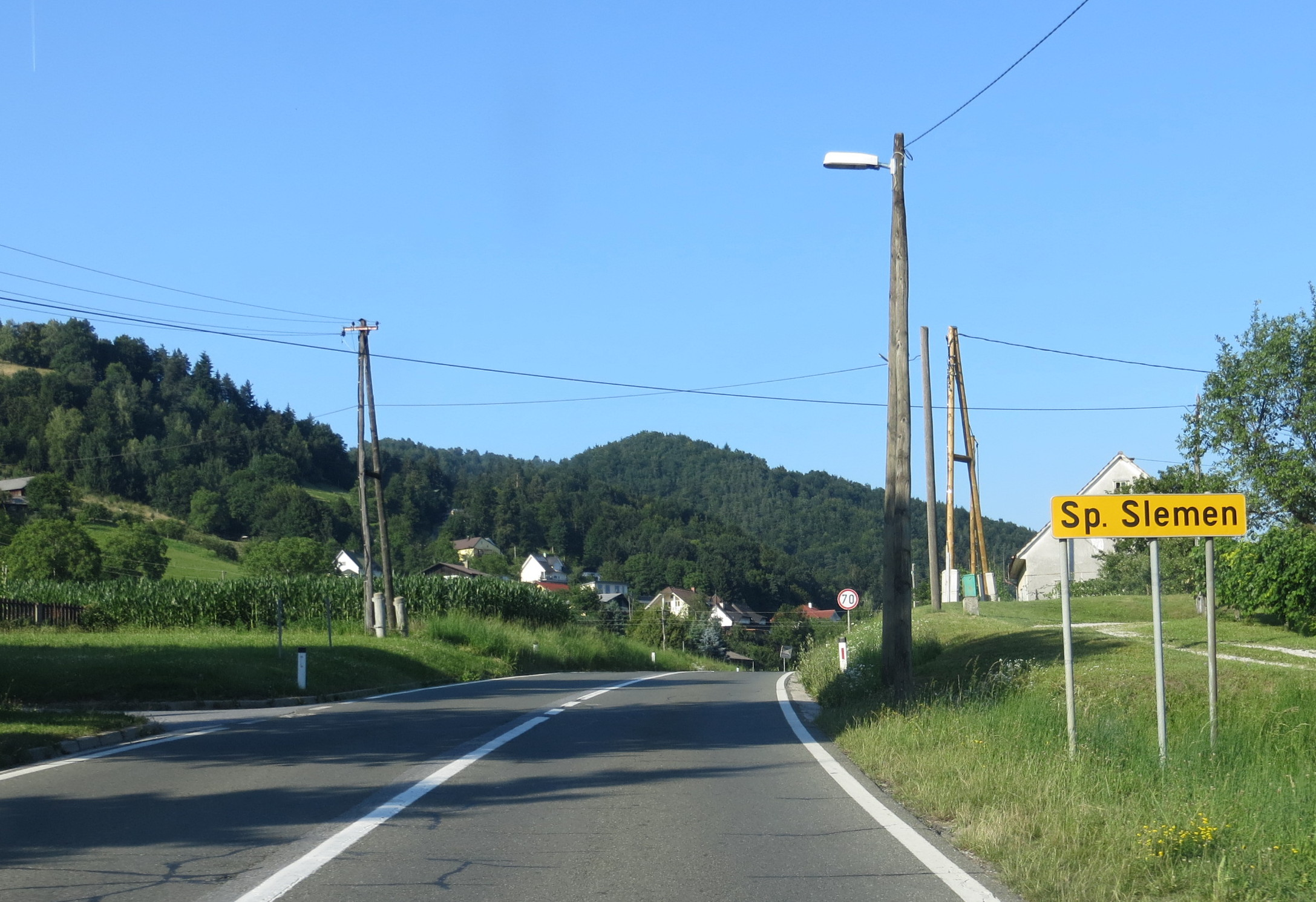

- Location in Slovenia
- Coordinates: 46°33′35.55″N 15°31′36.55″E
- Country: Slovenia
- Traditional region: Styria
- Statistical region: Drava
- Municipality: Selnica ob Dravi

Area
  - Total: 11.06 km^{2} (4.27 sq mi)
- Elevation: 286.1 m (939 ft)

Population (2002)
  - Total: 645

Spodnji Slemen (pronounced [ˈspoːdnji ˈsleːmɛn]) is a dispersed settlement in the hills above the left bank of the Drava River in the Municipality of Selnica ob Dravi in northeastern Slovenia.

== Name ==
The name of the settlement was changed from Slemen to Spodnji Slemen in 1952.

== Viltuš Manor ==
Viltuš Manor (Slovene: Grad Viltuš) is an originally 17th-century manor house refurbished in 1885 that stands in a park above the left bank of the Drava River in the southern part of the settlement.
