= Zinka Zorko =

Slovene linguist and academic (1936–2019)

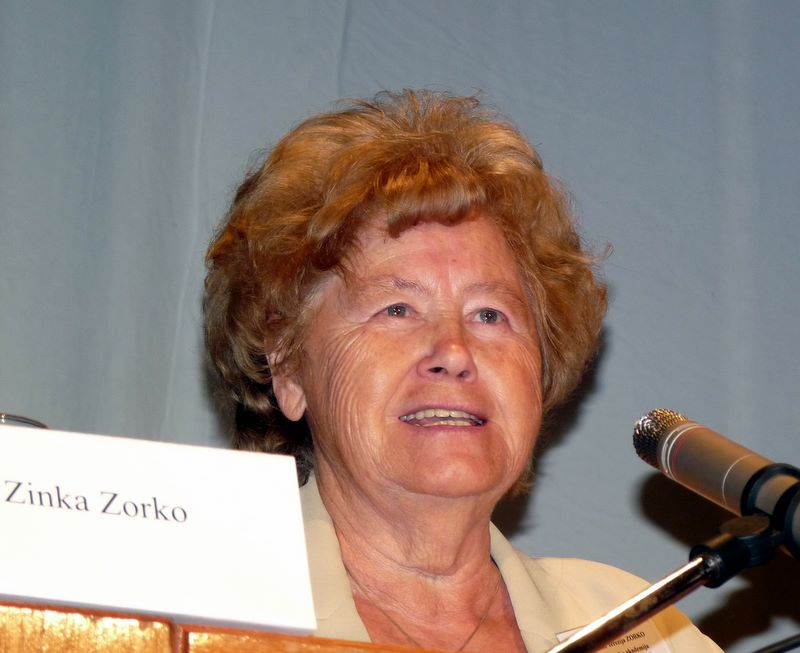
- Zorko in 2008
- Born: February 24, 1936; Spodnja Kapla, Yugoslavia
- Died: March 22, 2019 (aged 83); Selnica ob Dravi, Slovenia

Academic background
- Education: University of Ljubljana
- Thesis: Koroški govori dravskega obmejnega hribovja od Ojstrice do Duha na Ostrem vrhu (1986)

Academic work
- Discipline: Linguist

Zinka Zorko (February 24, 1936 – March 22, 2019) was a Slovenian linguist and academic. Her research focused on phonetic, theological, syntactic, and vocabulary phenomena of Carinthian, Styrian, and Pannonian dialect groups. In 2003, she was elected a full member of the Slovenian Academy of Sciences and Arts, and a decade later, she received the Zois Lifetime Achievement Award.

== Biography ==
Terezija ("Zinka") Lep was born in Spodnja Kapla on February 24, 1936. She graduated from the Faculty of Arts at the University of Ljubljana in 1961 in Slovene and Russian languages as well as Slovene and Russian literature. There, she received her PhD in 1986 with the dissertation, Koroški govori dravskega obmejnega hribovja od Ojstrice do Duha na Ostrem vrhu (Carinthian Dialects of the Border Drava Hills from Ojstrica to Sveti Duh na Ostrem Vrhu).

Zorko initially taught at secondary schools in Ravne na Koroškem. From 1961, she worked at the Pedagogy Faculty of University of Maribor, after 1996 as a full professor of history and dialectology of Slovene. From 1986 to 1996, she also taught at the Faculty of Arts, University of Ljubljana. The University of Maribor awarded her the title of Honorary Professor upon her retirement.

Zorko studied dialects and their social role, especially from Carinthia and Eastern Slovenia. In Carinthia, she devoted particular attention to the dialect in the works of Prežihov Voranc, specifically in his Jamnico, Samorastnike, and Solzice. Zorko dealt with multilingual intertwining primarily with German and Hungarian, and analyzed eastern Slovene dialects in comparison with standard Slovene. She was the author of several textbooks and a mentor to teachers in neighboring countries. In 1996 and 1999, she organized two international dialectological symposia. In 2003, the Slovenian Academy of Sciences and Arts elected her member extraordinary and in 2009, a full member.

In 2013, she received the Zois Lifetime Achievement Award (Zoisova nagrada) for research on the phonology, morphology, syntax, and vocabulary of the Carinthian, Styrian, and Pannonian dialect groups.

She died in Selnica ob Dravi on March 22, 2019.

== Awards ==
- 2013, Zoisova nagrada (Zois Lifetime Achievement Award)
