= Eliza Frančiška Grizold =

Slovenian teacher, poet and composer (1847–1913)

- Born: Eliza Grizold; November 7, 1847; Smolnik, Ruše, Austrian Empire
- Died: April 2, 1913 (aged 65); Graz, Austria-Hungary
- Occupations: teacher, poet, composer, organist

Eliza Grizold, Sister Marija Frančiška of the Five Wounds, (7 November 1847 – 2 April 1913) was a Slovenian teacher, poet, and composer. Member of the School Sisters of the Third Order of St Francis, she spent most of her working life teaching music and leading girls' education in the Maribor area, and is remembered for devotional poetry and church songs, including works she composed to accompany her own texts.

== Childhood and education ==
She was born on 7 November 1847 into a Slovenian family in Smolnik and was baptised the same day. (Note: In the baptismal register she is recorded as Elisabeth Griſold, in the death register as Elisa Franziska Grisold, and on her father’s obituary notice as Eliza Grizolt.) Her mother was the farmer Marija Glaser (1816–1895), the half-sister of the priest and writer Marko Glaser and her father was the farmer and patriot Davorin Grizold (1817–1871). Her family was devout and nationally conscious. Her mother was a Franciscan tertiary. Soon after her birth, her father became strongly committed to the Slovene language and founded a reading society in Ruše. At the age of nineteen she became a member of the Society of Saint Hermagoras (Družba svetega Mohorja), of which both her parents were also members. In 1868 she entered the Congregation of the School Sisters of the Third Order of St Francis in the Eggenberg district of Graz, where she trained as a teacher. In the same year her uncle Marko Glaser, then serving in the parish of Malečnik, invited the School Sisters from Eggenberg to Malečnik; they founded a girls’ school there and organised courses in which they trained girls to become cooks, seamstresses, and maidservants. Eliza Frančiška likewise went to Malečnik in 1869 as a novice.

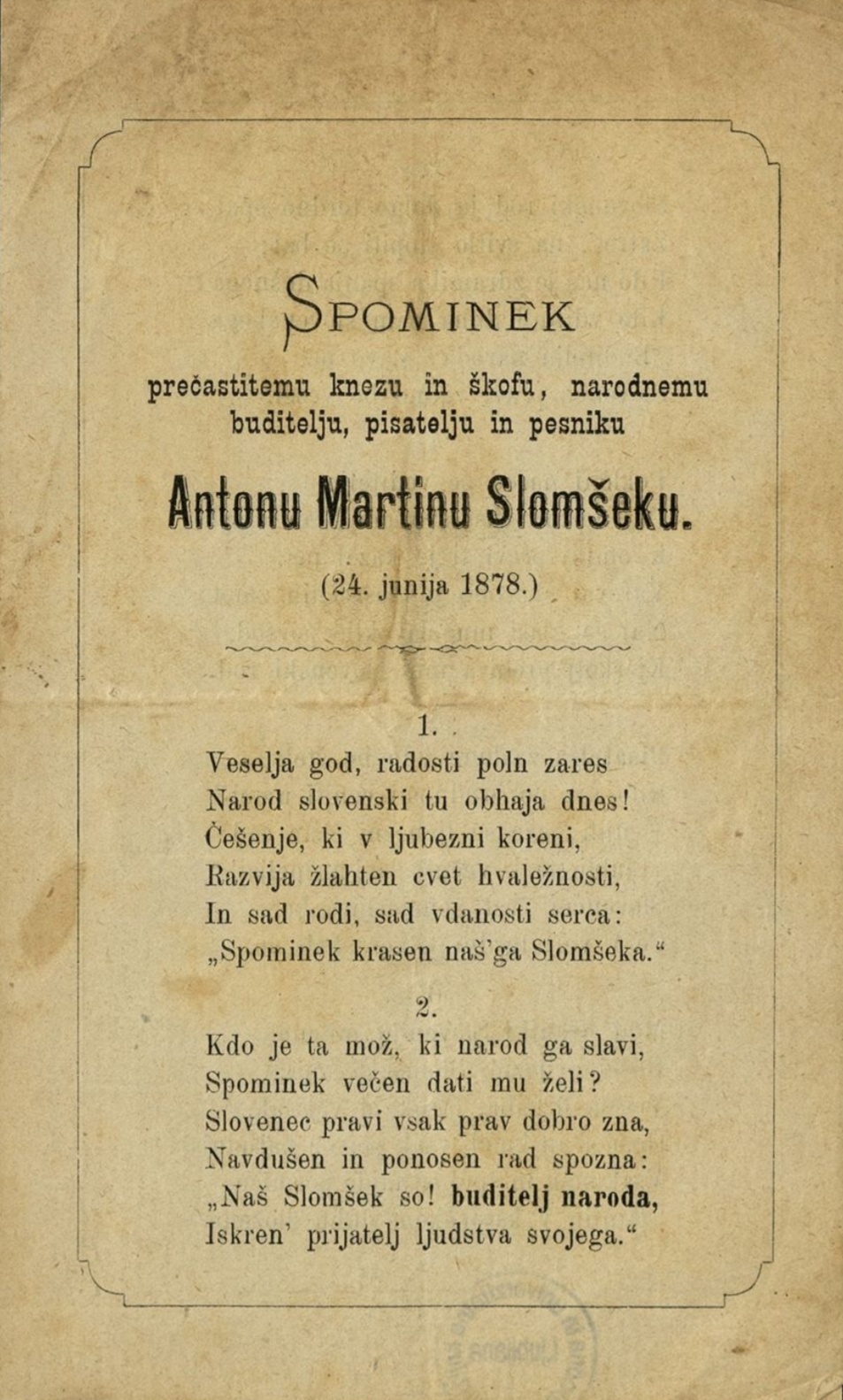
Front page of her booklet Spominek prečastitemu knezu, škofu, narodnemu buditelju, pisatelju in pesniku Antonu Martinu Slomšeku (A Memento to the Most Reverend Prince, Bishop, National Awakener, Writer and Poet Anton Martin Slomšek).

== Career ==
=== Educational work ===
After completing her education she was employed as a teacher of music and singing and as a first-grade teacher at the girls' vocational school in Maribor, where she worked until retirement. (Note: In teacher lists she is sometimes entered as Sister Elizabeta Grizold, and at other times as Sister Frančiška Grizold.) The school, where girls were taught in Slovene and German, was attended primarily by girls from farming and working-class backgrounds. In addition, from 1879 (and at least until 1892) she also worked as an assistant teacher at the three-grade school in Sveti Peter pri Mariboru. In 1888, she became superior of the School Sisters at Sveti Peter and principal of the girls' vocational school. Under her leadership, a four-grade girls' school was built in Luče in 1893. The teachers there were School Sisters from Graz under her direction.

=== Literary and musical work ===
She began writing poetry before 1874. Her pupils recited her poems at school celebrations. In 1878, for the unveiling of a monument to Anton Martin Slomšek in Maribor, she composed a poem titled Spominek prečastitemu knezu, škofu, narodnemu buditelju, pisatelju in pesniku Antonu Martinu Slomšeku (A Memento to the Most Reverend Prince, Bishop, National Awakener, Writer and Poet Anton Martin Slomšek), which she also read aloud at the unveiling ceremony. Marko Glaser, then an honorary canon in Maribor, had it printed as a booklet and distributed among the people. She wrote several other poems, which were published in Zgodnja Danica, Naš dom, Slovenski gospodar, and others. (Note: In publications of her works, or articles about them, she is given as Frančiška Grizold, Frančiška Grizoldova, Fr. Grizoldova, M. Frančiška Grizold, or simply Grizoldova, sometimes with the title “sister” (s.) before the name.) In her poems she expressed great devotion to the Sacred Heart of Jesus and to the Eucharist. She wrote primarily church hymns, but also patriotic poems.

Before 1879, she also began composing music. She set a number of her poems to music, mainly church songs. She wrote and set to music the song Slovenka sem (I am a Slovene woman), a girls' version of the popular Slovenian song Slovenec sem (I am a Slovene man). For several years she served as organist at the Church of St Peter near Maribor.

== Later life and death ==
After retiring, she worked in the convent at Sveti Peter as a teacher of novices. After 1909 she moved to the School Sisters' convent in the Eggenberg district of Graz. She died of marasmus and pneumonia on 2 April 1913 in Graz.

== Bibliography ==
- Spominek prečastitemu knezu, škofu, narodnemu buditelju, pisatelju in pesniku Antonu Martinu Slomšeku (A Memento to the Most Reverend Prince, Bishop, National Awakener, Writer and Poet Anton Martin Slomšek) (1878)
