= Bezena =

- Location in Slovenia
- Coordinates: 46°32′45.1″N 15°32′7.51″E
- Country: Slovenia
- Traditional region: Styria
- Statistical region: Drava
- Municipality: Ruše

Area
  - Total: 2.36 km^{2} (0.91 sq mi)
- Elevation: 300 m (980 ft)

Population (2002)
  - Total: 480

Bezena (pronounced [bɛˈzeːna]) is a settlement on the right bank of the Drava River in the Municipality of Ruše in northeastern Slovenia. The area is part of the traditional region of Styria. The municipality is now included in the Drava Statistical Region.

The village chapel-shrine dates to the late 18th century.
