= Spodnji Boč =

- Location in Slovenia
- Coordinates: 46°34′58.59″N 15°29′39.49″E
- Country: Slovenia
- Traditional region: Styria
- Statistical region: Drava
- Municipality: Selnica ob Dravi

Area
  - Total: 6.07 km^{2} (2.34 sq mi)
- Elevation: 684.8 m (2,247 ft)

Population (2002)
  - Total: 203

Spodnji Boč (pronounced [ˈspoːdnji ˈboːtʃ]) is a dispersed settlement in the hills above Selnica ob Dravi in northeastern Slovenia.
