= Janževa Gora =

- Location in Slovenia
- Coordinates: 46°33′10.75″N 15°28′11.61″E
- Country: Slovenia
- Traditional region: Styria
- Statistical region: Drava
- Municipality: Selnica ob Dravi

Area
  - Total: 1.74 km^{2} (0.67 sq mi)
- Elevation: 356.9 m (1,171 ft)

Population (2002)
  - Total: 444

Janževa Gora (pronounced [ˈjaːnʒɛʋa ˈɡɔːɾa], in older sources also Janževska Gora, German: Johannesberg) is a small settlement in the hills above the left bank of the Drava River in the Municipality of Selnica ob Dravi in Slovenia.

The local church, from which the settlement also gets its name, is dedicated to John the Baptist (Janž in the local dialect) and belongs to the Parish of Selnica ob Dravi. It is a single-nave, originally 15th-century building with 17th-century rebuilding and additions. The internal furnishings are Baroque.
