= Smolnik, Ruše =

Smolnik
- Location in Slovenia
- Coordinates: 46°32′1.82″N 15°29′15.78″E
- Country: Slovenia
- Traditional region: Styria
- Statistical region: Drava
- Municipality: Ruše

Area
  - Total: 32.31 km^{2} (12.47 sq mi)
- Elevation: 274.5 m (901 ft)

Population (2002)
  - Total: 345

Smolnik (pronounced [ˈsmoːu̯nik]) is a dispersed settlement in the Municipality of Ruše in northeastern Slovenia. It extends from the right bank of the Drava River just west of Ruše into the Pohorje Hills. The area is part of the traditional region of Styria. The municipality is now included in the Drava Statistical Region.

== Church ==
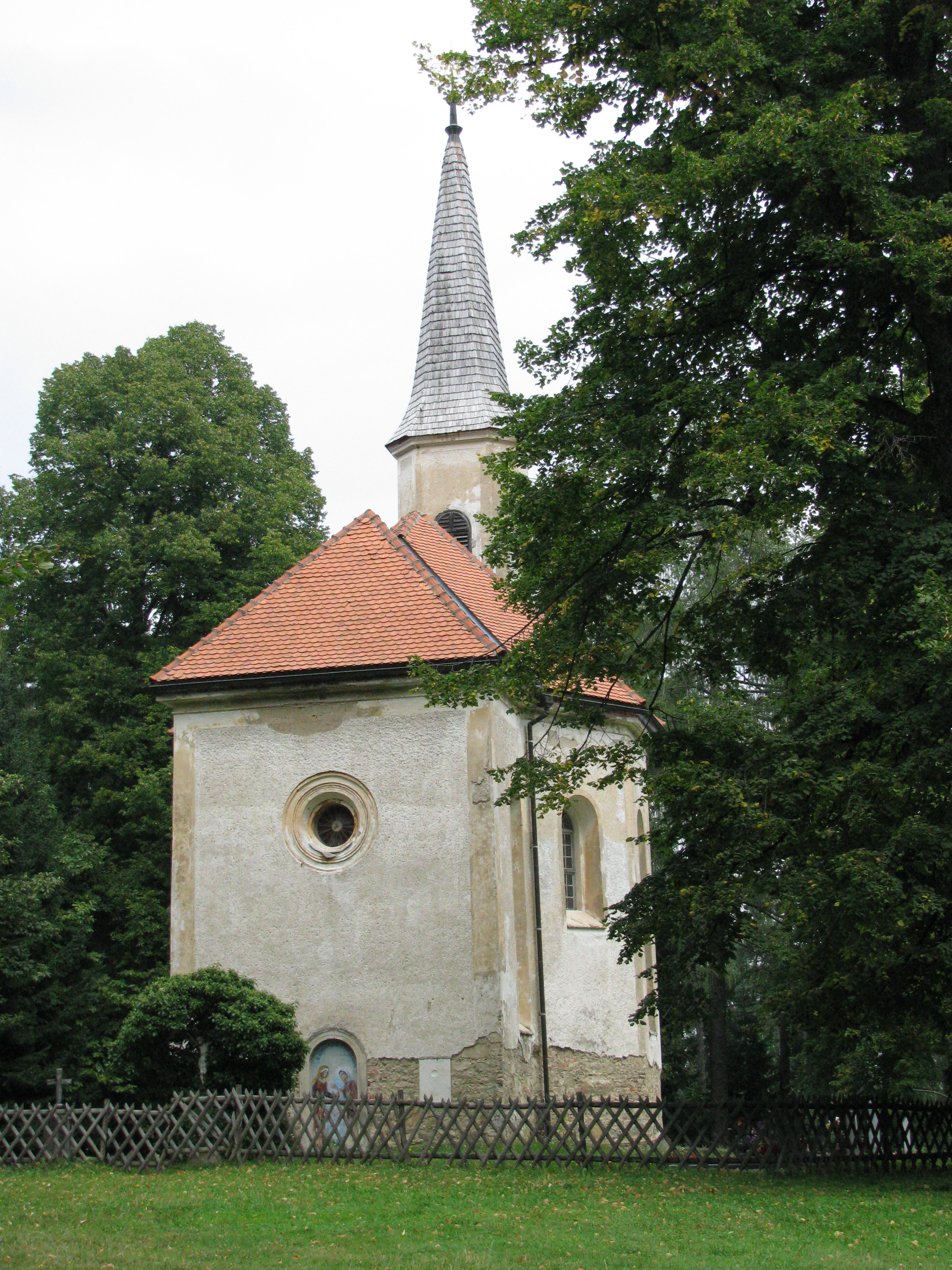
St. Mary's Church in Smolnik

The local church is dedicated to the Virgin Mary and belongs to the Parish of Ruše. It was built in the Baroque style between 1859 and 1861.

== Notable people ==
- Eliza Frančiška Grizold (1847–1913), Slovenian teacher, poet, and composer
