= Sveti Duh na Ostrem Vrhu =

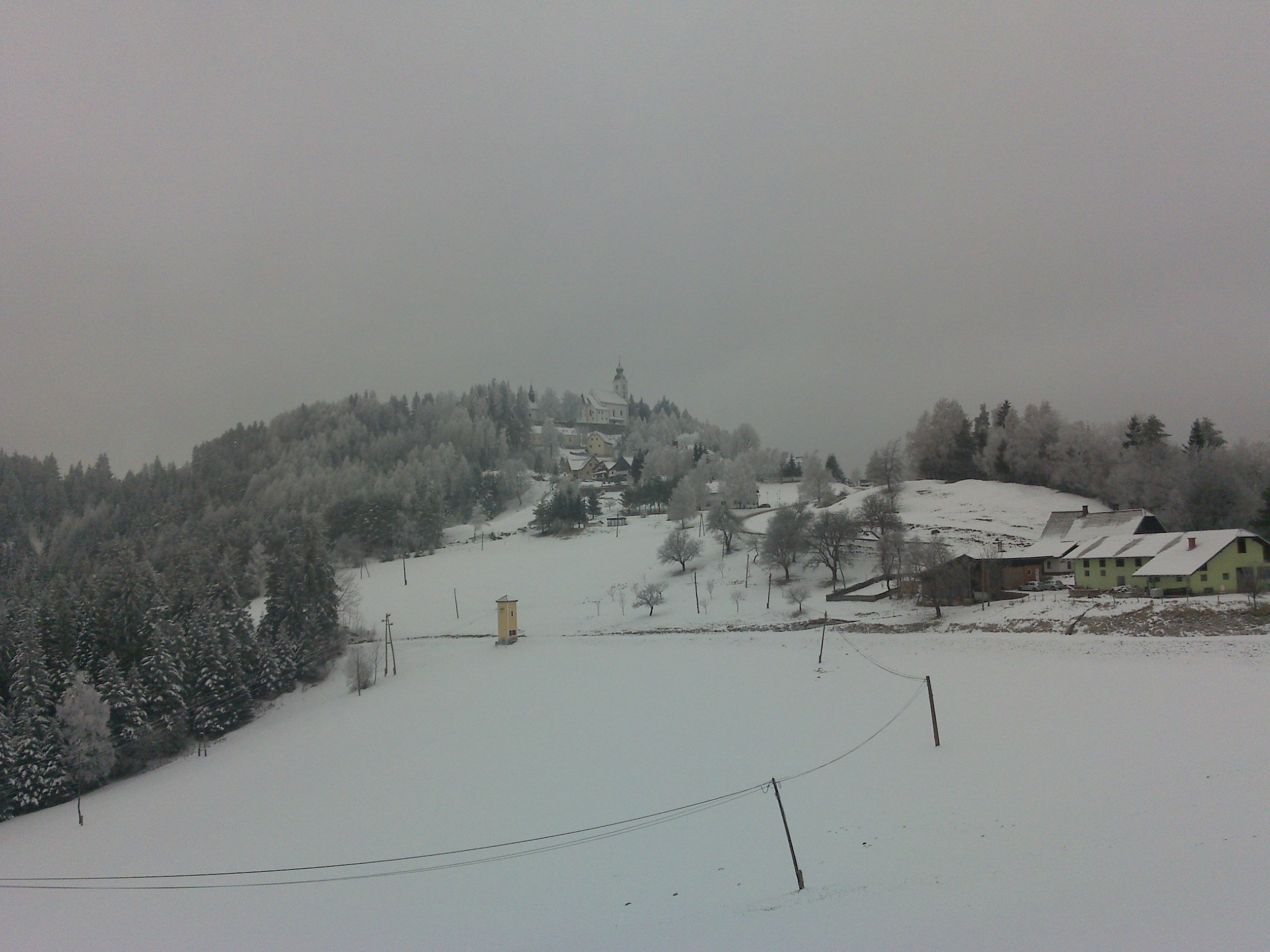

- Location in Slovenia
- Coordinates: 46°36′31.47″N 15°27′14.61″E
- Country: Slovenia
- Traditional region: Styria
- Statistical region: Drava
- Municipality: Selnica ob Dravi

Area
  - Total: 5.19 km^{2} (2.00 sq mi)
- Elevation: 907 m (2,976 ft)

Population (2002)
  - Total: 120

Sveti Duh na Ostrem Vrhu (pronounced [ˈsʋeːti ˈduːx na ˈoːstɾɛɱ ˈʋəɾxu]) is a dispersed settlement in the hills north of Selnica ob Dravi in northeastern Slovenia, right on the border with Austria.

It gets its name from the local parish church dedicated to the Holy Spirit (Slovene: Sveti Duh). It is a single-nave building with a belfry, dating to 1675. Right next to it is a second, smaller church, dedicated to Saint Augustine. It was built in 1693.
