= Fala, Ruše =

Fala Fala Grad (1994–1999), Faal
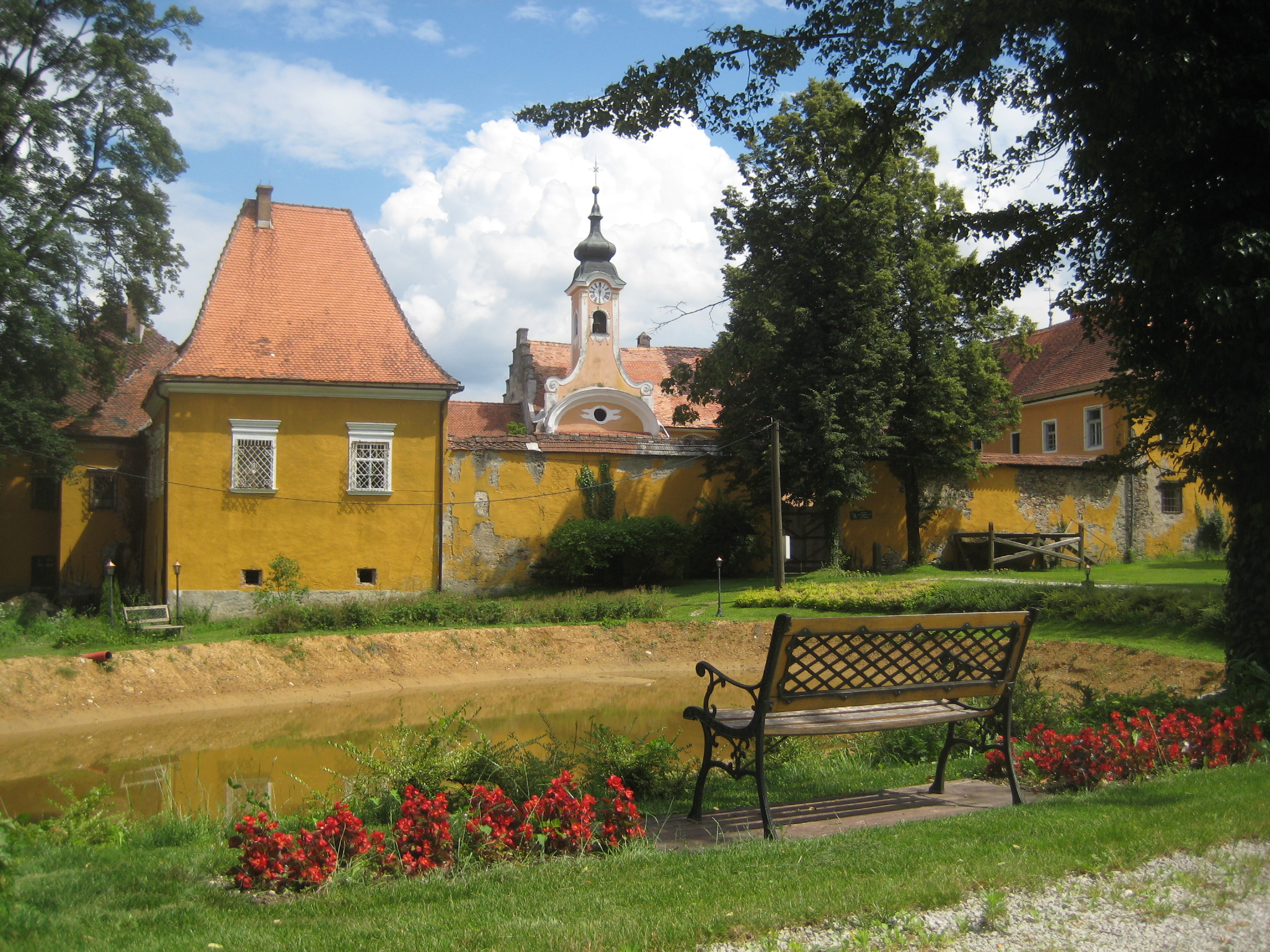

- Location in Slovenia
- Coordinates: 46°32′58.38″N 15°27′8.13″E
- Country: Slovenia
- Traditional region: Styria
- Statistical region: Drava
- Municipality: Ruše

Area
  - Total: 1.03 km^{2} (0.40 sq mi)
- Elevation: 305.8 m (1,003 ft)

Population (2002)
  - Total: 120

Fala (pronounced [ˈfaːla]) is a settlement on the Drava River in northeastern Slovenia. The part of the settlement on the right bank of the river belongs to the Municipality of Ruše. The part on the left bank of the river is included in the Municipality of Selnica ob Dravi. The area is part of the traditional region of Styria. The municipality is now included in the Drava Statistical Region.

== Name ==
Fala was mentioned in written sources in 1245 as in domo Volmari (and as de Valle in 1279, Vall and Valle in 1289, and Fall in 1495). The name is of unclear origin, although the initial F- indicates a German origin. It could be derived from Old High German falo 'yellowish' (referring to soil or water color) or from valle 'trap' (referring to hunting activity). Derivation from Latin vallis 'valley' is unlikely because the area was not under Romance influence. The settlement was known as Fala Grad from 1994 to 1999.

== History ==
South of the settlement, where the railroad enters a tunnel on the way to Ruše, there are the remains of a German bunker from the Second World War. During the war, Partisan forces dynamited the railroad line a number of times. On the night of 28 September 1944, the Partisans' Jože Lacko Detachment attacked the German post at the hydroelectric plant, killing 10 German troops and releasing a large quantity of oil into the Drava River.

Fala became a separate settlement in 1994, when it was separated from neighboring Fala in the Municipality of Selnica ob Dravi.

== Hydroelectric plant ==
The Fala hydroelectric power plant in the settlement was built between 1913 and 1918. As a technological and construction achievement of its time, the Slovenian Ministry of Culture included it in its register of monuments of national importance in 2008.

== Fala Castle ==
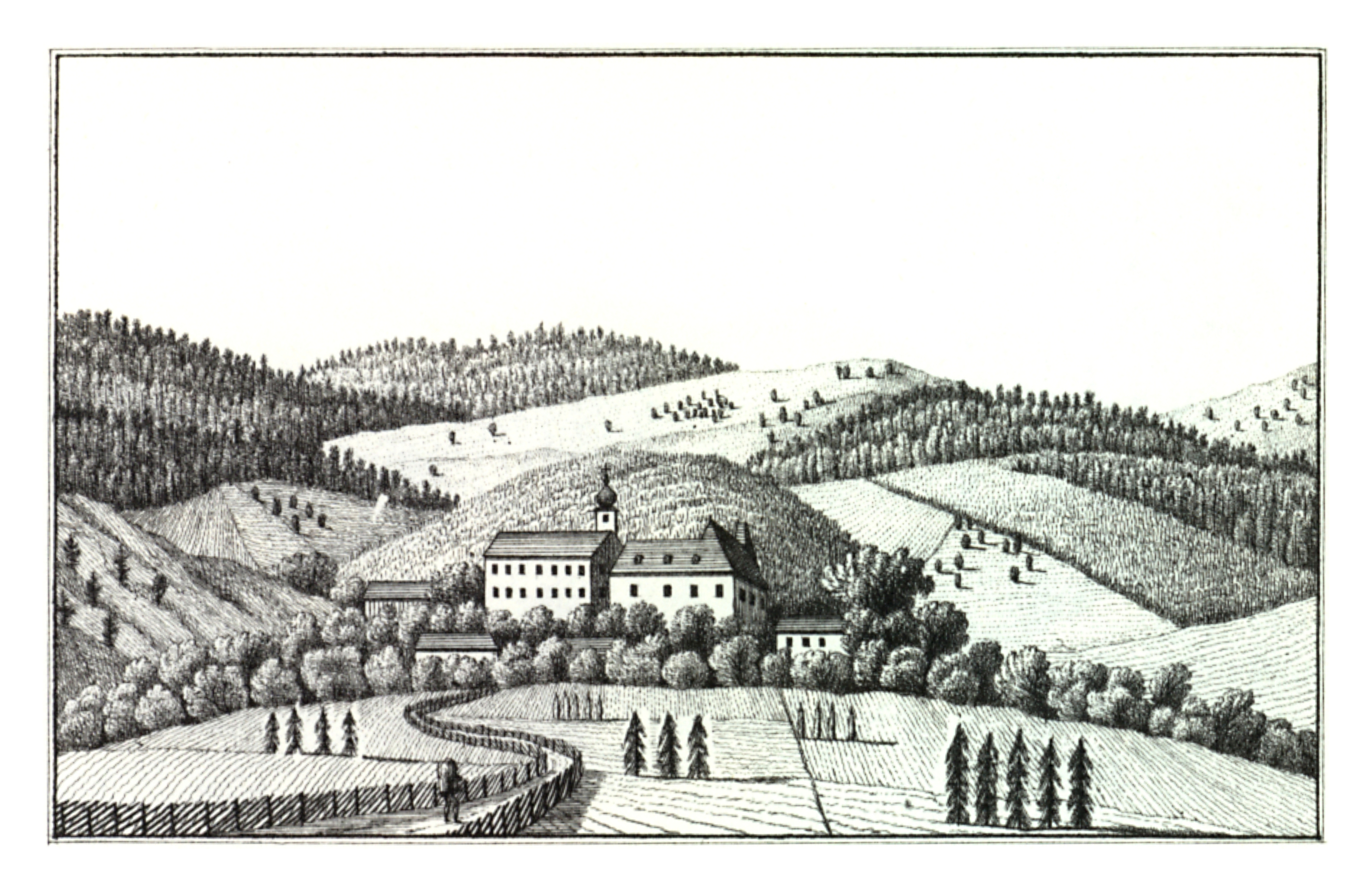
Fala Castle, 1830, lithography

Fala Castle is a castle on the right bank of the Drava River in the southern part of the settlement. It was first mentioned in written documents dating to 1245, but most of the current building, including the castle chapel, dates to the 16th and 17th century with major 19th-century reconstruction. The structure originally belonged to St. Paul's Abbey in the Lavant Valley. It was destroyed by Hungarian forces in 1259, and a new structure was built in 1290. The castle was additionally fortified in the 16th century due to the danger of Ottoman attacks. It was remodeled in the Baroque style in the 17th century, when it also housed a school for priests. The castle came under state ownership with the dissolution of the monastery in 1782, and was then purchased by the Liebmann von Rast family in 1822. A chapel dedicated to Saint Nicholas was part of the castle. The last owners before the Second World War were Count Alfonz Zabeo and his son-in-law Pavel Glančnik. After the war, the castle was nationalized.
