= Brodski Varoš =

- Village
- Interactive map of Brodski Varoš
- Location within Croatia
- Coordinates: 45°10′51″N 17°58′42″E
- Country: Croatia
- County: Brod-Posavina County
- Municipality: Slavonski Brod

Area
  - Total: 7.6 km^{2} (2.9 sq mi)

Population (2021)
  - Total: 1,829
  - Density: 240/km^{2} (620/sq mi)
- Time zone: UTC+1 (CET)

Brodski Varoš is a village in municipality of Slavonski Brod in Brod-Posavina County, Croatia. The town is notable for being the birthplace of Đuro Đaković, a prominent labor rights activist and communist revolutionary in Yugoslavia between two World Wars. More recently, Brodski Varoš has gained attention as the residence of Klepetan and Malena, a mating pair of storks whose relationship was covered by the media, raising public interest in the lives of migratory birds.

== History ==
Brodski Varoš was settled by German Protestants in the 1800s.
