= Zgornji Boč =

- Location in Slovenia
- Coordinates: 46°35′15.23″N 15°27′53.94″E
- Country: Slovenia
- Traditional region: Styria
- Statistical region: Drava
- Municipality: Selnica ob Dravi

Area
  - Total: 11.67 km^{2} (4.51 sq mi)
- Elevation: 797.4 m (2,616 ft)

Population (2002)
  - Total: 239

Zgornji Boč (pronounced [ˈzɡoːɾnji ˈboːtʃ]) is a settlement in the hills above the left bank of the Drava River in the Municipality of Selnica ob Dravi in northeastern Slovenia.
