= Bistrica ob Dravi =

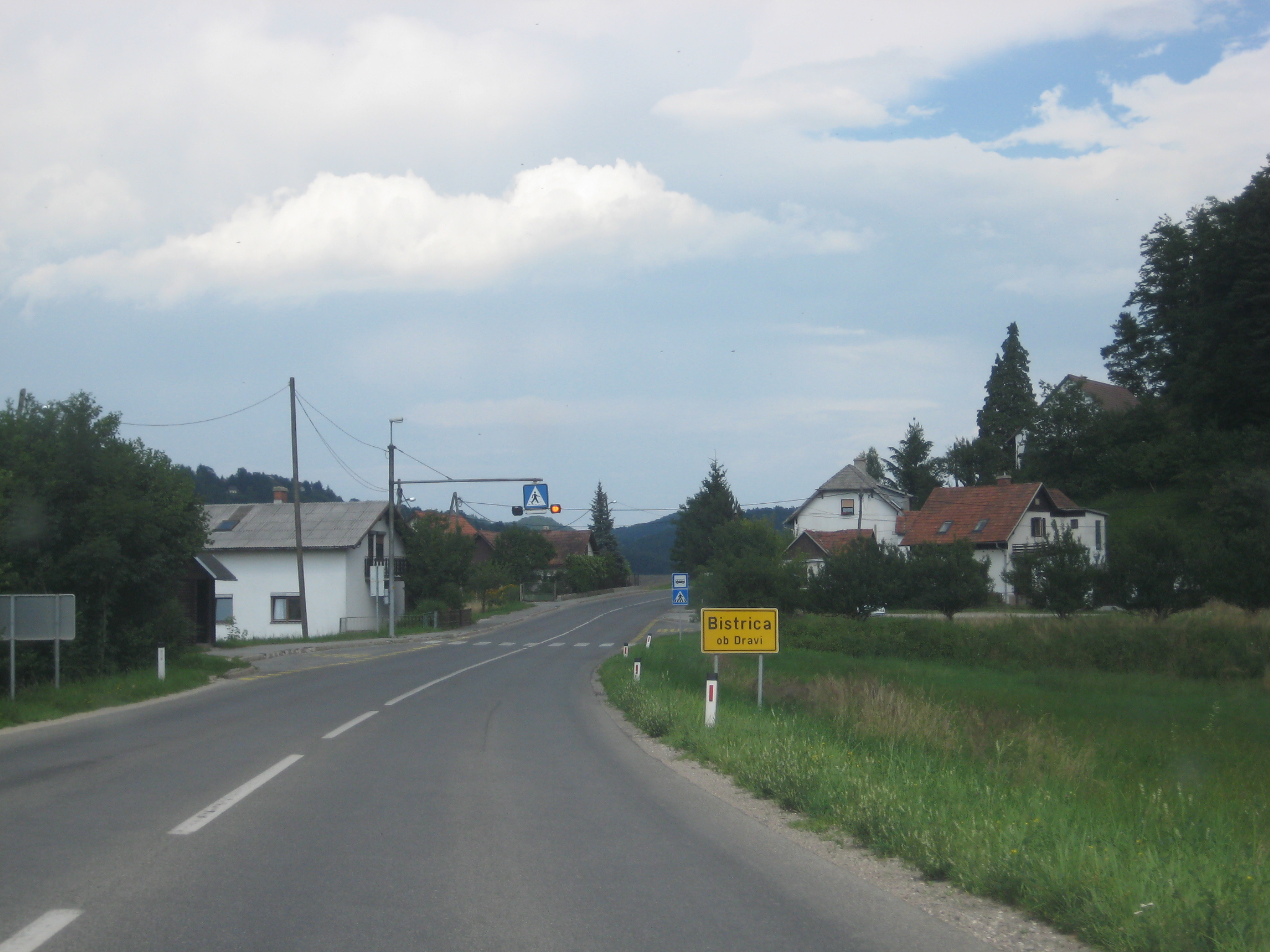

- Location in Slovenia
- Coordinates: 46°33′13.95″N 15°33′4.13″E
- Country: Slovenia
- Traditional region: Styria
- Statistical region: Drava
- Municipality: Ruše

Area
  - Total: 2.46 km^{2} (0.95 sq mi)
- Elevation: 296.4 m (972 ft)

Population (2002)
  - Total: 1,348

Bistrica ob Dravi (pronounced [ˈbiːstɾitsa ɔb ˈdɾaːʋi]) is a settlement on the right bank of the Drava River in the Municipality of Ruše in northeastern Slovenia. The area is part of the traditional region of Styria. The municipality is now included in the Drava Statistical Region.

== History ==
Bistrica ob Dravi was created as a settlement when the former settlements of Bistrica pri Limbušu (German: Feistritz bei Lembach) and Bistrica pri Rušah (German: Feistritz bei Faal or Feistritz bei Maria Rast) were merged in 1992.

== Cultural heritage ==
The village chapel-shrine dates to the late 19th century.
