= Nikola Hećimović =

Croatian communist (1900–1929)

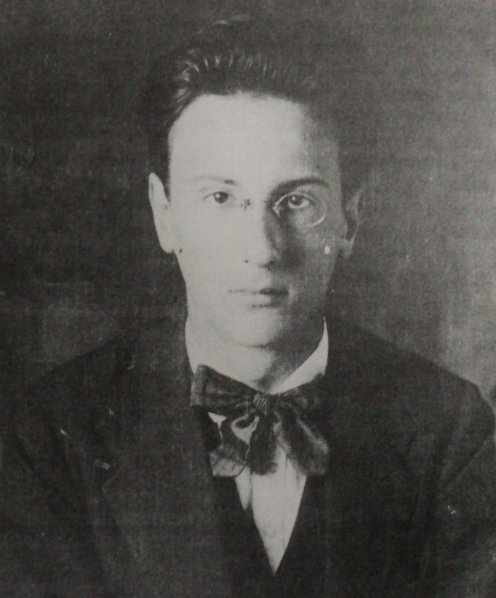
Nikola Hećimović

Nikola "Niko" Hećimović, also Nicholas (26 November 1900 – 25 April 1929) was a Croatian communist organizer and secretary of the Yugoslav branch of International Red Aid.

Hećimović was born to a middle-class family in Zagreb; his father was a school administrator. In 1919 Hećimović completed his education at the National Business Academy (Državna trgovačka akademija) in Zagreb. While in school he was attracted to the egalitarianism of communist doctrine, and became one of the early members of the Communist Party of Yugoslavia. In 1919 he founded the newspaper Iskra which provided communist perspective on the news as well doctrinal education. He helped found the League of Communist Youth of Yugoslavia (SKOJ). In 1920 he went to Prague to study, but he returned to Zagreb the following year and resumed work in the SKOJ. Taken with the idea of creating a "red cross" type of organization to help political prisoners and their families, he joined the Central Committee of the International Labour Assistance organization which in 1922 morphed into International Red Aid. In 1928 he was elected Secretary of the Yugoslav branch.

In 1929 the Communist Party was outlawed, communist newspapers were suppressed, and Hećimović came under suspicion of sedition. He was arrested on 20 April 1929 and after several days of intense questioning by police he and Đuro Đaković allegedly escaped and attempted to flee to Austria. The official, post World War II, version is that they were taken into the countryside by the police and then executed. Đaković and Hećimović were shot on 25 April in the Šele Ravine (Slovene: Šelova graba) in the hamlet of Šelovo in the northern part of the village of Veliki Boč.

== Legacy ==
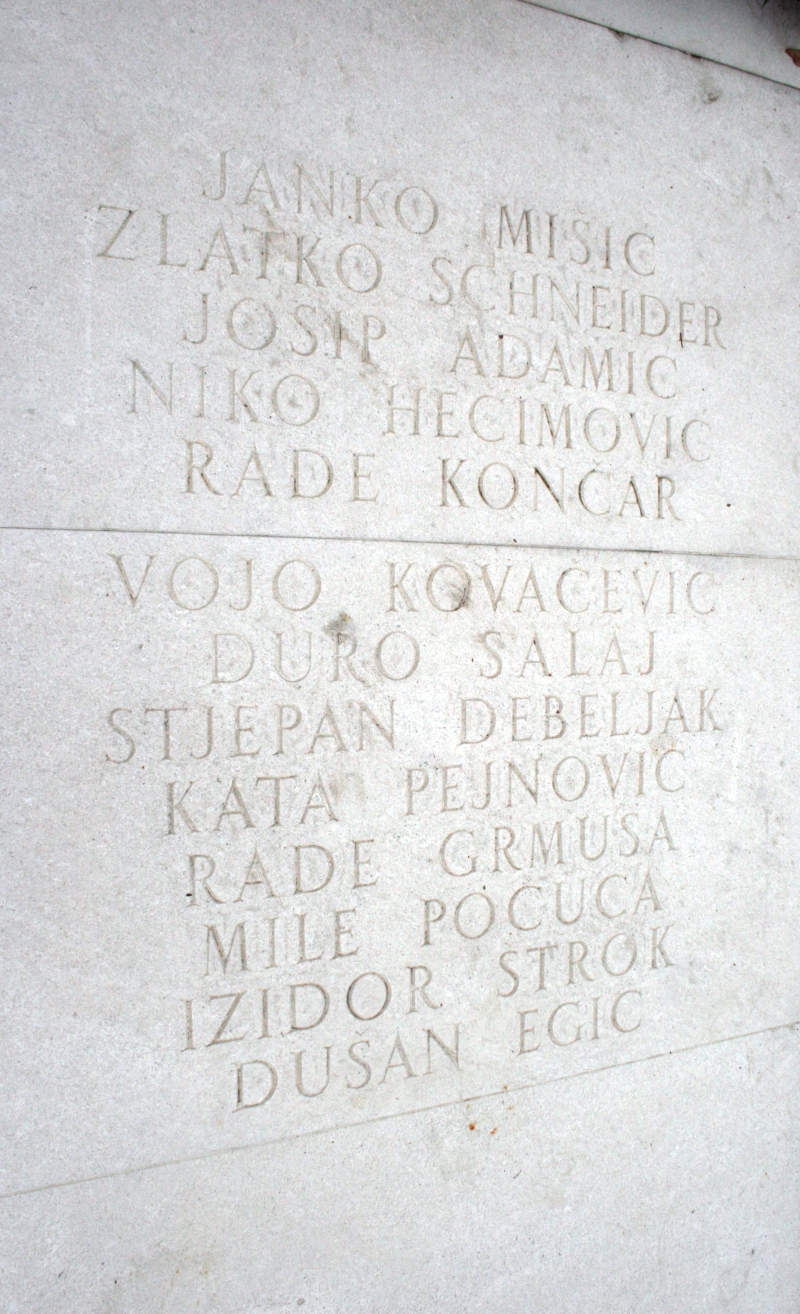
"Niko Hećimović" on right tomb panel

In 1968 Hećimović's body was reinterred in the Tomb of the People's Heroes in the Mirogoj Cemetery of Zagreb.

The 1976 film Četiri dana do smrti (Four days until death) by Miroslav Jokić features the arrest and execution of Đaković and Hećimović.

A street, in the Zagreb neighborhood of Srednjaci, was named after Hećimović.

In 1979 the Yugoslav Post issued a stamp commemorating fifty years since the assassination of Đaković and Hećimović.
