= Đuro Đaković =

Yugoslavian communist politician (1886–1929)

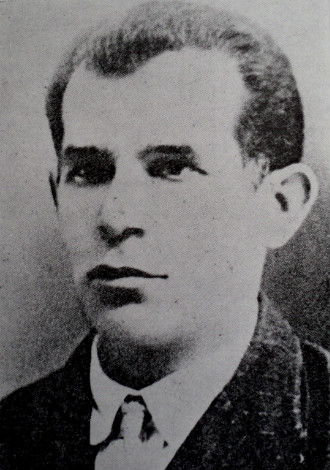
- Đuro Đaković

Organisational Secretary of the Central Committee of the Communist Party of Yugoslavia
- In office 13 April 1928 – 25 April 1929
- Preceded by: Jakob Žorga
- Succeeded by: Antun Mavrak

Personal details
- Born: 30 November 1886 Brodski Varoš, Kingdom of Croatia-Slavonia, Austria-Hungary
- Died: 29 April 1929 (aged 42) Sveti Duh na Ostrem Vrhu, Kingdom of Serbs, Croats, and Slovenes
- Party: Communist Party of Yugoslavia

Đuro Đaković (30 November 1886 – 25 April 1929) was a Yugoslav metal worker, communist and revolutionary. Đaković was the organizational secretary of the Central Committee of the Communist Party of Yugoslavia, from April 1928 to April 1929 and one of the most prominent fighters of the working class in the Kingdom of Yugoslavia.

== Life ==
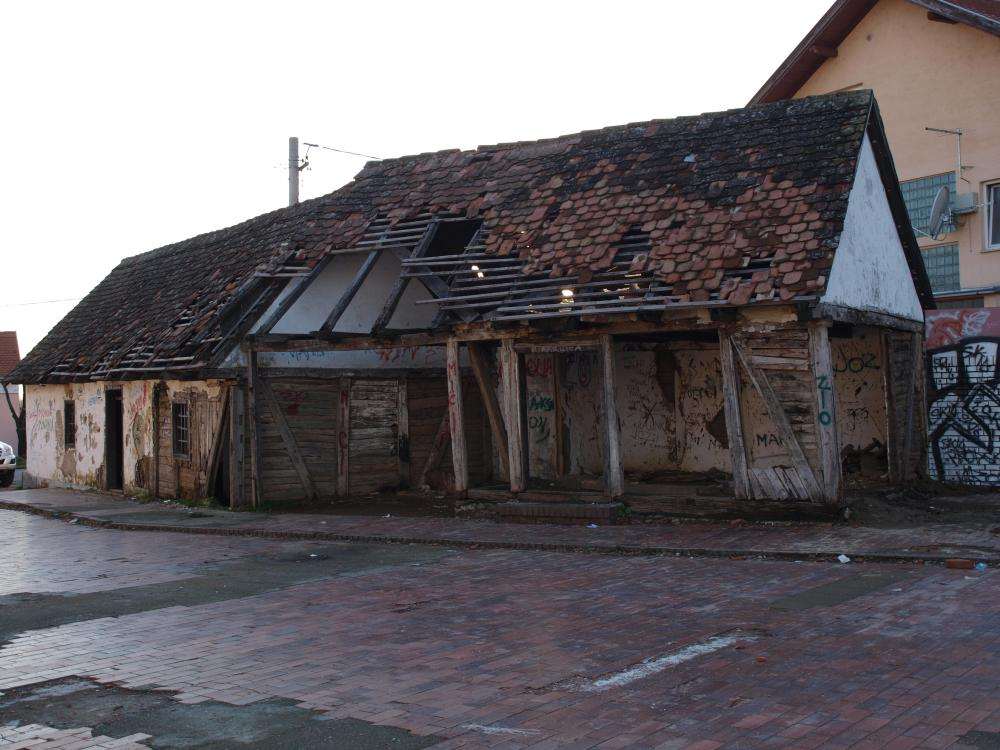
Birthplace of Đuro Đaković in Brodski Varoš

Born in the village of Brodski Varoš near Slavonski Brod, in Austria-Hungary's Kingdom of Croatia-Slavonia, to family of Croat peasants, he moved to Sarajevo in search of a job as a trained metal worker at the age of 18, where, in November 1905, he joined the newly-formed Radical Movement Union, and took part in several strikes in the following years. His son Stjepan, who was born in Sarajevo in 1912, also become a communist, and at the outbreak of WWII he joined partisans. In 1942 Stjepan was killed by the Ustaše.

At a gathering in the suburbs of Sarajevo, in early 1915, he raised his voice against the war, for which he was arrested and brought before a military court, which condemned him to death. He was later transferred to the jurisdiction of the civil court, who pardoned him and sentenced him to forced labor.

After the war, Đuro Đaković's revolutionary activity began. At the end of February, he organised a general strike of the disadvantaged workers' class attended by 30,000 workers. He was committed to making the right to vote for women and all people who have reached the age of 20 and who lived in Sarajevo for more than six months.

Đaković took part in the Unification Congress in which the Communist Party of Yugoslavia was created, and due to participation in the preparation and holding of the May 1st celebration in Sarajevo, he was arrested and spent several months in custody. At the beginning of the 1920s, he began with active political work. He was elected to the parliamentary elections for the People's Assembly of the Constitutional Assembly of the Kingdom of the Serbs, Croats and Slovenes. In June 1921 he travelled to Moscow as a delegate at the Third Congress of Comintern, and after returning to Yugoslavia he was again arrested and sentenced to ten months in prison for communist and unionist activities.

Đaković continued with the revolutionary work, and after several more arrests in 1923, he was expelled from Sarajevo to his homeland. In 1927, he enrolled at Moscow's International Lenin School and stayed there until 1928. Under the pseudonym of Bosnić he returned to Yugoslavia and worked on setting up party organizations.

Đaković actively opposed the January 6 Dictatorship of King Alexander I. Due to this, he was arrested in Zagreb together with Nikola Hećimović, secretary of the International Red Aid. They were executed on the Yugoslav-Austrian border on April 25, 1929. In an exaggerated attempt to escape responsibility, authorities have tried to conceal the murder. After exhumation, it was found that the victims were fired at a small distance, which proved to be a murder.

== Memory ==
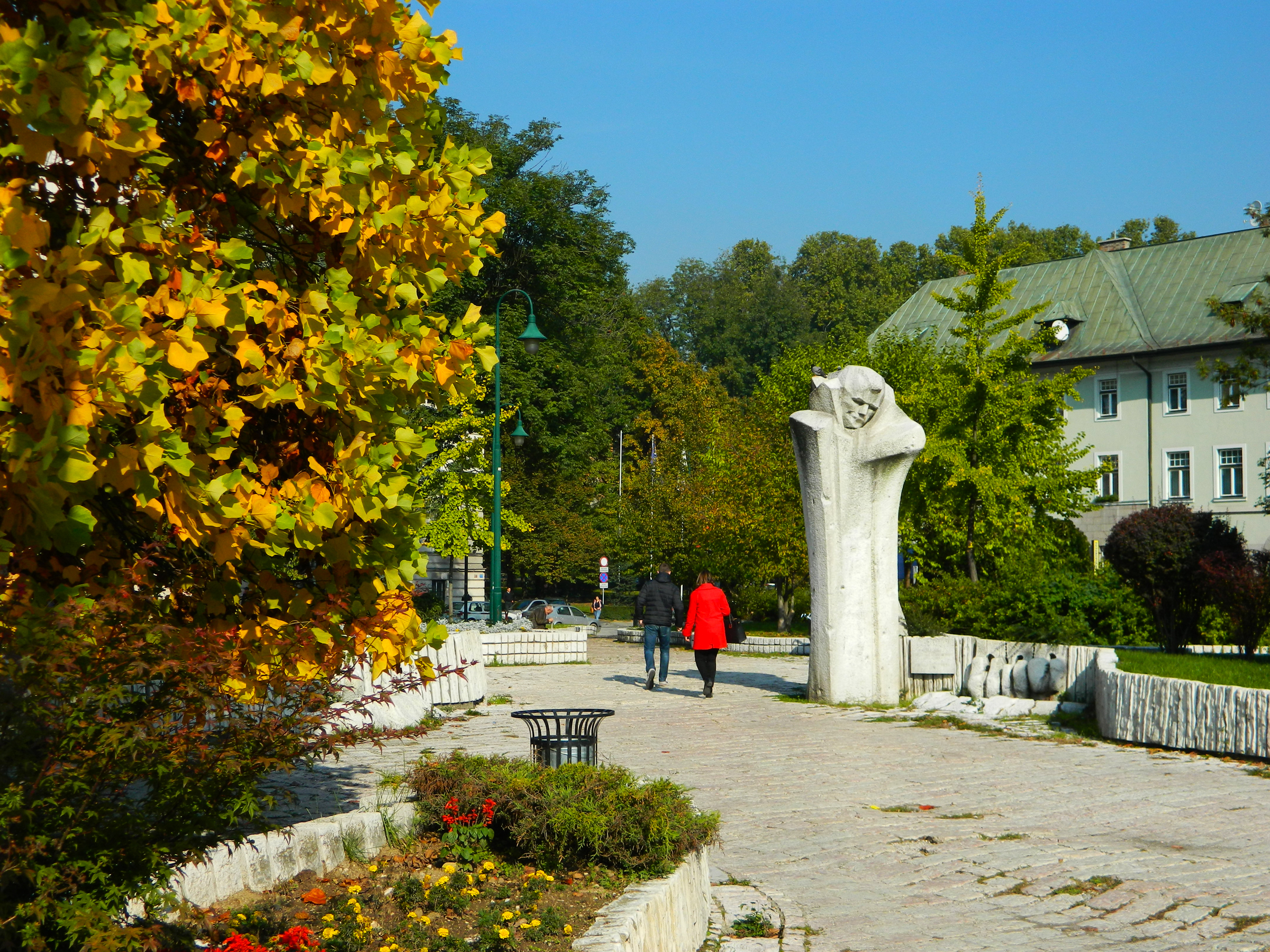
Đuro Đaković Memorial in Sarajevo, by Ljubomir Denković, 1973

In summer 1937, Đaković's name was given to one of the battalions of the 129th International Brigade of the Spanish Republican Army.

In 1942, in Belgium a military resistance movement unit made up of Yugoslav immigrants, mostly miners, originating from the Dalmatian border and the surrounding area of Imotski, also took his name.

In his birthplace Slavonski Brod, the wagon factory where Đaković once worked was named after him in 1947. The company is still known as Đuro Đaković Grupa d.d.

In Sarajevo, Alipaša Street was named after him from 1945 to the 1990s. His name was also given to the Bosnian Cultural Center, the main cinema hall in post-war Sarajevo. A memorial park with a statue was built nearby Alipaša Street in 1973, on a project by Ljubomir Denković, professor at the Academy of Art in Novi Sad, in a style that art historian and museum advisor Miloš Arsić called sculptures of natural vitalism. The memorial park was renamed in 2017 in honour of the 1st Corps of the RBiH Army.

From 1945 to 1990 a street in Zagreb was named after him, Đuro Đaković Workers' Street (Radnička cesta Đure Đakovića). The name was shortened to Workers' Street (Radnička cesta) after the Croatian War of Independence.

A street in Ljubljana was also renamed after him, Đaković Road (Slovene: Djakovićeva cesta), but the original name Litostroj Road (Litostrojska cesta) was restored in 1993.

In Belgrade, the street once named after him was later re-dedicated by splitting to Eleftherios Venizelos and Raymond Poincaré.

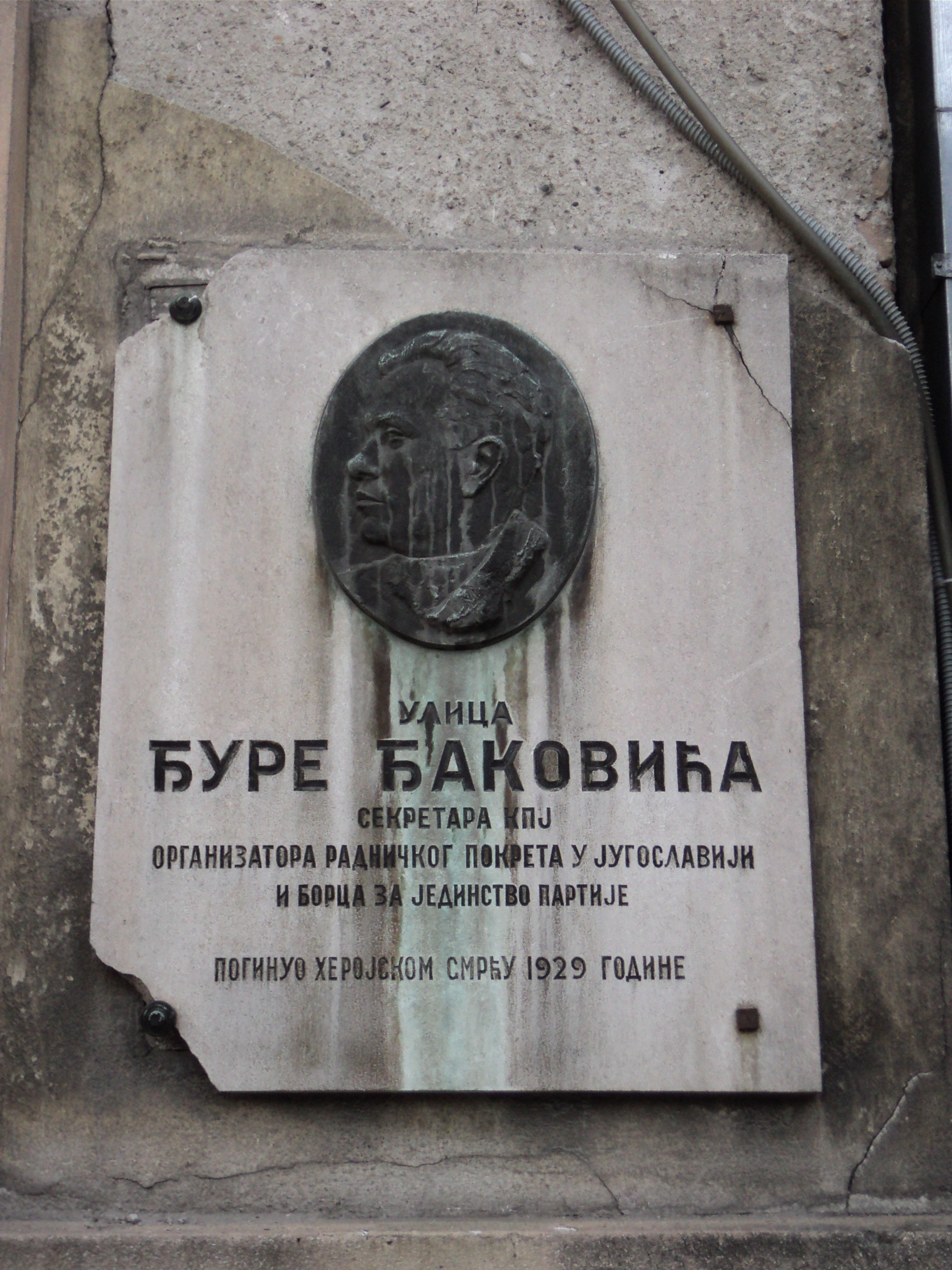
Memorial plaque dedicated to Đuro Đaković in Eleftherios Venizelos Street (former Đuro Đaković Street), Belgrade.

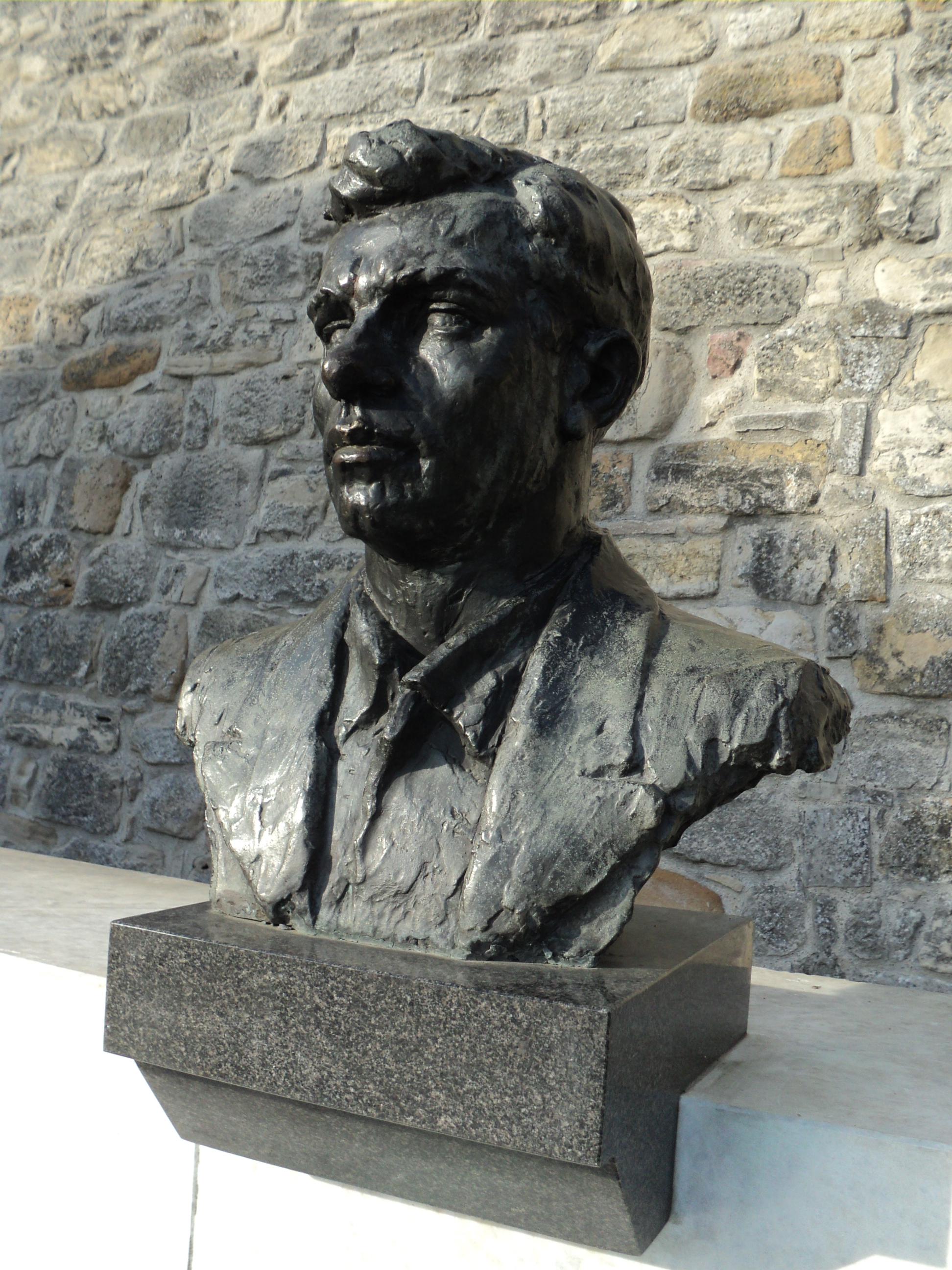
Bust of Đuro Đaković at the Tomb of People's Heroes in Belgrade Fortress

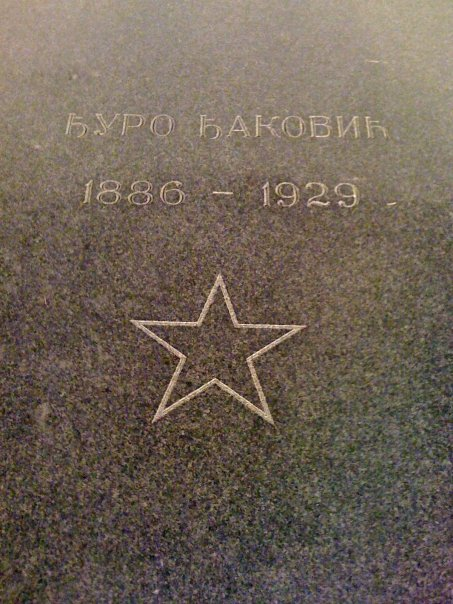
Tomb of Đuro Đaković in Belgrade Fortress

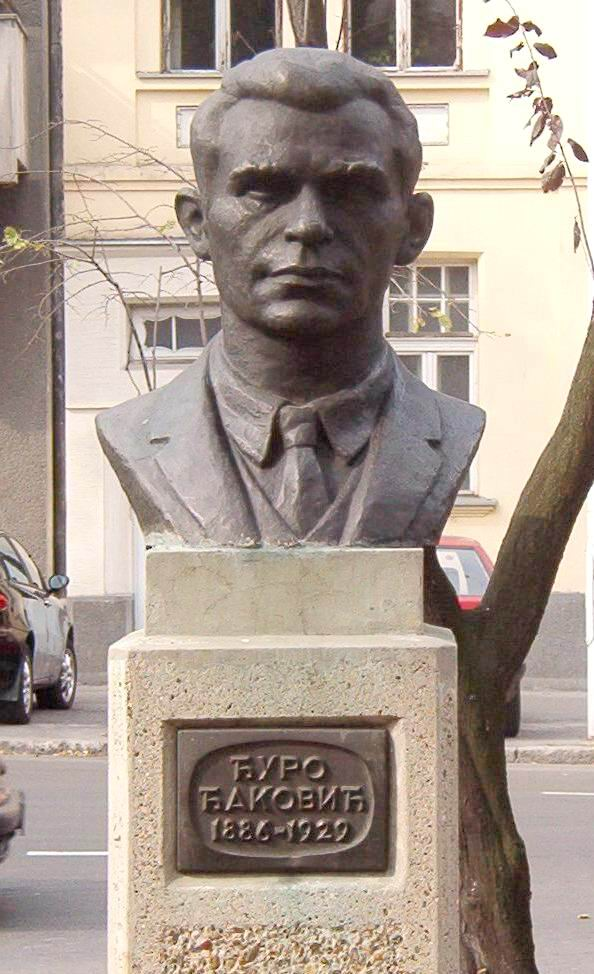
Bust of Đuro Đaković in Belgrade

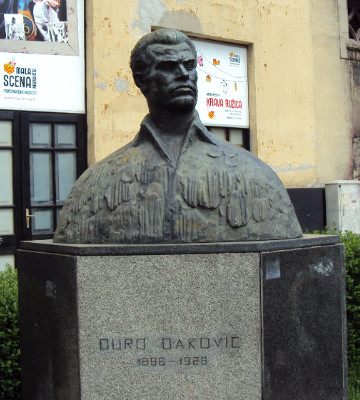
Bust of Đuro Đaković in Zagreb

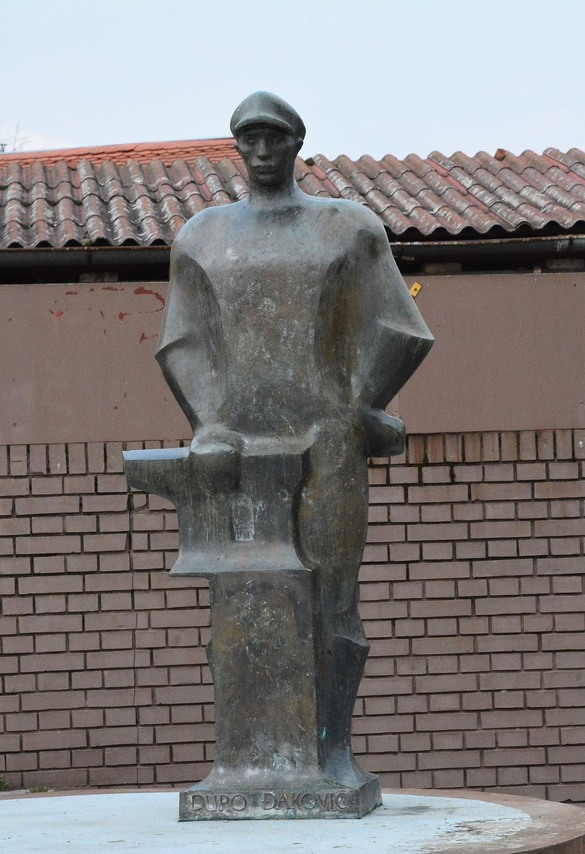
Statue of Đuro Đaković in his birthplace near Slavonski Brod
