= Municipality of Ruše =

Municipality of Slovenia

Municipality of Ruše Občina Ruše
- Municipality
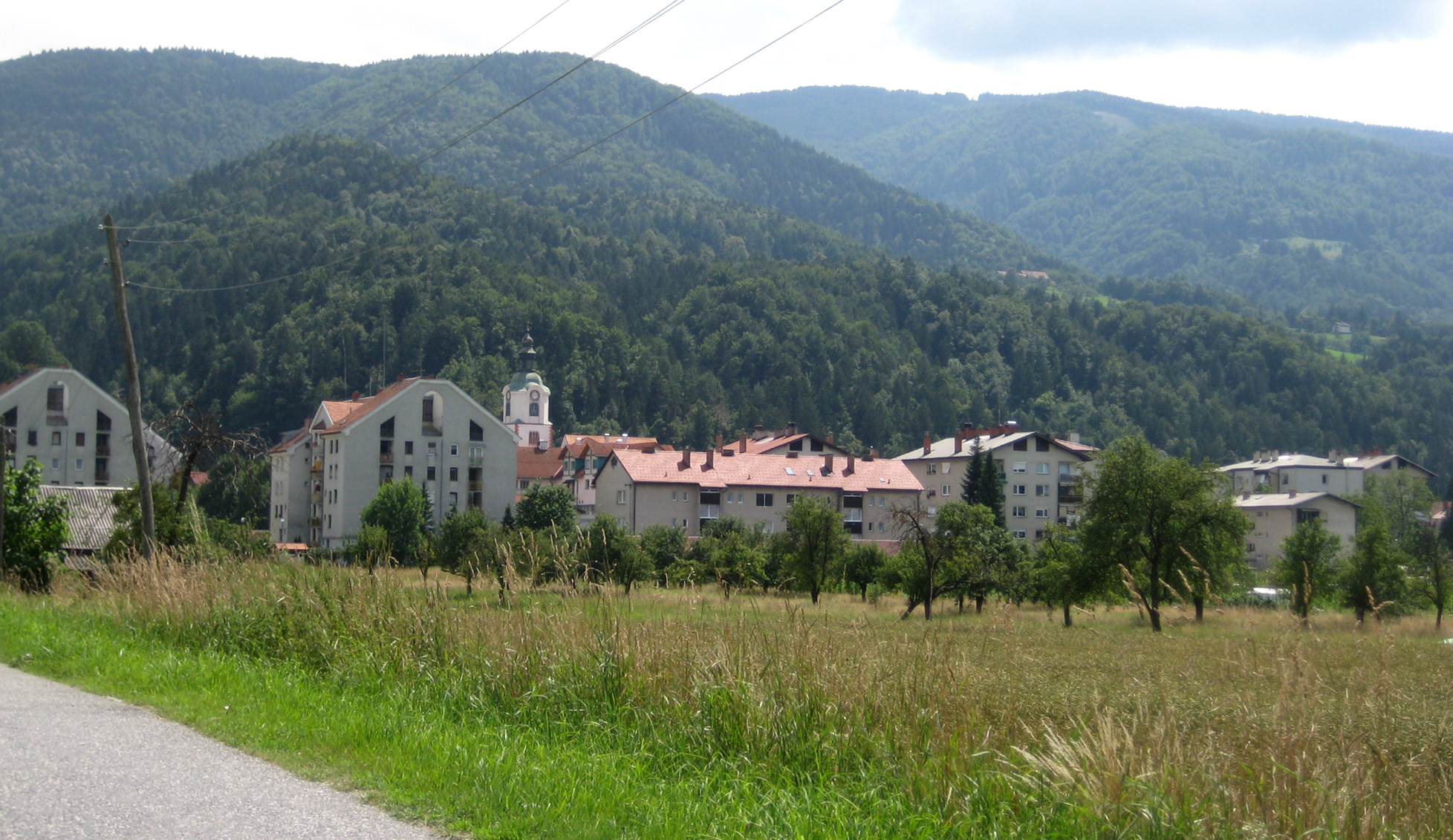

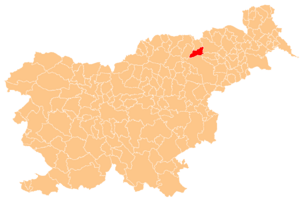
- Location of the Municipality of Ruše in Slovenia
- Coordinates: 46°32′18″N 15°30′55″E
- Country: Slovenia

Government
  - Mayor: Urška Repolusk

Area
  - Total: 60.8 km^{2} (23.5 sq mi)

Population (2020)
  - Total: 7,017
  - Density: 115/km^{2} (299/sq mi)
- Time zone: UTC+01 (CET)
  - Summer (DST): UTC+02 (CEST)
- Website: ruse.si

The Municipality of Ruše (pronounced [ˈɾuːʃɛ]; Slovene: Občina Ruše) is a municipality in northeastern Slovenia. The seat of the municipality is the town of Ruše. It lies on the right bank of the Drava River west of Maribor and extends south into the Pohorje Hills. The area is part of the traditional region of Styria. It is now included in the Drava Statistical Region.

== Settlements ==
In addition to the municipal seat of Ruše, the municipality also includes the following settlements:

- Bezena
- Bistrica ob Dravi
- Fala
- Lobnica
- Log
- Smolnik
