= Fala, Selnica ob Dravi =

Fala
- Location in Slovenia
- Coordinates: 46°32′46.38″N 15°27′12.72″E
- Country: Slovenia
- Traditional region: Styria
- Statistical region: Drava
- Municipality: Selnica ob Dravi

Area
  - Total: 1.8 km^{2} (0.69 sq mi)
- Elevation: 290.1 m (952 ft)

Population (2002)
  - Total: 349

Fala (pronounced [ˈfaːla]) is a settlement on the Drava River in Slovenia. The settlement's part on the left bank of the river belongs to the Municipality of Selnica ob Dravi and the remainder, on the right bank of the river, belongs to the Municipality of Ruše.

== Name ==
Fala was mentioned in written sources in 1245 as in domo Volmari (and as de Valle in 1279, Vall and Valle in 1289, and Fall in 1495). The name is of unclear origin, although the initial F- indicates a German origin. It could be derived from Old High German falo 'yellowish' (referring to soil or water color) or from valle 'trap' (referring to hunting activity). Derivation from Latin vallis 'valley' is unlikely because the area was not under Romance influence.

== History ==
The settlement was historically a property of Fala Castle, on the opposite side of the river.

== Notable people ==
Notable people that were born or lived in Fala include:

- Miloš Štibler (1882–1969), social activist
- Alojz Šušmelj (1913–1942), painter
