= Luis Falla =

Peruvian lawyer and politician

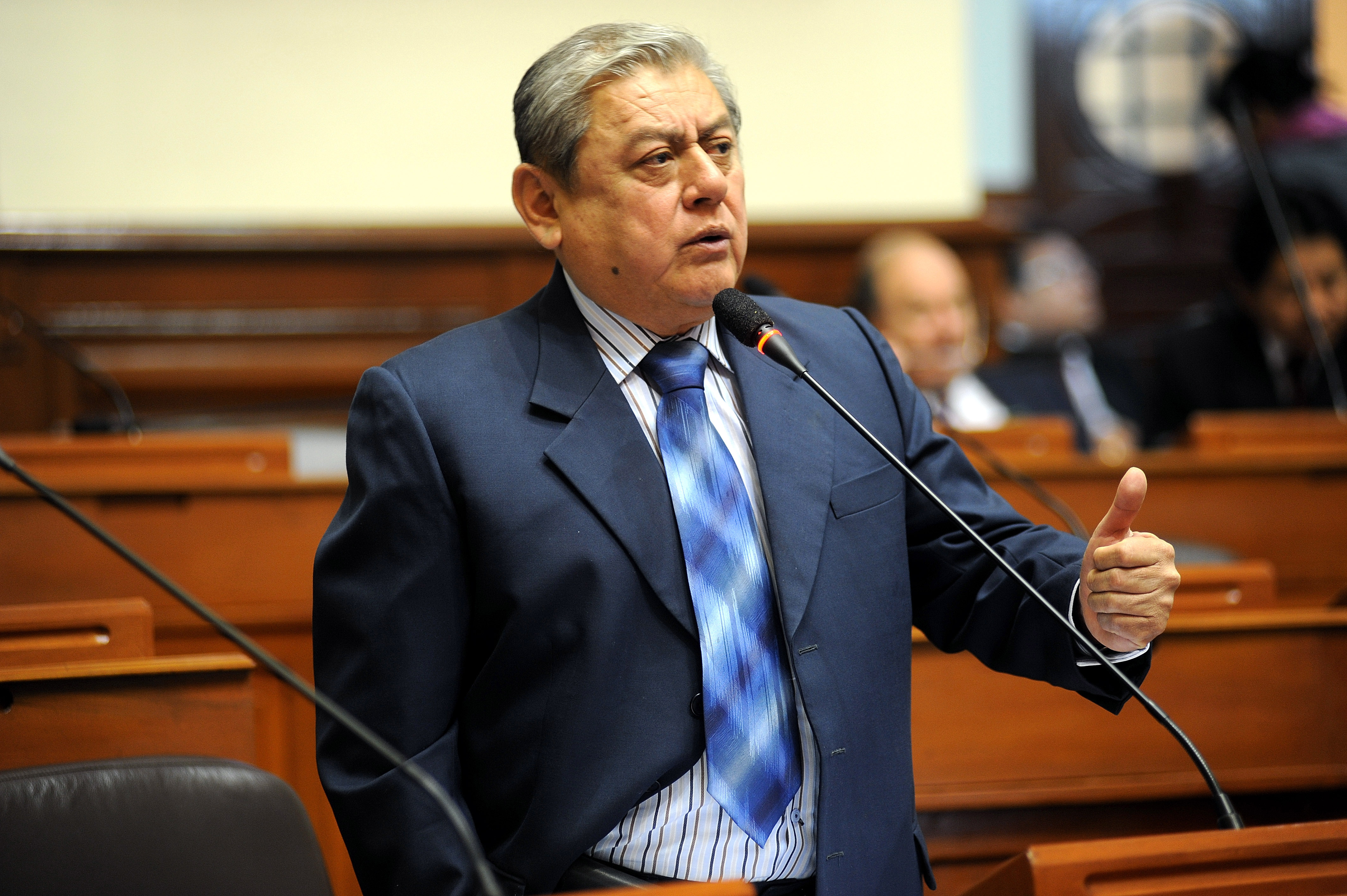
- Falla in 2010

Member of Congress
- In office 26 July 2006 – 26 July 2011
- Constituency: Lambayeque

Member of the Chamber of Deputies
- In office 26 July 1990 – 5 April 1992
- Constituency: Lambayeque

Personal details
- Born: Luis Humberto Falla Lamadrid; 15 April 1946 (age 80) Olmos, Peru
- Party: Peruvian Aprista Party
- Education: National University of Trujillo
- Occupation: Politician
- Profession: Lawyer

Luis Humberto Falla Lamadrid (born 15 April 1946) is a Peruvian lawyer and politician. He is a former Congressman, elected in the 2006 elections, representing the Lambayeque region for the 2006–2011 term.He lost his seat in the 2011 elections, when he ran for re-election, but he received a low number of votes. He was previously a deputy representing the Lambayeque region from 1990 to 1992 when President Alberto Fujimori shut Congress down in a self-coup. Falla belongs to the Peruvian Aprista Party.

== Biography ==
He was born in Olmos, Lambayeque Province, on April 15, 1946. He studied primary school in his hometown and secondary school in Chiclayo. In 1973 he moved to Trujillo to pursue higher studies at the Law School of the National University of Trujillo, graduating and obtaining a law degree in 1979.

=== Political career ===
He was elected in the 1990 elections as a deputy representing Lambayeque under the Peruvian Aprista party but his mandate was cut off by the 1992 autogolpe given by President Alberto Fujimori. He attempted to run for re-election in the 1995 elections without success. In the regional elections of 2002, he attempted to run for the Regional Presidency of Lambayeque but, he was unsuccessful. In the 2006 elections, he was elected Congressman by Lambayeque, a position he held until 2011. He attempted to run for re-election in the elections of that year, but he was unsuccessful
