= Municipality of Selnica ob Dravi =

Municipality of Slovenia

Municipality of Selnica ob Dravi Občina Selnica ob Dravi
- Municipality
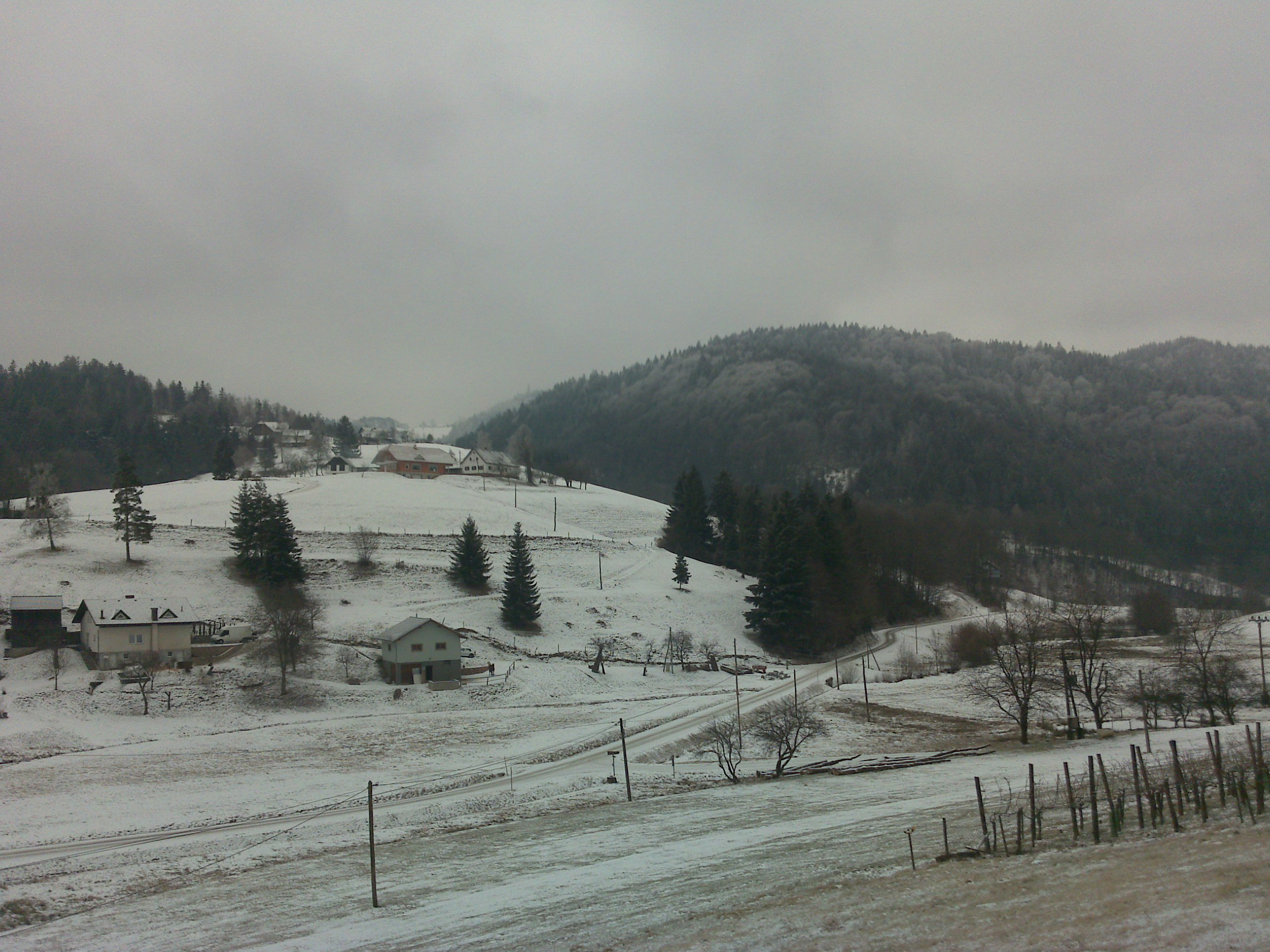

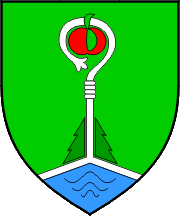
- Coat of arms

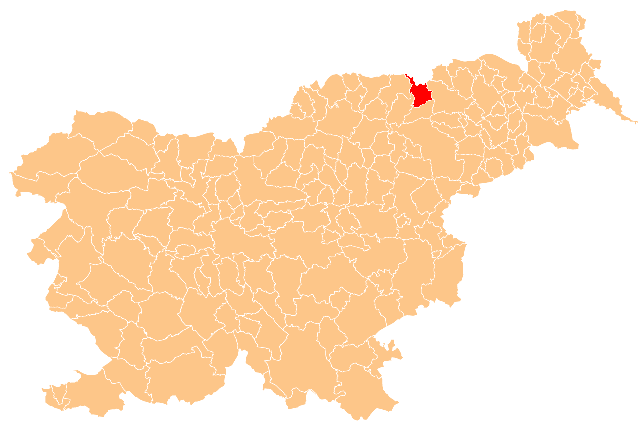
- Location of the Municipality of Selnica ob Dravi in Slovenia
- Coordinates: 46°35′N 15°30′E
- Country: Slovenia

Government
  - Mayor: Vlasta Kremelj

Area
  - Total: 64.5 km^{2} (24.9 sq mi)

Population (July 1, 2018)
  - Total: 4,478
  - Density: 69.4/km^{2} (180/sq mi)
- Time zone: UTC+01 (CET)
  - Summer (DST): UTC+02 (CEST)
- Website: www.selnica.si

The Municipality of Selnica ob Dravi (Slovene: Občina Selnica ob Dravi) is a municipality in the traditional region of Styria in northeastern Slovenia. The seat of the municipality is the town of Selnica ob Dravi. Selnica ob Dravi became a municipality in 1998. It borders Austria.

== Settlements ==
In addition to the municipal seat of Selnica ob Dravi, the municipality also includes the following settlements:

- Črešnjevec ob Dravi
- Fala
- Gradišče na Kozjaku
- Janževa Gora
- Spodnja Selnica
- Spodnji Boč
- Spodnji Slemen
- Sveti Duh na Ostrem Vrhu
- Veliki Boč
- Vurmat
- Zgornja Selnica
- Zgornji Boč
- Zgornji Slemen
