= Fužina, Ivančna Gorica =

Fužina
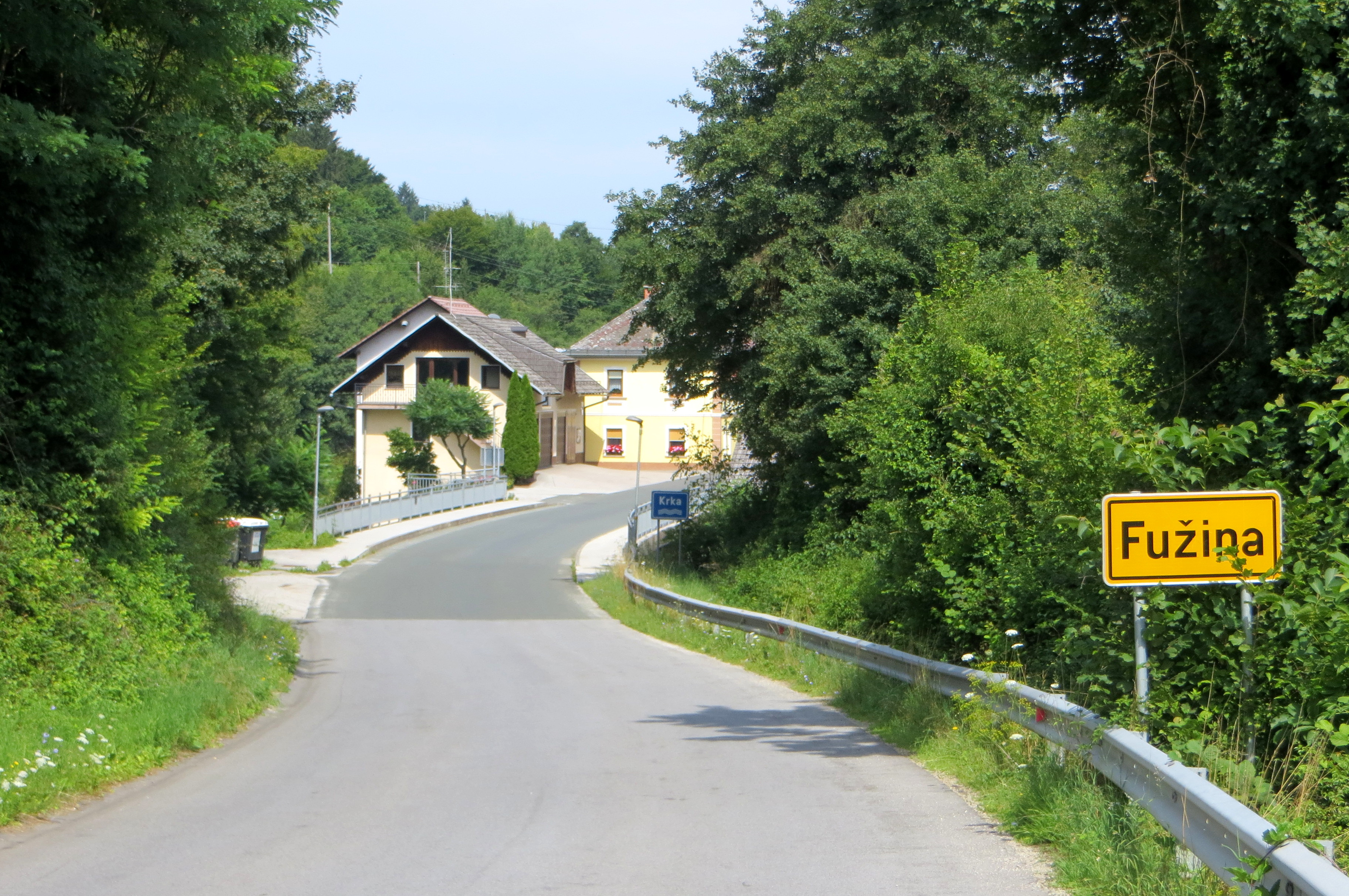

- Location in Slovenia
- Coordinates: 45°51′44.27″N 14°49′53.52″E
- Country: Slovenia
- Traditional region: Lower Carniola
- Statistical region: Central Slovenia
- Municipality: Ivančna Gorica

Area
  - Total: 0.48 km^{2} (0.19 sq mi)
- Elevation: 263.5 m (865 ft)

Population (2002)
  - Total: 144

Fužina (pronounced [fuˈʒiːna]) is a small village on the left bank of the Krka River in the Municipality of Ivančna Gorica in central Slovenia. The area is part of the historical region of Lower Carniola. The municipality is now included in the Central Slovenia Statistical Region.

A small hydroelectric plant is located in the settlement. It was built in 1925.
