= Ruše =

- Town
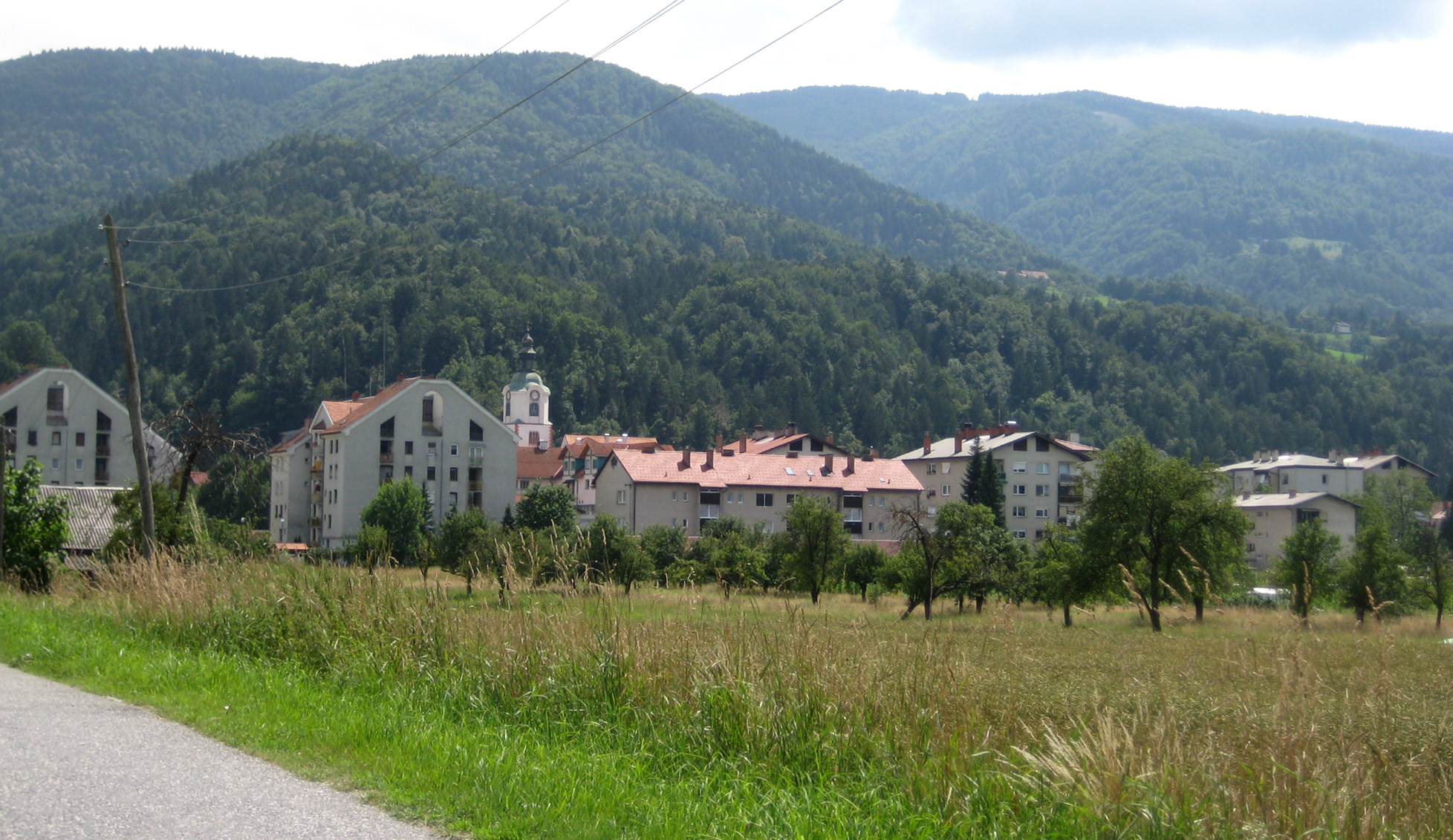
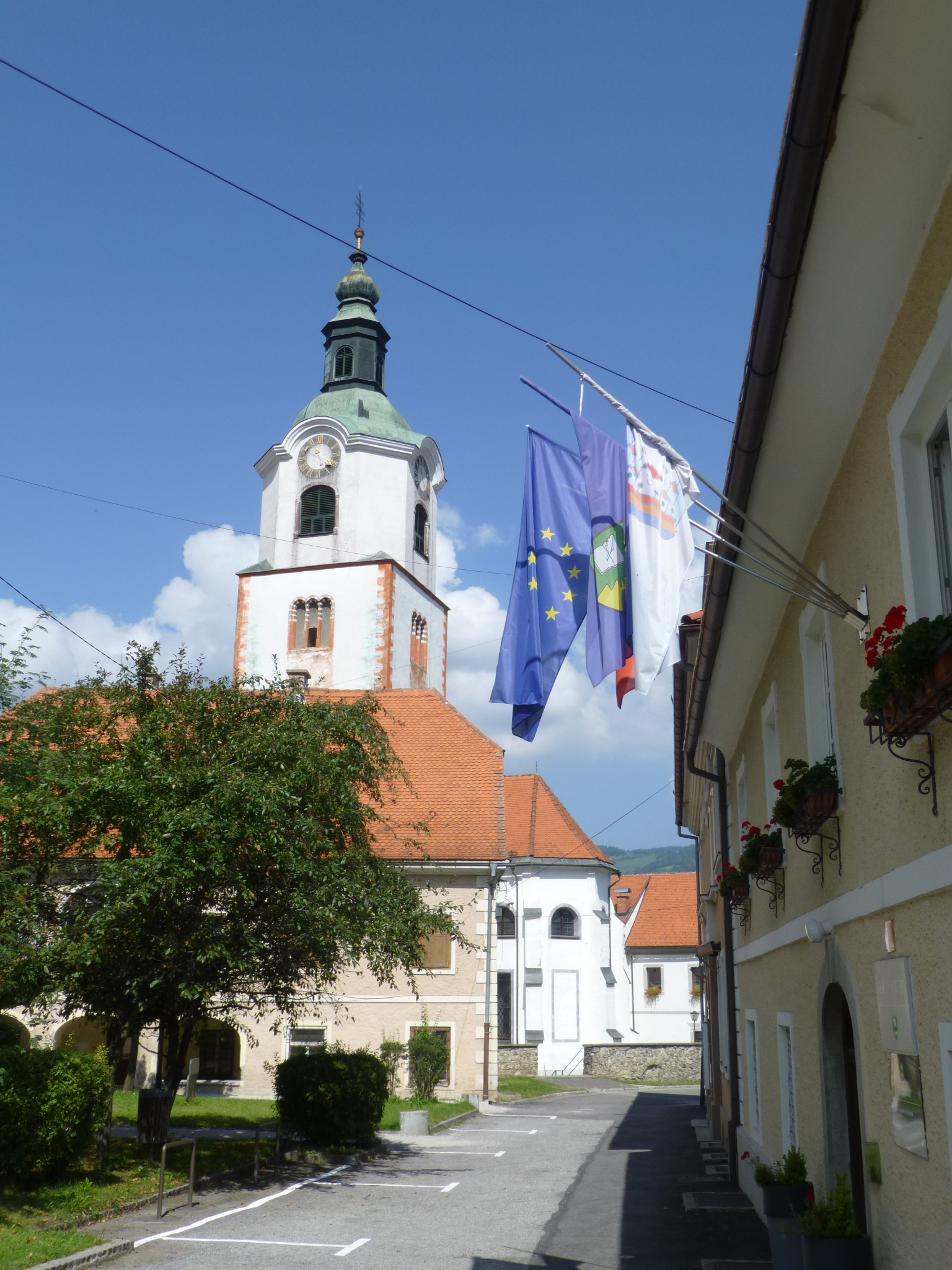
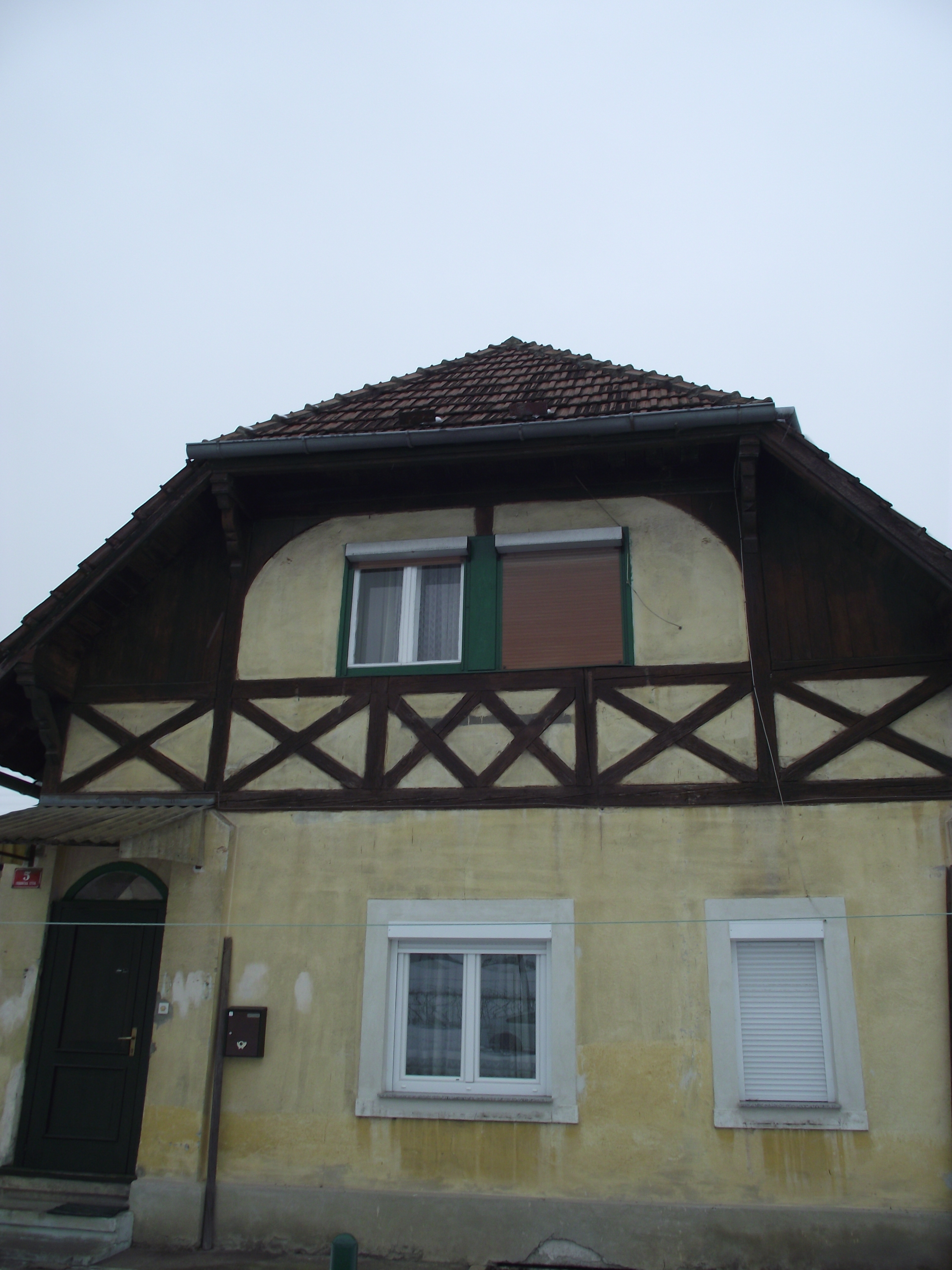
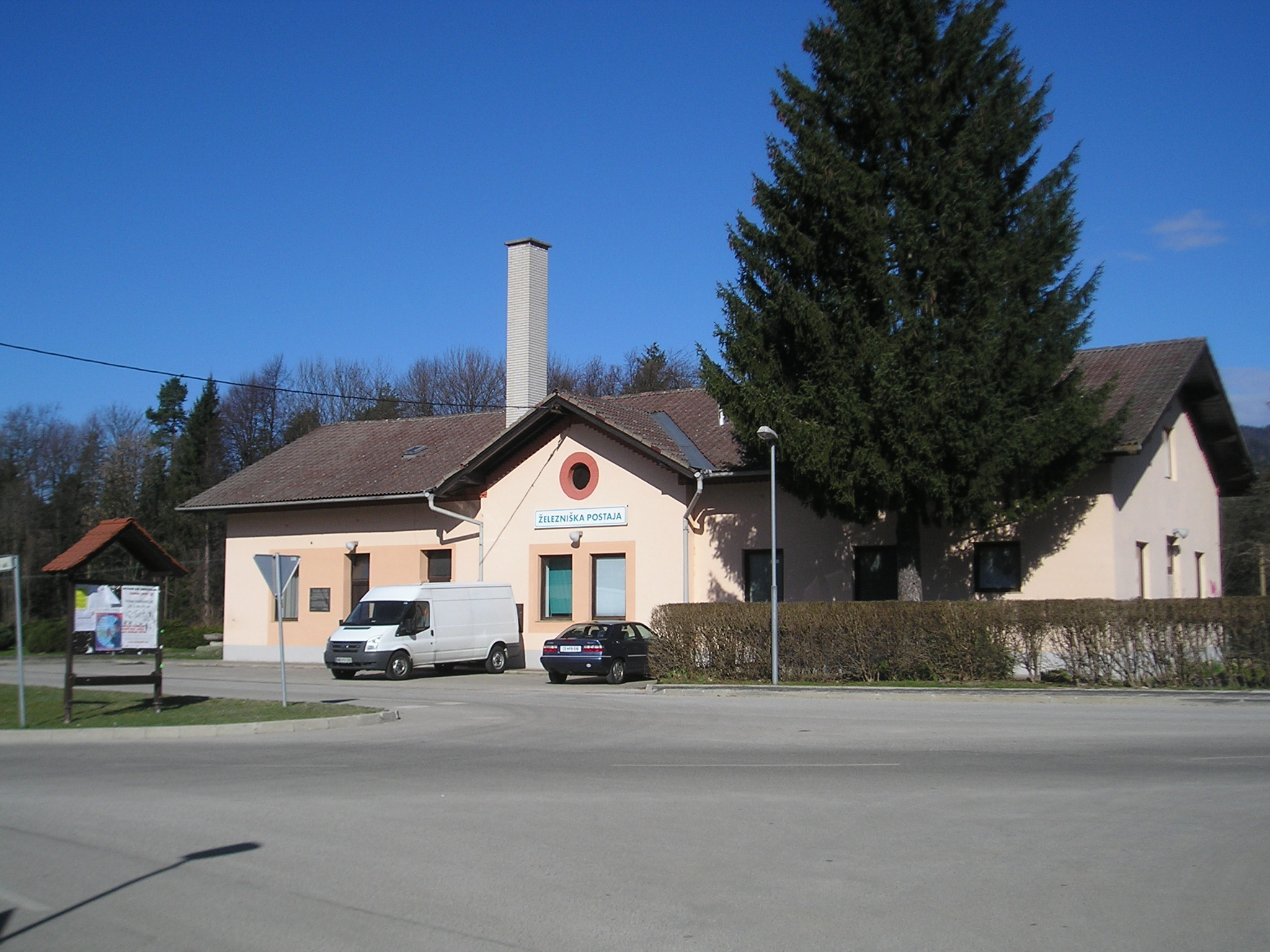
- From top, left to right: Overview of Ruše, Holy Mary's Church, Old house, Railway Station

- Flag Coat of arms

- Location in Slovenia
- Coordinates: 46°32′18.87″N 15°30′55.44″E
- Country: Slovenia
- Traditional region: Styria
- Statistical region: Drava
- Municipality: Ruše

Area
  - Total: 2.36 km^{2} (0.91 sq mi)
- Elevation: 307.7 m (1,010 ft)

Population (2020)
  - Total: 4,208
- Vehicle registration: MB
- Climate: Cfb

Ruše (pronounced [ˈɾùːʃɛ]; German: Maria Rast) is a small town in northeastern Slovenia. It is the seat of the Municipality of Ruše and lies on the right bank of the Drava River west of Maribor. The area is part of the traditional region of Styria. It is now included in the Drava Statistical Region.

== Name ==
Ruše was mentioned in written sources in 1091 as Ro^{v}ste (and as Roiste in 1184 and Råst in 1372, among other names). The name developed from the plural demonym *Rovьščane, derived from *rovъ 'ditch, trench', thus referring to people living near such a feature.

== Church ==
The parish church in the settlement is dedicated to the Holy Name of Mary and belongs to the Roman Catholic Archdiocese of Maribor. It was first mentioned in written documents dating to 1387, but was destroyed in an Ottoman raid in 1532. It was rebuilt soon after and then extended in the 17th century. The church was damaged by fire in 1779.

== Population ==
Historical population
Year	Pop.	±%
1948	2,053	—
1953	2,468	+20.2%
1961	3,125	+26.6%
1971	3,642	+16.5%
1981	4,761	+30.7%
1991	4,807	+1.0%
2002	4,571	−4.9%
2011	4,503	−1.5%
2021	4,214	−6.4%
Population size may be affected by changes in administrative divisions.
