= Selnica ob Dravi =

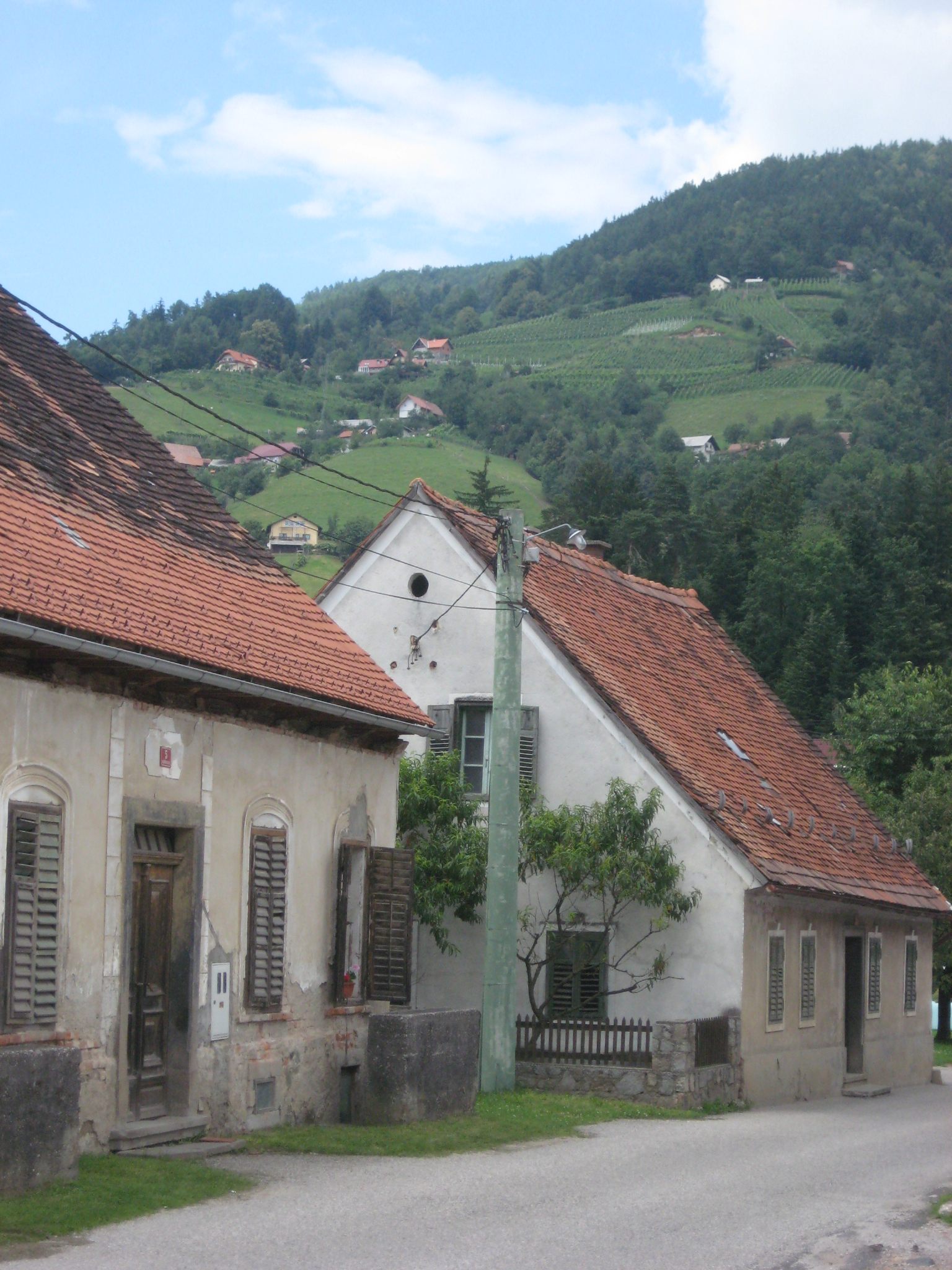

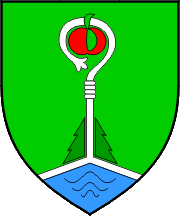
- Coat of arms

- Location in Slovenia
- Coordinates: 46°33′5″N 15°29′41″E
- Country: Slovenia
- Traditional region: Styria
- Statistical region: Drava
- Municipality: Selnica ob Dravi

Area
  - Total: 2.61 km^{2} (1.01 sq mi)
- Elevation: 314.6 m (1,032 ft)

Population (2019)
  - Total: 1,348
  - Density: 516/km^{2} (1,340/sq mi)

Selnica ob Dravi (pronounced [ˈséːlnitsa ɔb ˈdɾàːʋi]; German: Zellnitz an der Drau) is a village on the left bank of the Drava River in Slovenia. It is the seat of the Municipality of Selnica ob Dravi.

The parish church in the village is dedicated to Saint Margaret and belongs to the Roman Catholic Archdiocese of Maribor. It is built in the centre of the village and was first mentioned in written documents dating to 1372. It is an originally Gothic building with early and late 18th-century additions.

== Notable people ==
- Zinka Zorko (1936–2019), linguist and academic
