= Drava Statistical Region =

Coordinates: 46°27′00″N 15°41′00″E

Drava Statistical Region podravska statistična regija
- Statistical region
- Municipalities: 41
- Largest city: Maribor

Area
  - Total: 2,170 km^{2} (840 sq mi)

Population (2025)
  - Total: 331,504
  - Density: 153/km^{2} (396/sq mi)

Statistics
  - Households: 133,789
  - Employed: 104,446
  - Registered unemployed: 20,061
  - College/university students: 11,887
  - Regional GDP (2019): EUR 6,135 bn (EUR 18,887 per capita)
- HDI (2022): 0.898 very high · 7th

The Drava Statistical Region (Slovene: podravska statistična regija) is a statistical region in Slovenia. The largest city in the region is Maribor. The region's name comes from the Drava River and includes land on both banks along its course through Slovenia as well as the Pohorje mountains in the northeast of the region. The Drava is used for the production of hydroelectricity and the fertile land around it is used for agriculture. The share of job vacancies in all available jobs is among the highest in Slovenia and the region has a positive net migration rate but a very high natural decrease, which means an overall decrease in the population.

== Cities and towns ==
The Drava Statistical Region includes six cities and towns, the largest of which is Maribor.

Rank	Name	Population (2025)
1	Maribor	97,522
2	Ptuj	18,291
3	Slovenska Bistrica	8,362
4	Ruše	4,217
5	Lenart v Slovenskih Goricah	3,498
6	Ormož	1,939

== Administrative divisions ==
The Drava Statistical Region comprises the following 41 municipalities:

- Benedikt
- Cerkvenjak
- Cirkulane
- Destrnik
- Dornava
- Duplek
- Gorišnica
- Hajdina
- Hoče–Slivnica
- Juršinci
- Kidričevo
- Kungota
- Lenart
- Lovrenc na Pohorju
- Majšperk
- Makole
- Maribor
- Markovci
- Miklavž na Dravskem Polju
- Oplotnica
- Ormož
- Pesnica
- Podlehnik
- Poljčane
- Ptuj
- Rače–Fram
- Ruše
- Selnica ob Dravi
- Šentilj
- Slovenska Bistrica
- Središče ob Dravi
- Starše
- Sveta Ana
- Sveta Trojica v Slovenskih Goricah
- Sveti Andraž v Slovenskih Goricah
- Sveti Jurij v Slovenskih Goricah
- Sveti Tomaž
- Trnovska Vas
- Videm
- Zavrč
- Žetale

== Demographics ==
The population in 2025 was 331,504. It has a total area of 2,170 km².

== Economy ==
Employment structure: 63.4% services, 35.8% industry, 0.8% agriculture.

=== Tourism ===
It attracts only 3.2% of the total number of tourists in Slovenia, most being from foreign countries (68.9%).

== Transportation ==
- Length of motorways: 132.7 km
- Length of other roads: 6,422.9 km

== Sources ==
- Slovenian regions in figures 2014
