= 2022 Slovenian local elections =

Local elections in Slovenia 2022
Basic data
City municipalities:	12
Total municipalities:	212
Mayor candidates:	618
Council member candidates:	18,671
First round
Date:	20 November 2022
Registered voters:	1,683,662
Participation::	802,050
Percent:	47.64 %
Second round
Date:	4 December 2022
Registered voters:	490,639
Participation:	206,547
Percent:	42.10 %
Previous elections
Year:	2018

The 2022 Slovenian local elections were held 20 November (1st) and 4 December (2nd round). Mayors of all 212 municipalities and members of municipal councils were elected.

== Elected mayors ==
=== City municipalities ===
Ljubljana	Maribor	Kranj	Koper	Celje	Novo Mesto
291,140	97,019	36,874	24,996	37,520	23,341
Zoran Janković (GV)	Saša Arsenovič (GV)	Matjaž Rakovec (SD)	Aleš Bržan (LA + GV)	Matija Kovač (GV)	Gregor Macedoni (GV)
Velenje	Nova Gorica	Krško	Ptuj	Murska Sobota	Slovenj Gradec
25,456	13,021	25,992	18,164	11,614	7,519
Peter Dermol (SD)	Samo Turel (GV)	Janez Kerin (GV)	Nuška Gajšek (SD)	Damjan Anželj (SD)	Tilen Klugler (GV)

Domžale	Kamnik	Sl. Bistrica	Brežice
36.675	29.925	24.462	24.051
Renata Kosec (LRK)	Matej Slapar (NS)	Ivan Žagar (SLS)	Ivan Molan (GV)
Škofja Loka	Jesenice	Grosuplje	Žalec
22.667	21.340	21.314	21.210
Tine Radinja (GV)	Peter Bohinec (SD)	Peter Verlič (SDS)	Janko Kos (SD)

=== Smaller municipalities ===
The rest of all 192 ordinary municipalities with less than 20,000 citizens

Ajdovščina	Ankaran	Apače	Beltinci	Benedikt
Tadej Beočanin (SD)	Gregor Strmčnik (GV)	Andrej Steyer (SDS)	Marko Virag (GV)	Milan Repič (SLS)
Bistrica ob Sotli	Bled	Bloke	Bohinj	Borovnica
Franjo Debelak (GV)	Anton Mežan (GV)	Jože Doles (SLS)	Jože Sodja (GV)	Peter Črnilogar (GV)
Bovec	Braslovče	Brda	Brezovica	Cankova
Valter Mlekuž (GV)	Tomaž Žohar (GV)	Franc Mužič (GV)	Metod Ropret (GV)	Danilo Kacijan (GV)
Cerklje na Gorenj.	Cerknica	Cerkno	Cerkvenjak	Cirkulane
Franc Čebulj (GV)	Marko Rupar (SDS)	Gašper Uršić (GV)	Marjan Žmavc (GV)	Antonija Žumbar (SV)
Črenšovci	Črna na Koroškem	Črnomelj	Destrnik	Divača
Vera Markoja (GV)	Romana Lesjak (GV)	Vladimir Radovič (GV)	A. T. Toplak (SDS + SLS)	A. Štrucl Dovgan (GV)
Dobje	Dobrepolje	Dobrna	Dobrova–P. Gradec	Dobrovnik
Franc Leskovšek (SLS)	Janez Pavlin (GV)	Martin Brecl (SLS)	Jure Dolinar (GV)	Marjan Kardinar (GV)
Dol pri Ljubljani	Dolenjske Toplice	Dornava	Dravograd	Duplek
Željko Savič (GV)	Franc Vovk (GV)	Matej Zorko (SDS)	Anton Preskavec (GV)	Mitja Horvat (GV)
Gorenja vas – Poljane	Gorišnica	Gorje	Gornja Radgona	Gornji Grad
Milan Čadež (SDS)	Borut Kolar (GV)	Peter Torkar (GV)	Urška Mauko Tuš (GV)	Anton Špeh (GV)
Gornji Petrovci	Grad	Hajdina	Hoče – Slivnica	Hodoš
Franc Šlighthuber (NSi)	Cvetka Ficko (GV)	Stanislav Glažar (COA)	Marko Soršak (ZZ)	Denis Tamaško (GV)
Horjul	Hrastnik	Hrpelje – Kozina	Idrija	Ig
Janko Prebil (NSi)	Marko Funkl (GV)	Saša L. Svetelšek (GV)	Tomaž Vencelj (GV)	Zlatko Usenik (LZU)
Ilirska Bistrica	Ivančna Gorica	Izola	Jezersko	Juršinci
Gregor Kovačič (GV)	Dušan Strnad (SDS)	Milan Bogatič (GV)	Andrej Karničar (GV)	Robert Horvat (GV)
Kanal ob Soči	Kidričevo	Kobarid	Kobilje	Kočevje
Miha Stegel (GV)	Anton Leskovar (SDS)	Marko Matajurc (GV)	Darko Horvat (SLS)	Vladimir Prebilič (GV)
Komen	Komenda	Kostanjevica na Krki	Kostel	Kozje
Erik Modic (GV)	Jurij Kern (GV)	Robert Zagorc (GV)	Nataša Turk (GV)	Milena Kranjc (GV)
Kranjska Gora	Križevci	Kungota	Kuzma	Laško
Henrika Zupan (GV)	Branko Slavinec (GV)	Tamara Šnofl (GV)	Jožef Škalič (GV)	Marko Šantej (GV)
Lenart	Lendava	Litija	Ljubno	Ljutomer
Janez Kramberger (GV)	Janez Magyar (SDS)	Franc Rokavec (SLS)	Franjo Naraločnik (GV)	Olga Karba (GV)
Logatec	Log – Dragomer	Loška dolina	Loški Potok	Lovrenc na Pohorju
Berto Menard (GV)	Miran Stanovnik (GV)	Matjaž Antončič (NaNo)	Simon Debeljak (GV)	Marko Rakovnik (GV)
Luče	Lukovica	Majšperk	Makole	Markovci
Klavdij Strmčnik (GV)	Olga Vrankar (GV)	Sašo Kodrič (SLS)	Franc Majcen (GV)	Milan Gabrovec (LDS)
Medvode	Mengeš	Metlika	Mežica	Miklavž na Dr. polju
Nejc Smole (GV)	Bogo Ropotar (GV)	M. L. Janžekovič (GV)	Mark Maze (GV)	Egon Repnik (LSO)
Miren – Kostanjevica	Mirna	Mirna Peč	Mislinja	Mokronog – Trebelno
Mauricij Humar (GV)	Dušan Skerbiš (GV)	Andrej Kastelic (GV)	Bojan Borovnik (SD)	Franc Glušič (GV)
Moravče	Moravske Toplice	Mozirje	Muta	Naklo
Milan Balažic (SLS)	Aloj Glavač (GV)	Ivan Suhoveršnik (GV)	Angela Mrak (GV)	Ivan Meglič (SLS)
Nazarje	Odranci	Oplotnica	Ormož	Osilnica
Matej Pečovnik (GV)	Barbara Ferenčak (GV)	Matjaž Orter (GV)	Danijel Vrbnjak (SDS)	Alenka Kovač (FM)
Pesnica	Piran	Pivka	Podčetrtek	Podlehnik
Gregor Žmak (GV)	Andrej Korenika (GV)	Robert Smrdelj (SLS)	Peter Misja (GV)	Sebastian Toplak (GV)
Podvelka	Poljčane	Polzela	Postojna	Prebold
Miran Pušnik (GV)	Petra Vrhovnik (GV)	Jože Kužnik (GV)	Igor Marentič (GV)	Marko Repnik (SD)
Preddvor	Prevalje	Puconci	Rače – Fram	Radeče
Rok Roblek (GV)	Matija Tasič (GV)	Uroš Kamenšek (SLS)	Branko Ledinek (SLS)	Tomaž Režun (SD)
Radenci	Radlje ob Dravi	Radovljica	Ravne na Koroškem	Razkrižje
Roman Leljak (GV)	Alan Bukovnik (GV)	Ciril Globočnik (GV)	Tomaž Rožen (GV)	Stanko Ivanušič (GV)
Rečica ob Savinji	Renče – Vogrsko	Ribnica	Ribnica na Pohorju	Rogaška Slatina
Majda Potočnik (NSi)	Tarik Žigon (LZV)	Samo Pogorelc (GV)	Srečko Geč (SD)	Branko Kidrič (NSi)
Rogašovci	Rogatec	Ruše	Selnica ob Dravi	Semič
Rihard Perauča (GV)	Martin Mikolič (NSi)	Urška Repolusk (GV)	Vlasta Krmelj (SDS)	Polona Kambič (GV)
Sevnica	Sežana	Slovenske Konjice	Sodražica	Solčava
Srečko Ocvirk (SLS)	Andrej Sila (GV)	Darko Ratajc (SD)	Blaž Milavec (NSi)	Katarina Prelesnik (GV)
Središče ob Dravi	Starše	Straža	Sveta Ana	Sveta Trojica v Sl. gor.
Toni Jelovica (GV)	Stanko Greifoner (GV)	Dušan Krštinc (GV)	Martin Breznik (SV)	David Klobasa (NSi)
Sveti Andraž v Sl. gor.	Sveti Jurij ob Ščavnici	Sveti Jurij v Slov. gor.	Sveti Tomaž	Šalovci
Darja V. Berlak (GV)	Andrej Vrzel (GV)	Peter Škrlec (SDS)	Mirko Cvetko (NSi)	Iztok Fartek (GV)
Šempeter – Vrtojba	Šenčur	Šentilj	Šentjernej	Šentjur
Milan Turk (GV)	Ciril Kozjek (NSi + SDS)	David Kos (GV)	Jože Simončič (GV)	Marko Diaci (GV)
Šentrupert	Škocjan	Škofljica	Šmarje pri Jelšah	Šmarješke Toplice
Tomaž Ramovš (GV)	Jože Kapler (SDS)	Primož Cimerman (GV)	Matija Čakš (GV)	Marjan Hribar (GV)
Šmartno ob Paki	Šmartno pri Litiji	Šoštanj	Štore	Tabor
Janko Kopušar (GV)	Blaž Izlakar (GV)	Boris Goličnik (LBG)	Miran Jurkošek (GV)	Marko Semprimožnik (GV)
Tišina	Tolmin	Trbovlje	Trebnje	Trnovska vas
Franc Horvat (SLS)	Alen Červ (SD)	Zoran Poznič (SD)	Mateja Povhe (DROT)	Alojz Benko (SLS)
Trzin	Tržič	Turnišče	Velika Polana	Velike Lašče
Peter Ložar (GV)	Peter Miklič (GV)	Borut Horvat (SDS)	Damijan Jaklin (GV)	Matjaž Hočevar (GV)
Veržej	Videm	Vipava	Vitanje	Vodice
Drago Legen (GV)	Brane Kolednik (SMS)	Anton Lavrenčič (GV)	Andraž Pogorevc (GV)	Aco Franc Šuštar (GV)
Vojnik	Vransko	Vrhnika	Vuzenica	Zagorje ob Savi
Branko Petre (NSi + SDS)	Nataša Juhart(NSi	Daniel Cukjati (GV)	Franjo Golob (GV)	Matjaž Švagan
Zavrč	Zreče	Železniki	Žetale	Žiri
Slavko Pravdič (NSi)	Boris Podvršnik SDS)	Marko Gasser (GV)	Anton Butolen (GV)	Franc Kranjc (GV)
Žirovnica				Žužemberk
Leopold Pogačar (GV)				Jože Papež (NSi)

== Elections in city municipalities ==
=== Ljubljana ===
89,405 votes (39.98%)

Rank	Candidates	Party	Percent
1st round
1	Zoran Janković	Jože Mermal with a group of voters	61.83 %
2	Nataša Sukič	The Left	9.61 %
3	Aleš Primc	Voice for Children and Families	6.95 %
4	Igor Horvat	Slovenian Democratic Party	6.28 %
5	Tina Bregant	Slovenian People's Party and Our Country	5.96 %
6	Mojca Sojar	New Slovenia	3.19 %
7	Jasminka Dedić	Vesna – Green Party	3.16 %
8	Tomaž Ogrin	Greens of Slovenia and Concretely	1.67 %
9	Jasmin Feratović	Pirate Party	1.62 %

=== Maribor ===
1R – 36,011 votes (41.21%)
2R –

Rank	Candidates	Party	Percent
1st round
1	Saša Arsenovič	Andrej Brvar with a group of voters	36.69 %
2	Franc Kangler	New People's Party of Slovenia	25.46 %
3	Vojko Flis	Freedom Movement	20.29 %
4	Dejan Kaloh	New Slovenia	4.27 %
5	Lidija Divjak Mirnik	List for Justice and Development	3.87 %
6	Boštjan Klun	Social Democrats	2.13 %
7	Josip Rotar	List of Cyclists and Pedestrians	1.31 %
8	Vladimir Šega	The Left	1.14 %
9	Igor Jurišič	Youth Party – European Greens	0.97 %
10	Bernard Memon	New Slovenia	0.96 %
11	Aleksander Kamenik	Aleksander Kamenik Party	0.74 %
12	Matic Matjašič	Youth List. We Connect	0.65 %
13	Nina Beyokol	Pirate Party	0.57 %
14	Miha Recek	Slovenian People's Party and Our Country	0.54 %
15	Franc Jesenek	Party of Slovenian People	0.44 %
2nd round
1	Saša Arsenovič	Andrej Brvar with a group of voters	
2	Franc Kangler	New People's Party of Slovenia	

=== Kranj ===
1R – 18,867 votes (42.24%)
2R –

Rank	Candidates	Party	Percent
1st round
1	Matjaž Rakovec	Social Democrats	48.23 %
2	Ivo Bajec	SDS, SLS, NSi and Greens of Slovenia	19.50 %
3	Zoran Stevanović	Resni.ca	17.42 %
4	Aleksander Svetelj	More for Kranj	7.67 %
5	Srečko Barbič	Freedom Movement	4.00 %
6	Igor Velov	List for the Development of Kranj	3.19 %
2nd round
1	Matjaž Rakovec	Social Democrats	
2	Ivo Bajec	SDS, SLS, NSi and Greens of Slovenia	

=== Koper ===
22,989 votes (53.86%)

Rank	Candidates	Party	Percent
1st round
1	Aleš Bržan	Aleš Bržan List and Freedom Movement	53.60 %
2	Boris Popovič	Koper Is Ours	37.69 %
3	Igor Colja	Slovenian Democratic Party	2.55 %
4	Peter Bolčič	Trust	2.51 %
5	Jadranka Šturm Kocjan	Social Democrats	2.03 %
6	Alan Medveš	The Left	1.61 %

=== Celje ===
1R – 16,310 votes (41.50%)
2R –

Rank	Candidates	Party	Percent
1st round
1	Bojan Šrot	Mayor's Celje List	46.86 %
2	Matija Kovač	Gregor Deleja with a group of voters	33.14 %
3	Uroš Lesjak	Freedom Movement	9.41 %
4	Sandi Sendelbah	List for Celje	6.25 %
5	Primož Brvar	Social Democrats	4.34 %
2nd round
1	Bojan Šrot	Mayor's Celje List	
2	Matija Kovač	Gregor Deleja with a group of voters	

=== Novo mesto ===
12,909 votes (43.81%)

Rank	Candidates	Party	Percent
1st round
1	Gregor Macedoni	Boštjan Grobler with a group of voters	74.51 %
2	Srečko Vovko	Social Democrats	25.49 %

=== Velenje ===
12,533 votes (47.35%)

Rank	Candidates	Party	Percent
1st round
1	Peter Dermol	Social Democrats	68.84 %
2	Milan Medved	Herman Arlič with a group of voters	16.97 %
3	Lidija Črnko	Freedom Movement	6.06 %
4	Benjamin Strozak	Good Country	4.22 %
5	Jože Hribar	Our Velenje	2.40 %
6	Lidija Šolinc	Resni.ca	1.51 %

=== Nova Gorica ===
1R – 11,918 votes (46.08%)
2R –

Rank	Candidates	Party	Percent
1st round
1	Samo Turel	Freedom Movement	40.78 %
2	Klemen Miklavič	Majda Smrekar with a group of voters	25.85 %
3	Damjana Pavlica	Slovenian Democratic Party	14.86 %
4	Tomaž Horvat	Social Democrats	9.14 %
5	Anton Harej	New Slovenia	7.17 %
6	Andreja Pelicon	The Left	2.21 %
2nd round
1	Samo Turel	Freedom Movement	
2	Klemen Miklavič	Majda Smrekar with a group of voters	

=== Krško ===
1R – 9,855 votes (47.00%)
2R –

Rank	Candidates	Party	Percent
1st round
1	Dušan Šiško	Dejan Stanič with a group of voters (Dušan Šiško List – Energic for Krško)	24.61 %
2	Janez Kerin	Marta Levičar Magiera with a group of voters (Blue Direction List)	19.75 %
3	Aleš Zorko	Freedom Movement	18.75 %
4	Iztok Starc	Slovenian People's Party	17.22 %
5	Jože Olovec	Slovenian Democratic Party	9.86 %
6	Janja Starc	Dušan Arh with a group of voters	9.81 %
2nd round
1	Dušan Šiško	Dejan Stanič with a group of voters (Dušan Šiško List – Energic for Krško)	
2	Janez Kerin	Marta Levičar Magiera with a group of voters (Blue Direction List)	

=== Ptuj ===
9,138 votes (47.64%)

Rank	Candidates	Party	Percent
1st round
1	Nuška Gajšek	Social Democrats	64.28 %
2	Andrej Čuš	Milan Klemenc and a group of voters	16.14 %
3	Franjo Rozman	Slovenian Democratic Party	8.69 %
4	Štefan Petek	Freedom Movement	5.02 %
5	Boštjan Koražija	The Left	1.98 %
6	Robert Križanič	Resni.ca and For a Healthy Society	1.83 %
7	Suzana Lara Krause	Slovenian People's Party	1.74 %
8	Andrej Lacko	Slovenian National Party	0.32 %

=== Murska Sobota ===
1R – 8,098 votes (51.15%)
2R –

Rank	Candidates	Party	Percent
1st round
1	Damjan Anželj	Social Democrats	41.86 %
2	Andrej Mešič	Slovenian Democratic Party	32.72 %
3	Mitja Horvat	Freedom Movement	23.09 %
4	Blanka Denko Čeh	Akacije	2.34 %
2nd round
1	Damjan Anželj	Social Democrats	
2	Andrej Mešič	Slovenian Democratic Party	

=== Slovenj Gradec ===
6,398 votes (46.00%)

Rank	Candidates	Party	Percent
1st round
1	Tilen Klugler	Metka Č. Golež with a group of voters	100,00 %

== Statistics ==
=== General ===
Mayor candidates		Council member candidates	
Total	618	Total	18,671
Women	107	Women	8,478
Men	511	Men	10,193
City municipalities	74	City municipalities	3,446
Rest of municipalities	544	Rest of municipalities	15,225
Oldest	82	Oldest	94
Youngest	22	Youngest	18
Elected mayors		Elected council members	
Total	212	Total	3,382
Women		Women	
Men		Men	
Oldest		Oldest	
Youngest		Youngest	
Highest support % (municipality)		Most members by municipality	
Lowest support % (municipality)		Least members by municipality	
Mayor mandates		Participation	
8th mandate in the office		1st round – Percentage (%)	
7th mandate in the office	1	1st round – Total votes	
6th mandate in the office		1st round – Valid votes	
5th mandate in the office		1st round – Invalid votes	
4th mandate in the office		2nd round – Percentage (%)	
3rd mandate in the office		2nd round – Total votes	
2nd mandate in the office		2nd round – Valid votes	
1st mandate in the office		2nd round – Invalid votes	

=== Elected mayor candidates by parties / lists ===
Rank	Logo	Suggested by	Candidates	Elected		
Rank	Logo	Suggested by	Candidates	1st round	2nd round	Total
1		Non–party candidates with voters support (GV)	270	103	34	137
2		Slovenian People's Party (SLS)	34	13	2	15
3		Social Democrats (SD)	53	10	4	14
4		Slovenian Democratic Party (SDS)	61	11	1	12
5		New Slovenia (NSi)	34	11	0	11
6		Candidates with coalition support (Note: 15 mayor candidates have coalition support of at least two or more parties (lists)ː Svoboda + Levica + SD + DeSUS (BREŽICE) SDS + SLS drugačni in povezani (DESTRNIK) SDS + Nsi (GROSUPLJE) SDS + SD + SLS (HAJDINA) Lista Mateja Slaparja + NSi + podpora volivcev (KAMNIK) Lista Aleša Bržana + Svoboda (KOPER) SDS + NSi + SLS + Zeleni Slovenije (KRANJ) SDS + NSi (LENDAVA) Zeleni Slovenije + Konkretno (LJUBLJANA) SLS + Naša dežela (MARIBOR) SLS + SDS + NSi + DeSUS (SL. BISTRICA) SLS + SDS (ŠENČUR) SD + skupina volivcev (VELENJE) NSi + SDS (VOJNIK) SDS + NSi (ŽIRI))	15	7	2	9
7		Freedom Movement (GS)	1	1	2	3
		Our Inner Carniola (NaNo)	4	1	—	1
		Liberal Democracy of Slovenia (LDS)	2	1	—	1
		Youth Party – European Greens (SMS)	2	1	—	1
		Zagorje Goes Forward	1	1	—	1
		We Know! We Can!. Marko Soršak.	1	1	—	1
		Boris Goličnik List	1	1	—	1
		List For You	1	1	—	1
		Common Miklavž na Dravskem Polju Municipality List	1	1	—	1
		Drot – For Development	1	0	1	1
		Zlatko Usenik List For Progress of the Municipality of Ig	1	0	1	1
		Renata Kosec List (Connection and Cooperation List)	1	1	—	1
19		New People's Party of Slovenia (NLS)	2	0	—	0
		Mayor's List for Our Jesenice	1	0	—	0
		Mayor's List of Izola (IŽL)	1	0	—	0
		Mayor of Celje List	1	0	—	0
23		The Left (L)	13	0	—	0
		Resni.ca	9	0	—	0
		Vesna – Green Party	6	0	—	0
		Slovenian National Party (SNS)	6	0	—	0
		Greens of Slovenia (ZS)	4	0	—	0
		Pirate Party (Pirates)	2	0	—	0
		Slovenia Forward (NPS)	2	0	—	0
		Good Country (DD)	2	0	—	0
		Party of Slovenian People (SSN)	2	0	—	0
		Democratic Party of Pensioners of Slovenia (DeSUS)	1	0	—	0
		LESK Voters List	1	0	—	0
		For People of Slovenia (ZLS)	1	0	—	0
		Association for Slovene Littoral (ZZP)	1	0	—	0
		Olive	1	0	—	0
		Concretely	1	0	—	0
		Voice for Children and Families	1	0	—	0
		Socialist Party of Slovenia (SPS)	1	0	—	0
		Koper Is Ours (KJN)	1	0	—	0
		DNK Trbovlje List	1	0	—	0
		Sandi Jaklič List	1	0	—	0
		Aleksander Kamenik List	1	0	—	0
		Cyclists and Pedestrians List	1	0	—	0
		Youth List. We Connect.	1	0	—	0
		Independent List for Improvement of Jesenice	1	0	—	0
		Mitja Kobal List (IŽL)	1	0	—	0
		Vasilij Žbogar List	1	0	—	0
		LTD Toni Dragar – List For All Generations	1	0	—	0
		Igor Zupančič List	1	0	—	0
		Utility Eco List	1	0	—	0
		United – Independent List for Prevalje	1	0	—	0
		Moravška dolina United	1	0	—	0
		Active List	1	0	—	0
		Movement for the Municipality of Piran (GZOP)	1	0	—	0
		More for Kranj	1	0	—	0
		Our Velenje	1	0	—	0
		List for Celje	1	0	—	0
		Acacia Party	1	0	—	0
		Dialogue for Progress	1	0	—	0
		Style	1	0	—	0
		Trust	1	0	—	0
		Together for Mengeš Municipality (SMO) (Together We Can Do More)	1	0	—	0
.		List for Fair Development (of city districts and local communities)	1	0	—	0
Total			618	165	47	212
