= Zgornja Kapla =

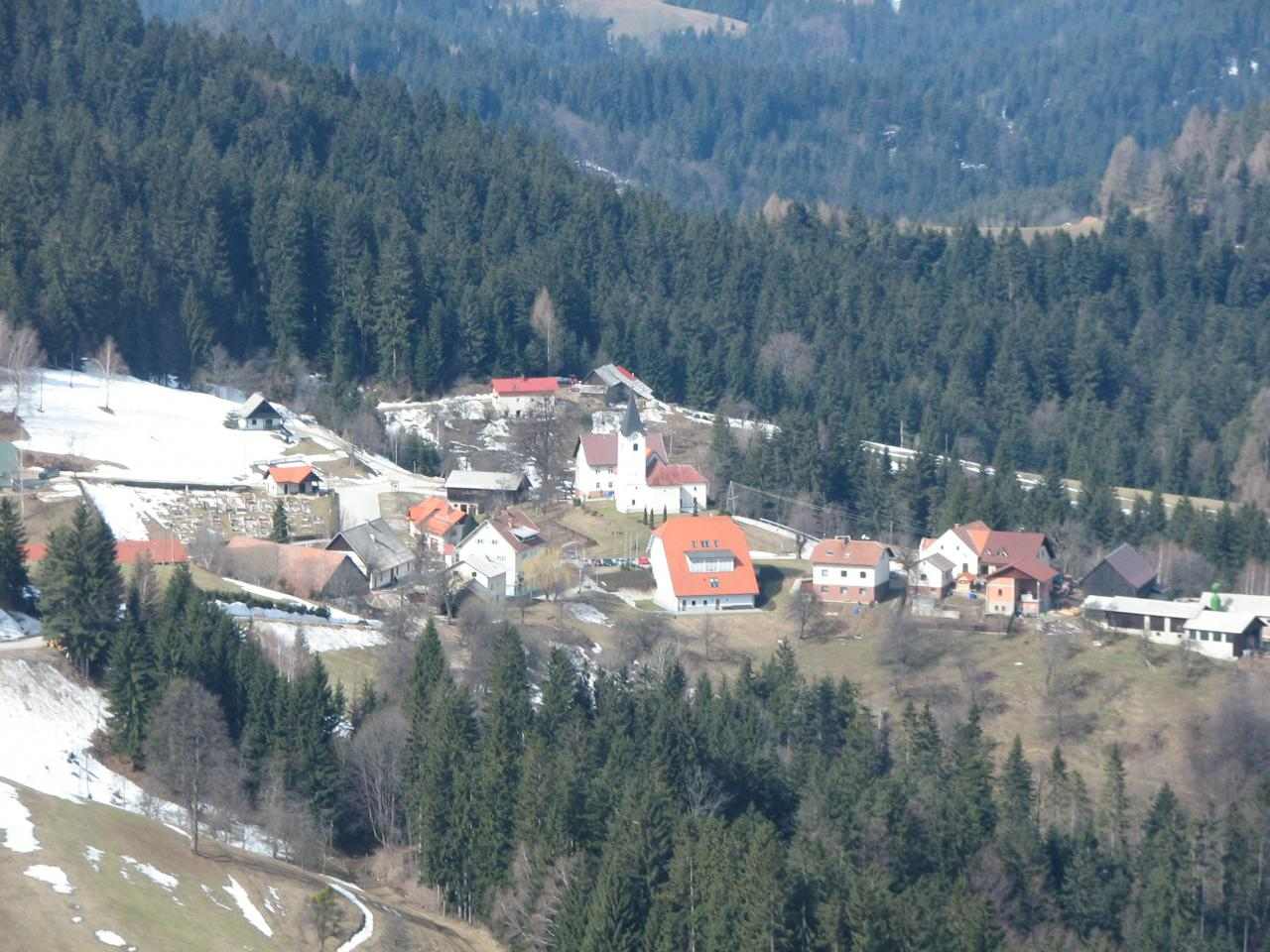

- Location in Slovenia
- Coordinates: 46°37′47.49″N 15°21′37.2″E
- Country: Slovenia
- Traditional region: Styria
- Statistical region: Carinthia
- Municipality: Podvelka

Area
  - Total: 13.87 km^{2} (5.36 sq mi)
- Elevation: 828.5 m (2,718 ft)

Population (2002)
  - Total: 200

Zgornja Kapla (pronounced [ˈzɡoːrnja ˈkaːpla]) is a dispersed settlement in the hills north of the Drava River in the Municipality of Podvelka in Slovenia, on the border with Austria.

== Name ==
The name Zgornja Kapla literally means 'upper Kapla', distinguishing the settlement from neighboring Spodnja Kapla (literally, 'lower Kapla'). Like other settlements named Kapla (e.g., Kapla in the Municipality of Tabor) and similar names (e.g., Kaplja vas, Kapljišče, and Železna Kapla in Austria), the name is derived from the Slovene common noun *kapla 'chapel' (< *kapela < MHG and OHG kappella < Latin cappella 'chapel'), referring to a local religious structure.

== Mass graves ==
Zgornja Kapla is the site of three known mass graves or clandestine graves associated with the Second World War. All of the victims were murdered in May 1945 by the Jože Lacko Detachment of the Partisan forces. The Zgornji Pavlič Mass Grave (Slovene: Grobišče Zgornji Pavlič) is located in the woods about 100 meters (330 ft) south of the Zgornji Pavlič farm (at Zgornja Kapla no. 16). It contains the remains of about 45 Hungarian civilians. The Pušnik Chapel-Shrine Grave (Grobišče pri Pušnikovi kapeli) is located about 150 meters (490 ft) northeast of the Kure farm (Zgornja Kapla no. 65). It contains the remains of a Slovene that was murdered because he had been mobilized into the German military. The Sršen 3 Grave (Grobišče Sršenovo 3) lies on the edge of a woods about 130 meters (430 ft) below the abandoned farm at Zgornja Kapla no. 57 and 200 meters (660 ft) east of the Stojan farm. It contains the remains of a person murdered on suspicion of being an informant.

== Church ==
The parish church in the settlement is dedicated to Saint Catherine and belongs to the Roman Catholic Archdiocese of Maribor. It is first mentioned in written documents dating to 1389. The current building dates to after 1813, when the old church burned down.
