= Zgornji Kozji Vrh =

- Location in Slovenia
- Coordinates: 46°35′53.79″N 15°15′51.56″E
- Country: Slovenia
- Traditional region: Styria
- Statistical region: Carinthia
- Municipality: Radlje ob Dravi

Area
  - Total: 2.87 km^{2} (1.11 sq mi)
- Elevation: 333.5 m (1,094 ft)

Population (2002)
  - Total: 154

Zgornji Kozji Vrh (pronounced [ˈzɡoːɾnji ˈkoːzji ˈʋəɾx]) is a small dispersed settlement in the hills above the left bank of the Drava River in the Municipality of Radlje ob Dravi in Slovenia.

== History ==
Zgornji Kozji Vrh was created as a separate settlement in 1994, when it was administratively separated from Kozji Vrh in the neighboring Municipality of Podvelka.
