= Spodnja Kapla =

- Location in Slovenia
- Coordinates: 46°38′21.95″N 15°24′13.08″E
- Country: Slovenia
- Traditional region: Styria
- Statistical region: Carinthia
- Municipality: Podvelka

Area
  - Total: 16.71 km^{2} (6.45 sq mi)
- Elevation: 526.6 m (1,728 ft)

Population (2002)
  - Total: 380

Spodnja Kapla (pronounced [ˈspoːdnja ˈkaːpla]) is a dispersed settlement in the hills north of the Drava River in the Municipality of Podvelka in Slovenia, close to the border with Austria.

== Name ==
The name Spodnja Kapla literally means 'lower Kapla', distinguishing the settlement from neighboring Zgornja Kapla (literally, 'upper Kapla'). Like other settlements named Kapla (e.g., Kapla in the Municipality of Tabor) and similar names (e.g., Kaplja vas, Kapljišče, and Železna Kapla in Austria), the name is derived from the Slovene common noun *kapla 'chapel' (< *kapela < MHG and OHG kappella < Latin cappella 'chapel'), referring to a local religious structure.

== Mass graves ==
Spodnja Kapla is the site of three known mass graves or clandestine graves associated with the Second World War. They all contain the remains of victims murdered in May 1945 by the Jože Lacko Detachment of the Partisan forces. The Četrtnik Cross Mass Grave (Slovene: Grobišče četrtnikov križ) is located at the Četrtnik farm in the southern part of the settlement. It contains the remains of a family of five from Ruše that was murdered because the head of the family was suspected of being an informant. The Breznik Chapel-Shrine Mass Grave (Slovene: Grobišče pri Breznikovi kapeli) lies behind a chapel-shrine about 250 meters (820 ft) west of the Breznik farm (at Spodnja Kapla no. 43). It contains the remains six people murdered on suspicion of being informants. The Sršen Grave (Slovene: Grobišče Sršenovo)—also known as the Sršen Shack Grave (Grobišče Sršenova koča), Pekel Grave (Grobišče Pekel), or Spodnji Krampl Grave (Grobišče Spodnji Krampl)—is located about 150 meters (490 ft) southwest of the house at the Spodnji Krampl farm (at Spodnja Kapla no. 19). It contains the remains of an Austrian murdered on suspicion of being an informant.

== Notable people ==
- Zinka Zorko (1936–2019), linguist and academic
