= Zgornji Janževski Vrh =

- Location in Slovenia
- Coordinates: 46°33′23.01″N 15°17′1.72″E
- Country: Slovenia
- Traditional region: Styria
- Statistical region: Carinthia
- Municipality: Ribnica na Pohorju

Area
  - Total: 2.06 km^{2} (0.80 sq mi)
- Elevation: 700.1 m (2,297 ft)

Population (2002)
  - Total: 33

Zgornji Janževski Vrh (pronounced [ˈzɡoːɾnji ˈjaːnʒɛu̯ski ˈʋəɾx]) is a small dispersed settlement in the Pohorje Hills in northeastern Slovenia. It lies in the Municipality of Ribnica na Pohorju. The area is part of the traditional Styria region. The municipality is now included in the Carinthia Statistical Region.

== History ==
Zgornji Janževski Vrh was established as a separate settlement in 1994, when it was split off from Janževski Vrh in the neighboring Municipality of Podvelka.
