= Zgornji Lehen na Pohorju =

- Location in Slovenia
- Coordinates: 46°32′9.01″N 15°18′3.28″E
- Country: Slovenia
- Traditional region: Styria
- Statistical region: Carinthia
- Municipality: Ribnica na Pohorju

Area
  - Total: 6.94 km^{2} (2.68 sq mi)
- Elevation: 611.5 m (2,006 ft)

Population (2002)
  - Total: 112

Zgornji Lehen na Pohorju (pronounced [ˈzɡóːɾnji ˈlèːxən na ˈpóːxɔɾju]) is a dispersed settlement in the Municipality of Ribnica na Pohorju in northeastern Slovenia. It comprises a number of relatively isolated farmsteads in the Pohorje Hills. The area is part of the traditional Styria region, and it is now included in the Carinthia Statistical Region.

== History ==
Zgornji Lehen na Pohorju was established as a separate settlement in 1994, when it was split off from Lehen na Pohorju in the neighboring Municipality of Podvelka.
