= Radelca =

- Location in Slovenia
- Coordinates: 46°38′32.95″N 15°17′10.4″E
- Country: Slovenia
- Traditional region: Styria
- Statistical region: Carinthia
- Municipality: Radlje ob Dravi

Area
  - Total: 5.93 km^{2} (2.29 sq mi)
- Elevation: 851.2 m (2,793 ft)

Population (2002)
  - Total: 99

Radelca (pronounced [ˈɾaːdɛltsa]) is a dispersed settlement in the hills north of the Drava River in the Municipality of Radlje ob Dravi in Slovenia, right on the border with Austria.

There are two churches in the hills above the settlement. The one closest to the border with Austria is dedicated to Saint Pancras and was first mentioned in written documents dating to 1490. It was rebuilt in 1655 and has a rectangular nave with a polygonal apse and a belfry on its southern facade. The second church is dedicated to Saint Urban and dates to the mid-17th century. Both belong to the Parish of Remšnik.
