= Spodnja Orlica =

- Location in Slovenia
- Coordinates: 46°33′42.09″N 15°14′58.79″E
- Country: Slovenia
- Traditional region: Styria
- Statistical region: Carinthia
- Municipality: Radlje ob Dravi

Area
  - Total: 7.06 km^{2} (2.73 sq mi)
- Elevation: 612 m (2,008 ft)

Population (2002)
  - Total: 115

Spodnja Orlica (pronounced [ˈspoːdnja ˈoːɾlitsa]) is a dispersed settlement in the Pohorje Hills south of Vuhred in the Municipality of Radlje ob Dravi in Slovenia.

== History ==
Spodnja Orlica was established as a separate settlement in 1994, when the former village of Orlica was split into Spodnja Orlica and Zgornja Orlica (in the neighboring Municipality of Ribnica na Pohorju).
