= Vas, Radlje ob Dravi =

Vas
- Location in Slovenia
- Coordinates: 46°37′32.16″N 15°16′30.12″E
- Country: Slovenia
- Traditional region: Styria
- Statistical region: Carinthia
- Municipality: Radlje ob Dravi

Area
  - Total: 5.8 km^{2} (2.2 sq mi)
- Elevation: 549.6 m (1,803 ft)

Population (2002)
  - Total: 430

Vas (pronounced [ˈʋaːs]) is a settlement with a compact core on the left bank of the Drava River and extending into the hills towards Remšnik to the north in the Municipality of Radlje ob Dravi in Slovenia.
