= St. Ignatius of Loyola Church, Rdeči Breg =

St. Ignatius of Loyola Church
- Cerkev sv. Ignacija Lojolskega
- St. Ignatius of Loyola Church
- 46.56694444°N 15.33694444°E
- Location: Rdeči Breg
- Country: Slovenia
- Denomination: Roman Catholic

History
- Status: filial church pilgrimage church
- Dedication: Ignatius of Loyola

Architecture
- Functional status: active
- Style: Baroque
- Groundbreaking: 1759

Specifications
- Length: 22.05 m
- Width: 7.05 m
- Height: 11 m
- Materials: Came

Administration
- Metropolis: Maribor
- Archdiocese: Maribor
- Archdeaconry: Maribor Archdeanery
- Deanery: Maribor
- Parish: Lovrenc na Pohorju

The St. Ignatius of Loyola Church (Slovene: Cerkev sv. Ignacija Lojolskega) in Rdeči Breg (Municipality of Podvelka) is a filial church of the Parish of Lovrenc na Pohorje and a famous pilgrimage church.

The church is situated in a spacious clearing at an elevation of 887 meters above sea level, not far from Hlebov Vrh (913 m.n.m,), the highest point in the surrounding area.

== Rdeči Breg Educational Trail ==
The 6-kilometer-long Rdeči Breg Educational Trail begins at the church, which runs along the entire ridge and leads past Hleb's Well, one of the highest wells in Slovenia (880 m above sea level).

The church has a spacious nave, a semicircular presbytery, a sacristy added to the south side, and a low wooden bell tower covered with tin with an onion roof. The vaulted sanctuary is characteristic of Baroque style. In the presbytery, the barrel vault is decorated with frescoes of angels and a large IHS chronogram, which is very typical of the Jesuit order.
