= Šent Janž pri Radljah =

Šent Janž pri Radljah Suhi Vrh pri Radljah (1955–1993)
- Location in Slovenia
- Coordinates: 46°37′22.3″N 15°15′10.15″E
- Country: Slovenia
- Traditional region: Styria
- Statistical region: Carinthia
- Municipality: Radlje ob Dravi

Area
  - Total: 11.77 km^{2} (4.54 sq mi)
- Elevation: 548.3 m (1,799 ft)

Population (2002)
  - Total: 218

Šent Janž pri Radljah (pronounced [ˈʃɛnt ˈjaːnʃ pɾi ˈɾaːdljax]; German: Sankt Johann am Zeichenberge) is a dispersed settlement in the hills north of Radlje ob Dravi in Slovenia, located on the border with Austria.

== Name ==
The name of the settlement was changed from Šent Janž pri Radljah (literally, 'Saint John near Radlje') to Suhi Vrh pri Radljah (literally, 'dry peak near Radlje') in 1955. The name was changed on the basis of the 1948 Law on Names of Settlements and Designations of Squares, Streets, and Buildings as part of efforts by Slovenia's postwar communist government to remove religious elements from toponyms. The name Šent Janž pri Radljah was restored in 1993.

== Mahrenberg Castle ==
The ruins of Mahrenberg Castle lie on a hill south of the settlement. The castle was first mentioned in written documents dating to 1193 and was used until the Renaissance. In 1697 it burned down and only its polygonal foundations are preserved.
