= Sveti Trije Kralji, Radlje ob Dravi =

Sveti Trije Kralji Brezovec (1955–1993)
- Location in Slovenia
- Coordinates: 46°38′14.57″N 15°11′20.93″E
- Country: Slovenia
- Traditional region: Styria
- Statistical region: Carinthia
- Municipality: Radlje ob Dravi

Area
  - Total: 9.35 km^{2} (3.61 sq mi)
- Elevation: 761.6 m (2,499 ft)

Population (2002)
  - Total: 206

Sveti Trije Kralji (pronounced [ˈsʋeːti ˈtɾiːjɛ ˈkɾaːlji]) is a dispersed settlement in the hills northwest of Radlje ob Dravi in Slovenia, right on the border with Austria.

The settlement gets its name from the local church, dedicated to the Magi (Slovene: Sveti Trije Kralji). It belongs to the Parish of Radlje and was built in 1732.

== Name ==
The name of the settlement was changed from Sveti Trije Kralji to Brezovec (literally, 'place with birch trees') in 1955. The name was changed on the basis of the 1948 Law on Names of Settlements and Designations of Squares, Streets, and Buildings as part of efforts by Slovenia's postwar communist government to remove religious elements from toponyms. The name Sveti Trije Kralji was restored in 1993.
