= Bojan Šrot =

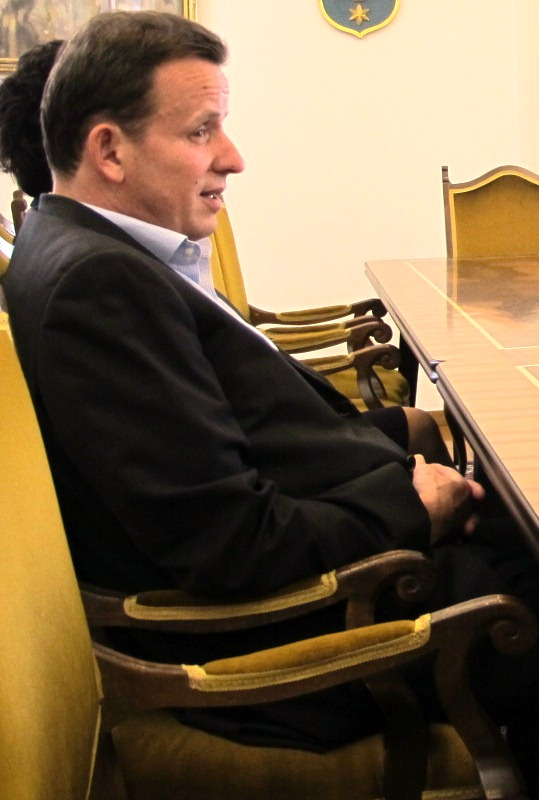

Mayor of Celje, Slovenia
- In office 1998–2022

Personal details
- Born: 9 February 1960 (age 66) Celje, SR Slovenia, SFR Yugoslavia (now Celje, Slovenia)
- Party: Slovenian People's Party
- Spouse: Katarina Karlovšek
- Education: University of Ljubljana (Faculty of Law)

Bojan Šrot (born 9 February 1960 in Celje, SR Slovenia, SFR Yugoslavia) is a Slovenian politician, judge, lawyer, and mountaineer. He served for six terms as Mayor of the City Municipality of Celje.

== Early life, education, and mountain climbing ==
Šrot was born in 1960 in Celje as the youngest of three sons. After primary school, he studied at First Grammar School in Celje and then at the Faculty of Law at the University of Ljubljana, where he graduated in 1985. 2018 he married with Katarina Karlovšek

During his studies, he was also actively involved in mountain climbing, noted as a top-status athlete in that sport. He was a member of several expeditions, including three in the Himalayas and Karakoram.

== Legal career ==
After university graduation, Šrot worked at the former Basic Court in Celje, passing the bar exam in 1989. He worked as a judge in Šmarje pri Jelšah until 1991; in autumn of that same year, he opened a law office and worked as a legal advocate for six years. In 1997, he worked as a State Secretary at the Ministry of Justice in Slovenia and the Deputy Minister of Justice, covering the area of judicial administration.

== Political career ==
In the local Slovenian elections of 1998, Šrot was elected mayor of Celje for the Slovenian People's Party. He was re-elected in 2002 with 56% of the vote, in 2006 for a third term, and in 2010 for a fourth term.

In 2003, during his term as Mayor, he became vice president of the Slovenian People's Party. On 17 November 2007, he became the president for that same party. He resigned as president on 24 March 2009.

In December 2022, Šrot lost against Matija Kovač in the second round of mayoral elections.
