= 2022 Ljubljana local elections =

Local elections

← 2018	20 November 2022	2026 →
- Mayoral election
- Turnout: 39.98% ▼5.12 pp
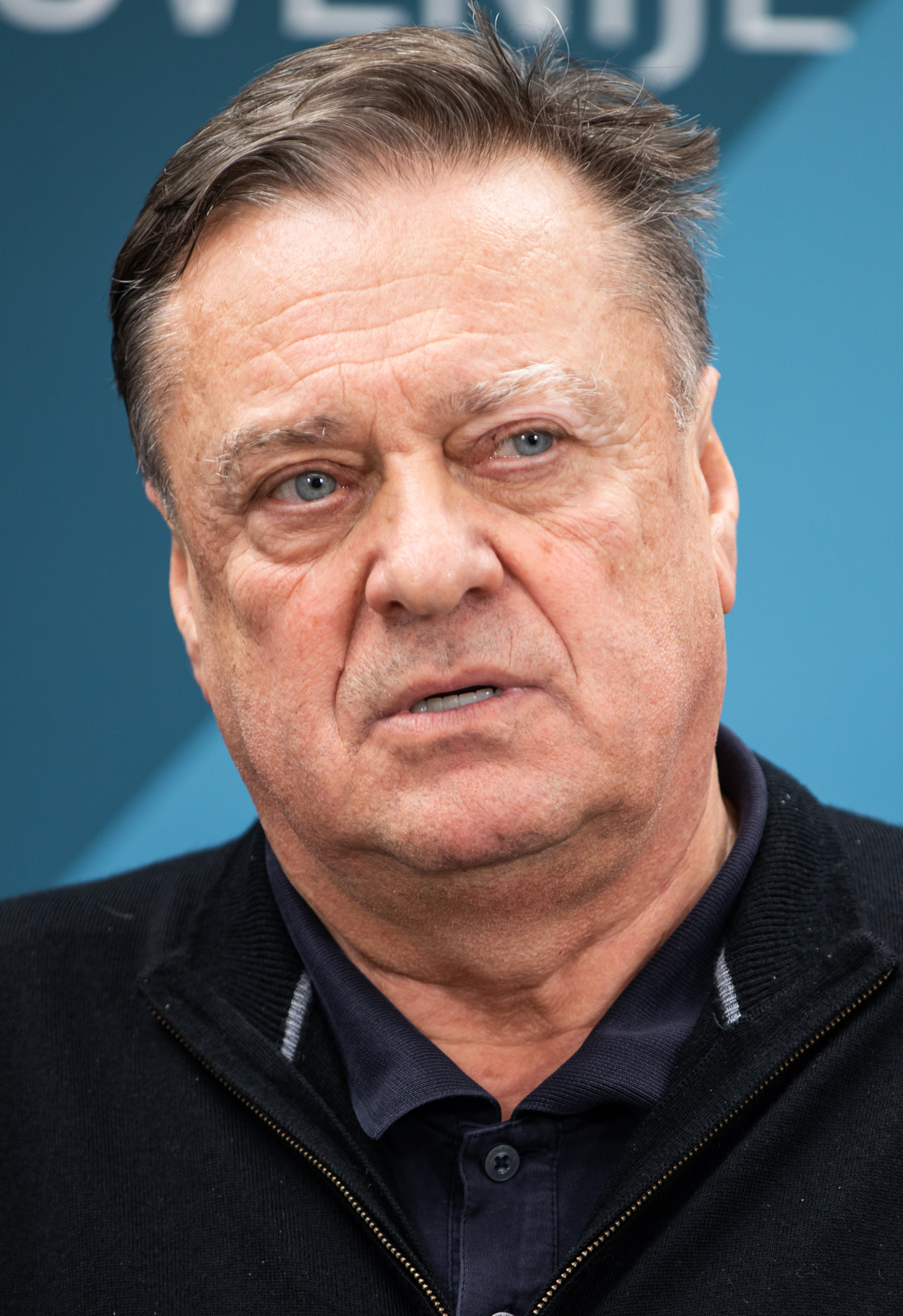
Candidate	Zoran Janković	Nataša Sukič
Party	Independent	The Left
Alliance	Zoran Janković List	The Left
Popular vote	54.680	8.495
Percentage	61,83%	9,61%
Mayor before election
Zoran Janković
Independent
Elected mayor
Zoran Janković
Independent
- Assembly election
- All 45 seats in the Ljubljana Assembly
Party	Leader	Vote %	Seats	+/–
LZJ	Zoran Janković	36,51	18	−5
GS	No mayoral candidate	15.96	8	+8
SDS	Igor Horvat	12.10	6	−4
The Left	Nataša Sukič	9.04	4	0
N.Si	Mojca Sojar	4.55	2	0
SD	No mayoral candidate	6.20	2	0
Vesna	Jasminka Dedić	3.73	1	+1
LŠZZ	No mayoral candidate	2.68	1	+1
GOD	Aleš Primc	2.60	1	+1
SLS	Tina Bregant	2.38	1	+1
Pirati	Jasmin Feratović	1.95	1	+1
This lists parties that won seats. See the complete results below.

Elections were held in Ljubljana on 20 November 2022 for the mayor of Ljubljana, the 45 members of the Ljubljana Assembly, the councils of districts and the local committees, as part of the 2022 Slovenian local elections.

== Background ==
Since the start of the campaign, and especially in November 2022, polling for mayor had consistently placed the current mayor, Zoran Janković, clearly in the lead, with 55-60 percent of the vote. Meanwhile, the candidate of Slovenia's biggest party by member size – the SDS, were well behind, as were the other candidates politician Nataša Sukič, and political activist Aleš Primc.

The first round of the mayoral election, held on 20 November 2022, was convincingly won by the current mayor Zoran Janković (with 61.83%), left-wing politician Nataša Sukič finished a distant second (with 9.61%). Furthermore, this was Janković's second worst ever result by number of votes, placing just ahead of mayoral elections in 2014.

Meanwhile, in the Assembly election, the Zoran Janković List won 18 of out the 45 seats, and later entered into a coalition with the centre-left Freedom Movement, which won 8 seats.

== Results ==
=== Mayoral election ===
Candidate	Party	Results		
Candidate	Party	Votes	%	+/-
Zoran Janković	Zoran Janković List	54.680	61,83	▲1,38%
Nataša Sukič	The Left	8.495	9,61	▲5,69%
Aleš Primc	Voice for Children and Families	6.148	6,95	N/A
Igor Horvat	Slovenian Democratic Party	5.552	6.28	▼23,22%
Tina Bregant	Slovenian People's Party	5.033	5,69	N/A
Mojca Sojar	New Slovenia	2.823	3,19	N/A
Jasminka Dedić	Vesna	2.796	3,16	N/A
Tomaž Ogrin	Greens of Slovenia-Concretely	1.481	1,67	▲0,20%
Jasmin Feratović	Pirate Party	1.431	1,62	N/A
Total		88,439	100,00%	

Votes to	Votes	%
Valid votes	88,439	98,92 %
Invalid/blank votes	966	1,08 %
Total votes	89.405	100,00 %
Registered voters/turnout	223,678	39,97 %

=== Assembly election ===
Party		Results			
Party		Votes	%	Seats	+/-
LZJ	Zoran Janković List	32.168	36,51	18 / 45	▼5
Svoboda	Freedom Movement	14.064	15,96	8 / 45	New
SDS	Slovenian Democratic Party	10.662	12.10	6 / 45	▼4
L	The Left	8.190	9,30	4 / 45	0
NSi	New Slovenia	4.007	4,55	2 / 45	0
SD	Social Democrats	3.572	4,05	2 / 45	0
Vesna	Vesna	3.286	3,73	1 / 45	New
LŠZZ	List for Sport and Health	2.359	2,68	1 / 45	▲1
GOD	Voice for Children and Families	2.295	2,60	1 / 45	▲1
SLS	Slovenian People's Party	2.098	2,38	1 / 45	▲1
Pirati	Pirate Party	1.721	1,95	1 / 45	▲1
LKP	List of Cyclists and Pedestrians	1.550	1,76	0 / 45	▼1
Resni.ca	Resni.ca	791	0,90	0 / 45	0
ZS + KON	Greens of Slovenia and Concretely	578	0,66	0 / 45	0
SNS	Slovenian National Party	272	0,31	0 / 45	0
DD	Good State	270	0,31	0 / 45	0
KSU	Christian Socialists	220	0,25	0 / 45	0

Votes to	Votes	%
Votes to elected parties	84.422	95,82 %
Votes to non-elected parties	3.681	4,18 %
Total votes	88.103	100,00 %

== Opinion Polls ==
Fieldwork date	Polling firm	Publisher(s)	Sample size	Janković	Sukič	Primc	Horvat	Bregant	Sojar	Dedić	Ogrin	Feratović	Lead	Source
20 Nov 2022	2022 Ljubljana local elections			61.83	9.61	6.95	6.28	5.69	3.19	3.16	1.67	1.62	52.22	—
11–14 Nov 2022	Ninamedia	Dnevnik, Večer	978	56.2	9.8	3.3	2.7	3.1	2.2	2.2	1.2	1.6	46.4	
