= Josipdol, Ribnica na Pohorju =

Josipdol
- Location in Slovenia
- Coordinates: 46°31′57.13″N 15°17′23.79″E
- Country: Slovenia
- Traditional region: Styria
- Statistical region: Carinthia
- Municipality: Ribnica na Pohorju

Area
  - Total: 3.55 km^{2} (1.37 sq mi)
- Elevation: 609.1 m (1,998 ft)

Population (2002)
  - Total: 330
- Climate: Dfb

Josipdol (pronounced [ˈjoːsipdɔl]) is a settlement in the Municipality of Ribnica na Pohorju in northeastern Slovenia. It lies in the Pohorje Hills in the upper valley of a small right tributary of the Drava River. The area is part of the traditional Styria region. It is now included in the Carinthia Statistical Region.

A quarry of local tonalite rock operates south of the settlement.
