= Hudi Kot =

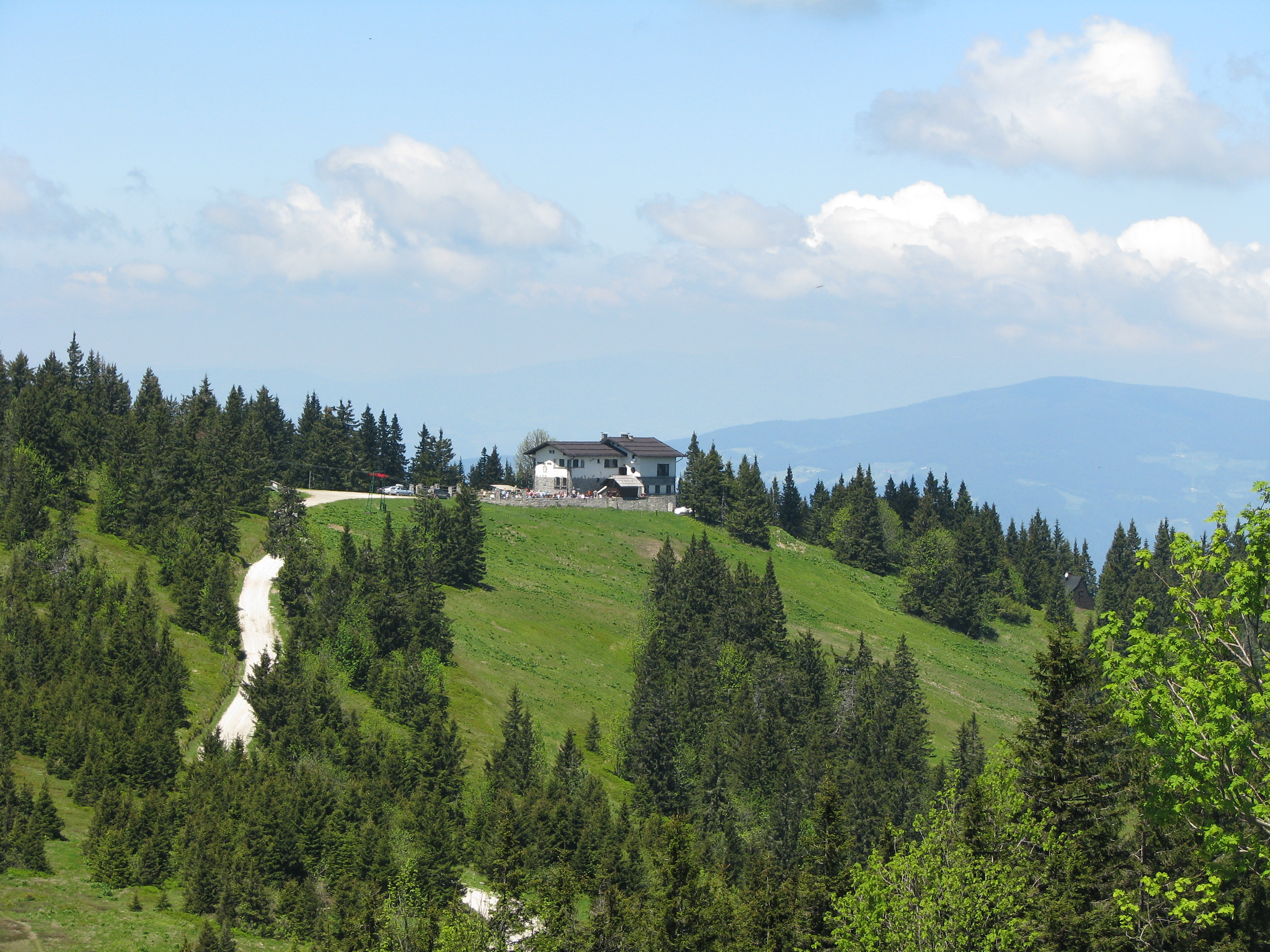

- Location in Slovenia
- Coordinates: 46°31′28.1″N 15°14′9.84″E
- Country: Slovenia
- Traditional region: Styria
- Statistical region: Carinthia
- Municipality: Ribnica na Pohorju

Area
  - Total: 35.46 km^{2} (13.69 sq mi)
- Elevation: 726.9 m (2,385 ft)

Population (2002)
  - Total: 268

Hudi Kot (pronounced [ˈxuːdi ˈkoːt]; German: Bösenwinkel) is a dispersed settlement in the Pohorje Hills in the Municipality of Ribnica na Pohorju in northeastern Slovenia. The area is part of the traditional region of Styria. It is now included in the Carinthia Statistical Region.

The local church is dedicated to Saint Wolfgang (Slovene: sveti Bolfenk) and belongs to the parish of Ribnica na Pohorju. It dates to the early 16th century.
