= Dobrava, Radlje ob Dravi =

Dobrava
- Location in Slovenia
- Coordinates: 46°35′56.37″N 15°13′26.84″E
- Country: Slovenia
- Traditional region: Styria
- Statistical region: Carinthia
- Municipality: Radlje ob Dravi

Area
  - Total: 3.48 km^{2} (1.34 sq mi)
- Elevation: 349.3 m (1,146 ft)

Population (2002)
  - Total: 199

Dobrava (pronounced [ˈdoːbɾaʋa]) is a settlement on the left bank of the Drava River in the Municipality of Radlje ob Dravi in Slovenia.

== See also ==
Dobrava (toponym)
