= Podvelka =

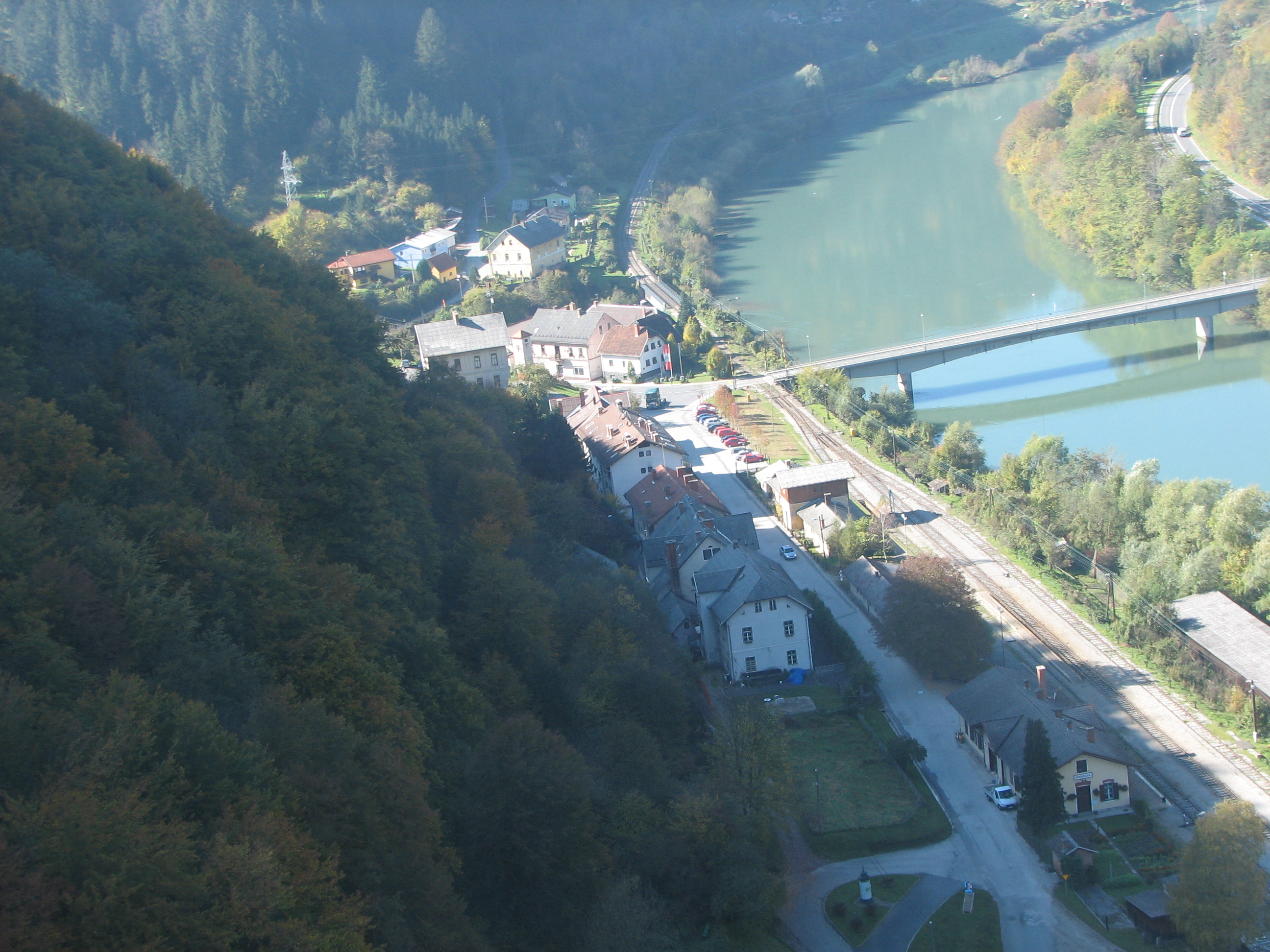

- Location in Slovenia
- Coordinates: 46°35′11″N 15°19′43″E
- Country: Slovenia
- Traditional region: Styria
- Statistical region: Carinthia
- Municipality: Podvelka

Area
  - Total: 3.66 km^{2} (1.41 sq mi)
- Elevation: 350.6 m (1,150 ft)

Population (2019)
  - Total: 299

Podvelka (pronounced [pɔˈdʋeːlka]; formerly Ribnica, German: Reifnig) is a village in northeastern Slovenia. It is the seat of the Municipality of Podvelka. It lies in the traditional region of Styria, but belongs to the Carinthia Statistical Region. The settlement is situated on the right bank of the Drava River on the railway line from Maribor to Dravograd.

== Name ==
The name Podvelka was created in the 20th century to designate the train station previously known as Ribnica(-Brezno) (German: Reifnig). The name is a fused prepositional phrase: pod 'below' + Velka. The latter element refers to Velka Creek, which flows from the Pohorje Mountains and empties into the Drava River west of the settlement. The name of the stream is derived from the ellipsis velika (voda) 'large creek'.
