= Zgornja Orlica =

- Location in Slovenia
- Coordinates: 46°32′59.23″N 15°15′44.6″E
- Country: Slovenia
- Traditional region: Styria
- Statistical region: Carinthia
- Municipality: Ribnica na Pohorju

Area
  - Total: 6.11 km^{2} (2.36 sq mi)
- Elevation: 662.9 m (2,175 ft)

Population (2002)
  - Total: 97

Zgornja Orlica (pronounced [ˈzɡoːɾnja ˈoːɾlitsa]) is a dispersed settlement in the Municipality of Ribnica na Pohorju in northeastern Slovenia. It lies in the Pohorje Hills, just north of Ribnica. The area is part of the traditional Styria region. The entire municipality is now included in the Carinthia Statistical Region.

== History ==
Zgornja Orlica was established as a separate settlement in 1994, when the former village of Orlica was split into Zgornja Orlica and Spodnja Orlica (in the neighboring Municipality of Radlje ob Dravi).
