= Sveti Anton na Pohorju =

Sveti Anton na Pohorju Planina (1955–1993)
- Location in Slovenia
- Coordinates: 46°34′30.84″N 15°13′38.7″E
- Country: Slovenia
- Traditional region: Styria
- Statistical region: Carinthia
- Municipality: Radlje ob Dravi

Area
  - Total: 21.48 km^{2} (8.29 sq mi)
- Elevation: 646.2 m (2,120 ft)

Population (2002)
  - Total: 239

Sveti Anton na Pohorju (pronounced [ˈsʋèːti anˈtóːn na ˈpóːxɔɾju]; German: Sankt Anton am Bachern) is a dispersed settlement in the Pohorje Hills in the Municipality of Radlje ob Dravi in Slovenia.

== Name ==
The name of the settlement was changed from Sveti Anton na Pohorju (literally, 'Saint Anthony in the Pohorje Hills') to Planina (literally, 'alpine pasture') in 1955. The name was changed on the basis of the 1948 Law on Names of Settlements and Designations of Squares, Streets, and Buildings as part of efforts by Slovenia's postwar communist government to remove religious elements from toponyms. The name Sveti Anton na Pohorju was restored in 1993. In the past the German name was Sankt Anton am Bachern.

== Church ==
The parish church from which the settlement gets its name is dedicated to Saint Anthony of Padua and belongs to the Roman Catholic Archdiocese of Maribor. It was built in the late 17th century.
