= Rdeči Breg, Podvelka =

Rdeči Breg
- Location in Slovenia
- Coordinates: 46°33′52.46″N 15°21′1.83″E
- Country: Slovenia
- Traditional region: Styria
- Statistical region: Carinthia
- Municipality: Podvelka

Area
  - Total: 9.2 km^{2} (3.6 sq mi)
- Elevation: 842.2 m (2,763 ft)

Population (2002)
  - Total: 99
- The information on this page refers only to the part of Rdeči Breg that belongs to the Municipality of Podvelka

Rdeči Breg (pronounced [əɾˈdeːtʃi ˈbɾeːk]) is a dispersed settlement in the Pohorje Hills south of the Drava River in the Municipality of Podvelka in Slovenia.

The local church is dedicated to Saint Ignatius of Loyola and is the only church in Slovenia dedicated to this saint. It is a Baroque church built in 1759.
