= Spodnja Vižinga =

- Location in Slovenia
- Coordinates: 46°35′59.52″N 15°14′10.56″E
- Country: Slovenia
- Traditional region: Styria
- Statistical region: Carinthia
- Municipality: Radlje ob Dravi

Area
  - Total: 2.35 km^{2} (0.91 sq mi)
- Elevation: 337.5 m (1,107 ft)

Population (2002)
  - Total: 313

Spodnja Vižinga (pronounced [ˈspoːdnja ˈʋiːʒiŋɡa], German: Unterfeising) is a settlement on the left bank of the Drava River in the Municipality of Radlje ob Dravi in Slovenia.
