= Ožbalt =

Ožbalt Sveti Ožbalt (until 1952)
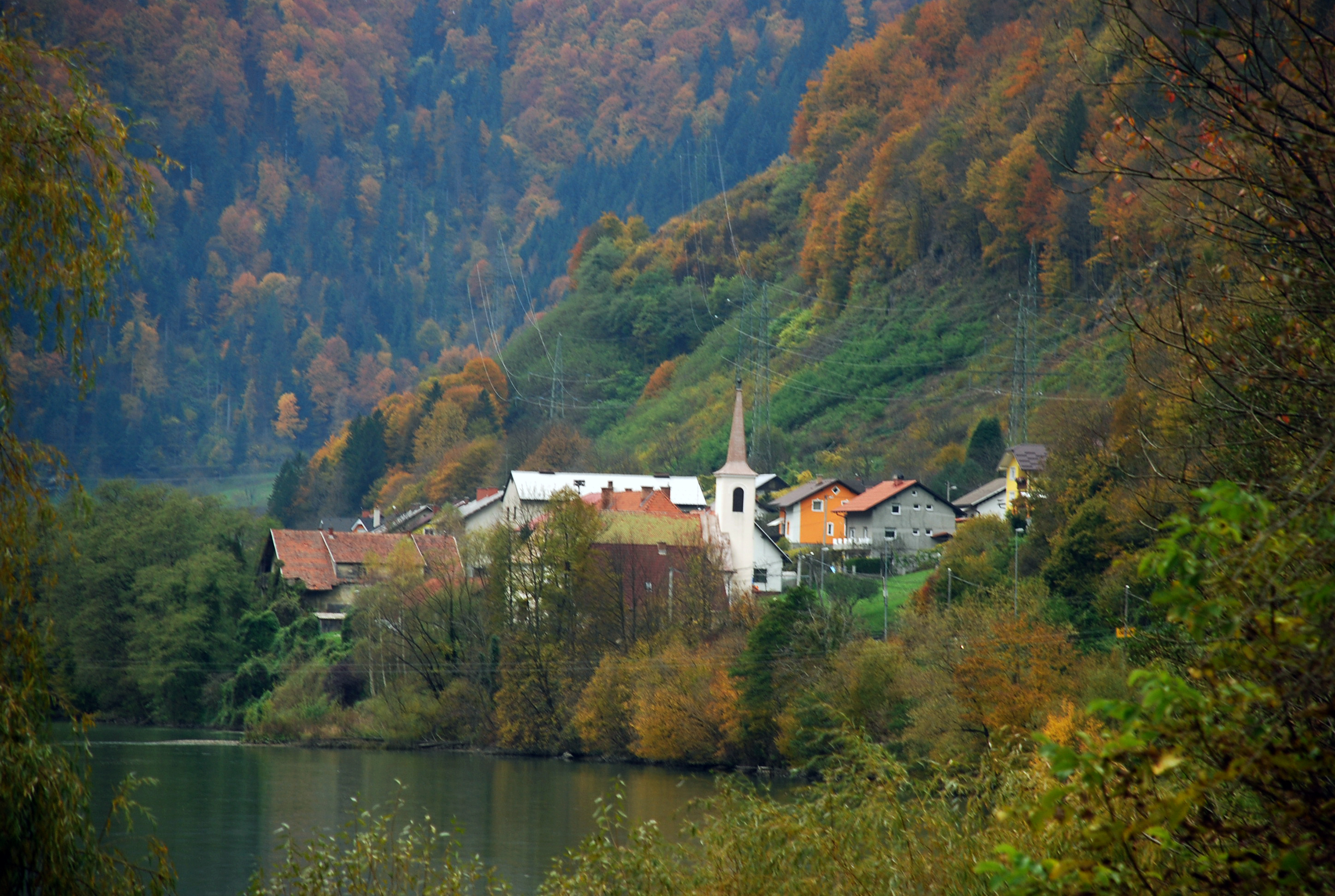
- View of Ožbalt from the east

- Location in Slovenia
- Coordinates: 46°35′51.7″N 15°23′18.63″E
- Country: Slovenia
- Traditional region: Styria
- Statistical region: Carinthia
- Municipality: Podvelka

Area
  - Total: 8.41 km^{2} (3.25 sq mi)
- Elevation: 451.5 m (1,481 ft)

Population (2002)
  - Total: 301

Ožbalt (pronounced [ˈoːʒbalt]) is a village on the left bank of the Drava River in the Municipality of Podvelka in Slovenia.

== Name ==
The name of the settlement was changed from Sveti Ožbalt (literally, 'Saint Oswald') to Ožbalt (literally, 'Oswald') in 1952. The name was changed on the basis of the 1948 Law on Names of Settlements and Designations of Squares, Streets, and Buildings as part of efforts by Slovenia's postwar communist government to remove religious elements from toponyms.

== Church ==
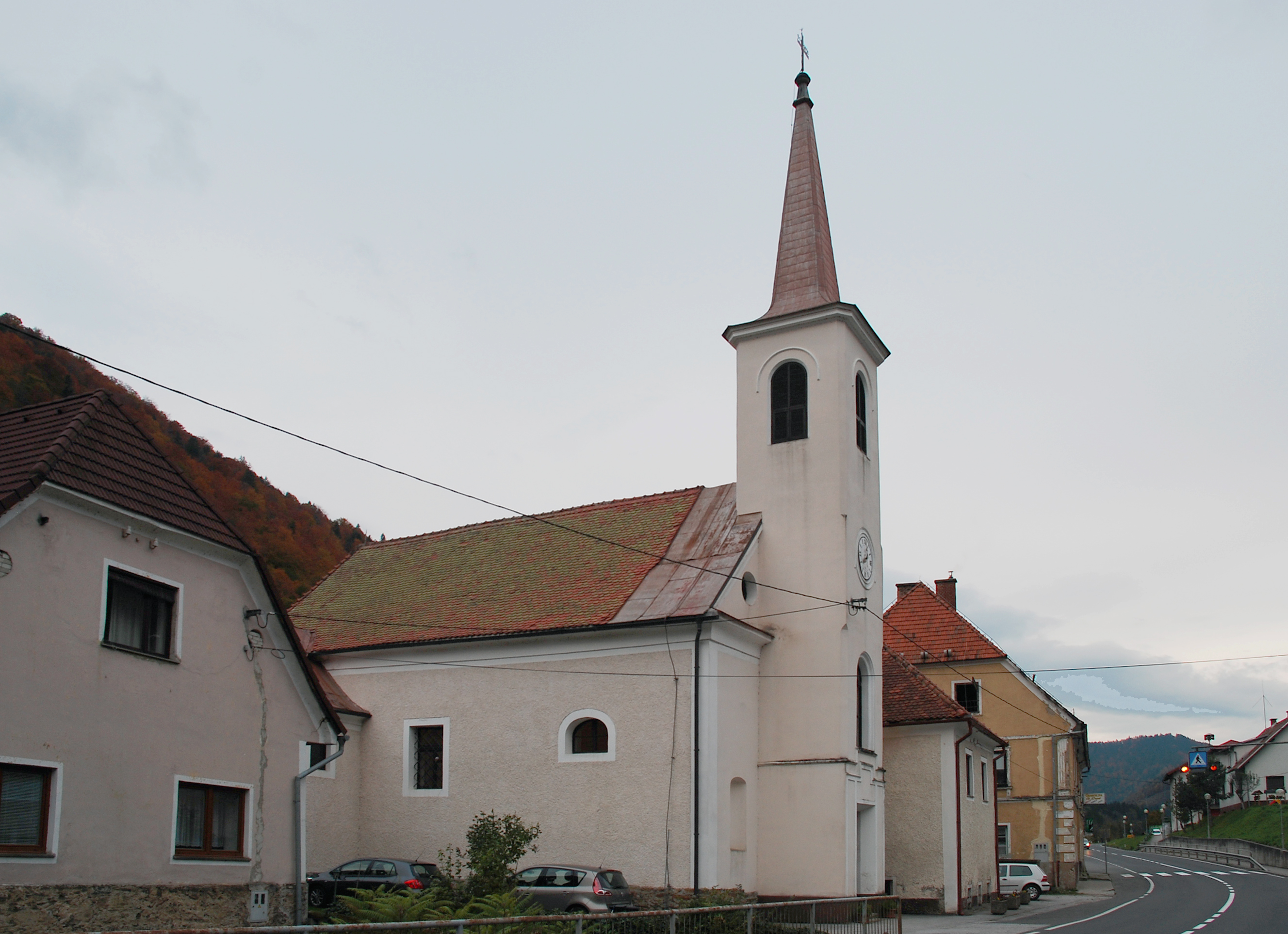
St. Oswald's Church

The local parish church, from which the settlement gets its name, is dedicated to Saint Oswald. It belongs to the Roman Catholic Archdiocese of Maribor and was originally a Gothic building from the late 14th century. It is an old pilgrimage church. The current structure dates to 1813 and the belfry was added in 1859. The internal furnishings are Baroque, whereas the main altar was built in stone before World War II.
