= Brezni Vrh =

- Location in Slovenia
- Coordinates: 46°38′9.36″N 15°18′50.9″E
- Country: Slovenia
- Traditional region: Styria
- Statistical region: Carinthia
- Municipality: Radlje ob Dravi

Area
  - Total: 7.58 km^{2} (2.93 sq mi)
- Elevation: 543.6 m (1,783 ft)

Population (2002)
  - Total: 175

Brezni Vrh (pronounced [ˈbɾeːzni ˈʋəɾx]) is a dispersed settlement in the hills north of the Drava River in the Municipality of Radlje ob Dravi in Slovenia, on the border with Austria.
