= Zgornja Vižinga =

- Location in Slovenia
- Coordinates: 46°36′54.53″N 15°11′46.97″E
- Country: Slovenia
- Traditional region: Styria
- Statistical region: Carinthia
- Municipality: Radlje ob Dravi

Area
  - Total: 1.85 km^{2} (0.71 sq mi)
- Elevation: 334.9 m (1,099 ft)

Population (2002)
  - Total: 254

Zgornja Vižinga (pronounced [ˈzɡoːɾnja ˈʋiːʒiŋɡa], German: Oberfeising) is a village on the left bank of the Drava River in the Municipality of Radlje ob Dravi in Slovenia.

The local church is dedicated to Saint Giles (Slovene: sveti Ilj) and was first mentioned in written documents dating to the 13th century. The current building was built around 1700 and renovated in 1834. It belongs to the Parish of Radlje.
