= Brezno, Podvelka =

Brezno Fresen
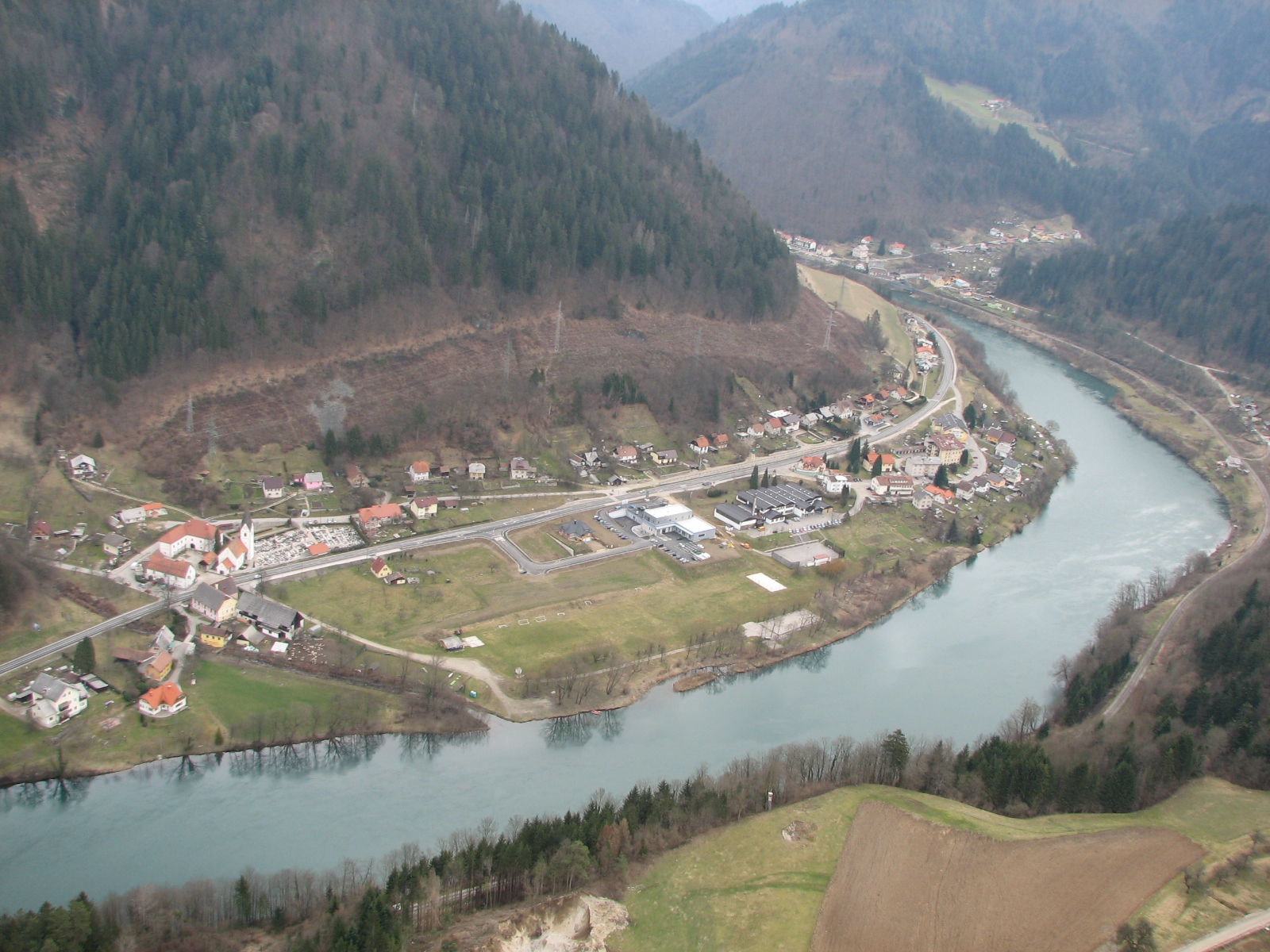

- Location in Slovenia
- Coordinates: 46°35′27.35″N 15°19′14.86″E
- Country: Slovenia
- Traditional region: Styria
- Statistical region: Carinthia
- Municipality: Podvelka

Area
  - Total: 5.01 km^{2} (1.93 sq mi)
- Elevation: 317.4 m (1,041 ft)

Population (2002)
  - Total: 472

Brezno (pronounced [ˈbɾeːznɔ]) is a settlement on the left bank of the Drava River in the Municipality of Podvelka in Slovenia.

The local parish church is dedicated to the Assumption of Mary and belongs to the Roman Catholic Archdiocese of Maribor. It was first mentioned in written documents dating to 1161 and 1184 and is Romanesque and early Gothic in its origins. The belfry was added in 1671. The internal furnishings are Baroque.
