= Javnik =

- Location in Slovenia
- Coordinates: 46°35′46.71″N 15°21′29.35″E
- Country: Slovenia
- Traditional region: Styria
- Statistical region: Carinthia
- Municipality: Podvelka

Area
  - Total: 9.01 km^{2} (3.48 sq mi)
- Elevation: 591.3 m (1,940 ft)

Population (2002)
  - Total: 181

Javnik (pronounced [ˈjaːu̯nik]) is a settlement in the hills above the left bank of the Drava River in the Municipality of Podvelka in Slovenia.
