= Lehen na Pohorju =

- Location in Slovenia
- Coordinates: 46°32′40.47″N 15°19′42.5″E
- Country: Slovenia
- Traditional region: Styria
- Statistical region: Carinthia
- Municipality: Podvelka

Area
  - Total: 8.49 km^{2} (3.28 sq mi)
- Elevation: 486.7 m (1,597 ft)

Population (2002)
  - Total: 183

Lehen na Pohorju (pronounced [ˈlèːxən na ˈpóːxɔɾju]) is a dispersed settlement in the Pohorje Hills in the Municipality of Podvelka in Slovenia.

== Mass grave ==
Lehen na Pohorju is the site of a mass grave from the Second World War. The Lehen Mass Grave (Slovene: Grobišče Lehen) is located above the Urbanc farm, at Lehen na Pohorju no. 17. It contains the remains of eight Slovene civilians. They had sought to join a local Partisan unit, but were accused of being spies. The Partisans tortured and then murdered the victims on 4 January 1944, and burned their bodies. The local people collected the remains and buried them in the forest above the house.
