= Municipality of Radlje ob Dravi =

Municipality of Slovenia

Municipality of Radlje ob Dravi Občina Radlje ob Dravi
- Municipality
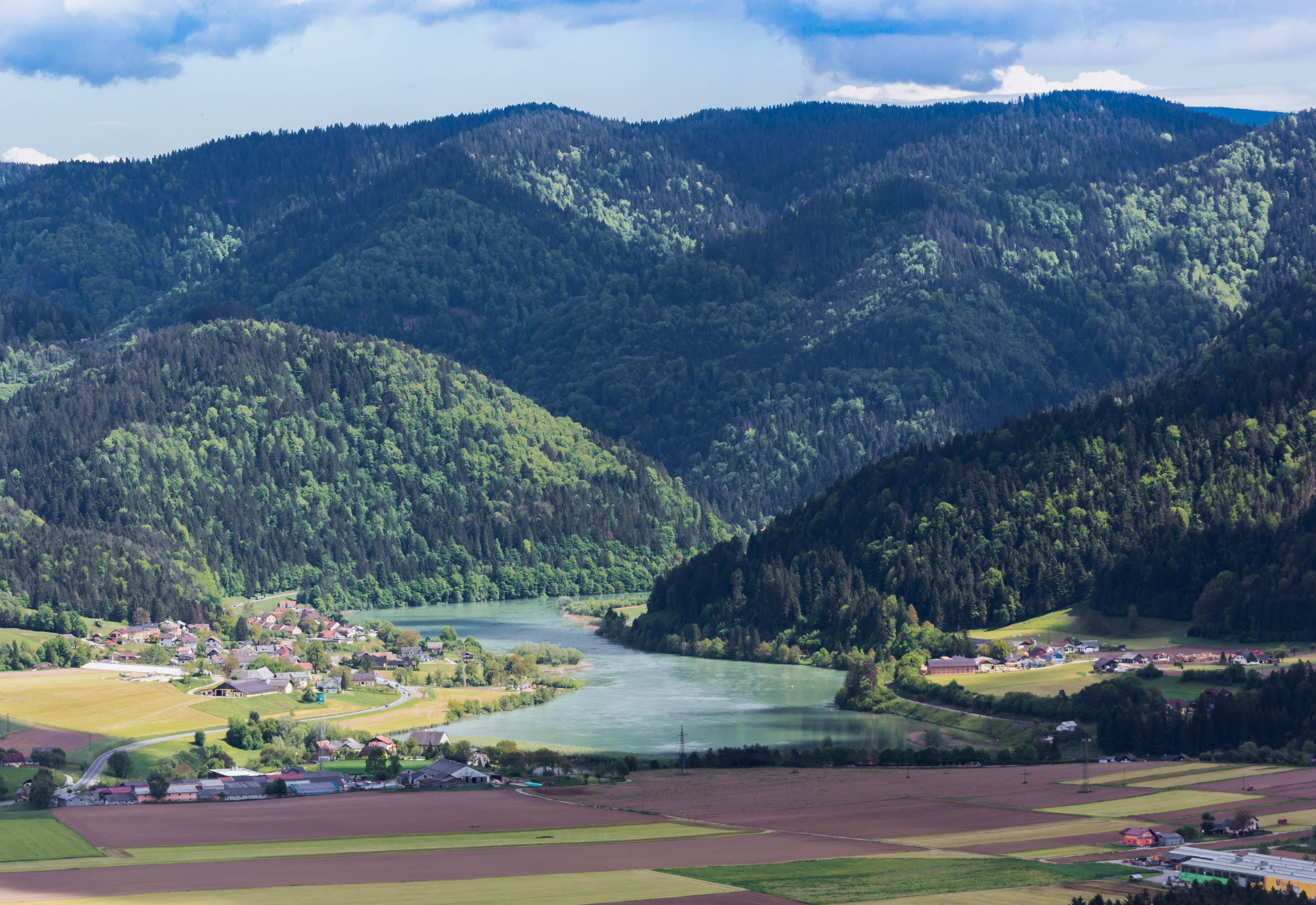

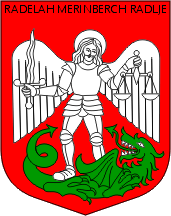
- Coat of arms

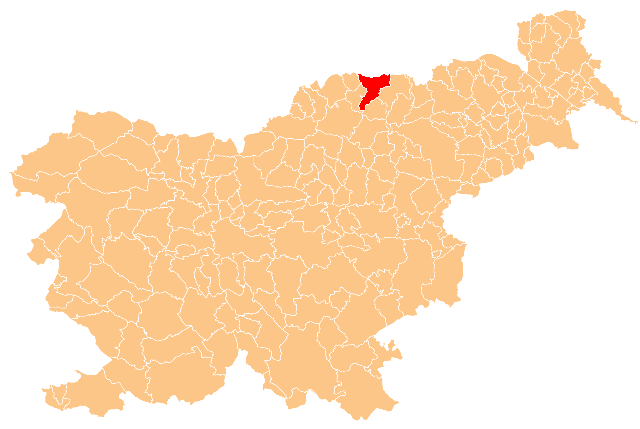
- Location of the Municipality of Radlje ob Dravi in Slovenia
- Coordinates: 46°37′N 15°14′E
- Country: Slovenia

Government
  - Mayor: Alan Bukovnik

Area
  - Total: 93.9 km^{2} (36.3 sq mi)

Population (2002)
  - Total: 6,148
  - Density: 65.5/km^{2} (170/sq mi)
- Time zone: UTC+01 (CET)
  - Summer (DST): UTC+02 (CEST)
- Website: www.obcina-radlje.si

The Municipality of Radlje ob Dravi (pronounced [ˈɾaːdljɛ ɔb ˈdɾaːʋi]; Slovene: Občina Radlje ob Dravi) is a municipality in Slovenia. It lies in the traditional region of Styria, but belongs to the Carinthia Statistical Region. The seat of the municipality is the town of Radlje ob Dravi. It borders Austria.

== Settlements ==
In addition to the municipal seat of Radlje ob Dravi, the municipality also includes the following settlements:

- Brezni Vrh
- Dobrava
- Radelca
- Remšnik
- Šent Janž pri Radljah
- Spodnja Orlica
- Spodnja Vižinga
- Sveti Anton na Pohorju
- Sveti Trije Kralji
- Vas
- Vuhred
- Zgornja Vižinga
- Zgornji Kozji Vrh
