= Janževski Vrh =

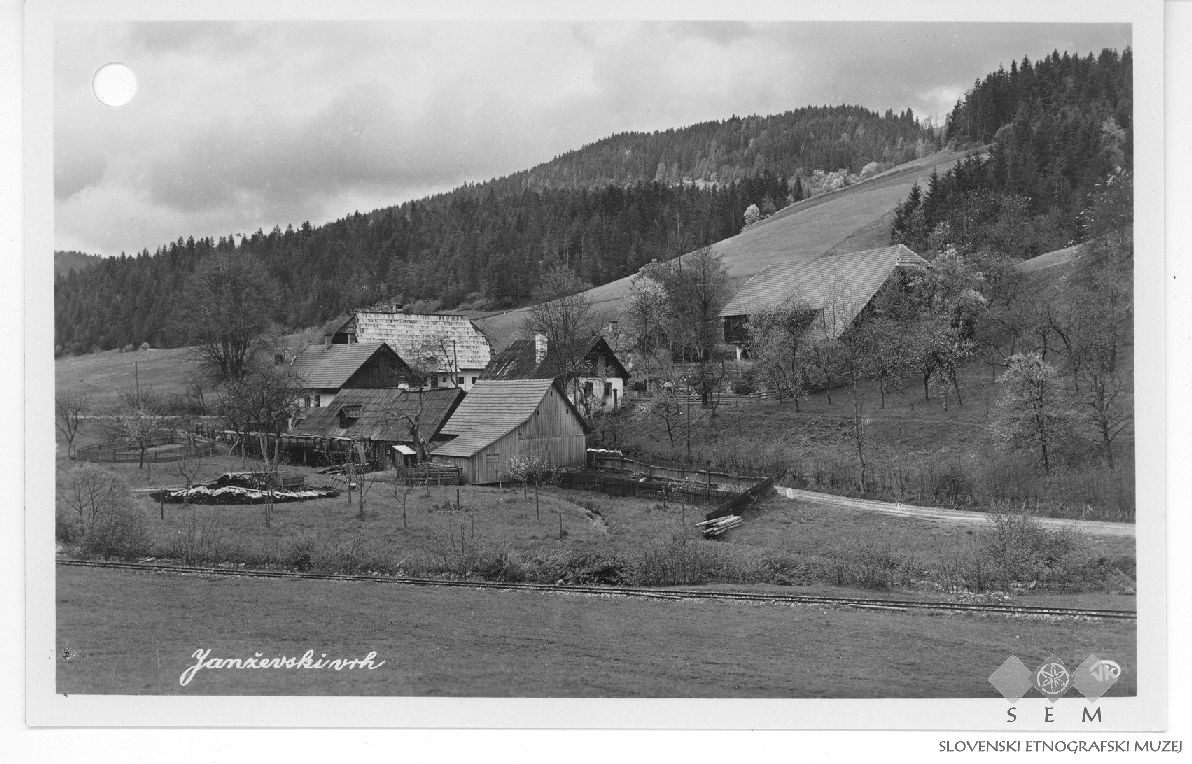
- Postcard of Janževski Vrh

- Location in Slovenia
- Coordinates: 46°33′43.84″N 15°18′28.23″E
- Country: Slovenia
- Traditional region: Styria
- Statistical region: Carinthia
- Municipality: Podvelka

Area
  - Total: 14.78 km^{2} (5.71 sq mi)
- Elevation: 704.3 m (2,311 ft)

Population (2002)
  - Total: 290

Janževski Vrh (pronounced [ˈjaːnʒɛu̯ski ˈʋəɾx]) is a settlement in the hills above the right bank of the Drava River in the Municipality of Podvelka in Slovenia.

It gets its name from the local church, dedicated to John the Baptist (Janž in the local dialect). It belongs to the Parish of Ribnica na Pohorju and is a Late Gothic building from the first half of the 16th century. The internal furnishings date to the 17th century.
