= Kozji Vrh, Podvelka =

Kozji Vrh
- Location in Slovenia
- Coordinates: 46°35′54.48″N 15°17′43.86″E
- Country: Slovenia
- Traditional region: Styria
- Statistical region: Carinthia
- Municipality: Podvelka

Area
  - Total: 2.64 km^{2} (1.02 sq mi)
- Elevation: 456 m (1,496 ft)

Population (2002)
  - Total: 52

Kozji Vrh (pronounced [ˈkoːzji ˈʋəɾx]) is a settlement in the hills above the left bank of the Drava River in the Municipality of Podvelka in Slovenia.
