= Remšnik =

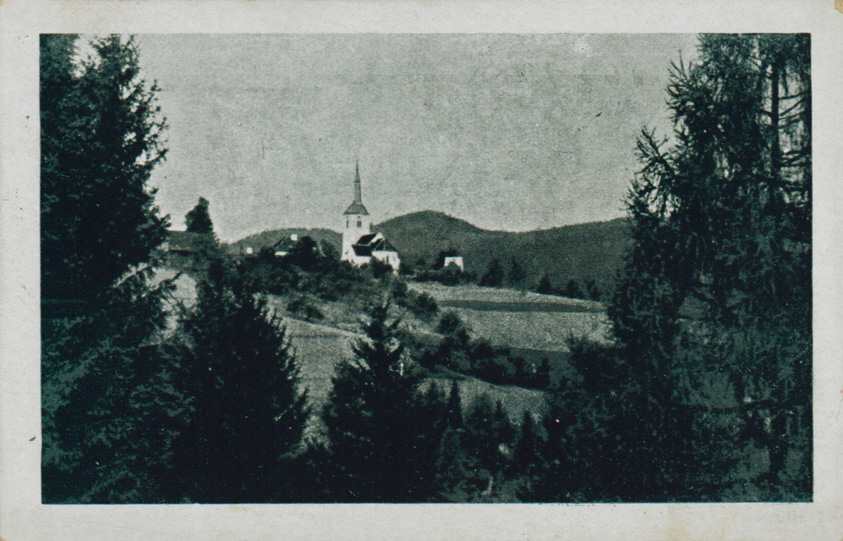
- 1920s postcard of Remšnik

- Location in Slovenia
- Coordinates: 46°38′32.95″N 15°17′10.4″E
- Country: Slovenia
- Traditional region: Styria
- Statistical region: Carinthia
- Municipality: Radlje ob Dravi

Area
  - Total: 5.93 km^{2} (2.29 sq mi)
- Elevation: 851.2 m (2,793 ft)

Population (2002)
  - Total: 99

Remšnik (pronounced [ˈɾeːmʃnik]) is a dispersed settlement in the hills northeast of Radlje ob Dravi in Slovenia.

The parish church in the settlement is dedicated to Saint George and belongs to the Roman Catholic Archdiocese of Maribor. It was built on the foundations of a late Gothic church dating to 1532 after a fire in 1863 completely destroyed the original building. It is a single-nave church with a belfry on its western facade.
