= Vuhred =

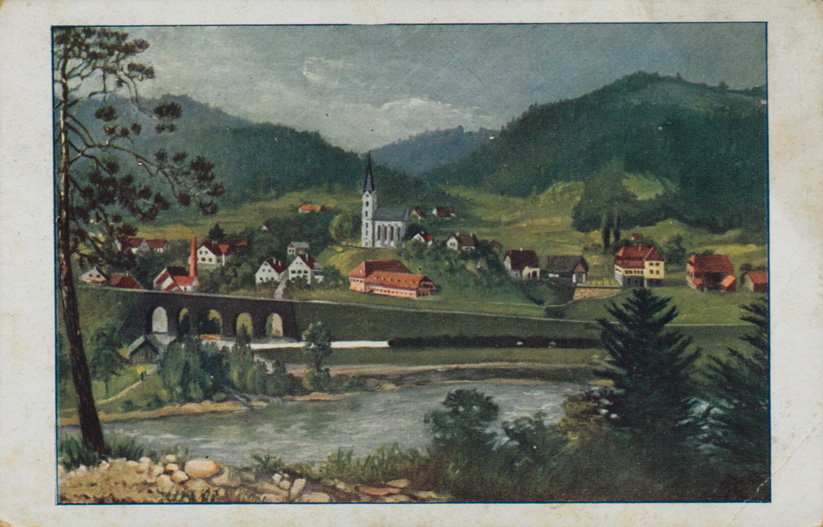
- 1920s postcard of Vuhred

- Location in Slovenia
- Coordinates: 46°35′32.98″N 15°13′58.23″E
- Country: Slovenia
- Traditional region: Styria
- Statistical region: Carinthia
- Municipality: Radlje ob Dravi

Area
  - Total: 5.14 km^{2} (1.98 sq mi)
- Elevation: 371.2 m (1,218 ft)

Population (2002)
  - Total: 818

Vuhred (pronounced [ˈʋuːxɾɛt]; German: Wuchern) is a village on the right bank of the Drava River in the Municipality of Radlje ob Dravi in Slovenia.

The parish church in the settlement is dedicated to Saint Lawrence and belongs to the Roman Catholic Archdiocese of Maribor. It was built in 1884 on the foundations of a 17th-century church.
