= Municipality of Ribnica na Pohorju =

Municipality of Slovenia

Municipality of Ribnica na Pohorju Občina Ribnica na Pohorju
- Municipality
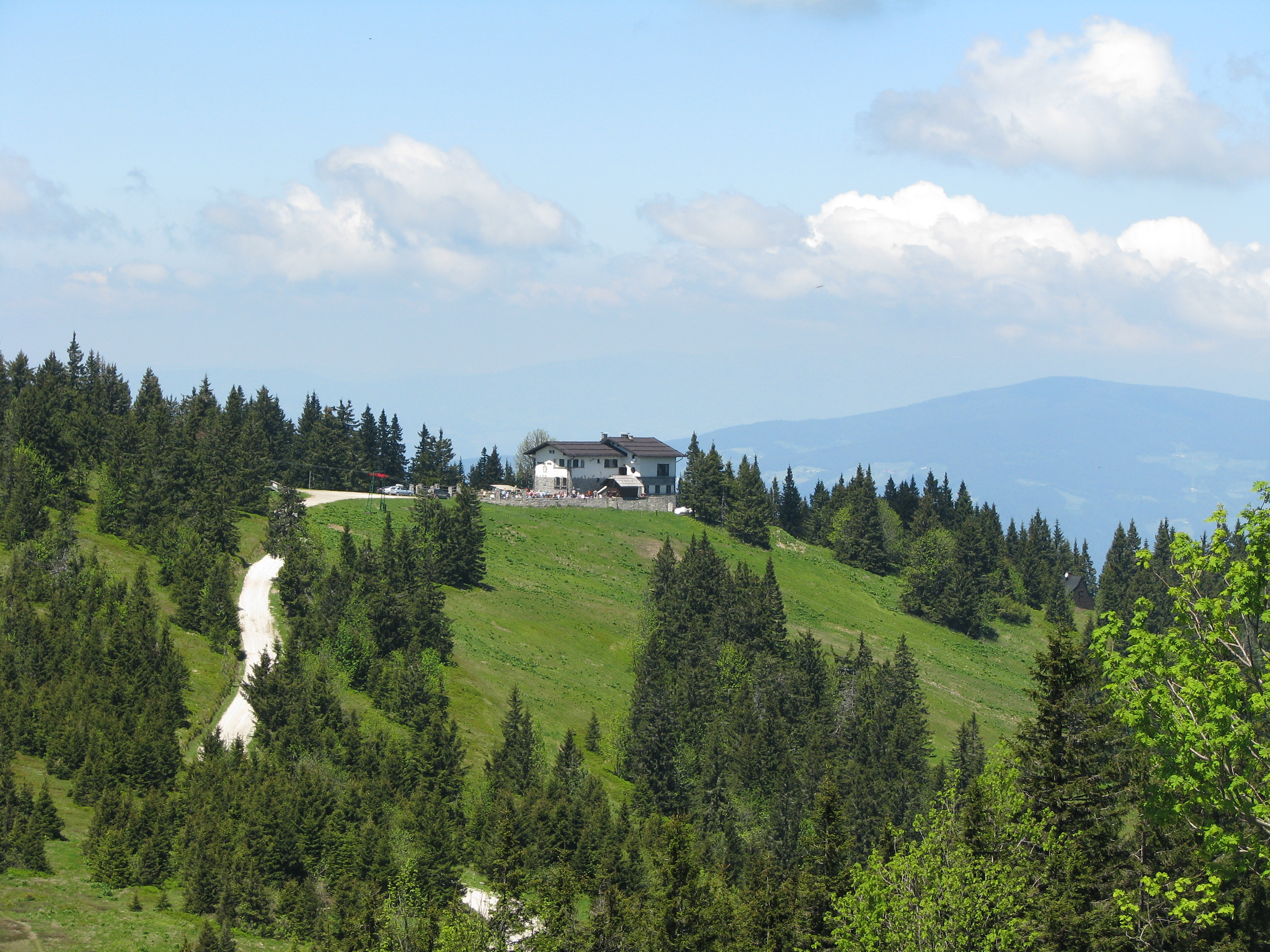
- Pohorje Hills near Ribnica

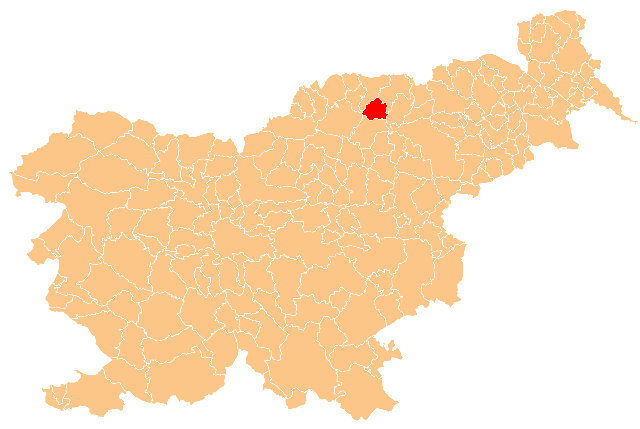
- Location of the Municipality of Rečica ob Savinji in Slovenia
- Coordinates: 46°31′N 15°16′E
- Country: Slovenia

Government
  - Mayor: Srečko Geč

Area
  - Total: 59.3 km^{2} (22.9 sq mi)

Population (July 1, 2018)
  - Total: 1,138
  - Density: 19.2/km^{2} (49.7/sq mi)
- Time zone: UTC+01 (CET)
  - Summer (DST): UTC+02 (CEST)
- Website: www.ribnicanapohorju.si

The Municipality of Ribnica na Pohorju (Slovene: Občina Ribnica na Pohorju) is a municipality in the traditional region of Styria in northeastern Slovenia. It is also part of the larger Carinthia Statistical Region. The seat of the municipality is the town of Ribnica na Pohorju. Ribnica na Pohorju became a municipality in 1998.

== Settlements ==
In addition to the municipal seat of Ribnica na Pohorju, the municipality also includes the following settlements:

- Hudi Kot
- Josipdol
- Zgornja Orlica
- Zgornji Janževski Vrh
- Zgornji Lehen na Pohorju

== Demographics ==
[From 2002 census]

1,254 people counted. Of these, 1,168 of them had an ethnicity listed. 1,165 Slovenes. 3 others.
