= Kapljišče =

- Location in Slovenia
- Coordinates: 45°36′17.76″N 15°16′6.34″E
- Country: Slovenia
- Traditional region: White Carniola
- Statistical region: Southeast Slovenija
- Municipality: Metlika

Area
  - Total: 0.45 km^{2} (0.17 sq mi)
- Elevation: 143.4 m (470 ft)

Population (2002)
  - Total: 28
- Postal code: 8332

Kapljišče (Slovene pronunciation: [ˈkaːpljiʃtʃɛ]) is a small settlement in the Municipality of Metlika in the White Carniola area of southeastern Slovenia, close to the border with Croatia on the left bank of the Kolpa River. The area is part of the traditional region of Lower Carniola and is now included in the Southeast Slovenia Statistical Region.
