= Kaplja Vas, Sevnica =

Kaplja Vas
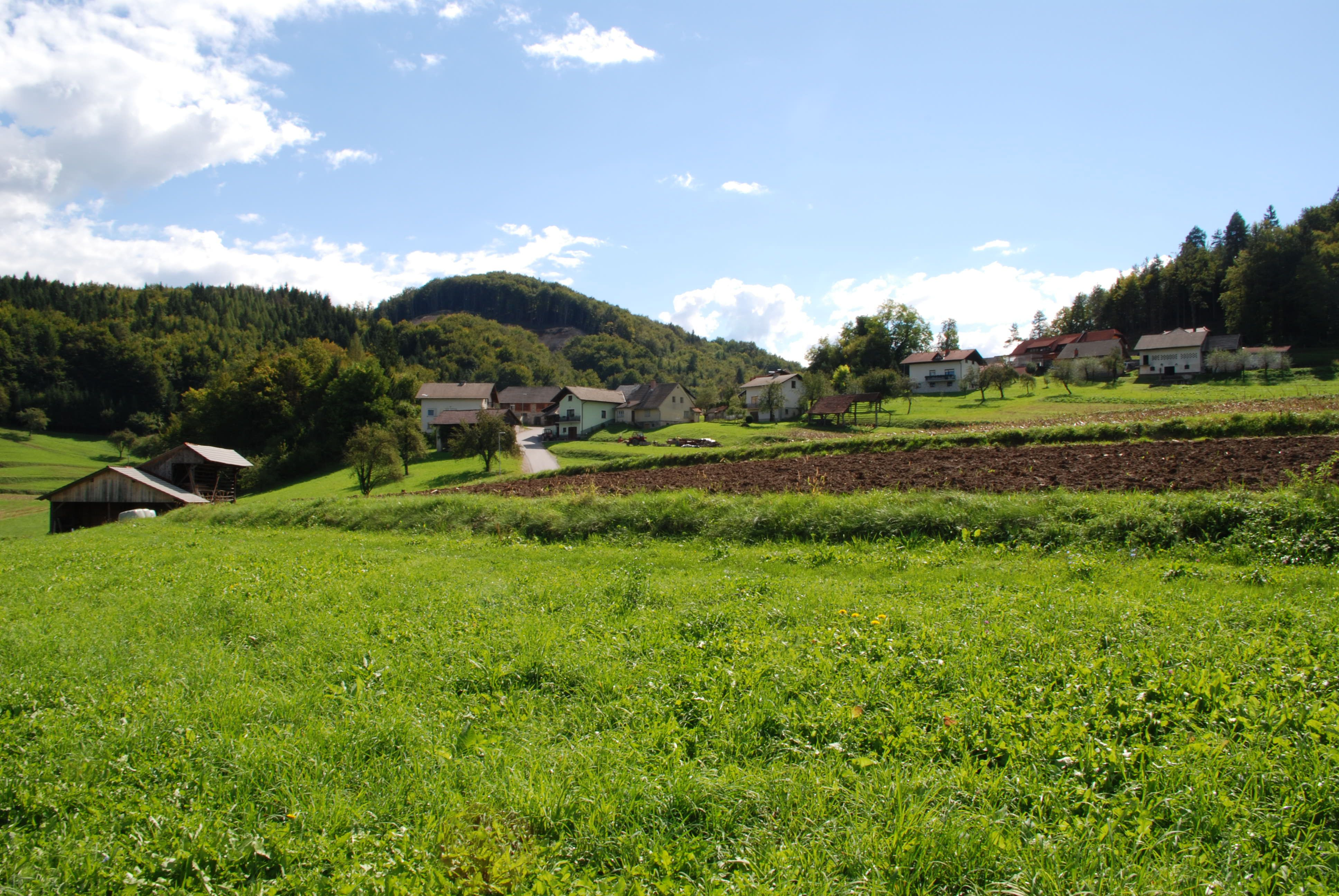

- Location in Slovenia
- Coordinates: 45°57′39.21″N 15°10′44.65″E
- Country: Slovenia
- Traditional region: Lower Carniola
- Statistical region: Lower Sava
- Municipality: Sevnica

Area
  - Total: 1.64 km^{2} (0.63 sq mi)
- Elevation: 256.9 m (843 ft)

Population (2002)
  - Total: 63

Kaplja Vas (pronounced [ˈkaːplja ˈʋaːs]; Slovene: Kaplja vas) is a village in the Municipality of Sevnica in central Slovenia. The area is part of the historical region of Lower Carniola. The municipality is now included in the Lower Sava Statistical Region.

The local church is dedicated to Saint George (Slovene: sveti Jurij) and belongs to the Parish of Tržišče. It is a medieval building with a Romanesque nave, a Gothic presbyterium, and the church tower from the 17th century. It stands in the hamlet of Sveti Jurij on St. George's Hill (Slovene: Šentjurski hrib).

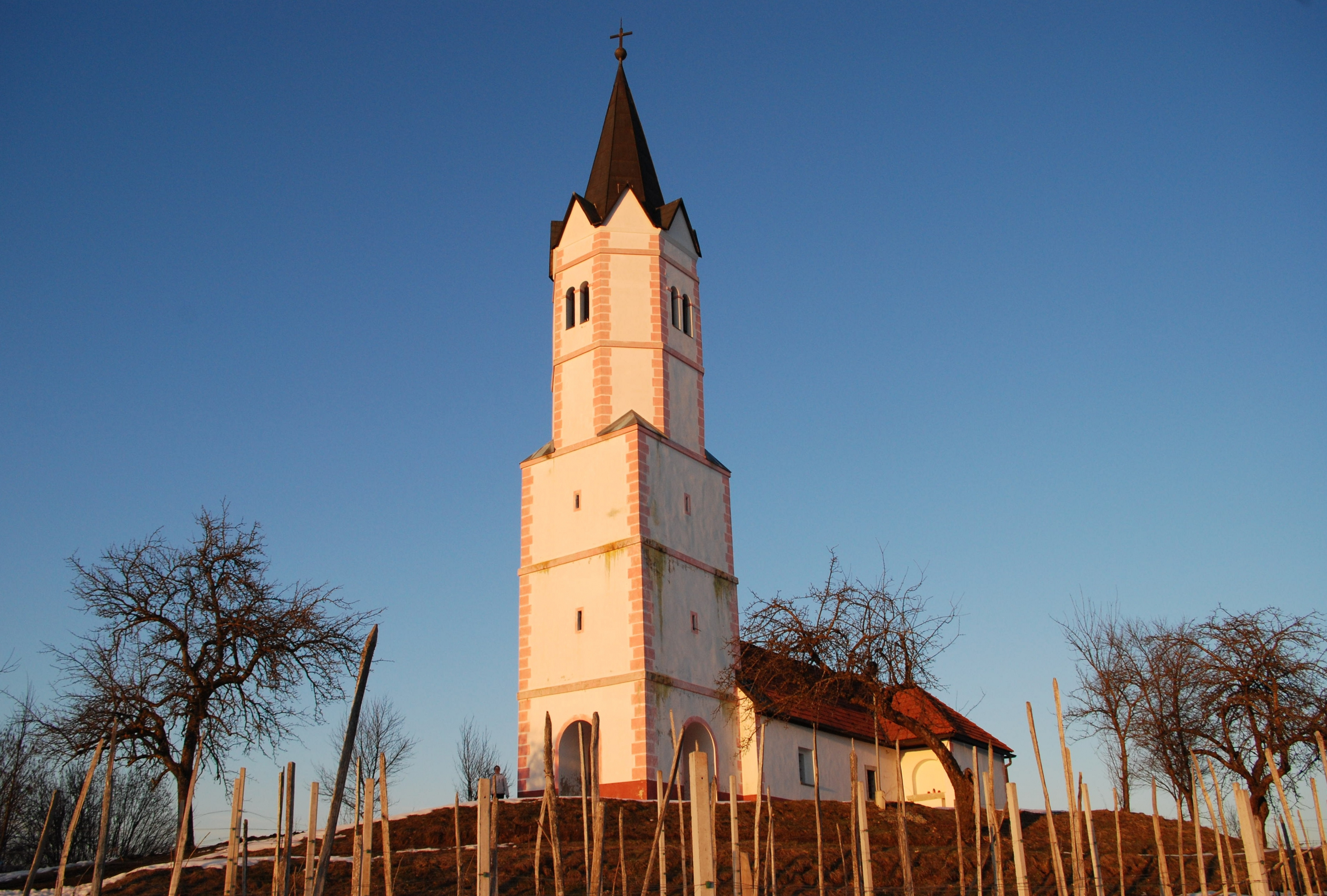
St. George's Church
