= Radlje ob Dravi =

Radlje ob Dravi Marenberg (until 1952)
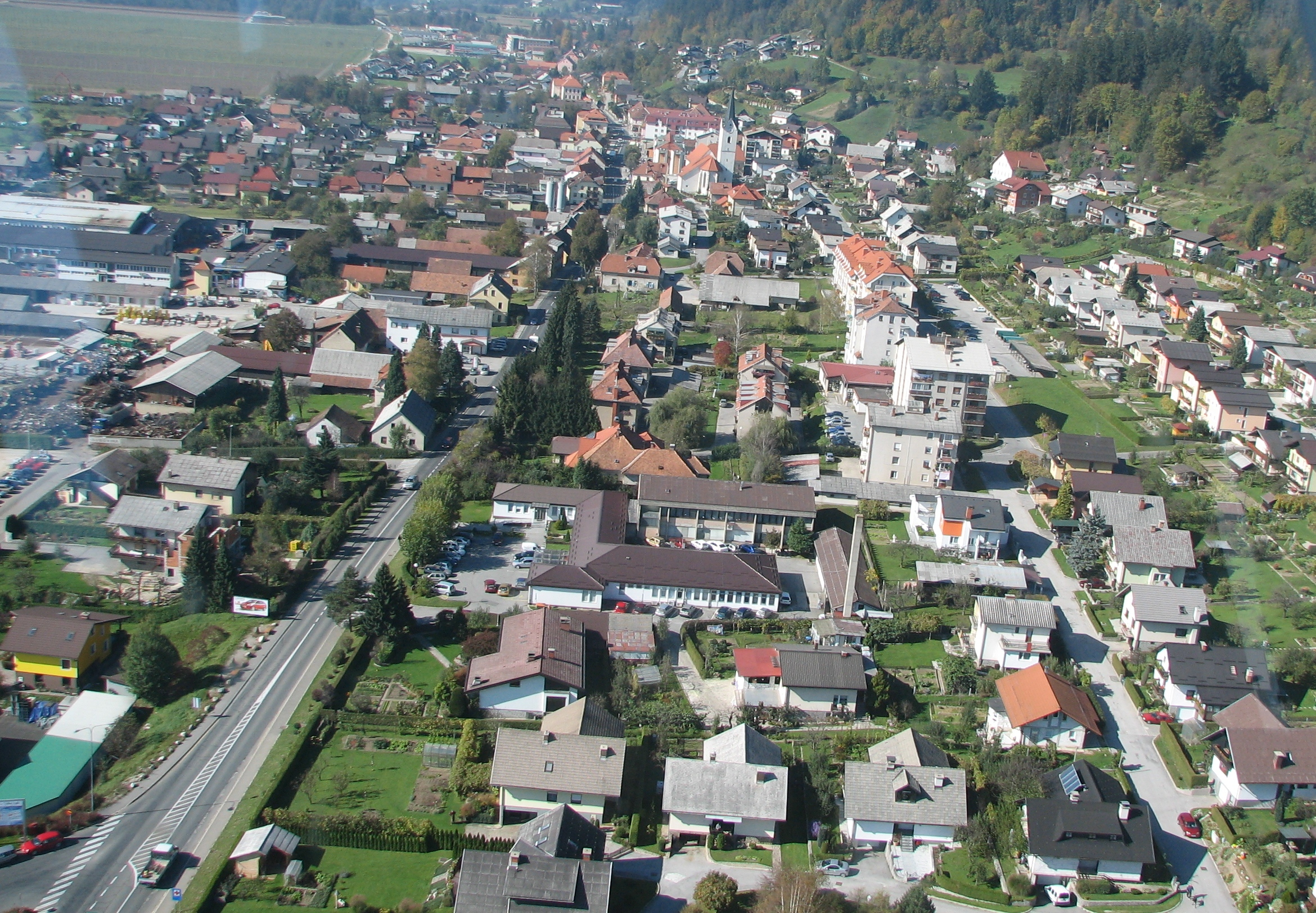
- Radlje ob Dravi

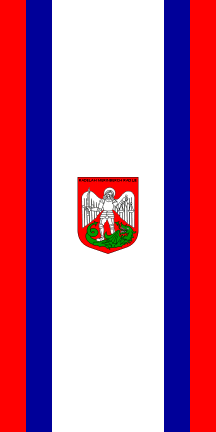
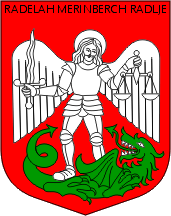
- Flag Coat of arms

- Location in Slovenia
- Coordinates: 46°36′54.65″N 15°13′35.08″E
- Country: Slovenia
- Traditional region: Styria
- Statistical region: Carinthia
- Municipality: Radlje ob Dravi
- Elevation: 371 m (1,217 ft)

Population (2002)
  - Total: 4,462
- Postal code: 2360
- Vehicle registration: SG

Radlje ob Dravi (pronounced [ˈɾaːdljɛ ɔb ˈdɾaːʋi], in older sources Marbeg, German: Mahrenberg) is a town in the Municipality of Radlje ob Dravi in northeastern Slovenia. It is the seat of the municipality. The settlement lies on a terrace on the left bank of the Drava River.

== Name ==
The name of the settlement was changed from Marenberg to Radlje ob Dravi in 1952. The name was changed on the basis of the 1948 Law on Names of Settlements and Designations of Squares, Streets, and Buildings as part of efforts by Slovenia's postwar communist government to remove German elements from toponyms.

== Cultural heritage ==
The parish church in the settlement is dedicated to Saint Michael and belongs to the Roman Catholic Archdiocese of Maribor. It is a Gothic church from the 15th century that was restyled in the early 18th century in the Baroque style.

A large Baroque building on the western edge of the settlement used to be a Dominican convent. It was founded in 1251 and was an important landowner in the region. After the expropriation of the monasteries by Emperor Joseph II, the monastic church dedicated to the Annunciation of Mary was demolished.

== Notable people ==
Notable people that were born or lived in Radlje ob Dravi include:

- Robert Koren (born 1980), football player
