= Municipality of Podvelka =

Municipality of Slovenia

Municipality of Podvelka Občina Podvelka
- Municipality
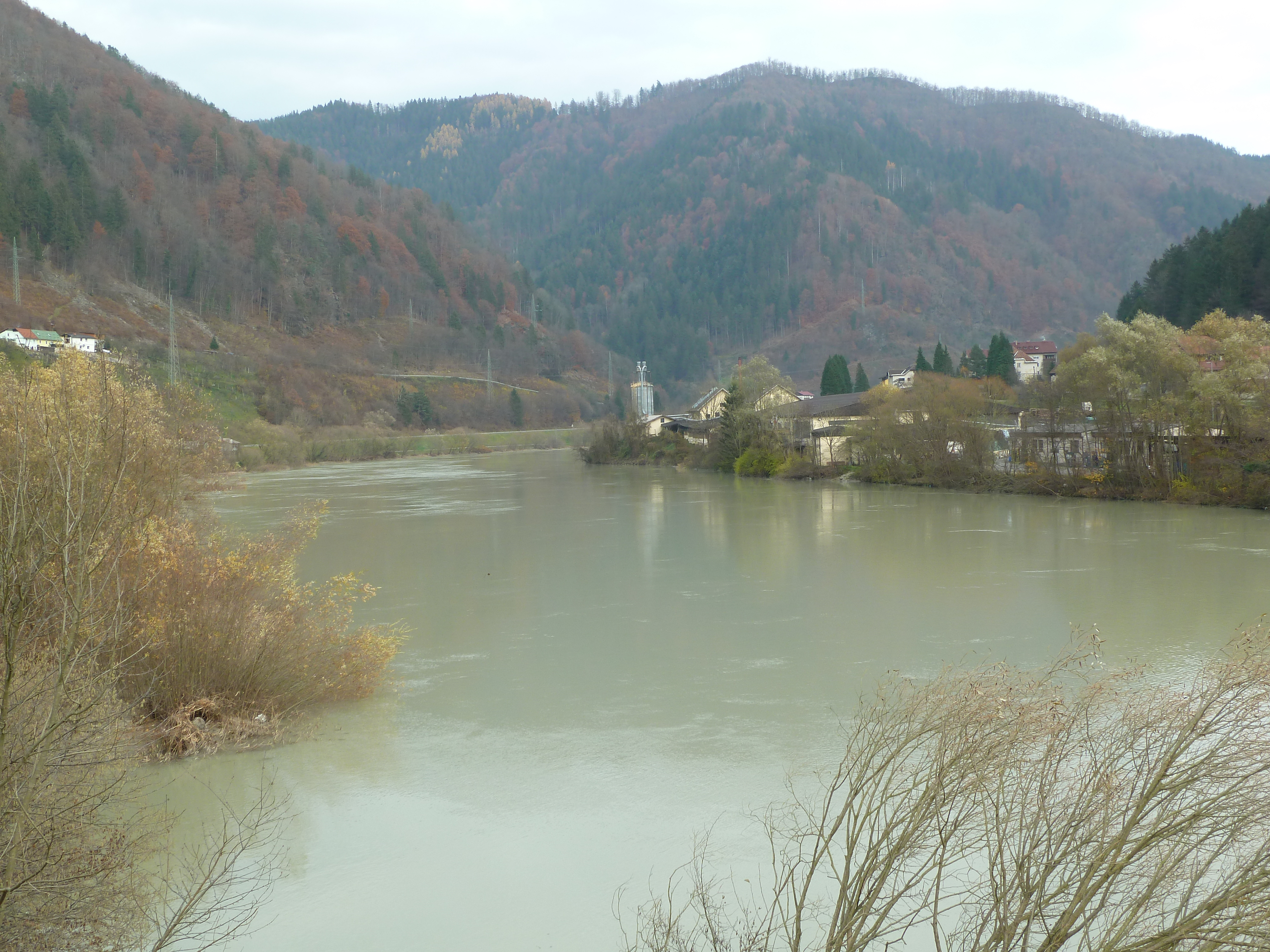

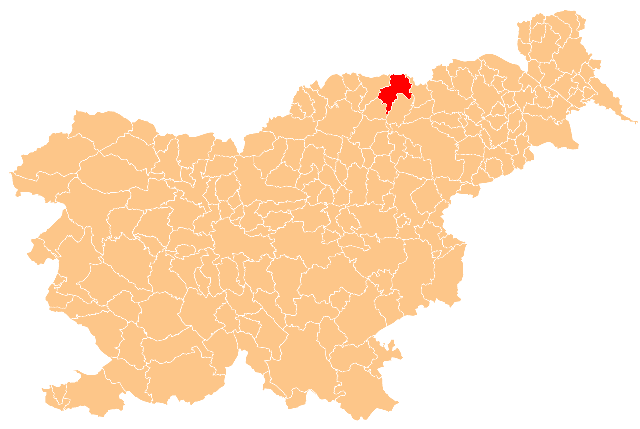
- Location of the Municipality of Podvelka in Slovenia
- Coordinates: 46°36′N 15°21′E
- Country: Slovenia

Government
  - Mayor: Miran Pušnik (Independent)

Area
  - Total: 103.9 km^{2} (40.1 sq mi)

Population (July 1, 2018)
  - Total: 2,354
  - Density: 22.66/km^{2} (58.68/sq mi)
- Time zone: UTC+01 (CET)
  - Summer (DST): UTC+02 (CEST)
- Website: www.podvelka.si

The Municipality of Podvelka (pronounced [pɔˈdʋeːlka]; Slovene: Občina Podvelka) is a municipality in the traditional region of Styria in northern Slovenia. The seat of the municipality is the town of Podvelka. The Municipality of Podvelka–Ribnica was created in 1994, and it then split into the Municipality of Ribnica na Pohorju and the Municipality of Podvelka in 1998. It borders Austria.

== Settlements ==
In addition to the municipal seat of Podvelka, the municipality also includes the following settlements:

- Brezno
- Janževski Vrh
- Javnik
- Kozji Vrh
- Lehen na Pohorju
- Ožbalt
- Rdeči Breg
- Spodnja Kapla
- Vurmat
- Zgornja Kapla
