= Dedni Vrh pri Vojniku =

- Location in Slovenia
- Coordinates: 46°18′49.82″N 15°19′20.30″E
- Country: Slovenia
- Traditional region: Styria
- Statistical region: Savinja
- Municipality: Vojnik

Area
  - Total: 0.4 km^{2} (0.15 sq mi)
- Elevation: 395 m (1,296 ft)

Population (2015)
  - Total: 13

Dedni Vrh pri Vojniku (pronounced [ˈdeːdni ˈʋəɾx pɾi ˈʋoːi̯niku]) is a settlement in the Municipality of Vojnik in eastern Slovenia. It lies just south of Frankolovo off the main road from Vojnik towards Slovenske Konjice. The area is part of the traditional region of Styria. It is now included with the rest of the municipality in the Savinja Statistical Region.

== History ==
Dedni Vrh pri Vojniku became an independent settlement in 2000, when its territory was ceded by Ilovca, Frankolovo, and Rove.
