= Lipa pri Frankolovem =

- Location in Slovenia
- Coordinates: 46°20′56.47″N 15°18′51.48″E
- Country: Slovenia
- Traditional region: Styria
- Statistical region: Savinja
- Municipality: Vojnik

Area
  - Total: 2.69 km^{2} (1.04 sq mi)
- Elevation: 535.7 m (1,758 ft)

Population (2002)
  - Total: 157

Lipa pri Frankolovem (pronounced [ˈliːpa pɾi fɾaŋkɔˈloːʋɛm]) is a settlement in the Municipality of Vojnik in eastern Slovenia. It lies in the hills north of Frankolovo off the main road from Vojnik to Slovenske Konjice. The area is part of the traditional region of Styria and is now included in the Savinja Statistical Region.

== Name ==
The name of the settlement was changed from Lipa to Lipa pri Frankolovem in 1953.
