= List of cities, towns, and villages in Slovenia: Č =

This is a list of cities, towns, and villages in Slovenia, starting with Č.

Settlement	Municipality
Čabrače	Gorenja vas-Poljane
Čača vas	Rogaška Slatina
Čadovlje pri Tržiču	Tržič
Čadovlje	Kranj
Čadram	Oplotnica
Čadramska vas	Slovenska Bistrica
Čadraže	Šentjernej
Čadrg	Tolmin
Čagona	Cerkvenjak
Čagošče	Ivančna Gorica
Čakova	Sveti Jurij ob Ščavnici
Čanje	Sevnica
Čateška Gora	Litija
Čatež ob Savi	Brežice
Čatež	Trebnje
Čebine	Trbovlje
Čeče - del	Hrastnik
Čeče - del	Trbovlje
Čedem	Brežice
Čehovini	Komen
Čekovnik	Idrija
Čelevec	Novo mesto
Čelje	Ilirska Bistrica
Čelovnik	Sevnica
Čemše	Mirna Peč
Čemšenik	Zagorje ob Savi
Čentiba	Lendava
Čentur	Koper
Čepinci	Šalovci
Čeplez	Cerkno
Čeplje	Kočevje
Čeplje	Litija
Čeplje	Lukovica
Čeplje	Vransko
Čepno	Pivka
Čepovan	Nova Gorica
Čepulje	Kranj
Čermožiše	Žetale
Černelavci	Murska Sobota
Češča vas	Novo mesto
Češenik	Domžale
Češnjevek	Cerklje na Gorenjskem
Češnjevek	Trebnje
Češnjica pri Kropi	Radovljica
Češnjica	Ljubljana
Češnjice pri Moravčah	Moravče
Češnjice pri Trebelnem	Trebnje
Češnjice pri Zagradcu	Ivančna Gorica
Češnjice v Tuhinju	Kamnik
Češnjice	Lukovica
Češnjice	Sevnica
Četena Ravan	Gorenja vas-Poljane
Četež pri Strugah	Dobrepolje
Četež pri Turjaku	Velike Lašče
Čezsoča	Bovec
Čežarji	Koper
Čiginj	Tolmin
Čikečka vas	Moravske Toplice
Čilpah	Trebnje
Čimerno	Radeče
Činžat	Lovrenc na Pohorju
Čipnje	Komen
Čisti Breg	Šentjernej
Čohovo	Cerknica
Čolnišče	Zagorje ob Savi
Črenšovci	Črenšovci
Čreškova	Vojnik
Črešnjevci	Gornja Radgona
Črešnjevec ob Bistrici	Bistrica ob Sotli
Črešnjevec ob Dravi	Selnica ob Dravi
Črešnjevec pri Dragatušu	Črnomelj
Črešnjevec pri Oštrcu	Krško
Črešnjevec pri Semiču	Semič
Črešnjevec	Slovenska Bistrica
Črešnjevec	Vojnik
Črešnjice nad Pijavškim	Krško
Črešnjice pri Cerkljah	Brežice
Črešnjice	Novo mesto
Črešnjice	Vojnik
Črešnova	Zreče
Čreta pri Kokarjah	Nazarje
Čreta	Hoče-Slivnica
Čreta	Vransko
Čretež pri Krškem	Krško
Čretvež	Zreče
Črmlja	Trnovska vas
Črmljenšak	Lenart
Črmošnjice pri Stopičah	Novo mesto
Črmošnjice	Semič
Črna na Koroškem	Črna na Koroškem
Črna pri Kamniku	Kamnik
Črna vas	Ljubljana
Črnci	Gornja Radgona
Črnec	Ribnica
Črneča vas	Krško
Črneče	Dravograd
Črneška Gora	Dravograd
Črni Kal	Koper
Črni Potok pri Dragi	Loški Potok
Črni Potok pri Kočevju	Kočevje
Črni Potok pri Velikih Laščah	Ribnica
Črni Potok	Litija
Črni Vrh v Tuhinju	Kamnik
Črni Vrh	Dobrova-Polhov Gradec
Črni Vrh	Idrija
Črni Vrh	Tabor (občina)
Črniče	Ajdovščina
Črnivec	Radovljica
Črnolica	Šentjur
Črnomelj	Črnomelj
Črnotiče	Koper
Črnova	Velenje
Čučja Mlaka	Škocjan
Čudno Selo	Črnomelj
Čurile	Metlika
Čušperk	Grosuplje
Čužnja vas	Trebnje
