= Lindek =

- Location in Slovenia
- Coordinates: 46°21′33.07″N 15°18′53.09″E
- Country: Slovenia
- Traditional region: Styria
- Statistical region: Savinja
- Municipality: Vojnik

Area
  - Total: 4.31 km^{2} (1.66 sq mi)
- Elevation: 683 m (2,241 ft)

Population (2002)
  - Total: 86

Lindek (pronounced [ˈliːndɛk]) is a settlement in the Municipality of Vojnik in eastern Slovenia. It lies in the hills north of Frankolovo off the main road from Vojnik towards Slovenske Konjice. The area is part of the traditional region of Styria. It is now included with the rest of the municipality in the Savinja Statistical Region.

The ruins of Lindek Castle can still be seen just south of the settlement. It was first mentioned in written documents dating to 1264, and was extended and rebuilt in the 14th, 15th, and 16th centuries. It was abandoned in the 18th century.
