= Verpete =

- Location in Slovenia
- Coordinates: 46°20′15.88″N 15°19′29.12″E
- Country: Slovenia
- Traditional region: Styria
- Statistical region: Savinja
- Municipality: Vojnik

Area
  - Total: 0.97 km^{2} (0.37 sq mi)
- Elevation: 344.1 m (1,129 ft)

Population (2002)
  - Total: 130

Verpete (pronounced [ˈʋɛːɾpɛtɛ]) is a settlement in the Municipality of Vojnik in eastern Slovenia. It lies on the main road from Vojnik towards Slovenske Konjice, just north of Frankolovo. The area is part of the traditional region of Styria. It is now included with the rest of the municipality in the Savinja Statistical Region.

== Frankolovo Manor ==
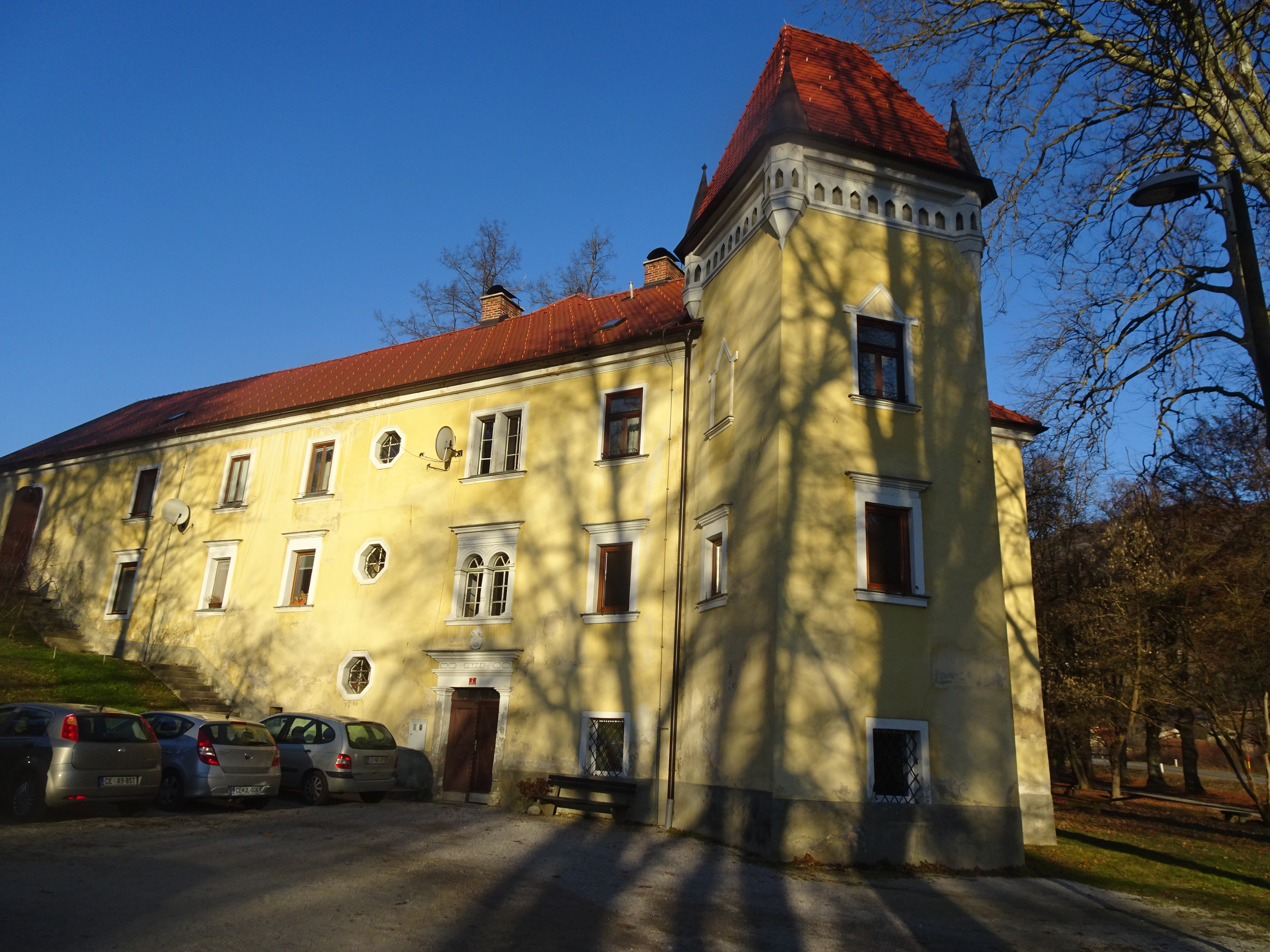
Frankolovo Manor in Verpete

Frankolovo Manor (also known as Verpete Manor, German: Rephenhof or Sternstein) stands in the southwest part of the settlement on a small slope above the Tesnica River along the main road from Frankolovo to Slovenske Konjice. The building dates to the 16th century with Baroque remodeling from the 17th century followed by neo-Gothic elements added in 1876. It is a three-story structure with two towers.
