= Globoče =

- Location in Slovenia
- Coordinates: 46°18′37.19″N 15°18′53.01″E
- Country: Slovenia
- Traditional region: Styria
- Statistical region: Savinja
- Municipality: Vojnik

Area
  - Total: 0.94 km^{2} (0.36 sq mi)
- Elevation: 290 m (950 ft)

Population (2002)
  - Total: 76

Globoče (pronounced [ɡlɔˈboːtʃɛ]) is a settlement in the Municipality of Vojnik in eastern Slovenia. It lies just south of Frankolovo off the main road from Vojnik towards Slovenske Konjice. The area is part of the traditional region of Styria. It is now included with the rest of the municipality in the Savinja Statistical Region.
