= Stražica, Vojnik =

Stražica
- Location in Slovenia
- Coordinates: 46°19′51.44″N 15°18′26.32″E
- Country: Slovenia
- Traditional region: Styria
- Statistical region: Savinja
- Municipality: Vojnik

Area
  - Total: 1.02 km^{2} (0.39 sq mi)
- Elevation: 427.3 m (1,402 ft)

Population (2002)
  - Total: 158

Stražica (pronounced [ˈstɾaːʒitsa]) is a settlement in the Municipality of Vojnik in eastern Slovenia. It lies in the hills northwest of Frankolovo off the main road from Vojnik to Slovenske Konjice. The area is part of the traditional region of Styria. It is now included with the rest of the municipality in the Savinja Statistical Region.
