= Beli Potok pri Frankolovem =

- Location in Slovenia
- Coordinates: 46°20′47.23″N 15°19′52.23″E
- Country: Slovenia
- Traditional region: Styria
- Statistical region: Savinja
- Municipality: Vojnik

Area
  - Total: 0.41 km^{2} (0.16 sq mi)
- Elevation: 440 m (1,440 ft)

Population (2002)
  - Total: 45

Beli Potok pri Frankolovem (pronounced [ˈbeːli ˈpɔːtɔk pɾi fɾaŋˈkoːlɔʋɛm]) is a small settlement in the Municipality of Vojnik in eastern Slovenia. It lies next to White Creek (Slovene: Beli potok), from which it gets its name, just off the main road north of Vojnik to Slovenske Konjice. The area is part of the traditional region of Styria. It is now included with the rest of the municipality in the Savinja Statistical Region.

== Name ==
The name of the settlement was changed from Beli Potok to Beli Potok pri Frankolovem in 1953.
