= Rakova Steza =

- Location in Slovenia
- Coordinates: 46°19′31.38″N 15°18′18.26″E
- Country: Slovenia
- Traditional region: Styria
- Statistical region: Savinja
- Municipality: Vojnik

Area
  - Total: 0.82 km^{2} (0.32 sq mi)
- Elevation: 378.1 m (1,240 ft)

Population (2002)
  - Total: 39

Rakova Steza (pronounced [ˈɾaːkɔʋa stəˈza] or [ˈɾaːkɔʋa ˈstəza]) is a small settlement east of Frankolovo in the Municipality of Vojnik in eastern Slovenia. The area is part of the traditional region of Styria and is now included with the rest of the municipality in the Savinja Statistical Region.
