= Vine, Vojnik =

Vine
- Location in Slovenia
- Coordinates: 46°19′50.36″N 15°14′46.55″E
- Country: Slovenia
- Traditional region: Styria
- Statistical region: Savinja
- Municipality: Vojnik

Area
  - Total: 0.84 km^{2} (0.32 sq mi)
- Elevation: 429 m (1,407 ft)

Population (2002)
  - Total: 76

Vine (pronounced [ˈʋiːnɛ]) is a settlement in the Municipality of Vojnik in eastern Slovenia. It lies in the hills northwest of Nova Cerkev. The area is part of the traditional region of Styria. It is now included with the rest of the municipality in the Savinja Statistical Region.
