= Hrastnik, Vojnik =

Hrastnik
- Location in Slovenia
- Coordinates: 46°17′23.74″N 15°22′6.03″E
- Country: Slovenia
- Traditional region: Styria
- Statistical region: Savinja
- Municipality: Vojnik

Area
  - Total: 0.83 km^{2} (0.32 sq mi)
- Elevation: 434.7 m (1,426 ft)

Population (2002)
  - Total: 15

Hrastnik (pronounced [ˈxɾaːstnik]) is a small settlement in the hills east of Vojnik in eastern Slovenia. The area is part of the traditional region of Styria. It is now included with the rest of the Municipality of Vojnik in the Savinja Statistical Region.
