= Dol pod Gojko =

- Location in Slovenia
- Coordinates: 46°20′15″N 15°18′57.79″E
- Country: Slovenia
- Traditional region: Styria
- Statistical region: Savinja
- Municipality: Vojnik

Area
  - Total: 1.36 km^{2} (0.53 sq mi)
- Elevation: 389.4 m (1,278 ft)

Population (2002)
  - Total: 184

Dol pod Gojko (pronounced [ˈdoːl pɔd ˈɡoːi̯kɔ]) is a settlement in the Municipality of Vojnik in eastern Slovenia. The area is part of the traditional region of Styria. It is now included with the rest of the municipality in the Savinja Statistical Region.

== Name ==
The name of the settlement was changed from Dol to Dol pod Gojko in 1953.

== Church ==
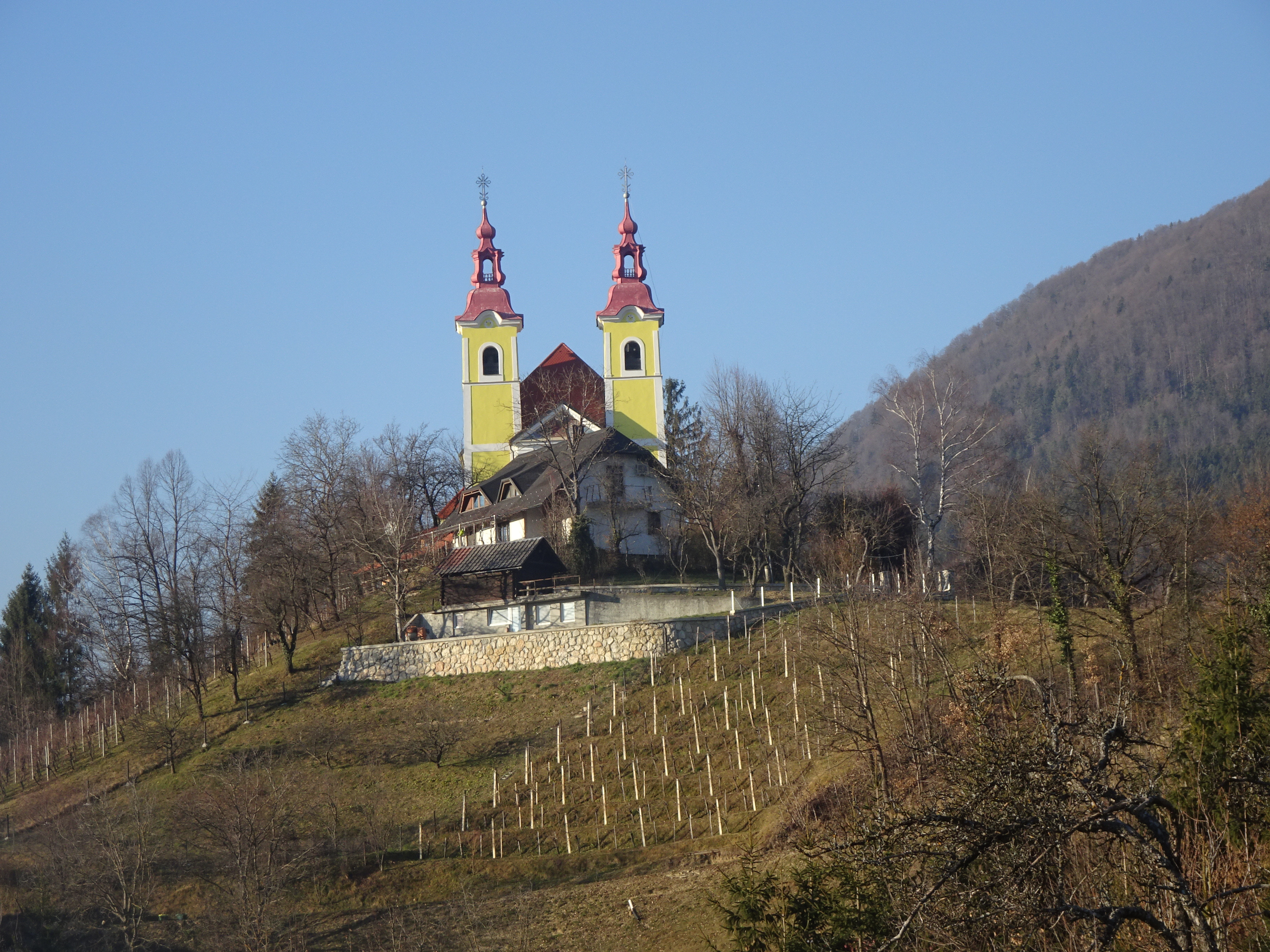
Holy Trinity Church

The local church is dedicated to the Holy Trinity and belongs to the Parish of Frankolovo. It was built between 1848 and 1849 and is dominated by its double spire. Its paintings are the work of the Friulian painter Jakob Brollo (sl) (1834–1918) and its furnishings date from the time of the church's construction. The church stands on Gojka Hill in the settlement.
