= Zabukovje, Vojnik =

Zabukovje
- Location in Slovenia
- Coordinates: 46°20′29.08″N 15°17′59.88″E
- Country: Slovenia
- Traditional region: Styria
- Statistical region: Savinja
- Municipality: Vojnik

Area
  - Total: 0.62 km^{2} (0.24 sq mi)
- Elevation: 424.7 m (1,393 ft)

Population (2002)
  - Total: 18

Zabukovje (pronounced [zaˈbuːkɔu̯jɛ]) is a small settlement in the Municipality of Vojnik in eastern Slovenia. It lies in the hills north of Nova Cerkev. It is part of the traditional region of Styria. It is now included with the rest of the municipality in the Savinja Statistical Region.
