= Podgorje pod Čerinom =

- Location in Slovenia
- Coordinates: 46°19′38.14″N 15°20′27.34″E
- Country: Slovenia
- Traditional region: Styria
- Statistical region: Savinja
- Municipality: Vojnik

Area
  - Total: 2.9 km^{2} (1.1 sq mi)
- Elevation: 447.2 m (1,467 ft)

Population (2002)
  - Total: 96

Podgorje pod Čerinom (pronounced [pɔdˈɡoːɾjɛ pɔt tʃɛˈɾiːnɔm]) is a settlement in the Municipality of Vojnik in eastern Slovenia. It lies in the hills east of Frankolovo. The area is part of the traditional region of Styria. It is now included with the rest of the municipality in the Savinja Statistical Region.

== Name ==
The name of the settlement was changed from Podgorje to Podgorje pod Čerinom in 1953.
