= Dedni Vrh =

Dedni Vrh is a Slovene place name that may refer to:

- Dedni Vrh, Krško, a village in the Municipality of Krško, southeastern Slovenia
- Dedni Vrh pri Vojniku, a village in the Municipality of Vojnik, northeastern Slovenia
