= Polže =

- Location in Slovenia
- Coordinates: 46°18′54.1″N 15°16′24″E
- Country: Slovenia
- Traditional region: Styria
- Statistical region: Savinja
- Municipality: Vojnik

Area
  - Total: 0.69 km^{2} (0.27 sq mi)
- Elevation: 320.2 m (1,051 ft)

Population (2002)
  - Total: 106

Polže (pronounced [ˈpoːu̯ʒɛ]) is a small settlement west of Nova Cerkev in the Municipality of Vojnik in eastern Slovenia. The area is part of the traditional region of Styria and is now included in the Savinja Statistical Region.
