= Trnovlje =

Trnovlje is a Slovene place name that may refer to:

Settlements

- Trnovlje pri Celju, a village in the City Municipality of Celje, central-eastern Slovenia
- Trnovlje pri Socki, a village in the Municipality of Vojnik, northeastern Slovenia
- Trnovlje, a former name of Cerklje na Gorenjskem
- Trnovlje (local community), a local community of Celje
