= Lemberg pri Novi Cerkvi =

Lemberg pri Novi Cerkvi Lemberg pri Strmcu (1953–1992)
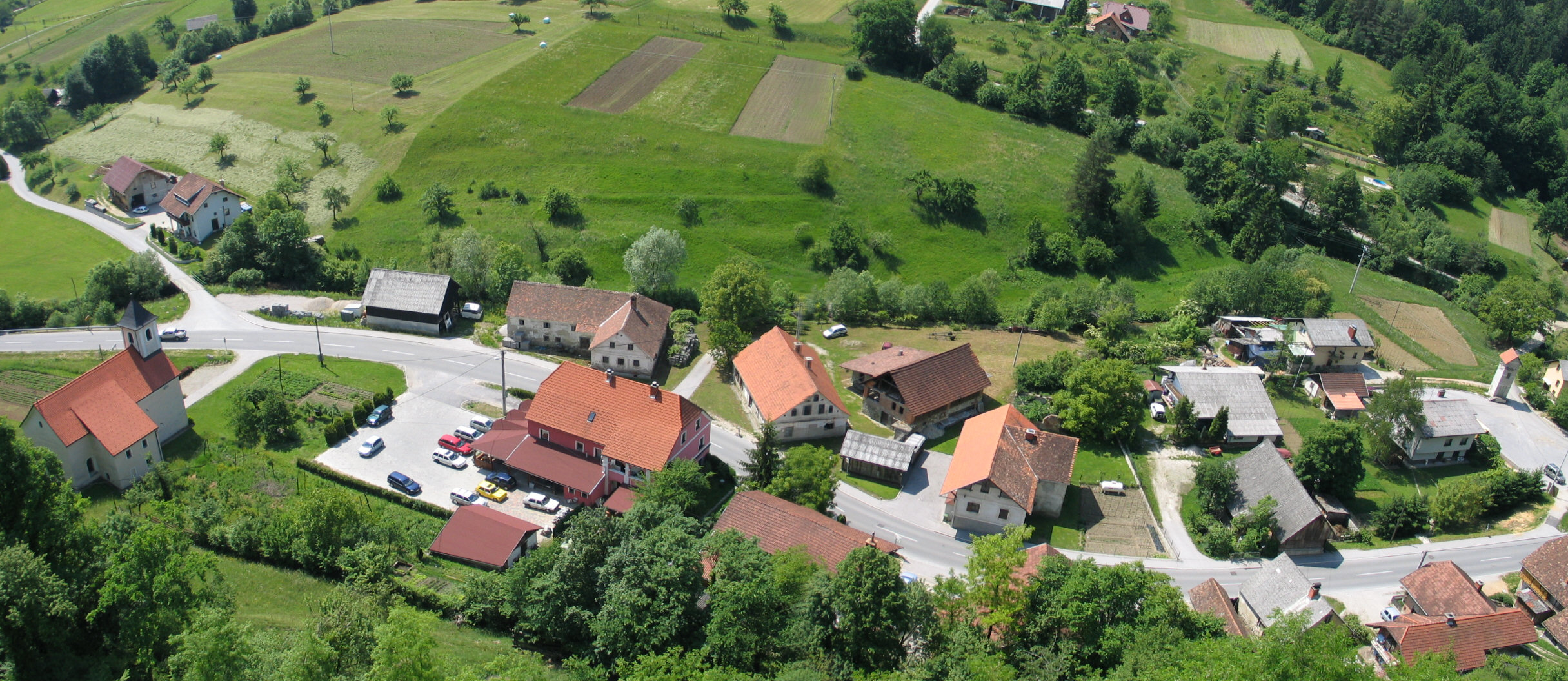

- Location in Slovenia
- Coordinates: 46°19′16.66″N 15°14′52.95″E
- Country: Slovenia
- Traditional region: Styria
- Statistical region: Savinja
- Municipality: Vojnik

Area
  - Total: 1.78 km^{2} (0.69 sq mi)
- Elevation: 317.1 m (1,040 ft)

Population (2002)
  - Total: 119

Lemberg pri Novi Cerkvi (pronounced [ˈleːmbɛɾk pɾi ˈnɔːʋi ˈtseːɾkʋi]) is a village in the Municipality of Vojnik in eastern Slovenia. The area is part of the traditional region of Styria. It is now included with the rest of the municipality in the Savinja Statistical Region.

== Name ==
The name of the settlement was changed from Lemberg to Lemberg pri Strmcu (literally, 'Lemberg near Strmec') in 1953. The name was changed again, from Lemberg pri Strmcu to Lemberg pri Novi Cerkvi (literally, 'Lemberg near Nova Cerkev'), in 1992. The 1953 and 1992 changes corresponded to the name changes of the neighboring settlement of Nova Cerkev (literally, 'New Church'), renamed Strmec in 1952 and restored to Nova Cerkev in 1992. The name changes were based on the 1948 Law on Names of Settlements and Designations of Squares, Streets, and Buildings as part of efforts by Slovenia's postwar communist government to remove religious elements from toponyms.

== Church ==
The local church is dedicated to Saint Catherine and belongs to the Parish of Nova Cerkev. It was built in 1841. Lemberg Castle is a 13th-century castle with a 15th-century extension that stands just above the village.
