= Straža pri Novi Cerkvi =

Straža pri Novi Cerkvi Straža pri Strmcu (1953–1992)
- Location in Slovenia
- Coordinates: 46°20′18.21″N 15°17′5.1″E
- Country: Slovenia
- Traditional region: Styria
- Statistical region: Savinja
- Municipality: Vojnik

Area
  - Total: 1.12 km^{2} (0.43 sq mi)
- Elevation: 421.2 m (1,382 ft)

Population (2002)
  - Total: 45

Straža pri Novi Cerkvi (pronounced [ˈstɾaːʒa pɾi ˈnɔːʋi ˈtseːɾkʋi]) is a settlement in the hills north of Nova Cerkev in the Municipality of Vojnik in eastern Slovenia. It is part of the traditional region of Styria and is now included with the rest of the municipality in the Savinja Statistical Region.

== Name ==
The name of the settlement was changed from Straža to Straža pri Strmcu in 1953. It was renamed again in 1992 to Straža pri Novi Cerkvi (literally, 'Straža near Nova Cerkev') after the restoration of the pre-communist name of the latter settlement. The name Straža is found in various toponyms, oronyms, and hydronyms in Slovenia. It is derived from the common noun straža 'guards, guard post', often referring to a place where watch was kept during the danger of Ottoman attacks.
