= Velika Raven =

- Location in Slovenia
- Coordinates: 46°21′7.3″N 15°15′51.45″E
- Country: Slovenia
- Traditional region: Styria
- Statistical region: Savinja
- Municipality: Vojnik

Area
  - Total: 1.87 km^{2} (0.72 sq mi)
- Elevation: 560 m (1,840 ft)

Population (2002)
  - Total: 29

Velika Raven (pronounced [ˈʋeːlika ˈɾaːʋən]) is a small settlement in the hills above the right bank of the Hudinja River in the Municipality of Vojnik in eastern Slovenia. The area is part of the traditional region of Styria. It is now included with the rest of the municipality in the Savinja Statistical Region.
