= Višnja Vas =

- Location in Slovenia
- Coordinates: 46°18′15.72″N 15°17′25.96″E
- Country: Slovenia
- Traditional region: Styria
- Statistical region: Savinja
- Municipality: Vojnik

Area
  - Total: 2.82 km^{2} (1.09 sq mi)
- Elevation: 280.4 m (920 ft)

Population (2002)
  - Total: 239

Višnja Vas (pronounced [ˈʋiːʃnja ˈʋaːs]; Slovene: Višnja vas) is a settlement on the Hudinja River in the Municipality of Vojnik in eastern Slovenia. The area is part of the traditional region of Styria. It is now included with the rest of the municipality in the Savinja Statistical Region.
