= Kladnart =

- Location in Slovenia
- Coordinates: 46°18′29.25″N 15°21′39.83″E
- Country: Slovenia
- Traditional region: Styria
- Statistical region: Savinja
- Municipality: Vojnik

Area
  - Total: 0.59 km^{2} (0.23 sq mi)
- Elevation: 425.9 m (1,397 ft)

Population (2002)
  - Total: 6

Kladnart (pronounced [ˈklaːdnart]) is a small settlement in the Municipality of Vojnik in eastern Slovenia. It has a relatively remote location in the hills east of Vojnik and a permanent population of only six (2002 statistics). The area is part of the traditional region of Styria. It is now included with the rest of the municipality in the Savinja Statistical Region.
