= Konjsko, Vojnik =

Konjsko
- Location in Slovenia
- Coordinates: 46°17′43.41″N 15°16′56.82″E
- Country: Slovenia
- Traditional region: Styria
- Statistical region: Savinja
- Municipality: Vojnik

Area
  - Total: 1.03 km^{2} (0.40 sq mi)
- Elevation: 334 m (1,096 ft)

Population (2002)
  - Total: 73

Konjsko (pronounced [ˈkoːnskɔ]) is a settlement in the Municipality of Vojnik in eastern Slovenia. It lies in the hills west of Vojnik. The area is part of the traditional region of Styria and is now included in the Savinja Statistical Region.
