= Straža pri Dolu =

- Location in Slovenia
- Coordinates: 46°20′8.63″N 15°18′15.66″E
- Country: Slovenia
- Traditional region: Styria
- Statistical region: Savinja
- Municipality: Vojnik

Area
  - Total: 0.08 km^{2} (0.031 sq mi)
- Elevation: 426.8 m (1,400 ft)

Population (2002)
  - Total: 22

Straža pri Dolu (pronounced [ˈstɾaːʒa pɾi ˈdoːlu]) is a small settlement in the hills northwest of Frankolovo in the Municipality of Vojnik in eastern Slovenia. The area is part of the traditional region of Styria. It is now included in the Savinja Statistical Region.
