= Bezovica, Vojnik =

Bezovica
- Location in Slovenia
- Coordinates: 46°17′31.38″N 15°21′3″E
- Country: Slovenia
- Traditional region: Styria
- Statistical region: Savinja
- Municipality: Vojnik

Area
  - Total: 1.01 km^{2} (0.39 sq mi)
- Elevation: 301 m (988 ft)

Population (2002)
  - Total: 46

Bezovica (pronounced [bɛzɔˈʋiːtsa]) is a small settlement in the Municipality of Vojnik in eastern Slovenia. The area is part of the traditional region of Styria. It is now included with the rest of the municipality in the Savinja Statistical Region.

== Geography ==
Bezovica is a scattered settlement along the upper course of Bezovičica Creek, a tributary of the Ložnica River, and on the ridge north of the valley along the road to Ivenca. The soil in the area is sandy and partially loamy.

== Name ==
The name Bezovica is derived from the Slavic common noun *bъzъ 'elder', thus originally referring to the vegetation. Similar names based on the same root are common in Slovenian ethnic territory (e.g., Basovizza in Italy and Bezgovica) as well as in other Slavic areas (e.g., Bazje in Croatia, Bzová in the Czech Republic, etc.).

== Mass grave ==
Bezovica is the site of a mass grave from the period immediately after the Second World War. The Bezovica Mass Grave (Slovene: Grobišče Bezovica) is located in a meadow and in a woods between the Preložnik farm (locally known as the Rihtar farm) and the Krameršek farm. It contains the remains of six German and Slovene civilians murdered in June 1945.
