= Tomaž nad Vojnikom =

Tomaž nad Vojnikom Sveti Tomaž nad Vojnikom (until 1955)
- Location in Slovenia
- Coordinates: 46°17′14.15″N 15°19′37.39″E
- Country: Slovenia
- Traditional region: Styria
- Statistical region: Savinja
- Municipality: Vojnik

Area
  - Total: 2.06 km^{2} (0.80 sq mi)
- Elevation: 323 m (1,060 ft)

Population (2002)
  - Total: 59

Tomaž nad Vojnikom (pronounced [tɔˈmaːʃ nad ˈʋoːi̯nikɔm]) is a settlement in the Municipality of Vojnik in eastern Slovenia. It lies in the hills east of Vojnik. The area is part of the traditional region of Styria. It is now included with the rest of the municipality in the Savinja Statistical Region.

== Name ==
The name of the settlement was changed from Sveti Tomaž nad Vojnikom (literally, 'Saint Thomas above Vojnik') to Tomaž nad Vojnikom (literally, 'Thomas above Vojnik') in 1955. The name was changed on the basis of the 1948 Law on Names of Settlements and Designations of Squares, Streets, and Buildings as part of efforts by Slovenia's postwar communist government to remove religious elements from toponyms.

== Church ==
The local church, from which the settlement gets its name, is dedicated to Saint Thomas and belongs to the Parish of Vojnik. It was built in a Neo-Romanesque style in the 1890s on the site of an earlier church first mentioned in written documents dating to the 13th century.
