= Zlateče, Vojnik =

Zlateče
- Location in Slovenia
- Coordinates: 46°19′59.87″N 15°16′15.44″E
- Country: Slovenia
- Traditional region: Styria
- Statistical region: Savinja
- Municipality: Vojnik

Area
  - Total: 0.96 km^{2} (0.37 sq mi)
- Elevation: 394.2 m (1,293 ft)

Population (2002)
  - Total: 106

Zlateče (pronounced [zlaˈteːtʃɛ]) is a settlement in the Municipality of Vojnik in eastern Slovenia. It lies north of Nova Cerkev, on the left side of the road to Vitanje. The area is part of the traditional region of Styria. It is now included with the rest of the municipality in the Savinja Statistical Region.
