= Črešnjice, Vojnik =

Črešnjice
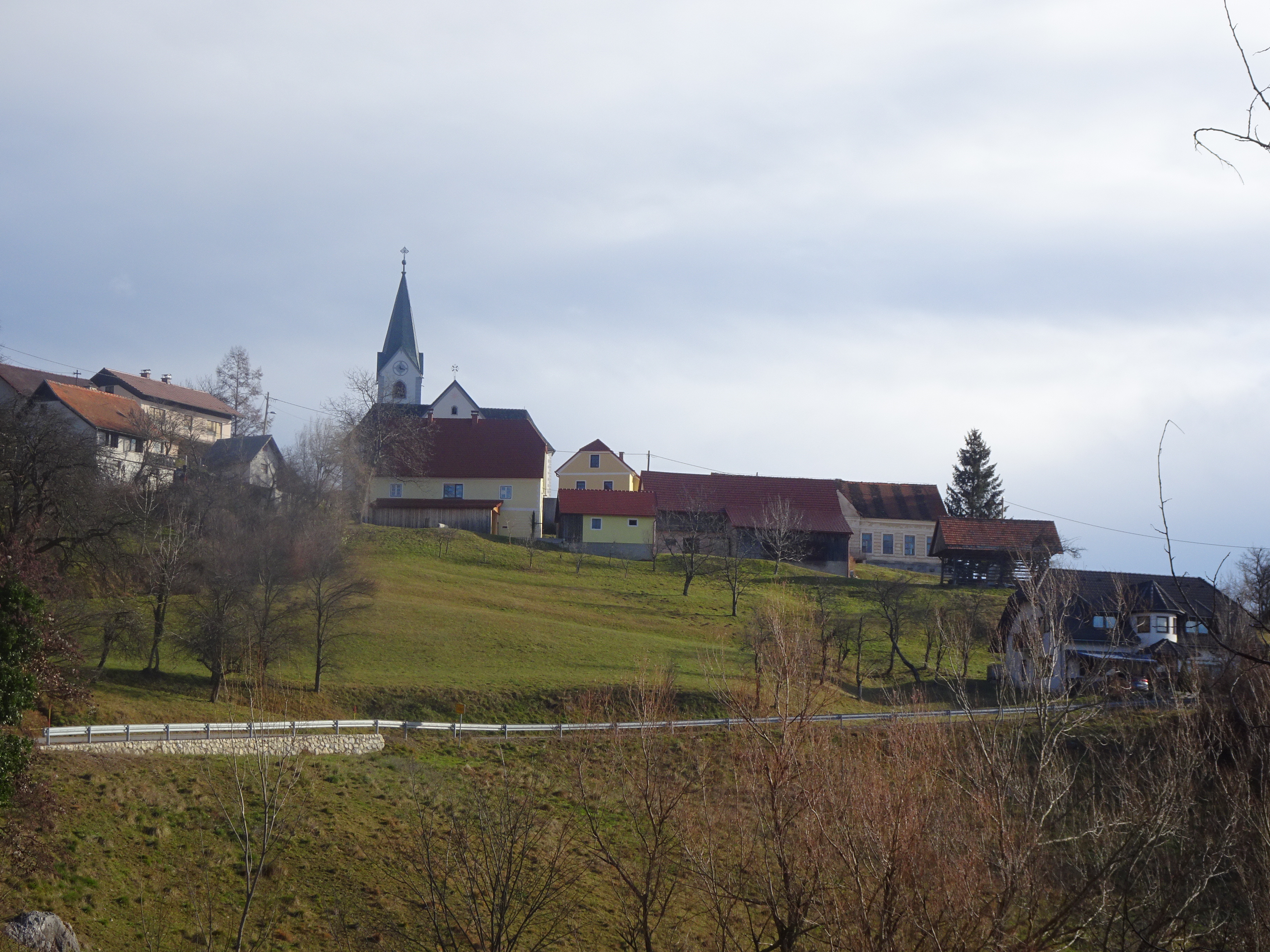

- Location in Slovenia
- Coordinates: 46°19′34.81″N 15°20′58.18″E
- Country: Slovenia
- Traditional region: Styria
- Statistical region: Savinja
- Municipality: Vojnik

Area
  - Total: 1.62 km^{2} (0.63 sq mi)
- Elevation: 512.3 m (1,681 ft)

Population (2002)
  - Total: 57

Črešnjice (pronounced [ˈtʃɾeːʃnjitsɛ]) is a settlement in the Municipality of Vojnik in eastern Slovenia. The area is part of the traditional region of Styria. It is now included with the rest of the municipality in the Savinja Statistical Region.

The village stands on the local road from Stražica past Mount Konjice (Slovene: Konjiška gora) through Sojek, towards the Žiče Charterhouse, on the southern slope of the mountain, under Stolpnik peak.

== Parish church ==
The parish church of Our Lady of the Rosary in the village belongs to the Roman Catholic Diocese of Celje and stands on an ancient pilgrimage route.

It has a choir dating back to the 14th century, but was restyled in the Baroque in the 17th century. The original statue of Mary was desecrated and destroyed during Ottoman raids in 1482. The second one was preserved, but is now privately owned. The third image of Mary, venerated by pilgrims, was a painting on canvas and is now kept in the side chapel. Today's main altar with a statue of Mary was made in 1710 by Franc Zamlik, a master craftsman from Slovenske Konjice. Preserved elements of the Gothic church include parts of the frescoes by chancel arch wall, a stained-glass window, and a Gothic niche for the sedilia in the choir.

The first church here was a chapel, build before 1402, probably by Žiče Charterhouse monks, when the vicarage next the church was also built. During the Ottoman raids, both structures were burned in 1482. The reconsecration of the church, after it was greatly expanded and improved, is recorded in Paolo Santonino's itinerary. After the devastation of the first Ottoman invasion, the church was surrounded by a large defensive wall, fortified with several towers. The last one was demolished at the end of the 19th century.

== Sources ==
- Medved Drago Vojnik: Vojnik, Frankolovo, Nova Cerkev, Fit Media d.o.o., Celje, 2011. COBISS 4201307691 ISBN 978-961-6283-46-5
