= Ivenca =

- Location in Slovenia
- Coordinates: 46°18′5.83″N 15°18′31.8″E
- Country: Slovenia
- Traditional region: Styria
- Statistical region: Savinja
- Municipality: Vojnik

Area
  - Total: 0.99 km^{2} (0.38 sq mi)
- Elevation: 279 m (915 ft)

Population (2002)
  - Total: 167

Ivenca (pronounced [ˈiːʋɛntsa]) is a village in the Municipality of Vojnik in eastern Slovenia. It lies on the main road towards Slovenske Konjice, just north of Vojnik. The area is part of the traditional region of Styria. It is now included with the rest of the municipality in the Savinja Statistical Region.
