= Pristava, Vojnik =

Pristava
- Location in Slovenia
- Coordinates: 46°16′37.81″N 15°19′57.26″E
- Country: Slovenia
- Traditional region: Styria
- Statistical region: Savinja
- Municipality: Vojnik

Area
  - Total: 1.06 km^{2} (0.41 sq mi)
- Elevation: 269.9 m (885 ft)

Population (2002)
  - Total: 121

Pristava (pronounced [ˈpɾiːstaʋa]) is a small settlement in the Municipality of Vojnik in eastern Slovenia. It lies in the valley of Ložnica Creek southeast of Vojnik. The area is part of the traditional region of Styria. It is now included in the Savinja Statistical Region.
