= Gabrovec pri Dramljah =

- Location in Slovenia
- Coordinates: 46°17′42.6″N 15°21′40.92″E
- Country: Slovenia
- Traditional region: Styria
- Statistical region: Savinja
- Municipality: Vojnik

Area
  - Total: 1.37 km^{2} (0.53 sq mi)
- Elevation: 352.6 m (1,157 ft)

Population (2002)
  - Total: 30

Gabrovec pri Dramljah (pronounced [ˈɡaːbɾɔʋəts pɾi ˈdɾaːmljax]) is a small dispersed settlement in the Municipality of Vojnik in eastern Slovenia. The area is part of the traditional region of Styria. It is now included in the Savinja Statistical Region.

== Name ==
The name of the settlement was changed from Gabrovec to Gabrovec pri Dramljah in 1953.
