= Gradišče pri Vojniku =

- Location in Slovenia
- Coordinates: 46°16′59.78″N 15°20′17.48″E
- Country: Slovenia
- Traditional region: Styria
- Statistical region: Savinja
- Municipality: Vojnik

Area
  - Total: 0.69 km^{2} (0.27 sq mi)
- Elevation: 373.3 m (1,225 ft)

Population (2002)
  - Total: 39

Gradišče pri Vojniku (pronounced [ɡɾaˈdiːʃtʃɛ pɾi ˈʋoːi̯niku]) is a settlement in the Municipality of Vojnik in eastern Slovenia. It lies in the hills east of Vojnik. The area is part of the traditional region of Styria. It is now included with the rest of the municipality in the Savinja Statistical Region.

== Name ==
The name of the settlement was changed from Gradišče to Gradišče pri Vojniku in 1955.
