= Lešje, Vojnik =

Lešje
- Location in Slovenia
- Coordinates: 46°16′52.24″N 15°16′52.35″E
- Country: Slovenia
- Traditional region: Styria
- Statistical region: Savinja
- Municipality: Vojnik

Area
  - Total: 0.59 km^{2} (0.23 sq mi)
- Elevation: 319.3 m (1,048 ft)

Population (2002)
  - Total: 45

Lešje (pronounced [ˈleːʃjɛ]) is a settlement in the Municipality of Vojnik in eastern Slovenia. It lies just east of Arclin next to Lake Šmartno. The area is part of the traditional region of Styria. It is now included with the rest of the municipality in the Savinja Statistical Region.
