= Hrenova =

- Location in Slovenia
- Coordinates: 46°19′0.06″N 15°15′28.86″E
- Country: Slovenia
- Traditional region: Styria
- Statistical region: Savinja
- Municipality: Vojnik

Area
  - Total: 1.87 km^{2} (0.72 sq mi)
- Elevation: 309 m (1,014 ft)

Population (2002)
  - Total: 164

Hrenova (pronounced [ˈxɾeːnɔʋa]) is a settlement in the Municipality of Vojnik in eastern Slovenia. The area is part of the traditional region of Styria. It is now included with the rest of the municipality in the Savinja Statistical Region.

Archaeological evidence from the Big Peak (Slovene: Veliki vrh) site near the village has shown Iron Age and Late Antiquity settlement layers.
