= Razgor, Vojnik =

Razgor
- Location in Slovenia
- Coordinates: 46°16′26.05″N 15°20′33.62″E
- Country: Slovenia
- Traditional region: Styria
- Statistical region: Savinja
- Municipality: Vojnik

Area
  - Total: 1.57 km^{2} (0.61 sq mi)
- Elevation: 321.9 m (1,056 ft)

Population (2002)
  - Total: 130

Razgor (pronounced [ˈɾaːzɡɔɾ]) is a village in the Municipality of Vojnik in eastern Slovenia. The area is part of the traditional region of Styria. It is now included with the rest of the municipality in the Savinja Statistical Region.
