= Brdce, Vojnik =

Brdce
- Location in Slovenia
- Coordinates: 46°19′5.9″N 15°21′23.71″E
- Country: Slovenia
- Traditional region: Styria
- Statistical region: Savinja
- Municipality: Vojnik

Area
  - Total: 1.43 km^{2} (0.55 sq mi)
- Elevation: 383.8 m (1,259 ft)

Population (2002)
  - Total: 49

Brdce (pronounced [ˈbəɾtsɛ]) is a small settlement in the Municipality of Vojnik in eastern Slovenia. The area is part of the traditional region of Styria. It is now included with the rest of the municipality in the Savinja Statistical Region.

A small roadside chapel-shrine in the village dates to the late 19th century.
