= Koblek =

- Location in Slovenia
- Coordinates: 46°16′54.7″N 15°19′44.28″E
- Country: Slovenia
- Traditional region: Styria
- Statistical region: Savinja
- Municipality: Vojnik

Area
  - Total: 0.31 km^{2} (0.12 sq mi)
- Elevation: 307.8 m (1,010 ft)

Population (2002)
  - Total: 21

Koblek (pronounced [ˈkoːblɛk]) is a small settlement in the Municipality of Vojnik in eastern Slovenia. The area is part of the traditional region of Styria. It is now included in the Savinja Statistical Region.
