= Municipality of Vojnik =

Municipality of Slovenia

Municipality of Vojnik Občina Vojnik
- Municipality
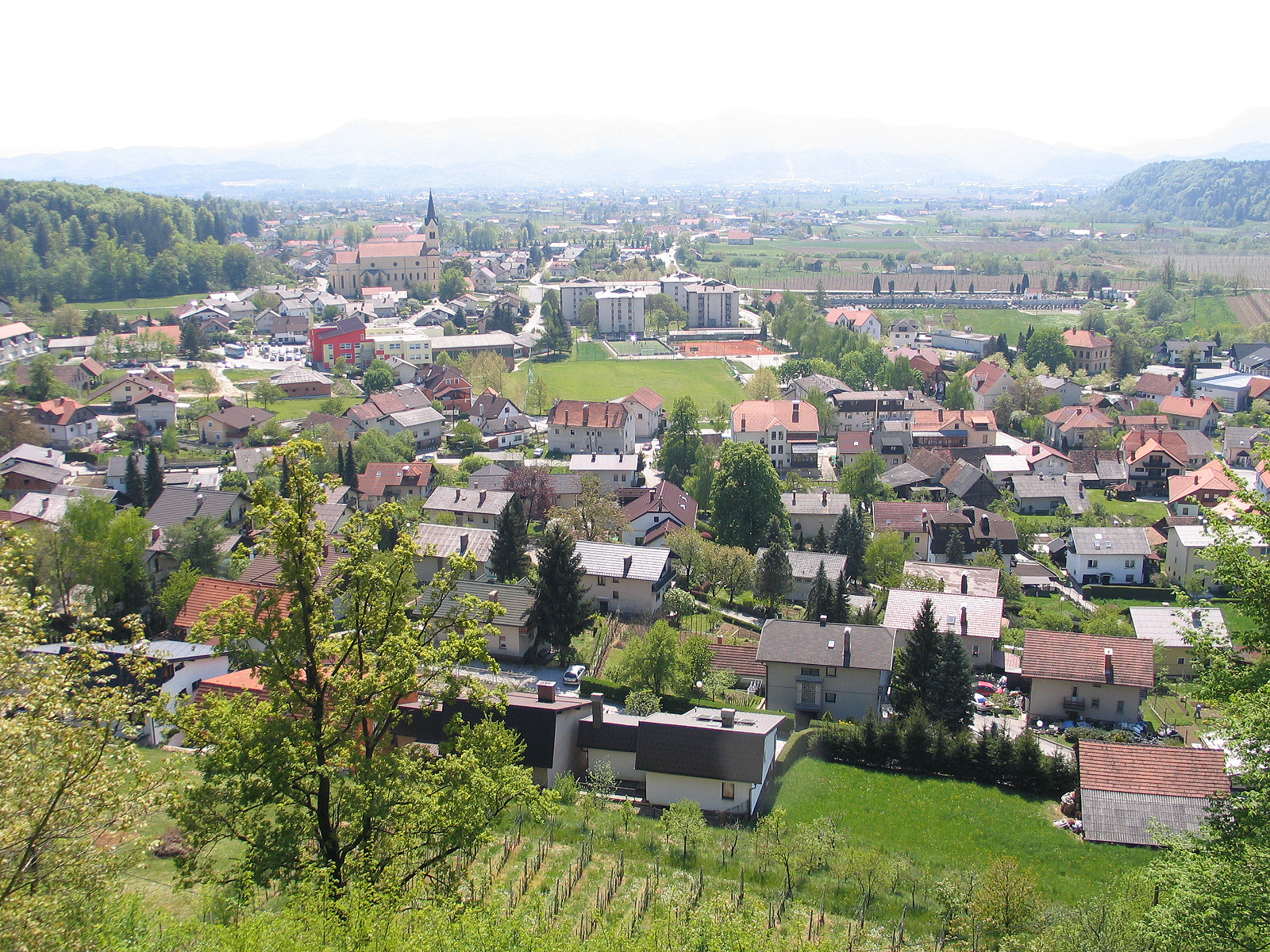

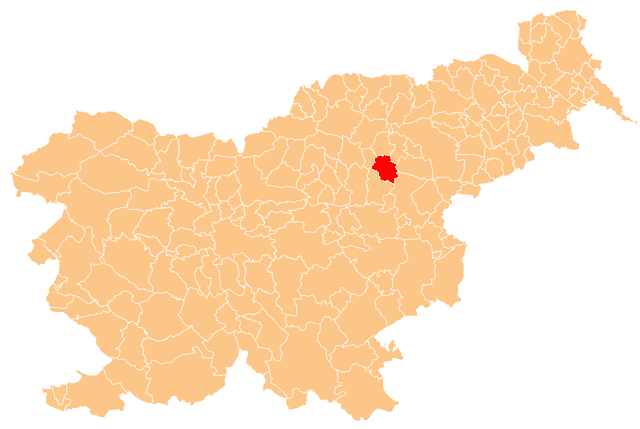
- Location of the Municipality of Vojnik in Slovenia
- Coordinates: 46°18′N 15°18′E
- Country: Slovenia

Government
  - Mayor: Benedikt Podergajs

Area
  - Total: 75.3 km^{2} (29.1 sq mi)

Population (2002)
  - Total: 7,825
  - Density: 104/km^{2} (269/sq mi)
- Time zone: UTC+01 (CET)
  - Summer (DST): UTC+02 (CEST)
- Website: vojnik.si

The Municipality of Vojnik (pronounced [ˈʋoːi̯nik]; Slovene: Občina Vojnik) is a municipality in eastern Slovenia. The seat of the municipality is the town of Vojnik. The area is part of the traditional region of Styria. The municipality is now included in the Savinja Statistical Region.

== Settlements ==
In addition to the municipal seat of Vojnik, the municipality also includes the following settlements:

- Arclin
- Beli Potok pri Frankolovem
- Bezenškovo Bukovje
- Bezovica
- Bovše
- Brdce
- Čreškova
- Črešnjevec
- Črešnjice
- Dedni Vrh pri Vojniku
- Dol pod Gojko
- Frankolovo
- Gabrovec pri Dramljah
- Globoče
- Gradišče pri Vojniku
- Homec
- Hrastnik
- Hrenova
- Ilovca
- Ivenca
- Jankova
- Kladnart
- Koblek
- Konjsko
- Landek
- Lemberg pri Novi Cerkvi
- Lešje
- Lindek
- Lipa pri Frankolovem
- Male Dole
- Nova Cerkev
- Novake
- Podgorje pod Čerinom
- Polže
- Pristava
- Rakova Steza
- Razdelj
- Razgor
- Razgorce
- Rove
- Selce
- Socka
- Straža pri Dolu
- Straža pri Novi Cerkvi
- Stražica
- Tomaž nad Vojnikom
- Trnovlje pri Socki
- Velika Raven
- Verpete
- Vine
- Vizore
- Višnja Vas
- Zabukovje
- Želče
- Zlateče
