= Razgorce =

- Location in Slovenia
- Coordinates: 46°18′8″N 15°20′57.62″E
- Country: Slovenia
- Traditional region: Styria
- Statistical region: Savinja
- Municipality: Vojnik

Area
  - Total: 0.33 km^{2} (0.13 sq mi)
- Elevation: 328.1 m (1,076 ft)

Population (2002)
  - Total: 14

Razgorce (pronounced [ˈɾaːzɡɔɾtsɛ]) is a small settlement in the Municipality of Vojnik in eastern Slovenia. It lies in the hills northeast of Vojnik. The area is part of the traditional region of Styria. It is now included with the rest of the municipality in the Savinja Statistical Region.
