= Trnovlje pri Socki =

- Location in Slovenia
- Coordinates: 46°20′37.94″N 15°17′18.3″E
- Country: Slovenia
- Traditional region: Styria
- Statistical region: Savinja
- Municipality: Vojnik

Area
  - Total: 1.25 km^{2} (0.48 sq mi)
- Elevation: 369.3 m (1,212 ft)

Population (2002)
  - Total: 153

Trnovlje pri Socki (pronounced [təɾˈnoːu̯ljɛ pɾi ˈsoːtski]) is a settlement in the hills east of Socka in the Municipality of Vojnik in eastern Slovenia. The area is part of the traditional region of Styria. It is now included with the rest of the municipality in the Savinja Statistical Region.

== Name ==
The name of the settlement was changed from Trnovlje to Trnovlje pri Socki in 1953.
