= Landek, Vojnik =

Landek
- Location in Slovenia
- Coordinates: 46°20′1.63″N 15°15′16.53″E
- Country: Slovenia
- Traditional region: Styria
- Statistical region: Savinja
- Municipality: Vojnik

Area
  - Total: 1.02 km^{2} (0.39 sq mi)
- Elevation: 358.8 m (1,177 ft)

Population (2002)
  - Total: 61

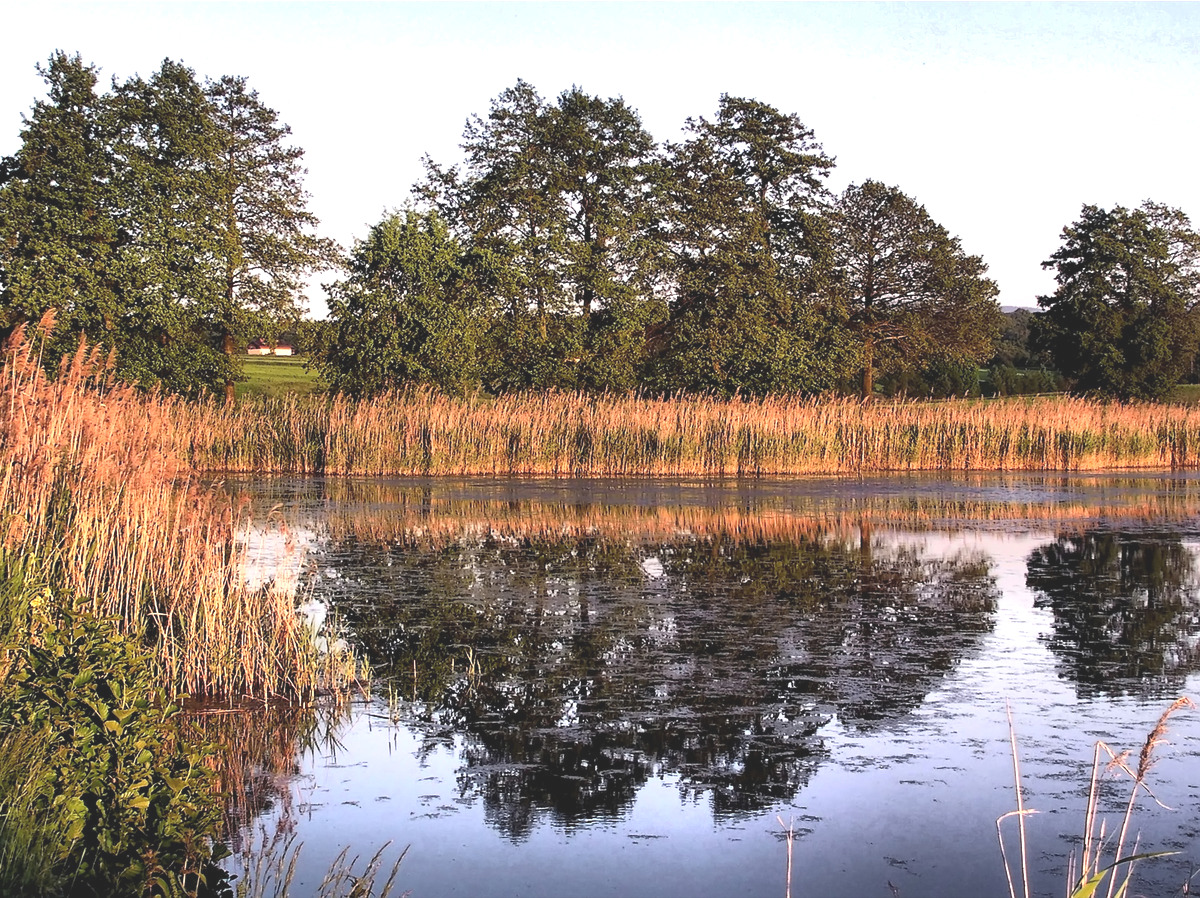
Pond and landscape in Landek, Vojnik, Slovenia

Landek (pronounced [ˈlaːndɛk]) is a small settlement in the Municipality of Vojnik in eastern Slovenia. The area is included in the Savinja Statistical Region. It is part of the traditional region of Styria.
