= Rove, Vojnik =

Rove
- Location in Slovenia
- Coordinates: 46°19′12.92″N 15°20′10.82″E
- Country: Slovenia
- Traditional region: Styria
- Statistical region: Savinja
- Municipality: Vojnik

Area
  - Total: 0.61 km^{2} (0.24 sq mi)
- Elevation: 346.7 m (1,137 ft)

Population (2002)
  - Total: 107

Rove (pronounced [ˈɾɔːʋɛ]) is a settlement in the hills east of Frankolovo in the Municipality of Vojnik in eastern Slovenia. The area is part of the traditional region of Styria and is now included with the rest of the municipality in the Savinja Statistical Region.
