= Socka =

- Location in Slovenia
- Coordinates: 46°20′27.68″N 15°16′35.22″E
- Country: Slovenia
- Traditional region: Styria
- Statistical region: Savinja
- Municipality: Vojnik

Area
  - Total: 2.52 km^{2} (0.97 sq mi)
- Elevation: 332.4 m (1,091 ft)

Population (2002)
  - Total: 363
- Time zone: UTC+01:00 (CET)
  - Summer (DST): UTC+02:00 (CEST)

Socka (pronounced [ˈsoːtska]; German: Einödt) is a settlement in the Municipality of Vojnik in eastern Slovenia. It lies on the road north of Nova Cerkev towards Vitanje. The area is part of the traditional region of Styria. It is now included with the rest of the municipality in the Savinja Statistical Region.

== Name ==
Socka was attested in written sources in 1173 as Ainoht (and as Aynat in 1403–04 and Ainedt in 1441). The Slovene name Socka is derived through vowel reduction from *Sǫtěska, literally 'gorge'. The settlement was named for the Socka Gorge on the Hudinja River between Zavrh Hill (907 m) and Kozjek Hill (748 m) north of the settlement. The name of the gorge is also a reduced form derived from the common noun *sǫtěska 'gorge'. The settlement was known as Einödt in German.
