= Črešnjevec, Vojnik =

Črešnjevec
- Location in Slovenia
- Coordinates: 46°18′9.22″N 15°21′22.87″E
- Country: Slovenia
- Traditional region: Styria
- Statistical region: Savinja
- Municipality: Vojnik

Area
  - Total: 0.41 km^{2} (0.16 sq mi)
- Elevation: 371.5 m (1,219 ft)

Population (2002)
  - Total: 16

Črešnjevec (pronounced [ˈtʃɾeːʃnjɛʋəts]) is a small settlement in the Municipality of Vojnik in eastern Slovenia. It lies in the hills east of Vojnik. The area is part of the traditional region of Styria. It is now included with the rest of the municipality in the Savinja Statistical Region.
