= Hudinja (river) =

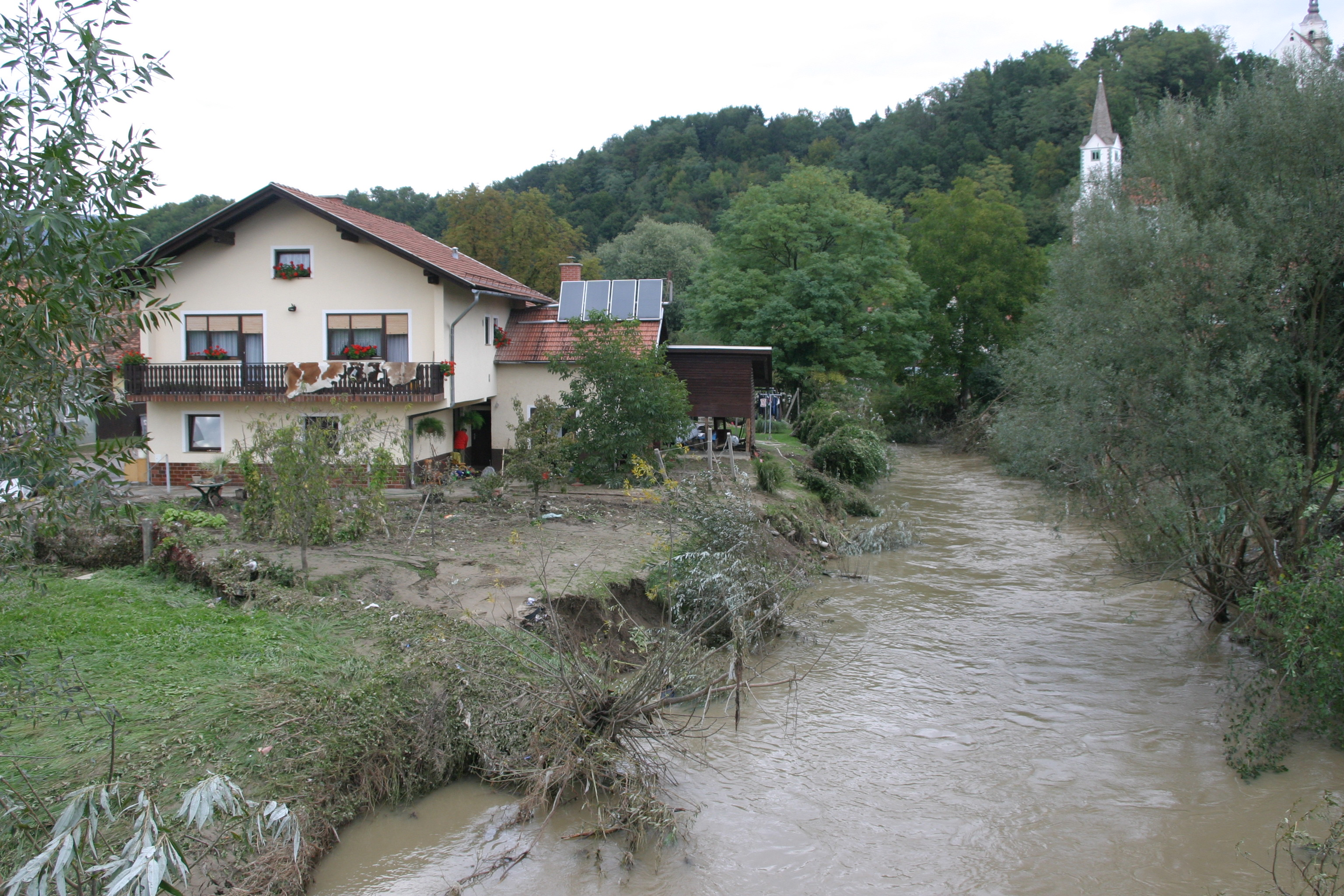
- Hudinja in Vojnik

Location
- Country: Slovenia

Physical characteristics
- Mouth
  - location: Voglajna
  - coordinates: 46.2324°N 15.2775°E
- Length: 32 km (20 mi)
- Basin size: 207 km^{2} (80 sq mi)

Basin features
- Progression: Voglajna→ Savinja→ Sava→ Danube→ Black Sea

The Hudinja (pronounced [xuˈdiːnja]) is a river in Styria, Slovenia. The river is 32 kilometres (20 mi) in length. Its source is on the Pohorje Massif southwest of Mount Rogla, about 1,380 metres (4,530 ft) above sea level, near the source of Dravinja River. The river passes Vitanje, Socka Castle, Vojnik, and Celje, where it flows into the Voglajna. A district of Celje also named Hudinja lies on the river.
