= Nova Cerkev =

Nova Cerkev Strmec (pri Vojniku) (1952–1992)
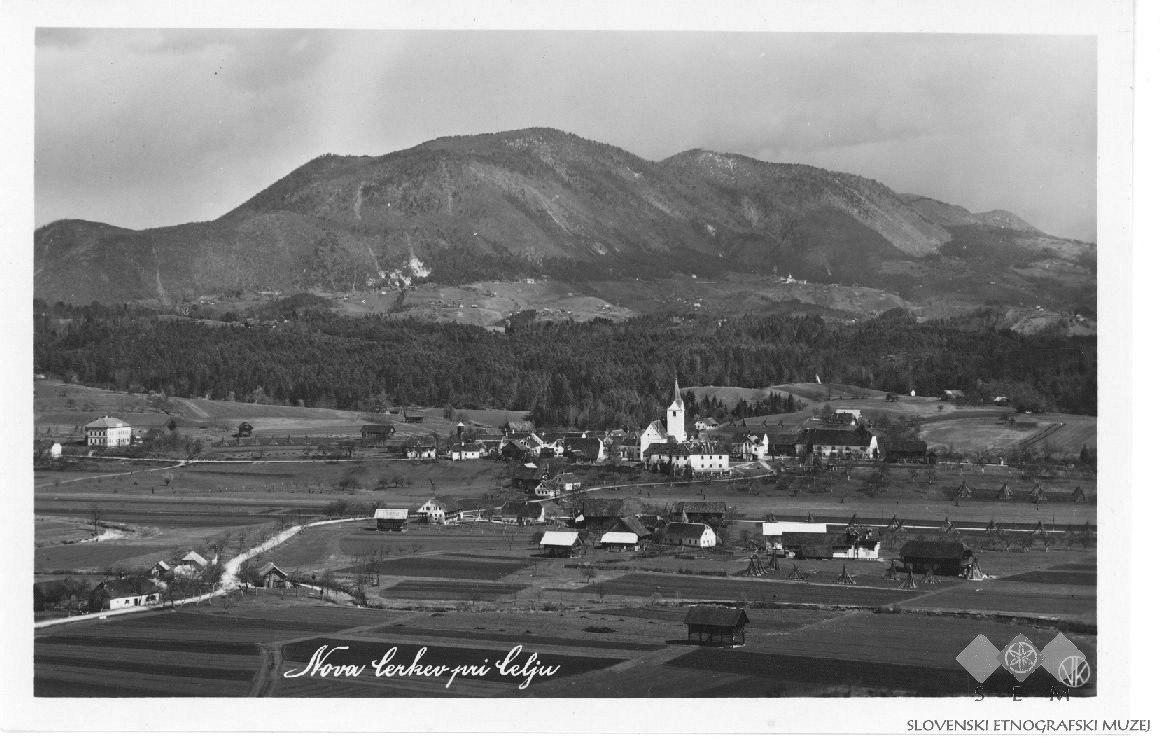
- Postcard of Nova Cerkev

- Location in Slovenia
- Coordinates: 46°18′47.51″N 15°17′10.24″E
- Country: Slovenia
- Traditional region: Styria
- Statistical region: Savinja
- Municipality: Vojnik

Area
  - Total: 1.8 km^{2} (0.69 sq mi)
- Elevation: 303.2 m (995 ft)

Population (2002)
  - Total: 497

Nova Cerkev (pronounced [ˈnɔːʋa ˈtseːrkɛu̯]) is a settlement in the Municipality of Vojnik in eastern Slovenia. It lies on the left bank of the Hudinja River northwest of Vojnik off the main road to Velenje. The area is part of the traditional region of Styria. It is now included with the rest of the municipality in the Savinja Statistical Region.

== Name ==
The name of the settlement was changed from Nova Cerkev (literally, 'new church') to Strmec in 1952. It was further renamed from Strmec to Strmec pri Vojniku in 1953. The name was changed on the basis of the 1948 Law on Names of Settlements and Designations of Squares, Streets, and Buildings as part of efforts by Slovenia's postwar communist government to remove religious elements from toponyms. The name Nova Cerkev was restored in 1992.

== Church ==
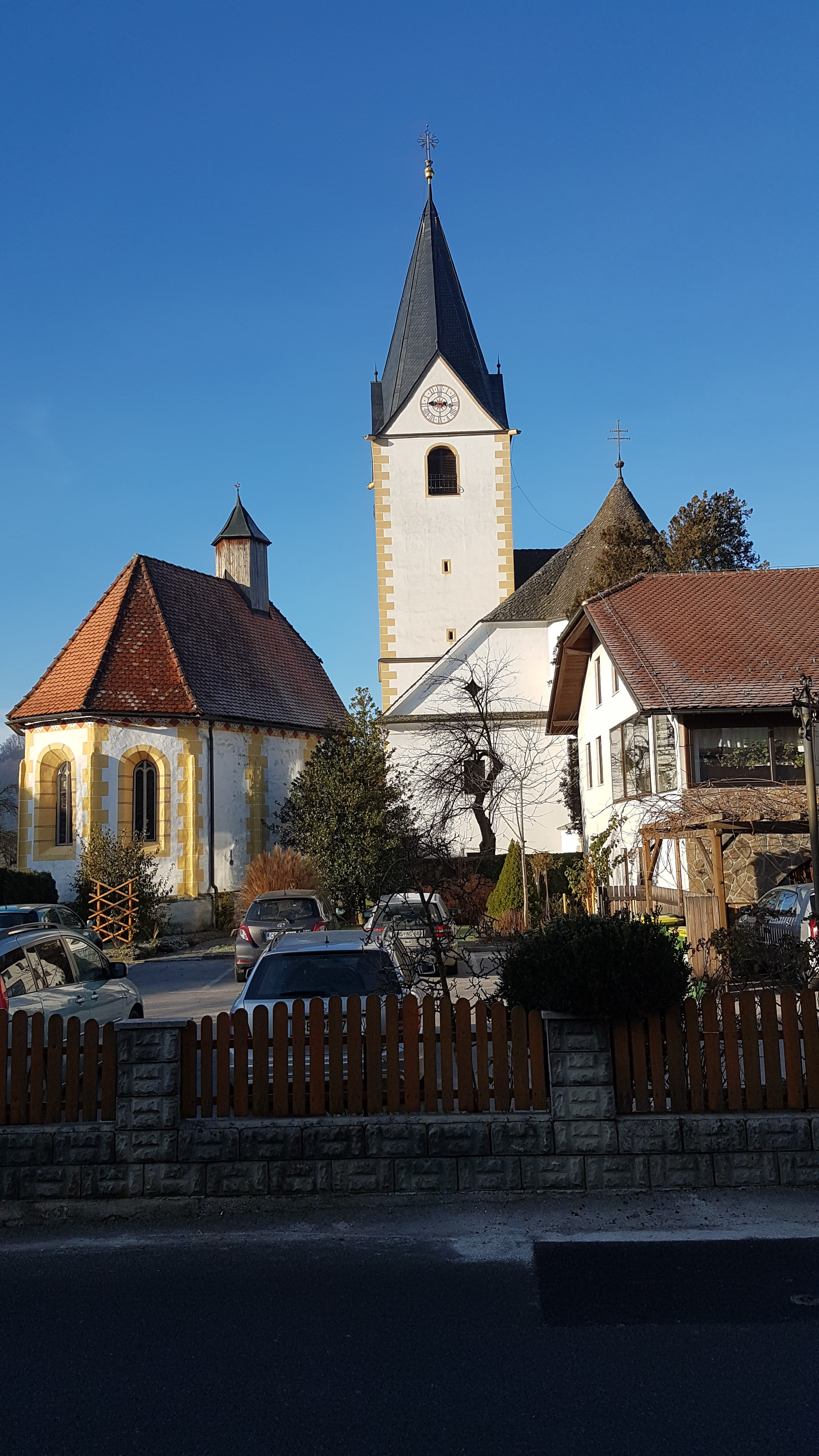
St. Leonard's Church, Nova Cerkev

The local parish church is dedicated to Saint Leonard and belongs to the Roman Catholic Diocese of Celje. It was first mentioned in written documents dating to 1236. The original Romanesque building was extended in the 15th century. In around 1730 two Baroque chapels were added.
