= Frankolovo =

Frankolovo Loka ob Tesnici (until 1955)
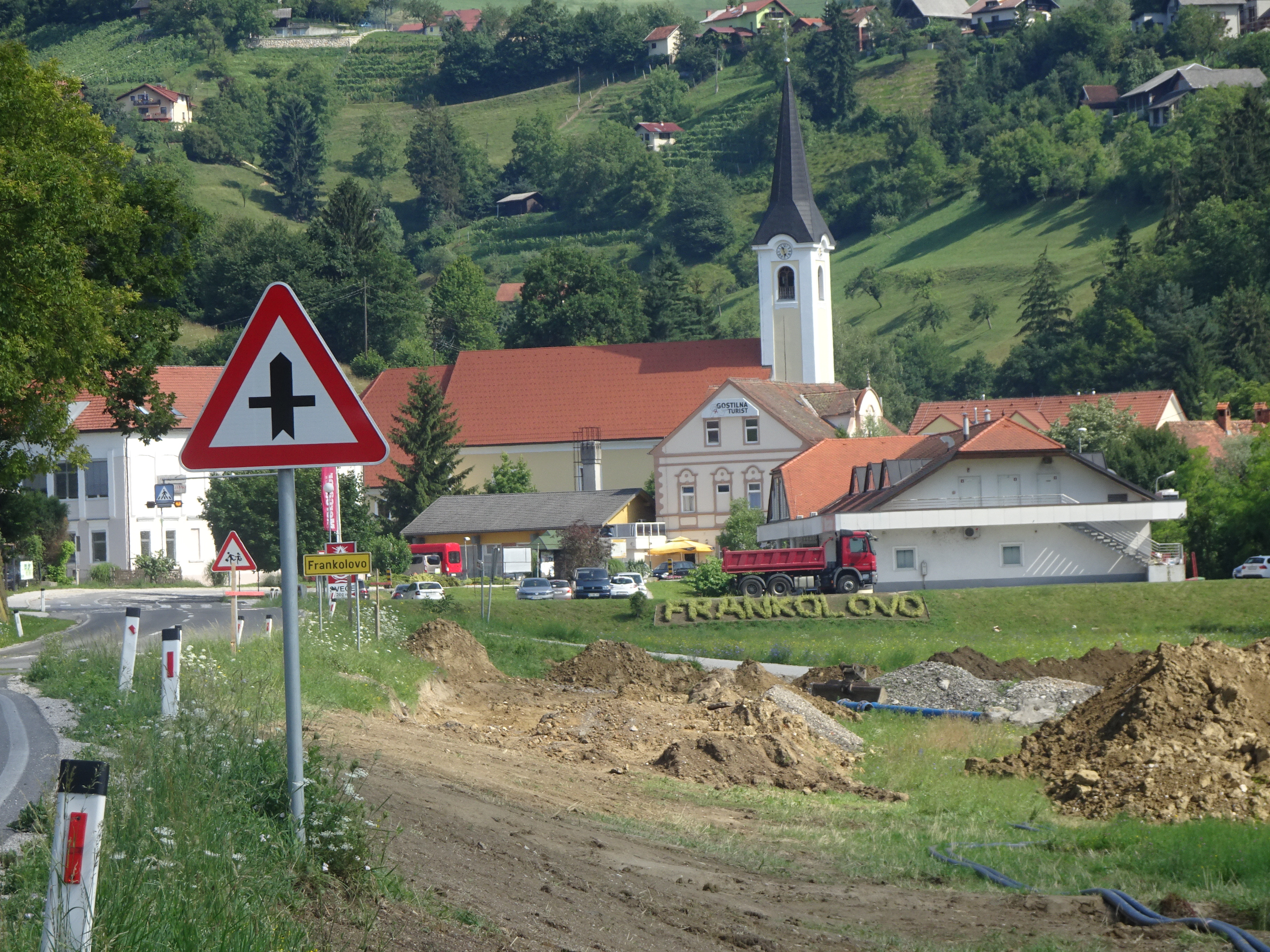

- Location in Slovenia
- Coordinates: 46°19′20.53″N 15°19′15.24″E
- Country: Slovenia
- Traditional region: Styria
- Statistical region: Savinja
- Municipality: Vojnik

Area
  - Total: 1.25 km^{2} (0.48 sq mi)
- Elevation: 371.7 m (1,219 ft)

Population (2002)
  - Total: 281

Frankolovo (pronounced [fɾaŋˈkoːlɔʋɔ]) is a settlement in the Municipality of Vojnik in eastern Slovenia. It lies on the main road north of Vojnik towards Slovenske Konjice. The area is part of the traditional region of Styria. It is now included with the rest of the municipality in the Savinja Statistical Region.

== Name ==
The older name of the settlement was attested in written sources in 1403–04 as in der Lak (and as in Lokch in 1415–23 and zu Lakg in 1464). The name of the settlement was changed from Loka ob Tesnici to Frankolovo in 1955. The name Frankolovo was variously attested in 1763–87 as Frankole, Francole, and Franole. It is derived from Frank, the name of a district head mentioned in a 1718 rent-roll, and is probably of secondary derivation, ultimately based on a name such as *Frankova vas 'Frank's village'.

== History ==
On February 12, 1945, members of Wehrmacht killed one hundred Slovene civilians at an event called "the Frankolovo crime".

== Church ==
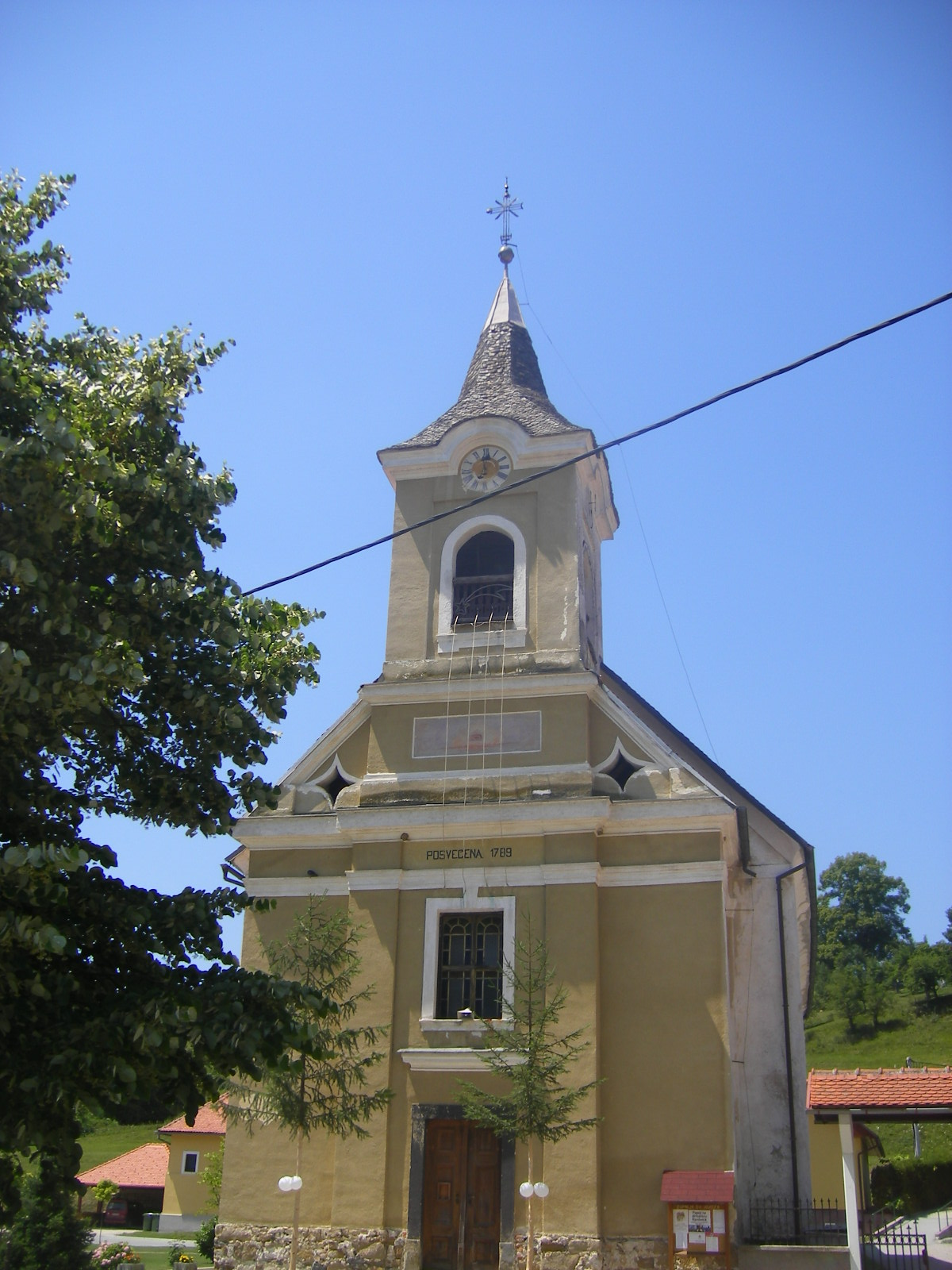
Saint Joseph's Church.

The parish church in the village is dedicated to Saint Joseph and belongs to the Roman Catholic Diocese of Celje. It was built between 1787 and 1789 and refurbished in 1822.
