= Slovenske Konjice =

Slovenske Konjice Konjice (until 1934)
- Town
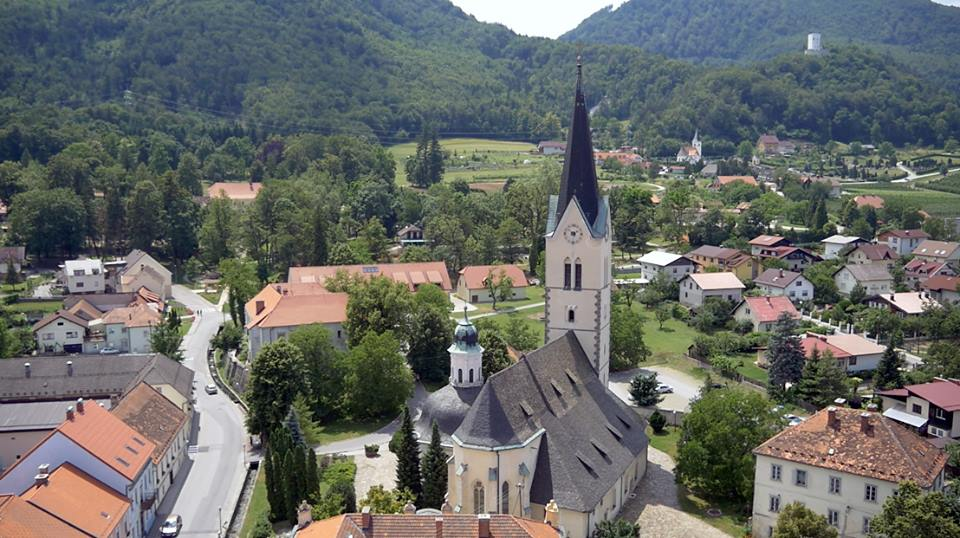
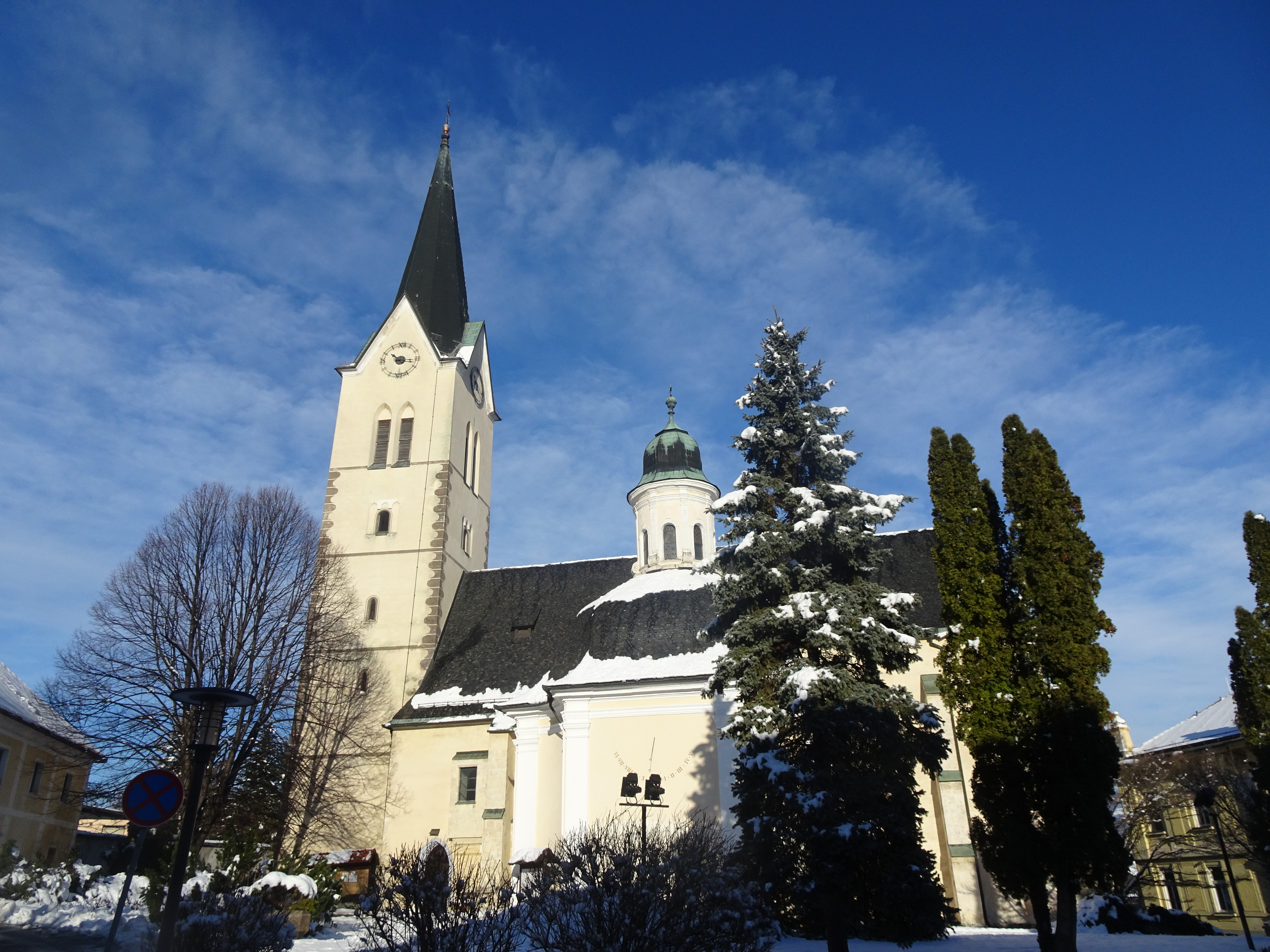
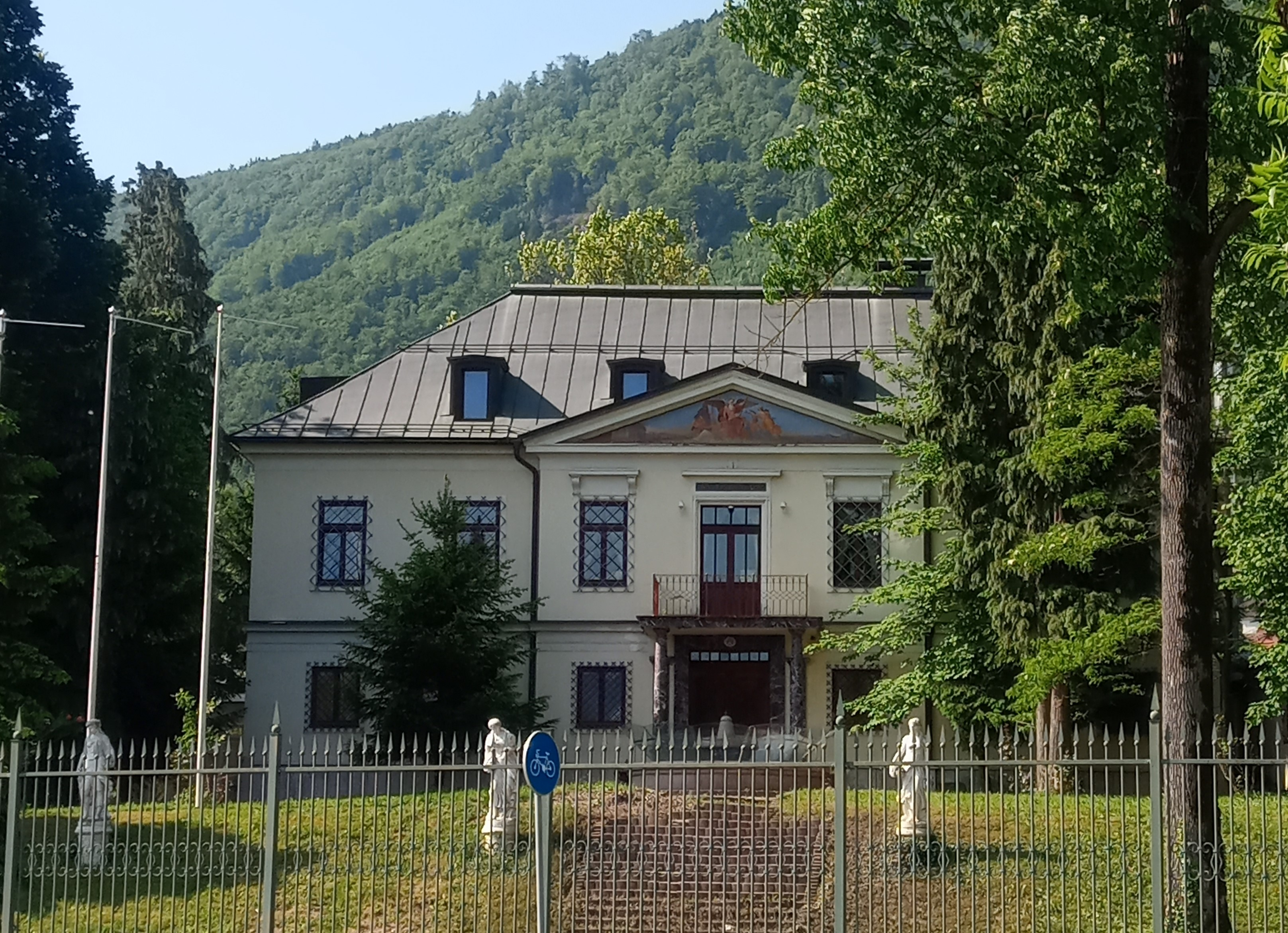
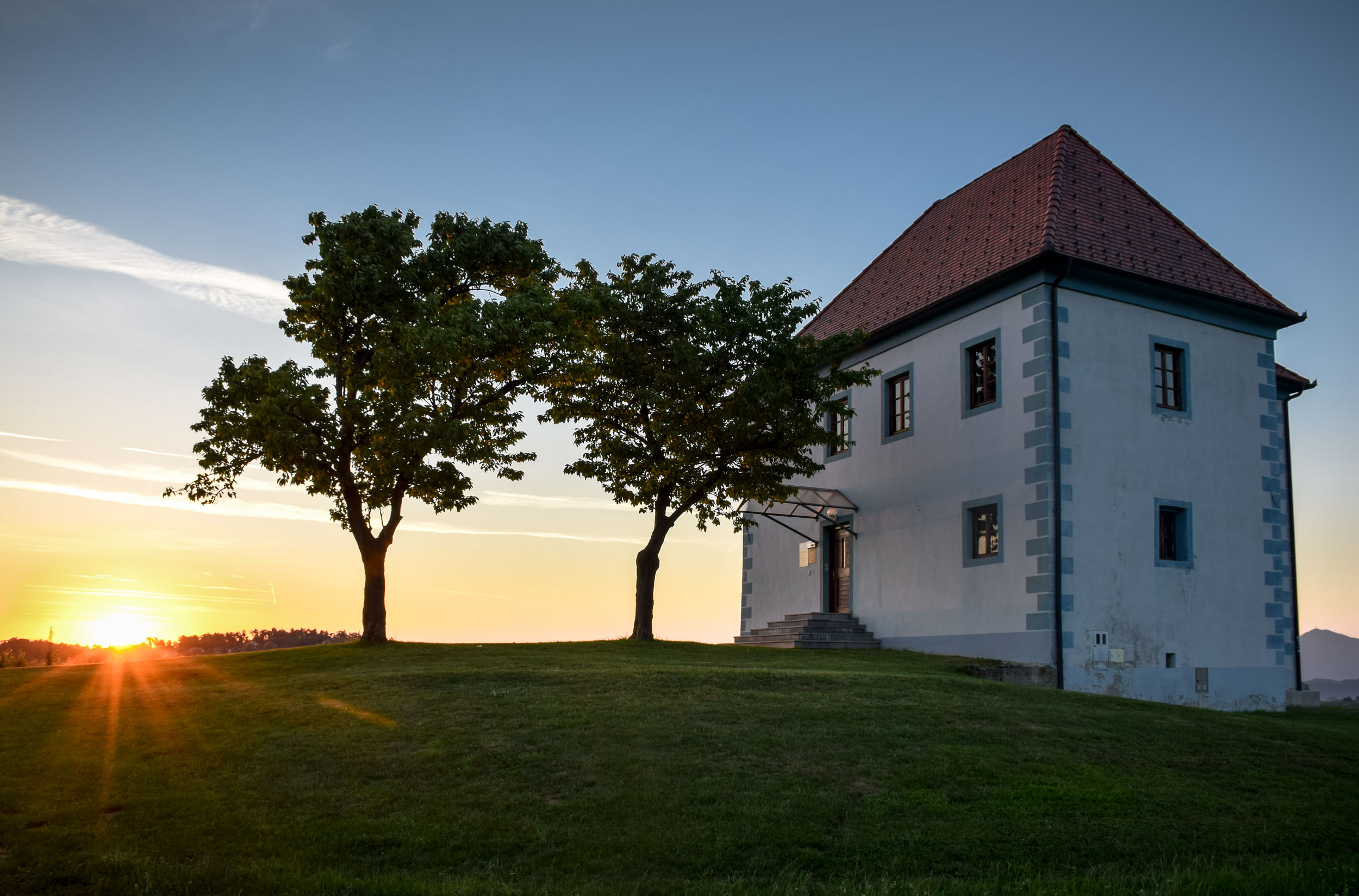
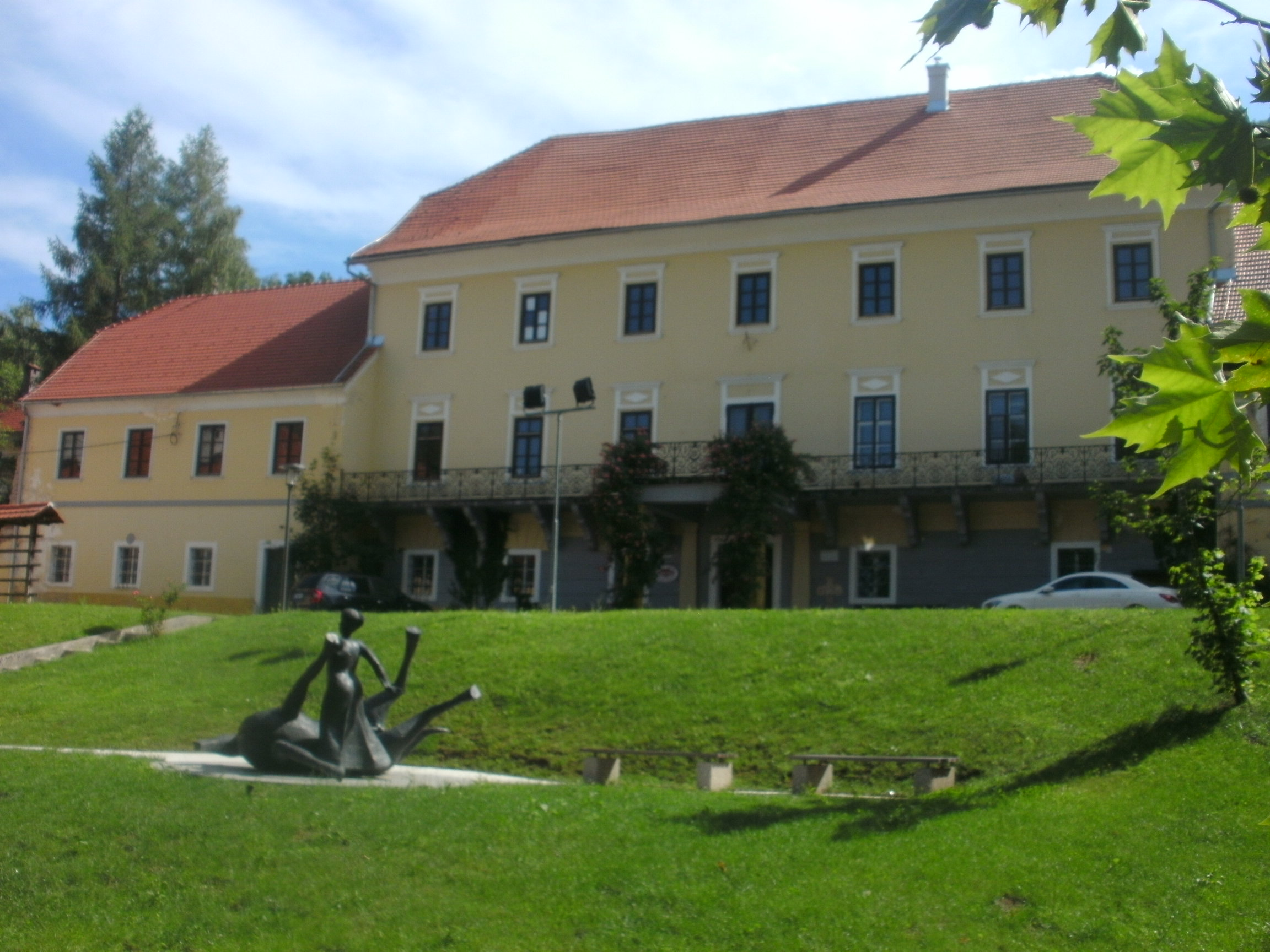
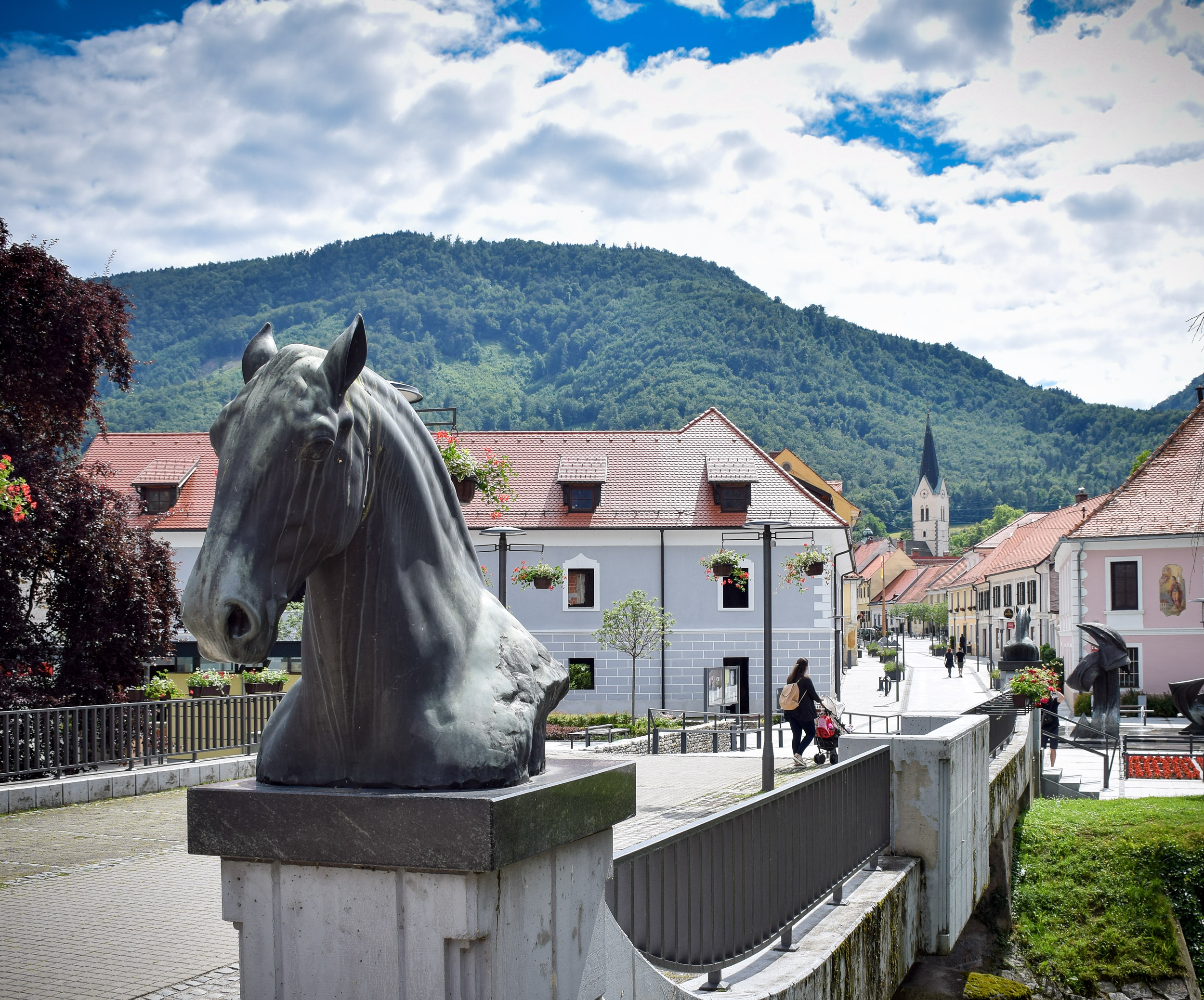

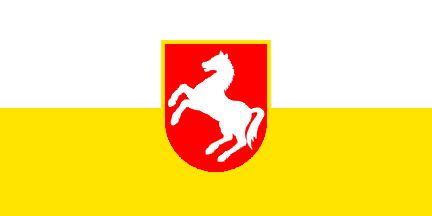
- Flag Coat of arms

- Location in Slovenia
- Coordinates: 46°20′18″N 15°25′24″E
- Country: Slovenia
- Traditional region: Styria
- Statistical region: Savinja
- Municipality: Slovenske Konjice

Area
  - Total: 2.75 km^{2} (1.06 sq mi)
- Elevation: 322.0 m (1,056.4 ft)

Population (2023)
  - Total: 5,152
- Vehicle registration: CE

Slovenske Konjice (pronounced [slɔˈʋèːnskɛ kɔˈnjìːtsɛ]; German: Gonobitz, in older sources also Gannobitz; locally Konjice or Kujince) is a town in northeastern Slovenia. It is the seat of the Municipality of Slovenske Konjice. The area is part of the traditional region of Styria.

== History and town sights ==
The town of Slovenske Konjice lies below the northern slopes of Mount Konjice (Slovene: Konjiška Gora) and the winegrowing Škalce Hills. On a hill above the town to the southwest are the ruins of 12th-century Gonobitz Castle (Slovene: Grad Konjice, German: Burg Gonobitz), which has later additions and was abandoned in the 18th century. Its ruins have been partially restored.

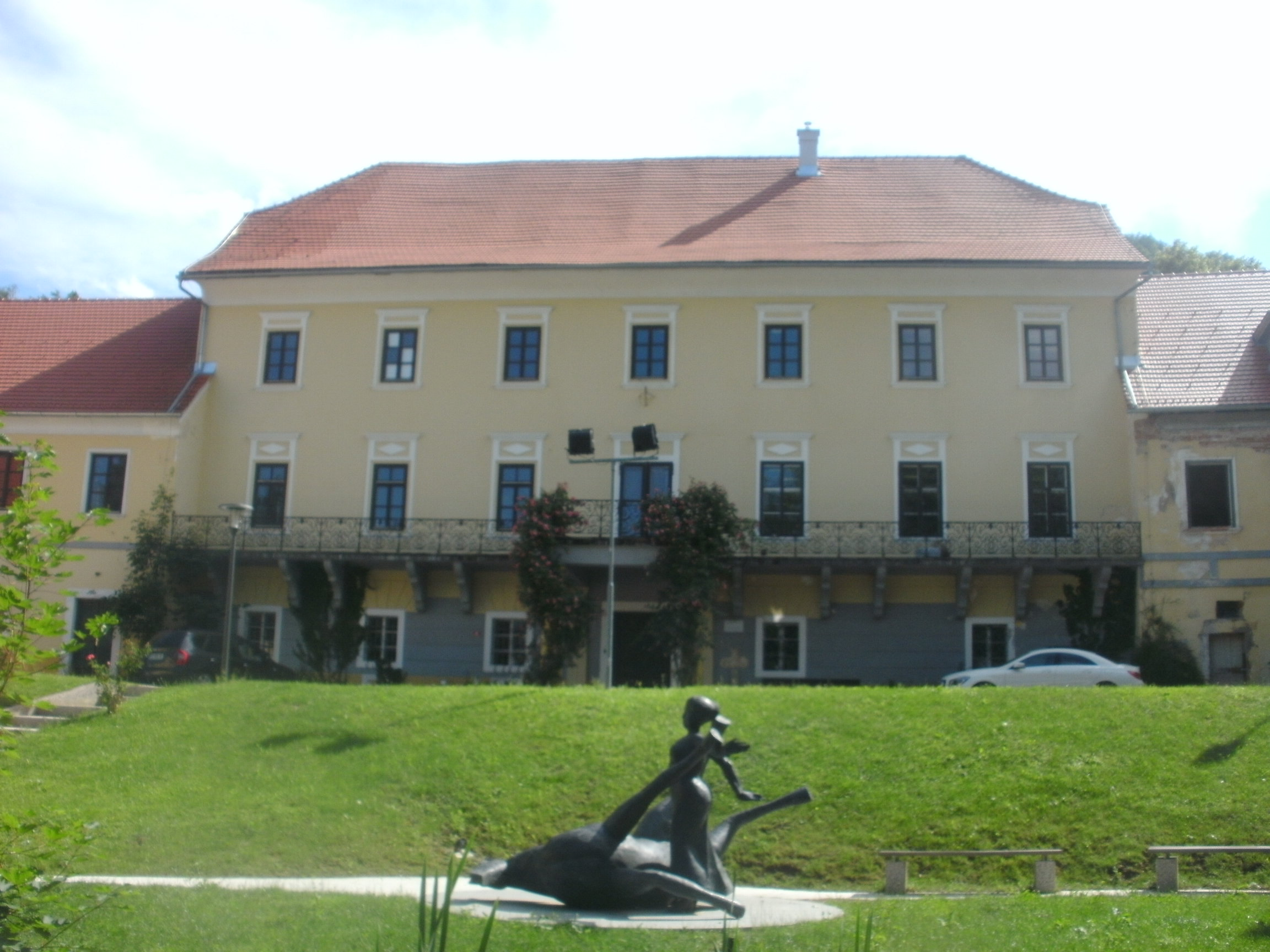
Trebnik Mansion

Above Old Square (Slovene: Stari trg) stands the medieval Trebnik Mansion. The more than 860-year-old dense town line is a sloping square, from Trebnik Mansion past St. George's parish church, along a small stream in an open channel, down to the Dravinja River. The new Town Square (Mestni trg) is on the other bank of the river, connected with Old Square by a bridge with four horse heads on the corners.

The dominant structure in the upper part of the town's medieval core is the parish church dedicated to Saint George and belonging to the Roman Catholic Archdiocese of Maribor, dating back to the late 13th century with 18th-century additions (a Baroque side chapel). The veneration of the saint at this place goes even further back in history. The town was mentioned in written sources dating to 1165 as a seminal parish. The castle was first mentioned in 1148 and the market town in 1236. The town itself was not surrounded by walls. At the time of the Ottoman raids, the church with its vicarage served as a fortified refuge. A second church in the settlement is dedicated to Saint Anne. It dates to the mid-16th century with a 17th-century belfry and Baroque additions.

The main street and the transversal connections above the Dravinja are lined with longitudinal or transversally positioned one-storey houses with well-preserved Gothic cores and Renaissance additions. The façades were restyled in the 19th century (Biedermeier, Historicism). A rarity is the Art Nouveau building of the former savings bank. A Marian column dating to the mid-18th century and a column shrine dedicated to Saint Florian above the stream (both designed by the local artist Franc Zamlik in 1750) dominate the open square. The town core is well preserved.

Historical population
Year	Pop.	±%
1948	1,191	—
1953	1,493	+25.4%
1961	1,845	+23.6%
1971	2,679	+45.2%
1981	4,273	+59.5%
1991	4,888	+14.4%
2002	4,866	−0.5%
2011	4,869	+0.1%
2021	5,155	+5.9%
Population size may be affected by changes in administrative divisions.

Slovenske Konjice played a role during the Slovenian peasant revolt of 1515, with rebels here composing a letter with their demands to send to the emperor in Vienna. Economic development was boosted after construction of main Vienna to Trieste road in the 18th century. During the 19th century the town got a local court. The Austrian Southern Railway was built in 1846, but it ran 15 km (9 mi) east of Konjice. On 20 June 1892, work started on a narrow gauge (760 mm) steam railroad line called Konjičanka from Poljčane to Slovenske Konjice, which was opened on 20 December 1892. On 29 June 1921 it was extended to Zreče. It was closed in 1963, and the tracks were removed in 1970. A museum locomotive K.3 (Gonobitz), built by the Krauss factory at Linz and used on this line, is on display at the Slovenian Railway Museum in Ljubljana.

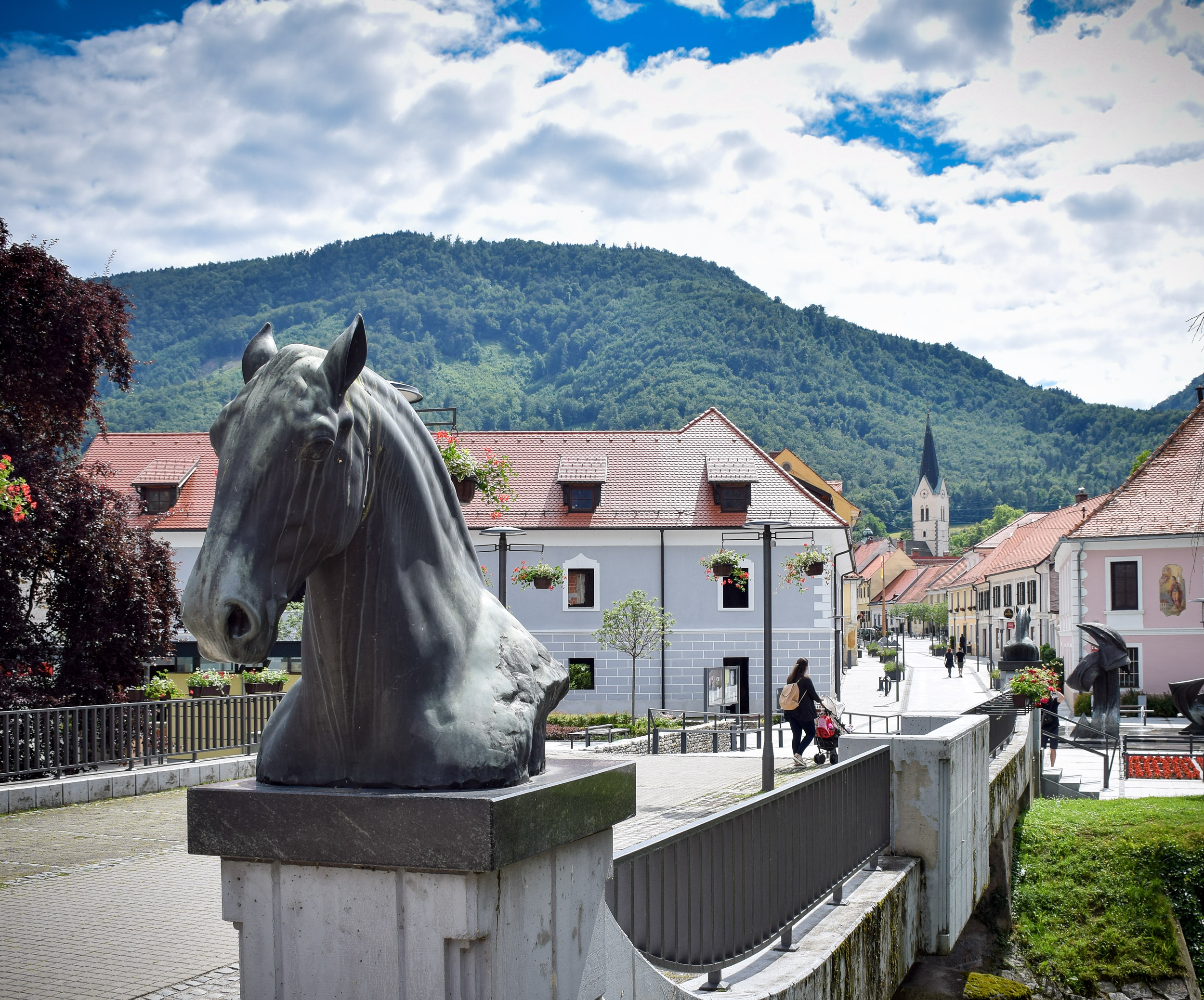
From Mestni trg (Town Square) towards Stari trg (Old Square)

In 2022, torrential rains caused basements to flood in Slovenske Konjice.

=== Name ===
Over the centuries, the name Konjice appears in written documents in various forms: Gonviz (1251), Gombicz (1370), Gannabitz (1570), Gonaviz (1594), Gonavitz (1630), Gonwitz (1636), Gonowitz (1662), Ganowiz (1680), Gonnawitz (1680), and modern German Gonobitz. The adjective Slovenske was added to the Slovene name Konjice in 1934, under the Kingdom of Yugoslavia, in order to distinguish it from the town of Konjic in Bosnia and Herzegovina.

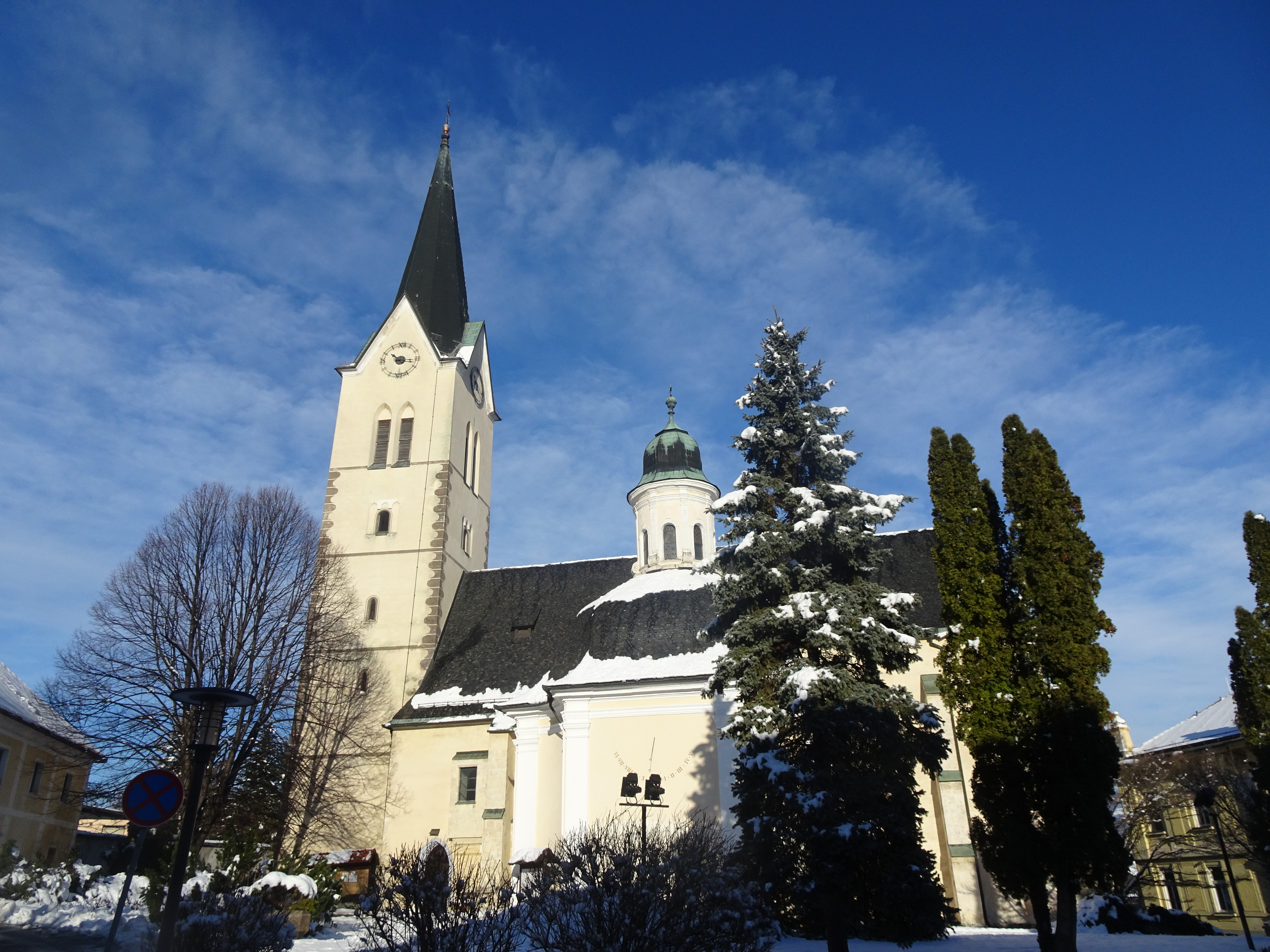
Saint George's parish church

== Monuments ==
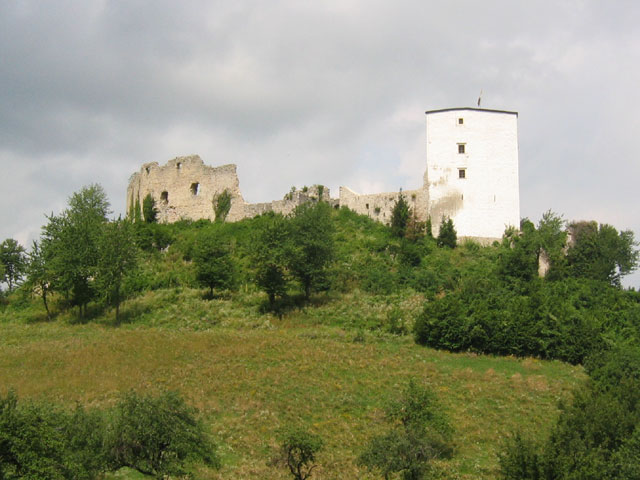
Konjice Castle

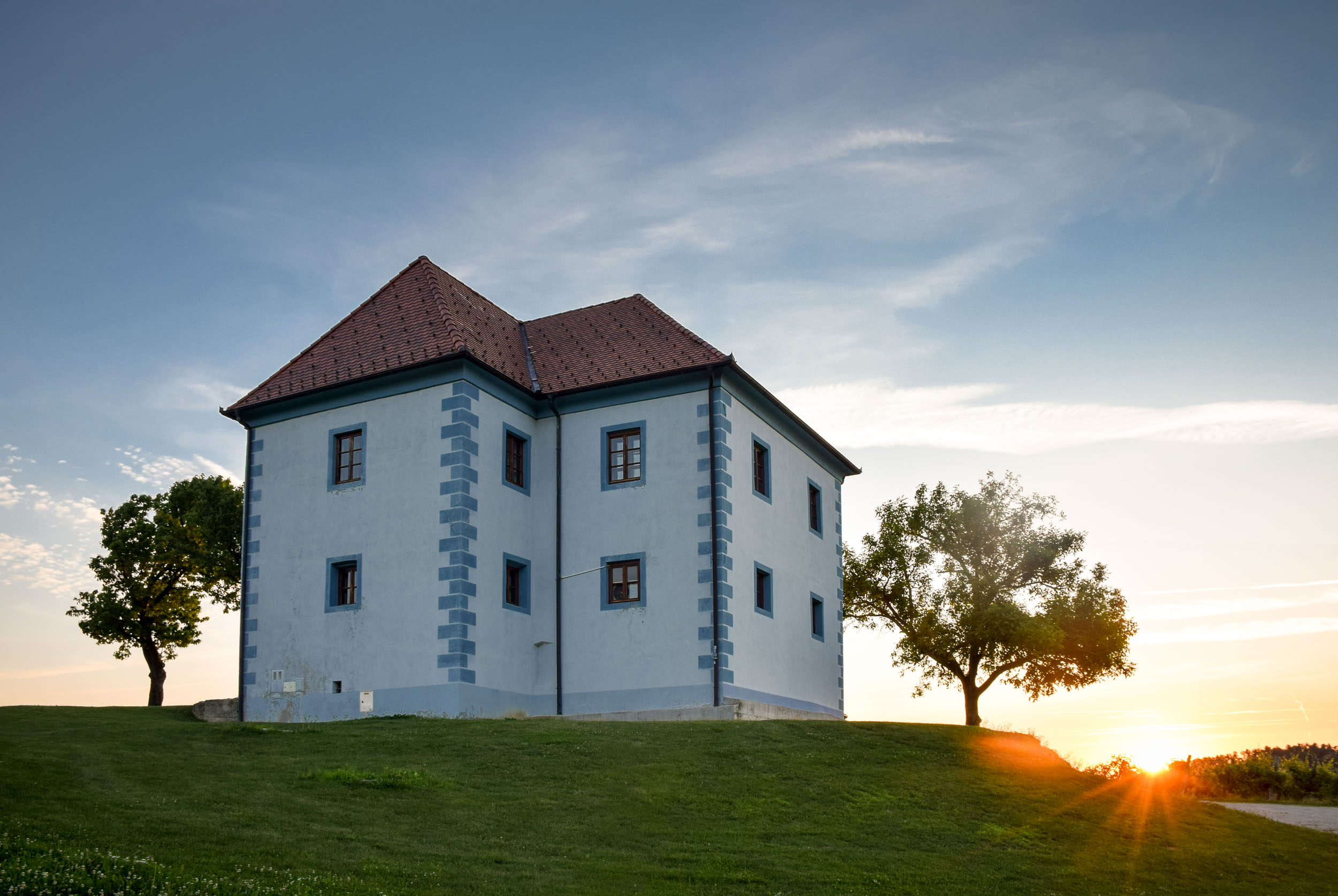
Vineyard Mansion at Škalce

- Konjice Castle
- Trebnik Mansion
- Vineyard Mansion at Škalce
- St. George parish church
- St. Anna Cemetery church
- Žiče Charterhouse

=== Owners of the castle ===
- house of Gonobitz 1148–1329
- house of Wilthausen 1329–1385
- house of Duino 1385–1406
- lords of Walsee 1406–1469
- regional princes 1496–1576
- Johann von Khißl 1576–1592
- Archduke Ferdinand 1594–1597
- counts Tattenbach 1597–1670
- Holy Roman Emperor 1670–1685
- Johann and Otto Tattenbach 1685–1692
- Žiče Charterhouse 1692–1783
- Imperial Religious Fund (Religionsfond) 1783–1828
- princes of Windisch-Grätz 1828–1945

== Geography ==
=== Climate ===
Climate data for Slovenske Konjice, 1991–2020 normals, extremes 1951–2020
Month	Jan	Feb	Mar	Apr	May	Jun	Jul	Aug	Sep	Oct	Nov	Dec	Year
Record high °C (°F)	20.6 (69.1)	21.8 (71.2)	25 (77)	27.6 (81.7)	31.8 (89.2)	34.3 (93.7)	36.2 (97.2)	38.5 (101.3)	31.5 (88.7)	27.1 (80.8)	23.1 (73.6)	18.1 (64.6)	38.5 (101.3)
Mean daily maximum °C (°F)	4.7 (40.5)	7.0 (44.6)	11.6 (52.9)	16.6 (61.9)	21.0 (69.8)	24.7 (76.5)	26.5 (79.7)	26.2 (79.2)	21.1 (70.0)	16.0 (60.8)	9.9 (49.8)	5.1 (41.2)	15.9 (60.6)
Daily mean °C (°F)	0.6 (33.1)	1.9 (35.4)	5.8 (42.4)	10.6 (51.1)	15.2 (59.4)	19.1 (66.4)	20.6 (69.1)	20.0 (68.0)	15.2 (59.4)	10.7 (51.3)	5.9 (42.6)	1.3 (34.3)	10.6 (51.0)
Mean daily minimum °C (°F)	−3 (27)	−2.3 (27.9)	1.1 (34.0)	5.1 (41.2)	9.5 (49.1)	13.4 (56.1)	14.8 (58.6)	14.5 (58.1)	10.5 (50.9)	6.6 (43.9)	2.6 (36.7)	−2.1 (28.2)	5.9 (42.6)
Record low °C (°F)	−22.7 (−8.9)	−21.8 (−7.2)	−20.4 (−4.7)	−5.9 (21.4)	−2.5 (27.5)	1.1 (34.0)	3.2 (37.8)	5.2 (41.4)	0.1 (32.2)	−8 (18)	−15 (5)	−20.7 (−5.3)	−22.7 (−8.9)
Average precipitation mm (inches)	41 (1.6)	50 (2.0)	53 (2.1)	67 (2.6)	91 (3.6)	106 (4.2)	104 (4.1)	112 (4.4)	121 (4.8)	100 (3.9)	86 (3.4)	64 (2.5)	995 (39.2)
Average snowfall cm (inches)	16 (6.3)	21 (8.3)	7 (2.8)	0.5 (0.2)	0 (0)	0 (0)	0 (0)	0 (0)	0 (0)	0.5 (0.2)	7 (2.8)	17 (6.7)	69 (27.3)
Average extreme snow depth cm (inches)	4 (1.6)	4 (1.6)	1 (0.4)	0 (0)	0 (0)	0 (0)	0 (0)	0 (0)	0 (0)	0 (0)	1 (0.4)	3 (1.2)	4 (1.6)
Average precipitation days (≥ 0.1 mm)	9	8	10	13	14	14	13	12	12	11	12	11	139
Average snowy days (≥ 1 cm)	4	3	1	0.2	0	0	0	0	0	0.1	1	3	12.3
Source: Slovenian Environment Agency (ARSO)

== Tourism ==
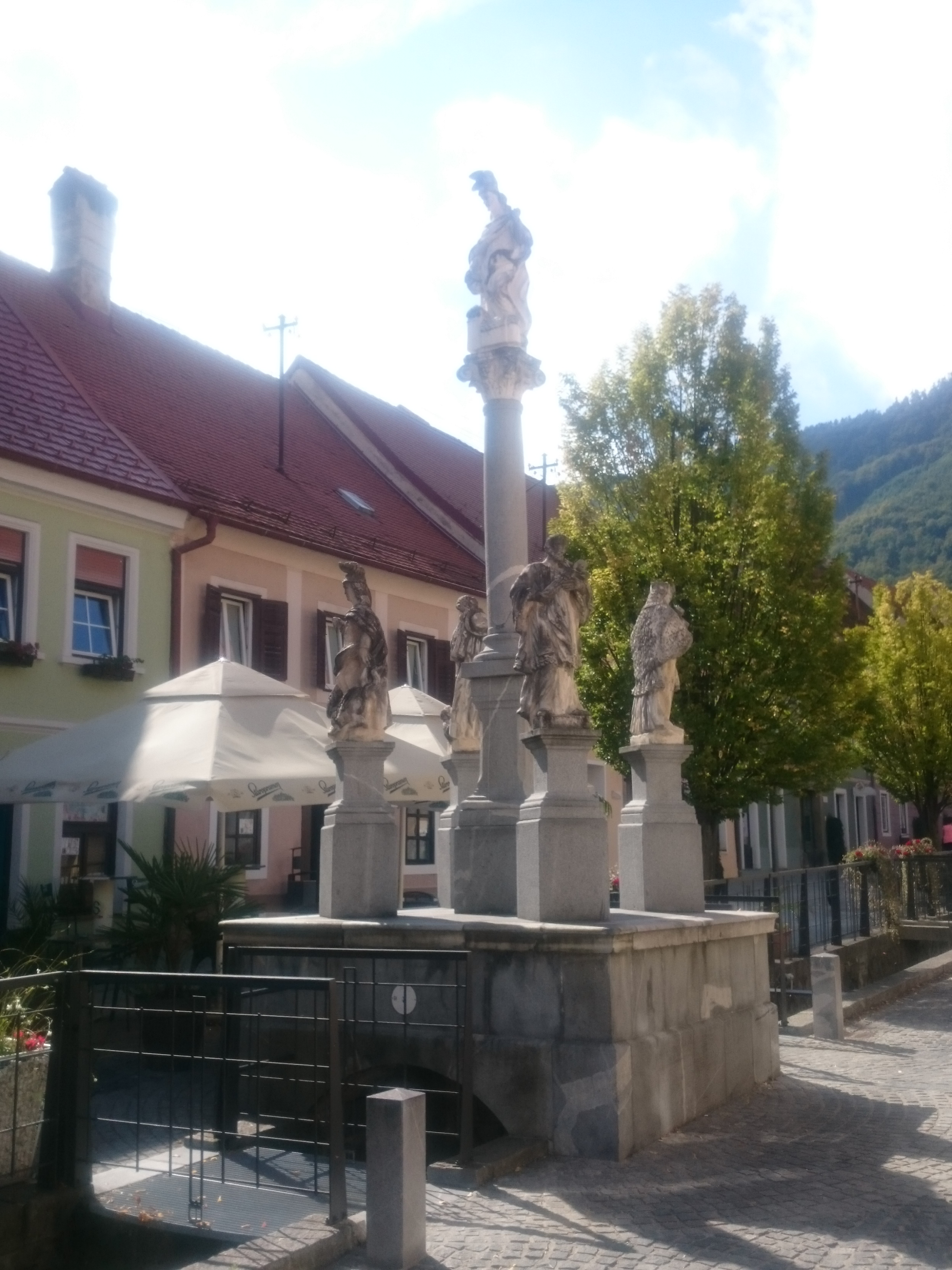
St. Florian column

- Slovenske Konjice, formerly nicknamed "The Town of Wine and Flowers", won the Pan-European Entente Florale Gold Medal Award in 1998 and 2014.
- The traditional St. George festival (Jurjevanje) ranks Slovenske Konjice among Europe's Carnival Cities.

The town has been rewarded for its efforts with the national "Most Beautiful Excursion Destination" award by the Tourist Association of Slovenia for many consecutive years.

== Culture ==
The town of Slovenske Konjice hosted an international festival of underwater film and photography named "Sprehodi pod morjem" (Walking beneath the Sea).

== Sport ==
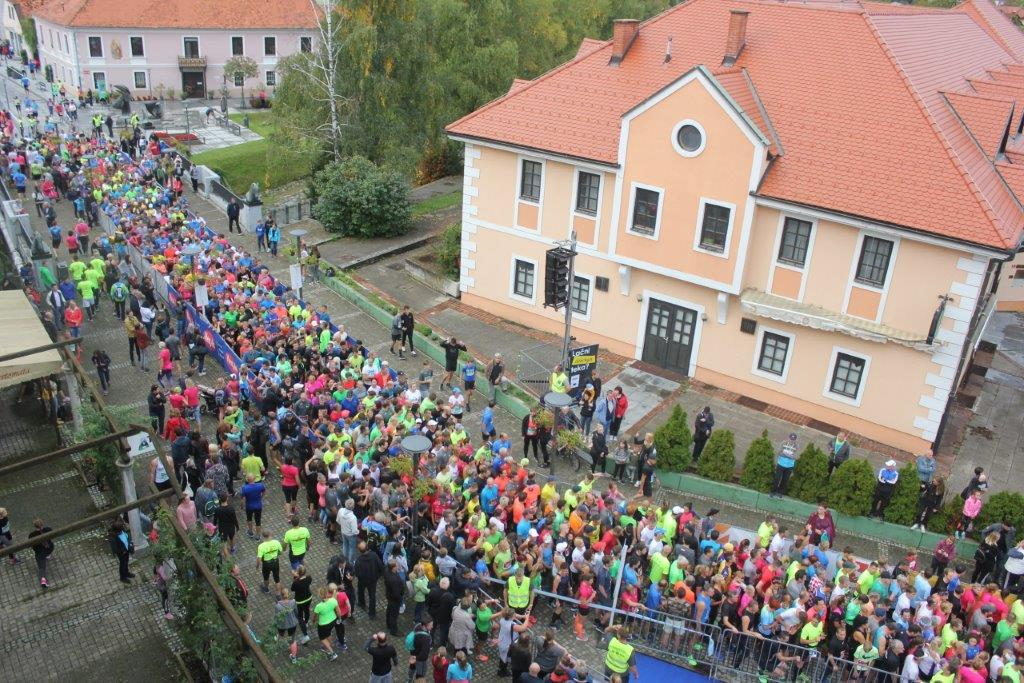
Konjice Marathon

- ND Dravinja Football club

=== Sport events ===
- Konjice (mini) Marathon (Konjiški maraton)

== Notable people ==
Notable people that were born or lived in Slovenske Konjice include:

- Konrad von Hebenstreit (died 1412), archbishop of Freising
- Ivan Minatti (1924–2012), Slovene poet
- Branko Rudolf (1904–1987), Slovene writer
- Ajša Sivka (born 2005), WNBA player
- Adelma Vay (1840–1925), writer, medium, and pioneer of Spiritualism
- Jure Zdovc (born 1966), Slovene basketball player and coach
- Tamara Zidanšek (born 1997), Slovene tennis player

== Twin towns – sister cities ==
Slovenske Konjice is twinned with:

Hlohovec, Slovakia (since 2007); Sollefteå, Sweden (since 2008); Kosjerić, Serbia (since 2009); Hranice (Přerov District), Czech Republic (since 2012); Gornja Stubica, Croatia (since 2013); Zvyozdny gorodok, Russia (since 2015); Tolfa, Italy (since 2016); Križevci, Croatia (since 2016); Szazhalombatta, Hungary (since 2016); Biograd na Moru, Croatia (since 2019)

=== International projects and other forms of cooperation ===
Konjic, Bosnia and Herzegovina; Globasnitz, Austria; Sveti Petar Orehovec, Croatia; Novska, Croatia
