= Vojnik, Vojnik =

Vojnik
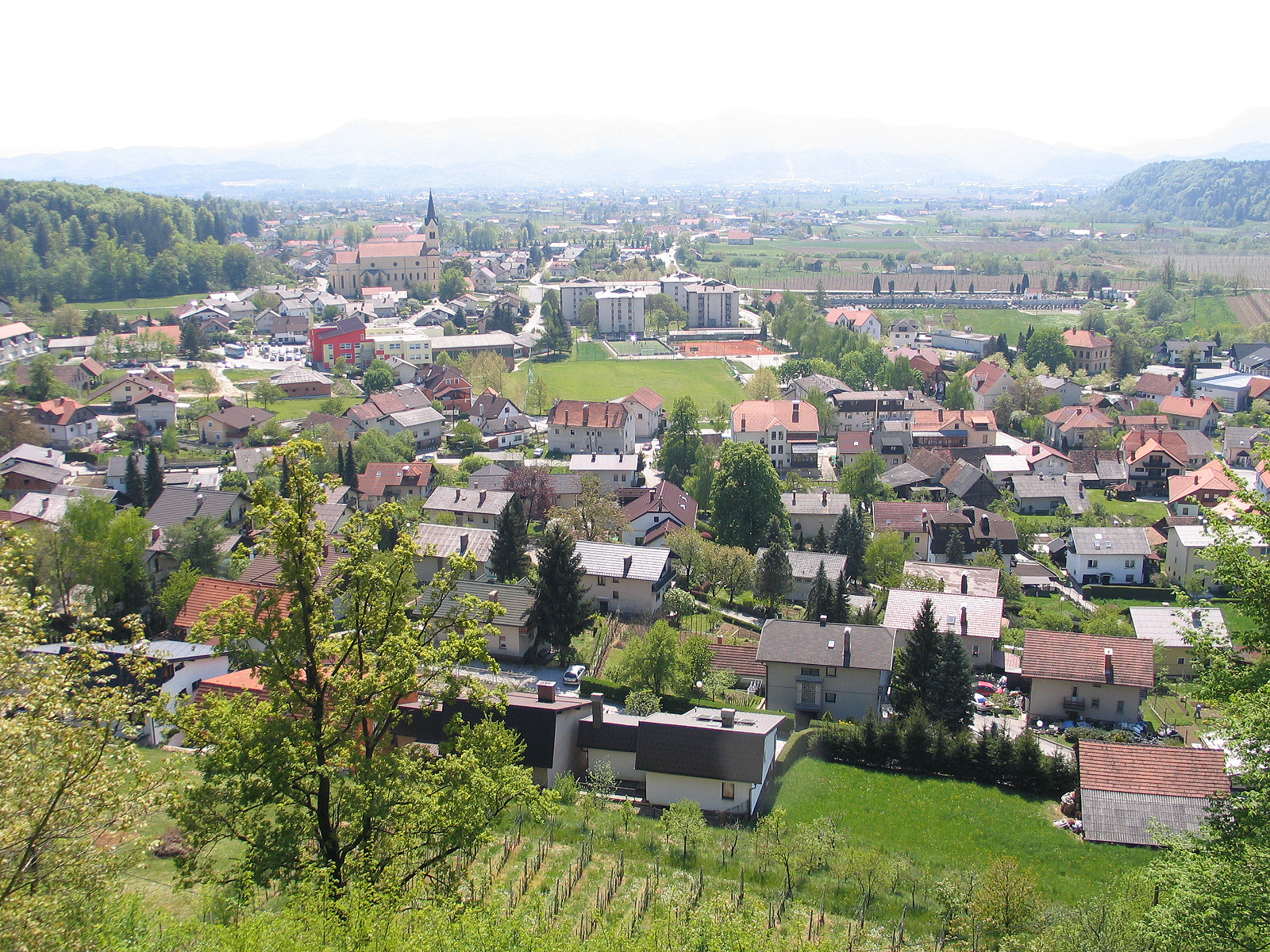
- Vojnik, a view towards the south. The city in the background is Celje.

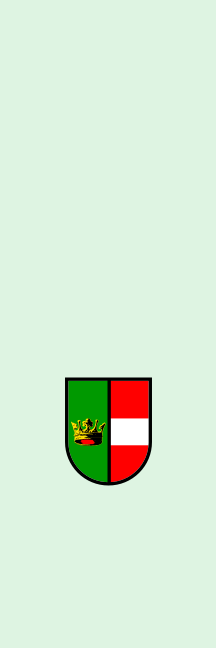
- Flag

- Location in Slovenia
- Coordinates: 46°17′35.75″N 15°18′18.55″E
- Country: Slovenia
- Traditional region: Styria
- Statistical region: Savinja
- Municipality: Vojnik

Area
  - Total: 5.0 km^{2} (1.9 sq mi)
- Elevation: 286.1 m (939 ft)

Population (2012)
  - Total: 2,290

Vojnik (pronounced [ˈʋoːi̯nik]; German: Hochenegg) is the largest settlement and the centre of the Municipality of Vojnik in eastern Slovenia. It lies on the Hudinja River, north of Celje. The area is part of the traditional region of Lower Styria. The municipality is now included in the Savinja Statistical Region.

Locals make their living from farming, but there are also many small businesses. Vojnik was first mentioned as a borough in 1306. There were many fires in the town, and the town even burned to the ground in 1839.

== Name ==
Vojnik was first attested in written sources in 1165 as de Hoheneke (and as Hohnec in 1173, Hohenekke circa 1175, and Hohenek in 1199). The medieval German forms of the name (literally, 'high hill') are the result of folk etymology. The name is derived from *Xvojьnikъ, from Slavic *xvoja 'fir, spruce'. Accentual evidence makes the name's derivation from *vojьnikъ 'soldier' unlikely. In the past, the standard German name of the town was Hochenegg.

== History ==
In 2022, torrential rains caused a basement in Vojnik to flood, which firefighters responded to.

== Churches ==
The parish church in the settlement is dedicated to Saint Bartholomew (Slovene: sveti Jernej) and belongs to the Roman Catholic Diocese of Celje. It is a Neo-Romanesque building dating to 1899. A second church in the settlement is dedicated to Saint Florian. It dates to the mid-15th century and has a Gothic sanctuary with a 17th-century nave.

== Mass graves ==
Vojnik is the site of three known mass graves from the period immediately after the Second World War. The Višnja Vas 1 Mass Grave (Slovene: Grobišče Višnja vas 1), also known as the Hmezad Mass Grave (Grobišče Hmezad), is located north of the settlement, north of the building at Vojnik no. 2, at a new construction site that was the location of a former wooden shed for the Hmezad company. The grave contains the remains of about 100 Croatian soldiers and civilians that were murdered in May 1945 while fleeing towards Dobrna. The Višnja Vas 2 Mass Grave (Grobišče Višnja vas 2) is located north of the settlement, on the right side of the road from Celje to Slovenske Konjice, 270 meters (890 ft) south of the building at Vojnik no. 2 and 230 meters (750 ft) north of the house at Vojnik no. 5. It contains the remains of Croatian civilians that were murdered in May 1945 while fleeing towards Dobrna. The Vojnik Mass Grave (Grobišče Vojnik) lies west of the settlement, in the parking lot in front of the cemetery and below the funeral chapel. It contains the remains of 100 to 200 Croatian civilians and soldiers that were murdered in May 1945.

== Notable people ==
Notable people that were born or lived in Vojnik include:

- Anton Brezovnik (1853–1923), pedagogue, journalist, and political activist
- Doroteja Hauser (1877–1946), painter
- Karel Henn (1809–1877), founder of a Slovenian spa and promoter of the still mineral water pump
- Anton Novačan (1887–1951), author, politician, and diplomat
- Anton Martin Slomšek (1800–1862), Roman Catholic bishop and orator
