= Bukovlje =

Bukovlje may refer to:

- Bukovlje, Croatia, a village and a municipality in Brod-Posavina County, eastern Croatia
- Bukovlje, Kakanj, a village in east-central Bosnia and Herzegovina
- Bukovlje, Konjic, a village in south-central Bosnia and Herzegovina
- Bukovlje, Velika Kladuša, a village in western Bosnia and Herzegovina
- Bukovlje, Zreče, a village in northeastern Slovenia

== See also ==
- Bukovje (disambiguation)
