= Resnik, Zreče =

Resnik
- Location in Slovenia
- Coordinates: 46°26′11.77″N 15°21′40.55″E
- Country: Slovenia
- Traditional region: Styria
- Statistical region: Savinja
- Municipality: Zreče

Area
  - Total: 6.48 km^{2} (2.50 sq mi)
- Elevation: 1,001.6 m (3,286 ft)

Population (2002)
  - Total: 130
- Climate: Dfb

Resnik (pronounced [ˈɾeːsnik]) is a settlement in the Pohorje Hills north of Zreče in northeastern Slovenia. The area is part of the traditional region of Styria. It is now included with the rest of the Municipality of Zreče in the Savinja Statistical Region.

The local church is dedicated to Saint James (Slovene: sveti Jakob) and belongs to the Parish of Sveta Kunigunda na Pohorju. It was built in the late 15th to early 16th centuries, but extensively remodelled in the 18th century.
