= 2026–27 FC Argeș Pitești season =

FC Argeș Pitești
2026–27 season
- Manager: Bogdan Andone
- Superliga: Pre-season
- Cupa României: Pre-season

The 2026–27 season is the 74th in the history of Fotbal Club Argeș and the second consecutive season in Liga I. The club will also compete in the Cupa României.

== Transfers ==
=== In ===
Pos.	Player	Transferred from	Fee	Date	Source
DF	(Cyprus) Evagoras Antoniou	(Cyprus) APOEL	Free	1 July 2026	
MF	(France) Taylor Luvambo	(France) Le Mans	Free	1 July 2026	

=== Out ===
Pos.	Player	Transferred to	Fee	Date	Source
FW	(Tunisia) Adel Bettaieb		End of contract	1 July 2026	
DF	(Romania) Marius Briceag	(Romania) Chindia Târgoviște	End of contract	1 July 2026	
FW	(Romania) Mihai Roman	(Romania) Voluntari	Free	1 July 2026	

== Pre-season and friendlies ==
The team commenced their pre-season on 15 June in Albota and traveled six days later to Rogla, Slovenia, remaining there until 3 July. On 23 June, the opponents for the three friendly matches there were announced, which are Čukarički, eighth in the Serbian SuperLiga, then Vllaznia, finishing third in the Albanian Kategoria Superiore, and NK Jadran Dekani, tenth in the Slovenian Second League.

25 June 2026 Friendly	Argeș Pitești (Romania)	2–0	(Serbia) Čukarički	Domžale, Slovenia
18:00				Stadium: Domžale stadium

29 June 2026 Friendly	Argeș Pitești (Romania)	5–2	(Albania) KF Vllaznia	Zreče, Slovenia
18:00				Stadium: Zreče stadium

2 July 2026 Friendly	Argeș Pitești (Romania)	4–0	(Slovenia) NK Jadran Dekani	Zreče, Slovenia
18:00	19'; 23'; 33'; 53'			Stadium: Zreče stadium

10 July 2026	Argeș Pitești (Romania)	1–1	(Romania) Râmnicu Vâlcea
10:00

== Competitions ==
=== Overall record ===
Competition	First match	Last match	Starting round	Record							
Competition	First match	Last match	Starting round	Pld	W	D	L	GF	GA	GD	Win %
Superliga	17 July 2026		Matchday 1	1	0	0	1	0	2	−2	0.00
Cupa României				0	0	0	0	0	0	+0	—
Total				1	0	0	1	0	2	−2	0.00

Source: Competitions

=== Superliga ===
Pos	Team	Pld	W	D	L	GF	GA	GD	Pts	Qualification
1	FCSB	5	3	2	0	9	4	+5	11	Advances to Play-off
2	Dinamo București	5	3	1	1	11	3	+8	10	Advances to Play-off
3	Argeș Pitești	5	3	1	1	4	3	+1	10	Advances to Play-off
4	Universitatea Cluj	4	3	0	1	6	4	+2	9	Advances to Play-off
5	Petrolul Ploiești	5	3	0	2	4	6	−2	9	Advances to Play-off

Updated to match(es) played on 17 August 2026. Source: LPF (in Romanian)
Rules for classification: 1) Points; 2) Head-to-head points; 3) Head-to-head goal difference; 4) Head-to-head goals scored; 5) Goal difference; 6) Goals scored; 7) Play-off.

Pos	Team	Pld	W	D	L	GF	GA	GD	Pts	Qualification	1	2	3	4	5	6
1	1	0	0	0	0	0	0	0	0	Qualification to Champions League first qualifying round						
2	2	0	0	0	0	0	0	0	0	Qualification to Conference League second qualifying round						
3	3	0	0	0	0	0	0	0	0	Qualification to European competition play-offs						
4	4	0	0	0	0	0	0	0	0							
5	5	0	0	0	0	0	0	0	0							
6	6	0	0	0	0	0	0	0	0							

Source: LPF (in Romanian)
Rules for classification: 1) Points; 2) Points without rounding; 3) Points in the regular season; 4) Head-to-head points; 5) Head-to-head goal difference; 6) Head-to-head goals scored; 7) Goal difference; 8) Goals scored; 9) Play-off (only if needed to decide champion or teams for UEFA competitions). (Note: only criteria 7 and 8 are applied to establish the classification during the competition.

Pos	Team	Pld	W	D	L	GF	GA	GD	Pts	Qualification or relegation	7	8	9	10	11	12	13	14	15	16
7	7	0	0	0	0	0	0	0	0	Qualification to European competition play-offs										
8	8	0	0	0	0	0	0	0	0	Qualification to European competition play-offs										
9	9	0	0	0	0	0	0	0	0											
10	10	0	0	0	0	0	0	0	0											
11	11	0	0	0	0	0	0	0	0											
12	12	0	0	0	0	0	0	0	0											
13	13	0	0	0	0	0	0	0	0	Qualification to relegation play-offs										
14	14	0	0	0	0	0	0	0	0	Qualification to relegation play-offs										
15	15	0	0	0	0	0	0	0	0	Relegated to Liga II										
16	16	0	0	0	0	0	0	0	0	Relegated to Liga II										

Source: LPF (in Romanian)
Rules for classification: 1) Points; 2) Points without rounding; 3) Points in the regular season; 4) Head-to-head points; 5) Head-to-head goal difference; 6) Head-to-head goals scored; 7) Goal difference; 8) Goals scored; 9) Play-off (only if needed to decide champion or teams for UEFA competitions). (Note: only criteria 7 and 8 are applied to establish the classification during the competition.

==== Results by round ====
Round	1	2	3	4	5	6	7	8	9	10	11	12	13	14	15	16	17	18	19	20	21	22	23	24	25	26	27	28	29	30
Ground	A	H	H	A	H	A	H	A	H	A	H	A	H	A	H	H	A	A	H	A	H	A	H	A	H	A	H	A	H	A
Result	L	W																												
Position	14	8																												

Updated to match(es) played on 24 July 2026. Source:
A = Away; H = Home; W = Win; D = Draw; L = Loss

==== Results ====
The match schedule was released on 26 June 2026.

17 July 2026 1	FCSB	2–0	FC Argeș	Bucharest
21:30 UTC+3	Bîrligea 19'; Tănase 45+4' (pen.)	Report		Stadium: Steaua; Attendance: 8,424; Referee: Marian Barbu

24 July 2026 2	FC Argeș	1–0	Petrolul Ploiești	Mioveni
21:30 UTC+3	Moldoveanu 17'	Report		Stadium: Orășenesc; Attendance: 2,621; Referee: Horațiu Feșnic

1 August 2026 3	FC Argeș	v	Csíkszereda	Mioveni
				Stadium: Orășenesc
