= Unior =

Slovenian forging and tool manufacturer

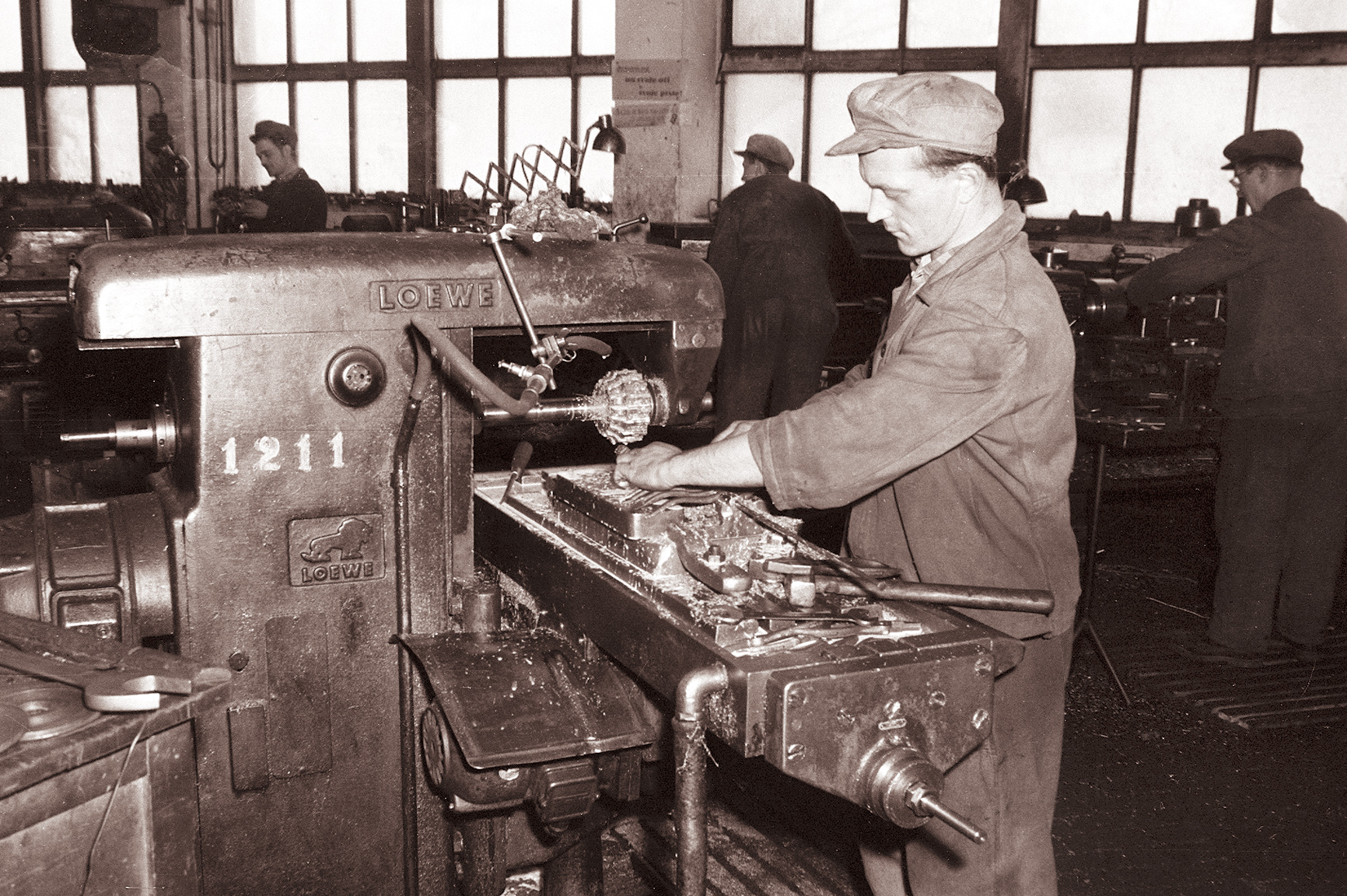
- A machinist at the Zreče forged-tool factory, 1961
- Native name: UNIOR Kovaška industrija d.d.
- Formerly: Štajerska železoindustrijska družba; Tovarna kovanega orodja Zreče; Kovaška industrija Zreče
- Type: Public (d.d.)
- Traded as: LJSE: UKIG
- ISIN: SI0031108994
- Industry: Forging, hand tool manufacturing
- Founded: 1919; 107 years ago in Zreče
- Founder: Milko Bremec; Walter Mach
- Headquarters: Kovaška cesta 10, Zreče, Slovenia
- Key people: Robert Vuga (president of the management board)
- Products: Forged automotive components, hand tools, bicycle tools
- Revenue: €228 million (group) (2025)
- Net income: −€5.1 million (group) (2025)
- Owner: Slovenian Sovereign Holding (39.4%)
- Number of employees: 2,062 (group) (2025)
- Website: www.unior.com

Unior (registered as UNIOR Kovaška industrija d.d.) is a Slovenian metal-forging and hand tool manufacturer headquartered in Zreče. Its main business is drop-forged components for the European car industry; it also makes hand tools, including bicycle tools, sold in about 120 countries. The company's shares trade on the Ljubljana Stock Exchange, and its largest shareholder is the state asset manager Slovenian Sovereign Holding, with 39.4 percent.

The company was founded in 1919 by the engineers Milko Bremec and Walter Mach and operated between the wars as Štajerska železoindustrijska družba (Styrian Iron Industry Company). The factory burned down in 1944, was rebuilt after the Second World War as Tovarna kovanega orodja Zreče (Forged Tool Factory Zreče), and in 1968 took the name Unior, formed from univerzalno orodje ("universal tools"). It became a supplier to European carmakers in the 1970s, was converted into a joint-stock company in Slovenia's 1997 privatisation, and listed on the stock exchange in 2011.

Unior has twice undergone major financial restructuring. Heavy borrowing before the 2008 financial crisis led to a 2013 master restructuring agreement with twelve creditor banks, which the company exited in 2016 through a syndicated refinancing. A second crisis followed a €54 million group loss in 2024; the company sold its tourism business and a Serbian subsidiary, signed a standstill agreement with its banks in May 2026, and was seeking fresh capital as of mid-2026.

== History ==
=== Founding and interwar years ===
The company dates its founding to 1919, when the engineers Milko Bremec (1890–1971) and Walter Mach bought an estate with a mill in Zreče, at the foot of the Pohorje range, and set up an industrial forge on the site. The business was registered at the commercial court in Maribor in 1922 as Štajerska industrijska družba (Styrian Industrial Company) and reorganised in 1925 under the name Štajerska železoindustrijska družba, a limited-liability company known by the short name "Štajerska Zreče". The factory made forged tools on an industrial scale, among them axes, picks, hoes, shovels and mining tools, and grew from about 50 workers in early 1923 to roughly 250 by 1941.

=== Second World War and nationalisation ===
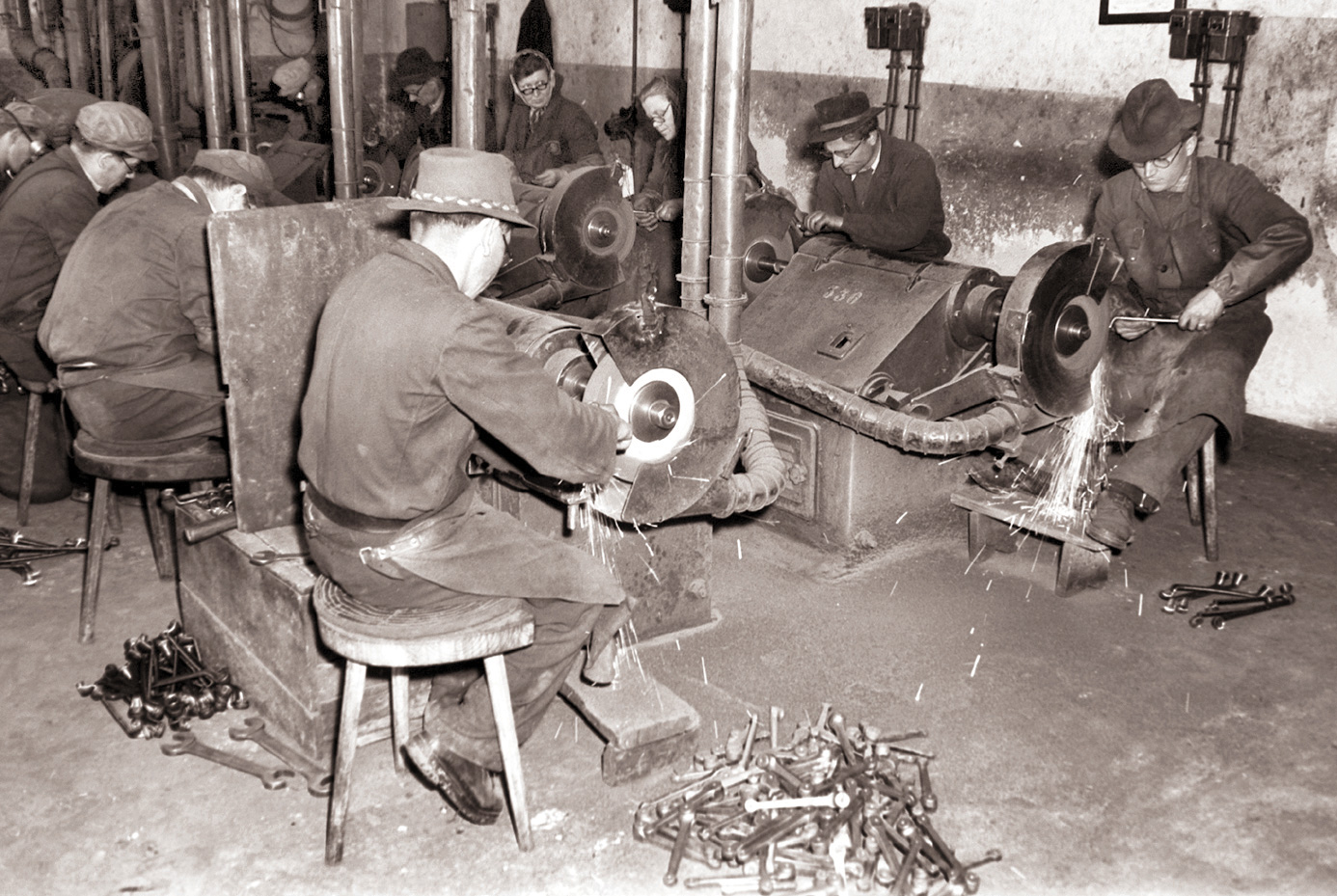
Grinding forged wrenches at the Zreče factory, 1959

German occupying forces took over the plant in April 1941 and ran it under the name Steirische Eisenindustrie – Hohlenstein. The factory was completely burned down in 1944. Neither founder recovered the business after the war. Bremec was sentenced to death in a January 1946 political trial; the sentence was commuted, and a retrial that November imposed two years of forced labour and confiscation of his property, including his half-share in the Zreče company. The Supreme Court of Slovenia acquitted him posthumously in 1994. Mach, who had stayed on as the plant's wartime manager, was arrested by the OZNA security service after the war; nothing is known of his subsequent fate, and a 2022 monograph on the founders presumes he was among the victims of Yugoslavia's post-war extrajudicial killings.

The rebuilt factory was renamed Tovarna kovanega orodja Zreče (Forged Tool Factory Zreče, TKO) in 1947 and passed into social ownership in 1950.

=== Yugoslav era ===
The factory was renamed Kovaška industrija Zreče (Zreče Forging Industry) in 1964. In 1968, after difficulties that had placed it under compulsory administration, it adopted the name Unior, from univerzalno orodje ("universal tools"). Under Marjan Osole, its general director from 1968 to 1990, the company entered the West German market in the early 1970s and from 1973 supplied the car industry with connecting rods and other forged parts; its customers included Volkswagen and BMW. A programme building special-purpose metalworking machinery was added in 1978. The same year, work started on a mountain sports centre at Rogla and on the Terme Zreče spa, the beginning of a tourism arm the company kept until 2025.

=== Independence, privatisation and listing ===
Unior was converted into a joint-stock company, UNIOR Kovaška industrija Zreče d.d., during Slovenia's post-independence privatisation; it was registered with the court in April 1997 with 2,138,200 shares. Capital increases followed in 1999 and again in February 2010, when a €10 million issue of 500,000 new shares brought the total to 2,838,414. The shares were admitted to the Ljubljana Stock Exchange in August 2011.

=== Debt crisis and first restructuring (2008–2016) ===
Unior entered the 2008 financial crisis carrying heavy debt: the parent company's financial liabilities had grown from about €80 million in 2005 to €144 million at the end of 2008, partly the result of investments outside its core business, among them ski resorts and spas. When orders collapsed in 2009, the company shortened its working week and drew on a state short-time-work scheme. In December 2009 the state-controlled funds Kapitalska družba and Slovenska odškodninska družba, together with a smaller holder, transferred a combined 45 percent of Unior's voting rights to PDP, a state restructuring vehicle; the holding later passed to Slovenian Sovereign Holding.

In July 2013 Unior signed a master restructuring agreement with all twelve of its creditor banks covering €124.5 million of debt, an arrangement the company described as the condition for continuing to operate that year. It disposed of the medical-devices subsidiary Unior Bionic in 2013, moved its tourism operations into the subsidiary Unitur in 2017, and signed the sale of the RTC Krvavec ski resort in December 2017. After returning to profit, the company exited the restructuring agreement early in December 2016 by refinancing €112.8 million through a syndicated loan from six Slovenian banks arranged by NLB.

=== Second crisis and restructuring (2024–present) ===
In 2023 the group remained profitable, with revenue of €261 million and a net profit of about €5 million. In June 2024 Robert Vuga succeeded Darko Hrastnik, who had been president of the management board since 2012. The 2024 results then showed a group net loss of €54.1 million on revenue of €249.7 million; at the parent company, roughly €24.5 million of the €41.2 million loss came from write-offs and restructuring costs in the machine-building programme, whose commercial activity was discontinued that year. Financial covenants were breached, and the group's long-term bank debt was reclassified as short-term. Over two years the parent company's workforce fell from 1,614 to 1,224; the number of directors was cut from thirteen to three, and a small plant in Stari Trg ob Kolpi was closed. An extraordinary audit of the machine-building programme's business between 2018 and 2024 was commissioned, and Slovenian media reported that criminal investigators were following its findings amid questions over whether losses had been concealed in earlier years; no charges had been reported as of late 2025.

To raise money, Unior sold Unitur, the tourism subsidiary that ran the Rogla resort and Terme Zreče, to the investment fund Advance Capital Partners in May 2025, for a price reported at €12.2 million, and sold its Serbian machining subsidiary Unior Components to a consortium of Kolektor group companies that August. An independent business review by KPMG in late 2025 reportedly concluded that the group needed about €47 million of fresh capital; management neither confirmed nor denied the figure. Slovenian Sovereign Holding rejected an offer from the Šešok family, owners of the Iskra group, to buy a majority stake for a symbolic one euro alongside a binding commitment to invest €40 million.

The 2025 group loss narrowed to €5.1 million, helped by the disposals, and the parent company returned a small profit. In May 2026 Unior signed a standstill agreement with its six creditor banks, the largest of them NLB and OTP Bank, as a step towards recapitalisation and rescheduling of its remaining debt; a market sounding for a capital increase began the following month, with Slovenian Sovereign Holding saying it was prepared to invest alongside Kapitalska družba and open to the entry of a strategic owner.

== Operations ==
Unior's continuing operations comprise two programmes, forged parts and hand tools; a third, special machine building, stopped taking new orders in 2024 and is being wound down. The group operates forges in Zreče and Vitanje in Slovenia, in Vinkovci in Croatia and, through a 50-percent joint venture, in Yuyao in China; hand tools are made at three Slovenian sites, in Zreče, Vitanje and Lenart. The group employed 2,062 people at the end of 2025, most of them in Slovenia, and the company calls itself the largest employer in its region.

=== Forging ===
Forging accounted for 81 percent of group revenue in the first nine months of 2025. About 95 percent of forge output goes to the automotive industry; customers include Volkswagen, Audi, Renault and BMW as well as component suppliers such as ZF Friedrichshafen and Bosch, and the company describes itself as the world's leading producer of forged steering-mechanism parts for passenger cars. The cycling website Pinkbike wrote in 2017 that Unior was among Europe's three largest forging companies.

=== Hand tools ===
Hand tools have been made at Zreče since the company's founding and are sold under the Unior brand in about 120 countries. Unior does nearly all of its production in-house: forging, heat treatment, machining, plating and assembly take place at its own plants, a model the trade site Bikerumor has described as rare among toolmakers.

=== Bicycle tools ===
Unior has produced a dedicated bicycle-tool range since 2005, developed out of its existing hand-tool business. Bicycle manufacturers including Trek, Specialized and Giant are among the customers of its specialist tool lines. The company entered the North American market in 2015 through a distribution agreement with Trek and opened an online store for the United States market at the end of 2016. In North America its bicycle tools carry red handles rather than the blue used elsewhere; Park Tool holds a United States trademark on the colour blue for bicycle tools.

== Ownership ==
Unior has 2,838,414 shares, which trade in the standard-market segment of the Ljubljana Stock Exchange. As of 30 September 2025 the largest shareholders were Slovenian Sovereign Holding with 39.4 percent, the steelmaker Štore Steel with 12.3 percent and the state pension-fund manager Kapitalska družba with 5.6 percent. Unior in turn holds 29.25 percent of Štore Steel. A joint attempt by the steelmaker's shareholders to sell it collapsed in November 2024, after the steel group SIJ withdrew an indicative €70 million offer; Unior has said it is continuing the sale process for its stake.

== Sponsorship ==
Unior supplies workshop tools to professional cycling teams. Team Sky named Unior its official tool partner from the 2016 season, at a time when its tools were also used by the Etixx–Quick-Step, Movistar Team and Trek–Segafredo teams. As of 2026, it supplies the Trek WorldTour team, which races as Lidl–Trek, along with several mountain-bike teams, and together with the Slovenian brake-pad maker Sinter it runs a factory mountain-bike racing team, Unior–Sinter.
