= Rogla (settlement) =

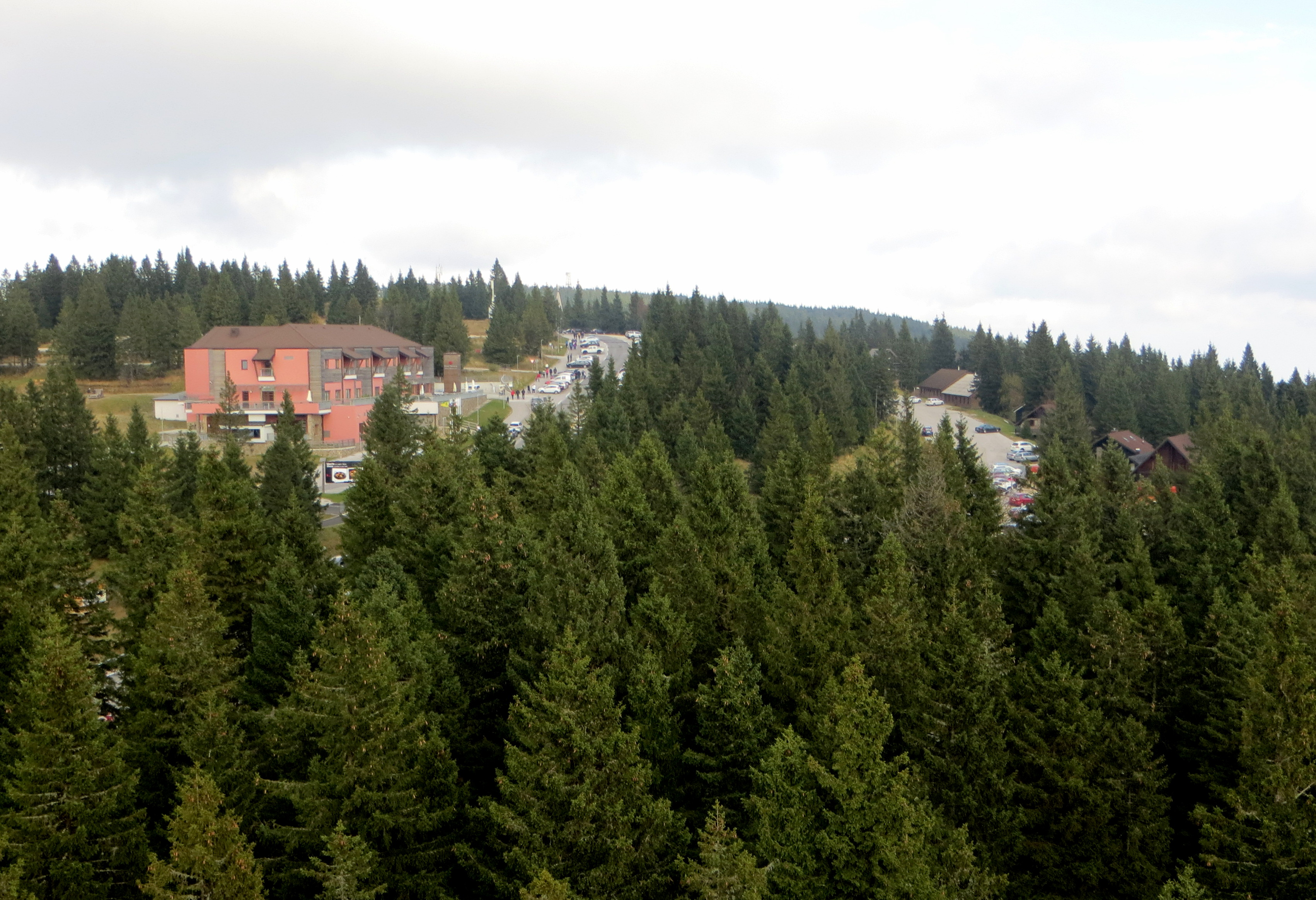

- Location in Slovenia
- Coordinates: 46°27′10″N 15°20′01″E
- Country: Slovenia
- Traditional region: Styria
- Statistical region: Savinja
- Municipality: Zreče

Area
  - Total: 5.7 km^{2} (2.2 sq mi)
- Elevation: 1,490 m (4,890 ft)

Population (2022)
  - Total: 2
- Climate: Dfc

Rogla (pronounced [ˈɾɔːɡla]) is a settlement in the Pohorje Hills north of Zreče in northeastern Slovenia. The area is part of the traditional region of Styria. It is now included with the rest of the Municipality of Zreče in the Savinja Statistical Region. It largely consists of infrastructure for the Rogla Ski Resort.

== Name ==
The village of Rogla is located on the west slope of Mount Rogla, with which it shares its name. Rogla was attested in written sources in 1763–87 as Vitenska Planina and Wittenska Planina. The Slovene name Rogla is derived from the Slovene common noun roglja 'forked tree-covered mountain ridge', referring to the local topography.

== History ==
Rogla was created as a separate settlement in 1982, when its territory was administratively separated from the village of Hudinja.
