= Osredek pri Zrečah =

Osredek pri Zrečah Osredek (until 1998)
- Location in Slovenia
- Coordinates: 46°22′6.02″N 15°22′54.72″E
- Country: Slovenia
- Traditional region: Styria
- Statistical region: Savinja
- Municipality: Zreče

Area
  - Total: 1.18 km^{2} (0.46 sq mi)
- Elevation: 426.7 m (1,400 ft)

Population (2002)
  - Total: 122

Osredek pri Zrečah (pronounced [ɔˈsɾeːdək pɾi ˈzɾeːtʃax]) is a small settlement immediately west of the town of Zreče in northeastern Slovenia. The area is part of the traditional region of Styria. It is now included with the rest of the Municipality of Zreče in the Savinja Statistical Region.

== History ==
Osredek was a hamlet of Križevec until 1994, when it was administratively separated and became a village in its own right named Osredek. In 1998, it was renamed Osredek pri Zrečah (literally, 'Osredek near Zreče').

== Lake Zreče ==
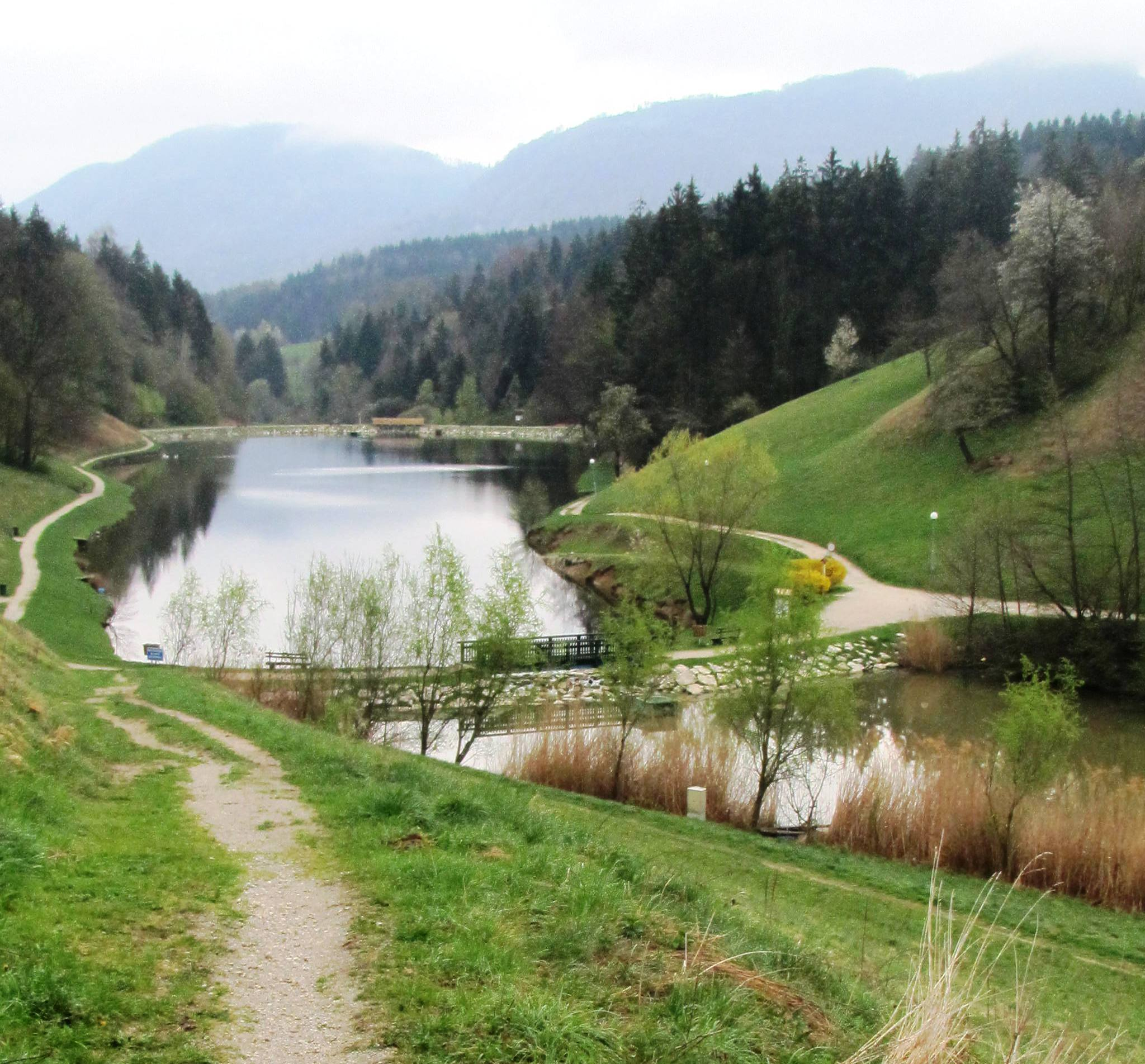
Lake Zreče

Lake Zreče (Slovene: Zreško jezero) lies within the territory of the settlement. Lake Zreče is a reservoir that was created in 2000 by damming Koprivnica Creek, a right tributary of the Dravinja River. The reservoir has two parts; the lower part of the reservoir is 700 m long with an area of 13,500 m², and the upper part is 300 m long with an area of 2,500 m². The upper part is used as a spawning ground. The reservoir is 8 m deep at its deepest point.
