= Gračič =

- Location in Slovenia
- Coordinates: 46°22′12.1″N 15°24′48.47″E
- Country: Slovenia
- Traditional region: Styria
- Statistical region: Savinja
- Municipality: Zreče

Area
  - Total: 0.72 km^{2} (0.28 sq mi)
- Elevation: 451.8 m (1,482 ft)

Population (2002)
  - Total: 58
- Climate: Cfb

Gračič (pronounced [ɡɾaˈtʃitʃ]) is a small settlement east of Zreče in northeastern Slovenia. The area is part of the traditional region of Styria. It is now included with the rest of the Municipality of Zreče in the Savinja Statistical Region.
