= Radana Vas =

- Location in Slovenia
- Coordinates: 46°21′51.19″N 15°24′7.14″E
- Country: Slovenia
- Traditional region: Styria
- Statistical region: Savinja
- Municipality: Zreče

Area
  - Total: 0.83 km^{2} (0.32 sq mi)
- Elevation: 367.1 m (1,204 ft)

Population (2002)
  - Total: 140

Radana Vas (pronounced [ˈɾaːdana ˈʋaːs]; Slovene: Radana vas) is a settlement on the Dravinja River southeast of Zreče in northeastern Slovenia. The area is part of the traditional region of Styria. It is now included with the rest of the Municipality of Zreče in the Savinja Statistical Region.
