= Črešnova =

- Location in Slovenia
- Coordinates: 46°23′40.46″N 15°23′32.83″E
- Country: Slovenia
- Traditional region: Styria
- Statistical region: Savinja
- Municipality: Zreče

Area
  - Total: 0.86 km^{2} (0.33 sq mi)
- Elevation: 664.3 m (2,179 ft)

Population (2002)
  - Total: 97
- Climate: Dfb

Črešnova (pronounced [ˈtʃɾeːʃnɔʋa]) is a small settlement in the hills north of Zreče in northeastern Slovenia. The area is part of the traditional region of Styria. It is now included with the rest of the Municipality of Zreče in the Savinja Statistical Region.
