= Polajna =

- Location in Slovenia
- Coordinates: 46°22′16.18″N 15°20′34.88″E
- Country: Slovenia
- Traditional region: Styria
- Statistical region: Savinja
- Municipality: Zreče

Area
  - Total: 0.15 km^{2} (0.058 sq mi)
- Elevation: 509.7 m (1,672 ft)

Polajna (pronounced [pɔˈlaːi̯na]) is a small settlement in the Municipality of Zreče in northeastern Slovenia. It lies on the main road from Zreče to Vitanje. The area is part of the traditional region of Styria and is now included with the rest of the municipality in the Savinja Statistical Region.

== History ==
Polajna was a hamlet of Stranice until 1998, when it was administratively separated and became a village in its own right. Further territorial adjustment was made between Polajna and the village of Mala Gora in 2004.

== Mass graves ==
Polajna is the site of two known mass graves from the end of the Second World War. They contain the remains of an unknown number of Croatian soldiers and civilians that were disarmed and then murdered at the end of the war. Most of the victims were murdered in the mine, but a smaller group was murdered at the tailings dump. The Polajna Mine Mass Grave (Slovene: Grobišče rudnik Polajna), also known as the Hasenbichl Mine Mass Grave (Grobišče Hasenbichlov rudnik), is located on a slope north of the houses at Polajna no. 10. It is an abandoned mine shaft. The Mine Tailings Mass Grave (Grobišče pod rudniško jalovino) is located south of the settlement, 60 meters (200 ft) from the house at Poljana no. 1.
