= Zahrib, Zagorje ob Savi =

Zahrib
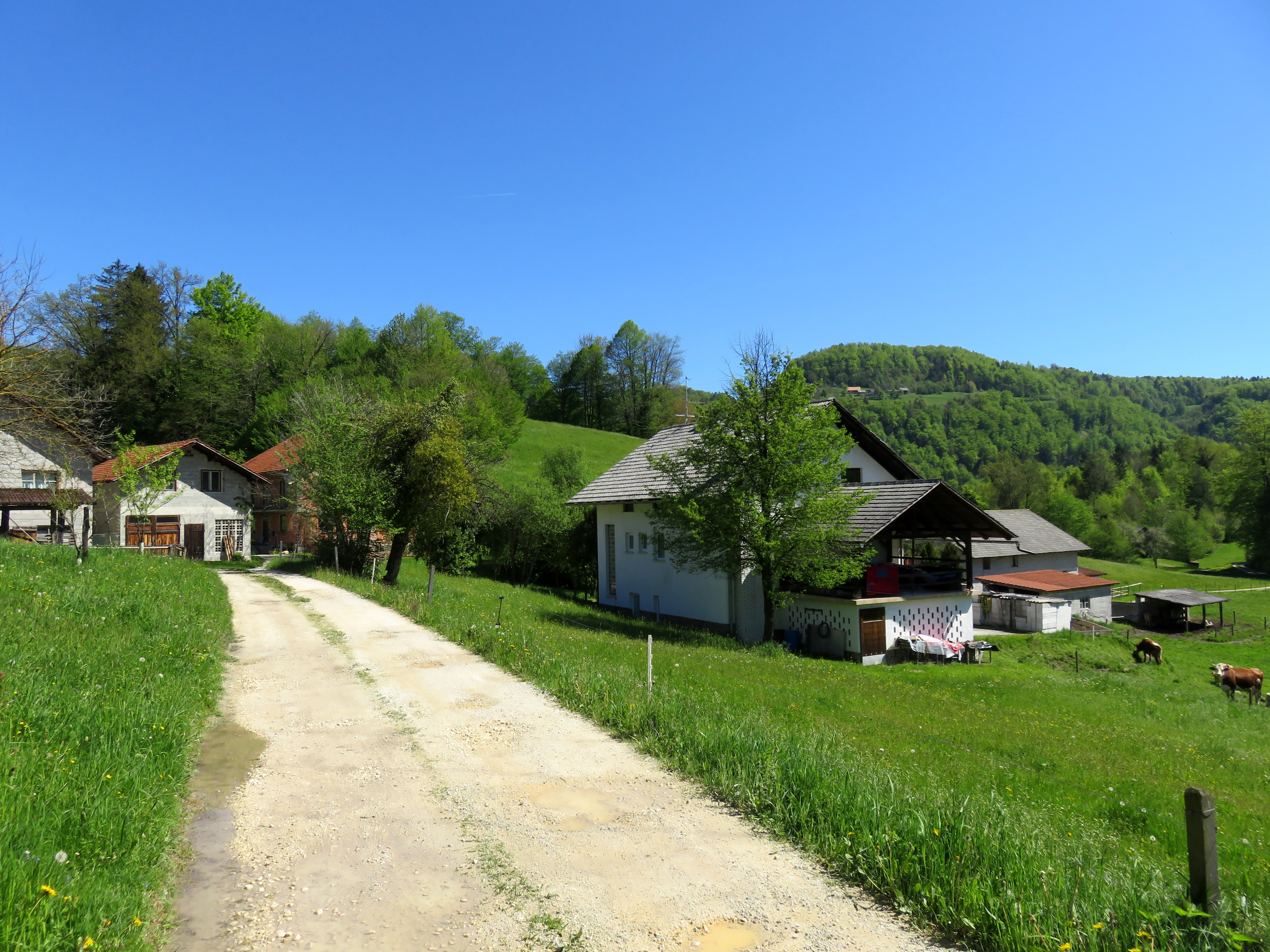

- Location in Slovenia
- Coordinates: 46°8′57″N 14°53′12″E
- Country: Slovenia
- Traditional region: Upper Carniola
- Statistical region: Central Sava
- Municipality: Zagorje ob Savi
- Elevation: 410 m (1,350 ft)

Zahrib (pronounced [zaˈxɾiːp], German: Sahrib) is a former village in central Slovenia in the Municipality of Zagorje ob Savi. It is now part of the village of Mlinše. It is part of the traditional region of Upper Carniola and is now included in the Central Sava Statistical Region.

== Geography ==
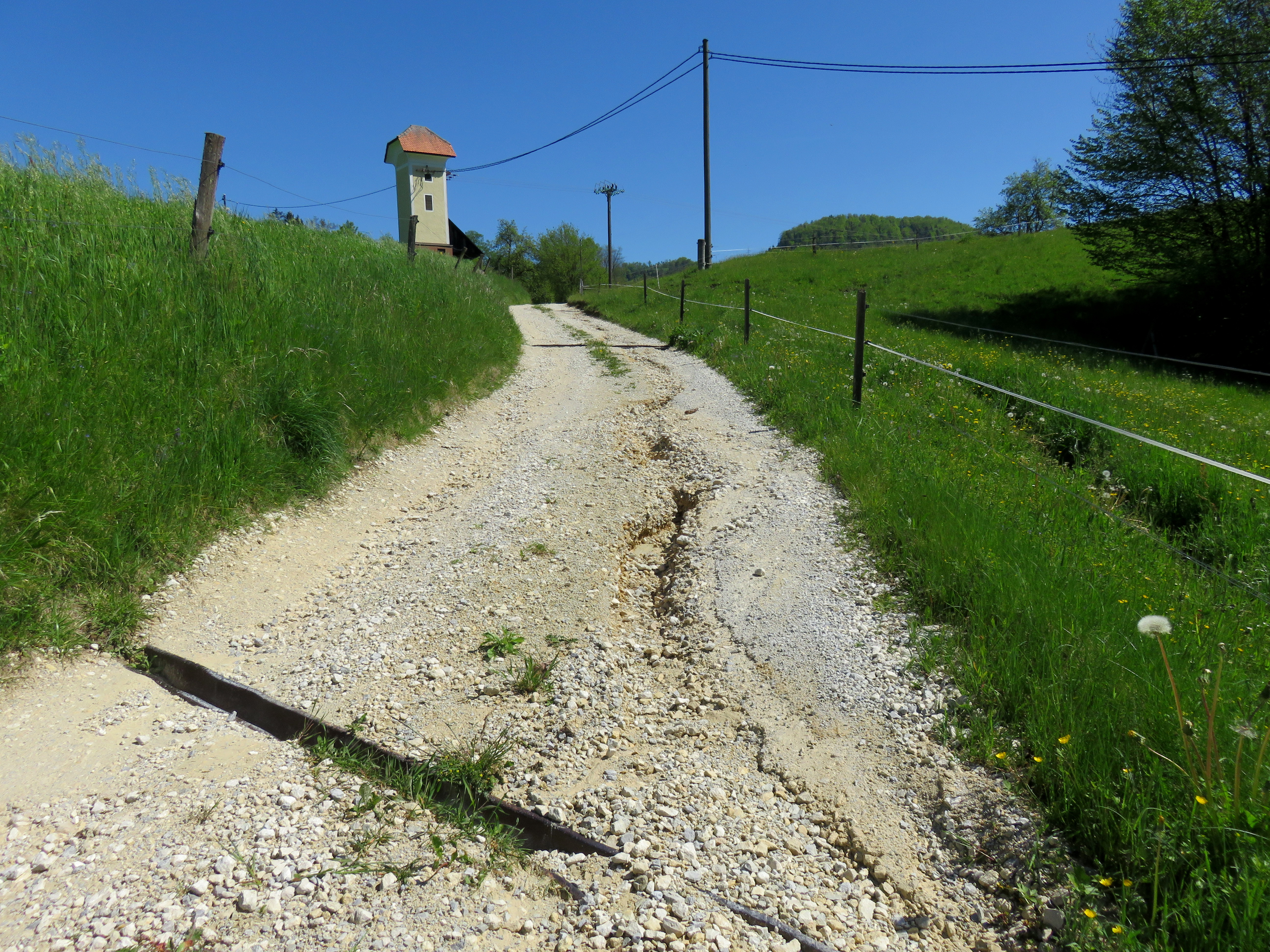
Road from Mlinše to Zahrib

Zahrib stands on a hill northeast of Mlinše. It is connected to Mlinše by a gravel road that regularly washes out after storms and becomes impassable.

== History ==
Zahrib had a population of 15 (in four houses) in 1880, and 16 (in three houses) in 1900. Zahrib was annexed by Briše in 1953, ending its existence as a separate settlement. It is now part of Mlinše, which was also a hamlet of Briše until 1953.
