= Padeški Vrh =

- Location in Slovenia
- Coordinates: 46°25′9.47″N 15°22′16.67″E
- Country: Slovenia
- Traditional region: Styria
- Statistical region: Savinja
- Municipality: Zreče

Area
  - Total: 3.35 km^{2} (1.29 sq mi)
- Elevation: 899.3 m (2,950 ft)

Population (2002)
  - Total: 137
- Climate: Dfb

Padeški Vrh (pronounced [ˈpaːdɛʃki ˈʋəɾx]) is a settlement in the Pohorje Hills north of the town of Zreče in northeastern Slovenia. The area is part of the traditional region of Styria. It is now included with the rest of the Municipality of Zreče in the Savinja Statistical Region.
