= Zabork =

- Location in Slovenia
- Coordinates: 46°22′33.88″N 15°21′11.03″E
- Country: Slovenia
- Traditional region: Styria
- Statistical region: Savinja
- Municipality: Zreče

Area
  - Total: 1.99 km^{2} (0.77 sq mi)
- Elevation: 616.3 m (2,022 ft)

Population (2002)
  - Total: 58

Zabork (pronounced [zaˈboːɾk]) is a dispersed settlement in the hills north of Stranice in the Municipality of Zreče in northeastern Slovenia. The area is part of the traditional region of Styria. It is now included with the rest of the municipality in the Savinja Statistical Region.

== History ==
The hamlet of Zabork (in some sources, Zaburk) was administratively separated from Stranice in 1998 and made a settlement in its own right.
