= Mala Gora, Zreče =

Mala Gora
- Location in Slovenia
- Coordinates: 46°22′9.4″N 15°20′27.35″E
- Country: Slovenia
- Traditional region: Styria
- Statistical region: Savinja
- Municipality: Zreče

Area
  - Total: 1.97 km^{2} (0.76 sq mi)
- Elevation: 551.4 m (1,809 ft)

Population (2002)
  - Total: 45

Mala Gora (pronounced [ˈmaːla ˈɡɔːɾa]) is a small dispersed settlement in the Municipality of Zreče in northeastern Slovenia. The area is part of the traditional region of Styria. It is now included with the rest of the municipality in the Savinja Statistical Region.

== History ==
Until 1998, Mala Gora was a hamlet of Stranice, when it was administratively separated and made a settlement in its own right. Further territorial adjustment was made between Mala Gora and the village of Polajna in 2004.
