= Gornja Vas, Zreče =

Gornja Vas
- Location in Slovenia
- Coordinates: 46°21′43.99″N 15°21′16.32″E
- Country: Slovenia
- Traditional region: Styria
- Statistical region: Savinja
- Municipality: Zreče

Area
  - Total: 0.42 km^{2} (0.16 sq mi)
- Elevation: 481.6 m (1,580 ft)

Population (2002)
  - Total: 48

Gornja Vas (pronounced [ˈɡoːɾnja ˈʋaːs]; Slovene: Gornja vas) is a small settlement west of Stranice in the Municipality of Zreče in northeastern Slovenia. The area is part of the traditional region of Styria. It is now included with the rest of the municipality in the Savinja Statistical Region.

== History ==
Gornja Vas was administratively separated from Stranice in 1998 and made an independent settlement.
