= Lipa, Zreče =

Lipa
- Location in Slovenia
- Coordinates: 46°24′4.14″N 15°23′23.17″E
- Country: Slovenia
- Traditional region: Styria
- Statistical region: Savinja
- Municipality: Zreče

Area
  - Total: 0.33 km^{2} (0.13 sq mi)
- Elevation: 761.8 m (2,499 ft)

Population (2002)
  - Total: 114

Lipa (pronounced [ˈliːpa]) is a small settlement in the Municipality of Zreče in northeastern Slovenia. It lies on the main road leading west from Zreče towards Vitanje. The area is part of the traditional region of Styria. It is now included with the rest of the municipality in the Savinja Statistical Region.

== History ==
Lipa was administratively separated from Stranice in 1998 and made an independent settlement.
