= Frankolovo crime =

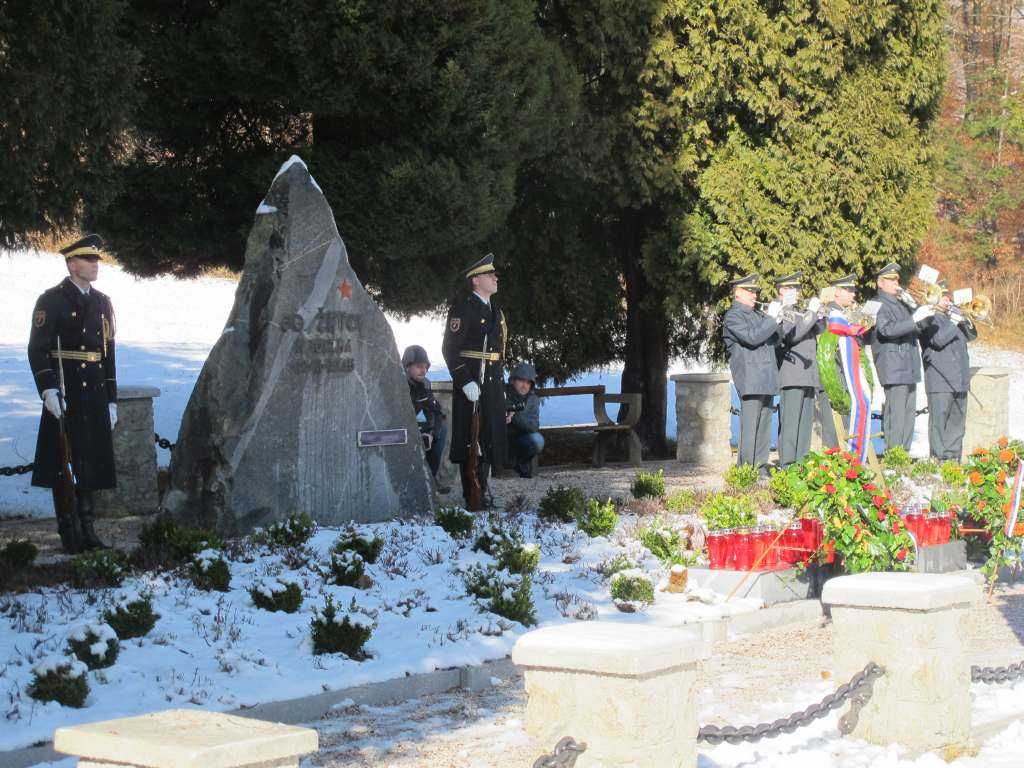
Commemoration at the Frankolovo crime memorial in 2016

The Frankolovo crime (Slovene: Frankolovski zločin) was one of the worst Nazi war crimes in the territory of present-day Slovenia during World War II. On February 12, 1945, members of the Wehrmacht killed one hundred Slovene civilians at Graben in Stranice, near Frankolovo.

The crime was committed as revenge for a Slovene partisan ambush in Tesno gorge, when on February 2, 1945, important local Nazi officer Anton Dorfmeister was mortally wounded, dying the next day in Celje hospital. In retaliation, the Nazis gathered one hundred hostages from the prisons of Celje, Maribor, and Trbovlje and hanged them on trees along the road.
