= Spodnje Stranice =

Spodnje Stranice Graben (until 1999)
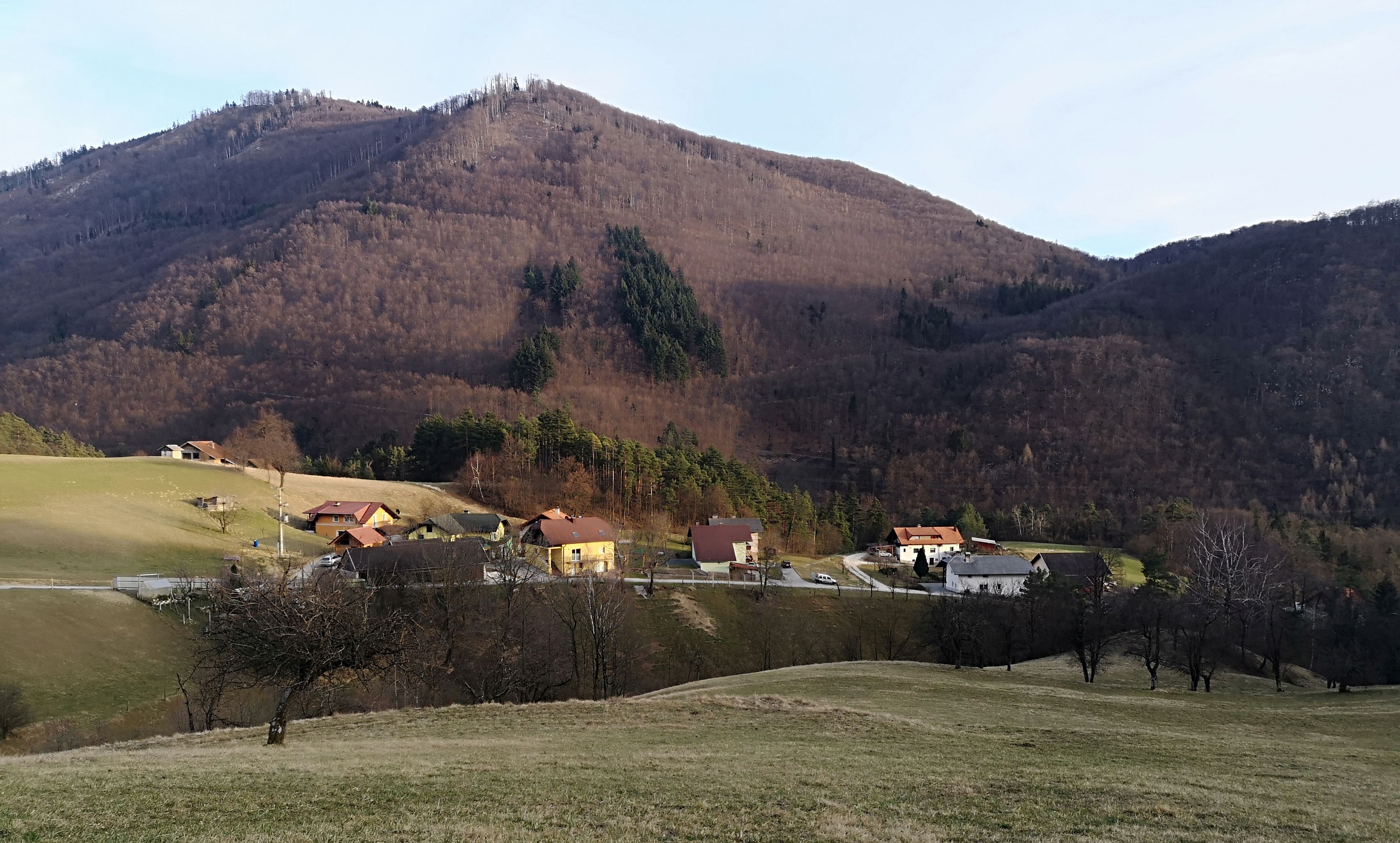

- Location in Slovenia
- Coordinates: 46°21′1.68″N 15°20′35.82″E
- Country: Slovenia
- Traditional region: Styria
- Statistical region: Savinja
- Municipality: Zreče

Area
  - Total: 1.76 km^{2} (0.68 sq mi)
- Elevation: 457.8 m (1,502 ft)

Population (2023)
  - Total: 181

Spodnje Stranice (pronounced [ˈspoːdnjɛ stɾaˈniːtsɛ]) is a settlement in the Municipality of Zreče in northeastern Slovenia. It lies on the main road to Vojnik, southwest of the town of Zreče. The area is part of the traditional region of Styria. It is now included with the rest of the municipality in the Savinja Statistical Region.

== History ==
In 1998, the hamlet of Graben was administratively separated from Stranice and made a settlement in its own right. In 1999, Graben was renamed Spodnje Stranice (literally, 'lower Stranice').
