= Bukovje =

Bukovje (meaning "Beech trees") is a Slavic place name that may refer to:

- Bukovje, Brežice, a village in the Municipality of Brežice, southeastern Slovenia
- Bukovje, Dravograd, a village in the Municipality of Dravograd, northeastern Slovenia
- Bukovje, Postojna, a village in the Municipality of Postojna, southwestern Slovenia
- Bukovje pri Slivnici, a village in the Municipality of Šentjur, eastern Slovenia
- Bukovje v Babni Gori, a village in the Municipality of Šmarje pri Jelšah, eastern Slovenia

== See also ==
- Bukovlje (disambiguation)
- Bukevje (disambiguation)
