= Municipality of Zreče =

Municipality of Slovenia

Municipality of Zreče Občina Zreče
- Municipality
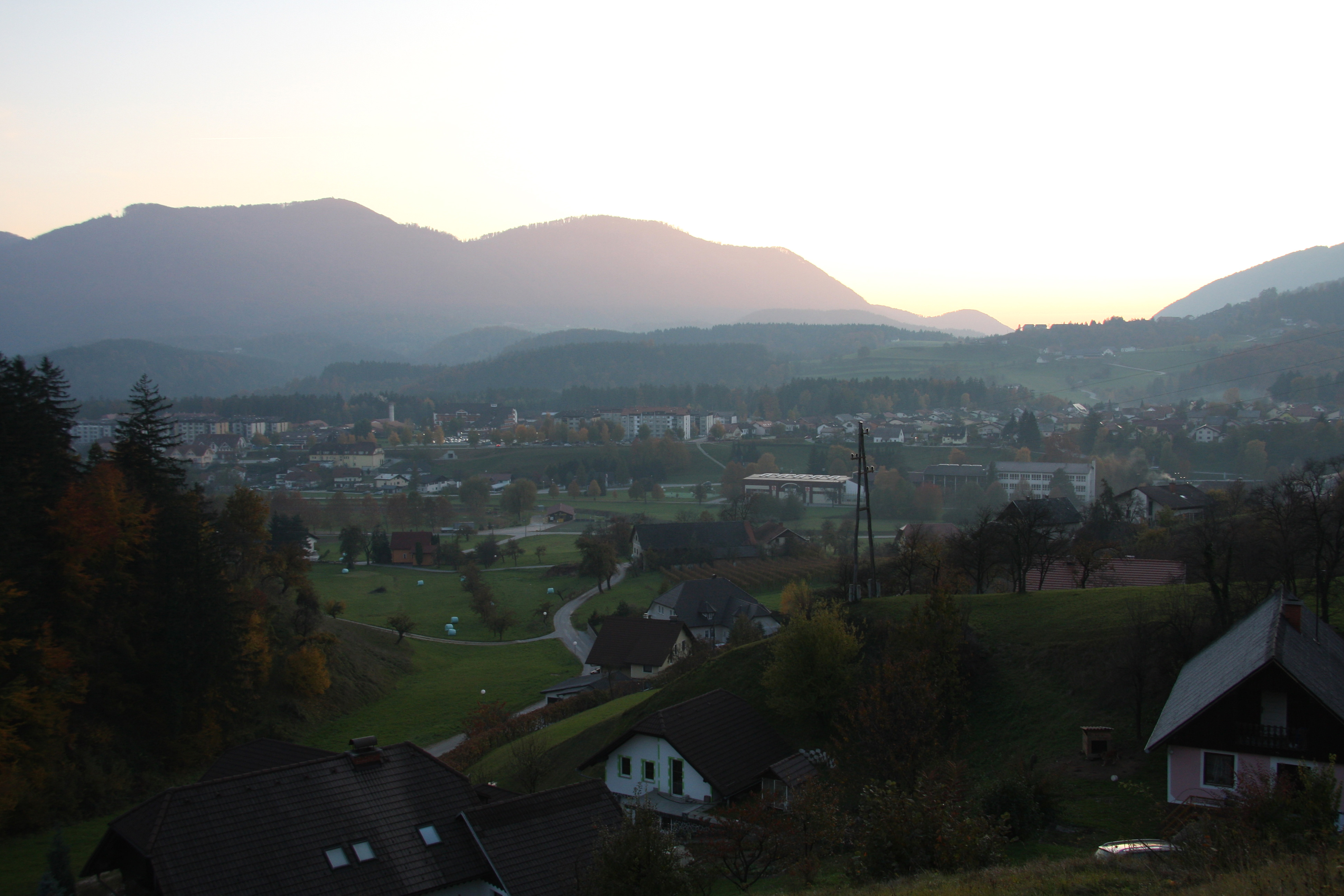

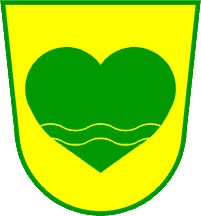
- Coat of arms

- Location of the Municipality of Zreče in Slovenia
- Coordinates: 46°22′30″N 15°23′8″E
- Country: Slovenia

Government
  - Mayor: Boris Podvršnik

Area
  - Total: 67 km^{2} (26 sq mi)

Population (2008)
  - Total: 6,443
  - Density: 96/km^{2} (250/sq mi)
- Time zone: UTC+01 (CET)
  - Summer (DST): UTC+02 (CEST)
- Website: www.zrece.si

The Municipality of Zreče (pronounced [ˈzɾeːtʃɛ]; Slovene: Občina Zreče) is a municipality below the slopes of Pohorje in northeastern Slovenia. Its seat is the town of Zreče. The area is part of the traditional region of Styria. The municipality is now included in the Savinja Statistical Region.

== Geography ==
The municipality covers an area of 67 square kilometers (26 square miles) at the foothills of the Pohorje range between 360 and 1,517 meters (1,181 and 4,977 ft). The central part of the municipality is highly segmented with much of the northern part with hills with an elevation of over 1,000 meters (3,281 feet) and a continental climate.

Zreče and the neighboring municipalities in the region

=== Settlements ===
In addition to the municipal seat of Zreče, the municipality also includes the following settlements:

- Bezovje nad Zrečami
- Boharina
- Bukovlje
- Čretvež
- Črešnova
- Dobrovlje
- Gorenje pri Zrečah
- Gornja Vas
- Gračič
- Koroška Vas na Pohorju
- Križevec
- Lipa
- Loška Gora pri Zrečah
- Mala Gora
- Osredek pri Zrečah
- Padeški Vrh
- Planina na Pohorju
- Polajna
- Radana Vas
- Resnik
- Rogla
- Skomarje
- Spodnje Stranice
- Stranice
- Zabork
- Zlakova

== Administration ==
The current mayor is Boris Podvršnik. The mayor leads the municipal council and oversees the implementation of its decision. He is responsible for implementing the county policy and supervises the work of the municipal administration, public services, institutions and funds. The distinctive yellow and green coat of arms and flag of Zreče were adopted in September 1995. It is yellow, vertically divided with a green heart with two wavy lines at the bottom of it.
