= Mlinše =

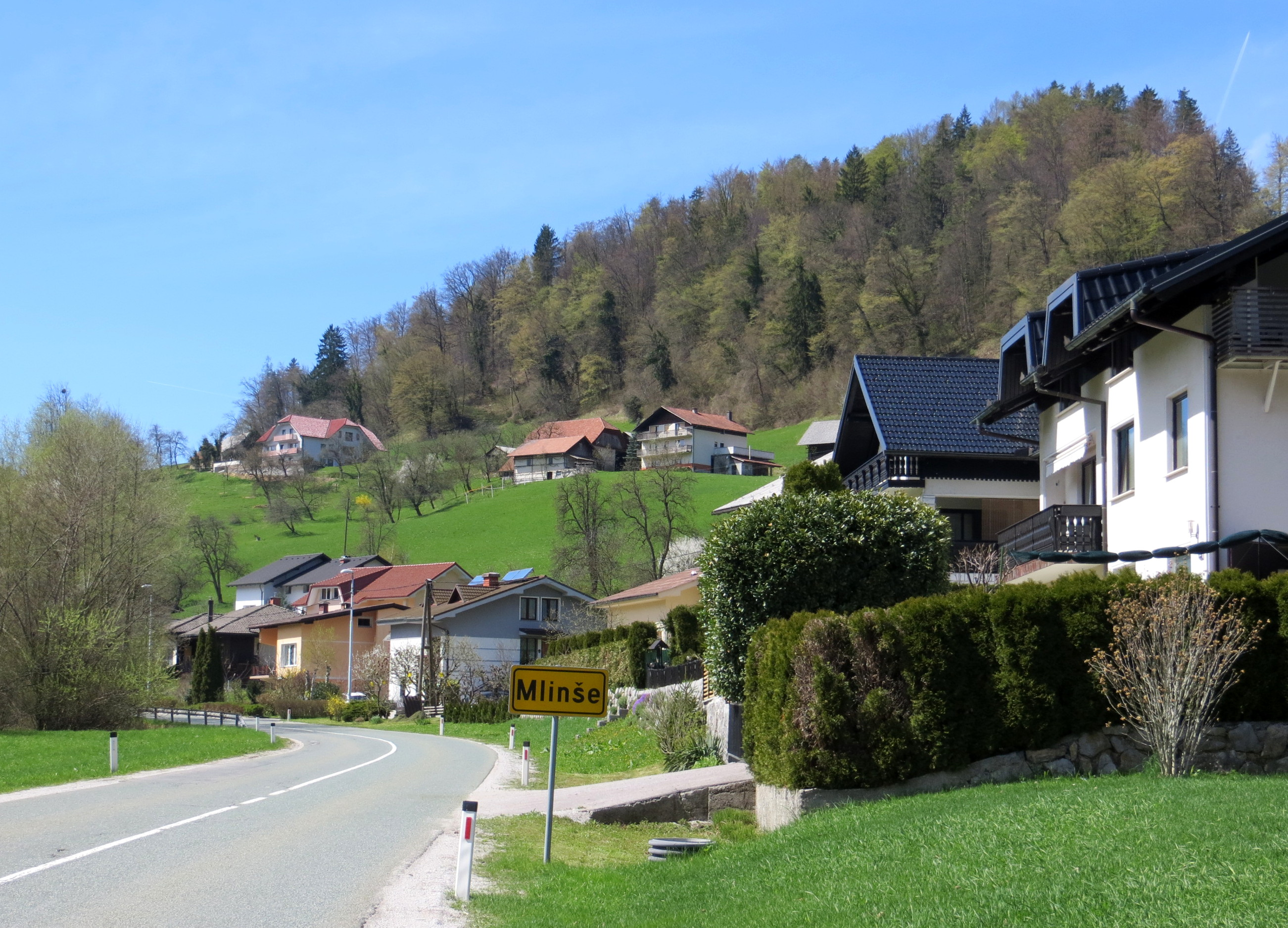

- Location in Slovenia
- Coordinates: 46°8′50.35″N 14°53′2.9″E
- Country: Slovenia
- Traditional region: Upper Carniola
- Statistical region: Central Sava
- Municipality: Zagorje ob Savi

Area
  - Total: 0.94 km^{2} (0.36 sq mi)
- Elevation: 387.5 m (1,271 ft)

Population (2002)
  - Total: 214
- Postal code: 1411

Mlinše (pronounced [ˈmliːnʃɛ]; in older sources also Mlinšče, German: Mlinsche) is a village in the Municipality of Zagorje ob Savi in central Slovenia. It lies on the main road to Moravče east of Zagorje. The area is part of the traditional region of Upper Carniola. It is now included with the rest of the municipality in the Central Sava Statistical Region.

== History ==
During the Second World War, German forces discovered a bunker of Liberation Front agitators above Mlinše in the winter of 1944/45. Most of them were hanged at Frankolovo in early 1945, and a plaque in Mlinše commemorates the incident.

Mlinše was a hamlet of Briše until 1953, when it became a separate village.
