= Boharina =

- Village
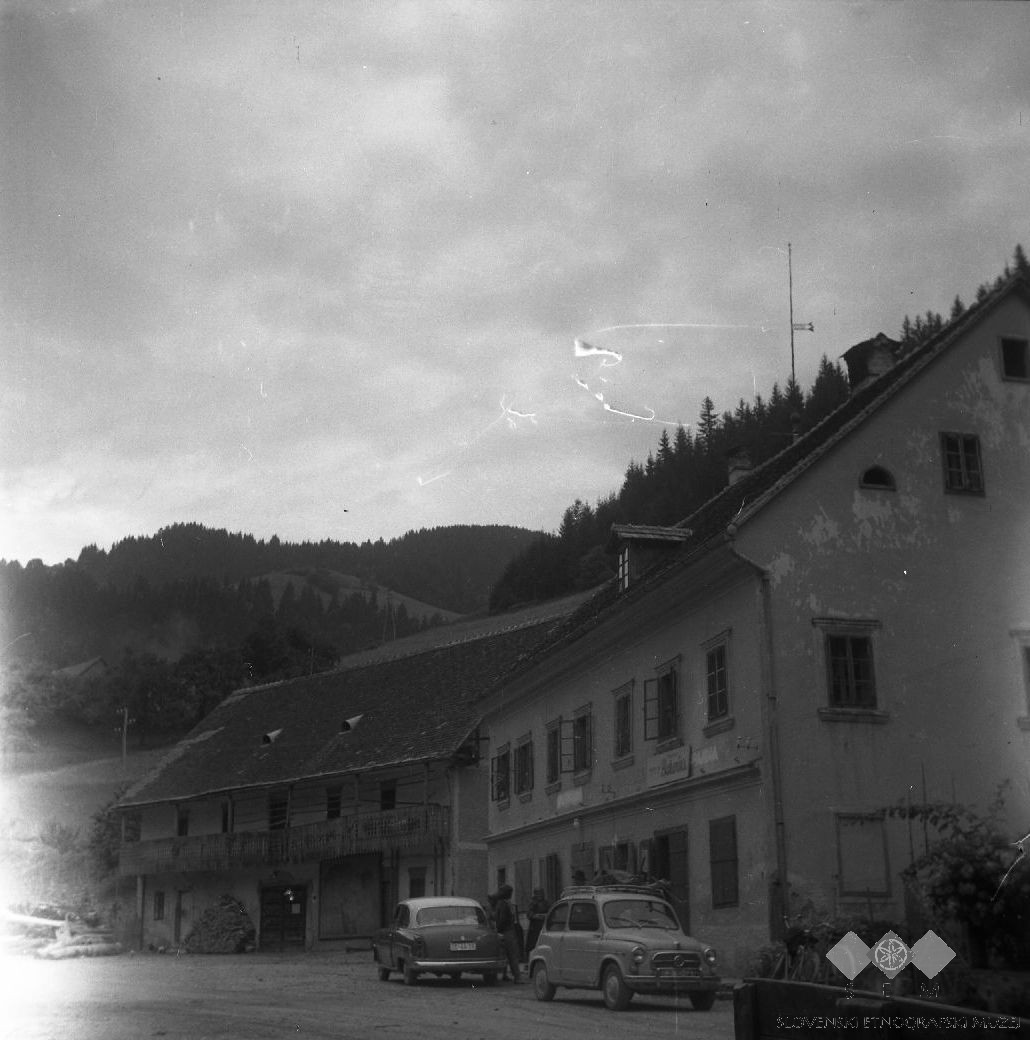
- Boharina in 1963

- Location in Slovenia
- Coordinates: 46°24′15.09″N 15°22′6″E
- Country: Slovenia
- Traditional region: Styria
- Statistical region: Savinja
- Municipality: Zreče

Area
  - Total: 2.54 km^{2} (0.98 sq mi)
- Elevation: 663.6 m (2,177 ft)

Population (2002)
  - Total: 208
- Climate: Dfb

Boharina (pronounced [bɔxaˈɾiːna]) is a settlement in the Municipality of Zreče in northeastern Slovenia. It lies in the foothills of the Pohorje Hills, above the left bank of the upper Dravinja River, just north of Zreče. The area is part of the traditional region of Styria. It is now included with the rest of the municipality in the Savinja Statistical Region.
