= Bukevje =

Bukevje may refer to:

- Bukevje, Sveti Ivan Zelina, a village near Sveti Ivan Zelina, Zagreb County, Croatia
- Bukevje, Orle, a village near Orle, Zagreb County, Croatia

== See also ==
- Bukovje (disambiguation)
