= Bezovje nad Zrečami =

- Location in Slovenia
- Coordinates: 46°23′49.58″N 15°24′0.34″E
- Country: Slovenia
- Traditional region: Styria
- Statistical region: Savinja
- Municipality: Zreče

Area
  - Total: 1.12 km^{2} (0.43 sq mi)
- Elevation: 575.8 m (1,889 ft)

Population (2002)
  - Total: 193

Bezovje nad Zrečami (pronounced [bɛˈzoːu̯jɛ nad ˈzɾeːtʃami]) is a small settlement in the Municipality of Zreče in northeastern Slovenia. The area is part of the traditional region of Styria. It is now included with the rest of the municipality in the Savinja Statistical Region.

== Name ==
The name of the settlement was changed from Bezovje to Bezovje nad Zrečami in 1953.
