= Zlakova =

- Location in Slovenia
- Coordinates: 46°23′11.84″N 15°24′8.67″E
- Country: Slovenia
- Traditional region: Styria
- Statistical region: Savinja
- Municipality: Zreče

Area
  - Total: 1.48 km^{2} (0.57 sq mi)
- Elevation: 561.3 m (1,842 ft)

Population (2002)
  - Total: 155
- Climate: Cfb

Zlakova (pronounced [ˈzlaːkɔʋa]; German: Slakova) is a settlement in the Municipality of Zreče in northeastern Slovenia. It lies in the hills just north of the town of Zreče. The area is part of the traditional region of Styria. It is now included with the rest of the municipality in the Savinja Statistical Region.

== Church ==
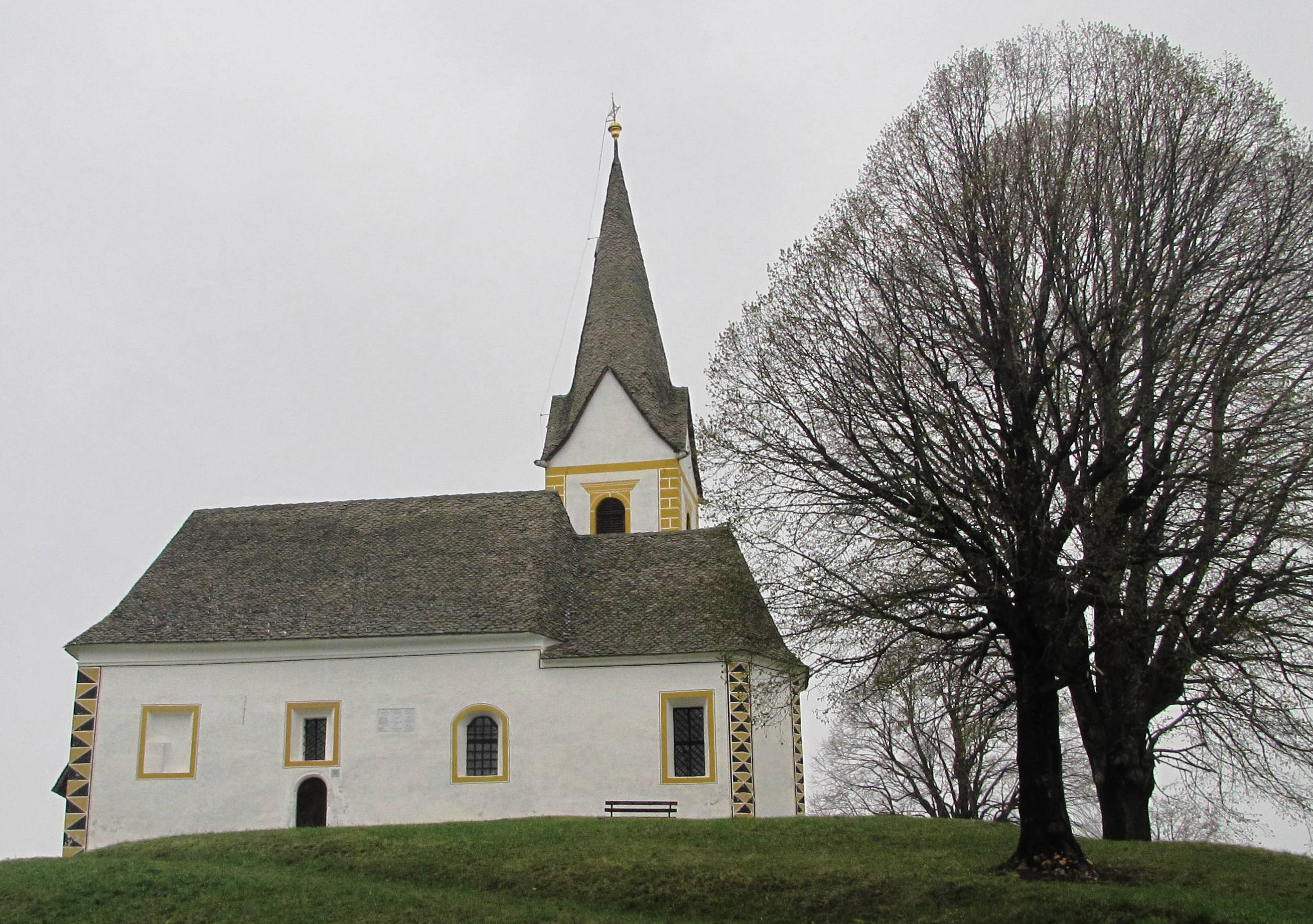
St. Martin's Church in Zlakova

The local church is dedicated to Saint Martin and belongs to the Parish of Zreče. It is a Late Gothic building that was extended and vaulted in 1739. The oldest part of the church (the name, chancel, and bell tower) probably dates from 1686, the year carved on the door casing of the bell tower. In addition to the main altar consecrated to Saint Martin, the church has side altars consecrated to Saint Oswald and Saint Lucy. Both side altars date from 1664. The church's belltower contains three bells, dedicated to Saint Martin (751 kg), Saint Oswald (318 kg), and Saint Lucy (194 kg).
