= Loška Gora pri Zrečah =

Loška Gora pri Zrečah Loška Gora (until 1998)
- Location in Slovenia
- Coordinates: 46°23′40.21″N 15°21′44.27″E
- Country: Slovenia
- Traditional region: Styria
- Statistical region: Savinja
- Municipality: Zreče

Area
  - Total: 2.53 km^{2} (0.98 sq mi)
- Elevation: 714 m (2,343 ft)

Population (2002)
  - Total: 161
- Climate: Cfb

Loška Gora pri Zrečah (pronounced [ˈloːʃka ˈɡɔːɾa pɾi ˈzɾeːtʃax]) is a settlement above the right banks of the Dravinja River in the Municipality of Zreče in northeastern Slovenia. The area is part of the traditional region of Styria. It is now included with the rest of the municipality in the Savinja Statistical Region.

== Name ==
Until 1998, the name of the village was simply Loška Gora. The settlement was attested in 1279 as Luchsperch and the name is derived from the common noun log 'wooded low-lying meadow; woods'. The name therefore literally means 'wooded mountain', and the epithet pri Zrečah 'near Zreče' distinguishes it from other settlements with the same name.

== Castle ==
Remains of a 13th-century castle known as Lušperk Castle, also referred to as Loški grad, can be seen on a hill northwest of the settlement.
