= Planina na Pohorju =

- Location in Slovenia
- Coordinates: 46°25′33.79″N 15°23′43.02″E
- Country: Slovenia
- Traditional region: Styria
- Statistical region: Savinja
- Municipality: Zreče

Area
  - Total: 6.32 km^{2} (2.44 sq mi)
- Elevation: 1,056.5 m (3,466 ft)

Population (2002)
  - Total: 194
- Climate: Dfb

Planina na Pohorju (pronounced [plaˈnìːna na ˈpóːxɔrju]) is a settlement in the Municipality of Zreče in northeastern Slovenia. It lies in the Pohorje Hills, north of the town of Zreče. The area is part of the traditional region of Styria. It is now included with the rest of the municipality in the Savinja Statistical Region.

== Name ==
The name of the settlement was changed from Planina to Planina na Pohorju in 1953.
