= Dobrovlje, Zreče =

Dobrovlje
- Location in Slovenia
- Coordinates: 46°21′27.57″N 15°24′0.88″E
- Country: Slovenia
- Traditional region: Styria
- Statistical region: Savinja
- Municipality: Zreče

Area
  - Total: 1.48 km^{2} (0.57 sq mi)
- Elevation: 372.8 m (1,223 ft)

Population (2002)
  - Total: 341

Dobrovlje (pronounced [dɔˈbɾoːu̯ljɛ]) is a settlement in the Municipality of Zreče in northeastern Slovenia. It lies on the Dravinja River, halfway between Zreče and Slovenske Konjice. The area is part of the traditional region of Styria. It is now included with the rest of the municipality in the Savinja Statistical Region.
