= Čretvež =

- Location in Slovenia
- Coordinates: 46°20′46.47″N 15°22′13.47″E
- Country: Slovenia
- Traditional region: Styria
- Statistical region: Savinja
- Municipality: Zreče

Area
  - Total: 0.75 km^{2} (0.29 sq mi)
- Elevation: 540.3 m (1,773 ft)

Population (2002)
  - Total: 39

Čretvež (pronounced [ˈtʃɾeːtʋɛʃ]) is a small settlement in the Municipality of Zreče in northeastern Slovenia. It lies in the hills south of Zreče and west of Slovenske Konjice. The area is part of the traditional region of Styria. It is now included with the rest of the municipality in the Savinja Statistical Region.

== History ==
Čretvež was administratively separated from Bukovlje in 1998 and made an independent settlement.
