= Križevec =

- Location in Slovenia
- Coordinates: 46°21′40.9″N 15°22′9.63″E
- Country: Slovenia
- Traditional region: Styria
- Statistical region: Savinja
- Municipality: Zreče

Area
  - Total: 1.61 km^{2} (0.62 sq mi)
- Elevation: 442 m (1,450 ft)

Population (2002)
  - Total: 245

Križevec (pronounced [ˈkɾiːʒɛʋəts]) is a settlement in the Municipality of Zreče in northeastern Slovenia. The area is part of the traditional region of Styria. It is now included with the rest of the municipality in the Savinja Statistical Region.
