= Bukovlje, Velika Kladuša =

Bukovlje
- Village
- Location within Bosnia and Herzegovina
- Coordinates: 45.211294°N 15.981760°E
- Country: Bosnia and Herzegovina
- Entity: Federation of Bosnia and Herzegovina
- Canton: Una-Sana
- Municipality: Velika Kladuša

Area
  - Total: 4.23 sq mi (10.95 km^{2})

Population (2013)
  - Total: 17
  - Density: 4.0/sq mi (1.6/km^{2})
- Time zone: UTC+1 (CET)
  - Summer (DST): UTC+2 (CEST)

Bukovlje is a village in the municipality of Velika Kladuša, Bosnia and Herzegovina.

== Demographics ==
According to the 2013 census, its population was 17.

Ethnicity in 2013
Ethnicity	Number	Percentage
Bosniaks	6	35.3%
Serbs	2	11.8%
other/undeclared	9	52.9%
Total	17	100%
