= Bukovlje, Konjic =

Bukovlje Буковље
- Village
- Location within Bosnia and Herzegovina
- Coordinates: 43°47′50″N 17°52′09″E
- Country: Bosnia and Herzegovina
- Entity: Federation of Bosnia and Herzegovina
- Canton: Herzegovina-Neretva
- Municipality: Konjic

Area
  - Total: 2.95 sq mi (7.63 km^{2})

Population (2013)
  - Total: 64
  - Density: 22/sq mi (8.4/km^{2})
- Time zone: UTC+1 (CET)
  - Summer (DST): UTC+2 (CEST)

Bukovlje (Cyrillic: Буковље) is a village in the municipality of Konjic, Bosnia and Herzegovina.

== Demographics ==
According to the 2013 census, its population was 64.

Ethnicity in 2013
Ethnicity	Number	Percentage
Bosniaks	63	98.4%
other/undeclared	1	1.6%
Total	64	100%
