= Gorenje pri Zrečah =

Gorenje pri Zrečah Sveta Kunigunda (until 1955)
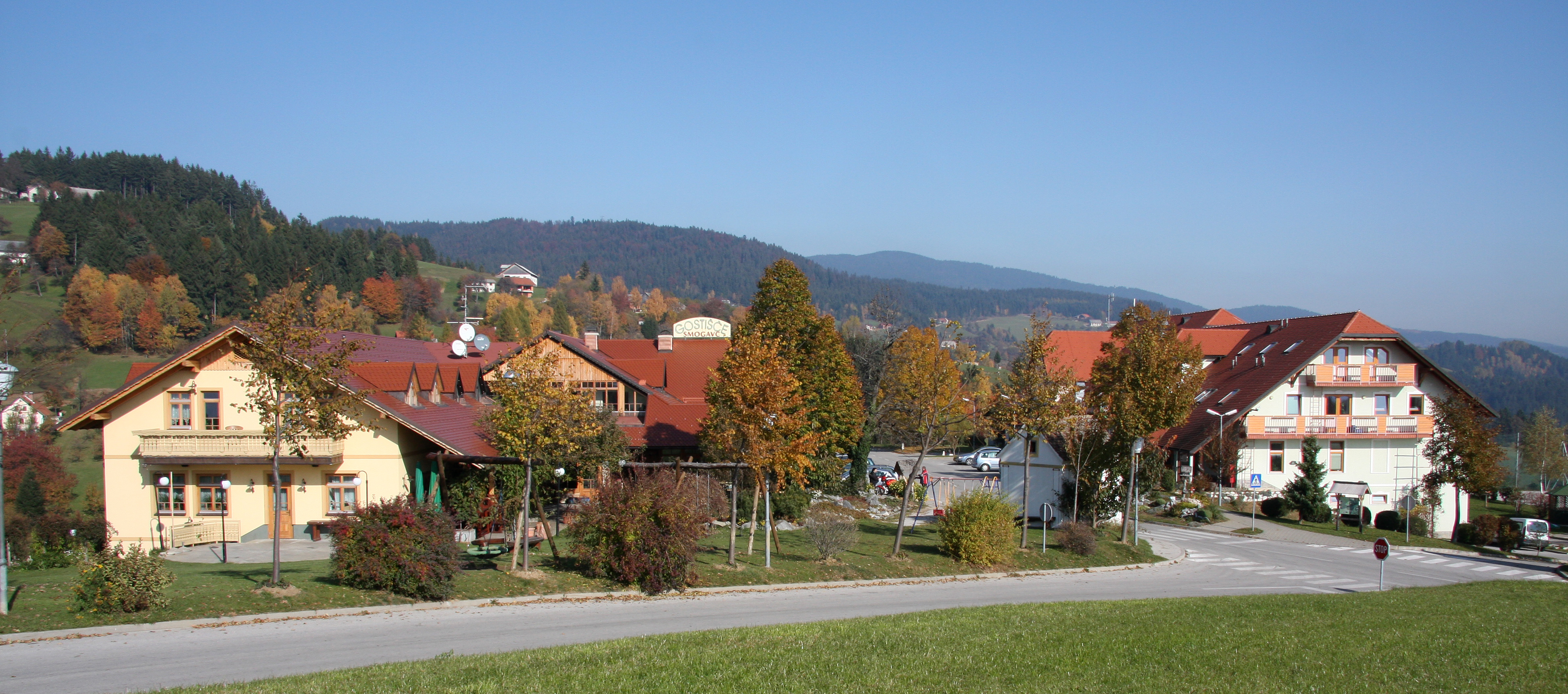

- Location in Slovenia
- Coordinates: 46°24′4.14″N 15°23′23.17″E
- Country: Slovenia
- Traditional region: Styria
- Statistical region: Savinja
- Municipality: Zreče

Area
  - Total: 1.56 km^{2} (0.60 sq mi)
- Elevation: 761.8 m (2,499 ft)

Population (2002)
  - Total: 114
- Climate: Dfb

Gorenje pri Zrečah (pronounced [ɡɔˈɾeːnjɛ pɾi ˈzɾeːtʃax]) is a settlement in the Municipality of Zreče in northeastern Slovenia. The area is part of the traditional region of Styria. It is now included with the rest of the municipality in the Savinja Statistical Region.

== Name ==
The name of the settlement was changed from Sveta Kunigunda (literally, 'Saint Cunigunde') to Gorenje, and then again to Gorenje pri Zrečah in 1955. The name was changed on the basis of the 1948 Law on Names of Settlements and Designations of Squares, Streets, and Buildings as part of efforts by Slovenia's postwar communist government to remove religious elements from toponyms.

== Church ==
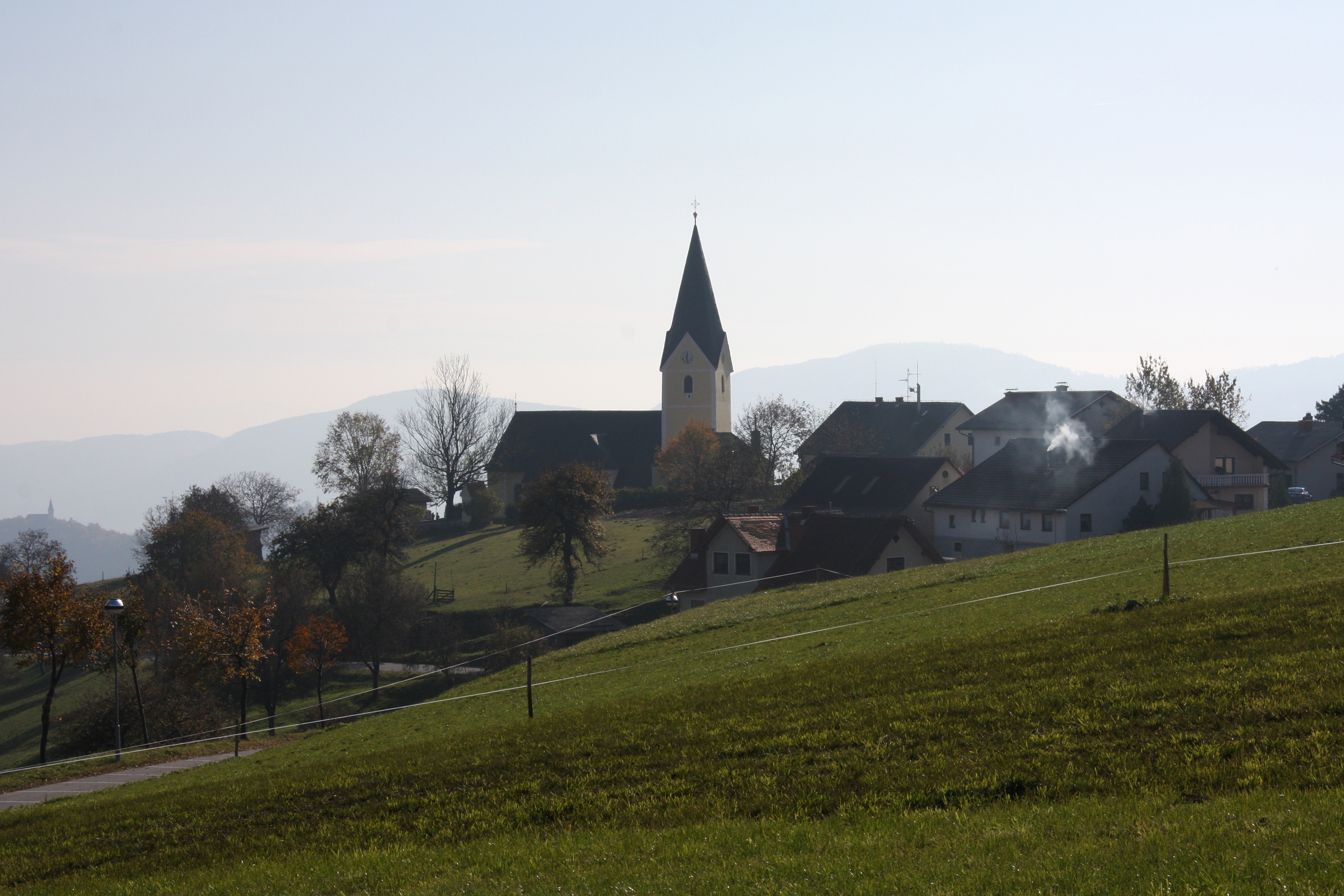
Saint Cunigunde's Church

The local church, dedicated to Saint Cunigunde, is the parish church of the Parish of Saint Cunigunde on Pohorje (Archdiocese of Maribor). It dates to the late 14th century with extensive rebuilding in the 17th century.
