= Bukovlje, Zreče =

Bukovlje Bukovlje pri Stranicah (1953–1998)
- Location in Slovenia
- Coordinates: 46°21′10.16″N 15°21′59.13″E
- Country: Slovenia
- Traditional region: Styria
- Statistical region: Savinja
- Municipality: Zreče

Area
  - Total: 4.6 km^{2} (1.8 sq mi)
- Elevation: 490.8 m (1,610 ft)

Population (2002)
  - Total: 213

Bukovlje (pronounced [buˈkoːu̯ljɛ], in older sources Bukole, German: Wukole) is a settlement in the Municipality of Zreče in northeastern Slovenia. The area is part of the traditional region of Styria. It is now included with the rest of the municipality in the Savinja Statistical Region.

== History ==
Until 1953, the settlement was named Bukovlje. In 1953 it was renamed Bukovlje pri Stranicah In 1998, Čretvež was separated from the settlement and made a village in its own right, and Bukovlje pri Stranicah was renamed back to Bukovlje.
