= Rogla =

Mountain in Slovenia

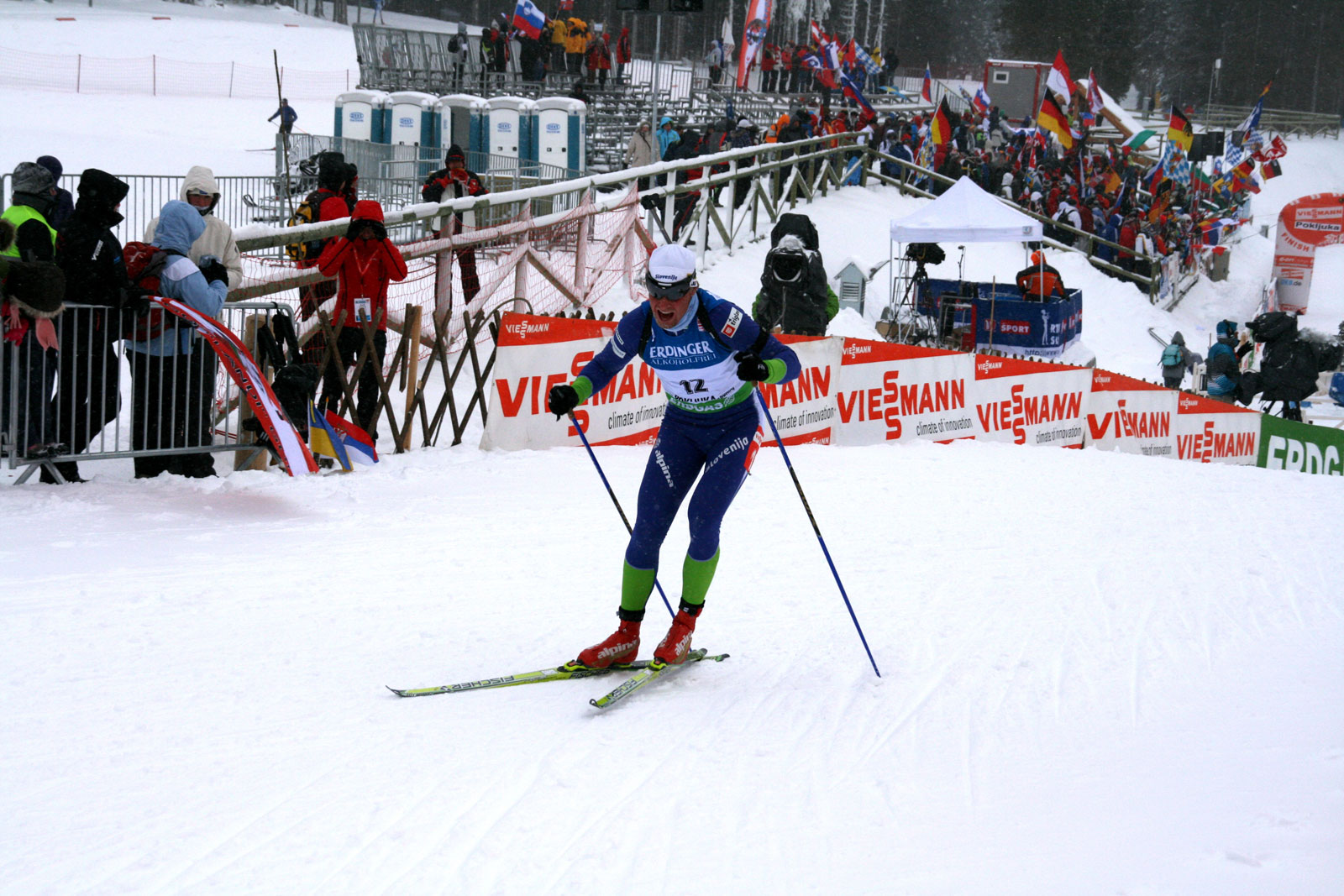
- FIS Cross-Country Skiing World Cup competitions in December 2009

Highest point
- Elevation: 1,517 m (4,977 ft)
- Coordinates: 46°27′9.73″N 15°20′1.59″E

Geography
- Location within Slovenia
- Location: Slovenia
- Parent range: Pohorje

Rogla (pronounced [ˈɾɔːɡla]) is a peak on Zreče Pohorje (Slovene: Zreško Pohorje) in the Municipality of Zreče in northeastern Slovenia. The area is part of the traditional region of Styria. It is now included in the Savinja Statistical Region.

== Name ==
Rogla was attested in written sources in 1763–87 as Vitenska Planina and Wittenska Planina. The Slovene name Rogla is derived from the Slovene common noun rogla 'forked tree-covered mountain ridge', referring to the local topography.

== Tourism ==
Tourism at Zreče Pohorje first appeared before the Second World War. The first wooden observation tower on Rogla was built in 1934. Most tourist buildings were burnt down during the war. The hut on Rogla was rebuilt in 1956. It was managed by the Zreče hiking club until 1972, when it was taken over and renovated by the Unior company. In 1974, Unior's management commissioned studies for the development of Rogla as a ski resort. The road leading to the peak was also widened. The first ski lifts were built and could handle up to 900 skiers per hour.

The idea was to develop Rogla together with other tourist centres on Pohorje to offer a complete package with skiing, the spa resort at Zreče, and agrotourism in the area. Thus in 1978 construction began on Hotel Dobrava in Zreče and Hotel Planja on Rogla. Hotel Planja opened in 1980 together with new ski lifts. In 1981, Hotel Dobrava with 70 beds, a swimming pool, and a new athletics-football stadium was completed.

By the 1990s Rogla had a capacity of over 1,200 beds and ski lifts handling 12,200 skiers per hour. A new Hotel Dobrava with 160 beds was opened in 2000 and between 2002 and 2004 four new chairlifts were constructed and artificial snow systems extended, making Rogla one of the ski centres in Slovenia with the best snow conditions and the longest ski season.

Today there are 13 slopes available for all levels of skiers.

== Sources ==
- Brečko, Andraž. Thesis: Turizem in informacijska tehnologija, primer Unior d.d. program turizem. Ljubljana 2004 (in Slovene)

== See also ==
- Rogla Ski Resort
