= Stranice =

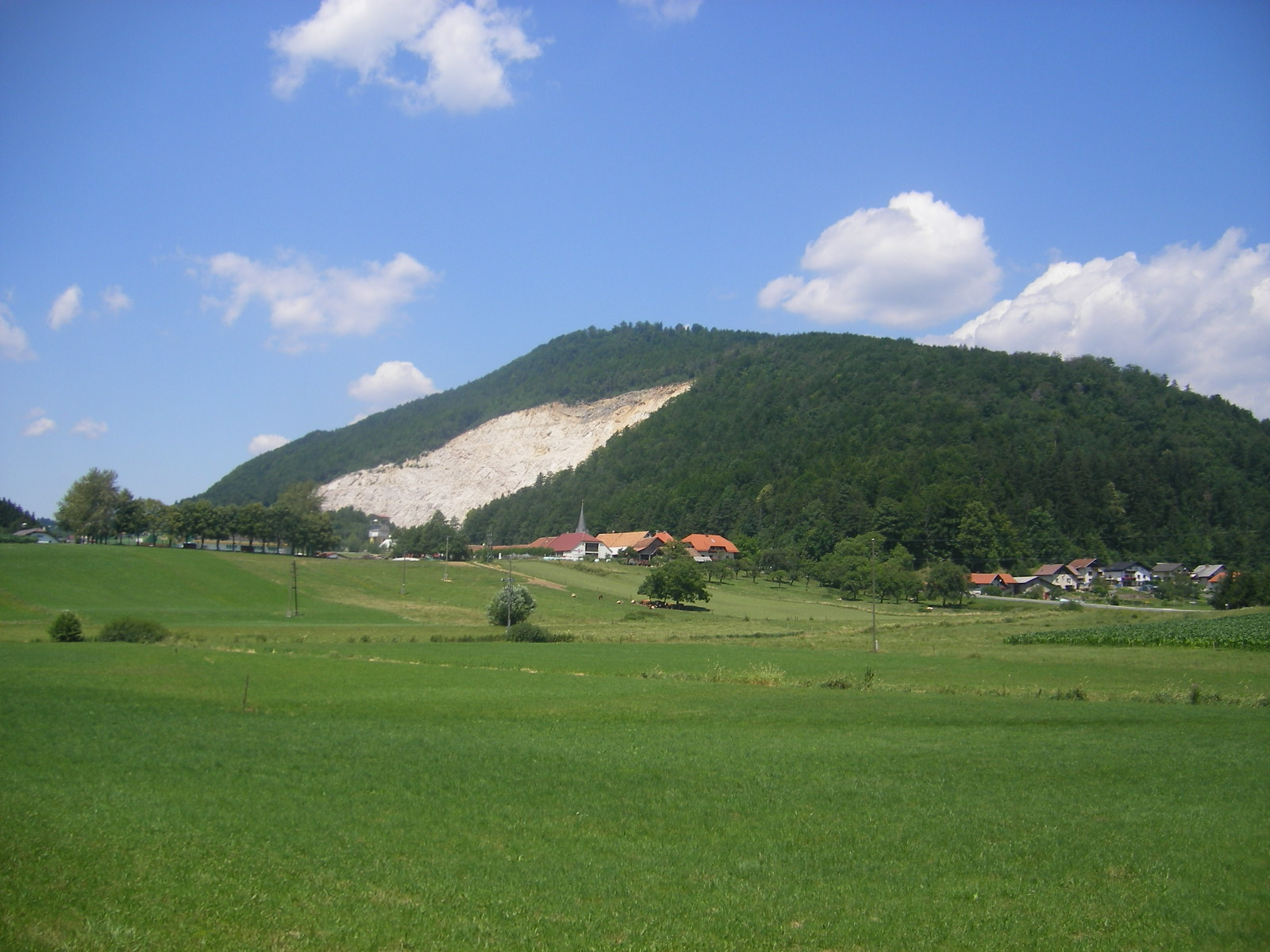

- Location in Slovenia
- Coordinates: 46°21′48.72″N 15°21′56.12″E
- Country: Slovenia
- Traditional region: Styria
- Statistical region: Savinja
- Municipality: Zreče

Area
  - Total: 1.3 km^{2} (0.50 sq mi)
- Elevation: 446.6 m (1,465 ft)

Population (2002)
  - Total: 193
- Climate: Cfb

Stranice (pronounced [stɾaˈniːtsɛ]) is a settlement in the Municipality of Zreče in northeastern Slovenia. The area is part of the traditional region of Styria. It is now included with the rest of the municipality in the Savinja Statistical Region.

== Mass grave ==
Stranice is the site of a mass grave from the period immediately after the Second World War. The Cemetery Mass Grave (Slovene: Grobišče pri pokopališču) lies on the eastern perimeter of the village cemetery. It contains the remains of 84 Croatian soldiers and civilians that were murdered at a nearby quarry in May 1945 as well as about 50 Slovene civilians from Slovenske Konjice that were murdered in the Lisica Woods in July 1945.

== Church ==
The parish church in the village is dedicated to Saint Lawrence and belongs to the Roman Catholic Archdiocese of Maribor. It dates to the 16th century with numerous rebuildings and expansions in the following centuries.
