= Zreče =

- Town
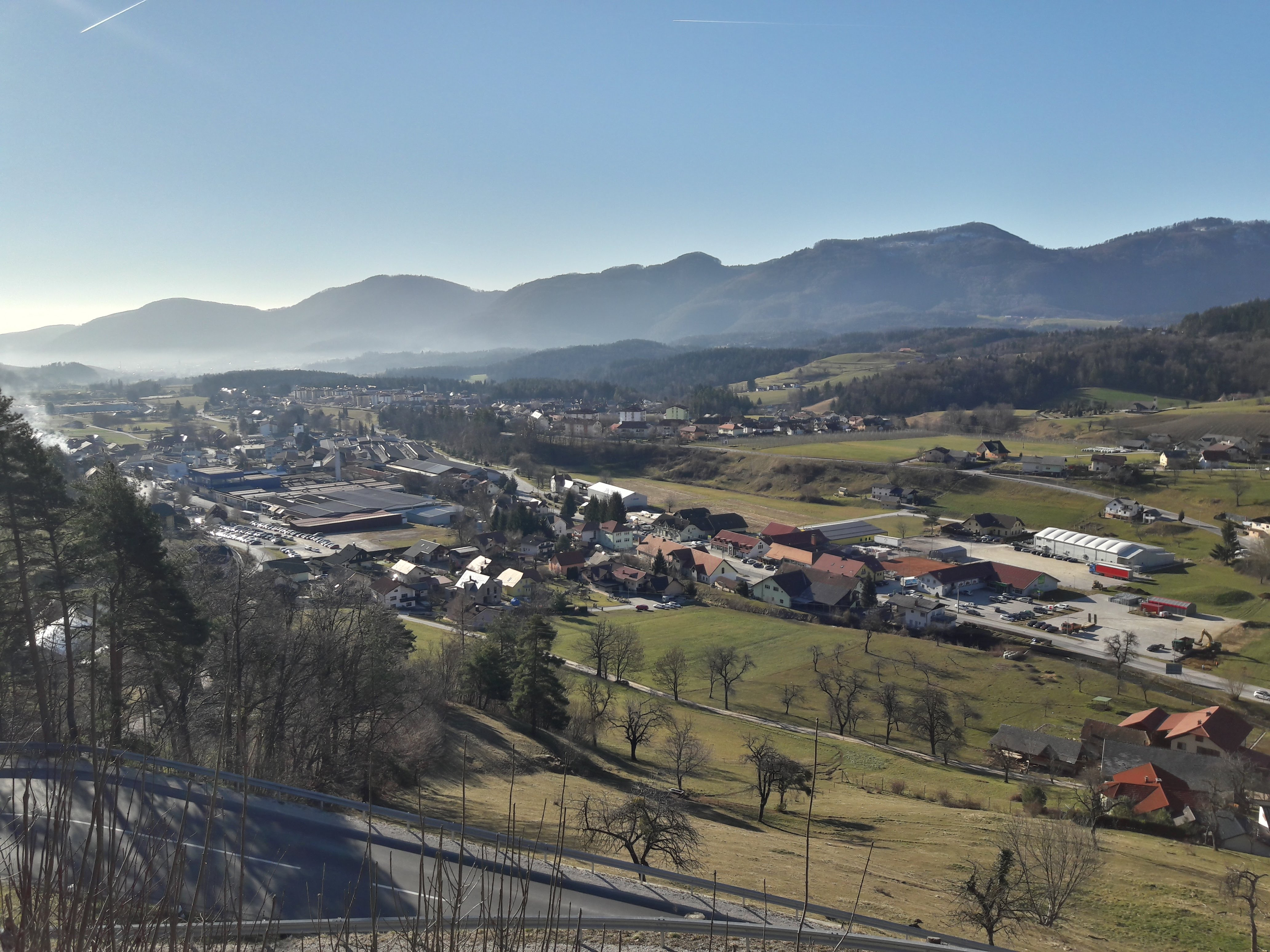
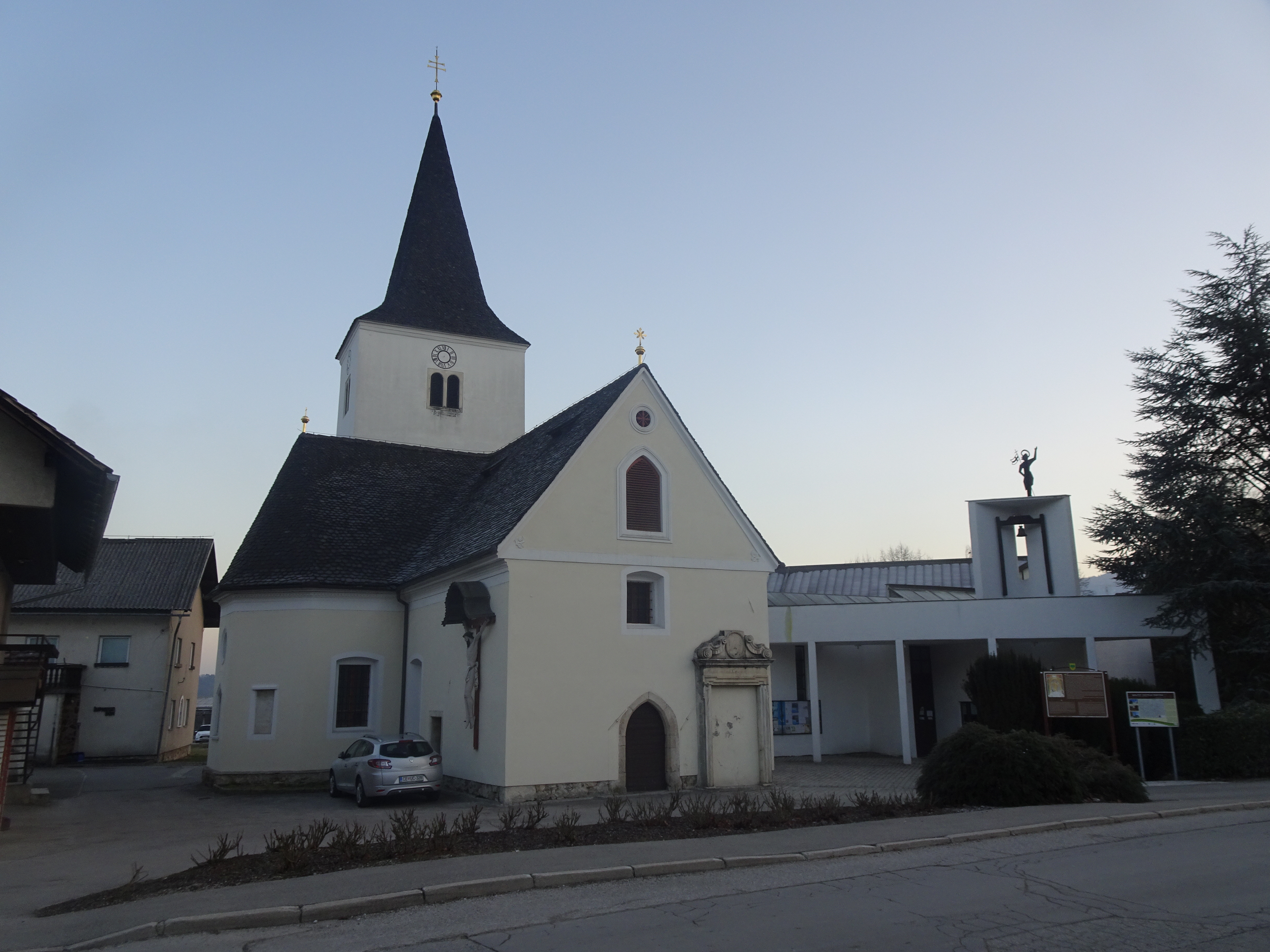
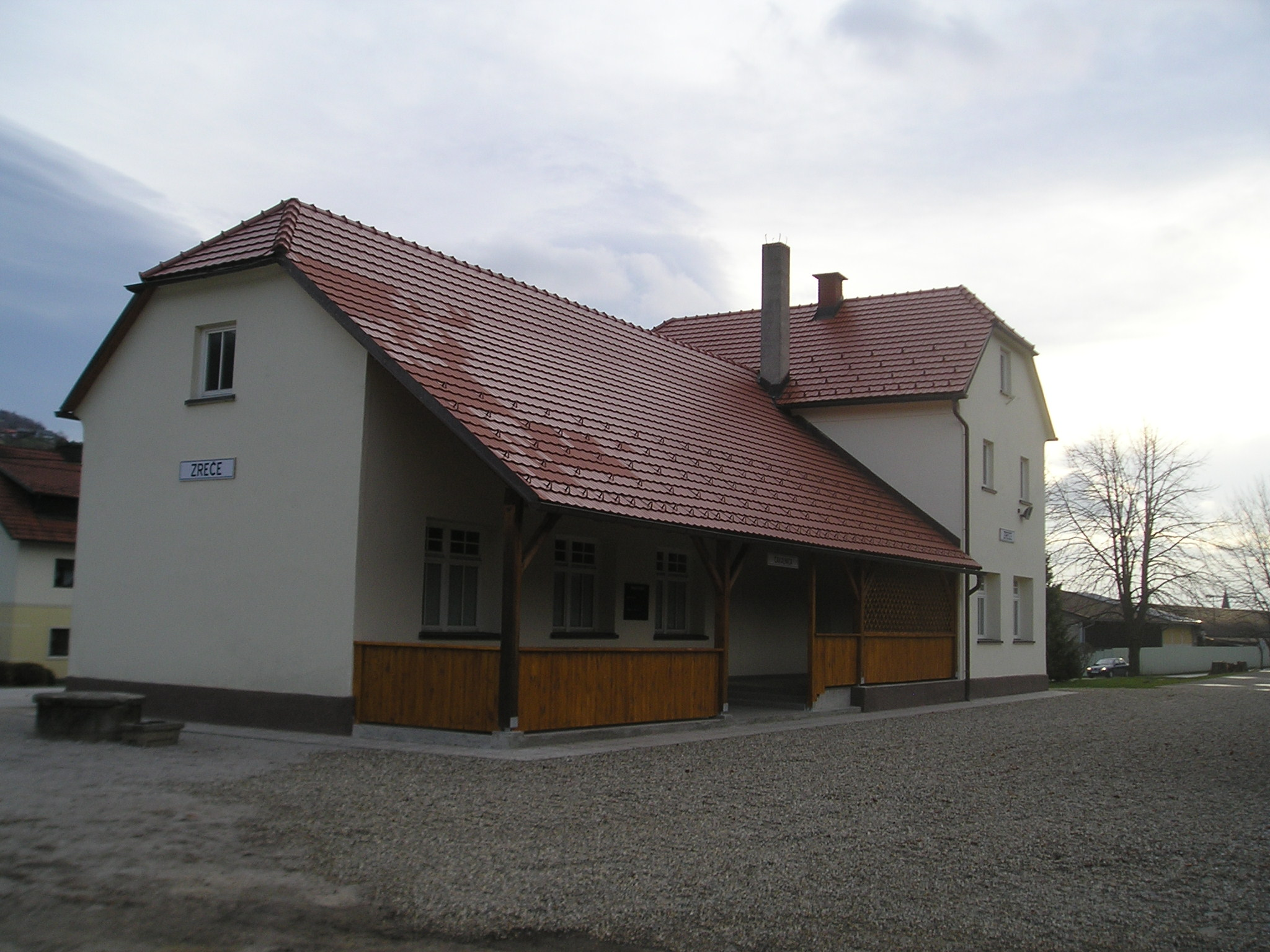
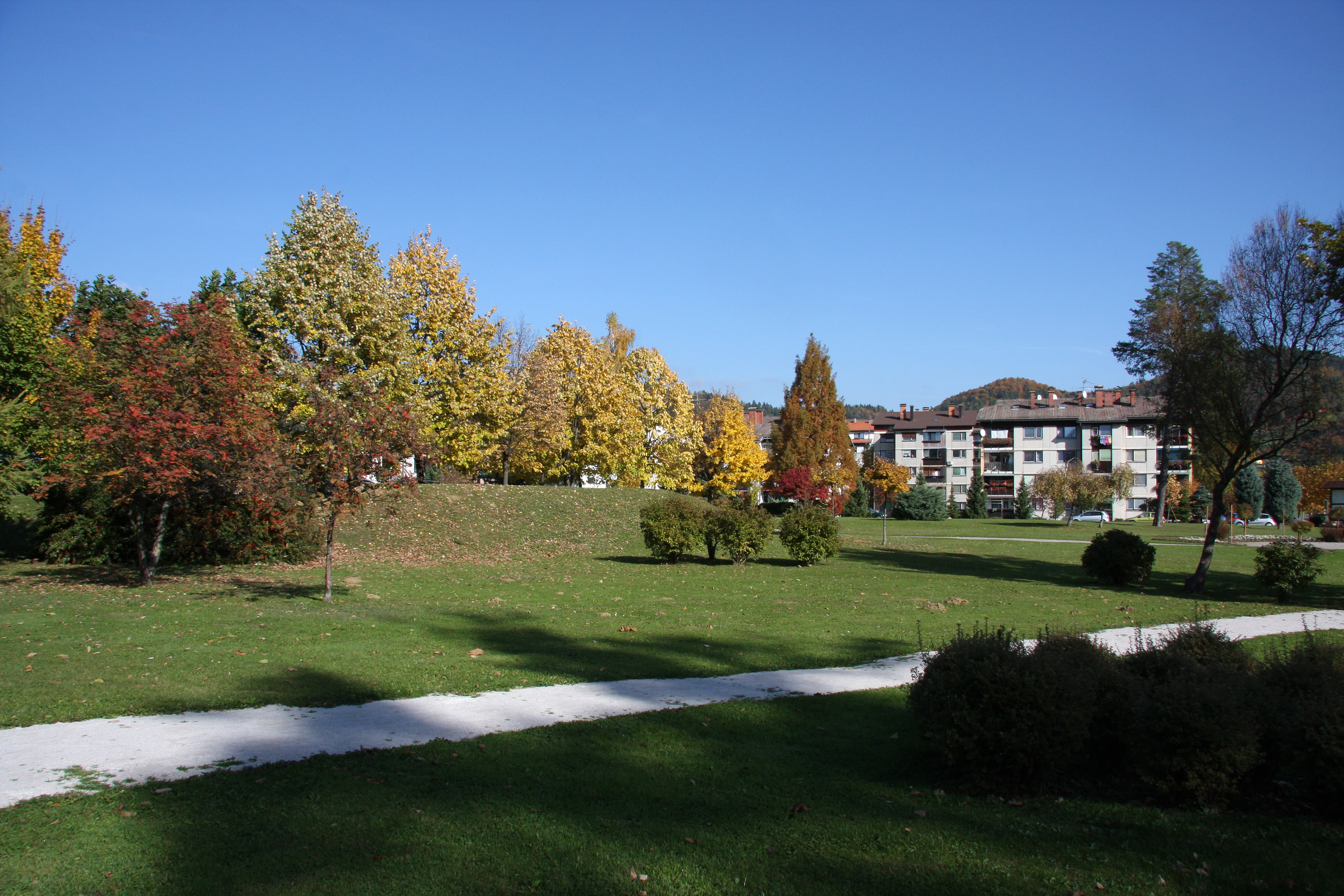
- From top, left to right: Overview of Zreče, St. Giles and Risen Savior Churches, Former Railway Station, Park

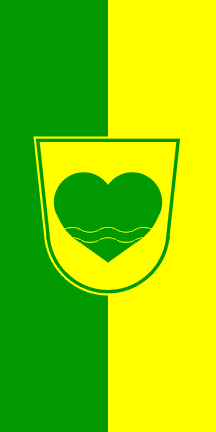
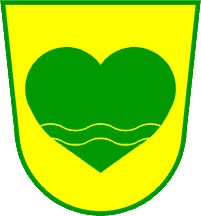
- Flag Coat of arms

- Location in Slovenia
- Coordinates: 46°22′30″N 15°23′7″E
- Country: Slovenia
- Traditional region: Styria
- Statistical region: Savinja
- Municipality: Zreče

Area
  - Total: 2.17 km^{2} (0.84 sq mi)
- Elevation: 396.4 m (1,301 ft)

Population (2018)
  - Total: 2,922
- Climate: Dfb

Zreče (pronounced [ˈzɾèːtʃɛ]; German: Rötschach bei Gonobitz) is a town in northeast Slovenia and is the seat of the Municipality of Zreče. It lies on the slopes of Pohorje in the upper valley of the Dravinja River. The area is part of the traditional region of Styria. It is now included in the Savinja Statistical Region. The economy is centred on tourism, especially in the winter months with the ski resort at Rogla. A proportion of the population is also employed in agriculture. Its main businesses are the tool and car parts manufacturer Unior, the manufacturer Weiler Abrasives, and the tourism spa company Unitur.

== Geography ==
Zreče is located 100 kilometres (62 miles) northeast of Ljubljana, 42 km (26 mi) from Maribor, 25 km (16 mi) from Celje and 4 km (2 mi) from Slovenske Konjice.

== History ==
Archaeological evidence from the area has pointed to Neolithic settlement of the area. The earliest written sources date to the end of the 10th century, when the area was divided into a number of ecclesiastical and secular domains.

Zreče became a single settlement in 1987, when the villages of Zgornje Zreče (German: Oberrötschach or Oberretschach), Spodnje Zreče (German: Unterrötschach or Unterretschach), and Nova Dobrava (known as Dobrava until 1953) were united.

Historical population
| Year | Pop. | ±% |
|---|---|---|
| 1948 | 1,048 | — |
| 1953 | 1,163 | +11.0% |
| 1961 | 1,407 | +21.0% |
| 1971 | 1,682 | +19.5% |
| 1981 | 2,455 | +46.0% |
| 1991 | 2,966 | +20.8% |
| 2002 | 2,895 | −2.4% |
| 2011 | 2,935 | +1.4% |
| 2021 | 2,998 | +2.1% |
Until 1971 counts the villages of (Nova) Dobrava, Spodnje Zreče and Zgornje Zreče

== Church ==
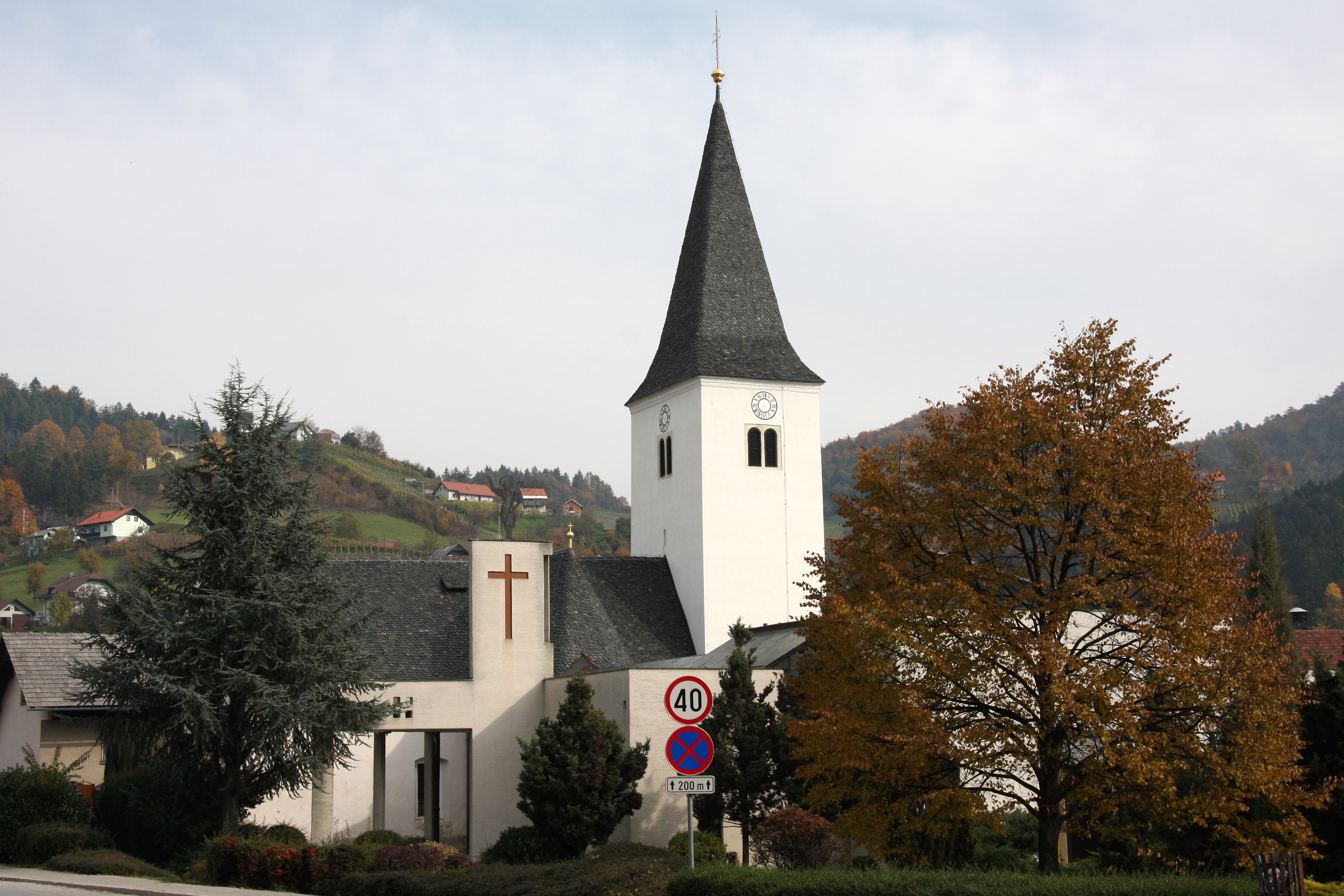
St. Giles's Parish Church in Zreče

The parish church in the settlement is dedicated to Saint Giles (Slovene: Sveti Egidij) and belongs to the Roman Catholic Archdiocese of Maribor. It dates to the 14th century with 18th and 19th century side chapels. Two churches on Mount Juniper (Brinjeva Gora) to the east of the settlement belong to the same parish. They are dedicated to Saint Agnes (Slovene: Sveta Neža), built between 1726 and 1732, and to the Virgin Mary, built in 1769.

== Tourism ==
The Rogla ski and health resort has become increasingly important to the local economy through tourism, which employs around half of the population. There are many hotels, self-catering units, holiday houses, and villas in the area and gymnasiums, health clinics, saunas, and massage parlors. The Rogla resort is most active from the beginning of December through mid March and has 13 slopes for skiers of all abilities.

Tourism at Zreče Pohorje (Slovene: Zreško Pohorje) began to develop before the Second World War. The first observation tower on Rogla was built in 1934. Many of the tourist facilities were destroyed during the war. The Koča Lodge on Rogla was rebuilt in 1956. It was managed by the Zreče mountaineering society until 1972, when it was taken over and renovated by Unior, a local company that produces hand tools. The company has become one of the biggest companies on its field in Europe and its management has had a continued interest in the development of all of Zreče and the Rogla area. In 1974 Unior's management commissioned studies for the development of Rogla as a ski resort. The road leading to the peak was also widened. The first ski lifts handling up to 900 skiers per hour were built.

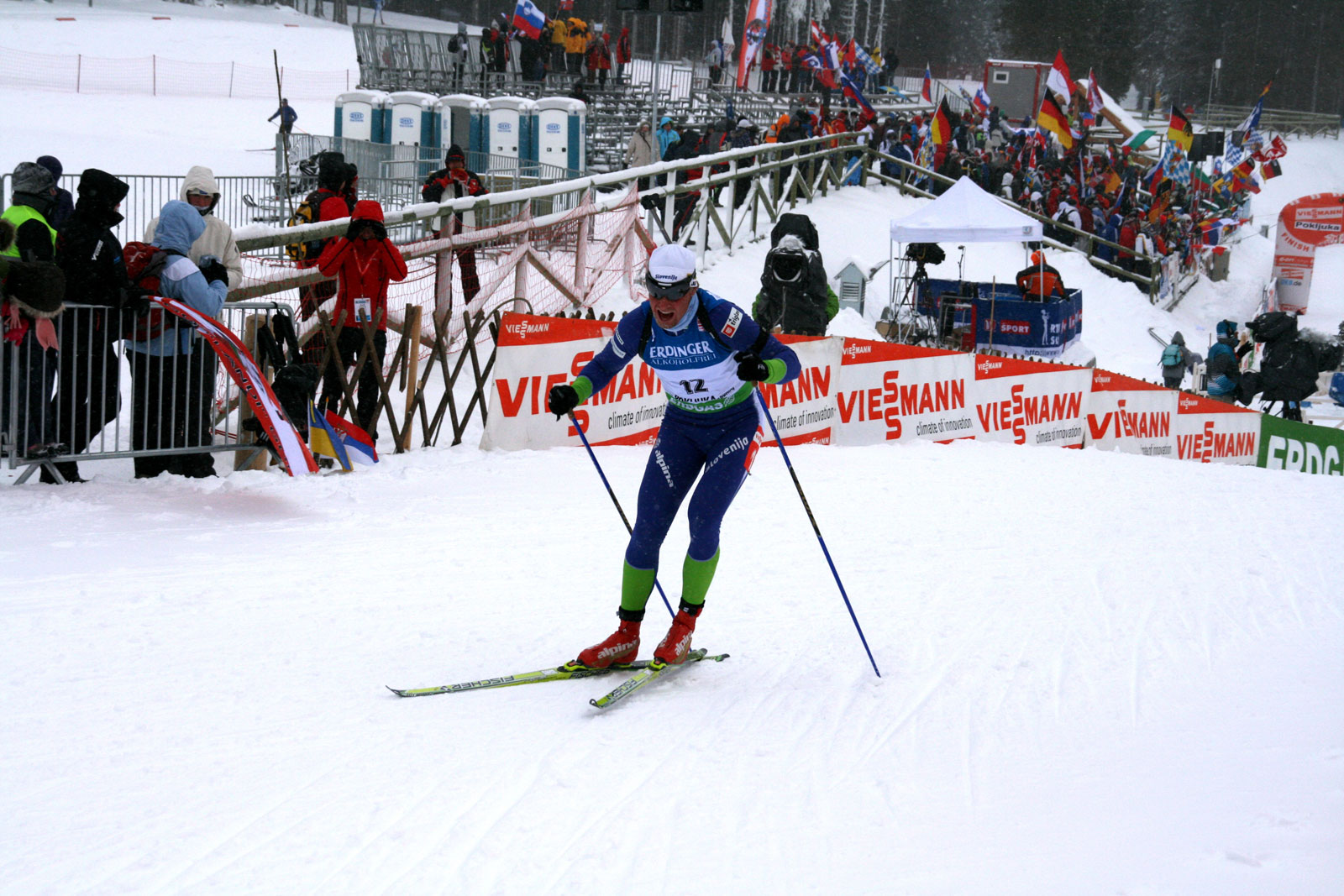
Rogla cross country skiing world cup 2009

The idea was to develop Rogla together with other tourist centres on Pohorje to offer a complete package with skiing, the spa resort at Zreče and agrotourism in the area. Thus in 1978 construction began on Hotel Dobrava in Zreče and of Hotel Planja on Rogla. Hotel Planja opened in 1980 with new ski lifts. In 1981 the Dobrava Hotel with 70 beds, a swimming pool, and a new athletics-football stadium was completed. By the 1990s Rogla had a capacity of over 1,200 beds and ski lifts handling 12,200 skiers per hour. A new Dobrava Hotel with 160 new beds was opened in 2000 and between 2002 and 2004 four new chairlifts were constructed and artificial snow systems extended, making Rogla one of the ski centres in Slovenia with the best snow conditions and the longest ski season.

In 2005, the town was twinned with Sedbergh in Cumbria, UK. The efforts of Sedbergh to find a twin town were featured in a BBC documentary, The Town That Wants A Twin and Zreče was the winning town.

== Notable people ==
- Marijan Osole (1924–2015) general manager of Unior (1968–1992), the founding father of the town of Zreče in its present form

== Twin towns ==
- (United Kingdom) Sedbergh, (since 2005)
