= Paka =

Paka may refer to:

== Places ==
=== Europe ===
- Paka (river), a river in northern Slovenia
- Paka, Mislinja, a settlement in the Municipality of Mislinja, Slovenia
- Paka pri Predgradu, a settlement in the Municipality of Kočevje, Slovenia
- Paka pri Velenju, a settlement in the Municipality of Velenje, Slovenia
- Paka, Dobrepolje, a settlement in the Municipality of Dobrepolje, Slovenia
- Paka, Vitanje, a settlement in the Municipality of Vitanje, Slovenia
- Páka in Zala County, Hungary
- Paka, Požega-Slavonia County, a village in Croatia
- Paka, Varaždin County, a village in Croatia
- Päka, a village in Põlva County in southeastern Estonia
- Paka (state constituency), state constituency in Malaysia

=== Elsewhere ===
- Paka, Malaysia, a town in Malaysia
  - Paka (state constituency)
- Paca (mountain), Peru
- Paka (volcano), a volcano in Kenya
- Typhoon Paka, a 1997's cyclone in the Pacific Ocean

== See also ==
- Paka (River of Blood), an Indian Malayalam-language film
- Paka'a, god of the wind and the inventor of the sail in Hawaiian mythology
- Paca (disambiguation)
