= Mislinja =

Mislinja may refer to:

- Mislinja (settlement), a settlement in northern Slovenia, the seat of the Municipality of Mislinja
- Municipality of Mislinja, a municipality in northern Slovenia
- Mislinja (river), a river in northern Slovenia
