= Gornji Dolič =

Gornji Dolič Zgornji Dolič (until WWII)
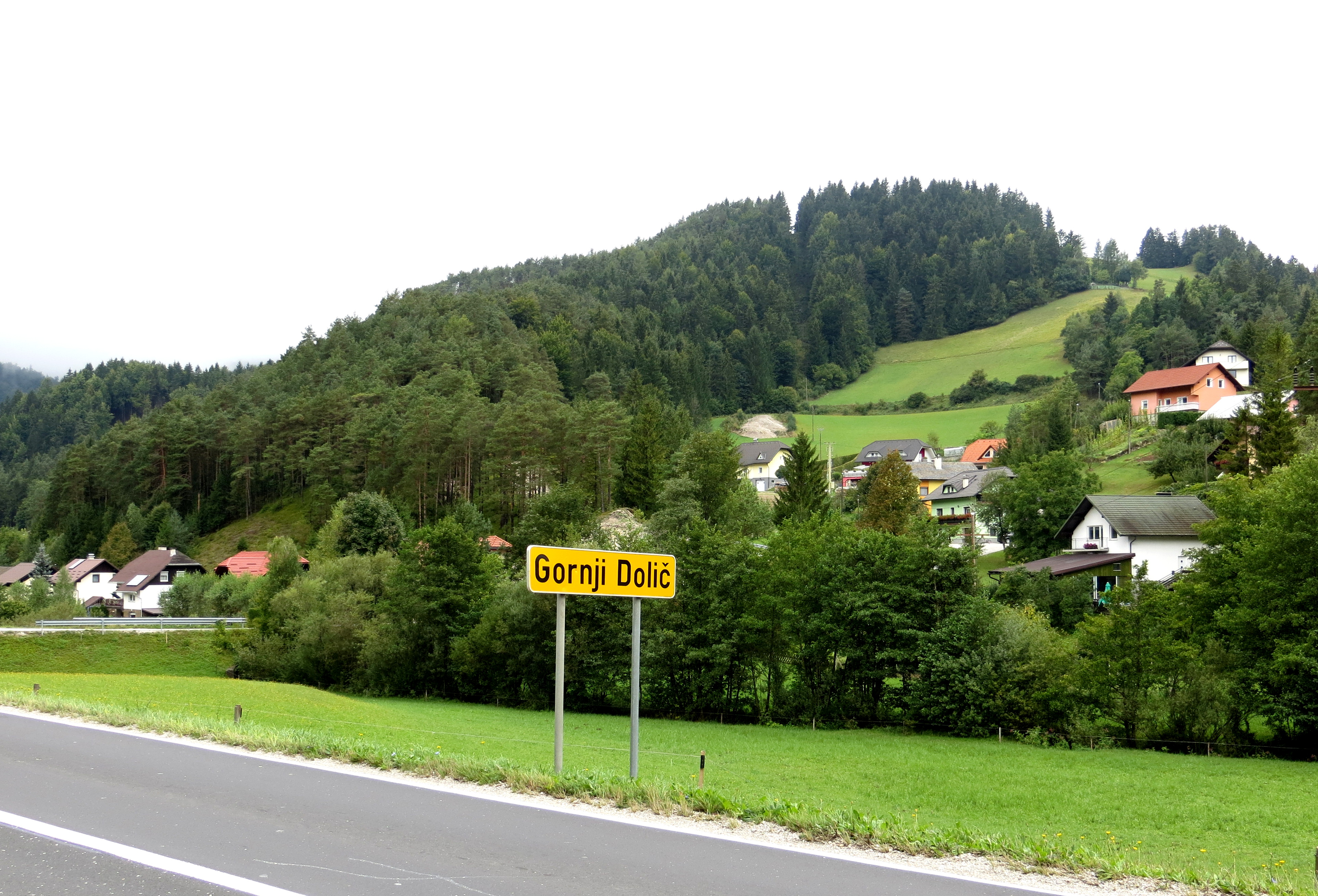

- Location in Slovenia
- Coordinates: 46°25′18.34″N 15°11′41.17″E
- Country: Slovenia
- Traditional region: Carinthia
- Statistical region: Carinthia
- Municipality: Mislinja

Area
  - Total: 4.36 km^{2} (1.68 sq mi)
- Elevation: 537.1 m (1,762 ft)

Population (2002)
  - Total: 520

Gornji Dolič (pronounced [ˈɡoːɾnji ˈdɔːlitʃ] or [ˈɡoːɾnji ˈdoːlitʃ]; formerly and locally also Zgornji Dolič, German: Oberdollitsch) is a village in the Municipality of Mislinja in northern Slovenia. The area is part of the traditional region of Carinthia and is now included in the Carinthia Statistical Region.

== Geography ==
Gornji Dolič is a sprawling settlement in hilly terrain in the western part of the Dolič Lowland (Slovene: Doliško podolje) between the Pohorje Mountains to the north and the Paka Mount Kozjak (Slovene: Paški Kozjak) to the south. It lies along the main road from Slovenj Gradec to Vitanje and includes the hamlets and isolated farms of Cvetržnik, Globočnik, Golčman, Grmič, Hof, Interbožnik, Pantner, Potočnik, Pušnik, and Vodovšek. Surrounding elevations include Pečovnik Peak (Slovene: Pečovnikov vrh; 794 meters or 2,605 feet) and Pantner Peak (Slovene: Pantnerjev vrh; 853 meters or 2,799 feet) to the south, and Tičler Peak (Slovene: Tičlerjev vrh; 686 meters or 2,251 feet) to the northeast. The Paka River flows through the settlement. There are meadows in the low-lying areas. There is shallow sandy soil on the hillsides, which is vulnerable to droughts. The hills are covered in mixed pine and beech woods, with interspersed isolated farms.

== Name ==
The name Gornji Dolič (literally, 'upper Dolič') distinguishes the village from Srednji Dolič (literally, 'middle Dolič') and Spodnji Dolič (literally, 'lower Dolič') . The name dates from the time before what is now the main road was built through the Bad Hole Gorge (Slovene: Huda lukjna). Along the original road from Slovenj Gradec to Vitanje, which passed near Turjak Hill (800 meters or 2,600 feet), it was the highest of the three villages—but today's village center is in fact some 40 meters (130 ft) lower in elevation than the other two villages. The village was known as Zgornji Dolič in Slovene until the Second World War, and it was named Oberdollitsch in German in the past.

== Second World War ==
Gornji Dolič was heavily involved in the Second World War. On 1 December 1941 saboteurs dynamited the railroad bridge between Paka pri Velenju and the Bad Hole Gorge (Slovene: Huda luknja). The Navršnik farm in the settlement was a center of Partisan resistance. Partisan forces dynamited the railway on 31 September 1942, burned the railway station in the settlement on 27 October 1942, attacked and destroyed the railway station again at the end of March 1944, derailed a train into the Huda Luknja Gorge on 10 April 1944, sent a burning train towards Velenje on 25 April 1944 and burned the bus station the same day, burned another train on 26 April 1944, attached a German post in the Huda Luknja Gorge on 3 June 1944, and destroyed the railroad bridge on 18 June 1944 and dynamited the railroad tunnel the same day. Between 12 and 14 May 1945 there was heavy fighting between Mislinja and the Huda Luknja Gorge, resulting in several hundred deaths.

=== Mass graves ===
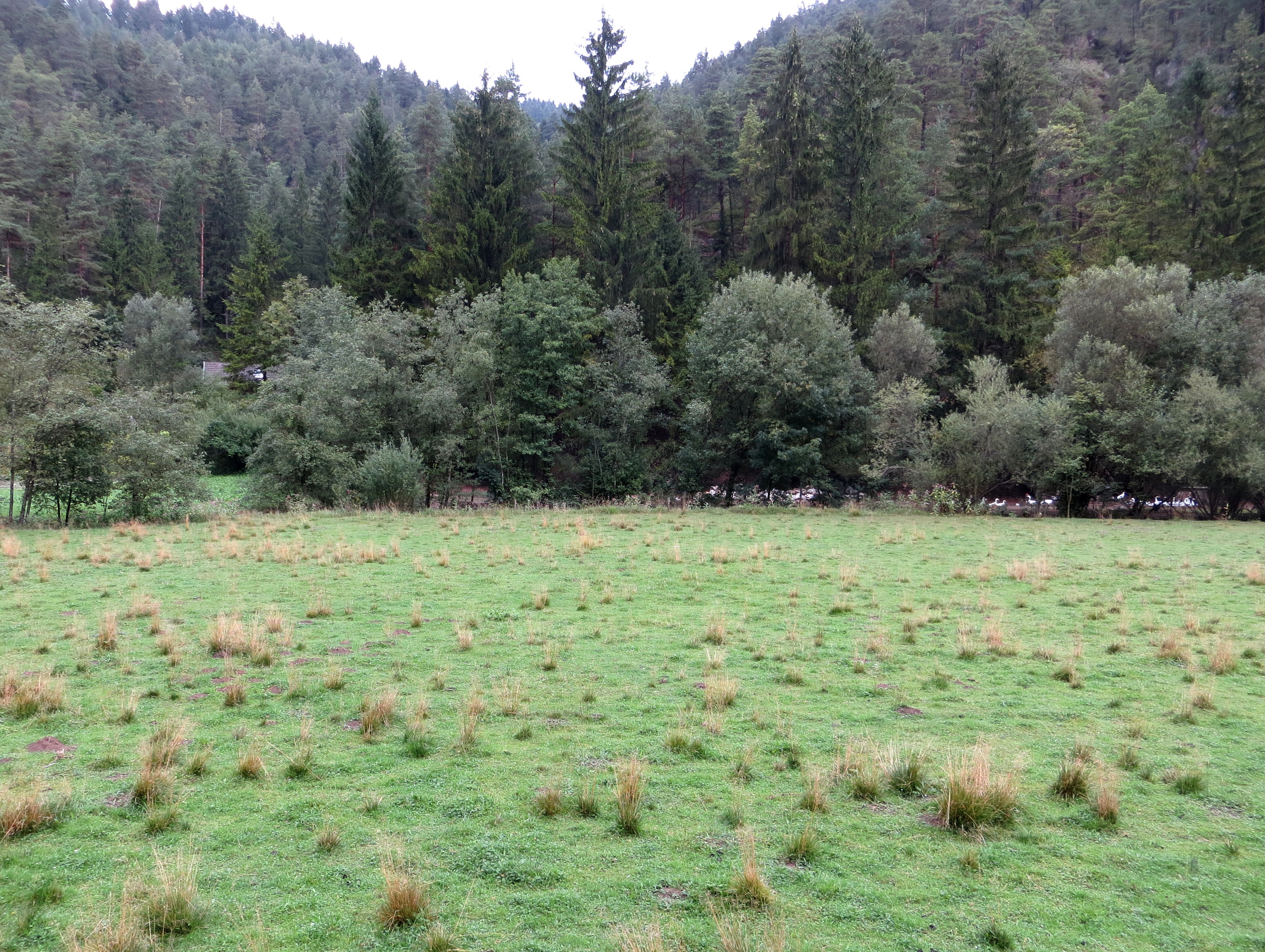
Gornji Dolič 1 Mass Grave

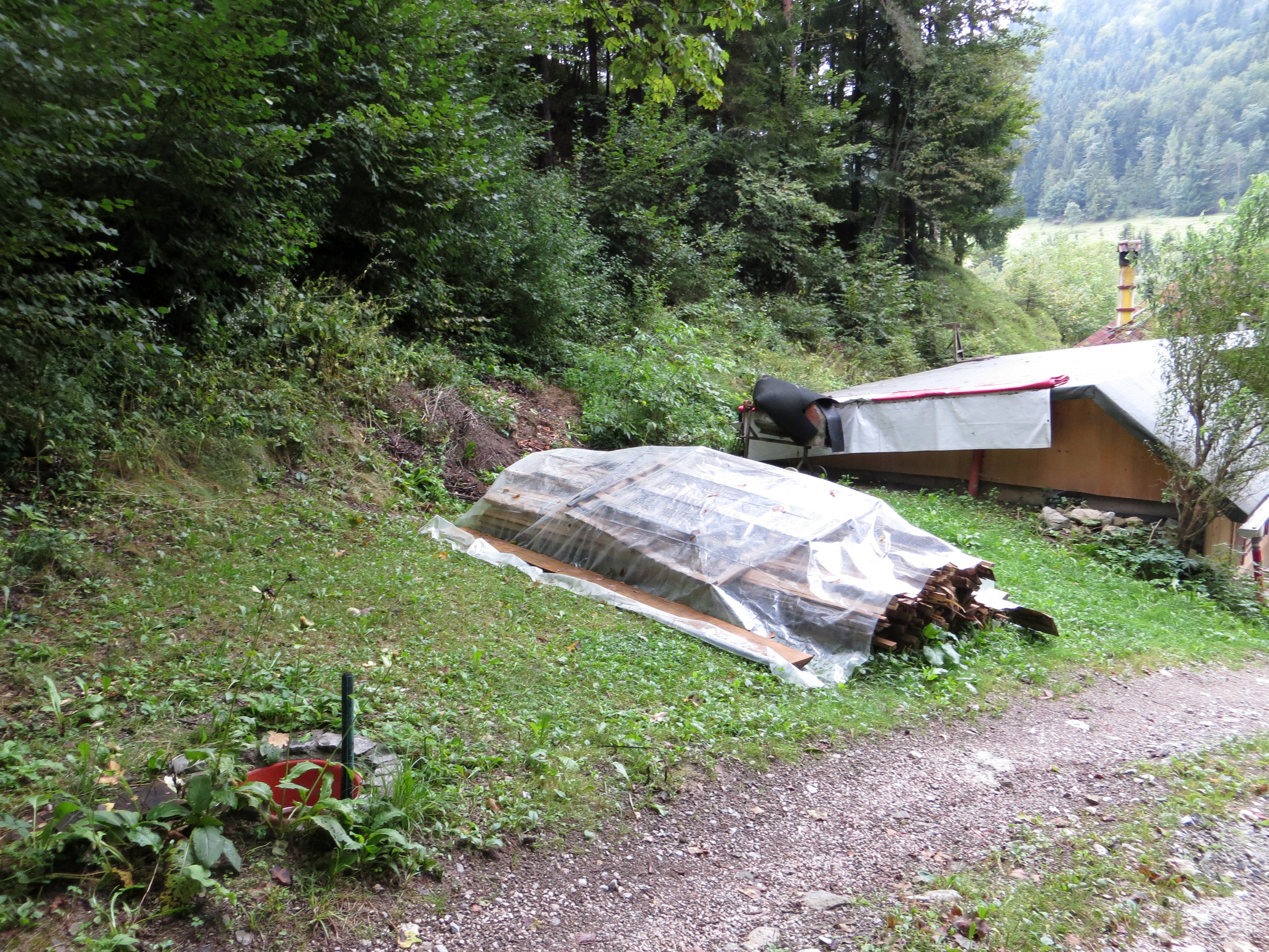
Krajcer Farm Mass Grave

Mass graves in Gornji Dolič

Gornji Dolič is the site of seven known mass graves from the period immediately after the Second World War. The Kozjak Road Mass Grave (Slovene: Grobišče ob cesti na Kozjak) is located along Glažarica Creek, 150 meters (490 ft) north of the house at Kozjak no. 68. It contains the remains of 10 to 20 Croatian soldiers killed between 10 and 15 May 1945. The Naveršnik Farm Mass Grave (Grobišče pri domačiji Naveršnik) is located about 10 meters (33 ft) north of an outbuilding at the Naveršnik farm (Gornji Dolič no. 45), in a ravine on the edge of the woods. It contains the remains of an unknown number of civilian victims murdered between 10 and 15 May 1945. The Golčman Farm Mass Grave (Grobišče pri domačiji Golčman) lies in a meadow below the Golčman farm (Gornji Dolič no. 54), below a cliff at the edge of the woods. It contains the remains of three Croatian soldiers killed between 10 and 15 May 1945. The Krajcer Farm Mass Grave (Grobišče pri domačiji Krajcer), also known as the Teržan Farm Mass Grave (Grobišče pri domačiji Teržan), is located near a shed on the Krajcer farm (Gornji Dolič no. 64a). It contains the remains of an unknown number of Croatian soldiers killed between 10 and 15 May 1945. The Gornji Dolič 1, 2, and 3 mass graves (Grobišče Gornji Dolič 1, 2, 3) are located southwest of the settlement and contain the remains of 80 to 100 Croatian soldiers killed and civilians murdered between 12 and 14 May 1945. The Gornji Dolič 1 Mass Grave is located southeast of the Vocovnik farm (Završe no. 88), between the road, a spruce grove, and the Paka River. The Gornji Dolič 2 and 3 mass graves are located between the road from Velenje to Slovenj Gradec and the right and left banks of the Paka River, south of the Turenšek farmhouse at Gornji Dolič no. 72.

== Church ==
The local parish church is dedicated to Saint Florian and belongs to the Roman Catholic Archdiocese of Maribor. It dates to around 1792 with 19th- and 20th-century additions.
