= Dolič =

Dolič is a Slovene place name that may refer to:

- Dolič Pass, a mountain pass in the Julian Alps west of Mount Triglav, northwestern Slovenia

Settlements

- Dolič, Destrnik, a village in the Municipality of Destrnik, northeastern Slovenia
- Dolič, Kuzma, a village in the Municipality of Kuzma, northeastern Slovenia
- Gornji Dolič, a village in the Municipality of Mislinja, northern Slovenia
- Spodnji Dolič, a village in the Municipality of Vitanje, northeastern Slovenia
