= Paca (disambiguation) =

A paca is a rodent in South and Central America.

Paca or PACA may also refer to:

== People ==
- William Paca (1740–1799), a Founding Father of the United States
- Paca Blanco (Francisca Blanco Díaz, born 1949), Spanish activist
- Paca Navas (Francisca Raquel Navas Gardela, 1883–1971), Honduran journalist
- Paca Thomas, American entertainment media producer

== Places ==
- Pača, Slovakia
- Paca, Tibet
- Paca District, Jauja, Peru
- Paca (mountain), Peru
- Lake Paca, Peru
- La Paca, Murcia, Spain, a village
- Provence-Alpes-Côte d'Azur, a region of France

== Other uses ==
- Perishable Agricultural Commodities Act of 1930, United States legislation
- Pan American Christian Academy, a school in São Paulo, Brazil
- Portslade Aldridge Community Academy, a school in England

== See also ==
- Professional Amigos of Comic Art Society
- Paka (disambiguation)
- Alpaca (disambiguation)
