= Vitanje Vas =

- Location in Slovenia
- Coordinates: 46°23′00″N 15°17′50″E
- Country: Slovenia
- Traditional region: Styria
- Statistical region: Savinja
- Municipality: Vitanje
- Elevation: 478 m (1,568 ft)

Vitanje Vas (pronounced [ˈʋiːtanjɛ ˈʋaːs]; Slovene: Vitanje vas, also Vitanja vas or Vitanjska vas, German: Dorf Weitenstein) is a former settlement in the Municipality of Vitanje in northeastern Slovenia. It is now part of the town of Vitanje. The area is part of the traditional region of Styria. The municipality is now included in the Savinja Statistical Region.

== Geography ==
Vitanje Vas lies in the northern part of Vitanje, separated from the main part of the town by the Hudinja River. It is the older part of the now-combined town. Jesenica Creek runs to the west of the settlement and Hočna Creek to the east; both are tributaries of the Hudinja. The street name Na vasi (literally, 'in the village') in the settlement mirrors its name.

== History ==
Vitanje Vas was merged with the main settlement of Vitanje Trg in 1953 to create the combined settlement of Vitanje.

== Cultural heritage ==
The parish church in Vitanje stands in Vitanje Vas.
