= Mala Mislinja =

- Location in Slovenia
- Coordinates: 46°28′0.06″N 15°12′17.37″E
- Country: Slovenia
- Traditional region: Carinthia
- Statistical region: Carinthia
- Municipality: Mislinja

Area
  - Total: 8.47 km^{2} (3.27 sq mi)
- Elevation: 1,057.5 m (3,469 ft)

Population (2002)
  - Total: 190

Mala Mislinja (pronounced [ˈmaːla miˈsliːnja]) is a dispersed settlement in the hills north of Mislinja in northern Slovenia. The area is part of the traditional region of Carinthia. The entire Municipality of Mislinja is now included in the Carinthia Statistical Region.
