= Kozjak, Mislinja =

Kozjak
- Location in Slovenia
- Coordinates: 46°24′18.27″N 15°11′30.18″E
- Country: Slovenia
- Traditional region: Carinthia
- Statistical region: Carinthia
- Municipality: Mislinja

Area
  - Total: 12.75 km^{2} (4.92 sq mi)
- Elevation: 762 m (2,500 ft)

Population (2002)
  - Total: 438

Kozjak (pronounced [kɔˈzjaːk] or [ˈkoːzjak]) is a dispersed settlement in the Municipality of Mislinja in northern Slovenia. The area is part of the traditional region of Carinthia and is now included in the Carinthia Statistical Region.

The local parish church is dedicated to Saints Hermagoras and Fortunatus and belongs to the Parish of Saint Florian. It dates to the second half of the 13th century with a new nave added to it in 1870.
