= Rakovec, Vitanje =

Rakovec
- Location in Slovenia
- Coordinates: 46°26′10″N 15°17′55″E
- Country: Slovenia
- Traditional region: Styria
- Statistical region: Savinja
- Municipality: Vitanje
- Elevation: 1,050 m (3,440 ft)

Rakovec (pronounced [ˈɾaːkɔʋəts]; German: Rakowitz) is a former settlement in the Municipality of Vitanje in northeastern Slovenia. It is now part of the village of Hudinja. The area is part of the traditional region of Styria. The municipality is now included in the Savinja Statistical Region.

== Geography ==
Rakovec lies in a cirque in the northern part of Hudinja. Mount Turn (elevation: 1,463 meters or 4,800 feet) rises north of the settlement. The headwaters of the Hudinja River, a tributary of the Voglajna River, gather along the surrounding slopes, and the stream then flows through the hamlet and exits the cirque to the southwest.

== History ==
Rakovec was established as a glass-making settlement by the manor in Vitanje in 1781. The glassworks was then sold to Raimund Nowakh, and inherited in turn by his son Ignaz and his nephew Raimund. The last owner, Josef Wokaun, abandoned the glassworks in 1874, and in 1888 his widow sold the estate to Count Vincenz von Thurn und Valsassina-Como-Vercelli (1866–1928). During the Second World War, the Partisans requisitioned property at the estate and destroyed the telephone connection there, which had been set up in 1921. The estate was nationalized by the new communist government after the war.

Rakovec was deemed annexed by Hudinja in 1952, ending any existence it had as an independent settlement.

== Cultural heritage ==
The entire settlement of Rakovec has been registered as cultural heritage due to its historical role in glassmaking and later in forest management. Individual structures in the settlement that have been given cultural heritage status include the school, the 19th-century Žagar house, the 18th-century forestry building, and the 19th-century water-powered sawmill.
