= Rakovec =

Rakovec may refer to:

- Rakovec, Bogovinje, a village in Bogovinje Municipality, Republic of North Macedonia
- Rakovec, Brežice, a village in the Municipality of Brežice, Slovenia
- Rakovec, Metlika, a village in the Municipality of Metlika, Slovenia
- Rakovec, Šmarje pri Jelšah, a village in the Municipality of Šmarje pri Jelšah, Slovenia
- Rakovec, Čaška, a village in Čaška Municipality, Republic of North Macedonia
- Rakovec nad Ondavou, a village and municipality in the Michalovce District in the Kosice Region of Slovakia
- Rakovec, Varaždin County, a village near Ljubešćica, Croatia
- Rakovec, Vitanje, a former village in the Municipality of Vitanje, Slovenia
- Rakovec, Zagreb County, a village and a municipality in Croatia
- Veľký Rakovec, a village in western Ukraine in the Irshavskiy Raion in the Zakarpattia Oblast

== See also ==
- Rakovica (disambiguation)
