= Grmovšek Lodge Below Big Kopa =

Grmovšek Lodge Below Big Kopa Peak
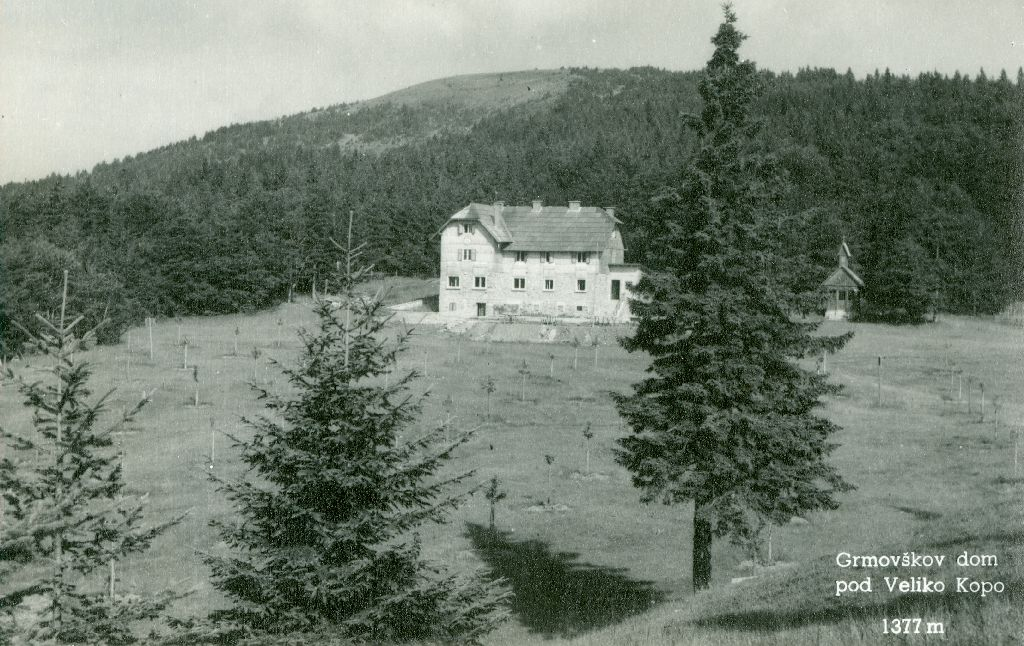
- Postcard of the Grmovšek Lodge; Below Big Kopa Peak (1960)

Highest point
- Elevation: 1,377 m (4,518 ft)
- Coordinates: 46°30′11.160″N 15°12′54.720″E

Naming
- Native name: Grmovškov dom pod Veliko Kopo (Slovene)

Geography
- Location within Slovenia
- Location: Slovenia
- Parent range: Pohorje

The Grmovšek Lodge Below Big Kopa Peak (Slovene: Grmovškov dom pod Veliko Kopo; 1377 m) is mountain hut under Big Kopa on the westernmost and highest part of Pohorje. The hut was built in 1937 and soon became important for hiking and wintersports. In 1942 it was burnt down, the hikers built new one in 1947, but it was also burnt down the same year. The third hut opened in 1954 and was named after Miloš Grmovšek, the then president of the Slovenj Gradec Hiking Club (PD Slovenj Gradec).

== Starting points ==
- 1 1/2h from the Ribnica Lodge (Ribniška koča)
- 2 3/4h from the village of Dovže

== See also ==
- Slovenian Mountain Hiking Trail
