= Paka, Mislinja =

Paka
- Location in Slovenia
- Coordinates: 46°25′40.45″N 15°15′5.47″E
- Country: Slovenia
- Traditional region: Carinthia
- Statistical region: Carinthia
- Municipality: Mislinja

Area
  - Total: 3.47 km^{2} (1.34 sq mi)
- Elevation: 957.5 m (3,141 ft)

Population (2002)
  - Total: 49

Paka (pronounced [ˈpaːka]) is a dispersed settlement in the Municipality of Mislinja in northern Slovenia. It lies in the southern part of the Pohorje Hills with the main part of the settlement extending into the neighbouring Municipality of Vitanje. The area is part of the traditional region of Carinthia. It is now included in the Carinthia Statistical Region.
