= Srednji Dolič =

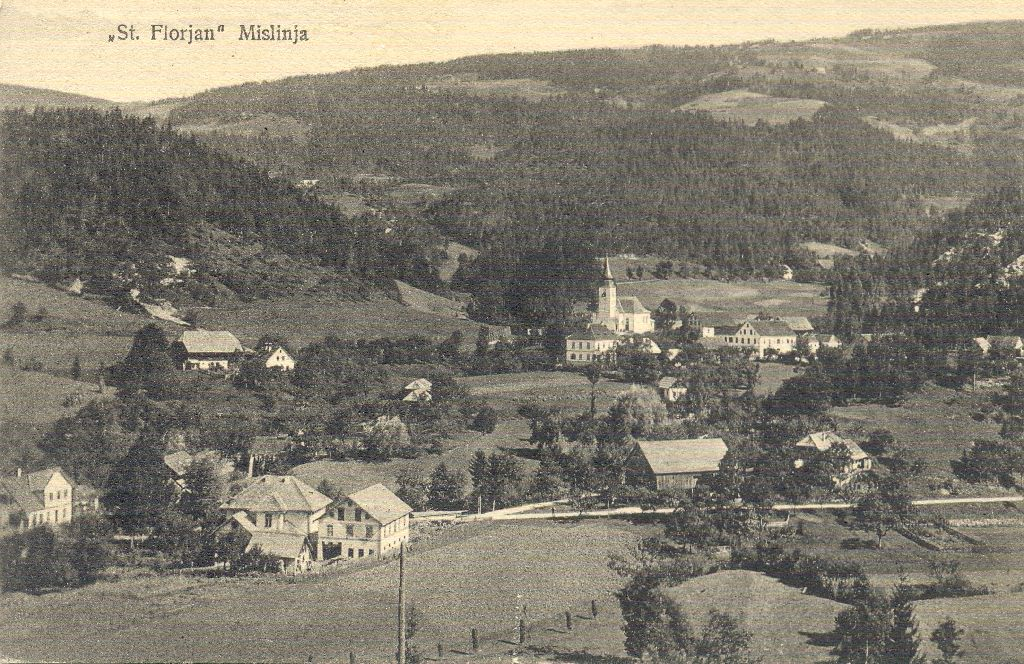
- 1918 postcard of Srednji Dolič

- Location in Slovenia
- Coordinates: 46°25′13.8″N 15°13′11.54″E
- Country: Slovenia
- Traditional region: Carinthia
- Statistical region: Carinthia
- Municipality: Mislinja

Area
  - Total: 5 km^{2} (1.9 sq mi)
- Elevation: 571.1 m (1,874 ft)

Population (2002)
  - Total: 249

Srednji Dolič (pronounced [ˈsɾeːdnji ˈdɔːlitʃ] or [ˈsɾeːdnji ˈdoːlitʃ]) is a settlement in the Municipality of Mislinja in northern Slovenia. It lies at the upper course of the Paka River, in the hills either side of the regional road from Mislinja to Vitanje. The area is part of the traditional region of Carinthia. It is now included in the Carinthia Statistical Region.

== Mass grave ==
Srednji Dolič is the site of a mass grave associated with the Second World War. The Kot Mass Grave (Slovene: Grobišče Kot) is located on the steep edge of a wooded slope 200 meters (660 ft) east of the Jeseničnik farm. It contains the remains of an unknown number of Ustaša soldiers.
