= Alpaca (disambiguation) =

An alpaca is a South American camelid.

Alpaca or ALPACA may also refer to:

- Alpaca fiber, the fleece of the Alpaca
- ALCAPA (tectonic plate), see Carpathian Mountains § Geology
- Anomalous left coronary artery from the pulmonary artery, a rare congenital anomaly
- Dynetics Autonomous Logistics Platform for All-Moon Cargo Access (ALPACA), the Dynetics entry for the NASA Human Landing System lunar lander competition
- The refinement of LLaMA, a large language model from Meta AI, by the Stanford Center for Research on Foundation Models

== See also ==
- Grass Mud Horse, a parody originating from Mainland China of 2009 that features the alpaca
- Alpacca, nickel silver
- Paca (disambiguation)
