= Stenica =

- Location in Slovenia
- Coordinates: 46°22′44.33″N 15°18′53.97″E
- Country: Slovenia
- Traditional region: Styria
- Statistical region: Savinja
- Municipality: Vitanje

Area
  - Total: 6.51 km^{2} (2.51 sq mi)
- Elevation: 629.8 m (2,066 ft)

Population (2002)
  - Total: 160

Stenica (pronounced [stɛˈniːtsa]) is a dispersed settlement in the Municipality of Vitanje in northeastern Slovenia. It lies in the hills south and east of Vitanje. Traditionally it was part of the Styria region and is now included in the Savinja Statistical Region.
