= Rakovica =

Rakovica is a Serbo-Croatian place name, meaning "crab". It may refer to:

- Rakovica, Belgrade, an urban neighborhood and a municipality in Serbia
- Rakovica, Croatia, a municipality near Plitvice Lakes in Croatia
- Rakovica, Čajetina, a village in western Serbia
- Rakovica, Ilidža, a village in Bosnia and Herzegovina
- Rakovica, Kozarska Dubica, a village in Bosnia and Herzegovina
- Rakovica, Kranj in Slovenia
- Rakovica, the Hungarian name for Racovița, Sibiu, a commune in Romania
- Rakovica, the Hungarian name for Racovița, Timiș, a commune in Romania
- Mala Rakovica, a settlement near Samobor, Croatia
- Selo Rakovica, an urban neighborhood of Belgrade, Serbia
- Velika Rakovica, a settlement near Samobor, Croatia

== See also ==
- Rakovitsa (disambiguation)
- Rakovec (disambiguation)
