= Ljubnica =

- Location in Slovenia
- Coordinates: 46°23′27.59″N 15°19′43.37″E
- Country: Slovenia
- Traditional region: Styria
- Statistical region: Savinja
- Municipality: Vitanje

Area
  - Total: 6.03 km^{2} (2.33 sq mi)
- Elevation: 601.4 m (1,973 ft)

Population (2002)
  - Total: 311

Ljubnica (pronounced [ljubˈniːtsa] or [ˈljuːbnitsa]) is a dispersed settlement in the Municipality of Vitanje in northeastern Slovenia. The area is part of the traditional region of Styria and is now included with the rest of the municipality in the Savinja Statistical Region.
