= Razborca =

- Location in Slovenia
- Coordinates: 46°28′18.04″N 15°10′39.93″E
- Country: Slovenia
- Traditional region: Carinthia
- Statistical region: Carinthia
- Municipality: Mislinja

Area
  - Total: 9.16 km^{2} (3.54 sq mi)
- Elevation: 803 m (2,635 ft)

Population (2002)
  - Total: 118

Razborca (pronounced [ˈɾaːzbɔɾtsa]) is a settlement in the Pohorje Hills in the Municipality of Mislinja in northern Slovenia. The area is part of the traditional region of Carinthia. It is now included in the Carinthia Statistical Region.
