= Vitanjsko Skomarje =

Vitanjsko Skomarje Skomarje (until 1994) Skomarje - del (1994–1998)
- Location in Slovenia
- Coordinates: 46°24′2.46″N 15°20′20.1″E
- Country: Slovenia
- Traditional region: Styria
- Statistical region: Savinja
- Municipality: Vitanje

Area
  - Total: 1.81 km^{2} (0.70 sq mi)
- Elevation: 799.9 m (2,624 ft)

Population (2002)
  - Total: 84

Vitanjsko Skomarje (pronounced [ˈʋiːtanskɔ ˈskoːmaɾjɛ]) is a dispersed settlement in the Municipality of Vitanje in northeastern Slovenia. The area is part of the traditional region of Styria. It is now included with the rest of the municipality in the Savinja Statistical Region.

== History ==
Until 1994, what is now Vitanjsko Skomarje was part of a larger settlement called Skomarje. The new municipalities of Zreče and Vitanje were created in 1994, with a border running through Skomarje, and the two parts were both officially designated Skomarje - del (literally, 'part of Skomarje'). The settlement in the Municipality of Vitanje was renamed Vitanjsko Skomarje in 1998, and the one in the Municipality of Zreče was named Skomarje. Further adjustments to the territory of the settlement took place in 1999 and 2004.
