= Dovže =

- Village
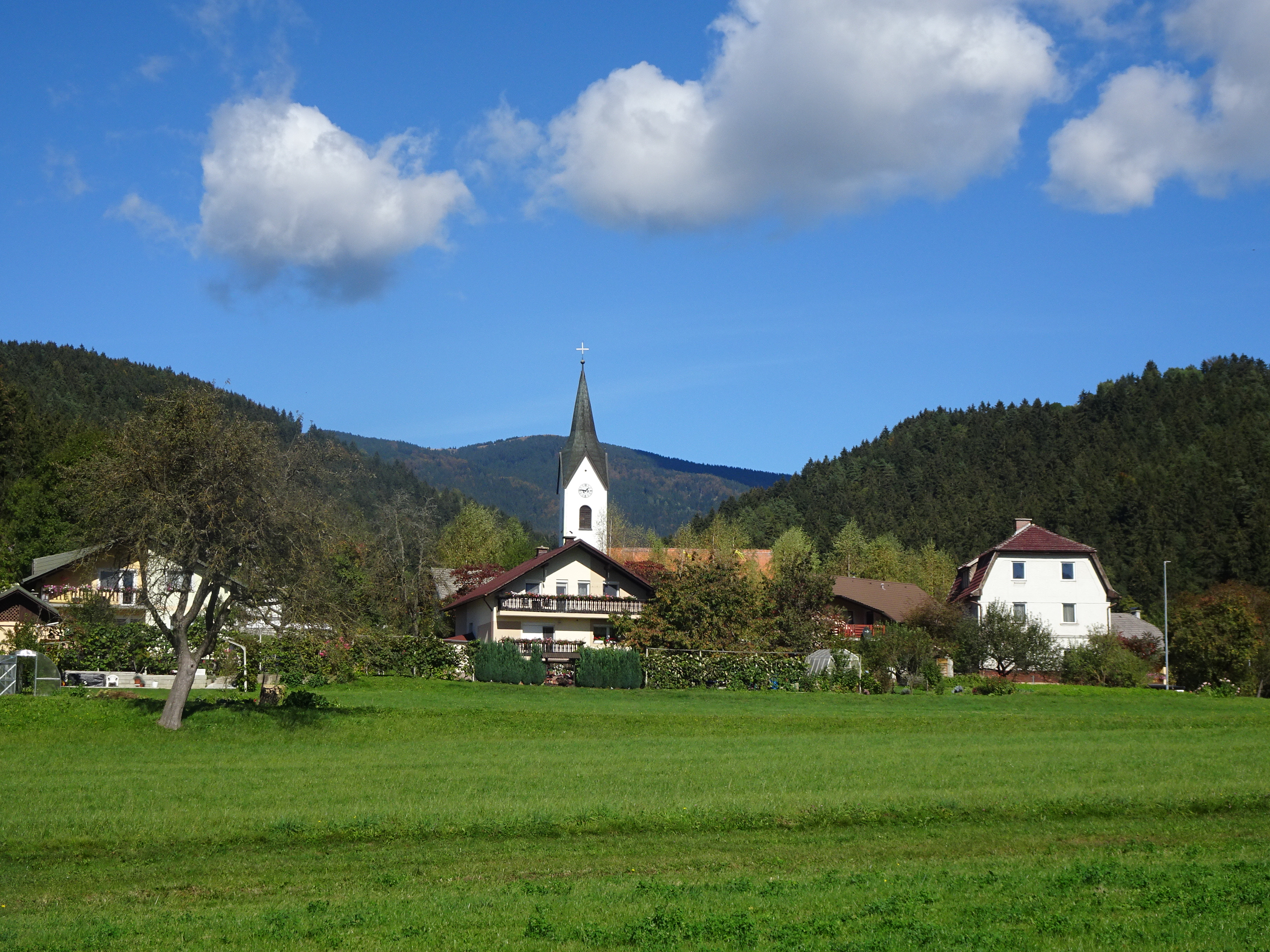

- Location in Slovenia
- Coordinates: 46°27′44.1″N 15°9′56.23″E
- Country: Slovenia
- Traditional region: Carinthia
- Statistical region: Carinthia
- Municipality: Mislinja

Area
  - Total: 2.13 km^{2} (0.82 sq mi)
- Elevation: 577.8 m (1,896 ft)

Population (2002)
  - Total: 349

Dovže (pronounced [ˈdoːu̯ʒɛ]) is a village in the Municipality of Mislinja in northern Slovenia. The area is part of the traditional region of Carinthia. It is now included in the Carinthia Statistical Region.

== Geography ==
Dovže lies between the right bank of the Mislinja River and the foothills of the Pohorje Massif below the Razborca Ridge (965 meters or 3,166 feet) on an alluvial fan mostly consisting of gravel above Tertiary clay and loam. It includes the hamlets of Spodnje Dovže (literally, 'lower Dovže') at the lower edge of the fan and Zgornje Dovže (literally, 'upper Dovže') at the confluence of Dovžanka and Turičnica creeks. The soil is relatively fertile, and has a heavy loam consistency in places. Most of the gravelly terrace is covered by tilled fields. Coniferous woods stand to the northwest towards Brda.

== Name ==
Dovže was first attested in written sources in 1318 as Dolsach (and as Dolzach in 1336 and Dolsach in 1452). The name is derived from the plural demonym *Dolžane, presumably derived from an earlier toponym such as *Dolgo selo or *Dolga vas (both 'long village') or *Dolgo polje 'long field'.

== Church ==
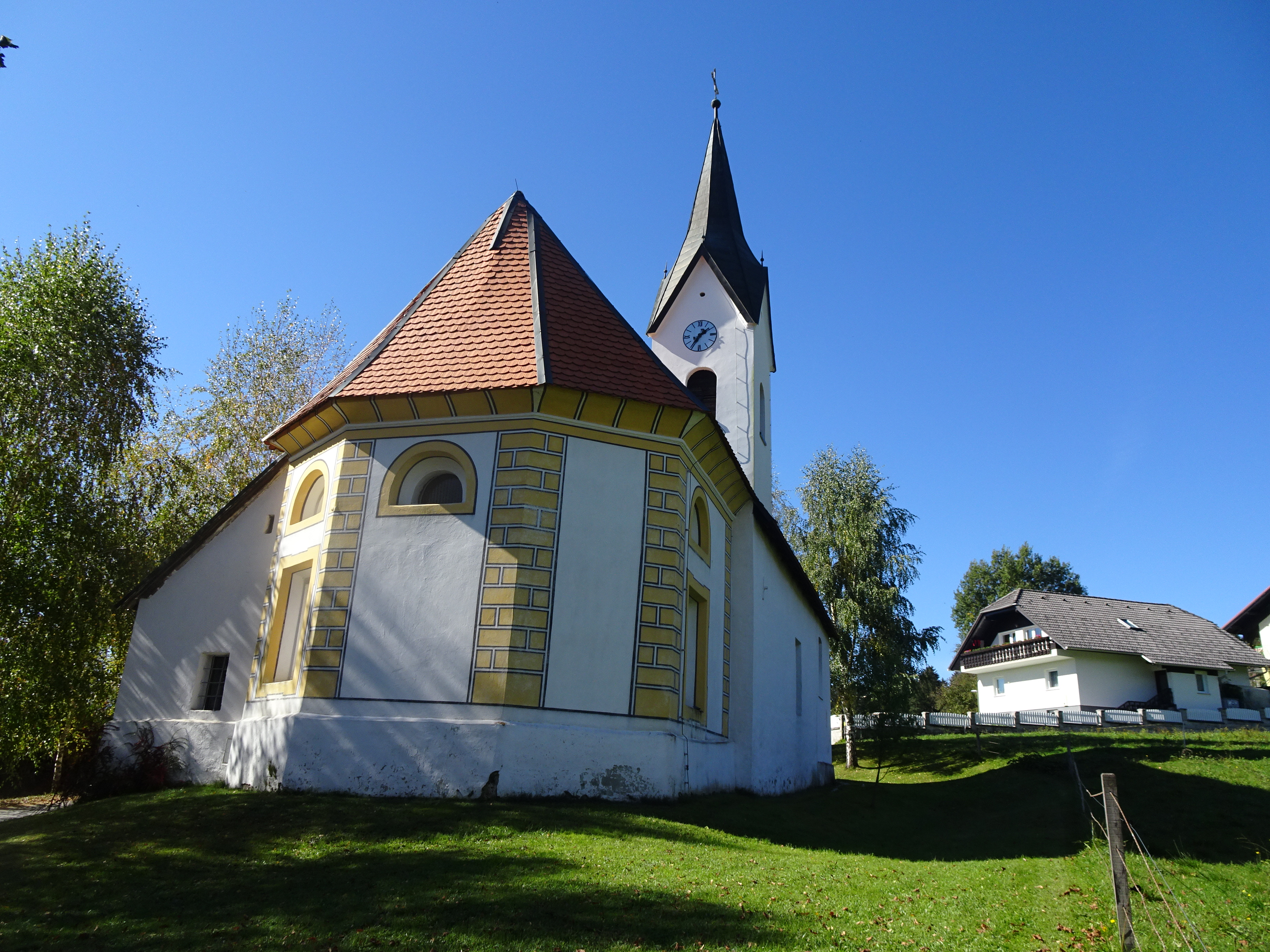
Saint Ulrich's Church in Dovže

The local church is dedicated to Saint Ulrich (Slovene: sveti Urh) and belongs to the Parish of Šentilj pod Turjakom. It was first mentioned in written documents dating to 1336. Some of the original building is preserved in the southern wall of the nave, but most of the rest of the current building dates to the early 18th century.

== Mass grave ==
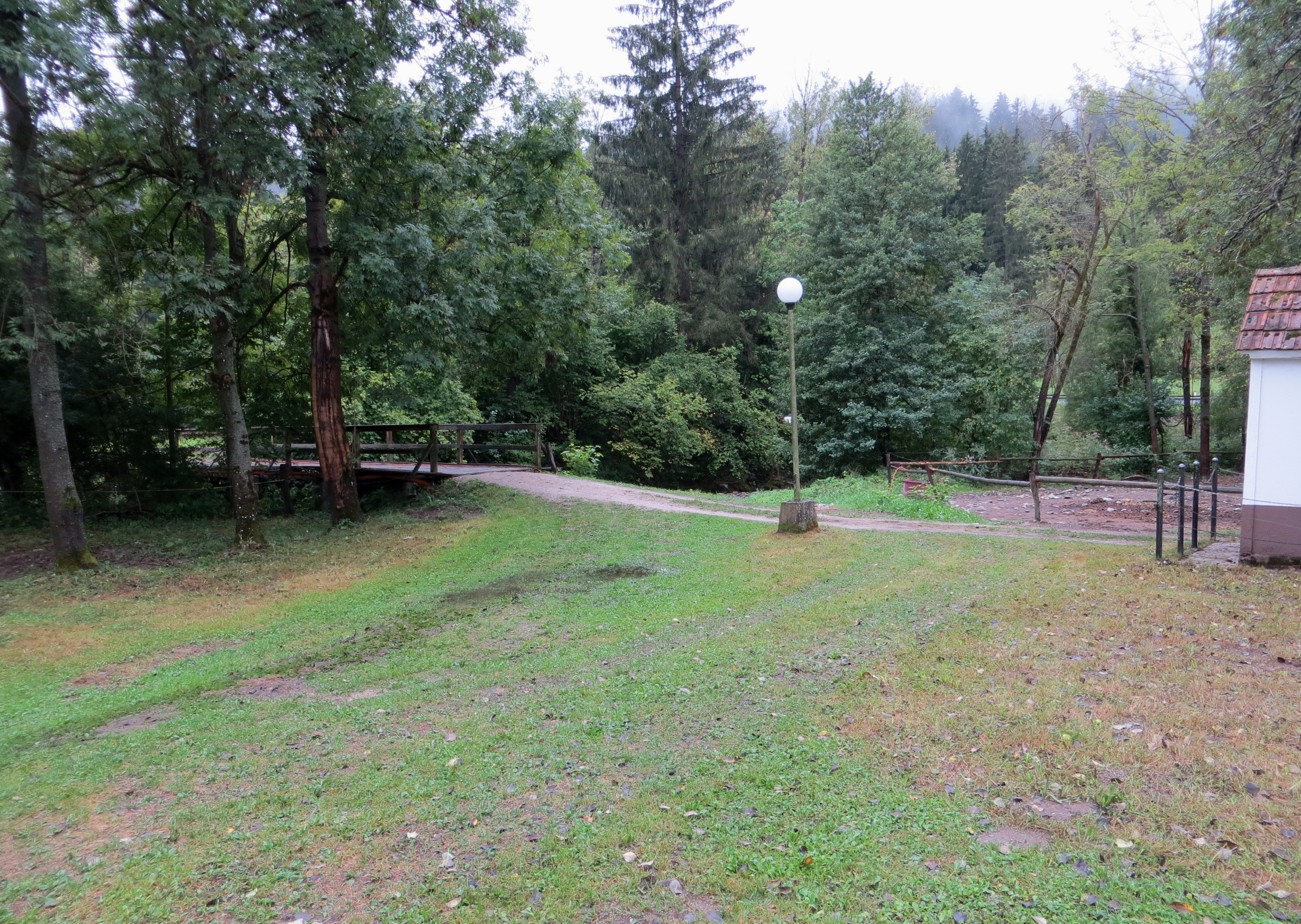
The Jevšnik Farm Shrine Mass Grave

Dovže is the site of a mass grave from the end of the Second World War. The Jevšnik Farm Shrine Mass Grave (Slovene: Grobišče ob kapelici pri domačiji Jevšnik) is located east of a chapel-shrine and west of the nearby Jevšnik farm. It contains the remains of three unknown victims killed between 10 and 15 May 1945.
