= Jože Tisnikar =

Slovene painter (1928–1998)

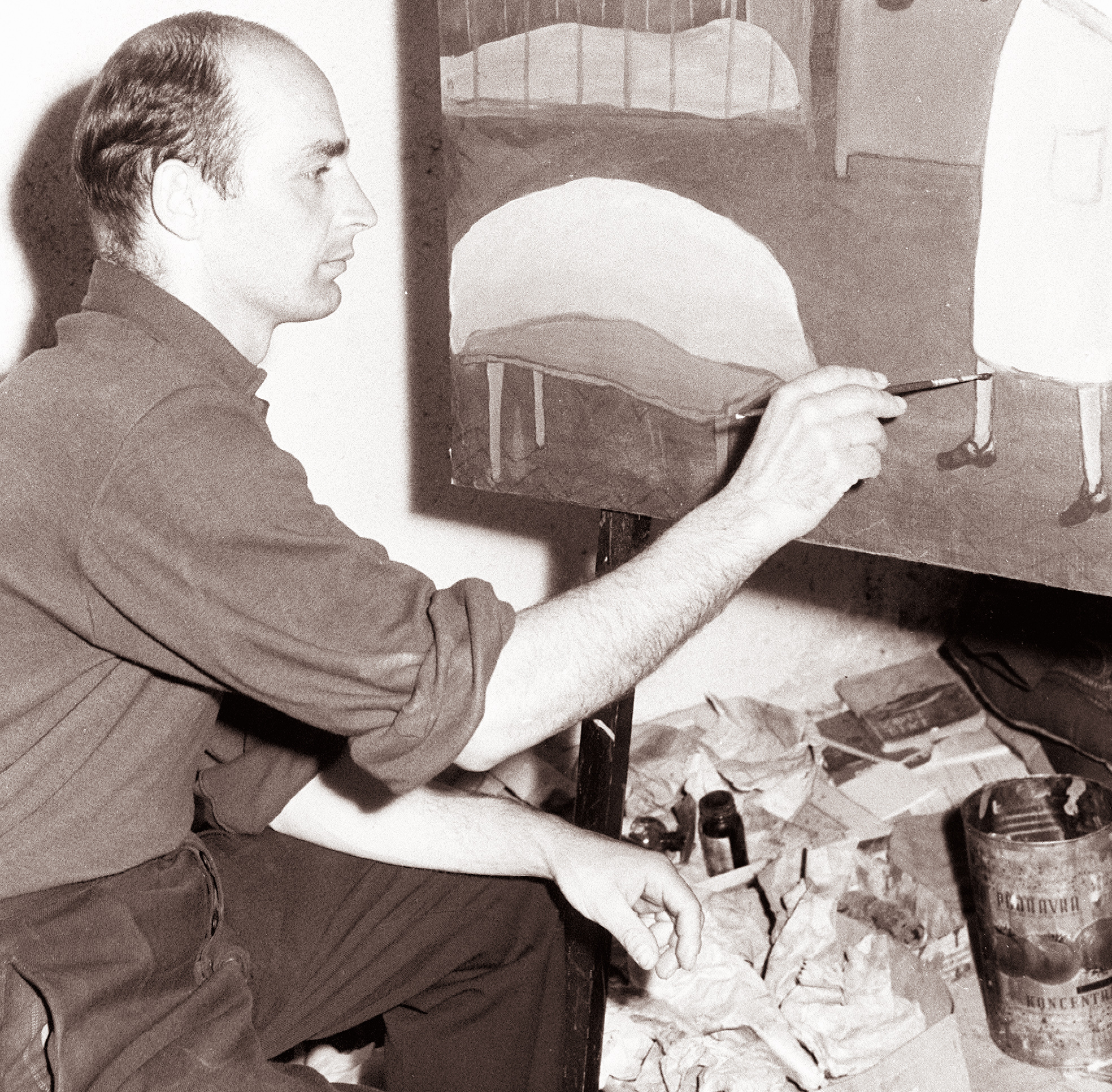
- Jože Tisnikar in 1961
- Born: February 26, 1928; Mislinja, Slovenia
- Died: October 30, 1998 (aged 70); Slovenj Gradec
- Known for: Tempera-style paintings of crows, dead bodies, funerals, landscapes and self-portraits.
- Notable work: Ljubezen
- Style: Egg tempera
- Awards: Prešeren Fund Award; 1970

Jože Tisnikar (26 February 1928 – 30 October 1998) was a Slovenian painter who was known for his egg tempera-style paintings of crows, dead bodies, funerals, landscapes and self-portraits.

== Biography ==
Tisnikar was born in Mislinja, a village at the foot of the Pohorje mountain range. He had a difficult childhood and left elementary school after four years. When his father died, he had to take his place at a cardboard factory, where he worked until he was drafted into the army. He spent two years in the army in Pirot, Serbia, where he worked at a hospital ward and had his first contact with dead bodies. After his military service, he returned to his home village and soon moved to Slovenj Gradec, where he got a job at the local hospital. He performed mostly physical tasks with patients until the hospital opened a morgue, where he was employed as an autopsy assistant. He worked there until his retirement in 1983. He died in 1998 as a pedestrian in a traffic accident, shortly after a retrospective exhibition of his works at the gallery in Slovenj Gradec.

== Artistic career ==
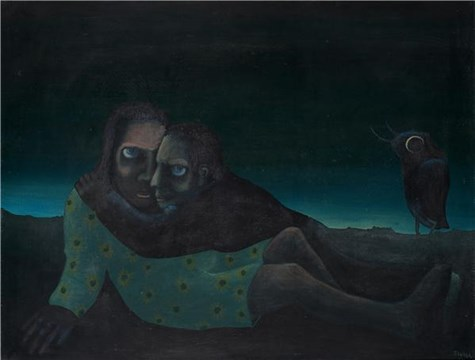
Ljubezen (1977); oil on canvas, tempera, 89,5 cm x 115,5 cm, Museum of Modern and Contemporary Art Koroška, Slovenj Gradec

Tisnikar started to paint in 1955, when he made his first oil painting (Autopsy) with the motif of a morgue atmosphere. He developed his artistic skills under the mentorship of academic painter Karel Pečko in Slovenj Gradec between 1954 and 1964. He received the Prešeren Fund Award in 1970 for his paintings exhibited in 1969.

Tisnikar's paintings were described as "uncomfortable" and depicted the transience of human life. Most of Tisnikar's paintings were done in egg tempera style. He is famous for his representations of crows and dark images of dead people, funerals, landscapes and self-portraits.

== Selected works ==
- Ljubezen (1977)
