= Rakovitsa =

Rakovitsa may refer to:

- Rakovitsa, a village in Makresh Municipality near Vidin, Bulgaria
- Golema Rakovitsa, a village near Sofia, Bulgaria

== See also ==
- Rakovica (disambiguation)
