= Završe =

- Location in Slovenia
- Coordinates: 46°25′15.12″N 15°9′42.19″E
- Country: Slovenia
- Traditional region: Carinthia
- Statistical region: Carinthia
- Municipality: Mislinja

Area
  - Total: 14.84 km^{2} (5.73 sq mi)
- Elevation: 807.6 m (2,650 ft)

Population (2002)
  - Total: 416

Završe (pronounced [ˈzaːʋəɾʃɛ]) is a dispersed settlement in the Municipality of Mislinja in northern Slovenia. The area is part of the traditional region of Carinthia. It is now included in the Carinthia Statistical Region.

== Church ==
The local parish church is dedicated to Saint Vitus (Slovene: sveti Vid) and belongs to the Roman Catholic Archdiocese of Maribor. It was first mentioned in written documents dating to 1320. A second church in the settlement is dedicated to Saint Rupert. It was built around 1860.

== Mass grave ==
Završe is the site of a mass grave from the period immediately after the Second World War. The Herlah Farm Mass Grave (Slovene: Grobišče pri domačiji Herlah) is located in a meadow on the west side of the road from Velenje to Slovenj Gradec, near the house at Završe no. 86. It contains the remains of 10 to 20 unknown victims that were killed while fleeing toward the Austrian border and were buried in one to three pits between May 10 and 15, 1945.
