= Skomarje =

- Village
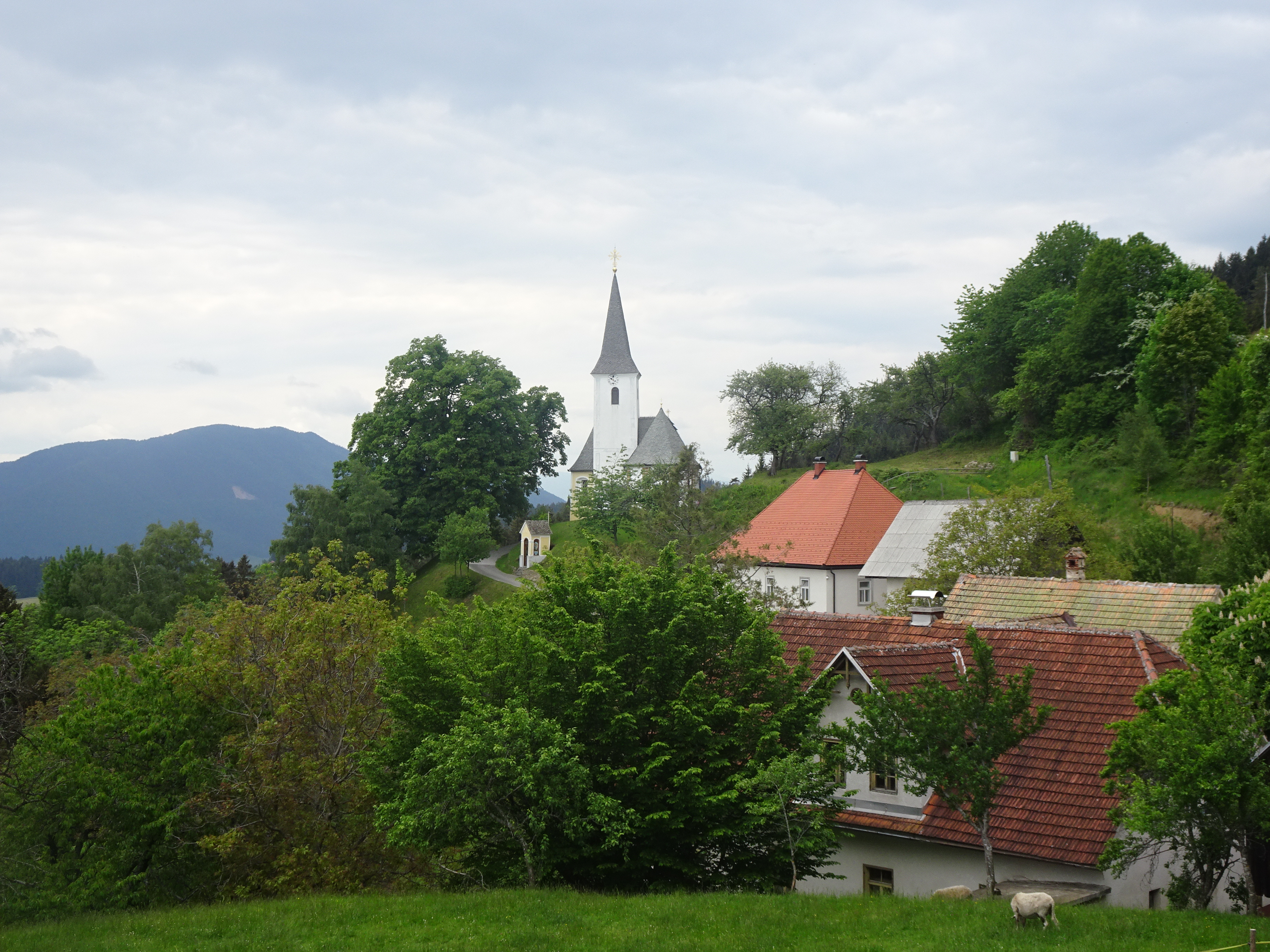
- Skomarje with St. Lambert's Church

- Location in Slovenia
- Coordinates: 46°23′40.21″N 15°21′44.27″E
- Country: Slovenia
- Traditional region: Styria
- Statistical region: Savinja
- Municipality: Zreče

Area
  - Total: 7.79 km^{2} (3.01 sq mi)
- Elevation: 714 m (2,343 ft)

Population (2002)
  - Total: 161
- Climate: Dfb

Skomarje (pronounced [ˈskoːmaɾjɛ]) is a settlement in the Pohorje Hills northwest of Zreče in northeastern Slovenia. The area is part of the traditional region of Styria. It is now included with the rest of the Municipality of Zreče in the Savinja Statistical Region.

== History ==
Until 1994, Skomarje was part of a larger settlement together with what is now Vitanjsko Skomarje. The new municipalities of Zreče and Vitanje were created in 1994, with a border running through Skomarje, and the two parts were both officially named Skomarje - del (literally, 'part of Skomarje'). The settlement in the Municipality of Vitanje was renamed Vitanjsko Skomarje in 1998, and the one in the Municipality of Zreče was named Skomarje. Further adjustments to the territory of the settlement took place 2004.

== Church ==
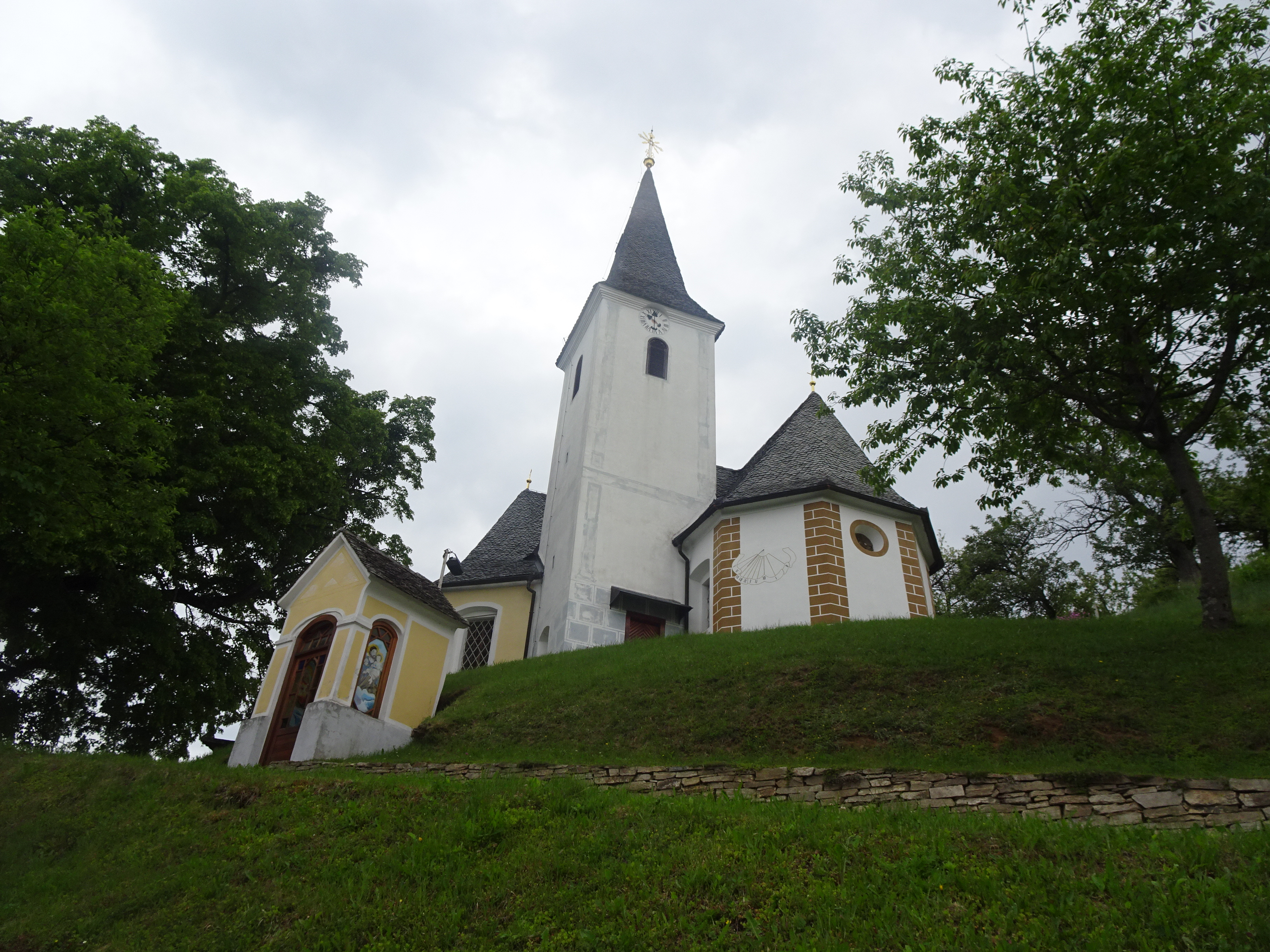
St. Lambert's Parish Church

The local parish church in the village is dedicated to Saint Lambert and belongs to the Roman Catholic Archdiocese of Maribor. It is a medieval church that was expanded in the 18th century.

== Gallery ==
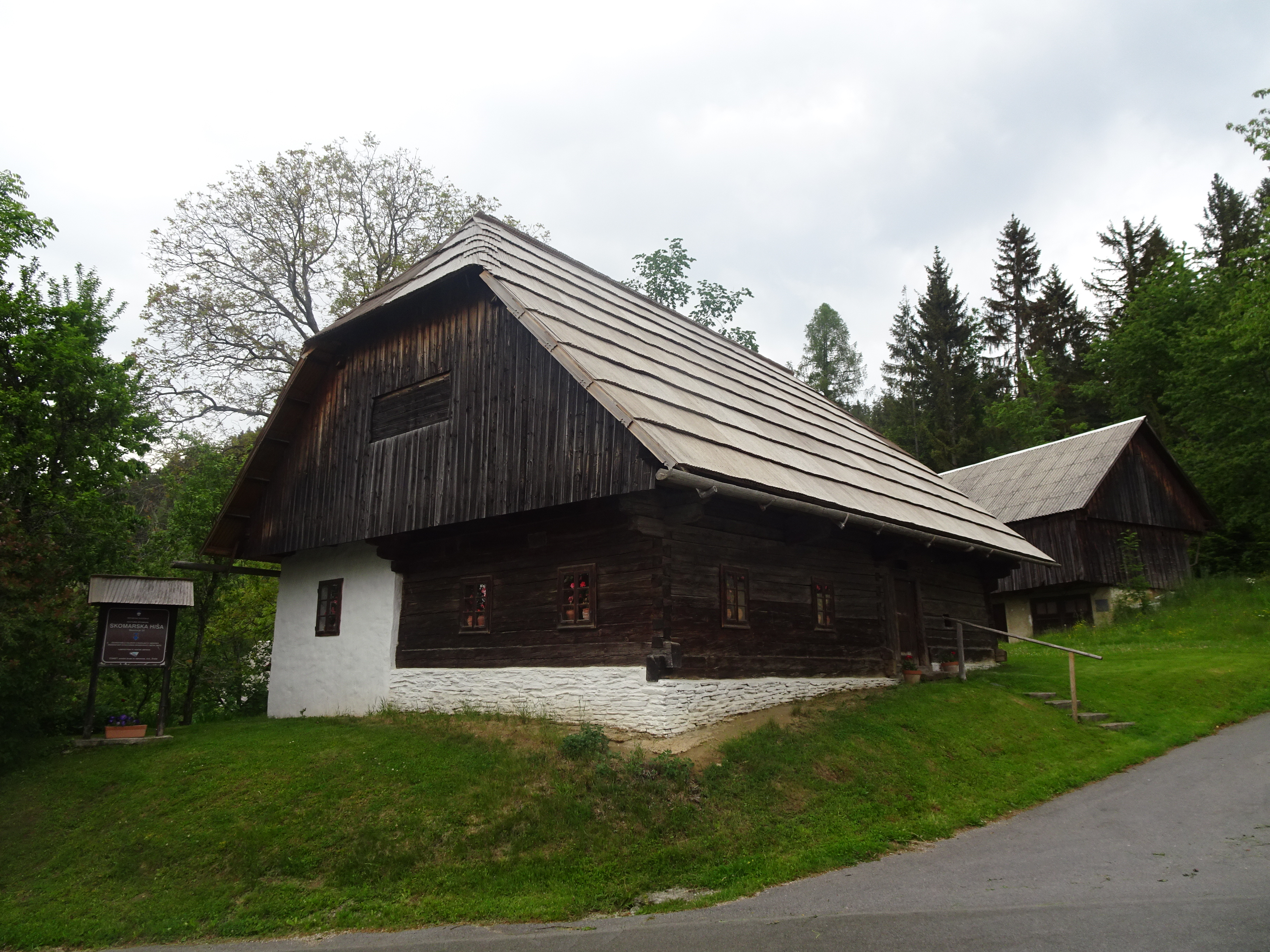
Traditional Pohorje wooden house in Skomarje
