= Tolsti Vrh pri Mislinji =

- Location in Slovenia
- Coordinates: 46°26′17.83″N 15°12′59.1″E
- Country: Slovenia
- Traditional region: Carinthia
- Statistical region: Carinthia
- Municipality: Mislinja

Area
  - Total: 7.22 km^{2} (2.79 sq mi)
- Elevation: 841.1 m (2,760 ft)

Population (2002)
  - Total: 168

Tolsti Vrh pri Mislinji (pronounced [ˈtoːu̯sti ˈʋəɾx pɾi miˈsliːnji]) is a dispersed settlement in the Municipality of Mislinja in northern Slovenia. It lies in the hills east of Mislinja. The area is part of the traditional region of Carinthia. It is now included in the Carinthia Statistical Region.

== Name ==
The name of the settlement was changed from Tolsti Vrh to Tolsti Vrh pri Mislinji in 1952.

== Cultural heritage ==
A small chapel-shrine in the settlement dates to the late 19th century.
