= Brezen, Vitanje =

Brezen
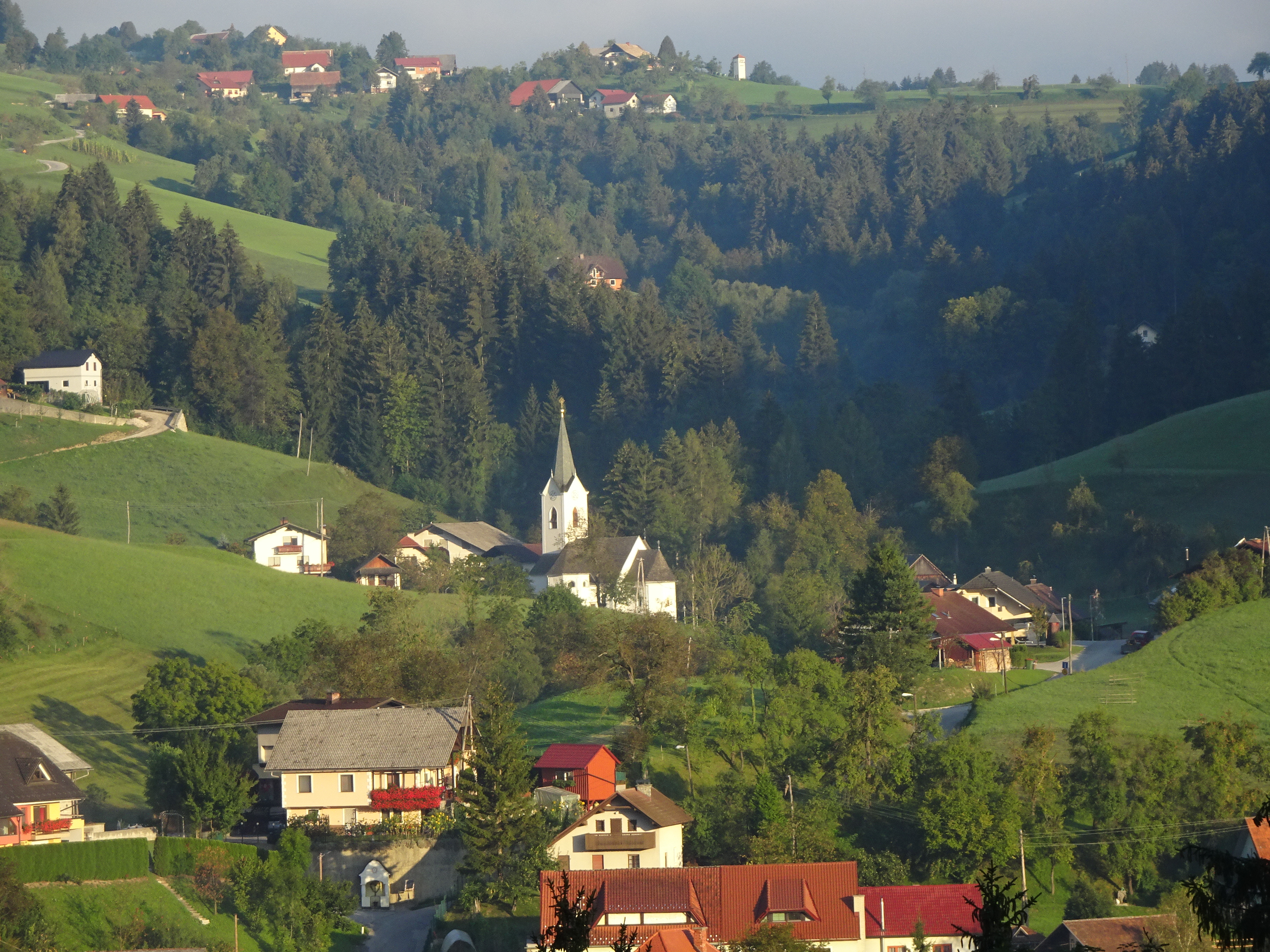

- Location in Slovenia
- Coordinates: 46°22′41.9″N 15°15′42.08″E
- Country: Slovenia
- Traditional region: Styria
- Statistical region: Savinja
- Municipality: Vitanje

Area
  - Total: 10.99 km^{2} (4.24 sq mi)
- Elevation: 779.9 m (2,559 ft)

Population (2002)
  - Total: 218

Brezen (pronounced [ˈbɾeːzən]) is a dispersed settlement in the Municipality of Vitanje in northeastern Slovenia. The area is part of the traditional region of Styria. It is now included with the rest of the municipality in the Savinja Statistical Region.

The local church is dedicated to Saint Anthony and belongs to the Parish of Vitanje. It has a 15th-century Late Gothic nave and sanctuary with 18th- and 19th-century additions.
