= Mislinja (settlement) =

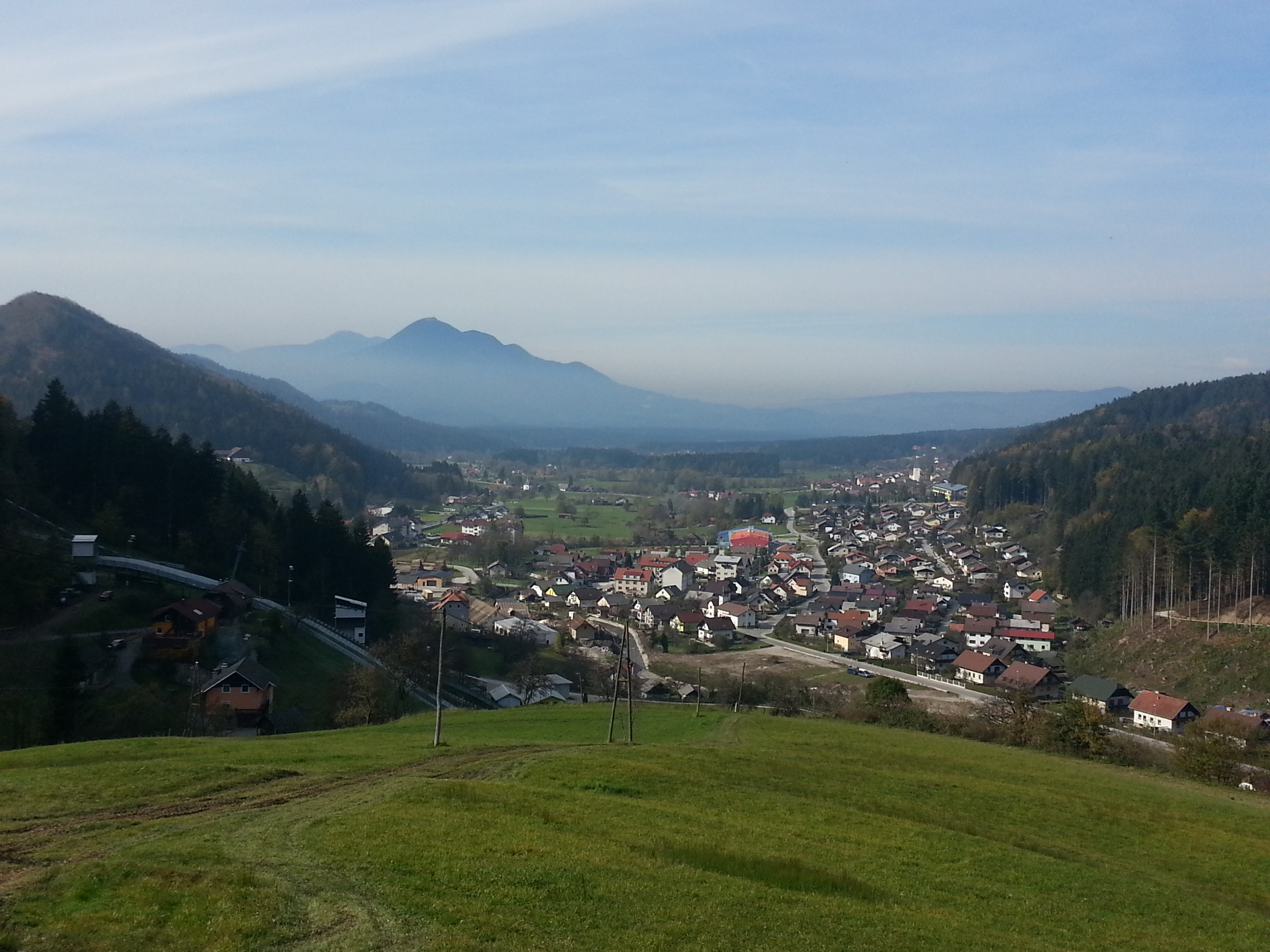

- Location in Slovenia
- Coordinates: 46°26′35″N 15°11′35″E
- Country: Slovenia
- Traditional region: Carinthia
- Statistical region: Carinthia
- Municipality: Mislinja

Area
  - Total: 43.03 km^{2} (16.61 sq mi)
- Elevation: 598.0 m (1,961.9 ft)

Population (2019)
  - Total: 1,862

Mislinja (pronounced [miˈsliːnja]; German: Missling) is a settlement in northern Slovenia. It is the seat of the Municipality of Mislinja. It lies in the valley of the Mislinja River. The area traditionally belonged to Styria. In 1995 it became part of the newly formed Carinthia Statistical Region.

== Geography ==
Mislinja is a sprawling settlement along the upper watershed of the Mislinja River. It includes the core hamlet of Šentlenart as well as Movže to the south, Plavž, Glažuta, Stara Glažuta, Spodnja Komisija, and Zgornja Komisija to the northeast, and Straže and Vovkarje to the west. To the southwest, Mislinja lies along the main road from Velenje to Slovenj Gradec, and to the northeast along a road into the Mislinja Gorge (Slovene: Mislinjski graben or Mislinjski jarek). Surrounding elevations include Mount Volovica (1,455 meters or 4,774 feet) to the east, Turjak Hill (800 meters or 2,600 feet) to the south, and Cestnik Peak (Slovene: Cestnikov vrh; 686 meters or 2,251 feet), Lučevec Hill (780 meters or 2,560 feet), Črepič Hill (798 meters or 2,618 feet), and Fric Peak (Slovene: Fričev vrh; 881 meters or 2,890 feet) to the west. The Mislinja Gorge is petrographically diverse, consisting of schist, diaphorite, quartzite, gneiss, amphibolite, tonalite, and other minerals.

== Name ==
Mislinja was first attested in written sources in 1335 and 1404 as Misling (and as Missling in 1460). The name is derived from an earlier hydronym, *Myslin'a (voda) (literally, 'Myslinъ's creek'), thus referring to people living along the creek. The hypocorism *Myslinъ is derived from the personal name *Myslь. In the local dialect, the settlement is also known as Mislinje. The settlement was known as Missling in German in the past.

== History ==
During the Middle Ages, guards responsible for the provincial border between Carinthia and Styria were stationed in villages in the area; the hamlet of Straže (literally, 'guards') to the northwest reflects this history. A blast furnace operated near Mislinja from 1724 to 1899, reflected in the hamlet name Plavž (literally, 'blast furnace'). The iron ore for the furnace was transported from Vitanje and Šoštanj. There were extensive teamster operations based in Mislinja in the 18th and 19th centuries, and a glass-making facility operated in the hamlet of Glažuta (literally, 'glassworks') from 1796 to 1860. In the past, wood was transported from Mislinja to Dravograd, from which it was then driven along the Drava River. The landowner Arthur Perger (1852–1930) built a 9 km electric railroad through the Mislinja Gorge northeast of the settlement in 1902.

During the Second World War, the Mislinja area was annexed by Germany. Large-scale arrests took place in January 1942, and some of Mislinja's residents fled to Lower Carniola. There was extensive Partisan activity in the area. A bunker that provided care for wounded Partisans and storage was established in the Križnik Woods in May 1944. The Partisans' Pomlad field hospital was established in December 1944 after the Zaklon field hospital was destroyed.

=== Mass graves ===
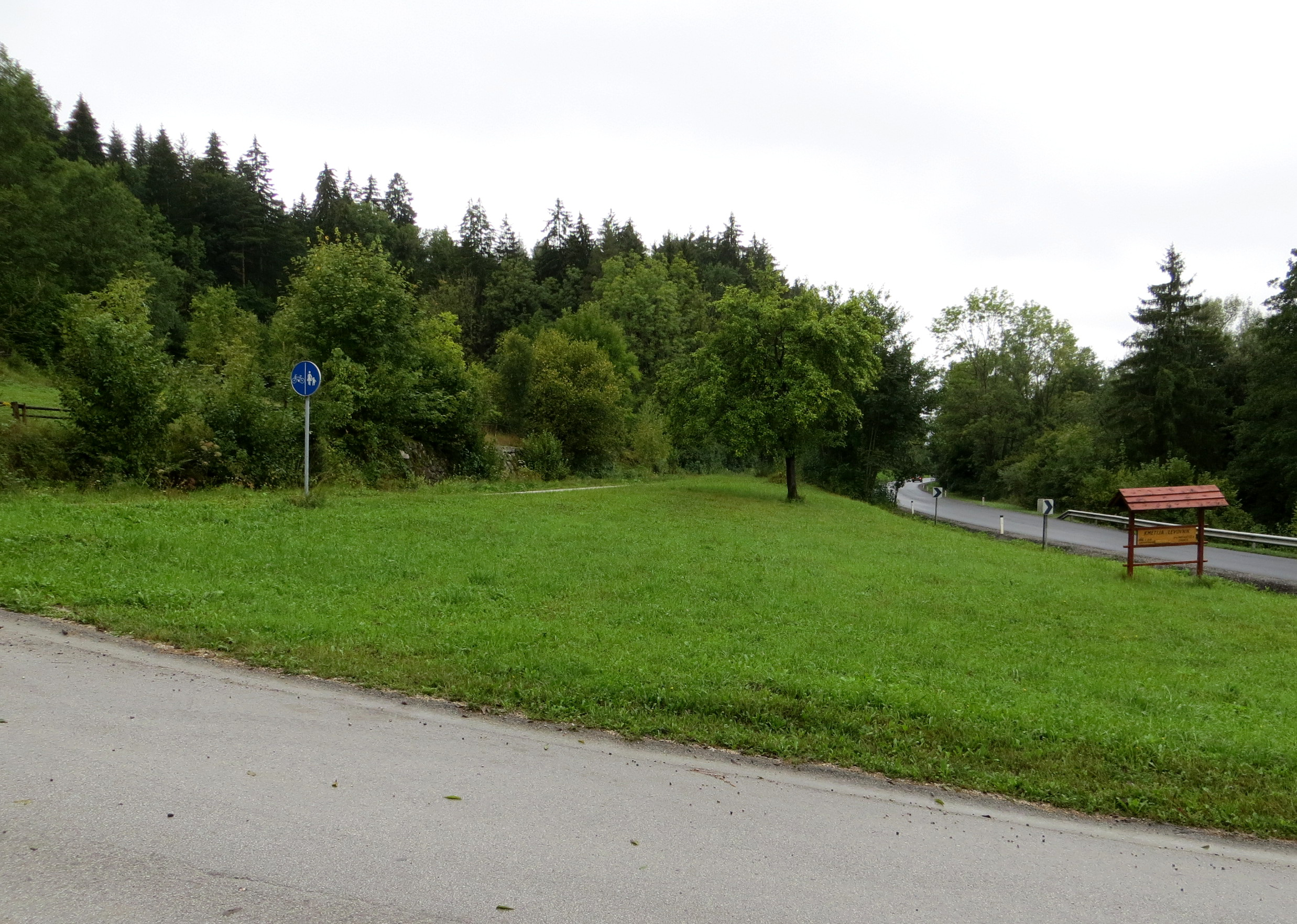
Railroad 4 Mass Grave

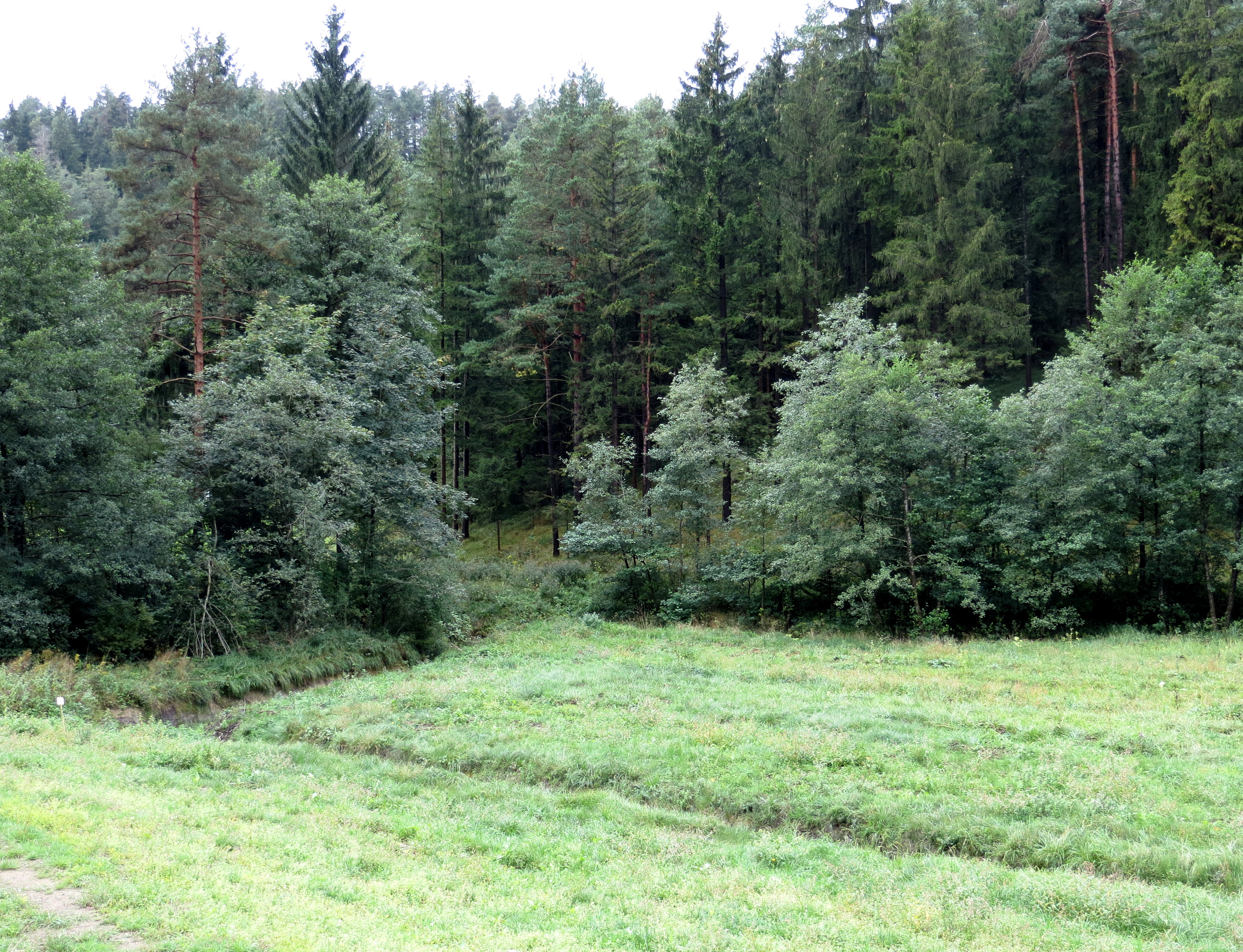
Movže 1 Mass Grave

Mass graves in Mislinja

Mislinja is the site of six known mass graves from the period immediately after the Second World War. All of them contain the remains of victims murdered between 10 and 15 May 1945. The Railroad 1, 2, and 3 mass graves (Slovene: Grobišče ob železniški progi 1, 2, 3) are located west of the settlement, south of the former railroad from Mislinja to Slovenj Gradec. They contain an unknown number of victims. The Railroad 4 Mass Grave (Grobišče ob železniški progi 4) is located west of the settlement in a meadow north of the former railroad. It contains an unknown number of victims. The Movže 1 and 2 mass graves (Grobišče Movže 1, 2) are located south of the settlement. Both are former anti-tank trenches and contain the remains of a large number of Ustaša soldiers and Croatian civilians. The Movže 1 Mass Grave is south of the Abršek farm at Movže no. 24. The Movže 2 Mass Grave is located between the road and the railroad.

== Churches ==
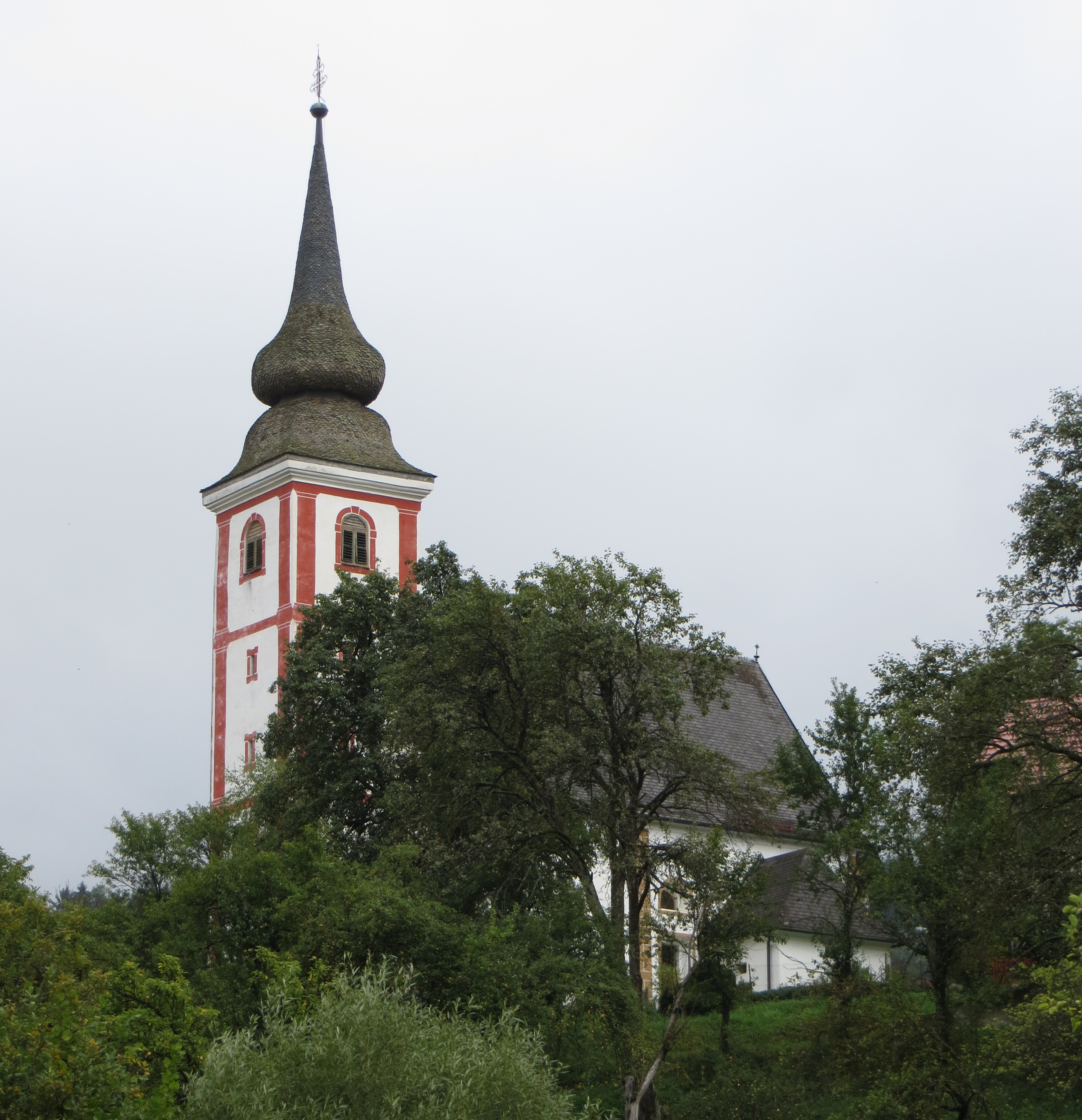
Saint Leonard's Church

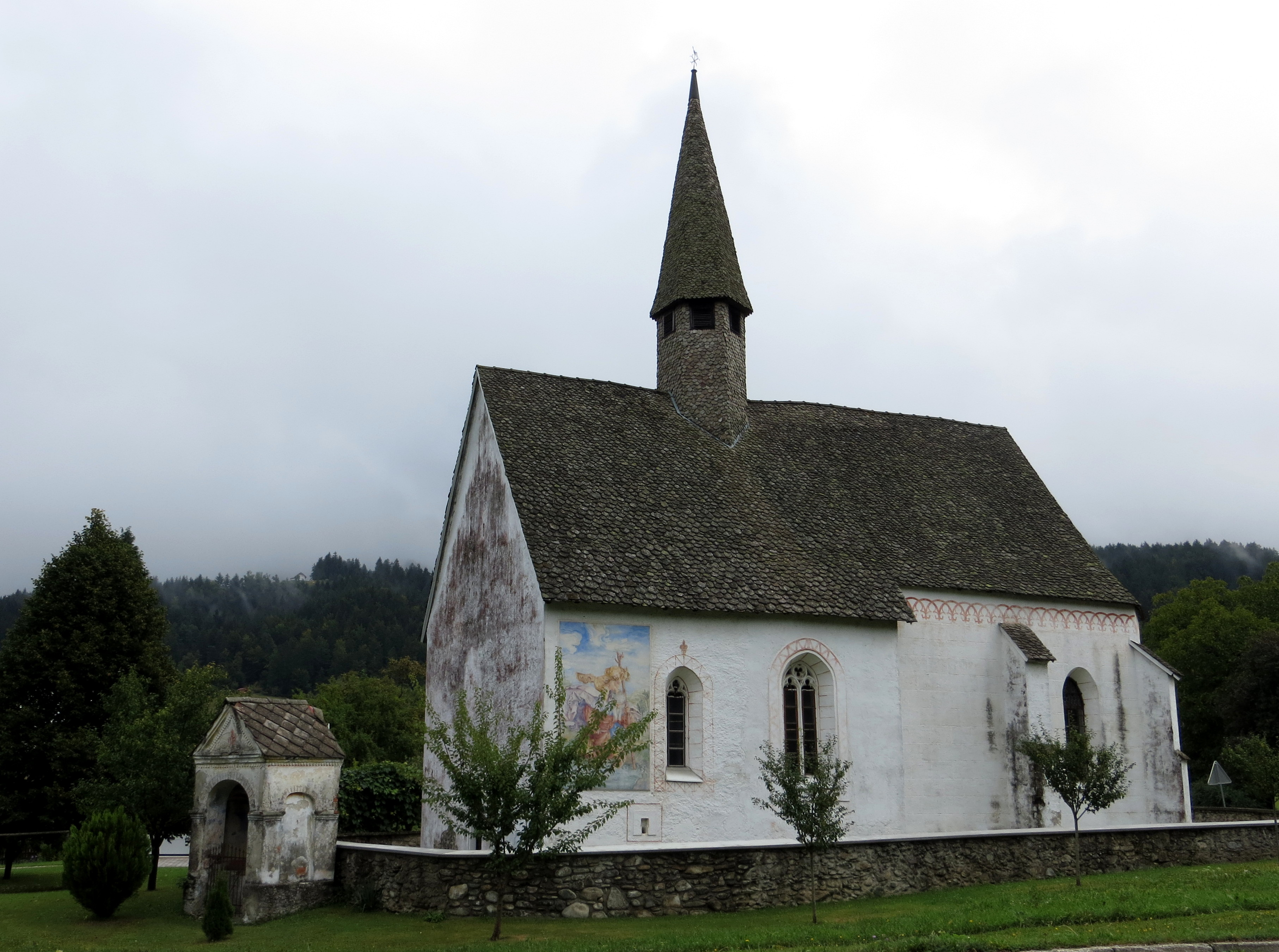
Saint Agathius's Church

Churches in Mislinja

There are two churches in the settlement, both belonging to the Parish of Šentilj pod Turjakom. One is dedicated to Saint Leonard and was built in the mid-17th century on the site of an earlier church first mentioned in written documents dating to 1476. The second is dedicated to Saint Agathius. It was built in the Gothic style in the 14th century and is preserved more or less in its original from.

== Notable people ==
Notable people that were born or lived in Mislinja include:

- Rado Iršič (1910–1941), People's Hero of Yugoslavia
- Matej Stergar (1844–1926), poet and journalist
- Jože Tisnikar (1928–1998), painter
