= Spodnji Dolič =

- Location in Slovenia
- Coordinates: 46°24′23.93″N 15°15′40.7″E
- Country: Slovenia
- Traditional region: Styria
- Statistical region: Savinja
- Municipality: Vitanje

Area
  - Total: 6.81 km^{2} (2.63 sq mi)
- Elevation: 575.8 m (1,889 ft)

Population (2002)
  - Total: 193

Spodnji Dolič (pronounced [ˈspoːdnji ˈdɔːlitʃ] or [ˈspoːdnji ˈdoːlitʃ]; German: Unterdollitsch) is a dispersed settlement in the hills northwest of Vitanje in northeastern Slovenia. The area is part of the traditional region of Styria. It is now included with the rest of the Municipality of Vitanje in the Savinja Statistical Region.

The local church is dedicated to Saint Margaret and belongs to the Parish of Vitanje. It dates to the second half of the 16th century.
