= Municipality of Mislinja =

Municipality of Slovenia

Municipality of Mislinja Občina Mislinja
- Municipality
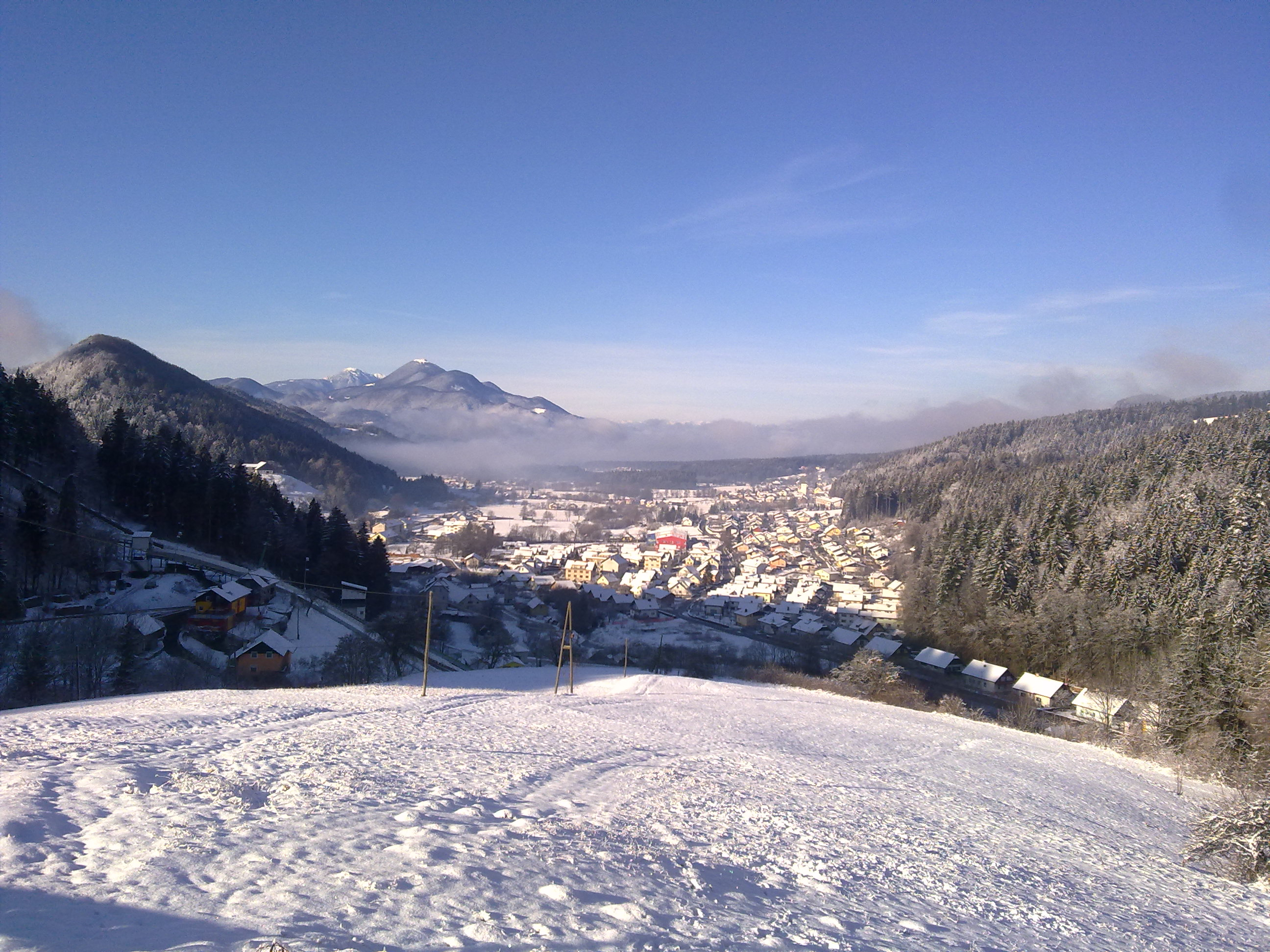

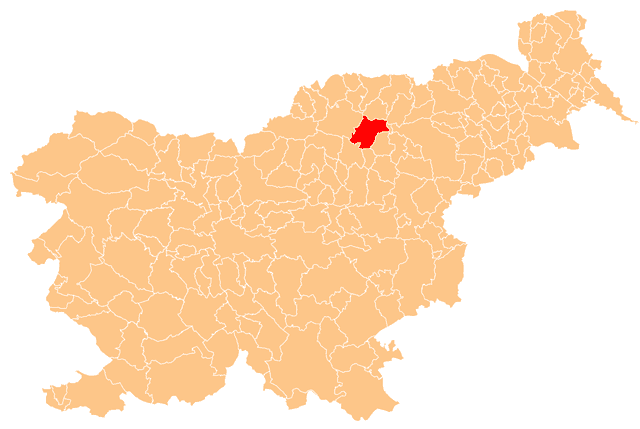
- Location of the Municipality of Mislinja in Slovenia
- Coordinates: 46°27′N 15°12′E
- Country: Slovenia

Government
  - Mayor: Bojan Borovnik (Independent)

Area
  - Total: 112.2 km^{2} (43.3 sq mi)

Population (2016)
  - Total: 4,590
  - Density: 40.9/km^{2} (106/sq mi)
- Time zone: UTC+01 (CET)
  - Summer (DST): UTC+02 (CEST)
- Website: www.mislinja.si

The Municipality of Mislinja (pronounced [miˈsliːnja]; Slovene: Občina Mislinja) is a municipality in the traditional region of Styria in northeastern Slovenia. The seat of the municipality is the town of Mislinja. Mislinja became a municipality in 1994.

== Settlements ==
In addition to the municipal seat of Mislinja, the municipality also includes the following settlements:

- Dovže
- Gornji Dolič
- Kozjak
- Mala Mislinja
- Paka
- Razborca
- Šentilj pod Turjakom
- Srednji Dolič
- Tolsti Vrh pri Mislinji
- Završe
