= Hudinja, Vitanje =

Hudinja
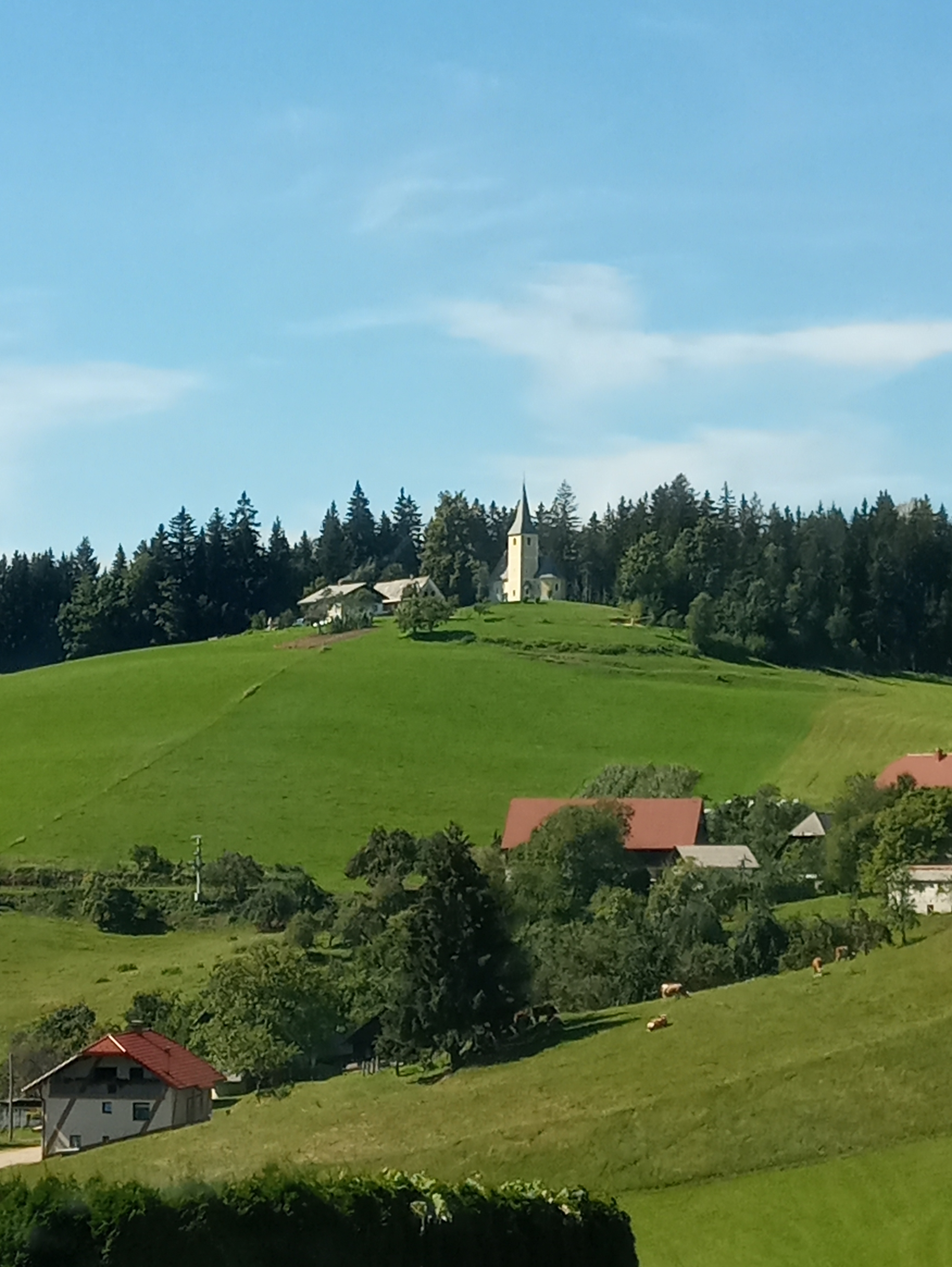

- Location in Slovenia
- Coordinates: 46°26′9.51″N 15°17′55.2″E
- Country: Slovenia
- Traditional region: Styria
- Statistical region: Savinja
- Municipality: Vitanje

Area
  - Total: 16.8 km^{2} (6.5 sq mi)
- Elevation: 1,074.6 m (3,526 ft)

Population (2002)
  - Total: 236

Hudinja (pronounced [xuˈdiːnja]) is a dispersed settlement in the Municipality of Vitanje in northeastern Slovenia. It lies in the hills north of Vitanje at the source of the Hudinja River. The area is part of the traditional region of Styria. It is now included with the rest of the municipality in the Savinja Statistical Region.

The local church is dedicated to Saint Vitus and belongs to the Parish of Vitanje. It is a Late Gothic building with extensive 19th-century rebuilding.
