= Paca (mountain) =

Mountain in Peru

Paka
- Location within Peru

Highest point
- Elevation: 5,510 m (18,080 ft)
- Coordinates: 11°53′45″S 76°03′58″W

Geography
- Location: Peru, Lima Region
- Parent range: Andes, Paryaqaqa

Nevado Paka (Quechua for 'eagle', Hispanicized spelling Paca) is a mountain in the Paryaqaqa mountain range in the Andes of Peru, about 5,510 m (18,080 ft) high. It is situated in the Lima Region, Huarochiri Province, San Mateo District. Paka lies southwest of Wayllakancha, northwest of Pachanqutu and northeast of Tata Qayqu.
