= Šentilj pod Turjakom =

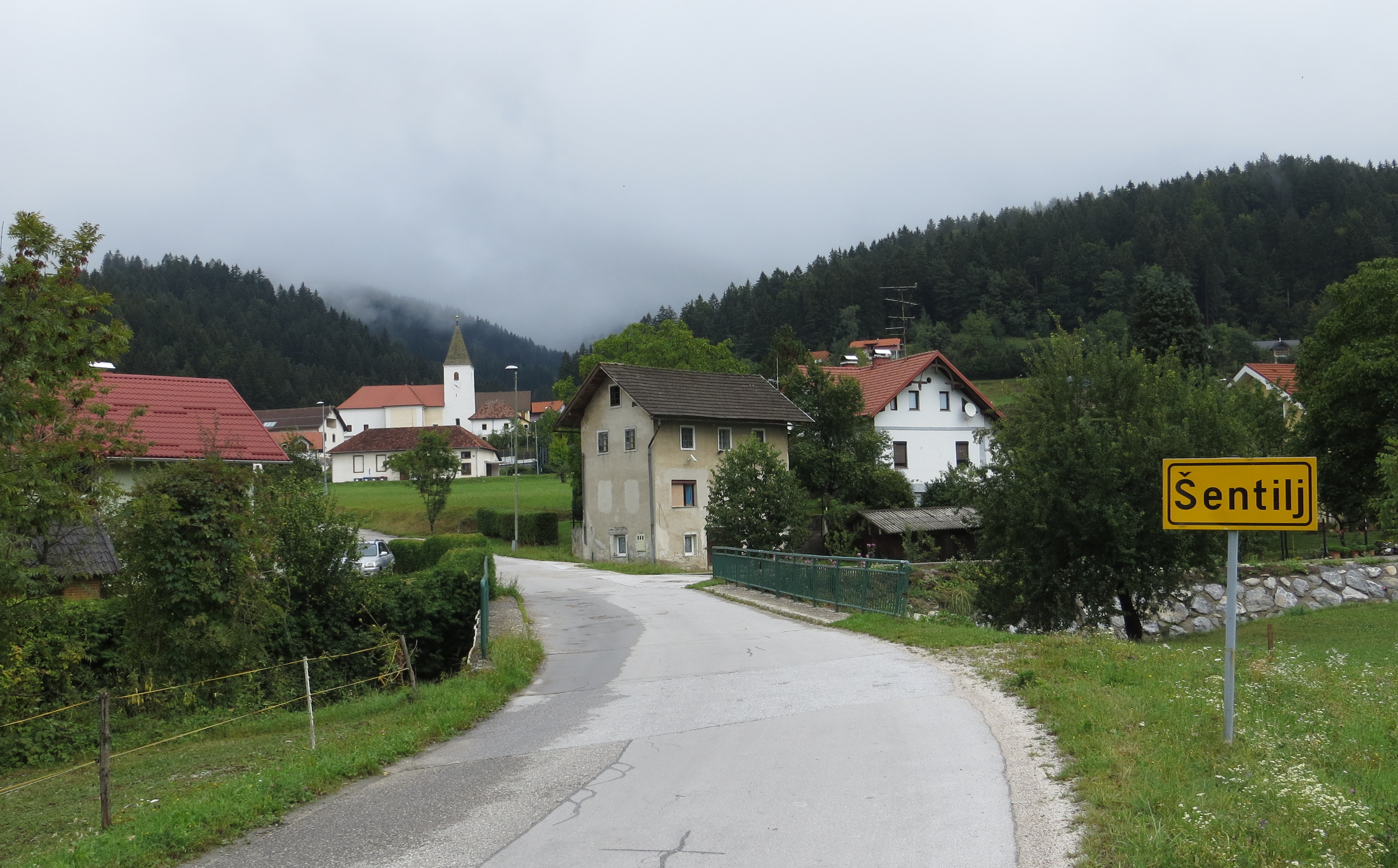

- Location in Slovenia
- Coordinates: 46°26′56.07″N 15°11′12.04″E
- Country: Slovenia
- Traditional region: Carinthia
- Statistical region: Carinthia
- Municipality: Mislinja

Area
  - Total: 1.73 km^{2} (0.67 sq mi)
- Elevation: 583 m (1,913 ft)

Population (2002)
  - Total: 286

Šentilj pod Turjakom (pronounced [ʃɛnˈtiːl pɔt tuˈɾjaːkɔm] or [ʃənˈtiːl pɔt tuˈɾjaːkɔm]) is a village in the Municipality of Mislinja in northern Slovenia. The area is part of the traditional region of Carinthia. It is now included in the Carinthia Statistical Region.

== Church ==
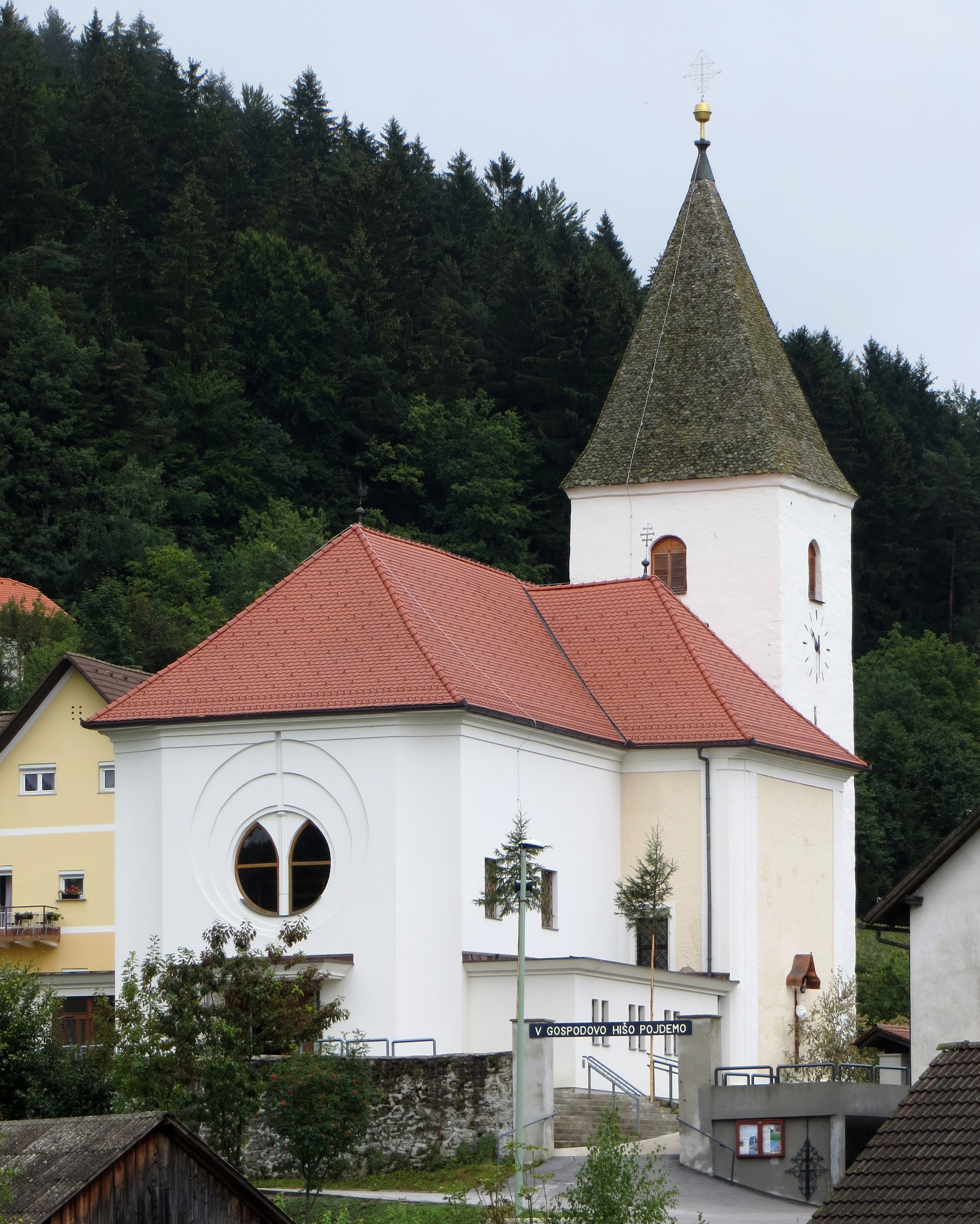
Saint Giles's Church

The parish church from which the settlement gets its name is dedicated to Saint Giles (Slovene: sveti Ilj or Šentilj) and belongs to the Roman Catholic Archdiocese of Maribor. It was first mentioned in written documents dating to 1292. The original Romanesque belfry is preserved in the current church, most of the rest of which dates to the mid-18th century.
