= Municipality of Vitanje =

Municipality of Slovenia

Municipality of Vitanje Občina Vitanje
- Municipality
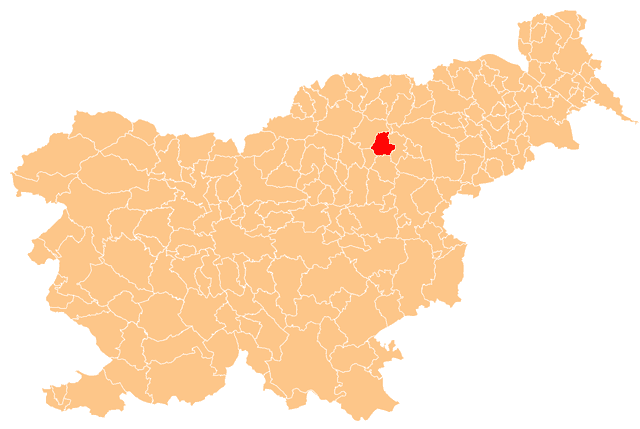
- Location of the Municipality of Vitanje in Slovenia
- Coordinates: 46°22′57″N 15°17′44″E
- Country: Slovenia

Government
  - Mayor: Slavko Vetrih

Area
  - Total: 65 km^{2} (25 sq mi)

Population (2019)
  - Total: 2,262
  - Density: 35/km^{2} (90/sq mi)
- Time zone: UTC+01 (CET)
  - Summer (DST): UTC+02 (CEST)
- Website: https://www.vitanje.si/

The Municipality of Vitanje (pronounced [ˈʋiːtanjɛ]; Slovene: Občina Vitanje) is a municipality below the slopes of Pohorje in northeastern Slovenia. Its seat is the town of Vitanje. The area is part of the traditional region of Styria. The municipality is now included in the Savinja Statistical Region.

== Geography ==
The municipality covers an area of 65 square kilometers (25 square miles).

=== Settlements ===
In addition to the municipal seat of Vitanje, the municipality also includes the following settlements:

- Brezen
- Hudinja
- Ljubnica
- Paka
- Spodnji Dolič
- Stenica
- Vitanjsko Skomarje

Vitanje and the neighboring municipalities

== Administration ==
The current mayor is Slavko Vetrih.
