= Paka, Vitanje =

Paka
- Location in Slovenia
- Coordinates: 46°25′20.18″N 15°16′25″E
- Country: Slovenia
- Traditional region: Styria
- Statistical region: Savinja
- Municipality: Vitanje

Area
  - Total: 8.63 km^{2} (3.33 sq mi)
- Elevation: 874.6 m (2,869 ft)

Population (2002)
  - Total: 252

Paka (pronounced [ˈpaːka]) is a dispersed settlement in the Municipality of Vitanje in northeastern Slovenia. The area is part of the traditional region of Styria. It lies in the hills north of Vitanje. It is now included with the rest of the municipality in the Savinja Statistical Region.
