= Vitanje =

Vitanje Vitanje Trg (until 1953)
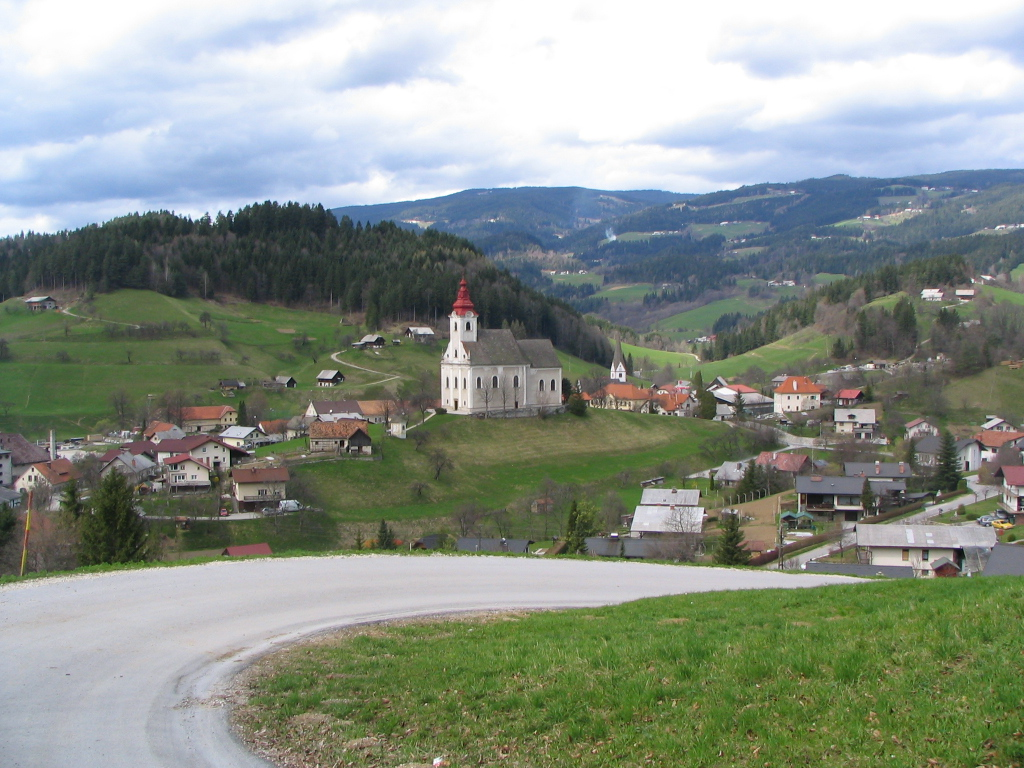

- Location in Slovenia
- Coordinates: 46°22′57″N 15°17′44″E
- Country: Slovenia
- Traditional region: Styria
- Statistical region: Savinja
- Municipality: Vitanje

Area
  - Total: 1.79 km^{2} (0.69 sq mi)
- Elevation: 449.3 m (1,474 ft)

Population (2020)
  - Total: 859

Vitanje (pronounced [ˈʋiːtanjɛ], formerly Vitanje trg, sometimes Vitanjski trg, German: (Markt) Weitenstein) is a small town in northeastern Slovenia. It is the seat of the Municipality of Vitanje. It lies on the Hudinja River north of Celje. The area is part of the traditional region of Styria and is now included in the Savinja Statistical Region. From the 11th century onwards it became a regional centre and was granted market rights in 1306.

== History ==
In 1953, the main settlement of Vitanje Trg was merged with neighboring Vitanje Vas to create the combined settlement of Vitanje.

== Church ==
The parish church in the settlement stands in Vitanje Vas and is dedicated to Saints Peter and Paul. It belongs to the Roman Catholic Diocese of Celje. Its nave dates to the early 13th century with 14th-century frescos, a 15th-century sanctuary, and 18th-century side chapels. A second church in the settlement is dedicated to Mary Help of Christians. It was built between 1747 and 1754 and its spire heightened in 1812.

== Cultural centre ==
In 2012, the Cultural Centre of European Space Technologies (KSEVT) was built in Vitanje. The building is on the one hand the main cultural venue of Vitanje and on the other hand an institute for composite research of art and science in space. The KSEVT organizes research activities, exhibitions, conferences, symposia, and educational workshops.
