= Zice =

Žiče or Žice may refer to:

Žiče [ˈʒiːtʃɛ]

- Žiče, Slovenske Konjice, a village in the Municipality of Slovenske Konjice, northeastern Slovenia
- Žiče Charterhouse, a charterhouse near Žiče, (Municipality of Slovenske Konjice)
- Žiče, Domžale, a village in the Municipality of Domžale, northern Slovenia
- Žice, a village in the Municipality of Sveta Ana, northeastern Slovenia
