= Trebnik Mansion =

Slovenian mansion

Coordinates: 46°20′5.65″N 15°25′7.82″E

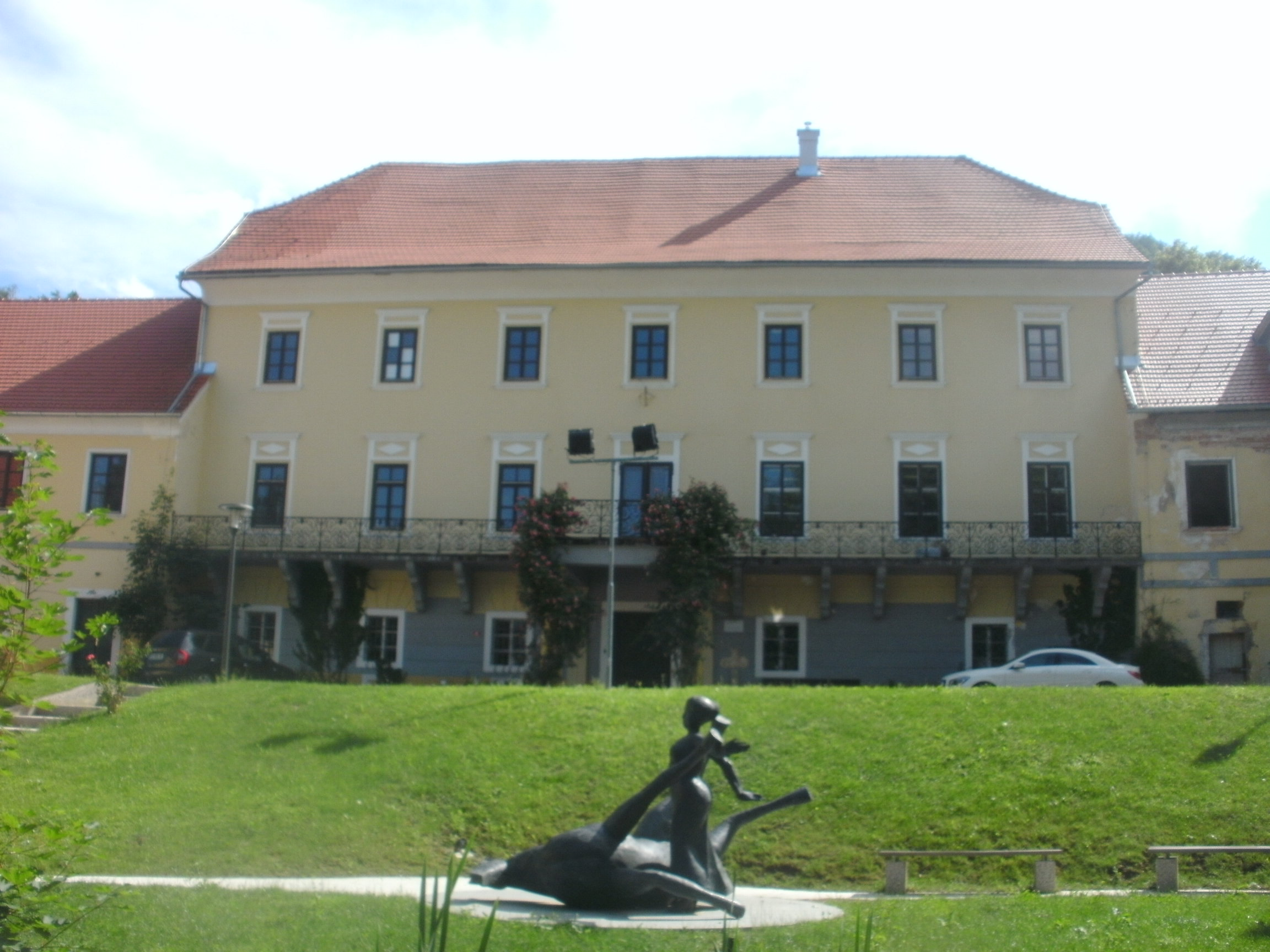
Trebnik Mansion

Trebnik Mansion (Slovene: Dvorec Trebnik) is a mansion located in the park above Saint George's Church in Slovenske Konjice, Slovenia.

== Architecture ==
The mansion comprises two building tracts and their basements; the northern tract had open arcaded passageways on the ground and first floors, dating to the 17th century. The surrounding grounds contained once-rich garden with botanically interesting tree species and shrubs, two ponds and several associated buildings, such as gardening outbuilding with Orangery, now mostly deserted or serving other purposes. The park once also featured a decorative straw-roofed rustic farmhouse (Miniatur-Bauernhäuschen), for children to work and play.

== History ==
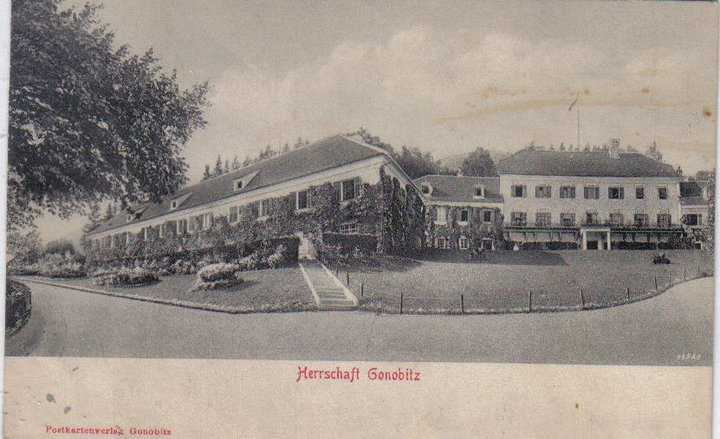
Old postcard of Trebnik Mansion (1920)

First mansion below Mount Konjice Slovene: Konjiška gora) was mentioned as early as 1362, held until the 17th century by the barons Trebnik, who sold it to the counts Tattenbach. Today's mansion was built between 1630 and 1636 by Johann Christoph von Tattenbach. After Tattenbach's the mansion was owned by kaiser and then the Žiče Charterhouse until abolition of monastery in 1782. Beside counts Tattenbach the most famous owners of the mansion were Princes of Windischgrätz, princes who used Trebnik as their summer residence. The family remained its owner until the end of World War II when the manion was nationalised by the state.

In the post-war period, the mansion was used for various purposes, it included an inn, kindergarten, a home of elderly people, a music school, and so on. Similarly, like other historical building heritage in Slovenia was not properly maintained. In 1996, it was transferred from the municipal property to the property of a company that undertook to renovate it, but did not have any interest or assets, but even burdened the real estate with bank loans and mortgages, leaving the manor almost to collapse, until the ownership and renewal in 2012 was taken over by the Municipality of Slovenske Konjice.

== Trebnik Mansion today ==
The mansion's northern tract, once known as Berzirzgang (now Dvor Trebnik) is fully renovated, there is smaller multifunctional hall, named by princess Christiane, and some medicinal offices, some rooms in the top floor are ready to rent (by the local TIC Tourist Information Centre).

Most of the southern tract (main building) with balcony wasput to were the manufacture and shop of products from medicinal herbs under the trademark Dvorec Trebnik, now there is music school again.

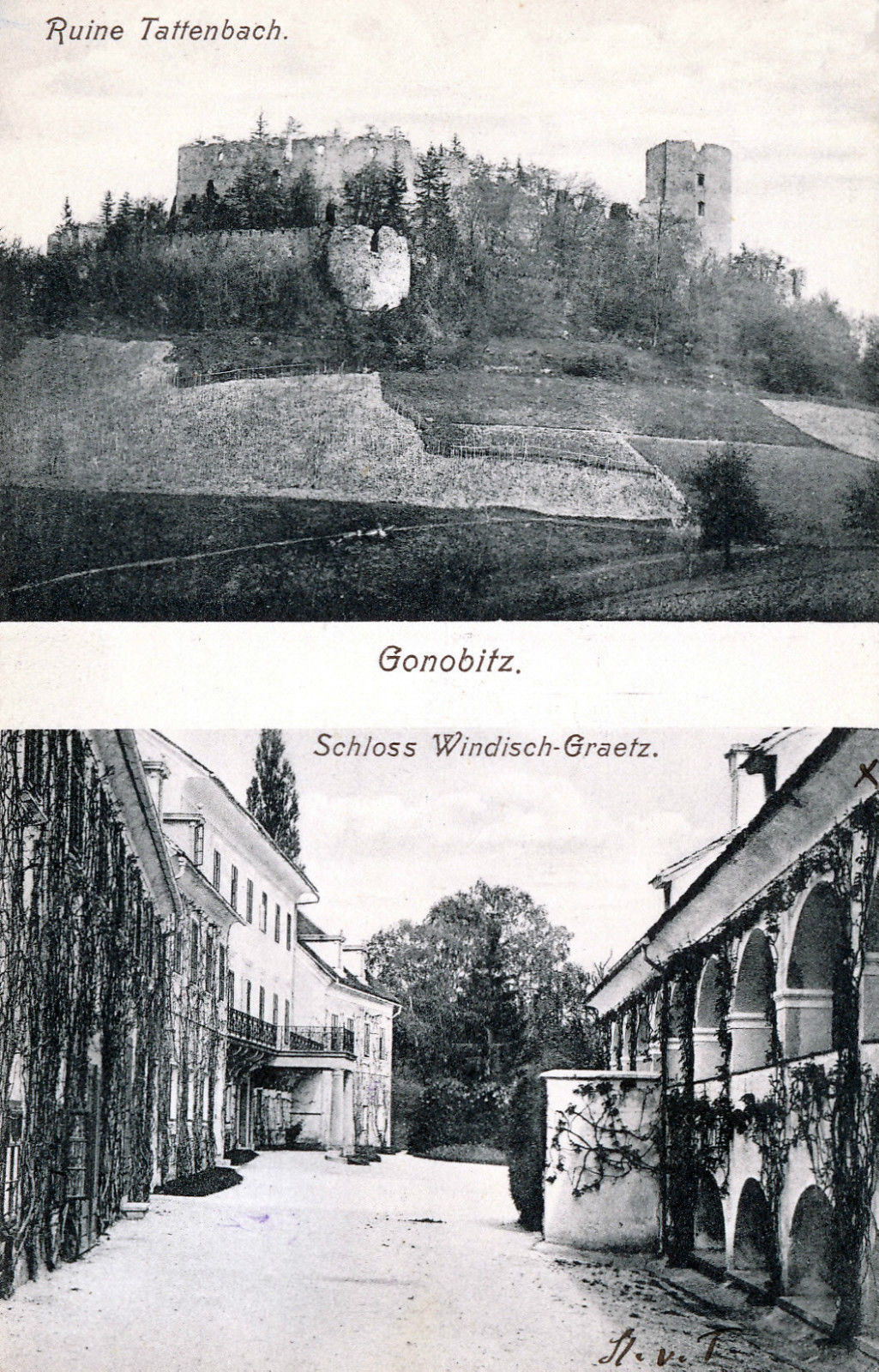
Trebnik Mansion in 1908

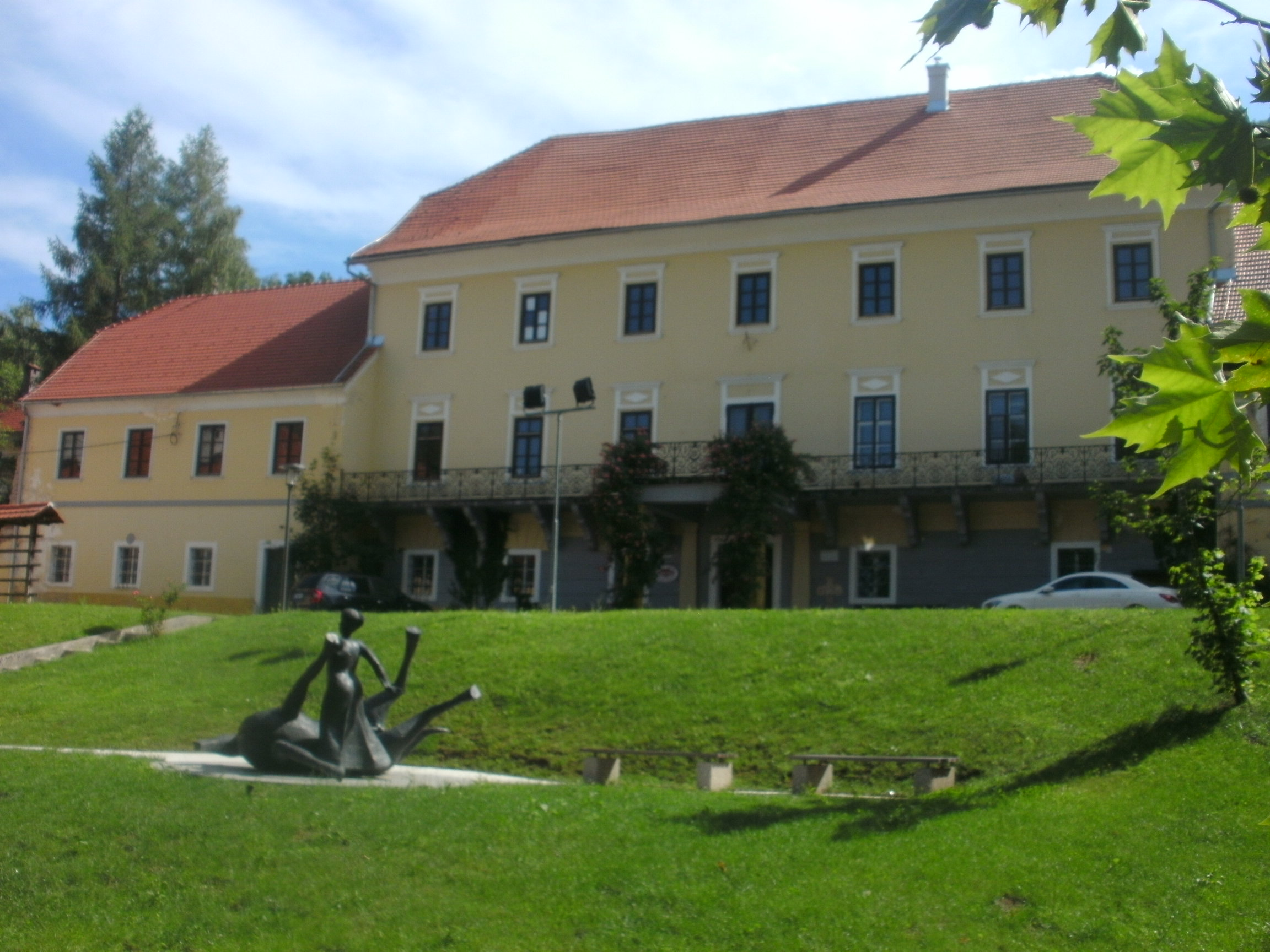
Trebnik Mansion's main building with balcony

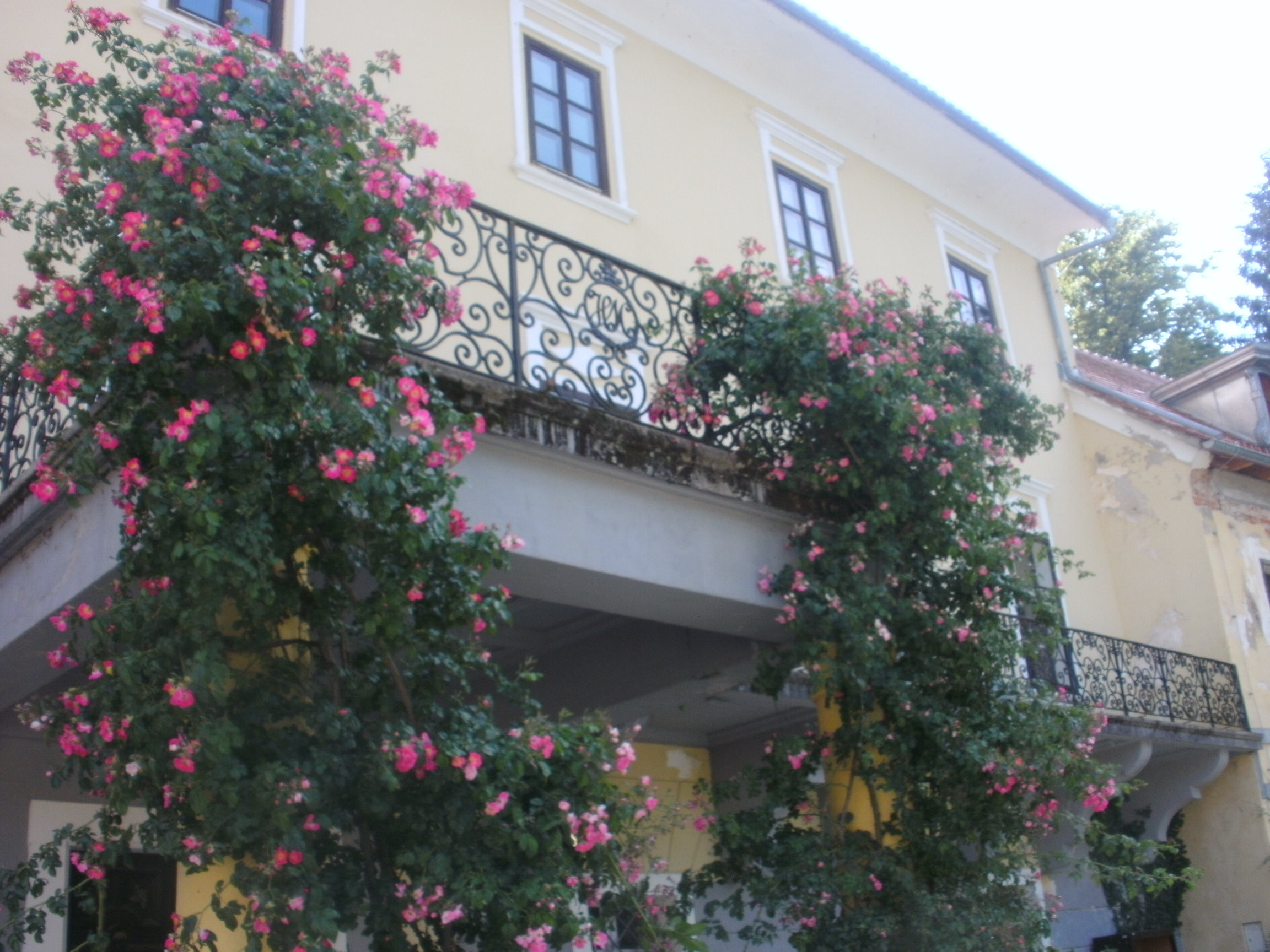
Balcony

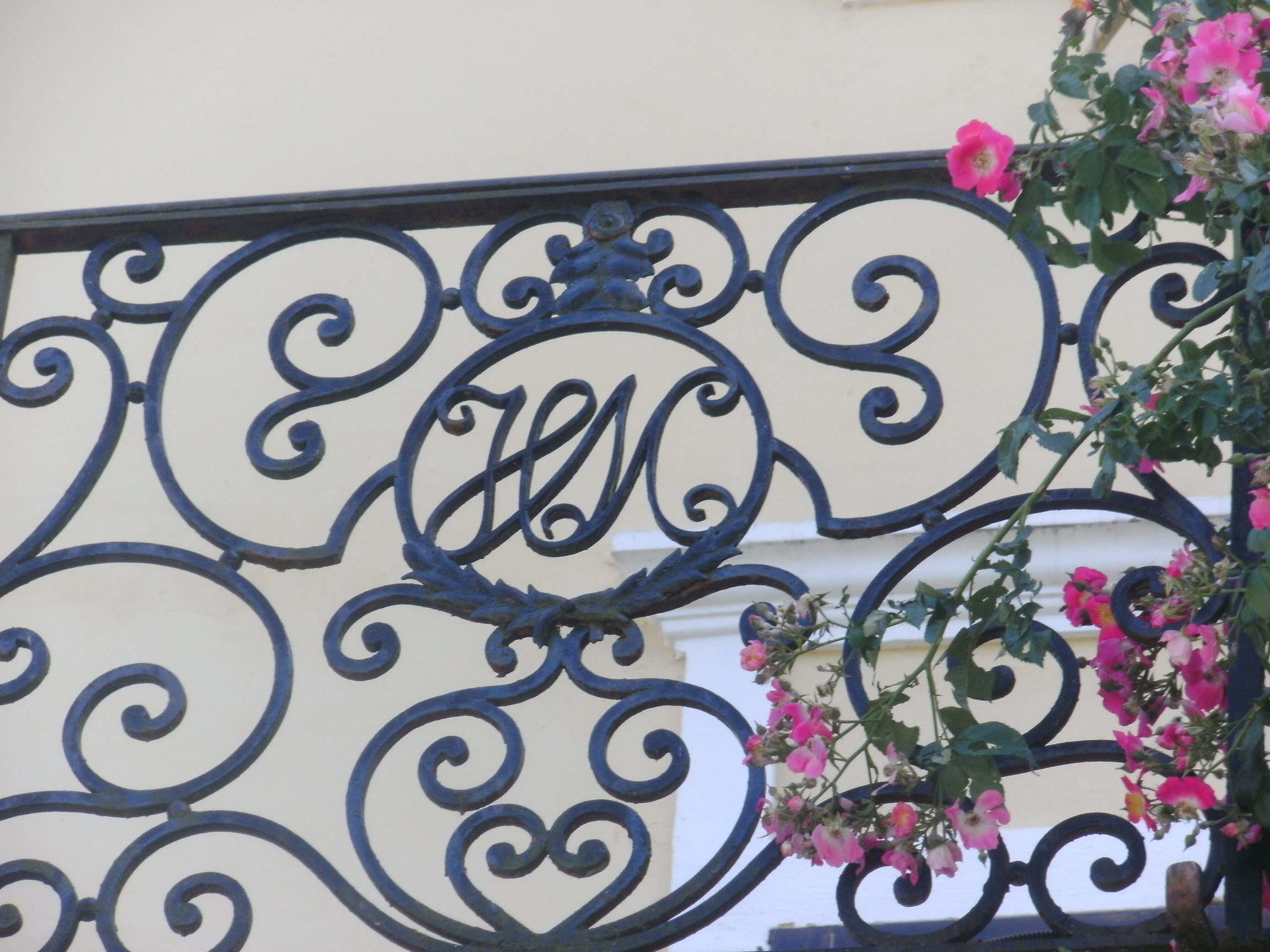
Prince Hugo Windischgraetz's and Princess Christiane Auersperg's monogram on the balcony

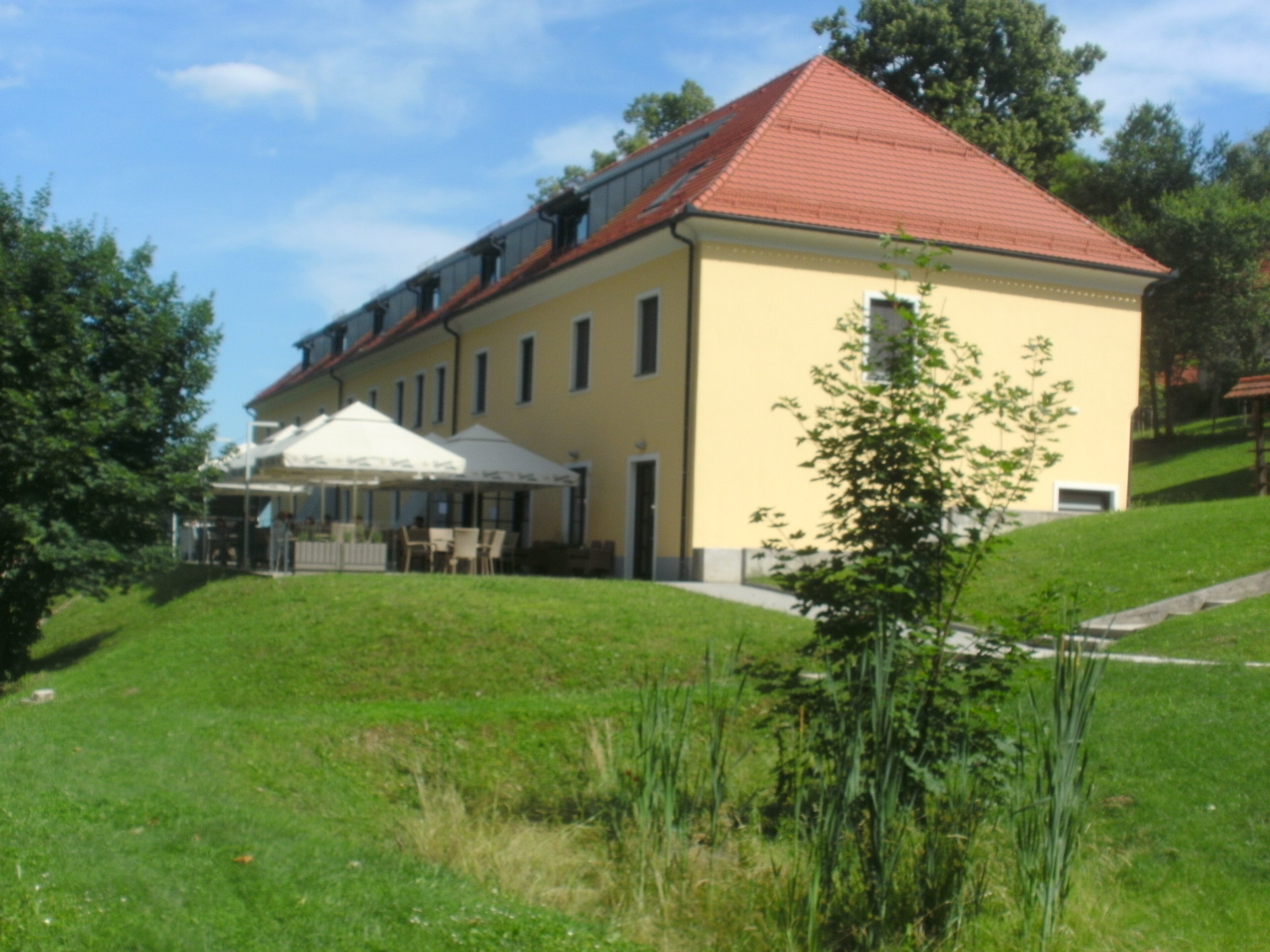
Trebnik Mansion's northern tract, called Dvor Trebnik
