= Špitalič pri Slovenskih Konjicah =

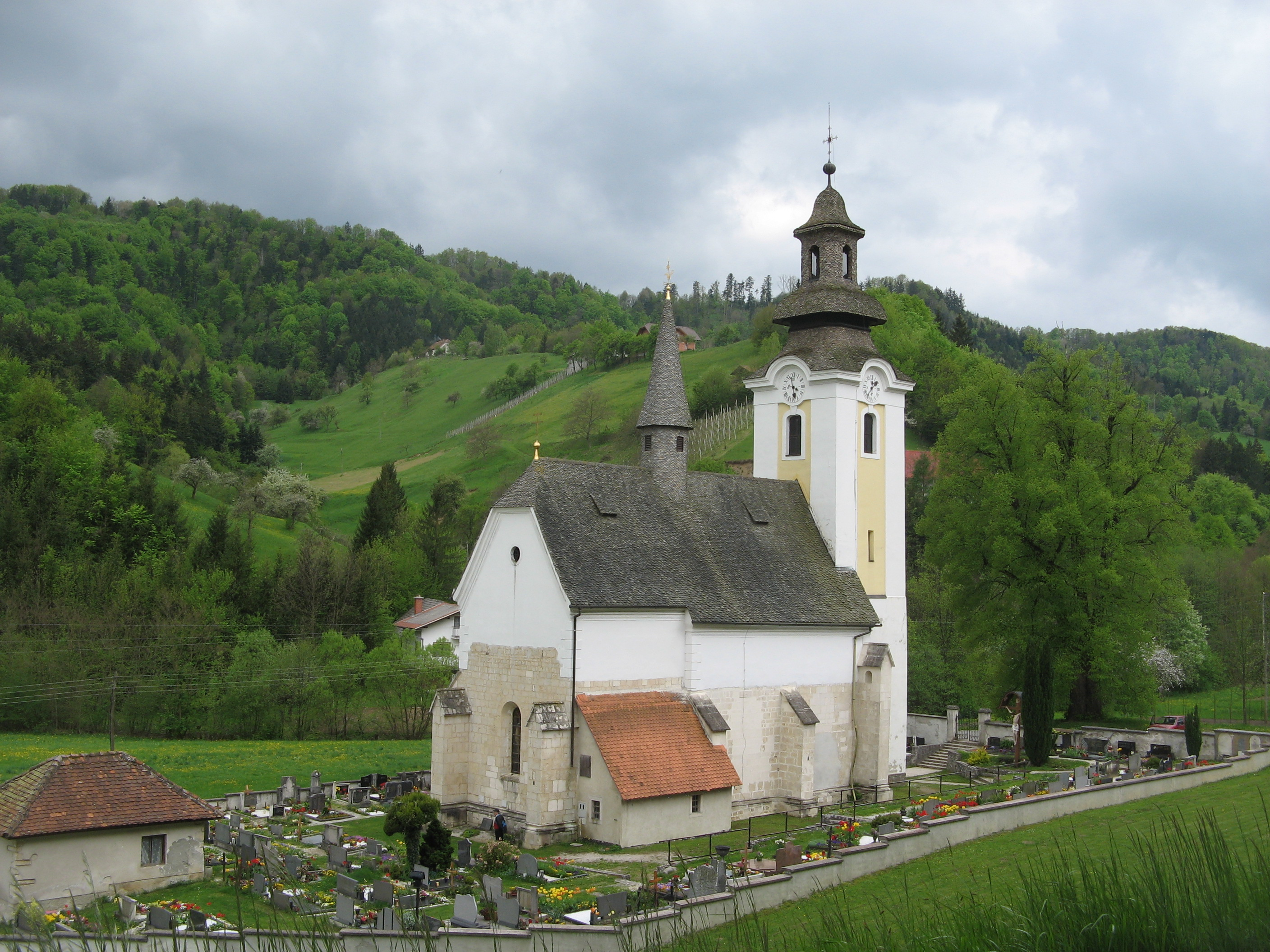

- Location in Slovenia
- Coordinates: 46°18′33.14″N 15°24′47.75″E
- Country: Slovenia
- Region: Styria
- Statistical region: Savinja
- Municipality: Slovenske Konjice
- Elevation: 372.3 m (1,221 ft)

Population (2002)
  - Total: 19

Špitalič pri Slovenskih Konjicah (pronounced [ʃpiˈtaːlitʃ pɾi slɔˈʋeːnskix kɔˈnjiːtsax]) is a small village in the Municipality of Slovenske Konjice in the Styria region of Slovenia.

The church in the village, dedicated to the Visitation of the Blessed Virgin Mary, is the only remaining part of the Ecclesia minor (lay monastery) associated with the nearby Carthusian monastery.
