= Žiče, Slovenske Konjice =

Žiče
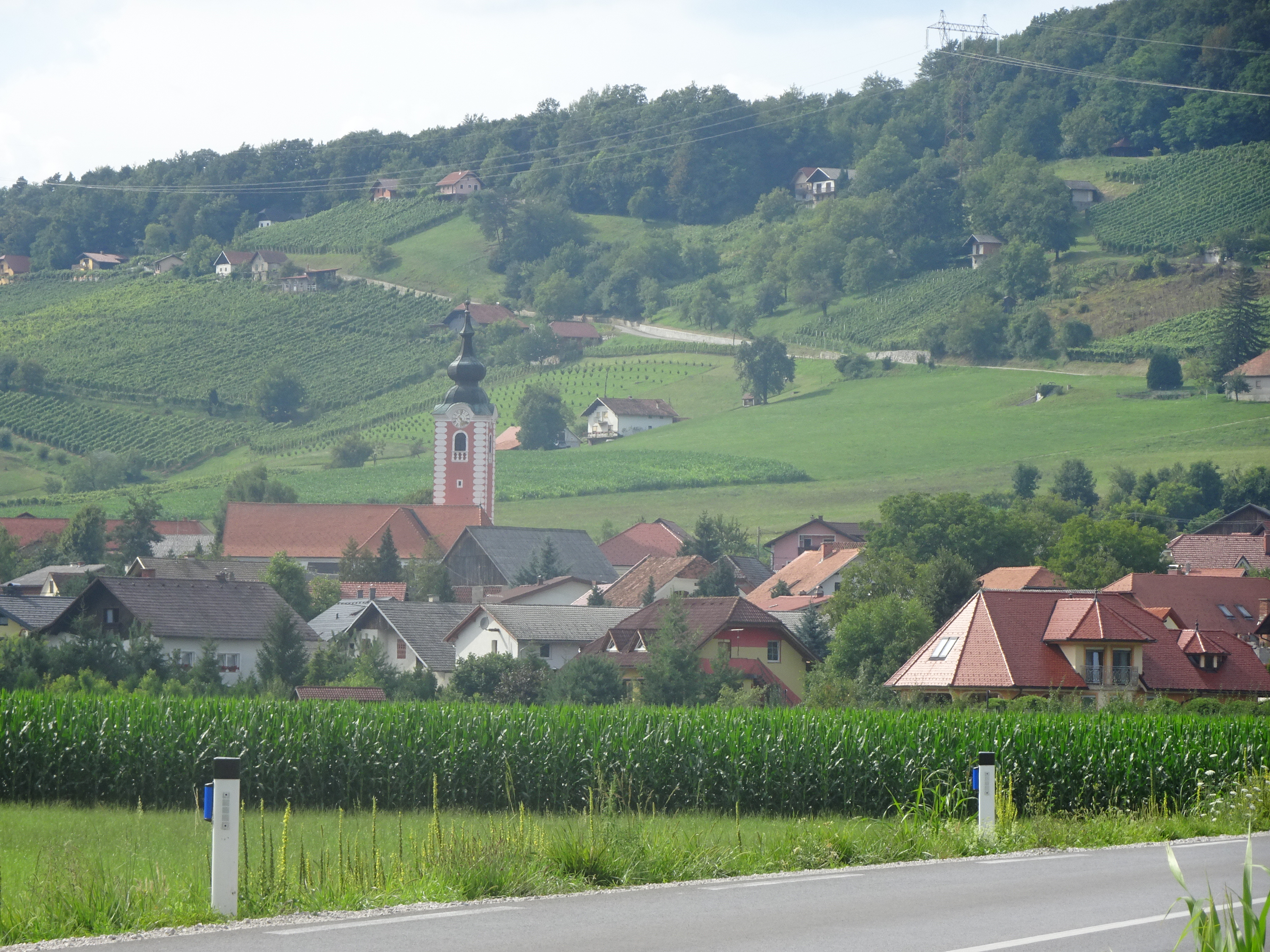

- Location in Slovenia
- Coordinates: 46°18′55.46″N 15°28′43.11″E
- Country: Slovenia
- Traditional region: Styria
- Statistical region: Savinja
- Municipality: Slovenske Konjice

Area
  - Total: 4.67 km^{2} (1.80 sq mi)
- Elevation: 279.5 m (917 ft)

Population (2002)
  - Total: 520

Žiče (pronounced [ˈʒiːtʃɛ]; German: Seitzdorf) is a village in the Municipality of Slovenske Konjice in eastern Slovenia. It lies on the right bank of the Dravinja River near its confluence with Žičnica Creek, a minor right tributary that flows just south of the village. It is best known for the Žiče Charterhouse, a 12th-century monastery that is not actually in the settlement, but 6 km further up the valley of Žičnica Creek. The area is part of the traditional region of Styria. The municipality is now included in the Savinja Statistical Region.

== Name ==
Žiče was attested in written sources in 1145 as Si^{e}tss (and as Siz in 1177, Seydes in 1184, and Seitz in 1185). The name is derived from the plural demonym *Zitъčane or *Žiťane, based on the hypocorism *Žitъko or *Žitъ, referring to an early inhabitant of the place. In the past it was known as Seitzdorf in German.

== Church ==
The parish church in the settlement is dedicated to Saint Peter and belongs to the Roman Catholic Archdiocese of Maribor. It is a 14th-century church that was rebuilt in 1660.

== Tourism ==
- 1998 The village won the European Entente Florale Bronze Medal Award.
