= Illumination (image) =

Key element in visual arts

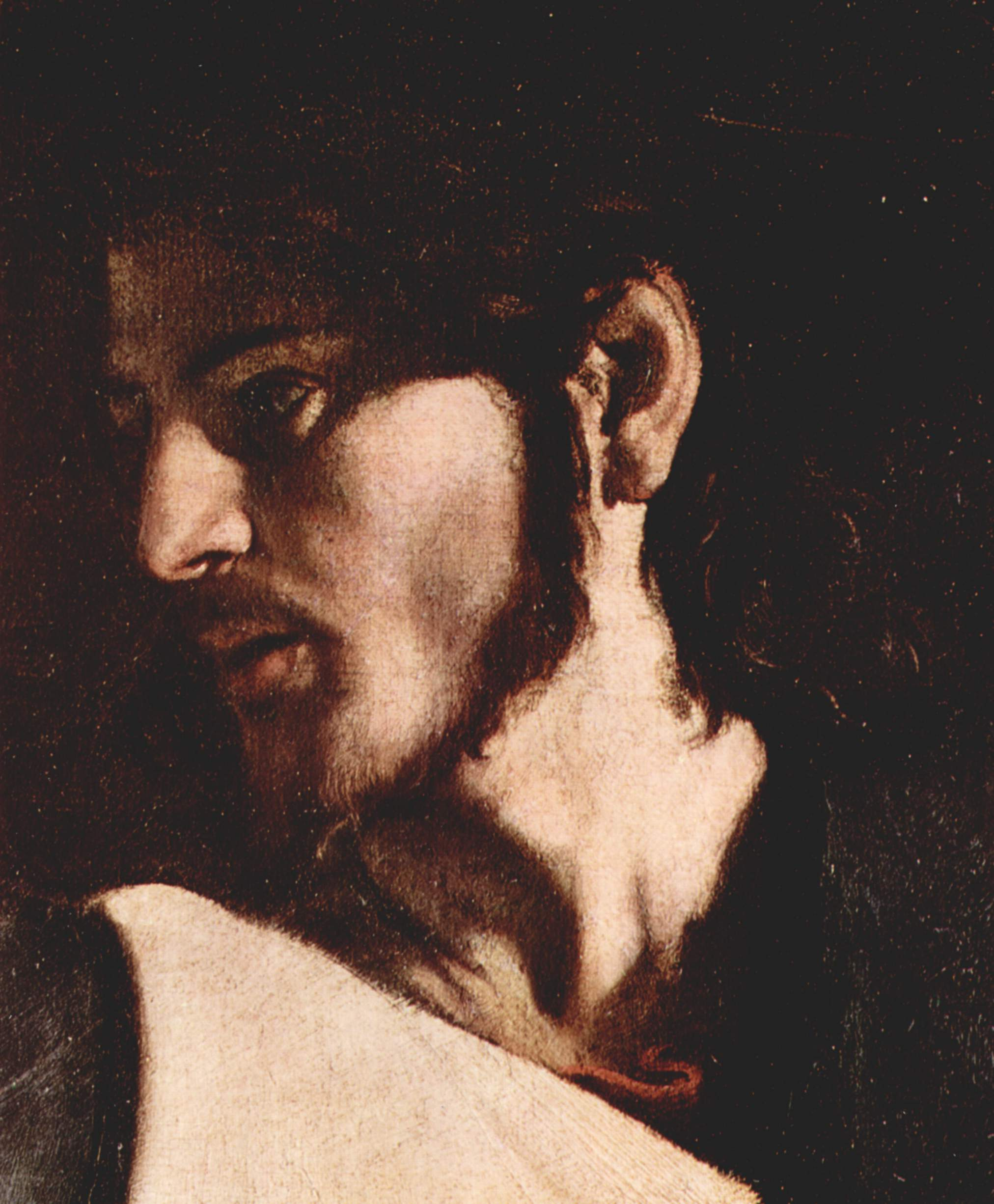
Detail from "The Calling of Matthew" by Caravaggio: a single light source casts shadows and emphasizes any variation in texture

Illumination is a concept in visual arts. By manipulating the lighting, an Artist can create a specific atmosphere for their work of art. Additionally, it can help the artist add depth to their work.

The illumination of the subject of a drawing or painting is a key element in creating an artistic piece, and the interplay of light and shadow is a valuable method in the artist's toolbox. The placement of the light sources can make a considerable difference in the type of message that is being presented. Multiple light sources can wash out any wrinkles in a person's face, for instance, and give a more youthful appearance. In contrast, a single light source, such as harsh daylight, can serve to highlight any texture or interesting features.

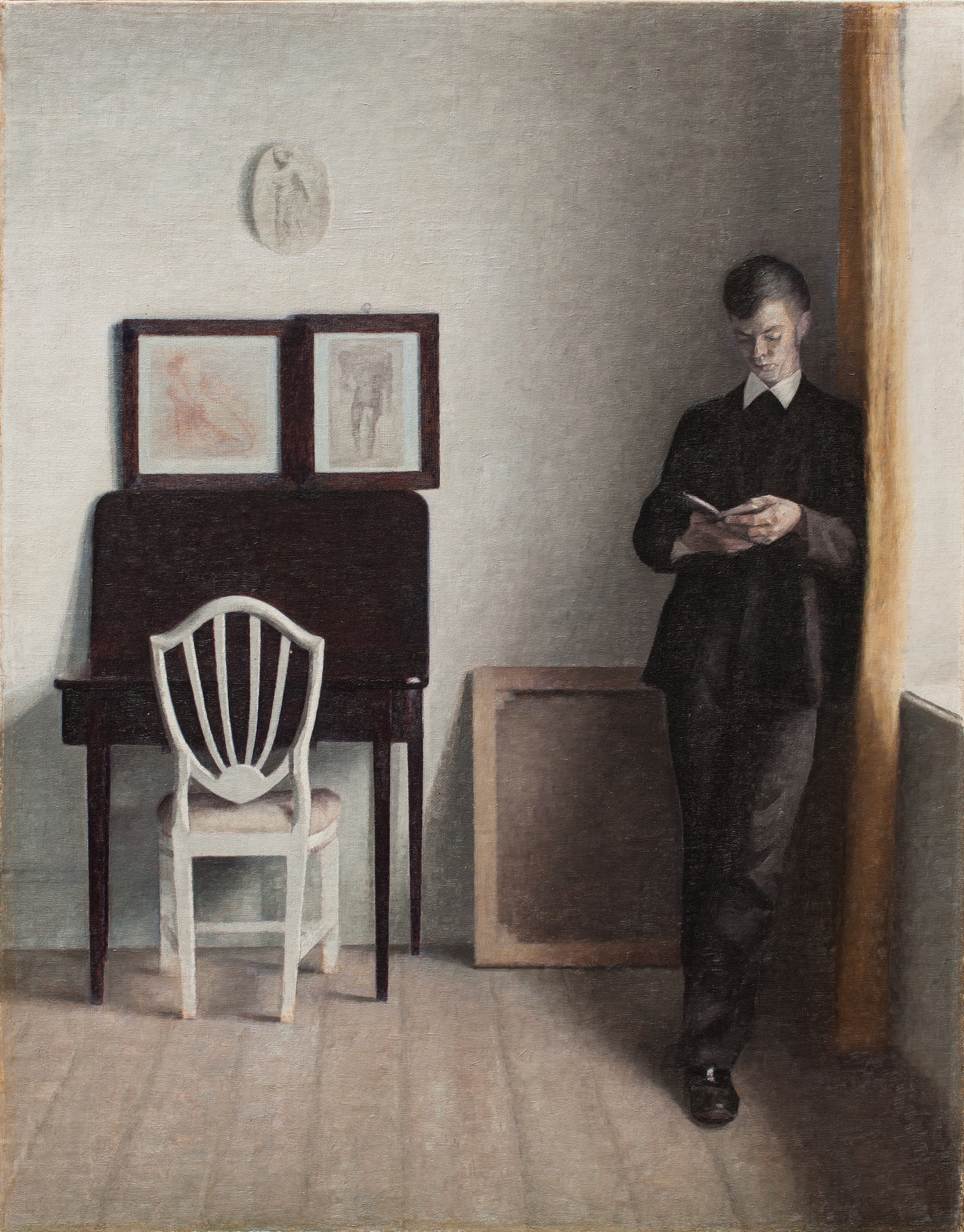
This Vilhelm Hammershøi painting is an example using diffused light, creating a softer image.

Caravaggio's early biographers, Giovanni Pietro Bellori and Joachim von Standrart both stated that Caravaggio worked in a dark room and illuminated his subjects with a single light source from above. Caravaggio's pioneering use of light and shade is known as chiaroscuro.

Processing of illumination is an important concept in computer vision and computer graphics.

== See also ==
- Chiaroscuro
