= Žiče Charterhouse =

Carthusian monastery in Slovenia

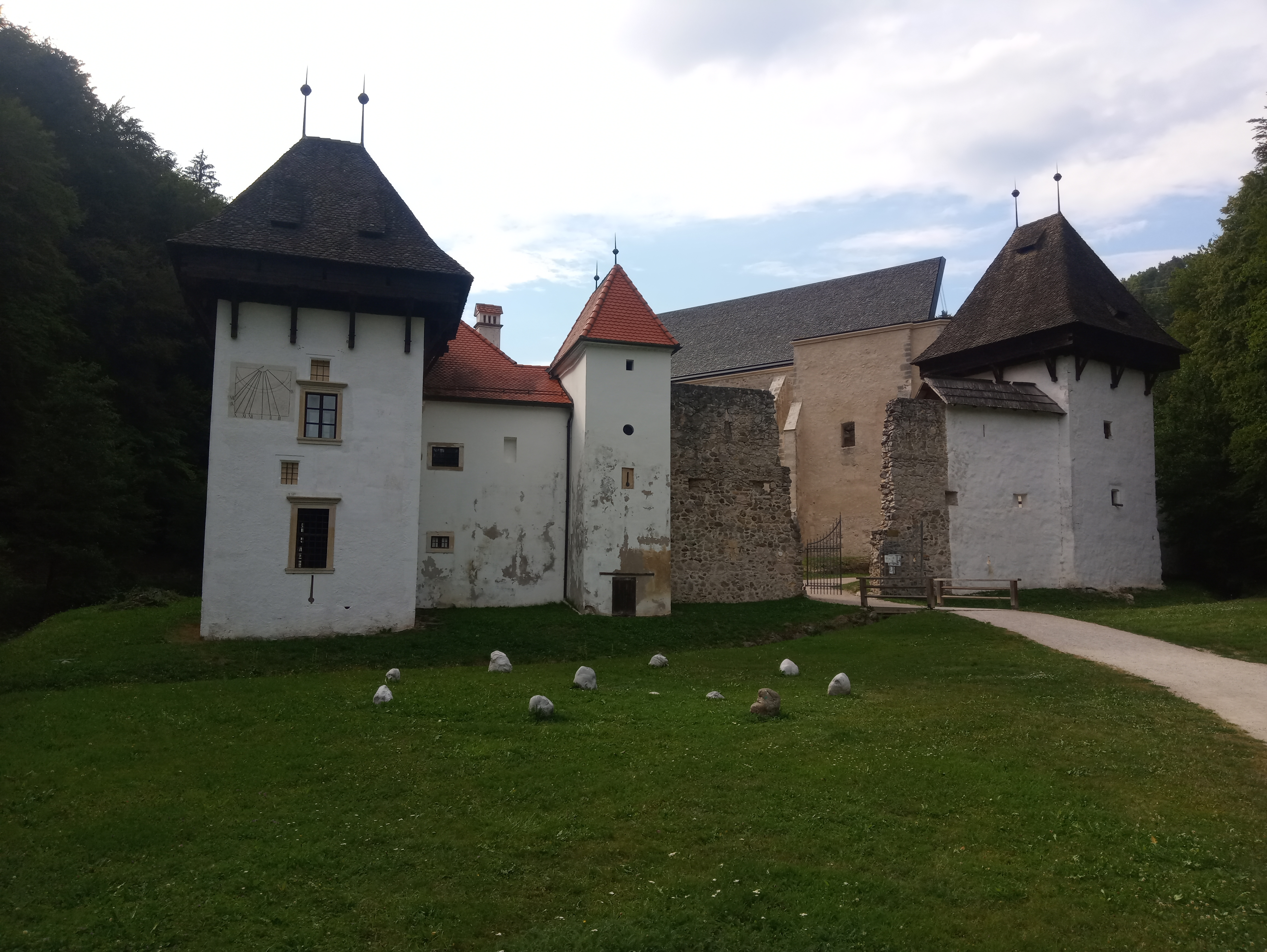

Religion
- Governing body: Municipality of Slovenske Konjice

Location
- Location: Žiče, Slovenia
- Interactive map of Žiče Charterhouse
- Coordinates: 46°18′39.96″N 15°23′33.39″E

Architecture
- Founder: Ottokar III of Styria

Žiče Charterhouse, also Seiz Charterhouse (German: Kartäuserkloster Seiz, Latin: Domus in Valle Sancti Johannis), was a Carthusian monastery or Charterhouse in the narrow valley of Žičnica Creek, also known as Saint John the Baptist Valley (Slovene: dolina svetega Janeza Krstnika) after the church dedicated to St. John the Baptist at the monastery near the village of Žiče (German: Seitzdorf) and at settlement Špitalič pri Slovenskih Konjicah in the Municipality of Slovenske Konjice in northeastern Slovenia.

The Žiče Charterhouse was the first Carthusian monastery in the German sphere of influence of the time, and also the first outside France or Italy.

== Charterhouse foundation and foundation deed ==
The Žiče Charterhouse was founded between 1155 and 1165 by Ottokar III of Styria, the Margrave of Styria, and his son, Duke Ottokar IV of Styria, of the house of Traungau, both of them were buried there. The foundation deed of Žiče Charterhouse dates back to 1165 and is archived in Styrian Provincial archive in Graz (Austria). In the last line of the deed was already written the name of Beremund, first prior of Žiče Charterhouse.

=== Pseudoetymology ===
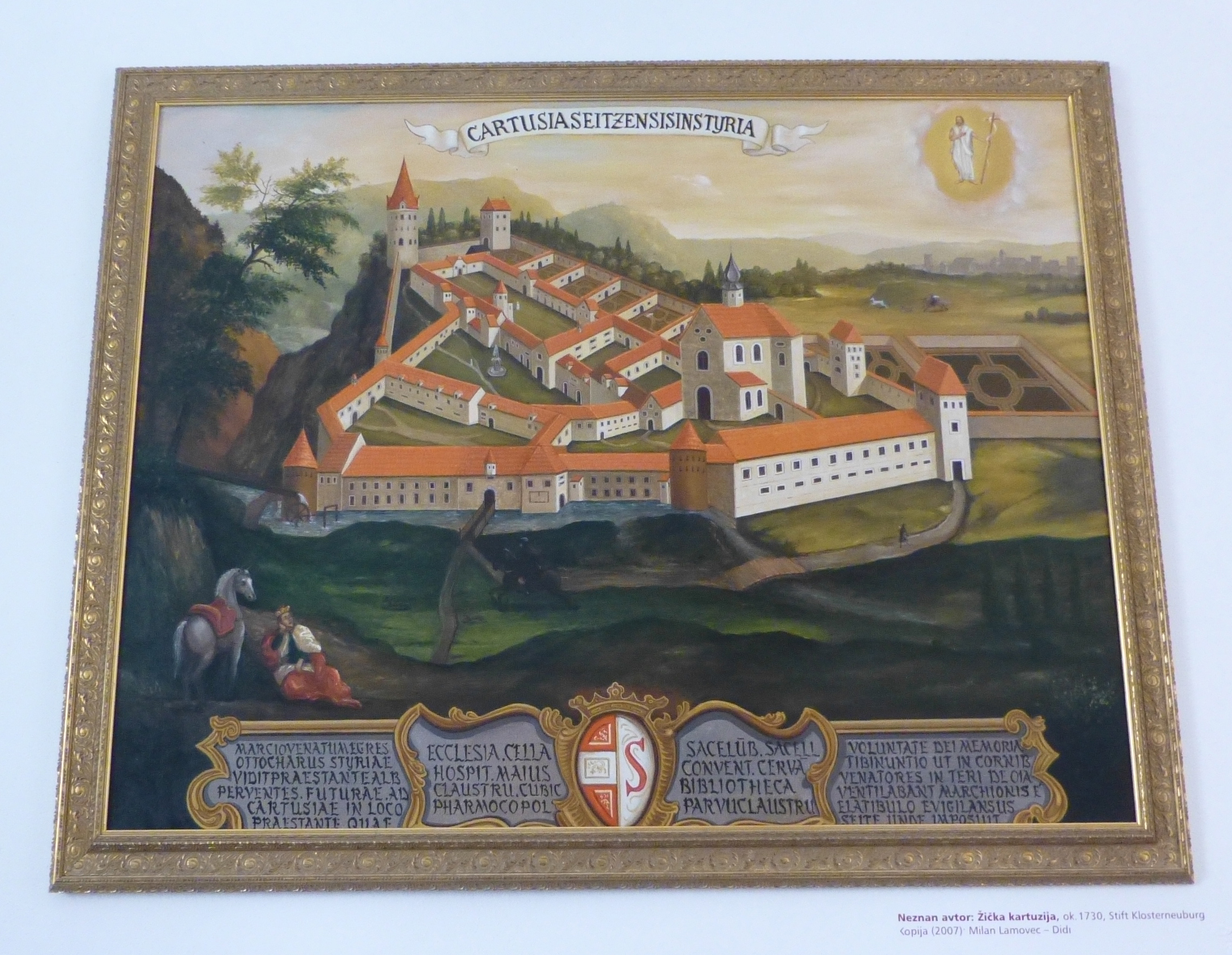
The Žiče Charterhouse in 1730

The following legend is a pseudoetymology of the monastery name. When the Margrave of Styria Ottokar III returned from the Second Crusade, he wished for some relaxation and therefore visited Leopold from Gonobitz to go hunting on Mount Konjice (Slovene: Konjiška gora). Coincidentally he came to a shady hollow in the south part of the mountain, where suddenly an extremely white hind appeared in front of him. He followed it as bewitched on his horse, but because he was not able to catch it he fell asleep in the shade on the hot summer afternoon (on St. John the Baptist's day). A man in a white fur coat appeared in his dream and revealed himself as St. John the Baptist, ordering him to build a monastery on this place. At that moment a rabbit jumped into Ottokar's lap because it was frightened by the hunter's screaming. The saint's image disappeared and Ottokar shouted: "A rabbit, look, a rabbit!" Because of this rabbit the monastery was called "Seiz Charterhouse" (the Slovenian pronunciation of rabbit, zajec, is written Seiz in German) for a long time and has the initial "S" in its coat of arms.

=== Name ===
Over the centuries, the name Žiče Charterhouse appears in early written documents in various forms: Seitz (1185), Sitze (1186, 1243), Seiz (1202, 1234), Sishe (1229), Seitis (1233), Sits (1235, 1257), Siz (1237), Syces (1240), Sic (1243), Syces (1245), Siths (1247), Seits (1257)

== Architecture of Žiče Charterhouse ==
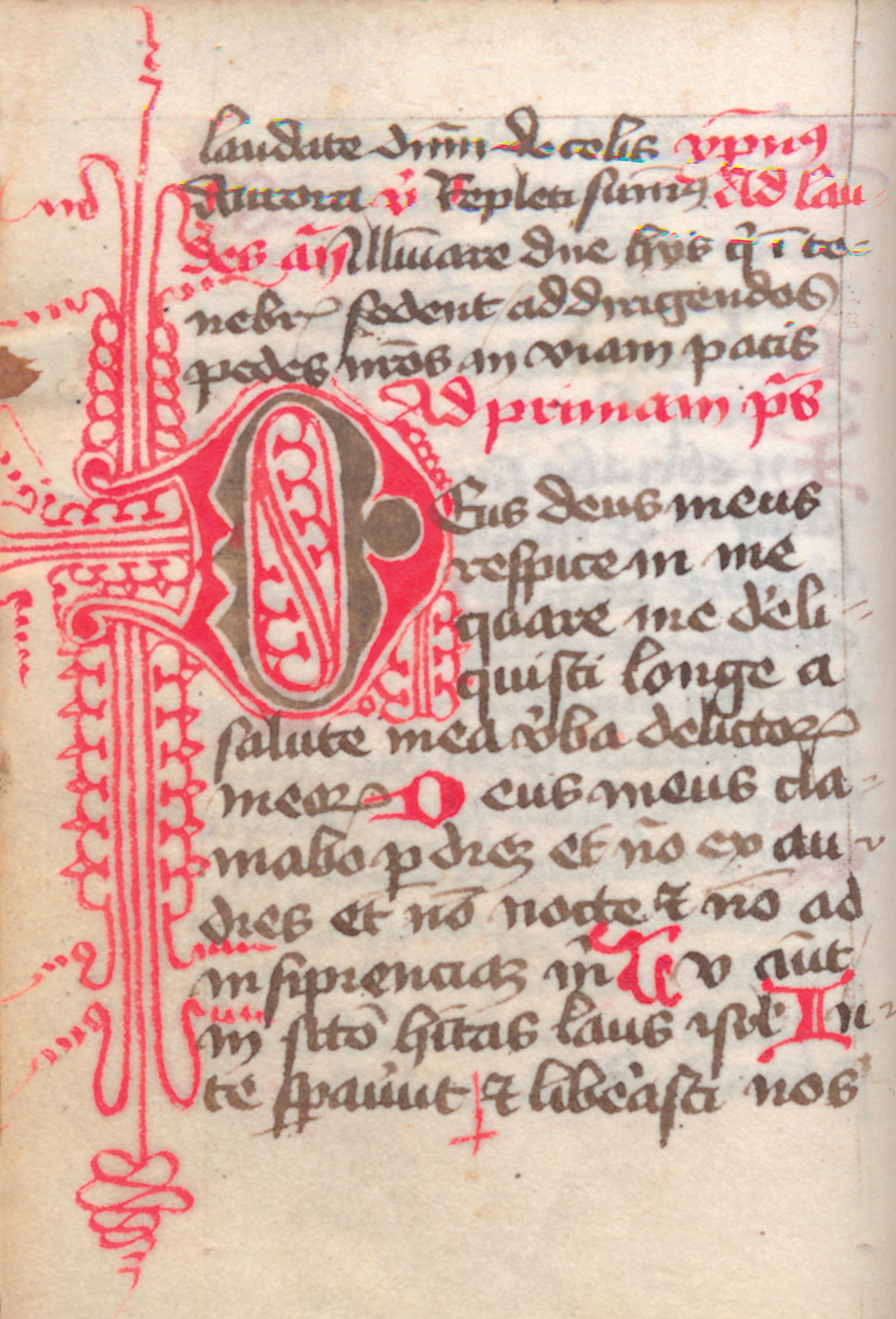
Book of Prayers, Žiče Charterhouse, 1423

Lay monk Aynard, construction master sent from Grande Chartreuse, influenced much to the arrangement of the premises. The first emergency Charterhouse buildings were built until at least 1165. The scheme or Chartusian monasteries usually comprised three basic elements: monastic church, a small cross corridor (Lesser Cloister) and a great cross corridor. As with first French charterhouses, two monasteries were built here.

Upper one (Domus Superior), where the cloister monks used to live according to the strict rule of the Carthusians, they spend time in contemplative prayer and individual work in their cells. Great Cloister linked monastic cells and there was a God's Acre also, where monks were buried. In Žiče Charterhouse there was a crucifix, placed in the middle at first. In 15th Century the crucifix was removed and replaced by cemetery chapel, where priors were buried, which has been preserved until now. Lesser Cloister linked communal rooms and served as an entrance to the St. John the Baptist church and Sacristy. Communal rooms, such as Chapter house, Refectory (common dining room), a kitchen, a Dormitory (a bedroom for lay brothers, who participated at the liturgy on holidays and Sundays) were built around the Lesser Cloister.

Lower one (Domus Inferior) in the settlement of Špitalič for the lay monks, who had less prayer and spend time in manual labor in the agriculture, winegrowing, as craftsments at grass making, sawmills, brickwork, supporting the upper monastery and contributing to its prosperity. They were mostly illiterate and listened to Holy Mass under leadership and explanations of a procurator. Despite strict order restrictions which prevented the Chartusians from direct activities among people, they were good example of charity. Lower monastery boasted so called Hospice also, where people in need were given charity, as money, clothes, food and medicine, made also of their own herbs, according to the recipes from carthusian library. All the monastic buildings in Špitalič were demolished after dissolution and only the church remained.

== History ==
The monastery was settled by Carthusian monks and lay monks from the Grande Chartreuse near Grenoble in France, led by prior Beremund, count of Cornwall, royal relative, prior of Durbon Charterhouse in Provence.

Roman Pope Urban VI at the time of the Great Schism in the western Roman Catholic Church moved to Žiče Chaterhouse the seat of the prior general of Chartusian order for almost two decades (1391-1410). Three Žiče priors, John from Bari (1391), Christopher (1391-1398) and Stephen Maconi from Siena (1398-1410) became prior general of the order, so at that time the Žiče charterhouse formed a Chartusian order top policy and made all important decisions.

=== Stephen Maconi ===
The Carthusian prior general, beatificated Stephen Maconi (prior at Žiče), a friend of Saint Catherine of Siena and big supporter of her canonization process, worked also lot to reunite his Carthusian order and charterhouses of Europe, divided in support to popes from Rome and others, supporting the antipopes from Avignon.

=== Philipp von Seitz ===
About 1300 Philipp von Seitz, also known as Bruder Philipp, der Kartäuser (German for 'Brother Philipp, the Carthusian'), reworked the epic poem Vita beate virginis Marie et salvatoris rhythmica (about 1230) at the Žiče Charterhouse, thereby creating 10,133 lines in Middle High German. Due to their humbleness, the Carthusians did not sign their work, but the postscript in dem hûs ze Seitz (Middle High German for 'in the house at Žiče') makes it clear that his poem was composed at the Žiče Charterhouse.

The monastery was attacked during an Ottoman raid in 1531. This marked the beginning of a decline in its influence and fortunes. In 1564 it passed into the hands of commendatory priors and in 1591 to the Jesuits of Graz. It was recovered by the Carthusians in 1593, after which it prospered again.

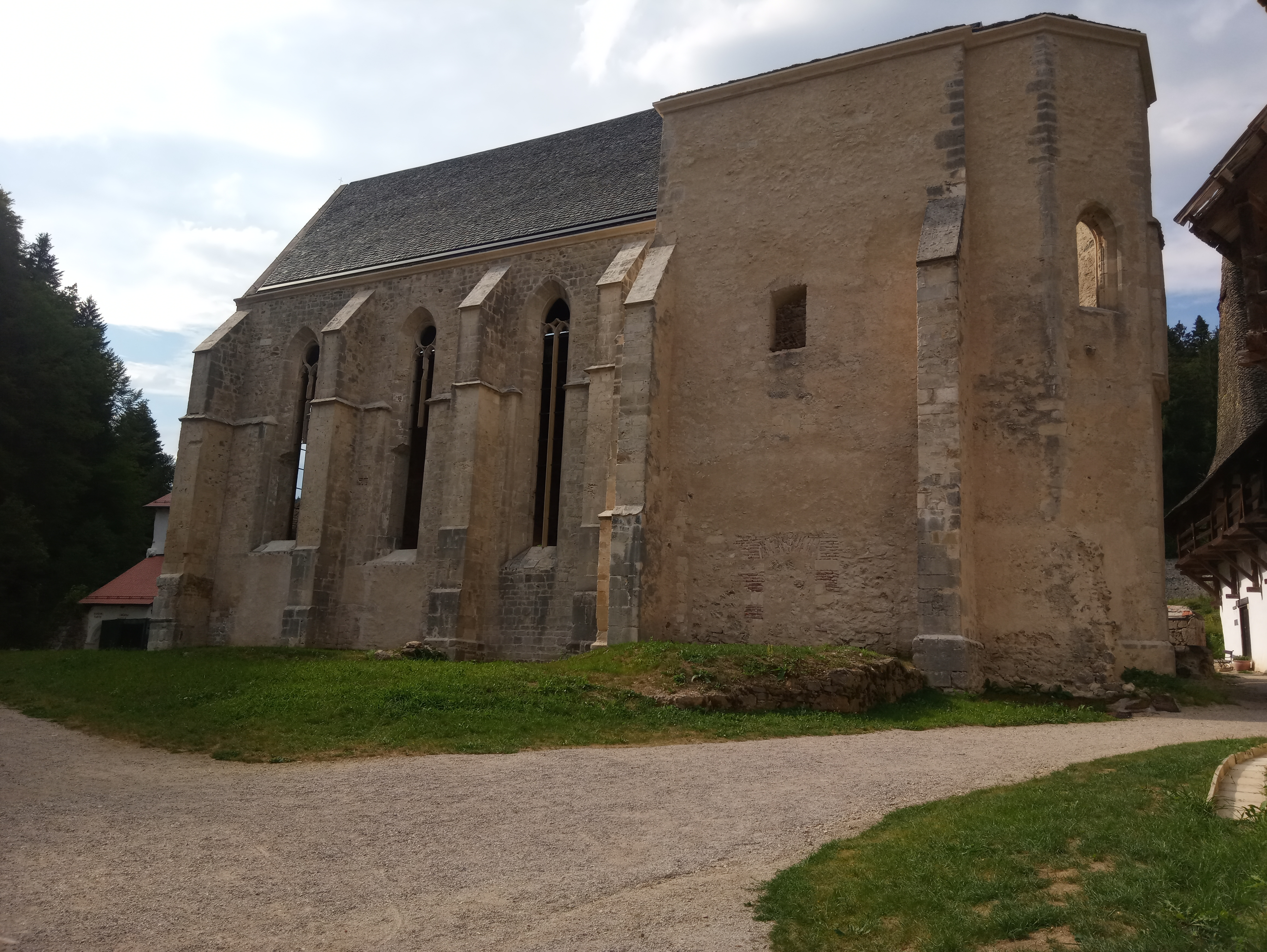
The monastic church, dedicated to Saint John the Baptist in 2022

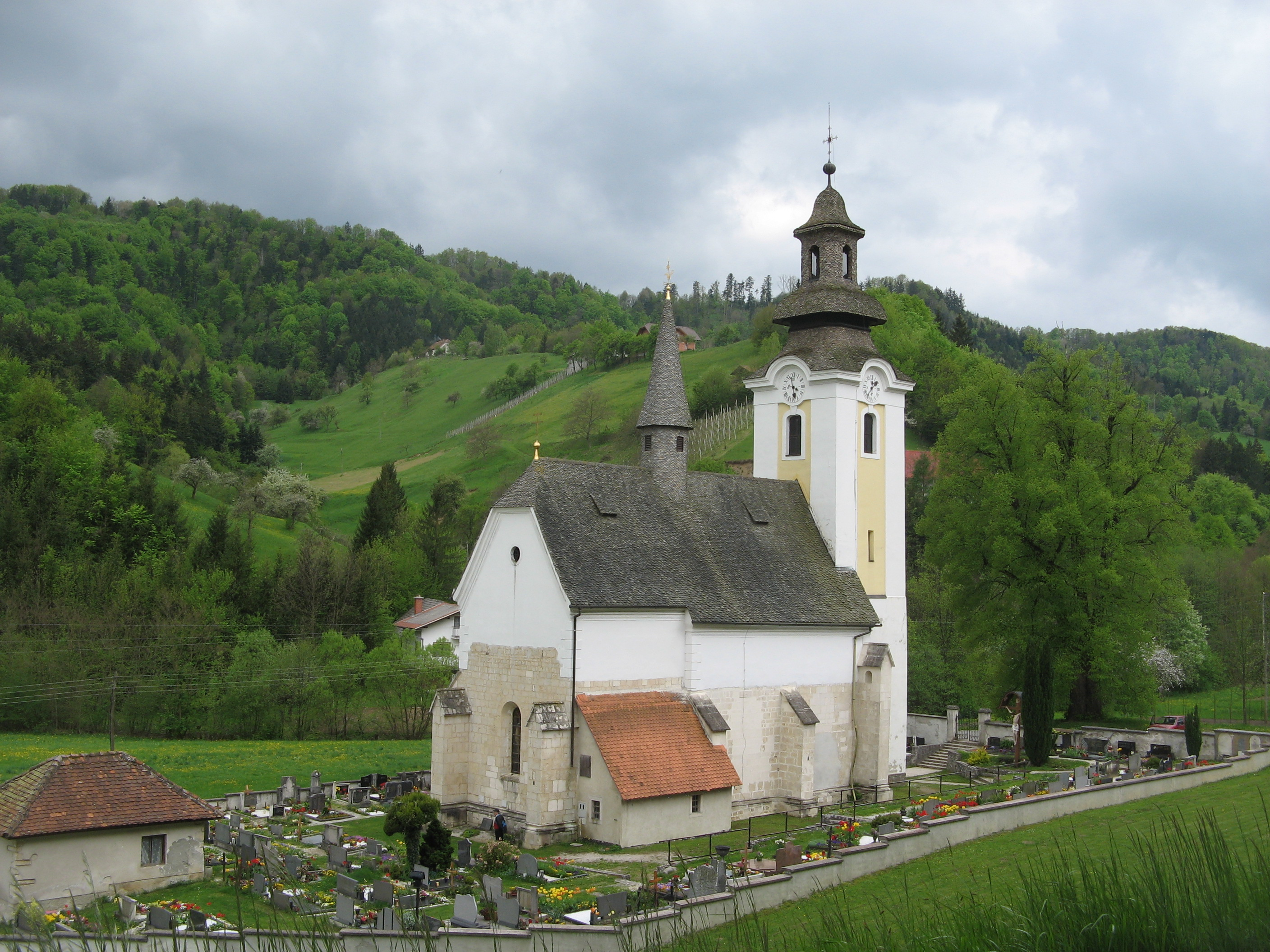
Former monastic church, now the parish church in Špitalič

In 1782 Emperor Joseph II abolished the monastery, one of the earliest to be dissolved under the Josephine Reforms. The charterhouse was allowed to fall into decay. When the charterhouse was dissolved, an inventory was also made of the Žiče pharmacy, which was equipped with a wide variety of medicines and other material.

The ruins of the Žiče Charterhouse were bought at auction from Imperial Religious Fund (Religionsfond) in 1826 by Prince Weriand of Windisch-Graetz and remained the property of this family until the end of World War II. Today's owner of the Žiče Charterhouse is the Municipality of Slovenske Konjice.

== Monastic churches ==
The monastic Carthusian church was dedicated to Saint John the Baptist (Ecclesia Maior) and consecrated on 24 October 1190 by Patriarch Godfrey.

Also monastic church of Mary's visitation in Špitalič (Ecclesia Minor) was consecrated in 1190. It was built in the French late Romanesque style and has remained almost unchanged until today.

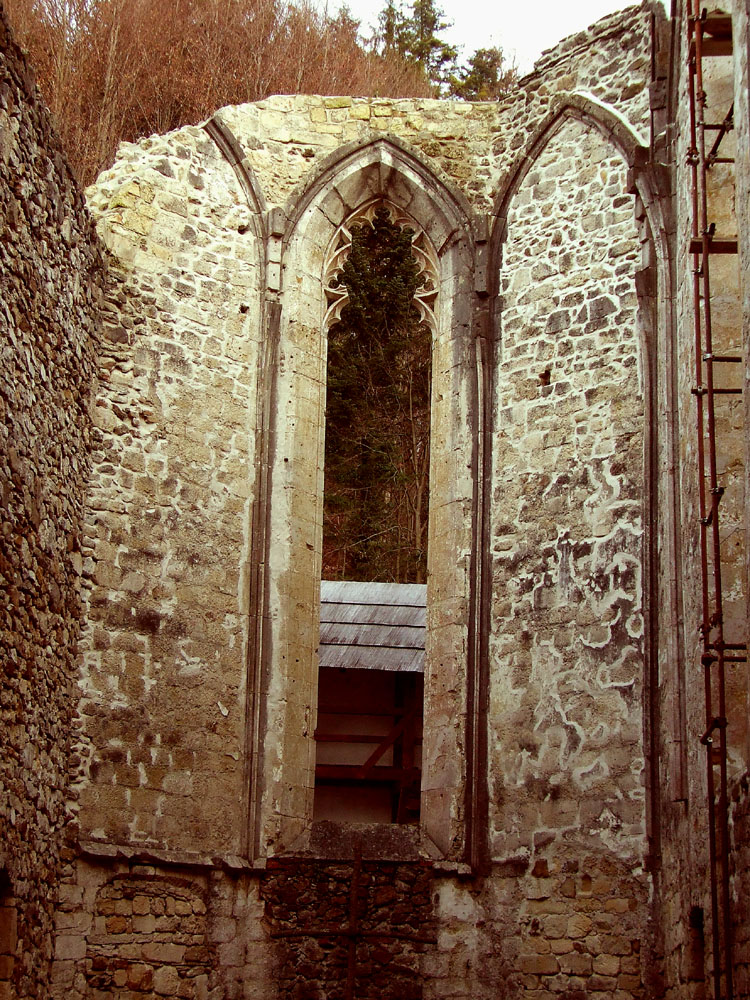
Gothic window of monastic church

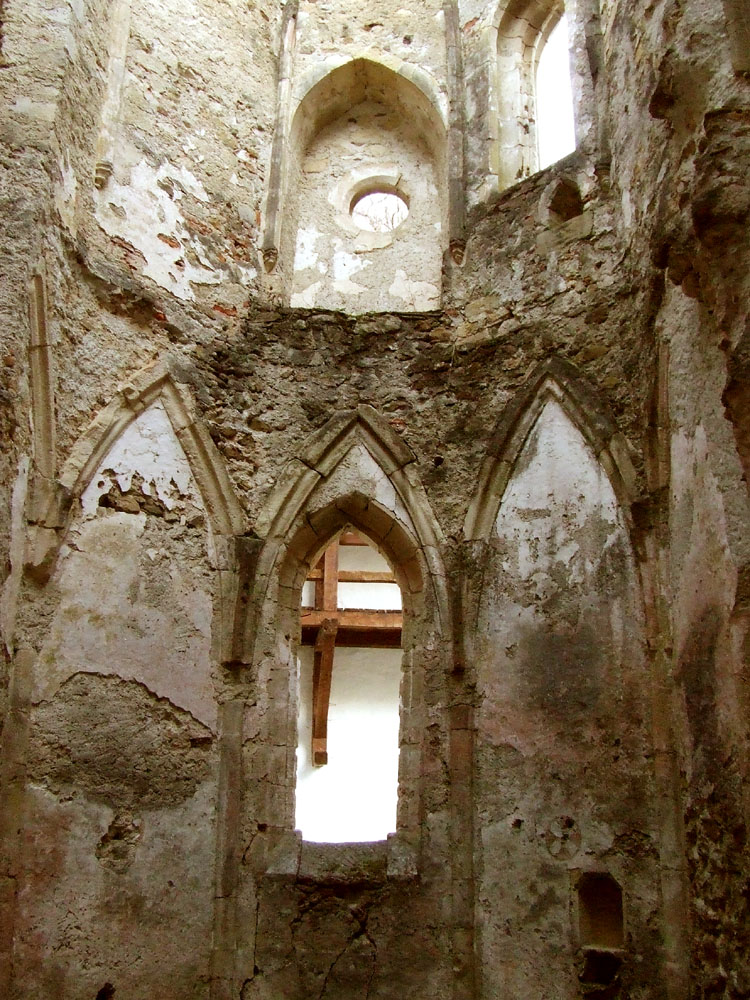
Side nave apse

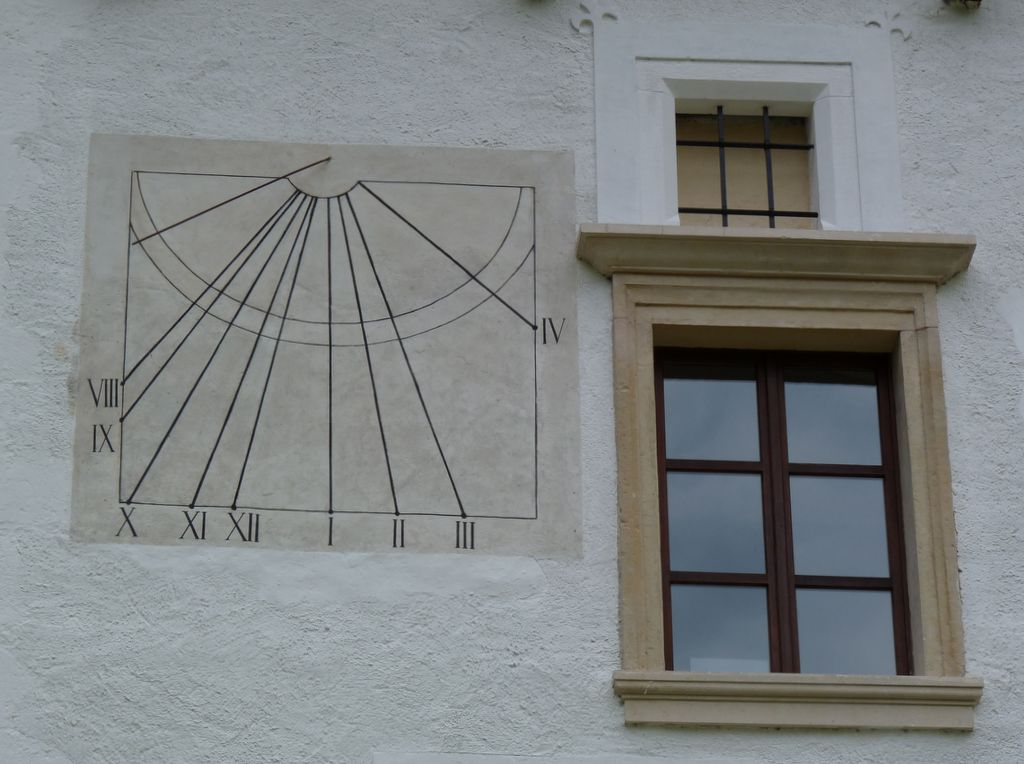
Sundial

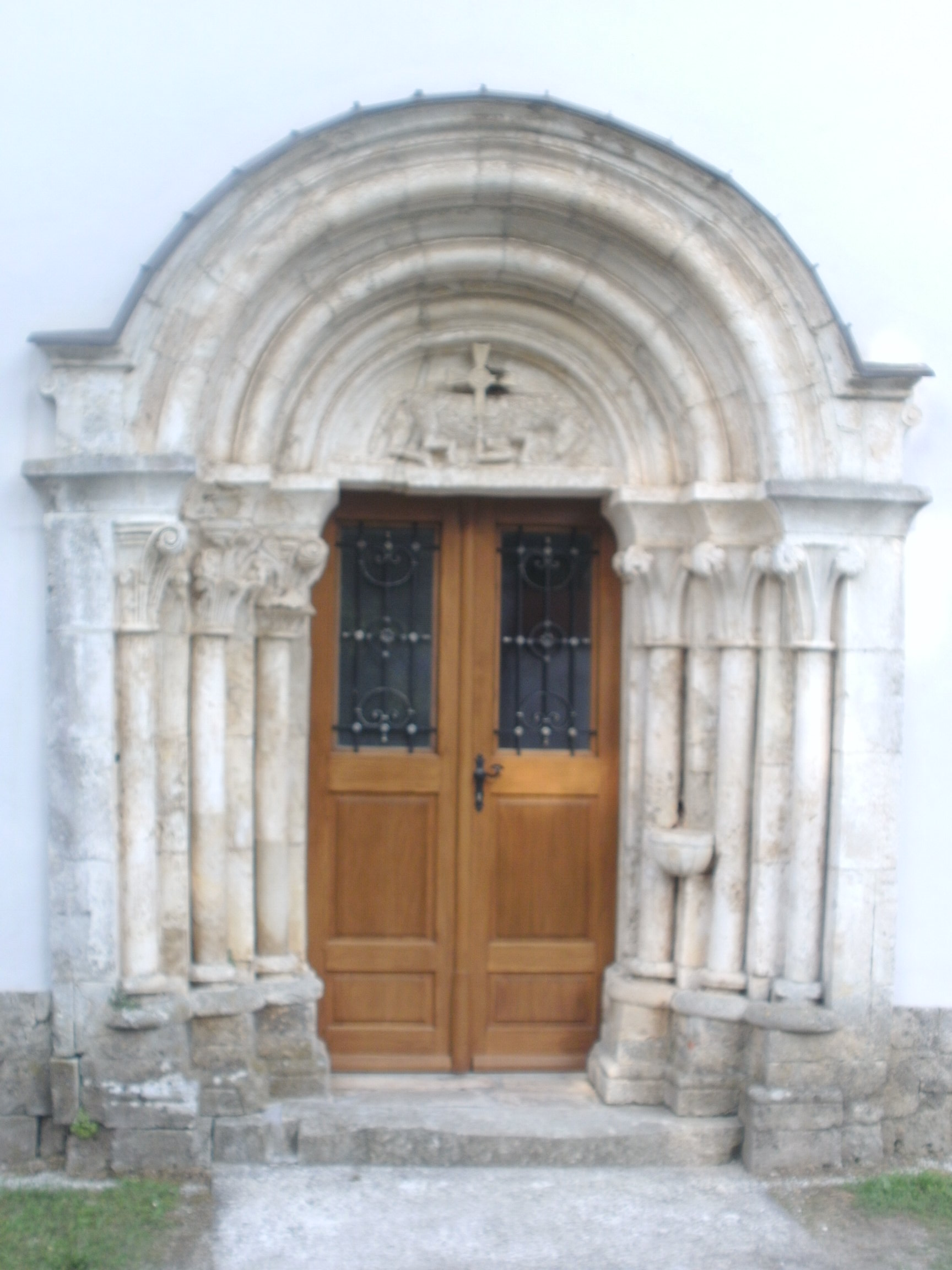
Main arch portal, Visitation Church, Špitalič

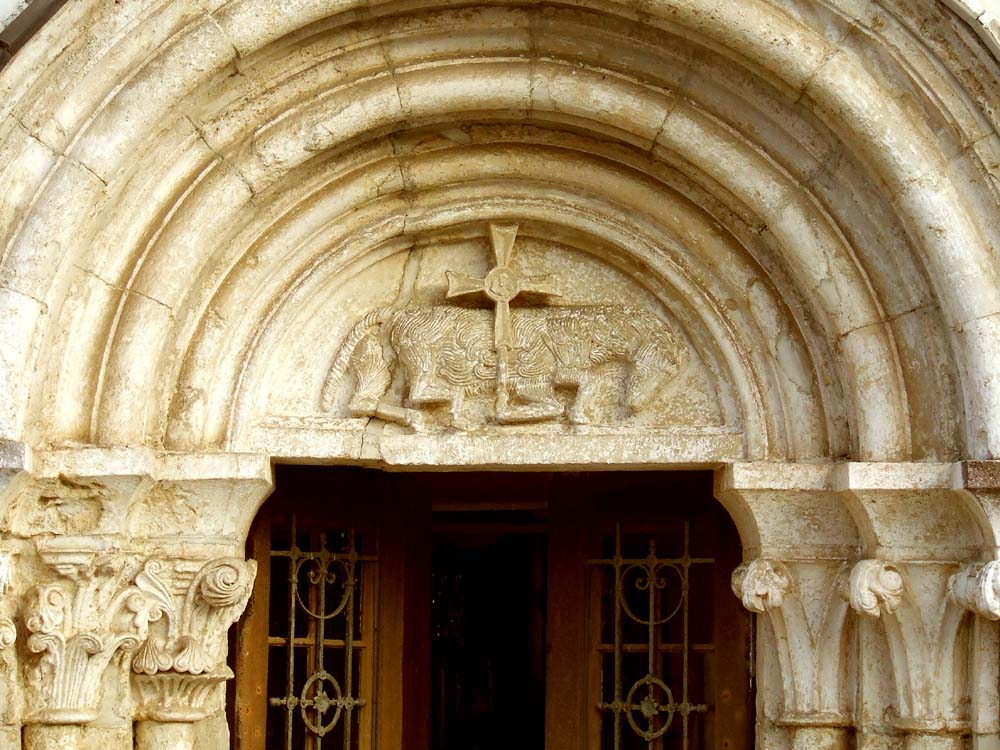
Lunette of the arch portal

== Library ==
Soon the monastery became a center of culture and politics in its territory and far beyond. On 30 May 1487, the visiting Bishop of Caorle stayed at the Žiče charterhouse as an emissary of the Patriarch of Aquileia. His secretary Paolo Santonino wrote in his Itinerary that the monks had more than 2,000 volumes (mostly manuscripts) which was larger than all but the Vatican Library. Now only 120 are known, with fragments of a further 100 or so. In the mid-16th century, as the result of a number of tragic events in the preceding half-century, the monastery was nearly abandoned and Archduke Charles II of Styria ordered the books to be moved to the library of the Jesuit College in Graz.

=== Žiče manuscripts ===
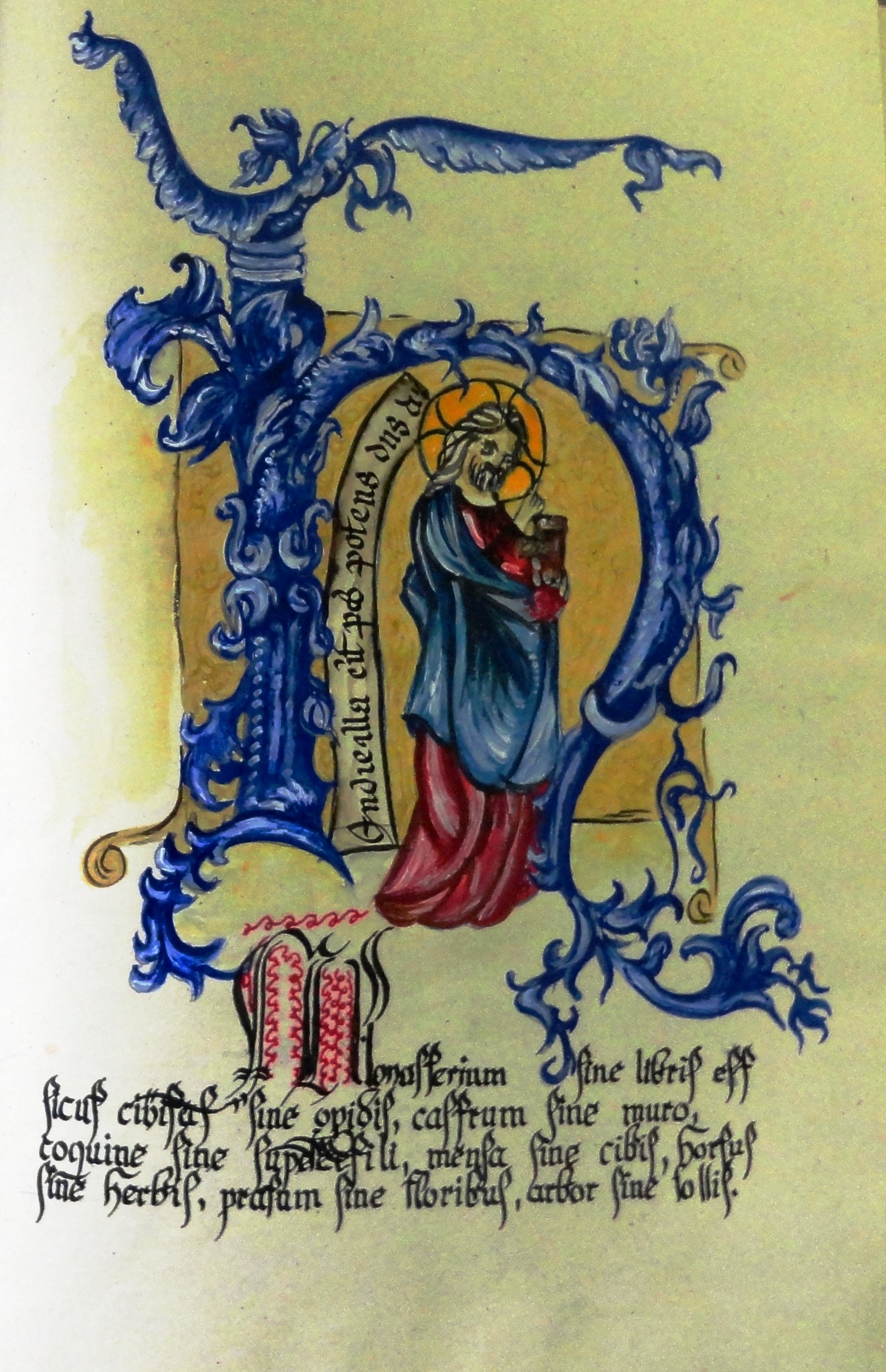

The Carthusian order never preached religion through the spoken word, but took to spreading it in writing, accepting into the order only people with a good knowledge of foreign languages (mostly German, Latin, and Greek) and exemplary writing skills. They devoted a large part of their lives to producing precise copies of existing texts as well as creating new ones on a wide range of topics, from theology to astronomy, from practical sciences to those more literary in nature. Among the texts still in existence are many notable works which are part of the intellectual heritage of this region and the wider Middle-European sphere.

Despite the loss of most of the manuscripts, the remnants of impressive library can still provide a valuable insight into several centuries of continuous development of the medieval book. Today about 120 manuscripts and 100 fragments are known. This is only a fraction of the whole, and even this small part is almost entirely outside Slovenian borders. Yet this is the only group of medieval manuscripts from Slovenia, making it possible to follow nearly four centuries of unbroken manuscript production within one monastic community. The manuscripts from the Žiče Charterhouse include many notable texts written by authors living in Žiče or the nearby Jurklošter Charterhouse. Examples include texts by Phillip of Žiče (Seitz), Nicolaus Kempf, and Sifried of Swabia.

Several of these manuscripts are also signed by monks or copyists from outside, who were probably benefactors, and their hand-written works makes of rich palette of paleographical forms. It is also the only group of manuscripts in Slovenia which is complete enough to follow the development of flourished (penwork) initials and consequently to speak about the "Žiče style". Some manuscripts also display colourful painted initials and other illuminated elements, created by professional and—as was common practice in those times—by itinerant painters.

=== Gastuž Inn ===
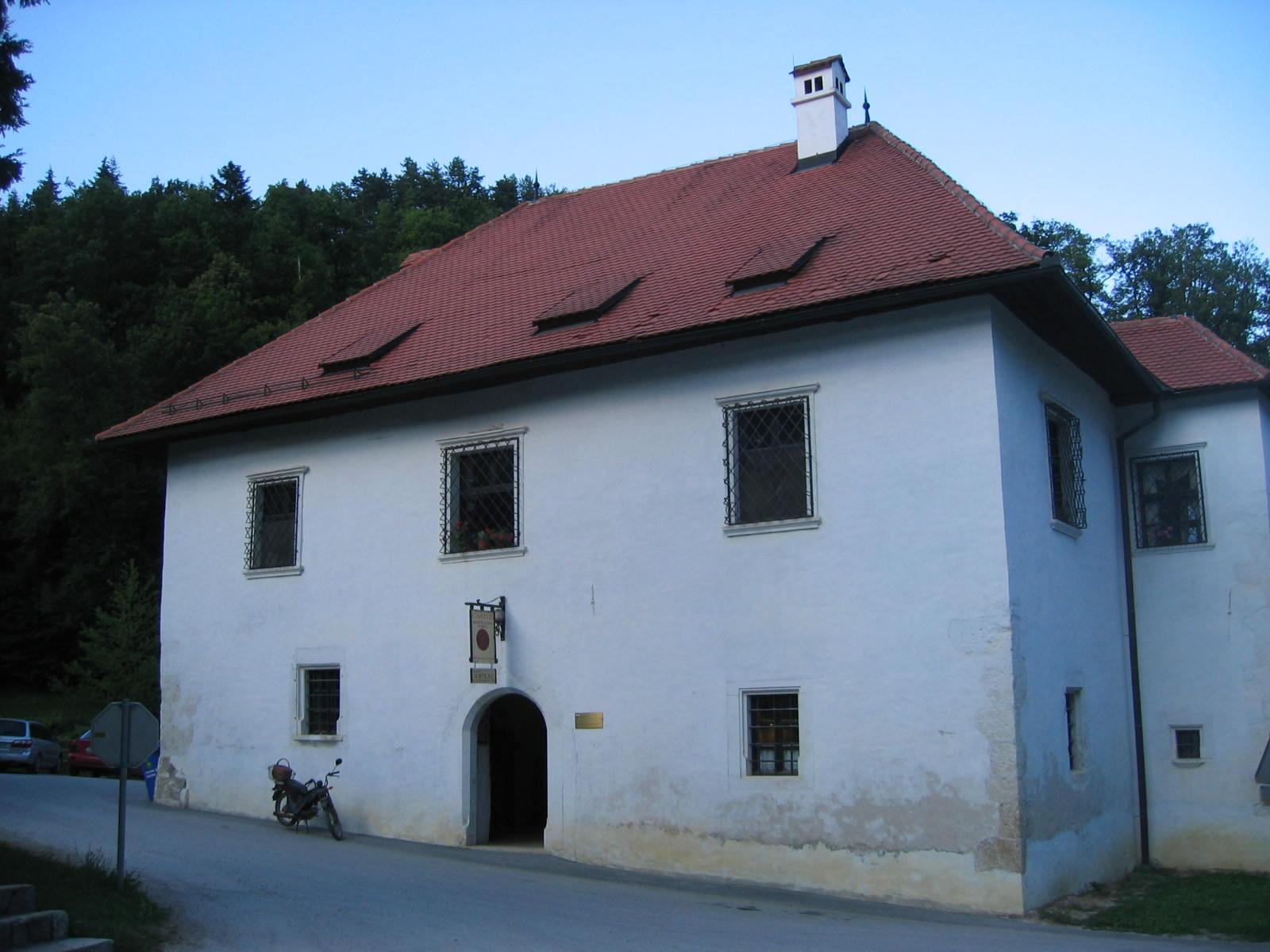
Gastuž Inn

Guests or visitors were always taken outside the charterhouse walls. After the dissolution of the monastery in Špitalič, guest were welcomed in the Gastuž Inn, purporting to be the oldest inn on Slovenian territory (dating to 1467).

== Present day ==
Today the Žiče Charterhouse is an important historical and cultural monument with about 20,000 visitors per year. Reconstruction work under expert supervision is still in progress. In accordance with modern processes nowadays Žiče Chaterhouse hosts many cultural events during summer, even wedding, trying to revitalise historical memory to the chartusians in this area.

On the occasion of 850th anniversary of Žiče Charterhouse foundation deed, Charterhouse was proclaimed a cultural monument of national importance on 24 June 2018, by the Government of Republic of Slovenia.

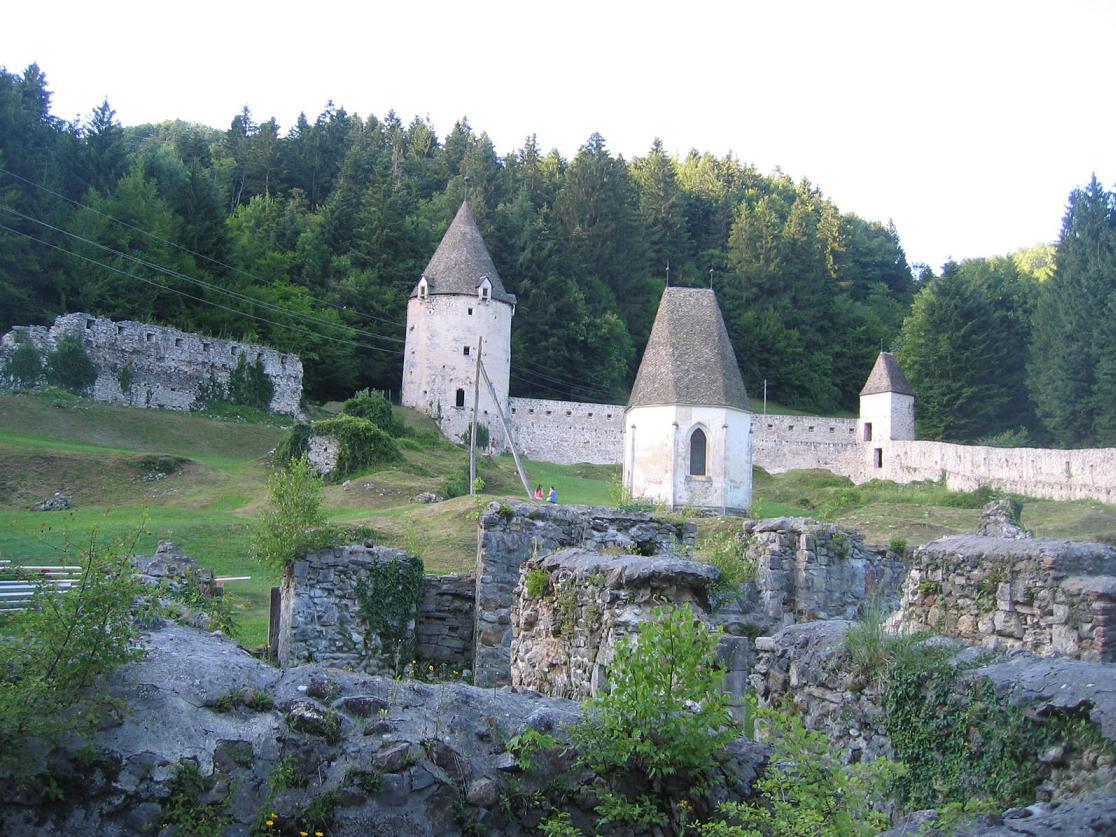
Ruins of former monastic cells and common building

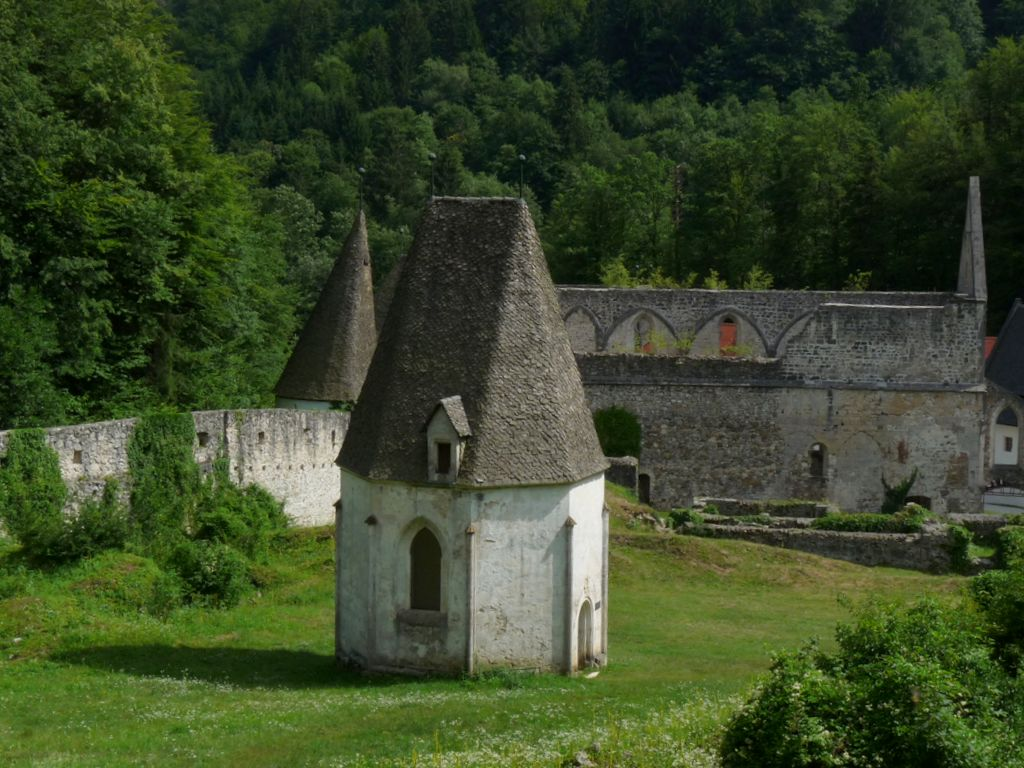
Former Great Cloister with All Saints cemetery chapel

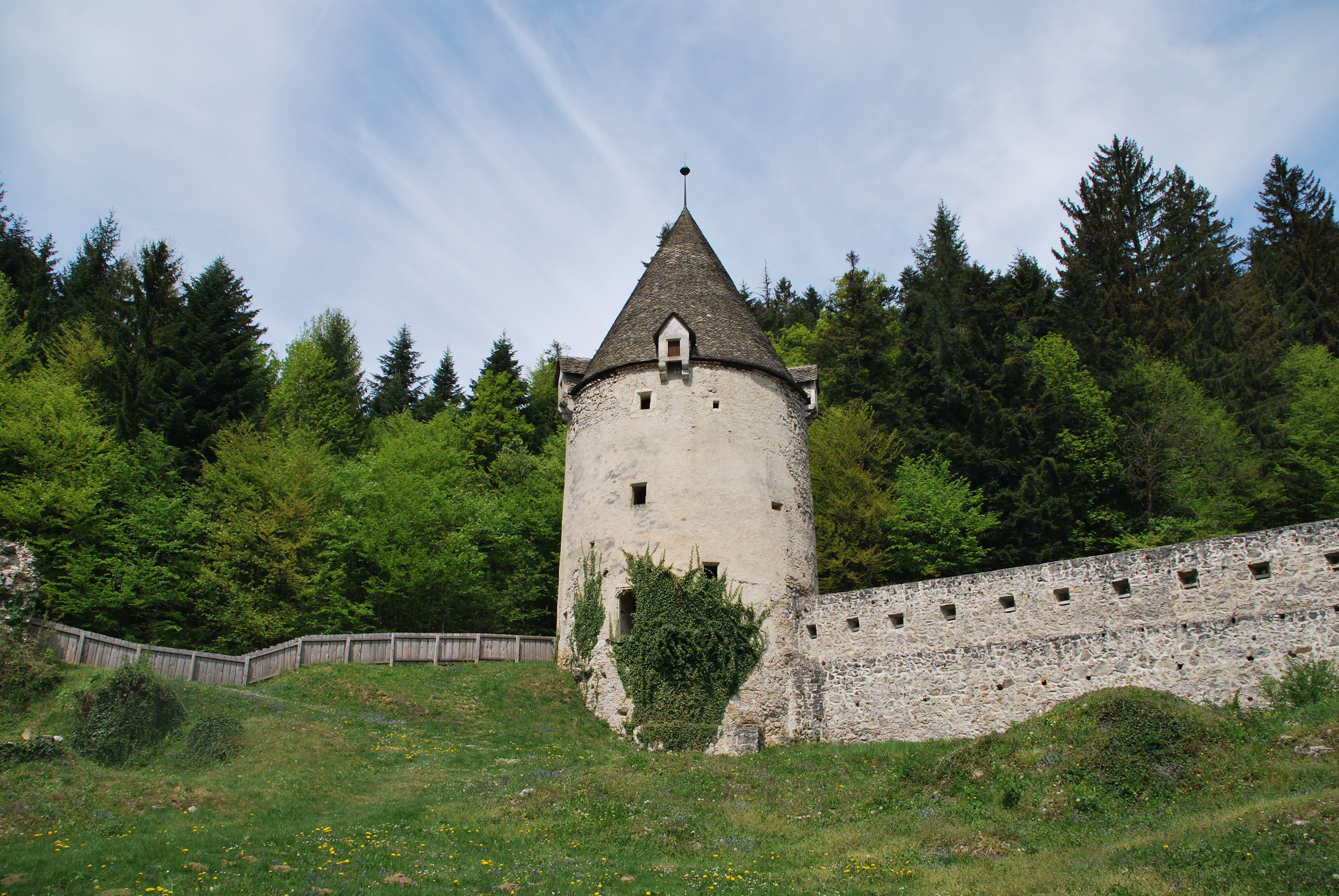
Defense walls with tower

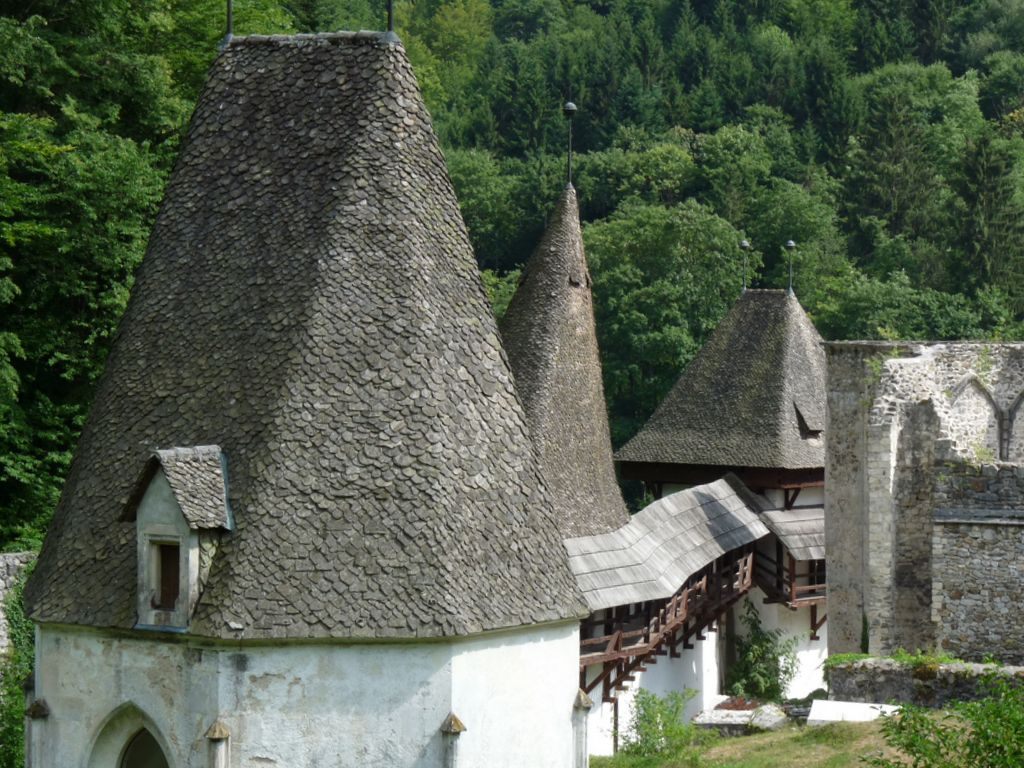
Cemetery chapel, detail

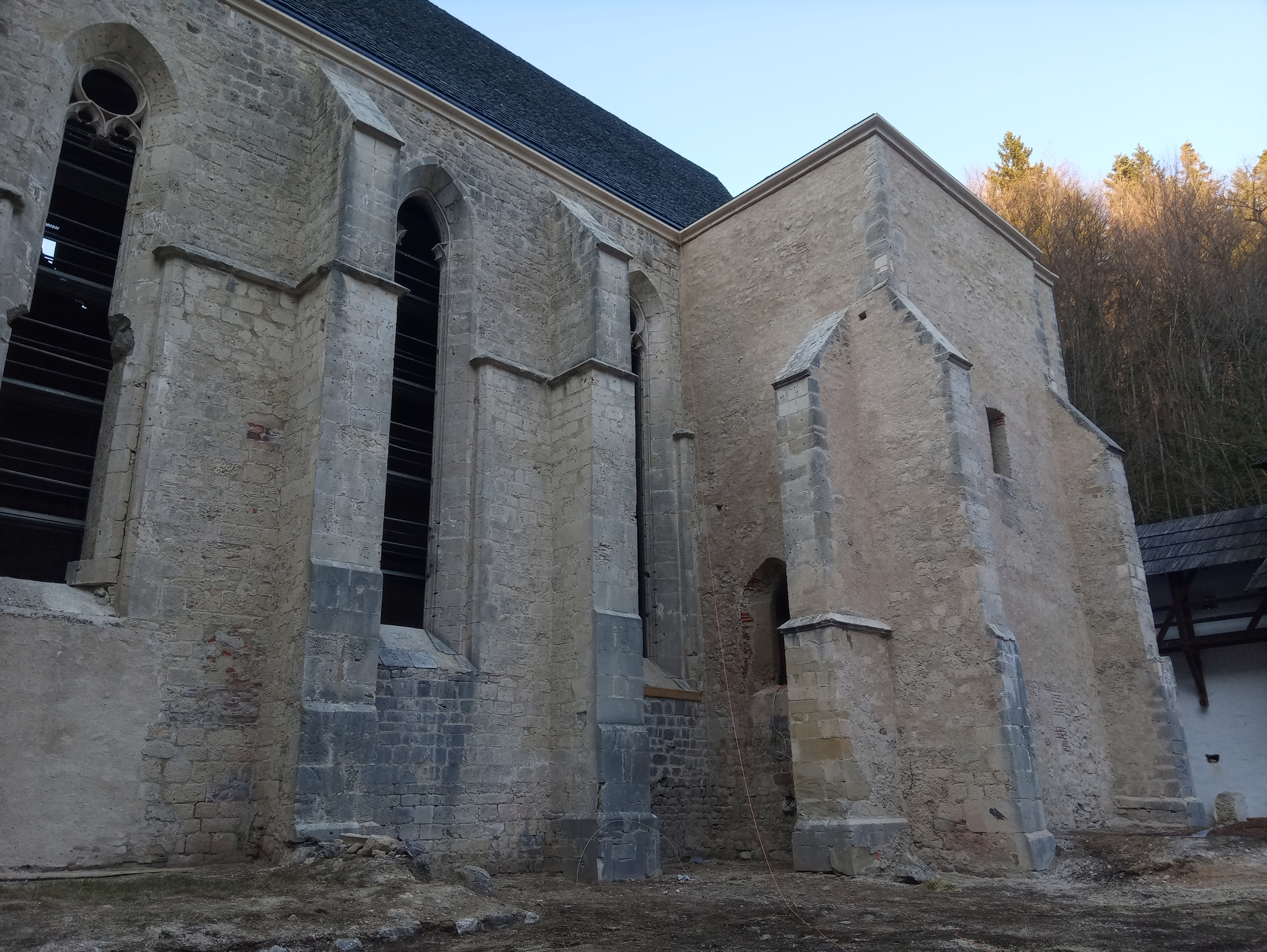
Monastic church of St. John the Baptist

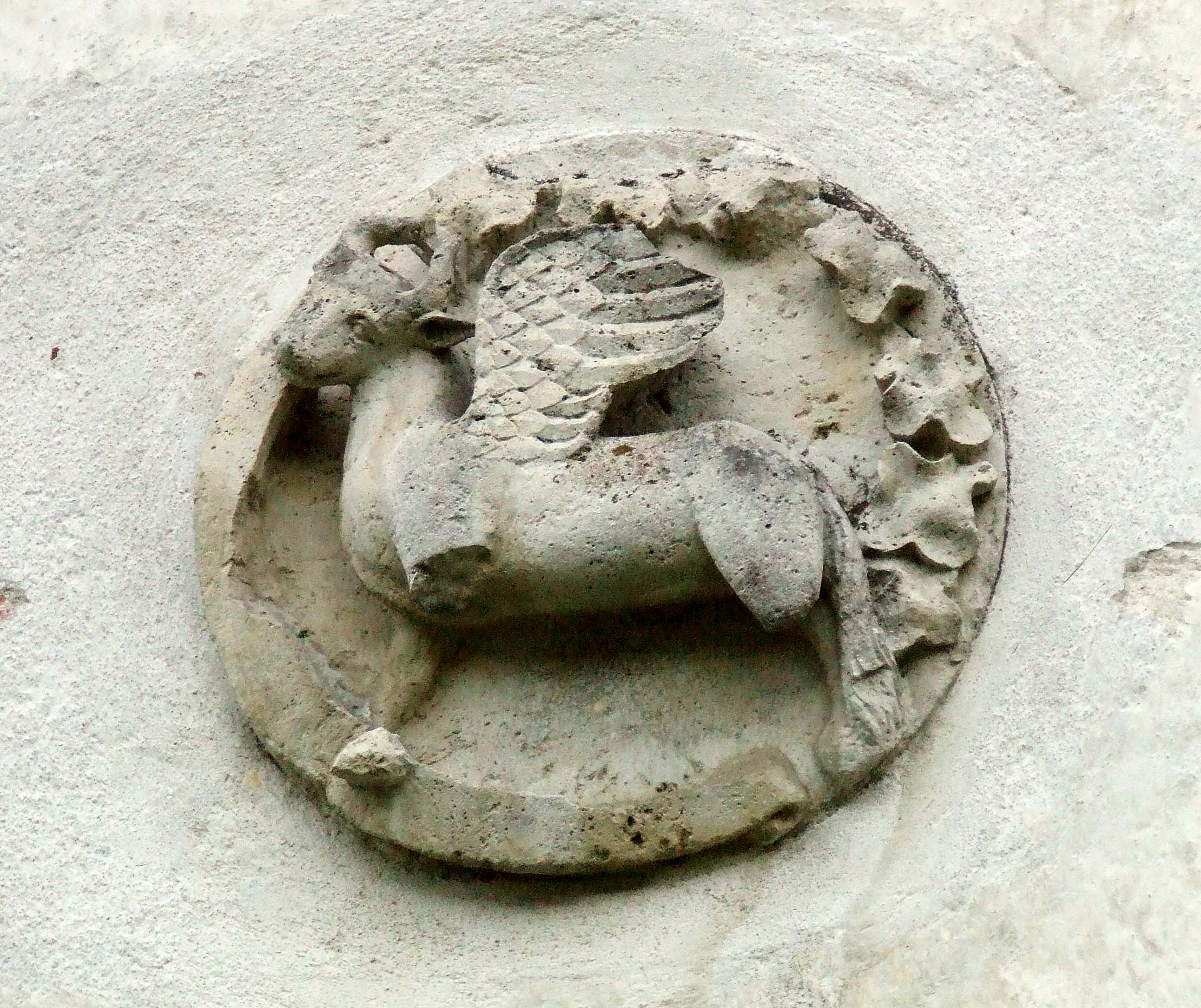
Winged ox relief

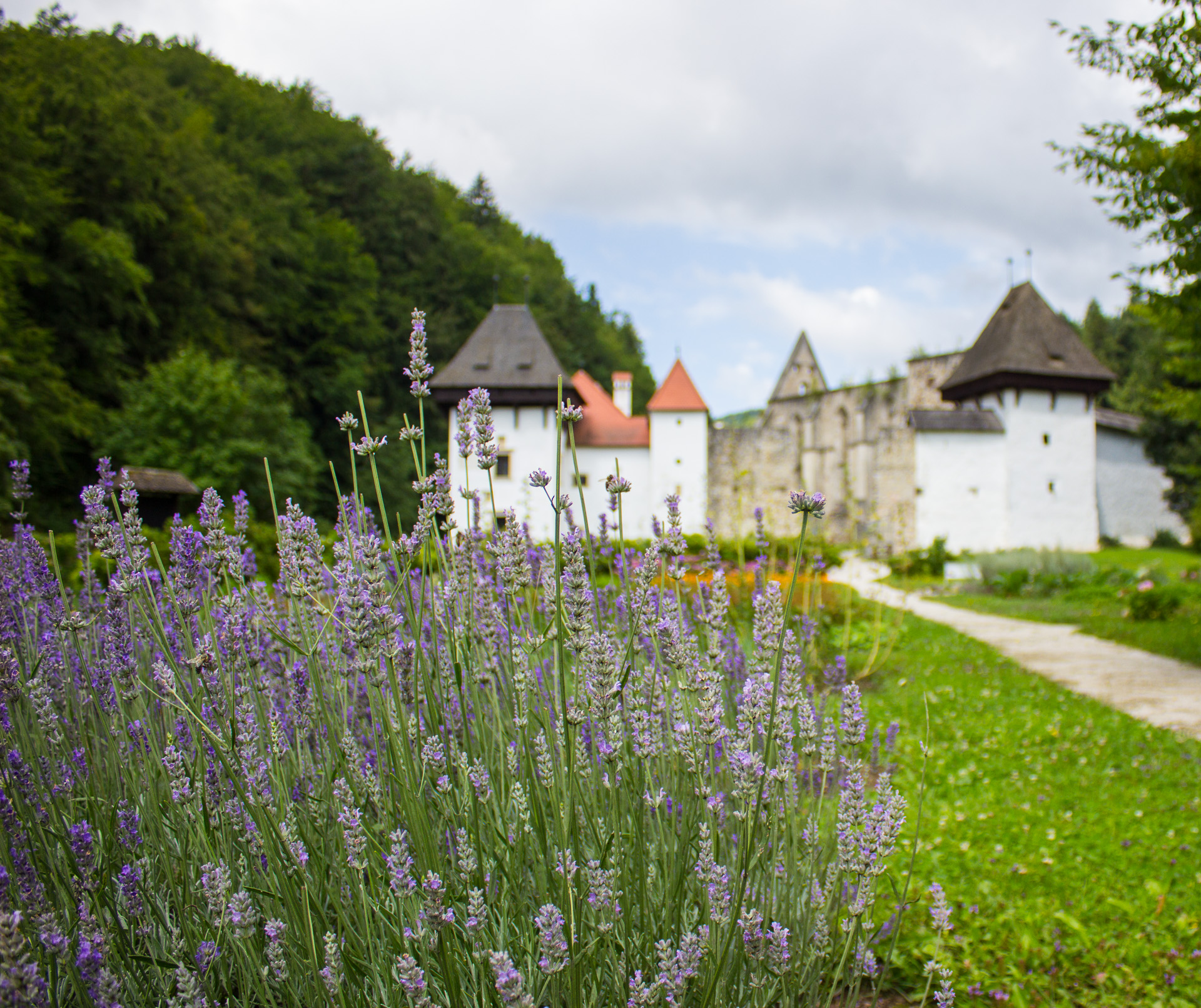
Žiče Charterhouse from monastic Herb Garden

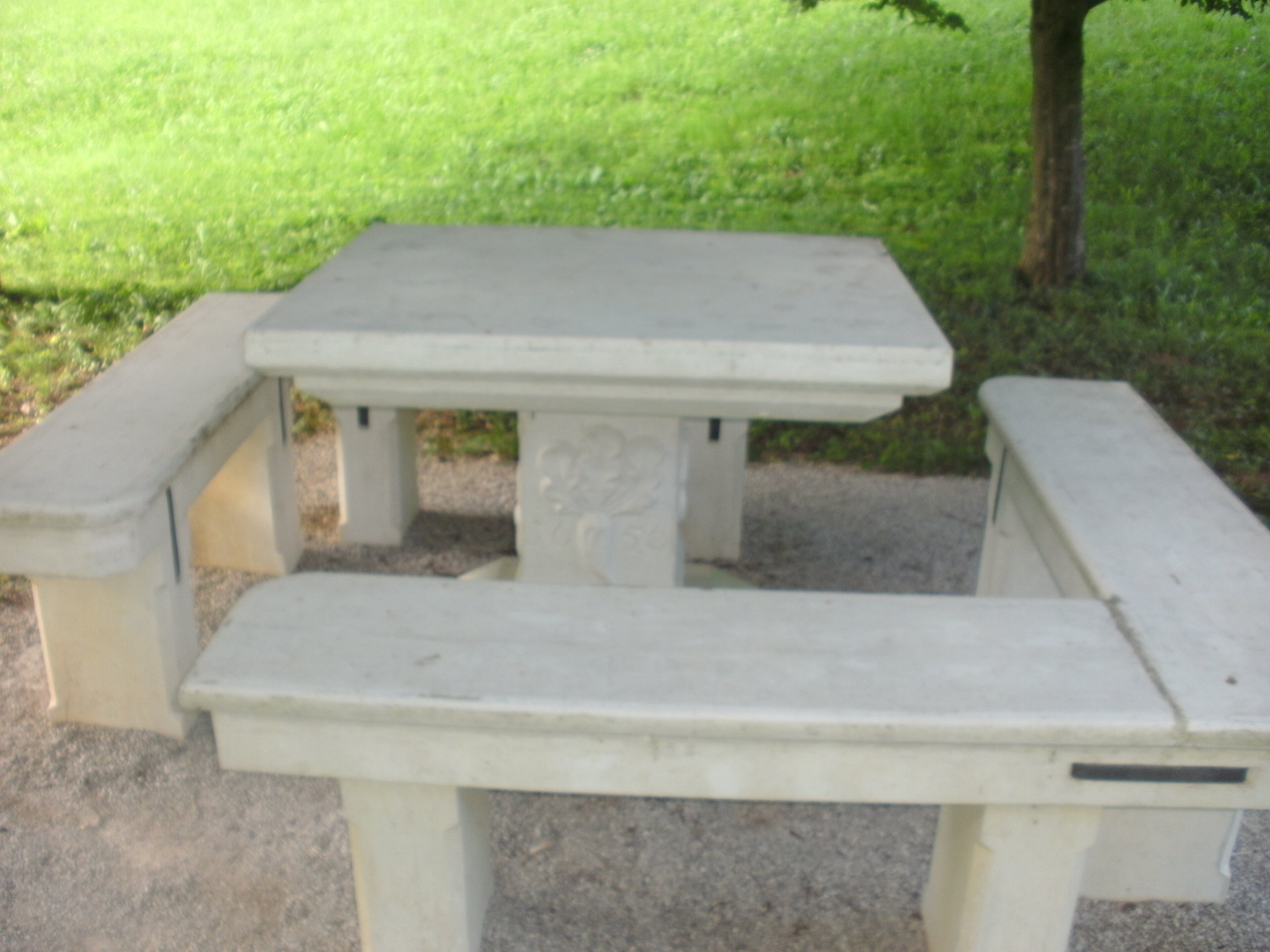
Monastic table from 1656, replicated

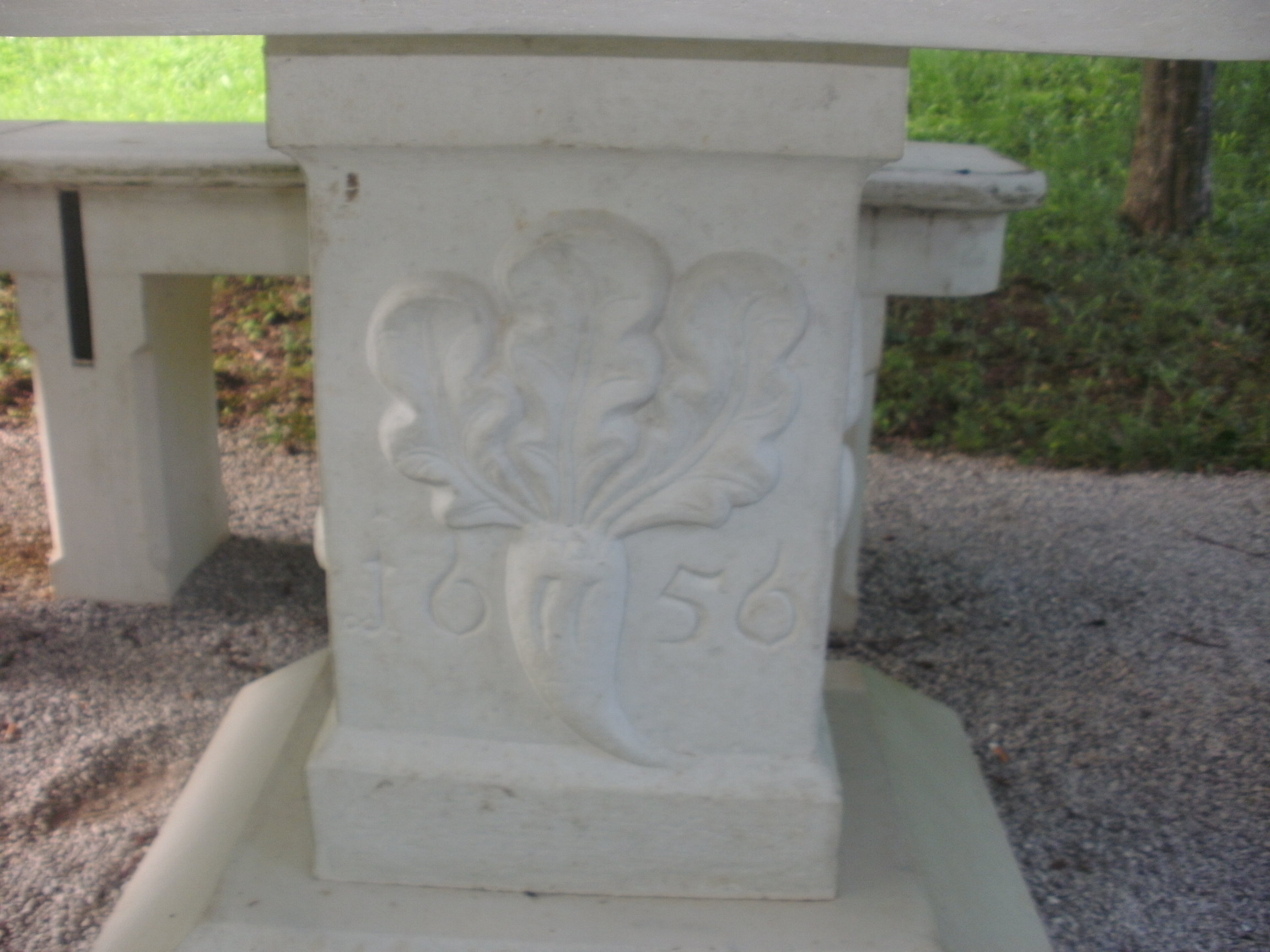
Monastic table from 1656, detail
