= St. George's Church (Ptuj) =

Parish church in Ptuj, northeastern Slovenia

Coordinates: 46°25′13.21″N 15°52′16″E

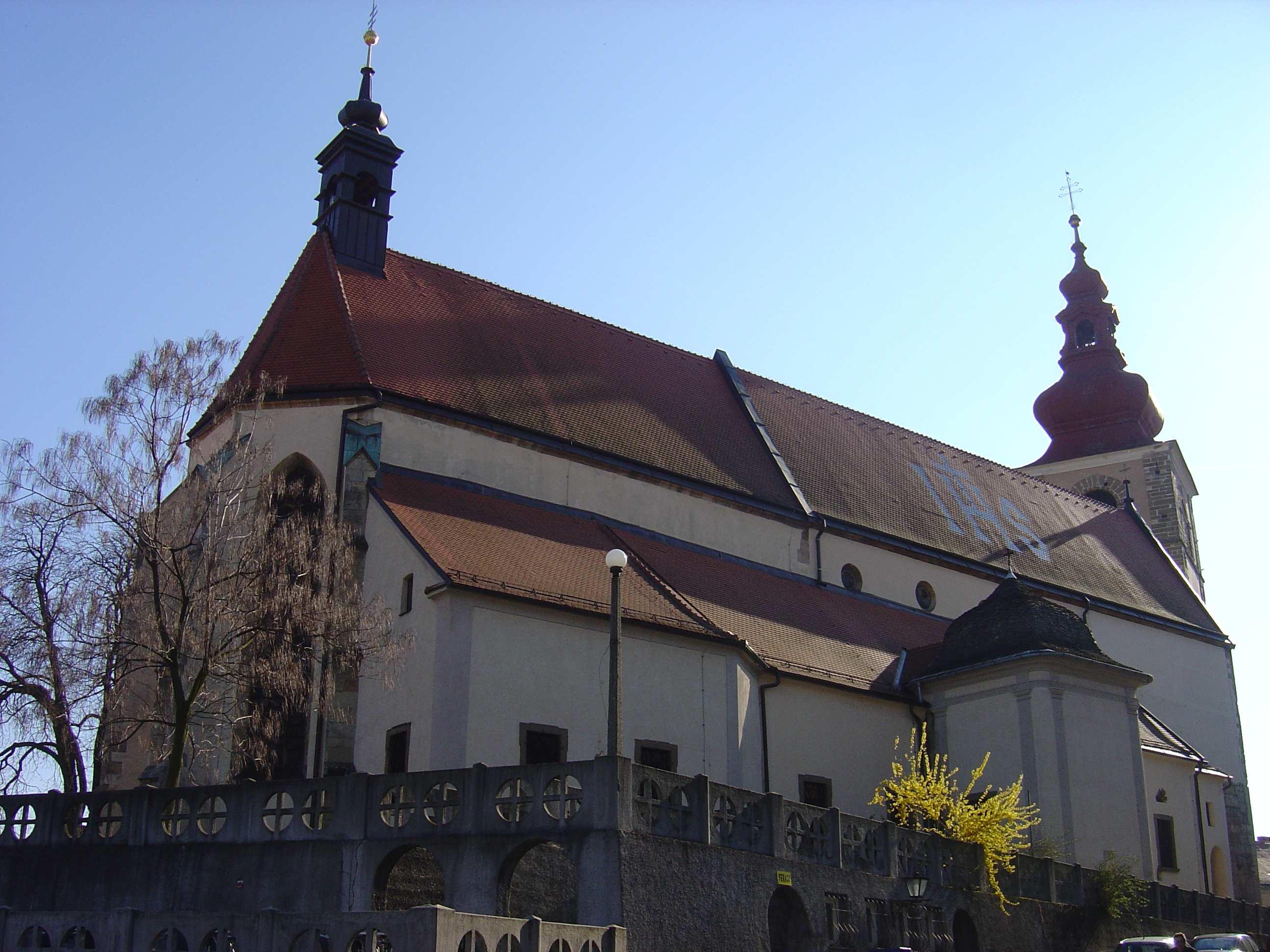
St. George's Church and the free-standing Town Tower behind it

St. George's Church (Slovene: cerkev sv. Jurija) is a parish church in Ptuj, northeastern Slovenia. It was built in the 12th century and in the 15th century redesigned in the Gothic style. Viewed from Slovene Square (Slovenski trg, the southwest), it is located behind the monolithic Roman tombstone, the Monument of Orpheus, and the free standing Town Tower. There are Renaissance and Baroque gravestones on the exterior walls of the church. The paintings in the interior were made from the late 13th to the end of the 15th century. In 1863 the church became Provost.
