= Ptuj =

- Town
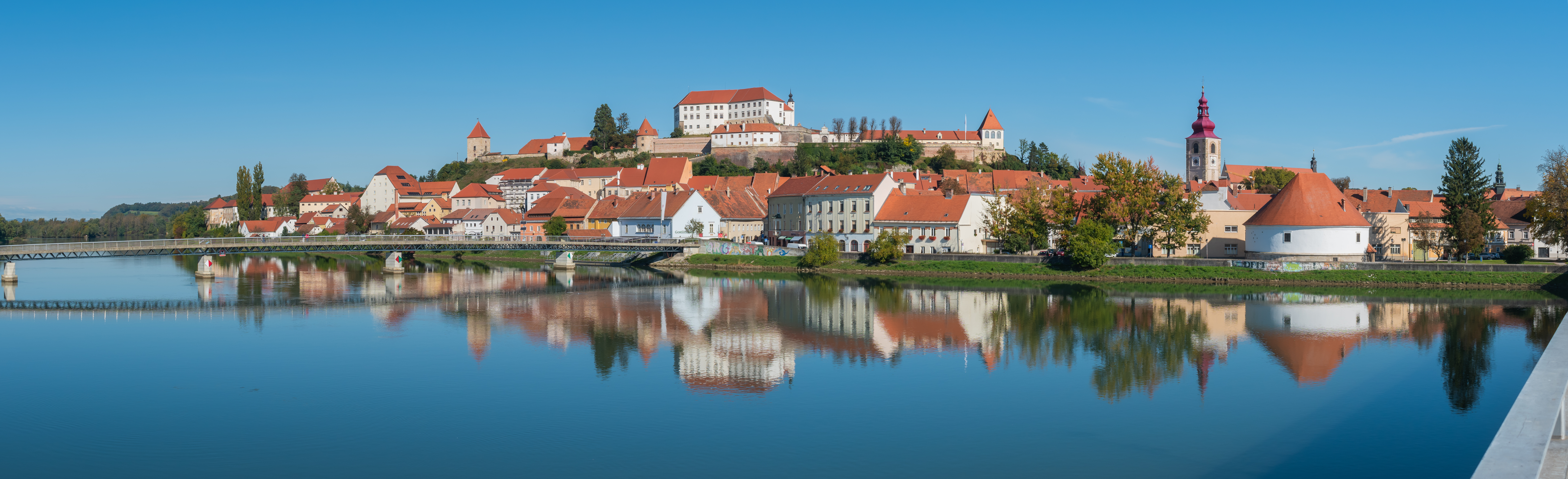
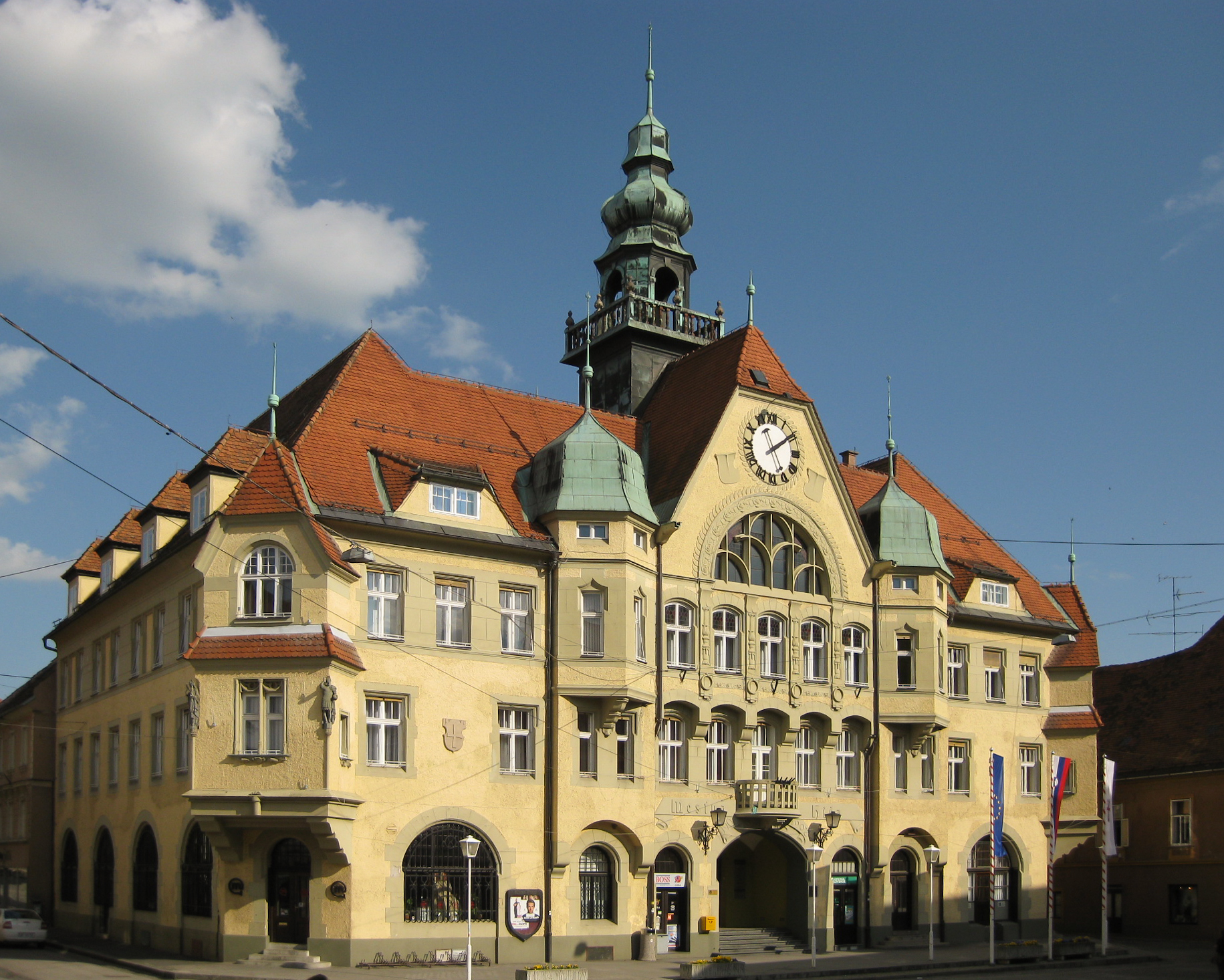
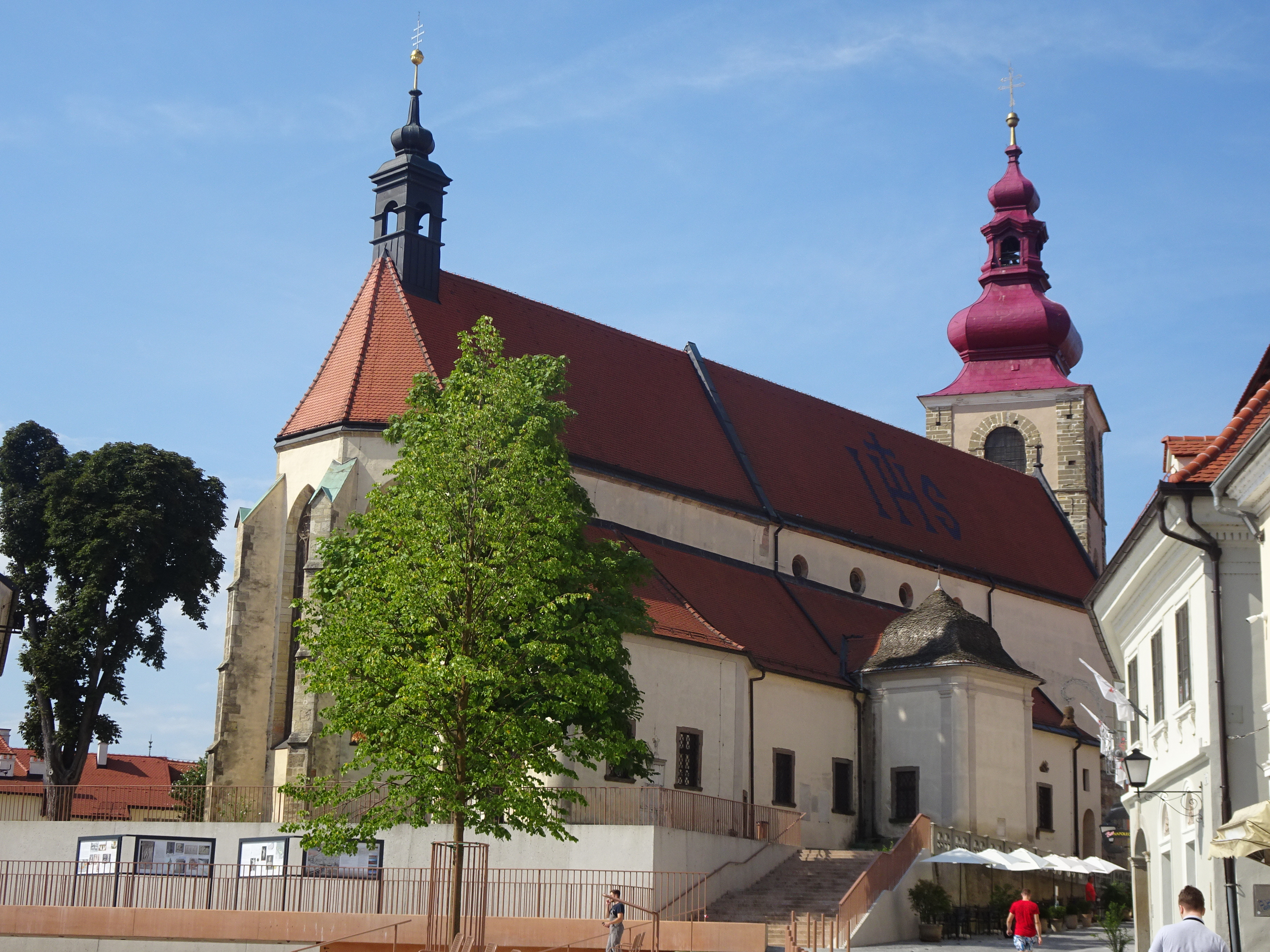
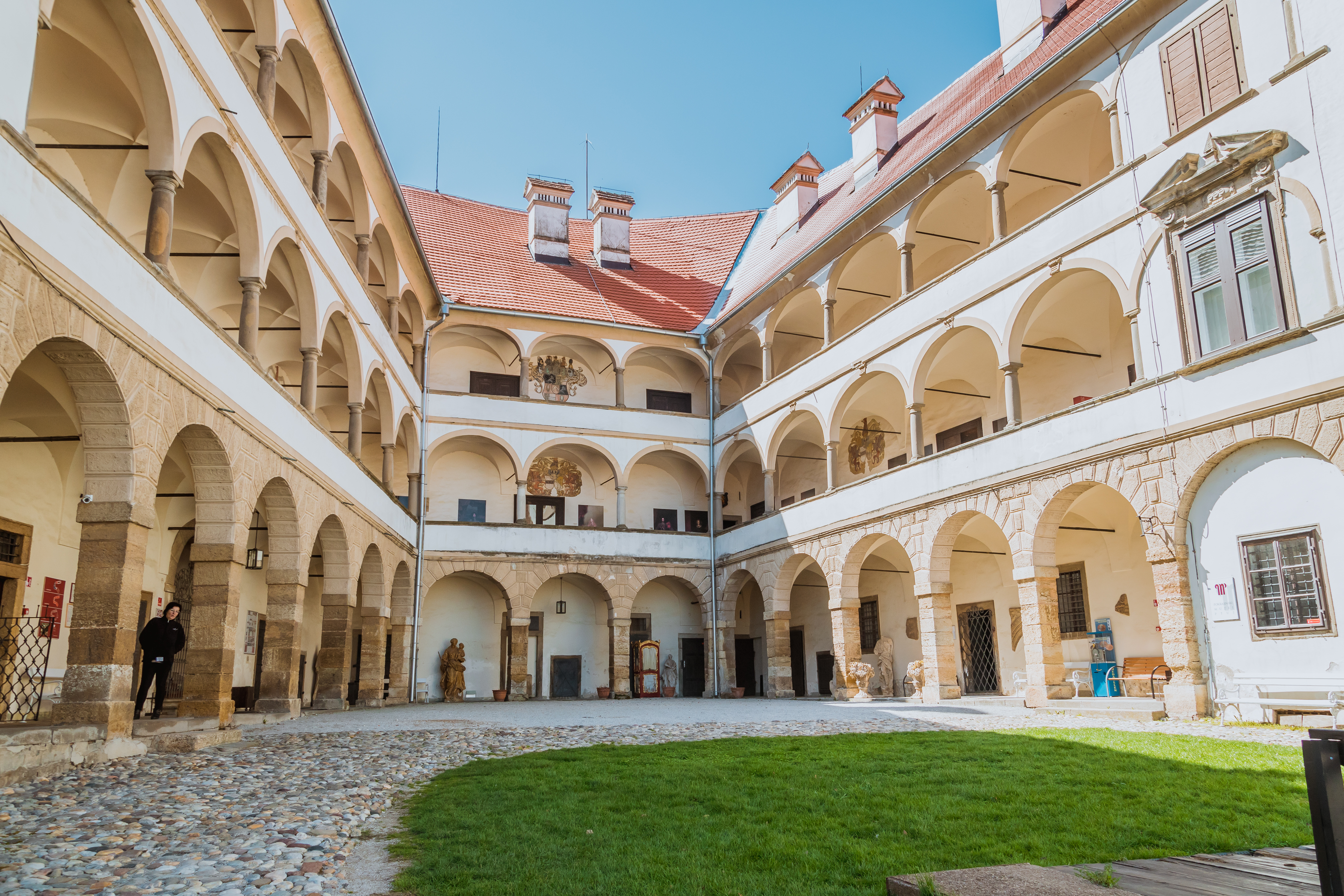
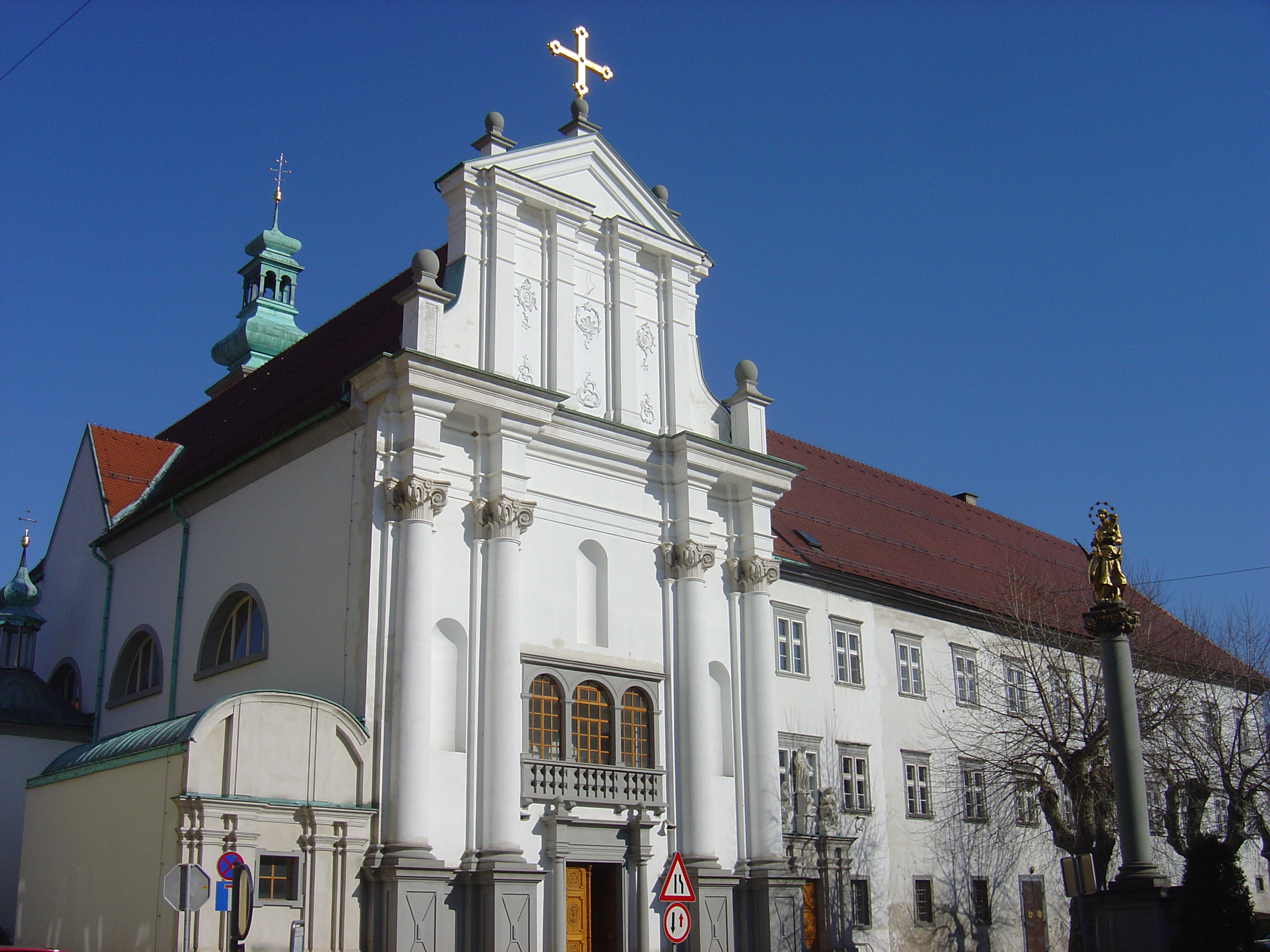
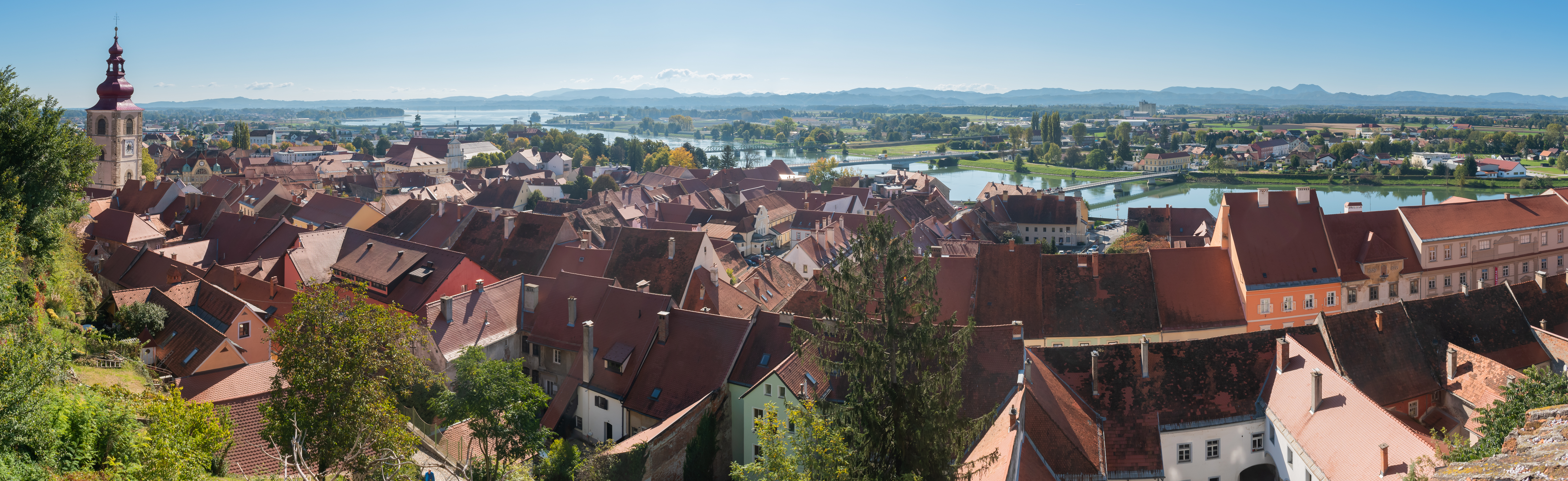
- View of old town over the Drava River Town Hall St. George's Church Castle Courtyard Minorite Monastery View from Ptuj Castle

- Flag Coat of arms
- Interactive map of Ptuj
- Location of the city of Ptuj in Slovenia
- Coordinates: 46°25′10″N 15°52′10″E
- Country: Slovenia
- Traditional region: Styria
- Statistical region: Drava
- Municipality: Ptuj
- First mention: AD 69
- Town privileges: 1376
- Founder: Vespasian

Government
  - Mayor: Nuška Gajšek (SD)

Area
  - Total: 25.6 km^{2} (9.9 sq mi)
- Elevation: 232 m (761 ft)

Population (2023)
  - Total: 17,984
  - Density: 702/km^{2} (1,820/sq mi)
- Time zone: UTC+01 (CET)
  - Summer (DST): UTC+02 (CEST)
- Postal code: 2250
- Vehicle registration: MB
- Website: www.ptuj.si

Ptuj (Slovene: [ˈptùːj]; German: Pettau, pronounced [ˈpɛtaʊ̯]; Latin: Poetovium/Poetovio) is the eighth-largest town of Slovenia, located in the traditional region of Styria (northeastern Slovenia). It is the seat of the Municipality of Ptuj. Being the oldest recorded city in Slovenia, it has been inhabited since the late Stone Age and developed from a Roman military fort, located at a strategically important crossing of the Drava River along a prehistoric trade route between the Baltic Sea and the Adriatic.

== History ==
Historical affiliations

Roman Empire (69–476AD)
Ostrogothic Kingdom (476–552)
Lombards (552–568)
Pannonian Avars (568–623, 658–700)
Samo's Empire (623–658)
Early Slavs (700–795)
Francia (795–840)
Balaton Principality (840–874)
Archbishop of Salzburg (977–1555)
Habsburg Monarchy (1555–1804)
Austrian Empire (1804–1867)
Austria-Hungary (1867–1918)
State of Slovenes, Croats and Serbs (1918)
Kingdom of Yugoslavia (1918–1941)
Nazi Germany (1941–1944)
SFR Yugoslavia (1944–1991)
Slovenia 1991–Present

=== Early history ===
Ptuj is the oldest recorded town in Slovenia. There is evidence that the area was settled in the Stone Age. In the Late Iron Age it was settled by Celts.

=== First mentions ===
By the 1st century BC, the settlement was controlled by Ancient Rome as part of the Pannonian province. In 69 AD, Vespasian was elected Roman Emperor by the Danubian legions in Ptuj, and the first written mention of the city of Ptuj is from the same year. Poetovium was the base-camp of Legio XIII Gemina where it had its legionary fortress or castrum. The name originated in the times of Emperor Trajan, who granted the settlement city status and named it Colonia Ulpia Traiana Poetovio in 103. The patristic writer Victorinus was Bishop of Poetovio before his martyrdom in 303 or 304. The Caesar Constantius Gallus was divested of his imperial robe and arrested in Poetovio before his subsequent execution in Pola (354) (Amm.Marc. Hist. XIV) The battle of Poetovio in 388 saw Theodosius I's victory over the usurper, Maximus.

The city had 40,000 inhabitants until it was plundered by the Huns in 450.

=== Middle Ages ===
In 570 the city was occupied by Eurasian Avars and Slavic tribes. Ptuj became part of the Frankish Empire after the fall of the Avar state at the end of 8th century. Between 840 and 874 it belonged to the Slavic Balaton Principality of Pribina and Kocelj. Between 874 and 890 Ptuj gradually came under the influence of the Archbishopric of Salzburg which had both spiritual and temporal rule over the town; city rights passed in 1376 began an economic upswing for the settlement.

=== Habsburg Monarchy and Austria-Hungary ===
After the re-establishment of the Habsburg rule in 1490, following Matthias Corvinus's conquests, the Archbishop of Salzburg was stripped of the remaining temporal authority over the town and the surrounding areas; Ptuj (known in German as Pettau) was officially incorporated into the Duchy of Styria in 1555.

Pettau was a battleground during the Ottoman wars in Europe and suffered from fires in 1684, 1705, 1710, and 1744. Its population and importance began to decline in the 19th century, however, after the completion of the Vienna-Trieste route of the Austrian Southern Railway, as the line went through Marburg (Maribor) instead.

According to the 1910 Austro-Hungarian census, 86% of the population of Pettau's Old Town was German-speaking, while the population of the surrounding villages predominantly spoke Slovenian. After the collapse of Austria-Hungary at the end of World War I, Pettau was included in the short-lived Republic of German Austria.

=== Establishment of Yugoslavia ===
After the military intervention of the Slovenian general Rudolf Maister, the entire territory of Lower Styria was included into the State of Slovenes, Croats and Serbs (Yugoslavia). During the interwar period, the number and the percentage of those identifying as Germans in the city, which was renamed Ptuj, decreased rapidly, although a relatively strong ethnic German minority remained.

=== World War II ===
After the invasion of Yugoslavia in April 1941, Ptuj was occupied by Nazi Germany. From 1941 to 1944 the town's Slovenian population was dispossessed and deported. Their homes were taken over by German speakers from South Tyrol and Gottschee County, who had themselves been evicted according to an agreement between Adolf Hitler and Benito Mussolini. These German immigrants, along with the native German Pettauer, were expelled to Austria in 1945; many later settled in North America.

Since 1945, Ptuj has been populated almost completely by Slovenes.

== Culture ==
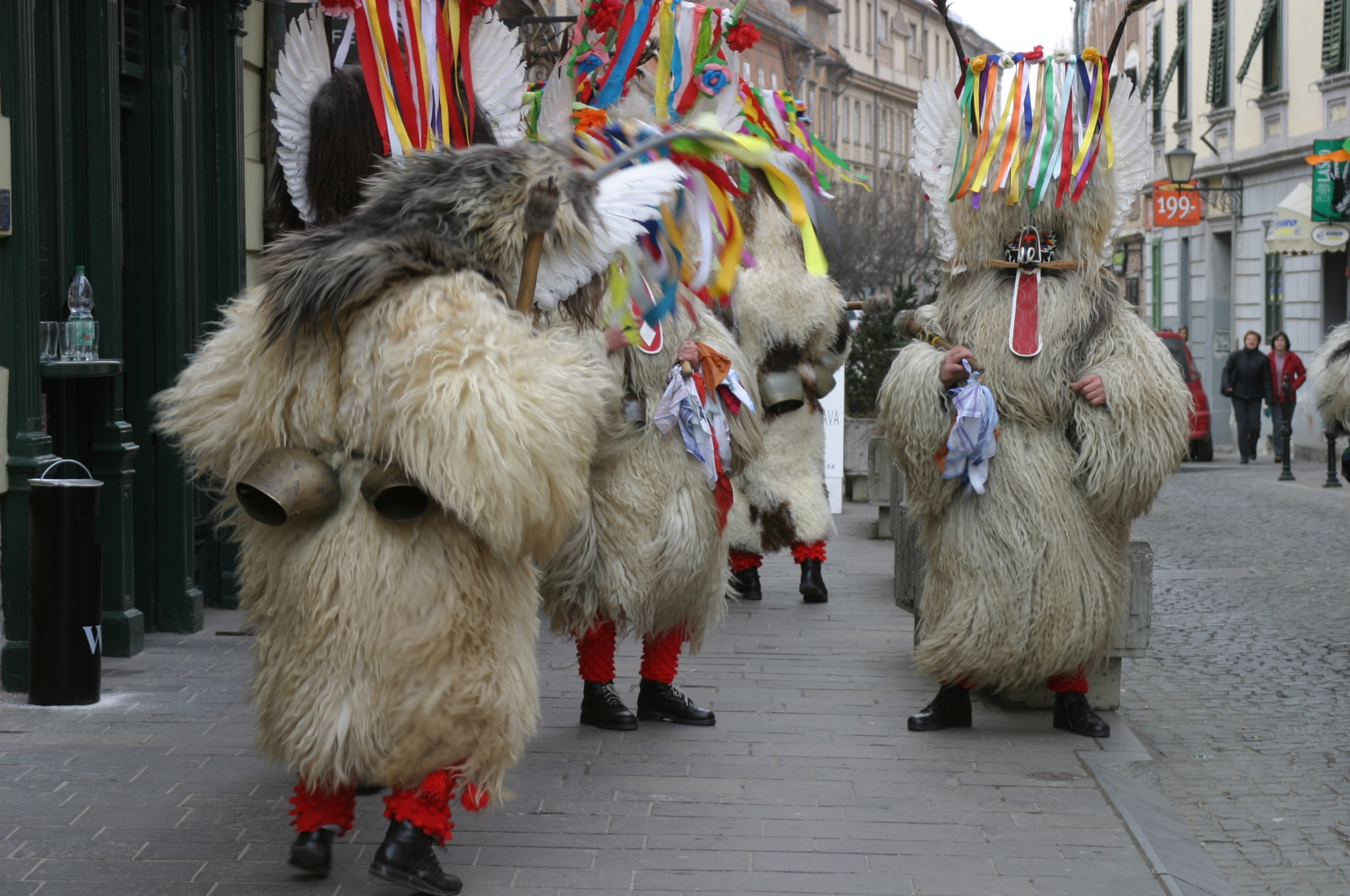
Kurenti in Ptuj

=== The Kurent or Korant Carnival ===
Ptuj is the center place of a ten-day-long carnival in the spring, an ancient Slavic pagan rite of spring and fertility, called Kurentovanje or Korantovanje. Kurent is believed to be the name of an ancient god of hedonism - the Slavic counterpart of the Greek god Priapos, although there are no written records.

Kurent or Korant is a figure dressed in sheep skin who goes about the town wearing a mask, a long red tongue, cowbells, and multi-colored ribbons on its head. The Kurent(s) from Ptuj and the adjoining villages also wear feathers, while those from the Haloze and Lancova Vas wear horns. Organized in groups, Kurents go through town, from house to house, making noise with their bells and wooden sticks, to symbolically scare off evil spirits and the winter.

== Landmarks ==
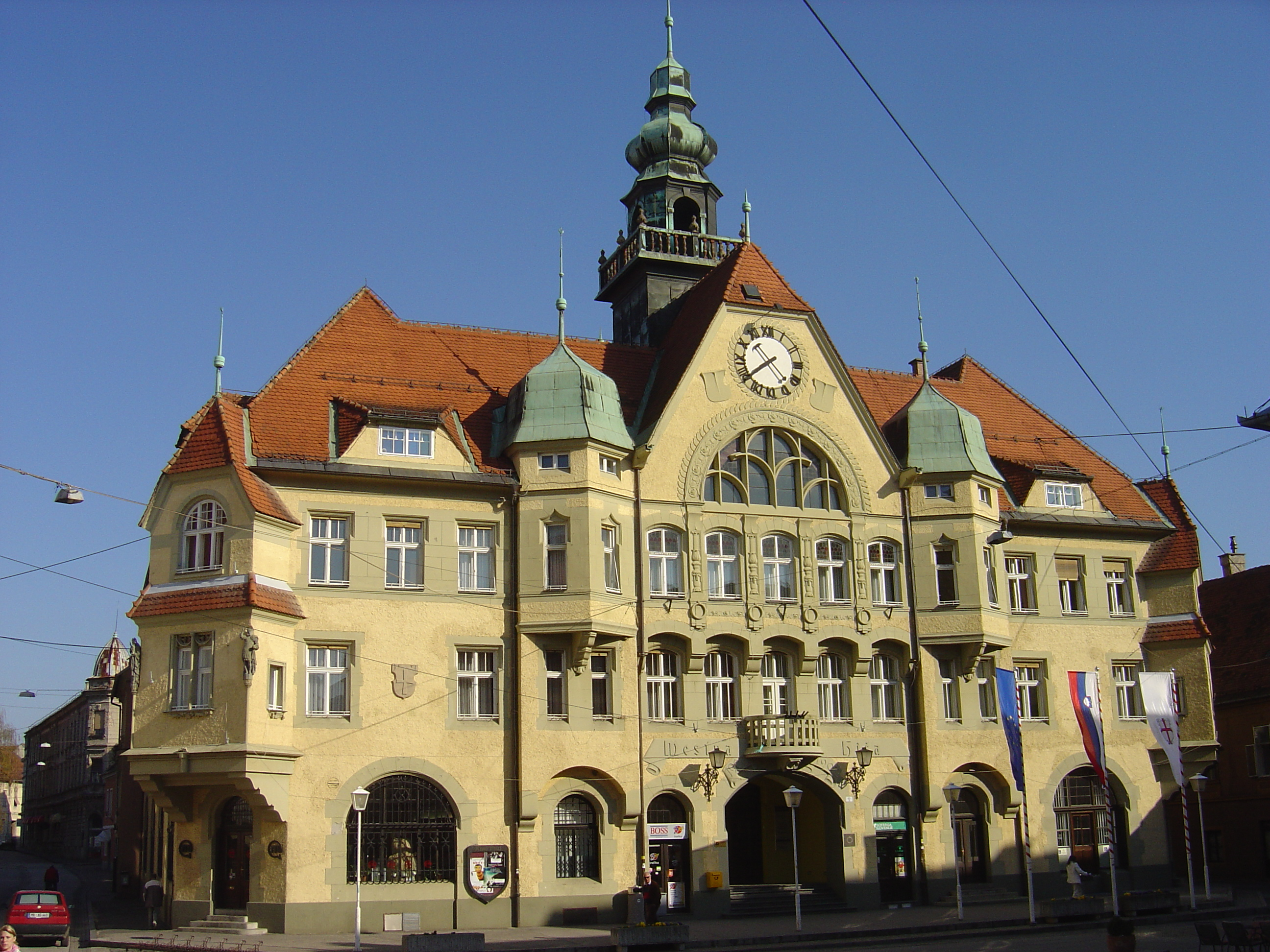
Ptuj Town Hall

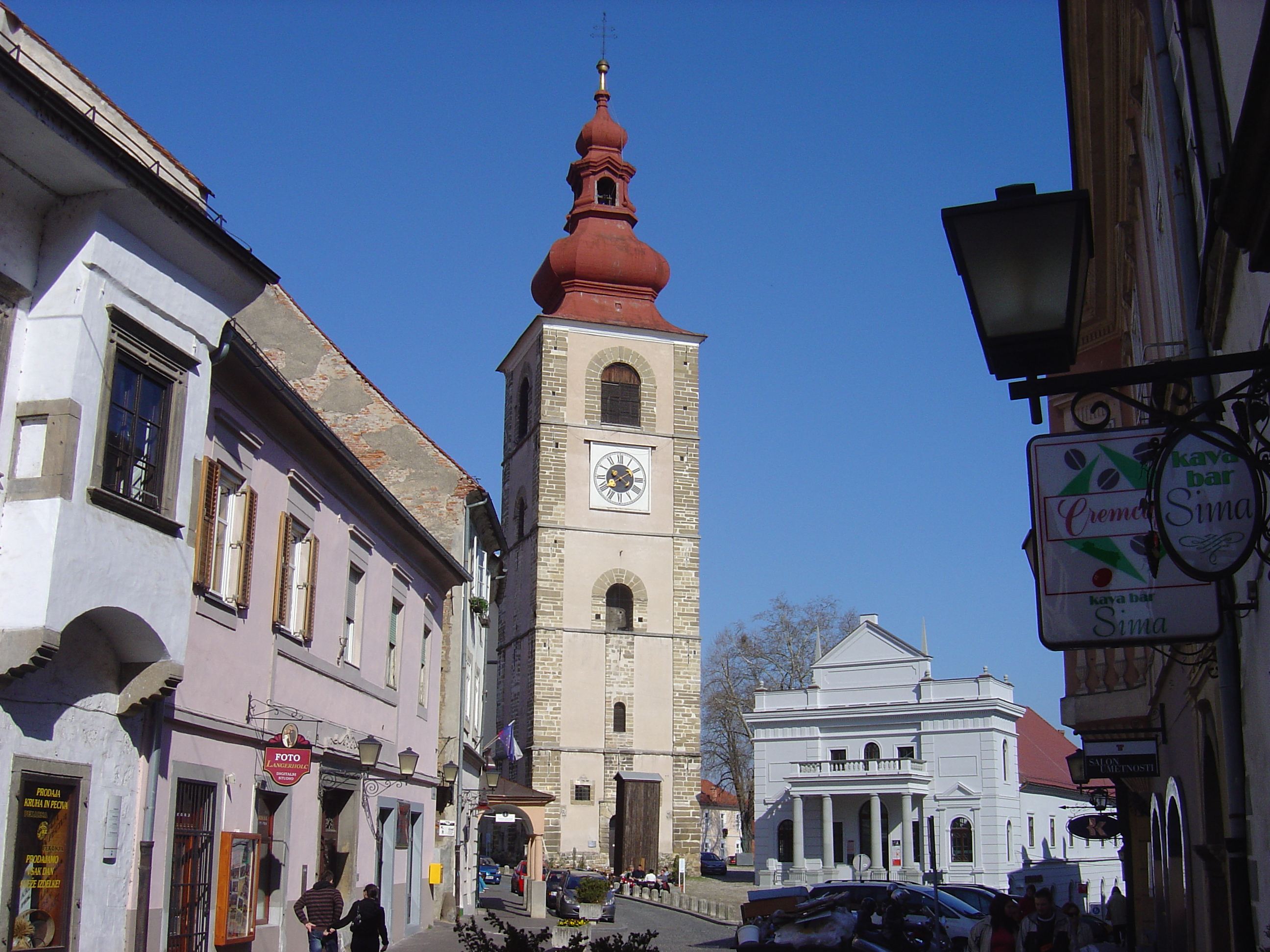
Town Tower and Theatre

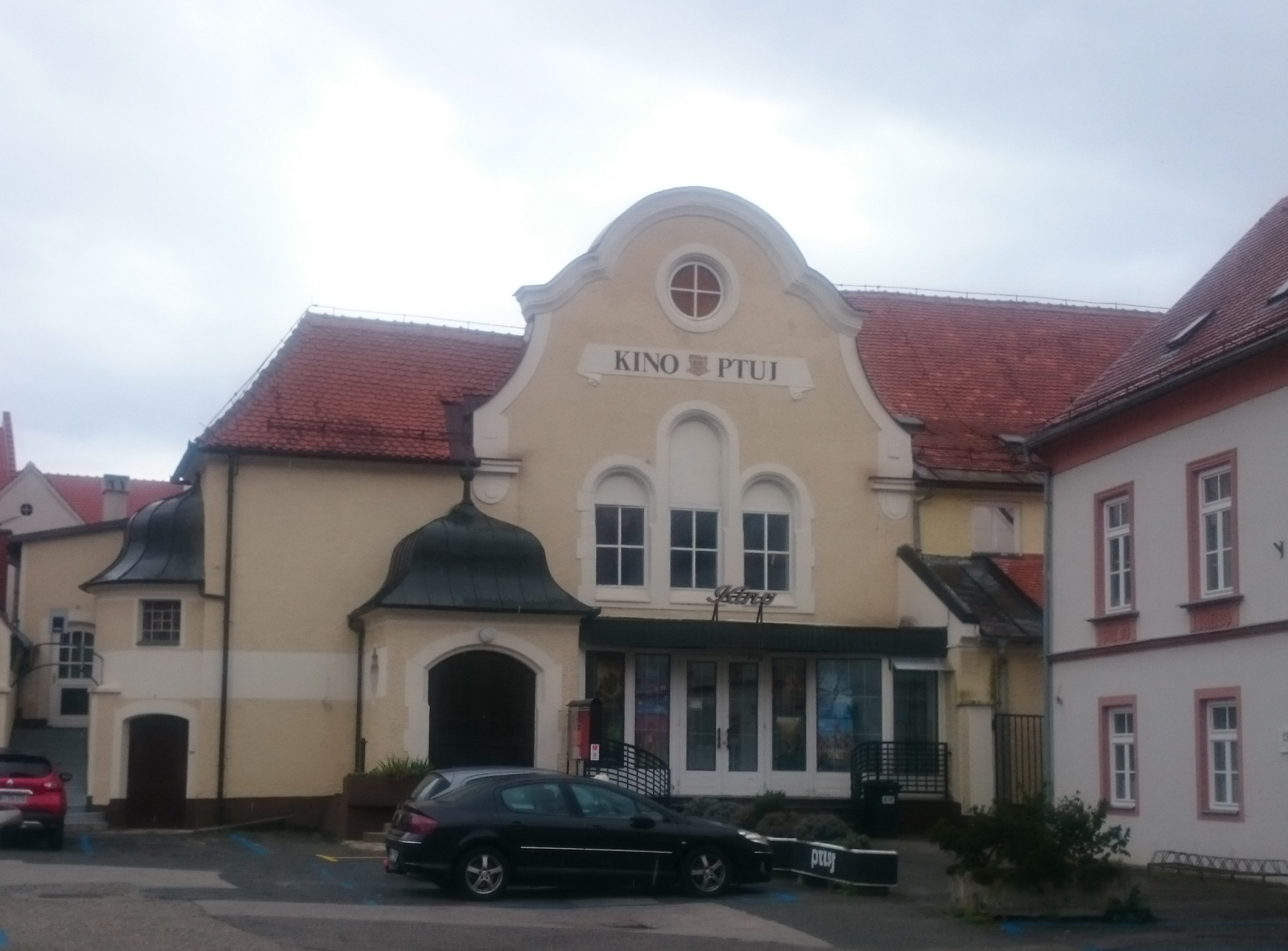
Ptuj City Cinema (opened on 3 March 1897) is the oldest still active commercial movie theater in the world.

The parish church in the settlement is dedicated to Saint George and belongs to the Roman Catholic Archdiocese of Maribor. It is a three-naved Gothic building from the 13th and early 14th century, but the structure incorporates parts of a much earlier structure, dating to the mid-9th century.

- Ptuj Castle
- St. George's Church
- Little Castle
- Ptuj Town Hall
- Ptuj Town Theatre
- Town Tower
- Dominican monastery
- Orpheus Monument
- Franciscan monastery
- Upper Mansion
- St. Oswald's Church

== Town quarters ==
- Center
- Breg–Turnišče
- Ljudski Vrt
- Jezero
- Panorama
- Rogoznica
- Grajena
- Spuhlja

== Notable people ==
- Brigita Brezovac (born 1979), bodybuilder
- Nastja Čeh (born 1978), Slovenian international footballer
- Laris Gaiser (born 1977), geopolitical analyst and expert of international relations
- Tim Gajser (born 1996), motocross racer
- Luigi Kasimir (1881−1962), artist
- Emilija Mlakar Branc (1901–1989), mathematician and author of mathematics textbooks
- Benka Pulko (born 1967), long-distance motorcycle traveler, writer, photographer, humanitarian and Guinness World Record holder
- Miha Remec (1920−2020), science fiction author
- Angela Salloker (1913−2006), actress
- Aljaž Skorjanec (born 1990), dancer and choreographer
- Viktor Skrabar (1877–1938), lawyer and archaeologist
- Aleš Šteger (born 1973), poet
- Victorinus of Pettau (died 303), bishop and martyr
- Dejan Zavec (born 1976), boxer

== International relations ==
=== Twin towns and sister cities ===
Ptuj is twinned with:

- Aranđelovac, Serbia
- Banská Štiavnica, Slovakia (2002)
- Burghausen, Germany (2001)
- Ohrid, North Macedonia (2006)
- Saint-Cyr-sur-Loire, France (1998)
- Varaždin, Croatia (2004)

== Festivals and other events ==
=== Traditional ancient fairs ===
| Since | Event | Held on |
|---|---|---|
| 1300 | Ožbalt Fair | 5th August |
| 1458 | Jurij Fair | 23rd April |
| 1551 | Katarina Fair | 25 November |

=== Main annual events ===
| Since | Event | Note | Month |
|---|---|---|---|
| 1960 | Kurentovanje | the biggest carnival in Slovenia and central Europe | February or March |
| 1969 | Slovenian Folks Music Festival | the biggest and oldest Folks music event in Slovenia | September (early) |
| 1987 | Ptuj Summer Night | 2–days musical entertainment event at municipality celebration (on first Saturday in August and on Friday before that) | August (1st weekend) |
| 1990 | Delicacies of Slovenian Farms | 3–day event at Minorite Monastery Ptuj | May (4th weekend) |
| 1999 | Carnival Prince Inauguration | On St. Martin's Day, exactly at 11:11 AM (every 2 years) | November (11th) |
| 2003 | Ptuj Castle Games | organised by Imperial-Royals Ptuj, at Castle Tournament ground | September (early) |
| 2003 | Art Stays | International festival of contemporary fine arts | July–September |
| 2008 | Arsana Festival | Various number of pop, classic and alternative music concerts | July–August |
| 2008 | Roman Games | 3–days Roman soldiers and food theme event | August (4th weekend) |
| 2015 | Salon Sauvignon | World's best Sauvignon wine festival at Dominican Monastery Ptuj | April |
| 2017 | Open Kitchen | Various food flavours tasting at Town Square (2–3 times a year) | April–October |
| 2018 | Ptuj Opera Night at Panorama | At natural amphitheater at Panorama hill | June (end) |
| 2024 | Gala Evening of Slovenian Evergreens | part of Arsana; recorded by national television RTV Slovenia | July (2nd Friday) |
| 2026 | Festival Versia | 3–days International poetry reading and wine tasting event | August (4th weekend) |

== Gallery ==
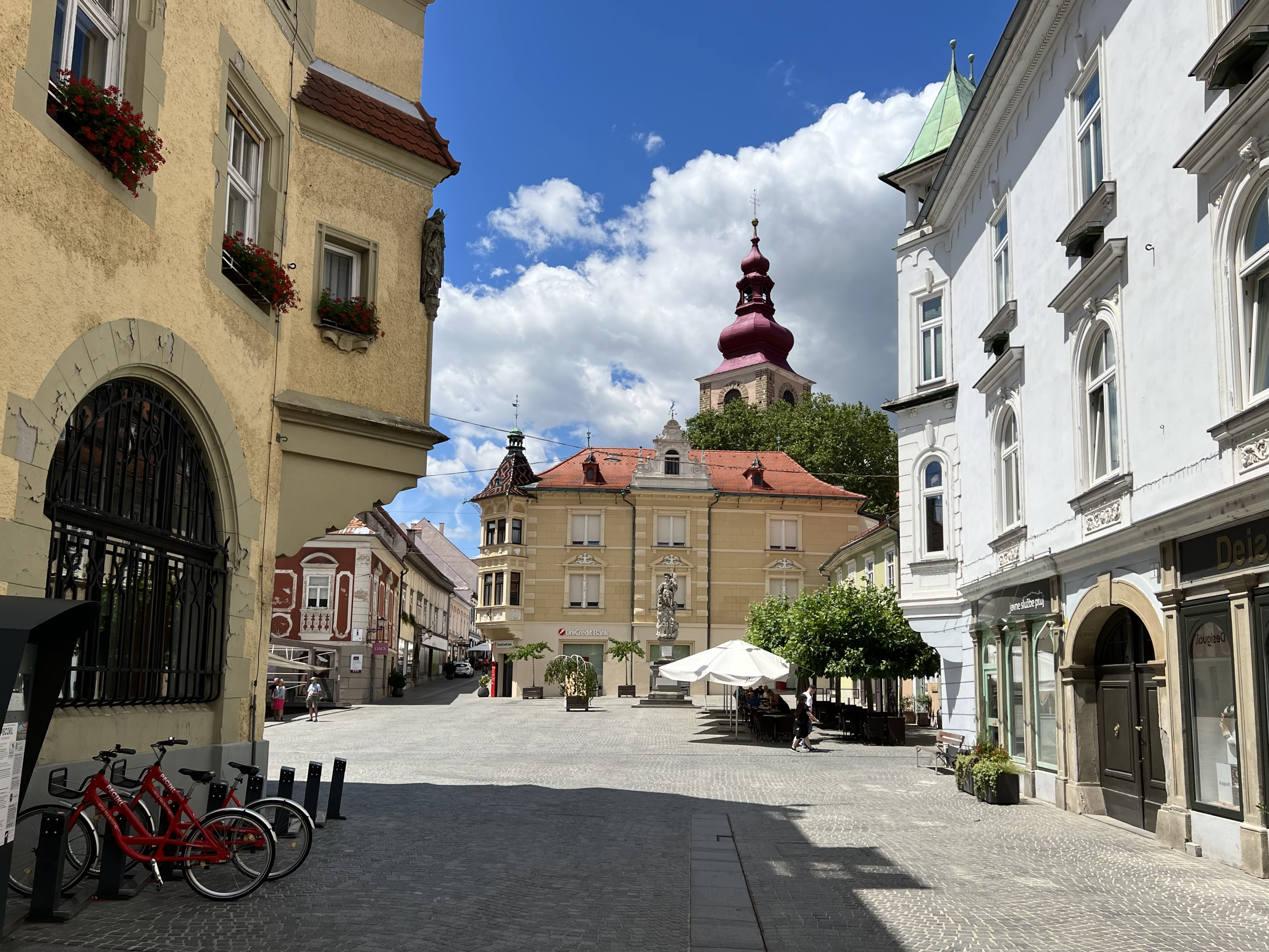
Town Square

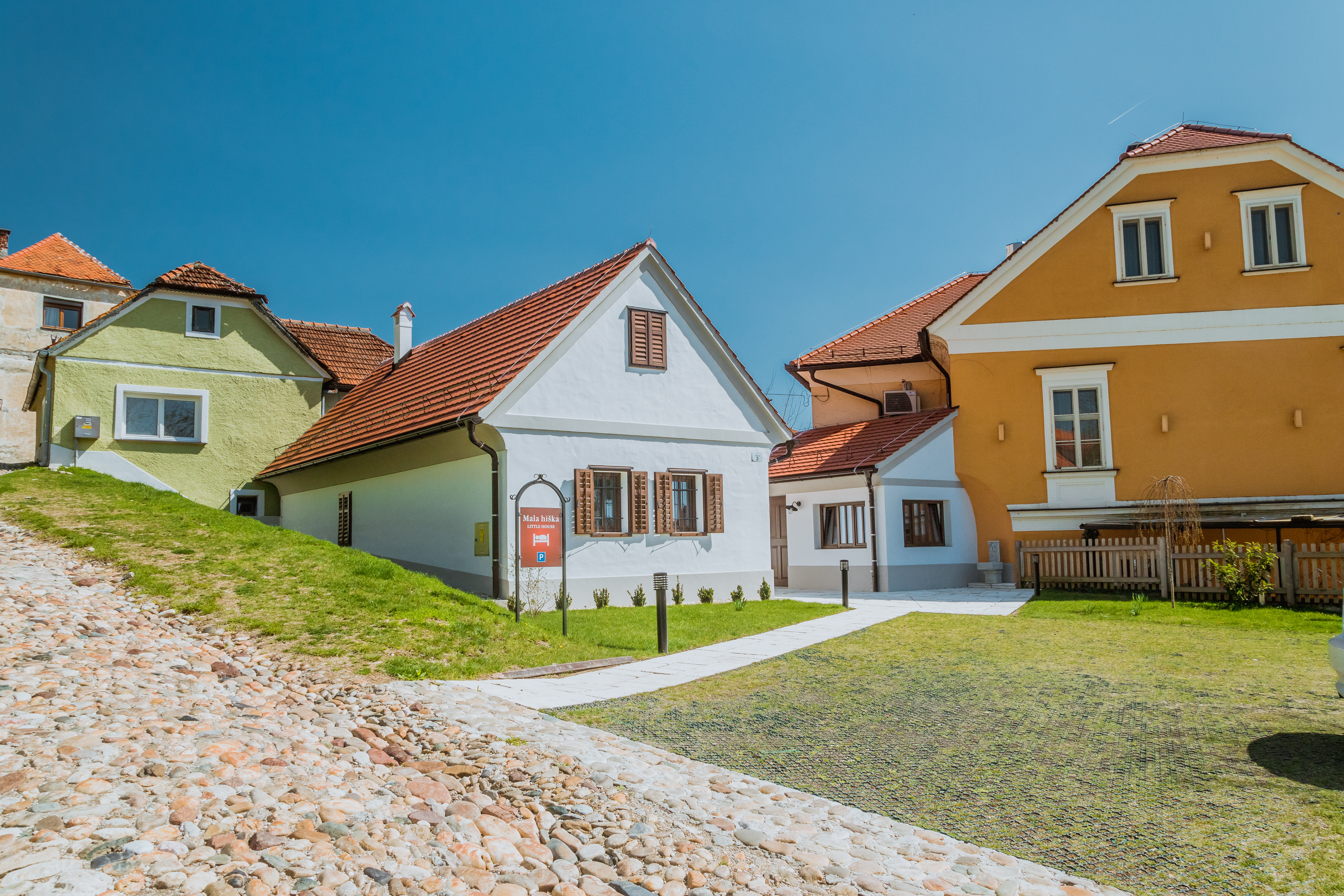
Old Houses

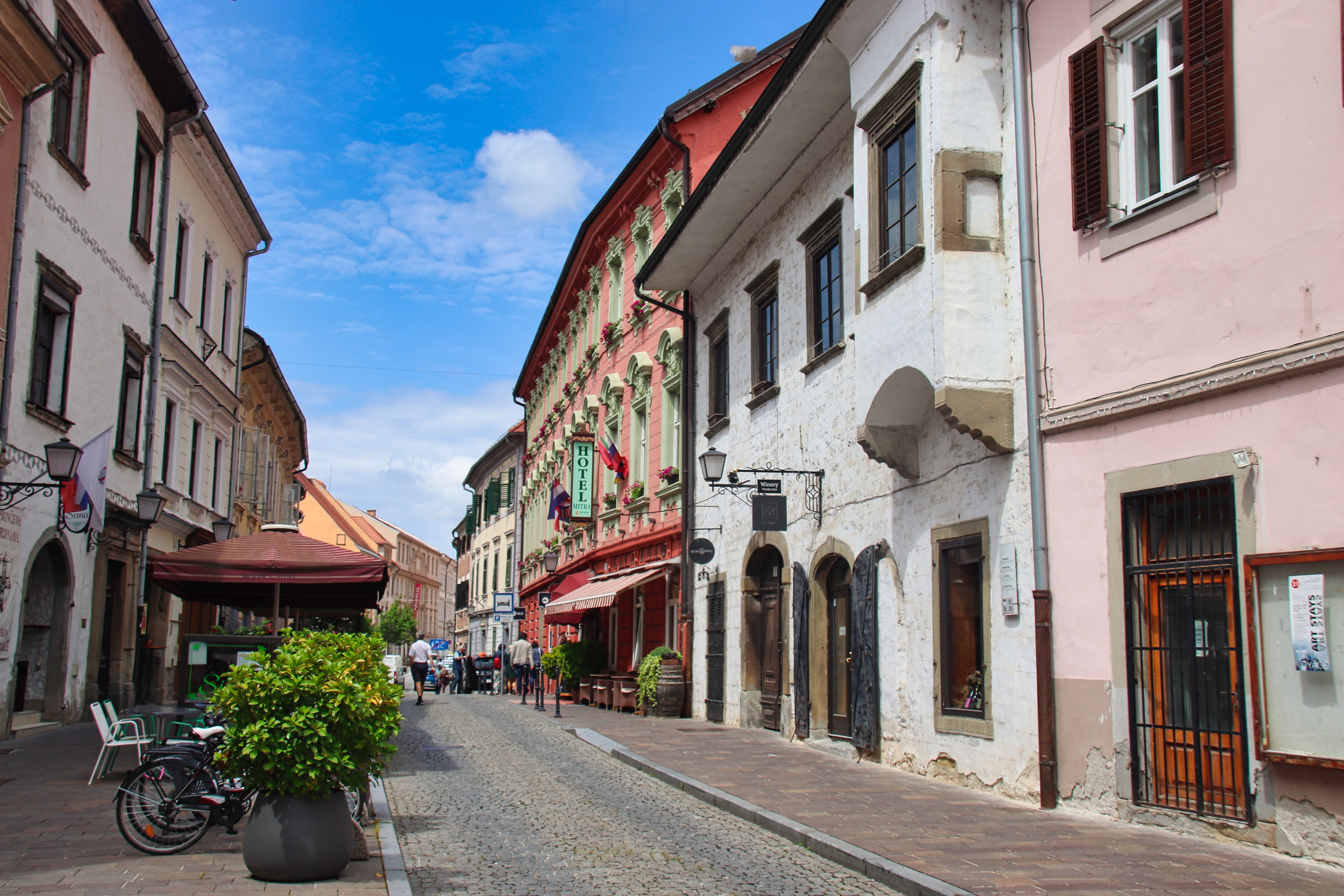
Old Town Street

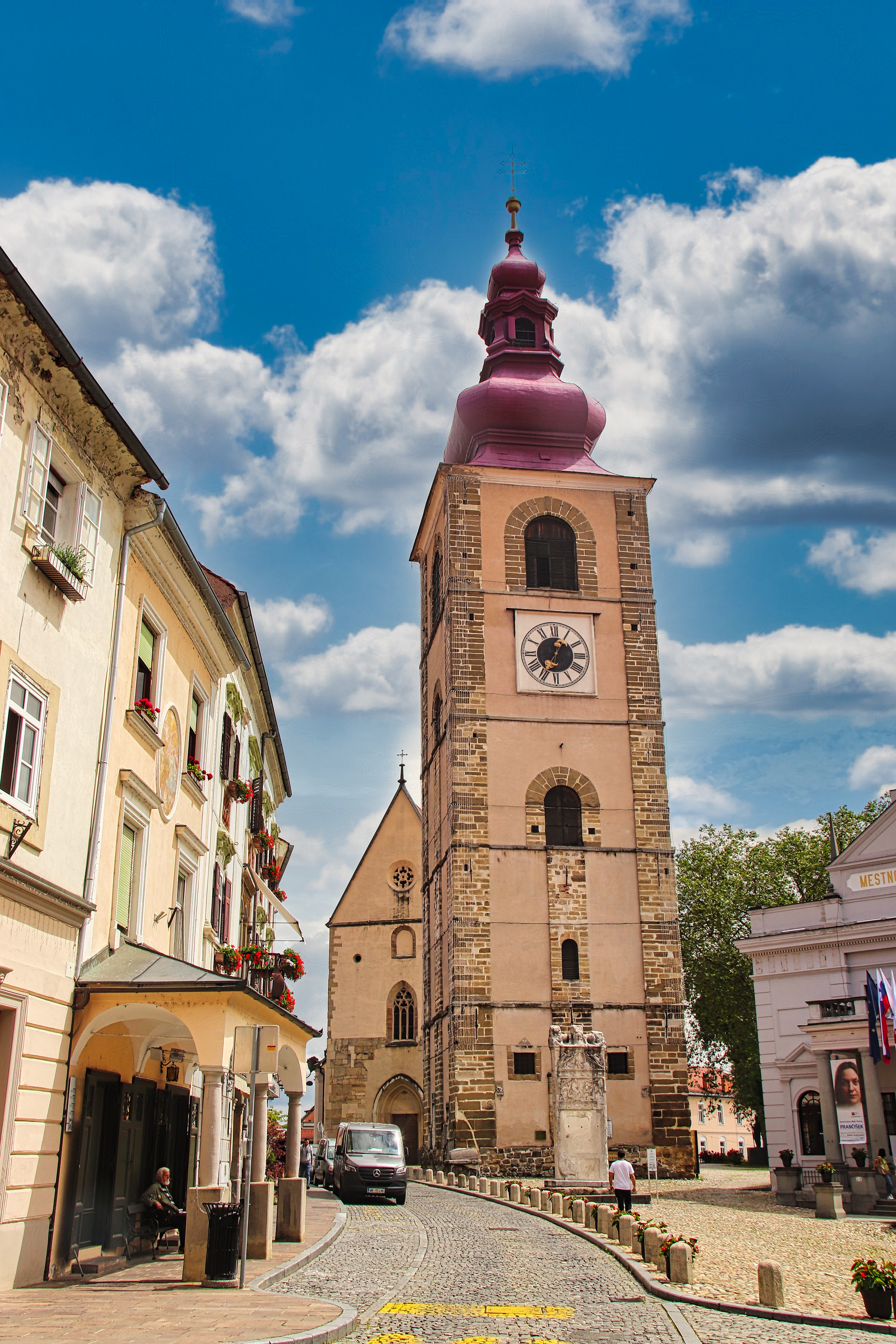
Church Tower

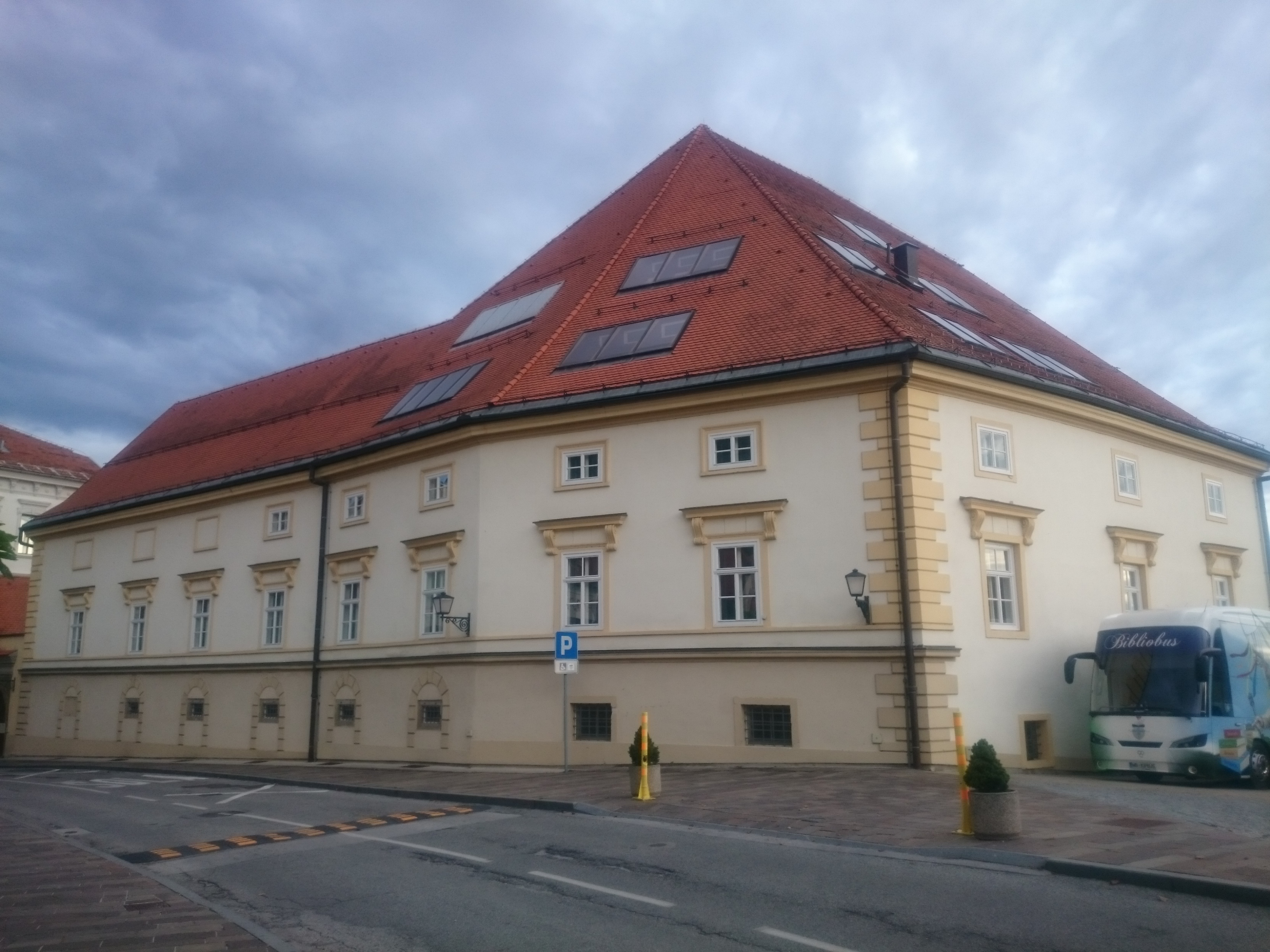
Little Castle

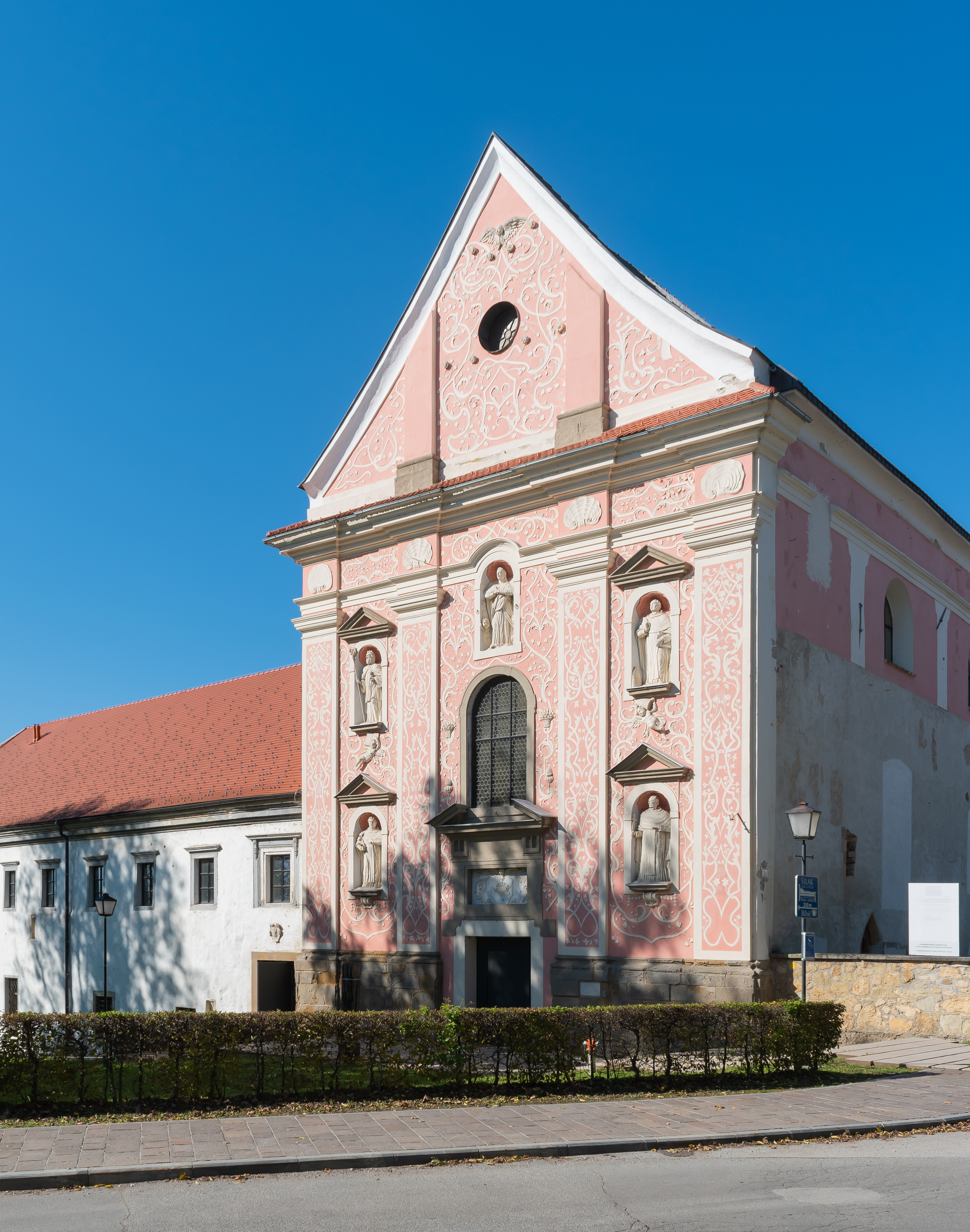
Assumption of Mary Church

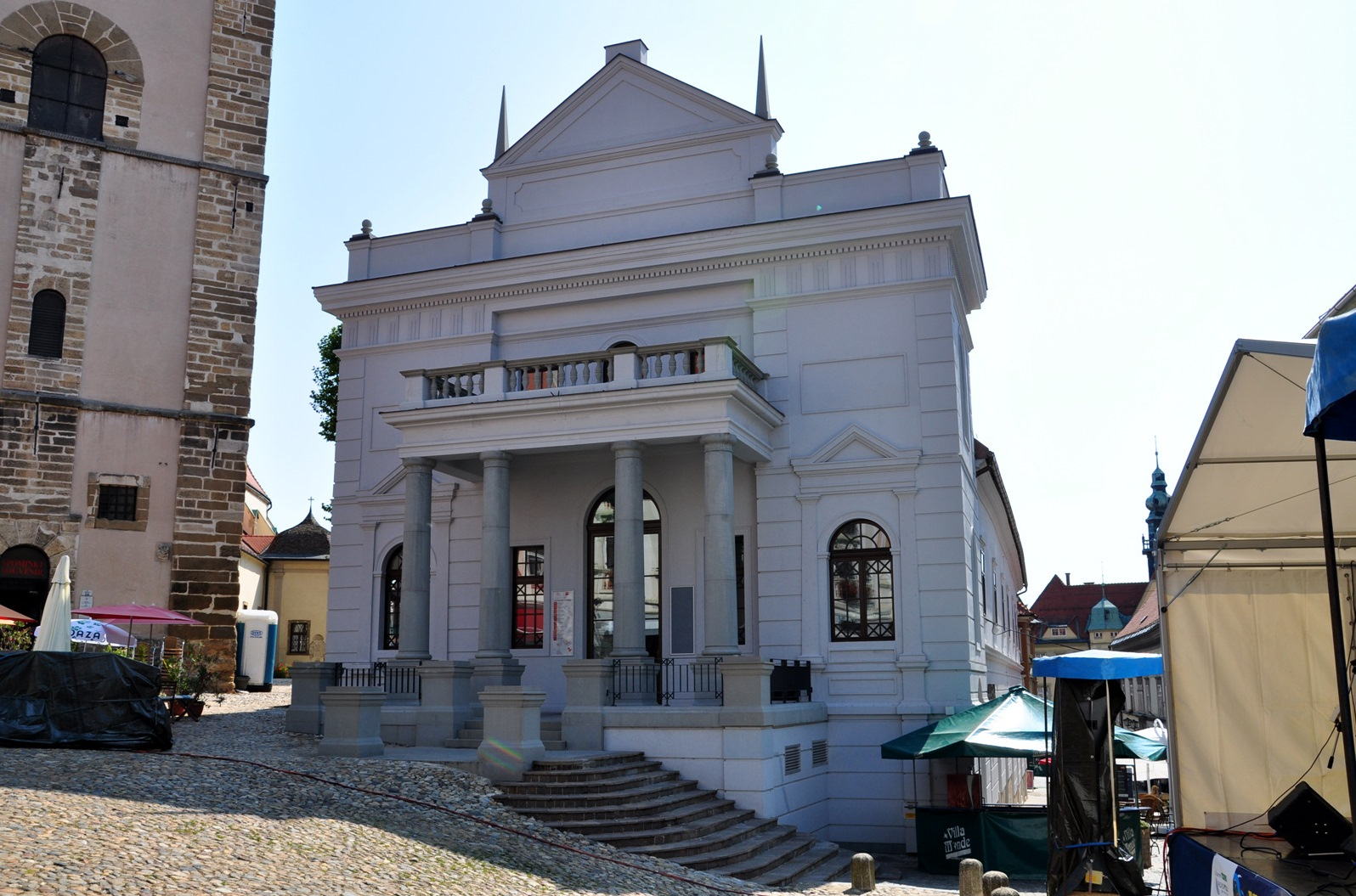
Theater

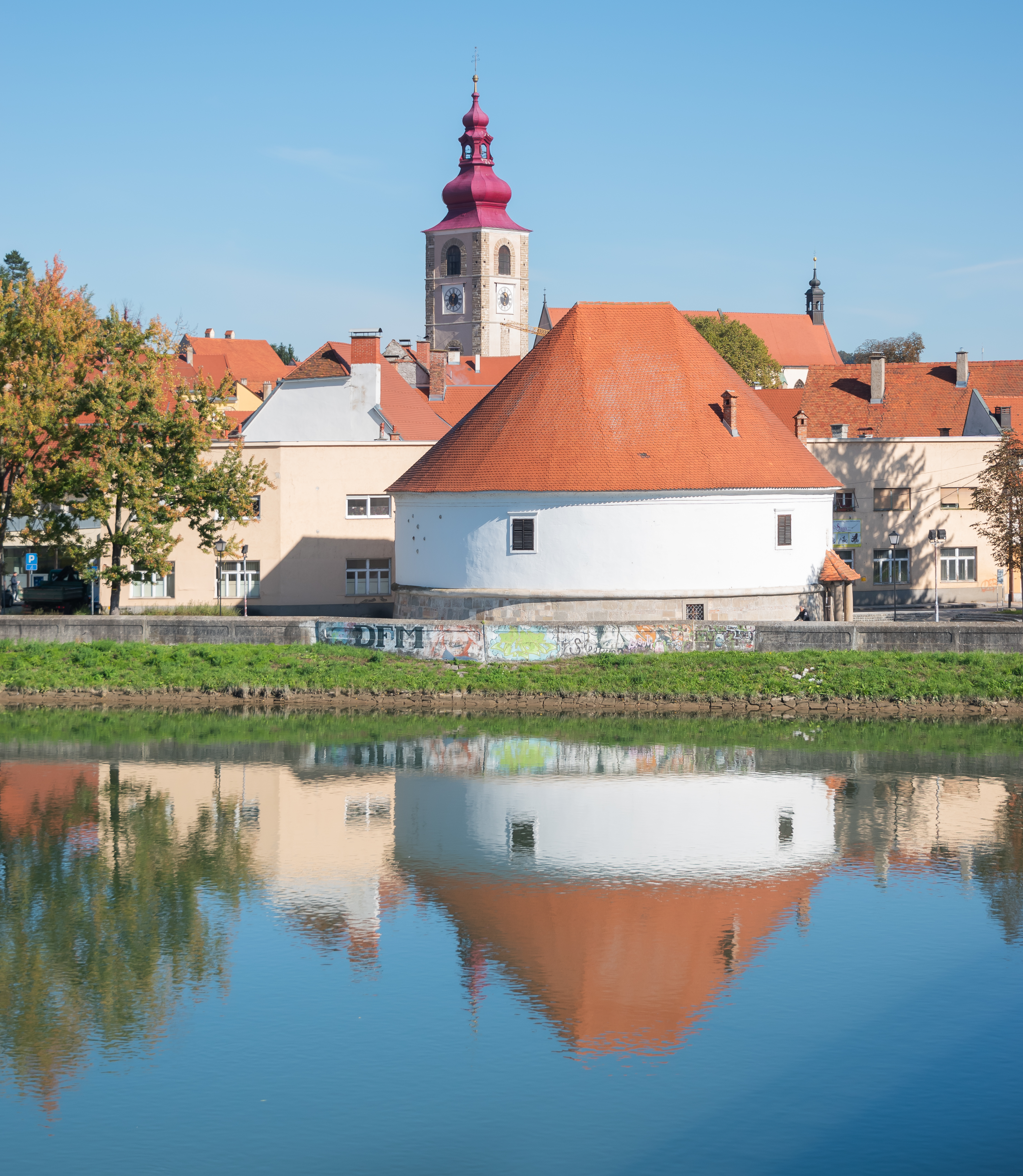
Water Tower

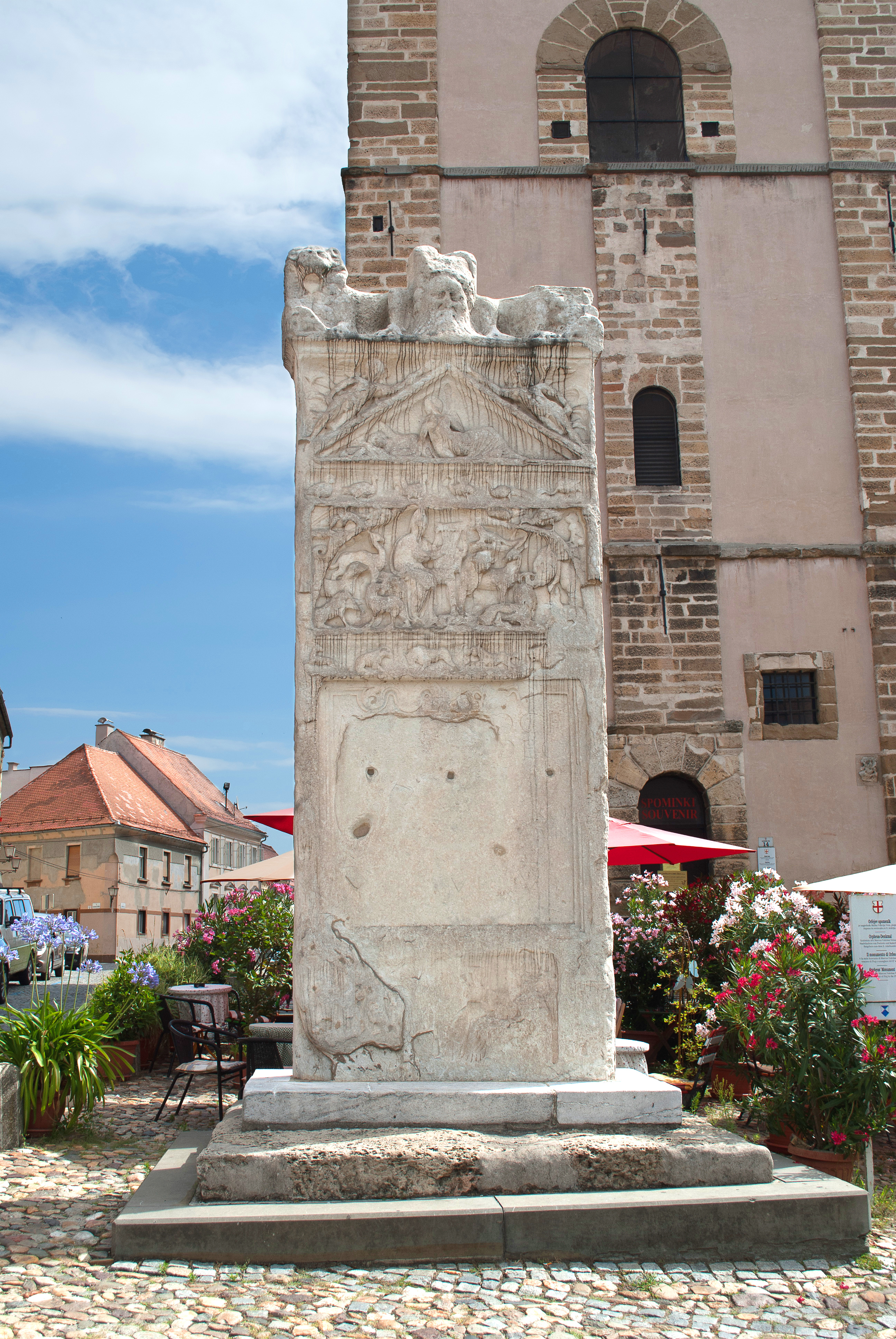
Orpheus Monument at Slovene Square

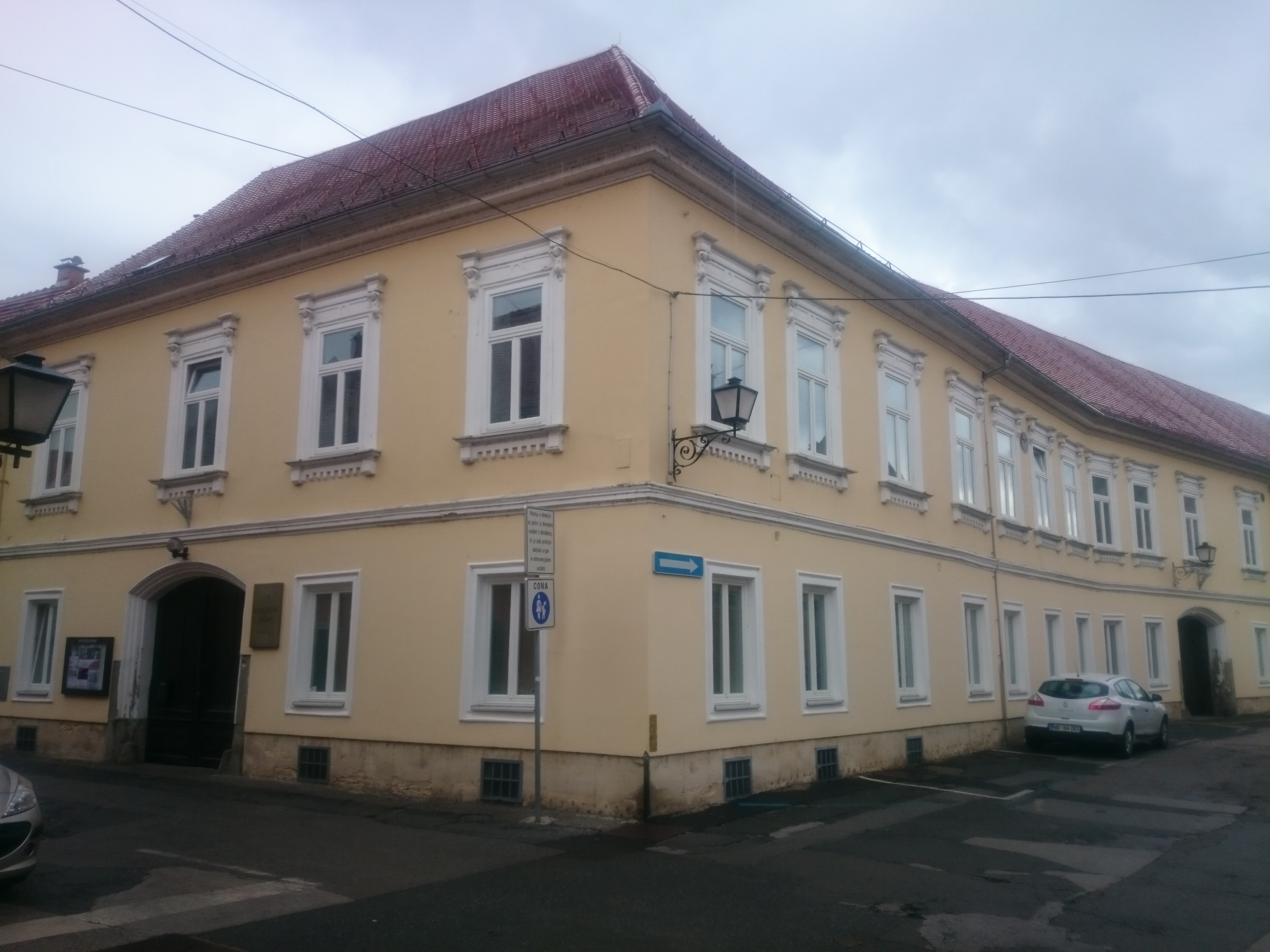
National Hall

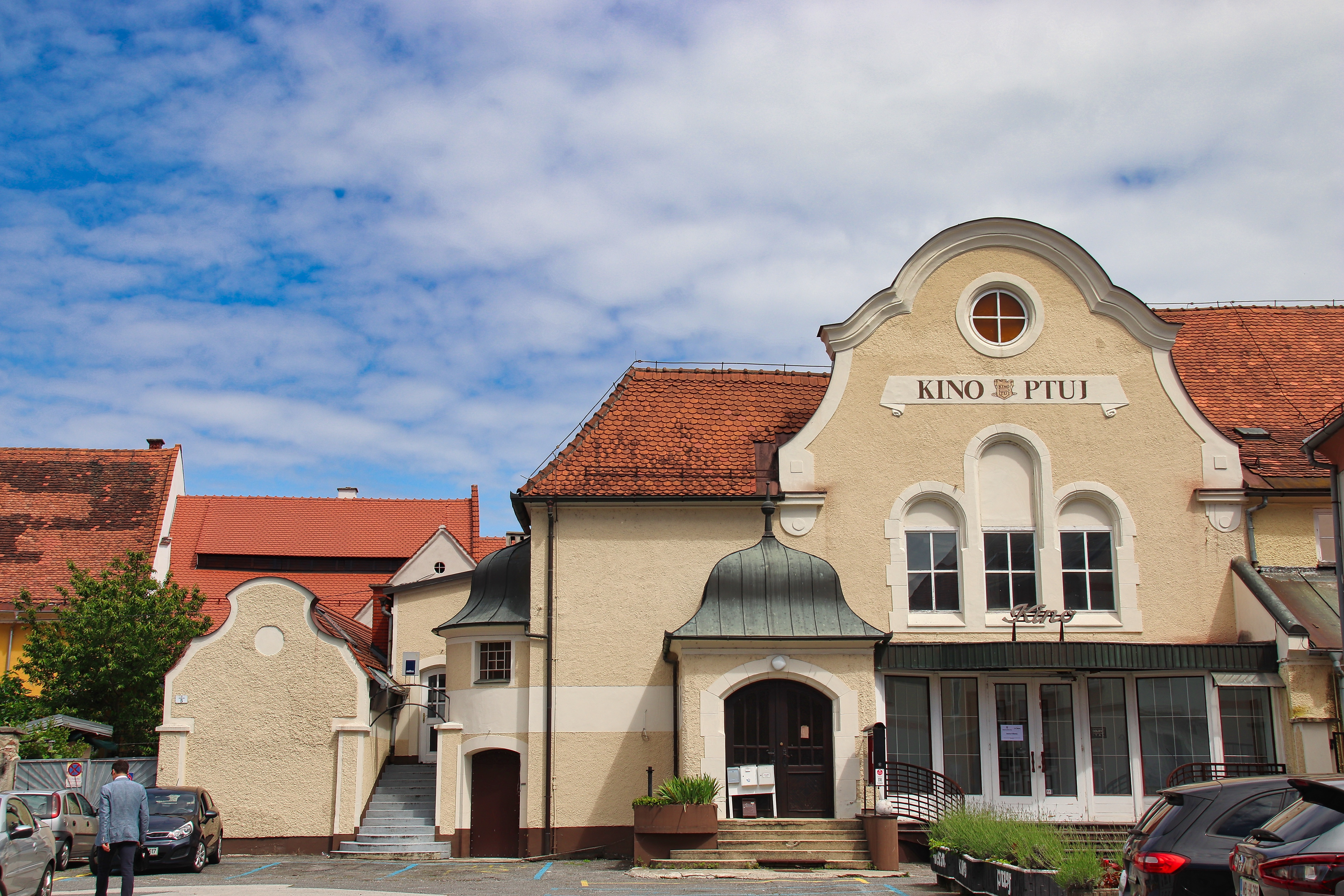
Town Cinema

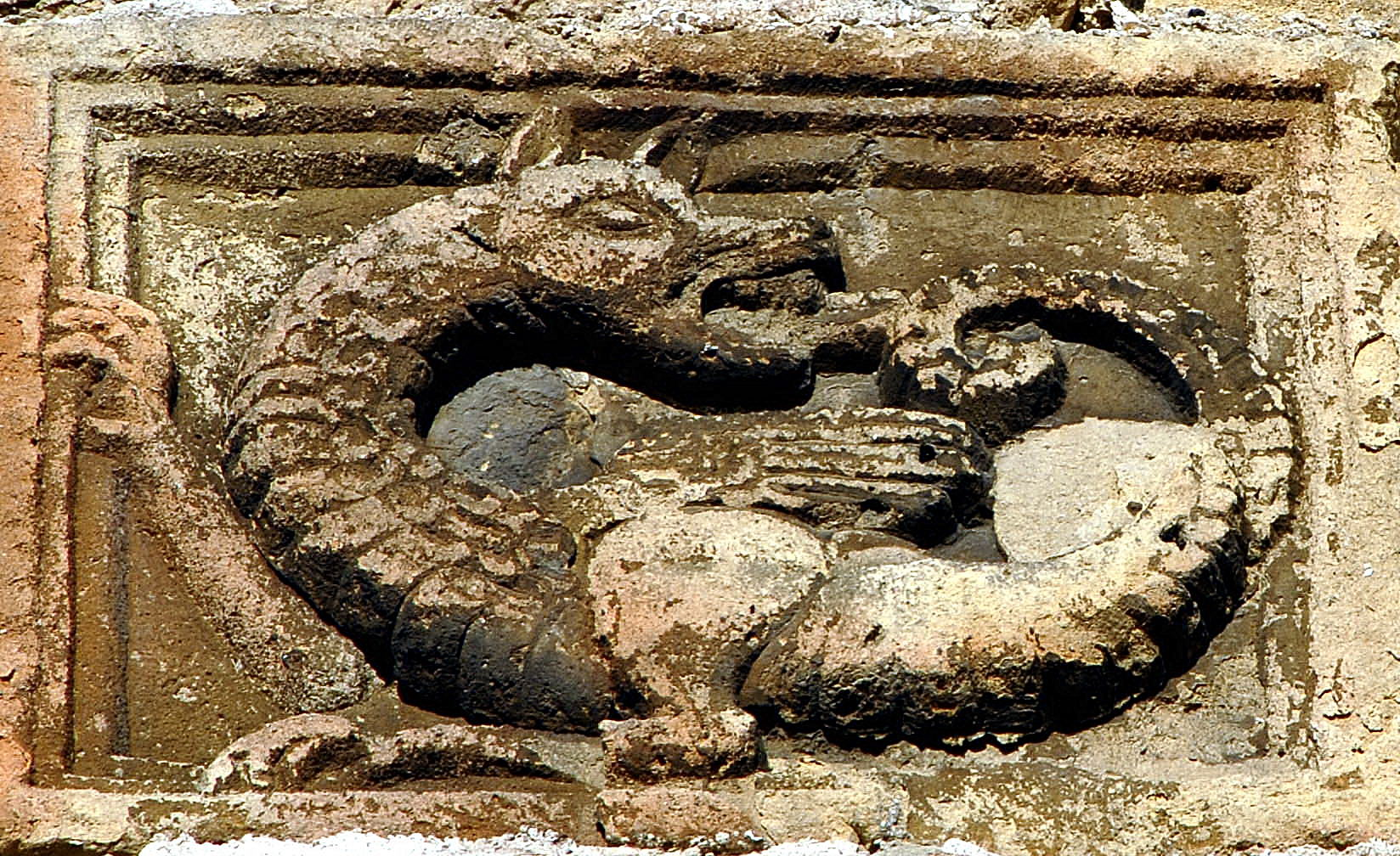
Ouroboros at Ptuj Castle

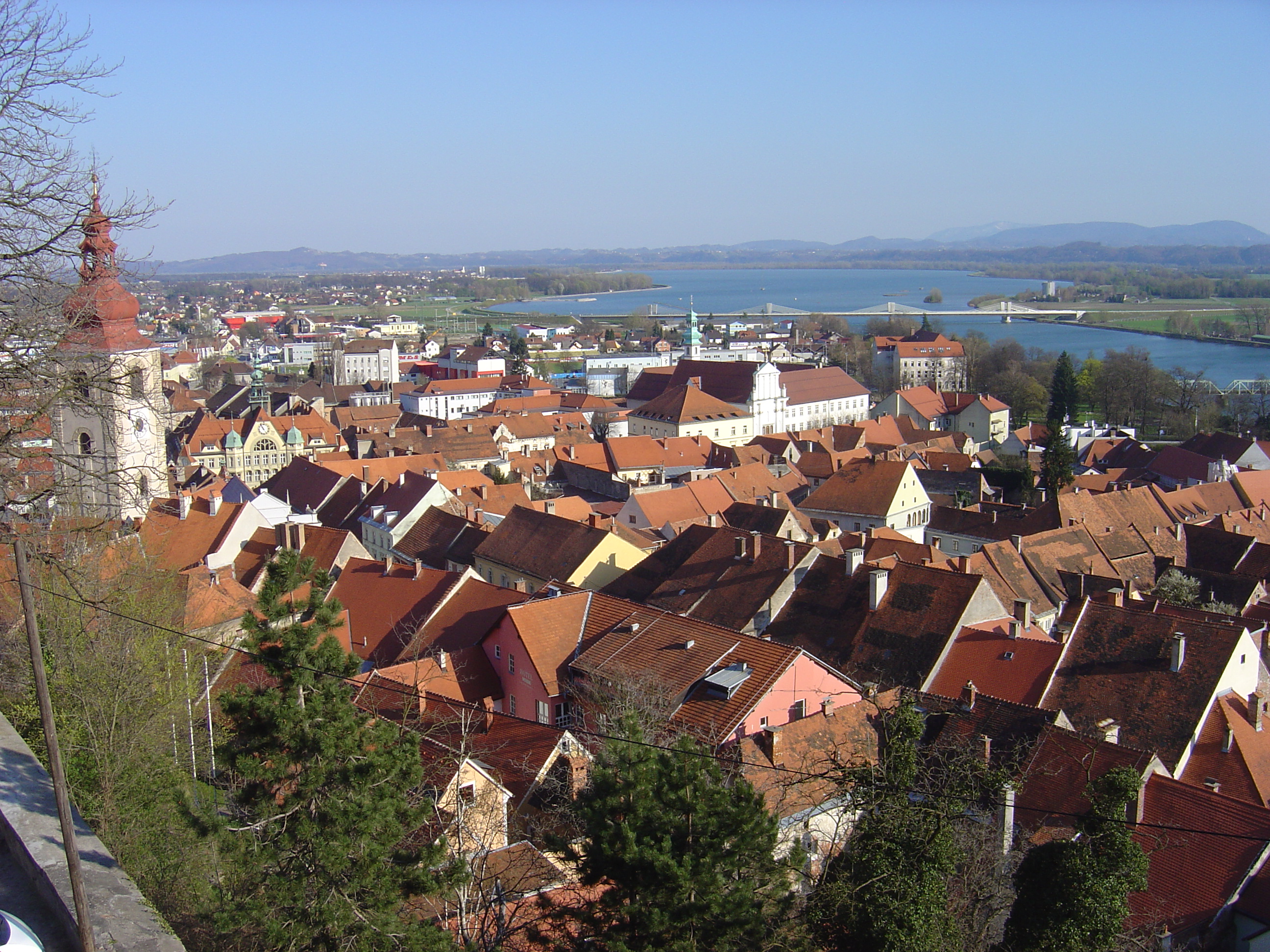
Seen from the castle

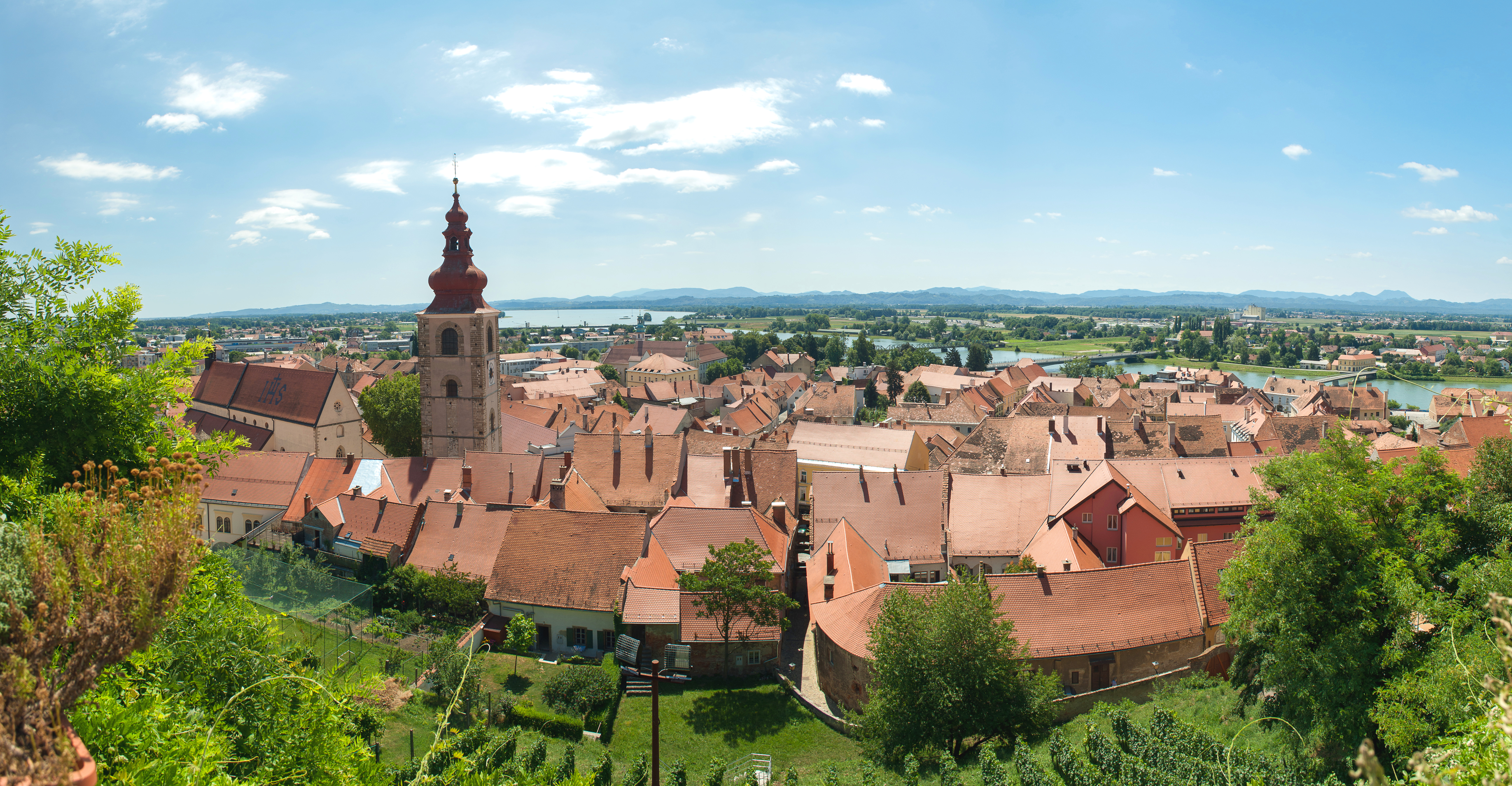
Panoramic view from Ptuj Castle

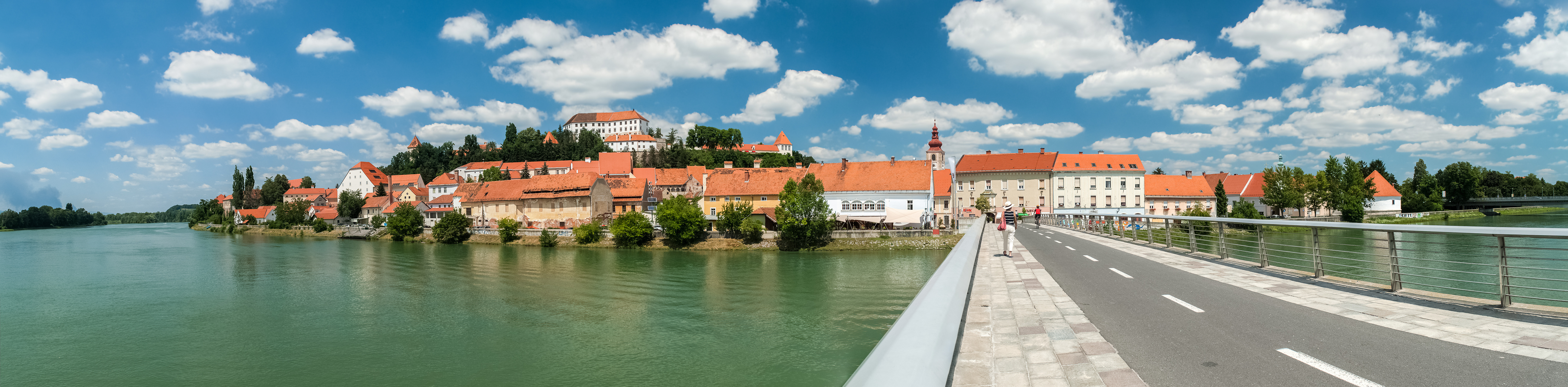
Panoramic view of Ptuj
