= Ptuj Castle =

Castle in Ptuj, Slovenia

Coordinates: 46°25′15.56″N 15°52′4.54″E

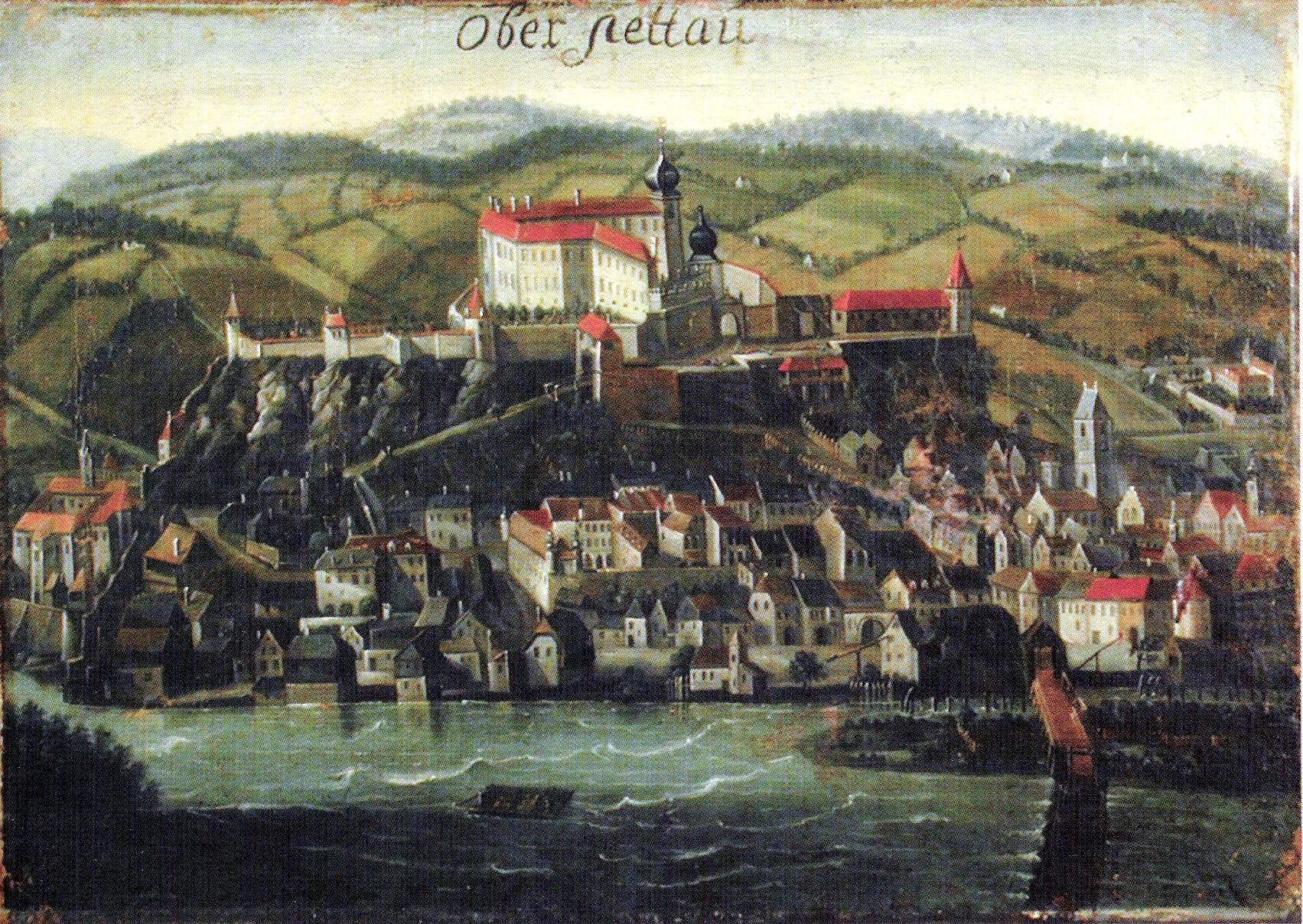
A painting of Ptuj dated 1687. The castle stands on the top of the hill overlooking the town.

Ptuj Castle (Slovene: Ptujski grad) is a castle in Ptuj, Slovenia. It stands on a hill alongside the Drava River overlooking the town, and it is a prominent landmark.

== History ==
The castle was built in the mid-12th century, when it was constructed to defend against the Hungarians. When the castle was built, the town of Ptuj was part of the Archdiocese of Salzburg.

It was owned by the Jesuits of Zagreb for some time. In 1656, due to financial hardship, the Jesuits sold the castle to the Holy Roman Field Marshal Walter Leslie, a Scot by birth. The castle was thoroughly rebuilt during the Baroque period. Due to the end of the Turkish invasions, the castle lost its defensive character. Count Walter Leslie turned it into a rural residence and the seat of a landed estate. His descendants owned it until 1802. After the extinction of this line of Leslie family, the estate was inherited by their relatives, the House of Dietrichsteins, but they became extinct in 1864 as well. After their extinction, the castle was bought in 1873 by Countess Theresia von Herberstein (1822-1895), eldest daughter of Joseph Franz, Prince of Dietrichstein. It remained in the possession of Herberstein family until 1945 when the castle became nationalized.

== Museum ==
In the years after 1945 all the buildings on the hill inside the castle were nationalized and converted into a museum of regional history.

== Gallery ==
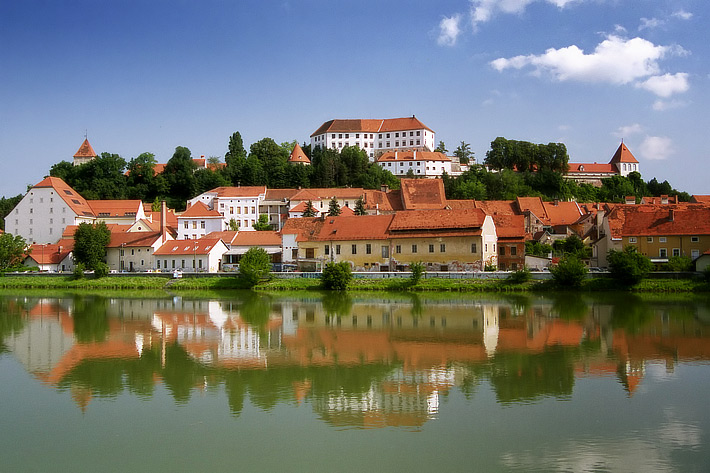
Ptuj Castle above the town

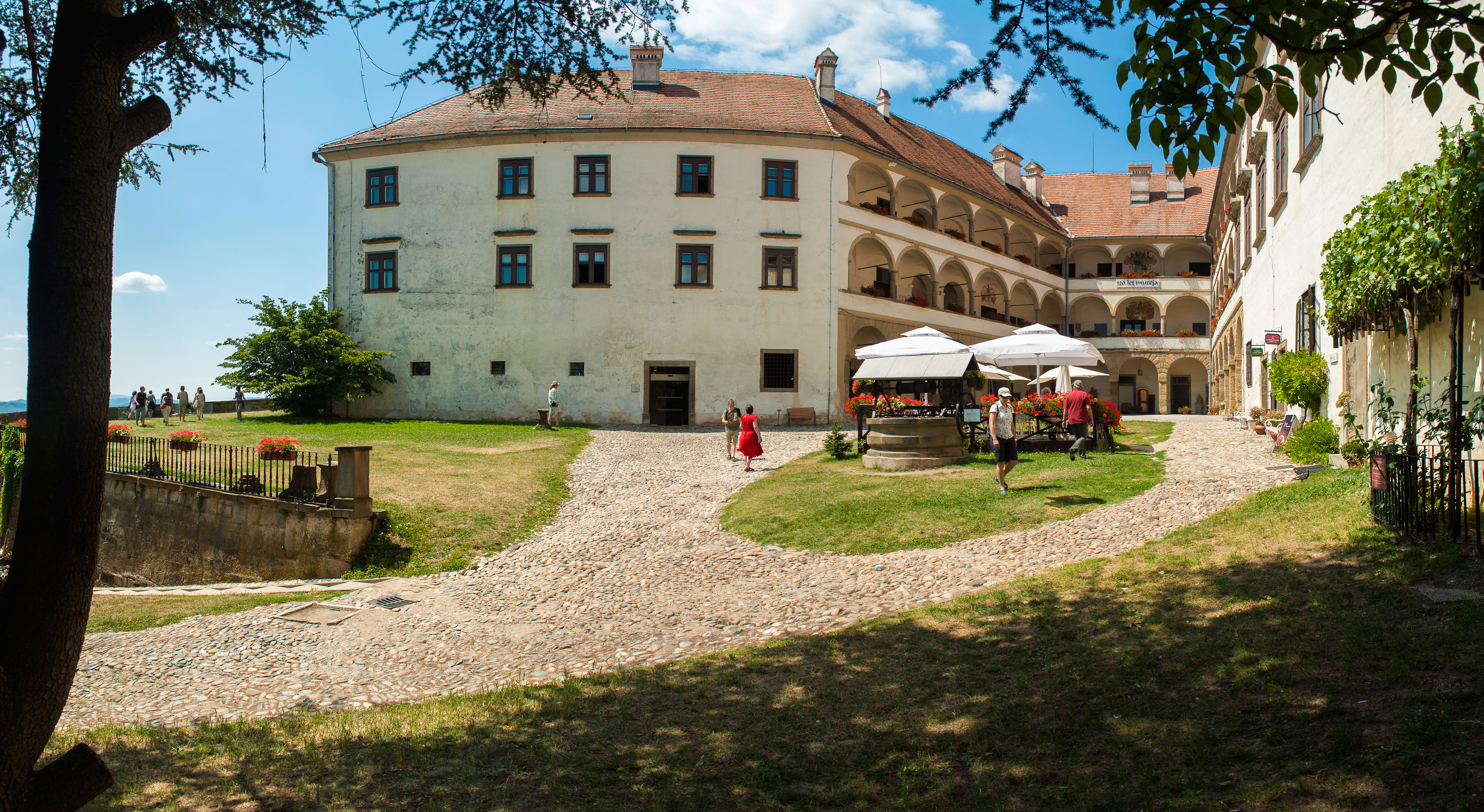
Ptuj Castle with courtyard

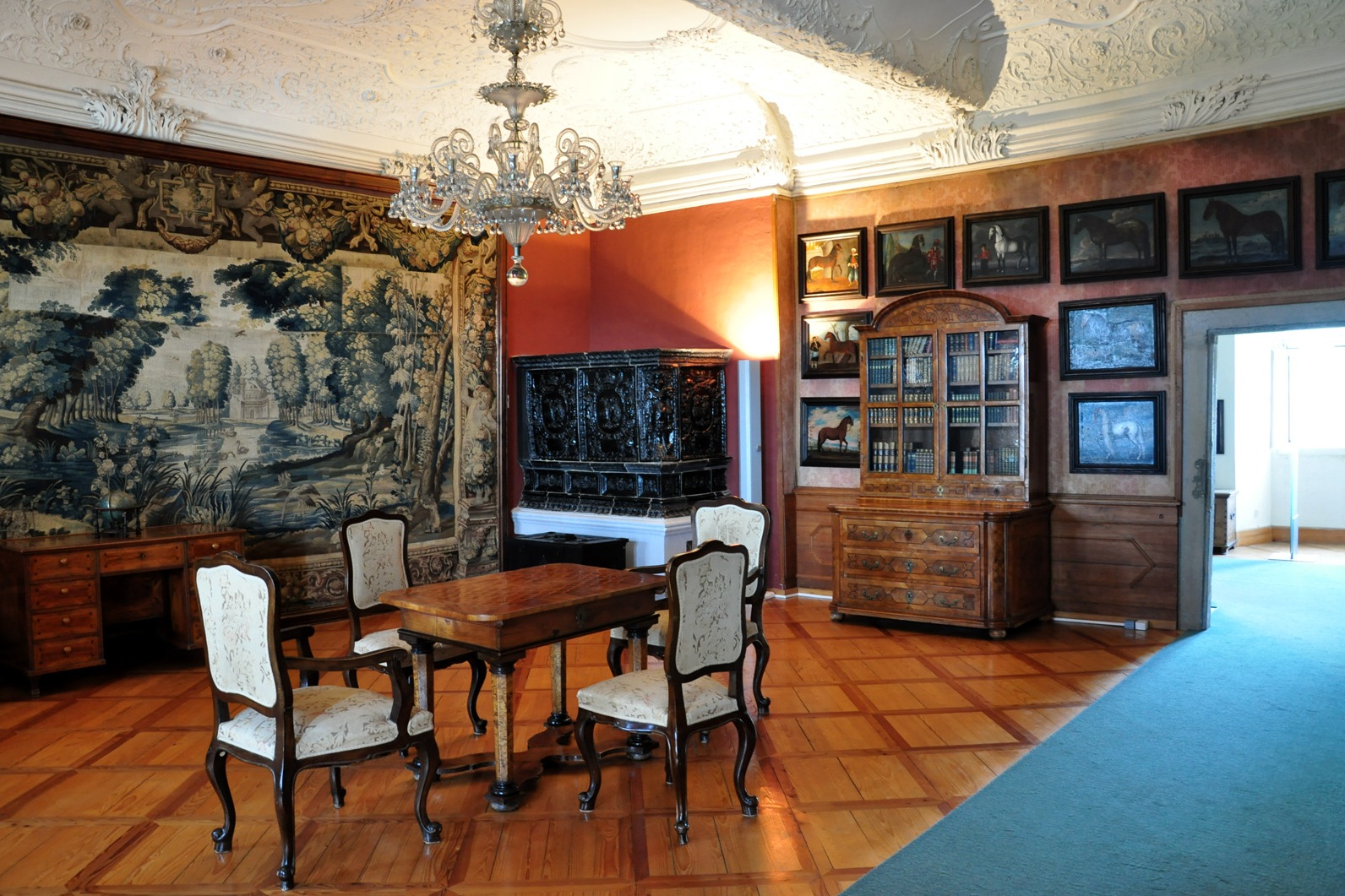
Antiques displayed in the castle

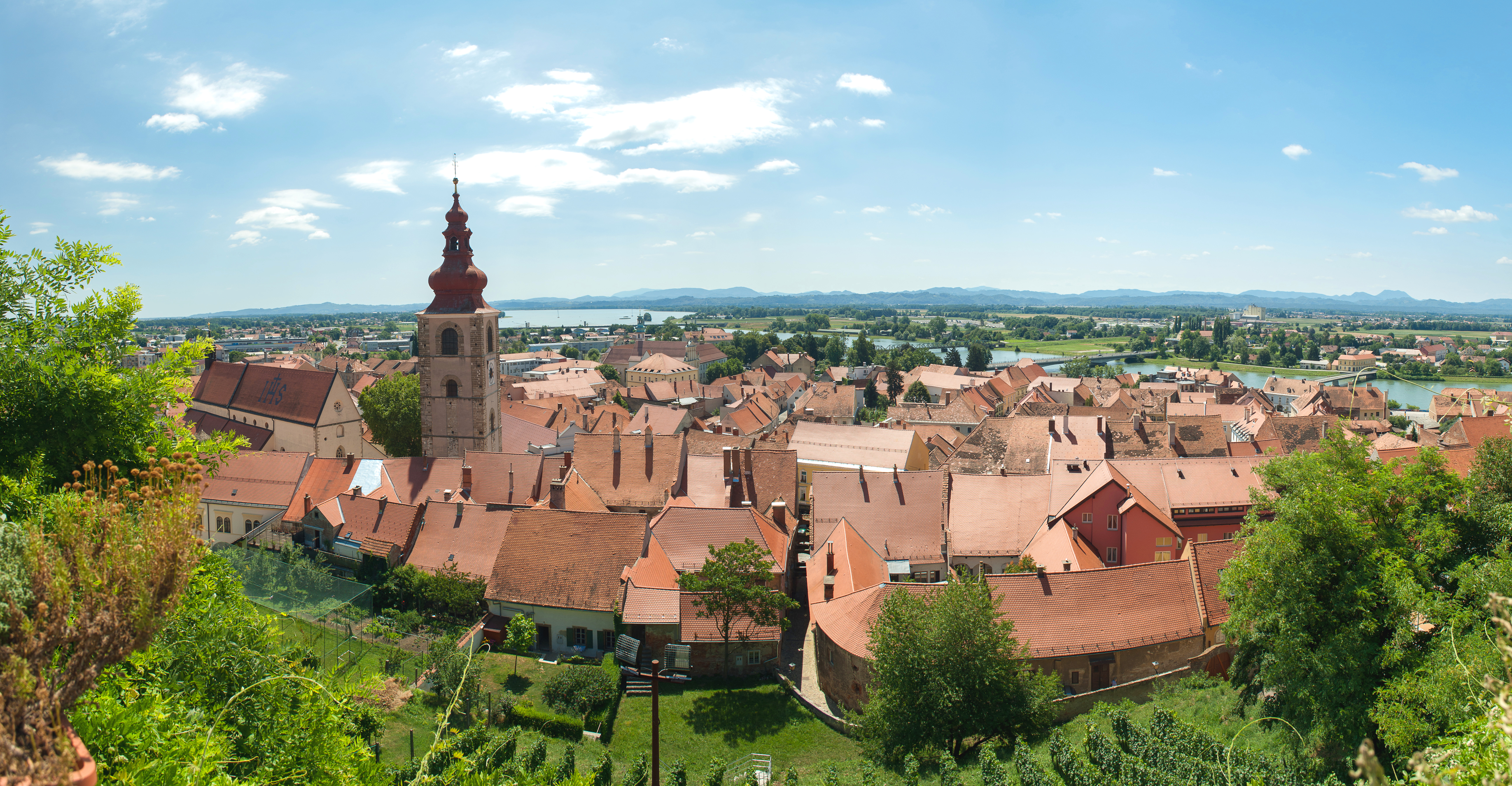
Ptuj and Lake Ptuj seen from the castle

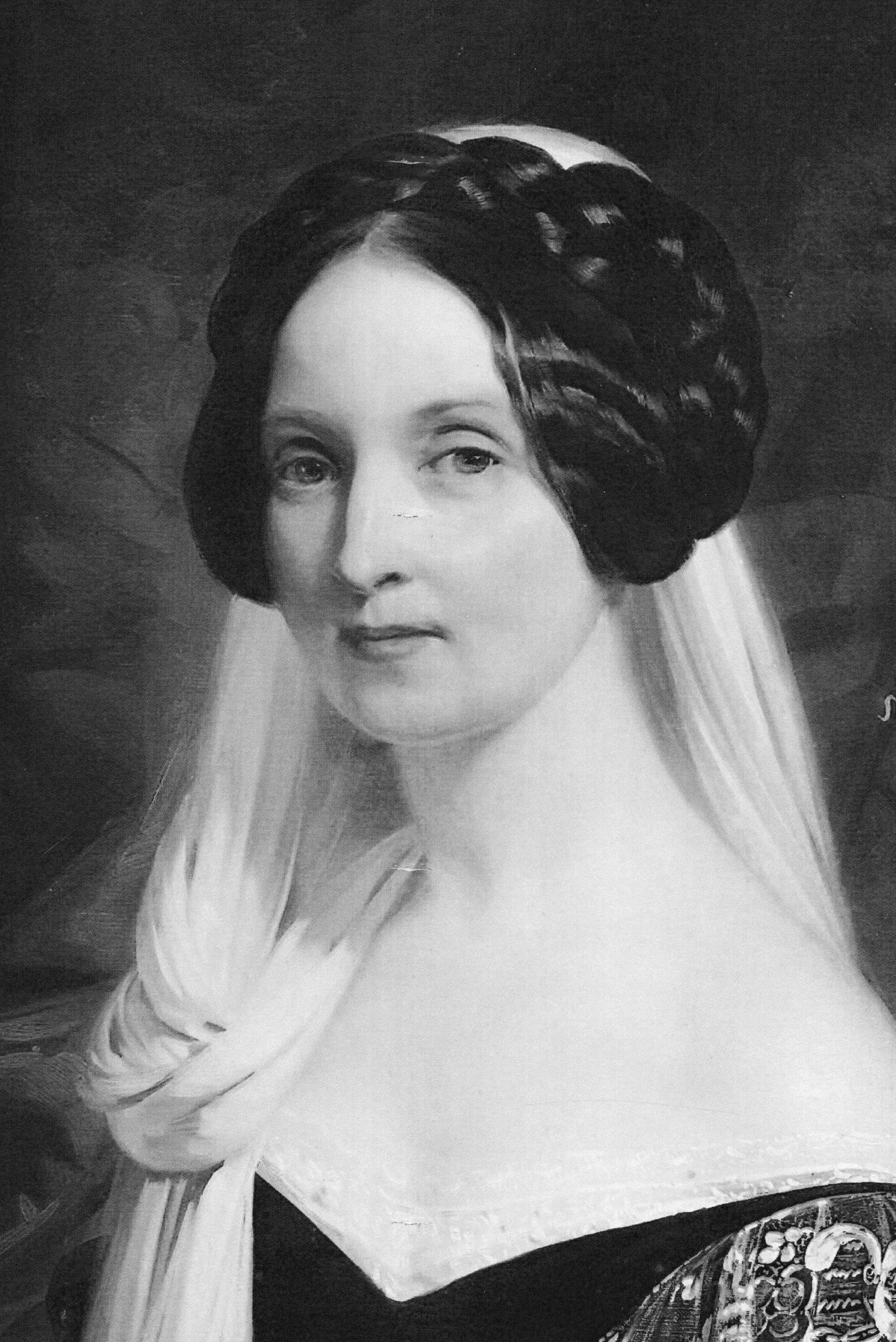
Countess Theresia von Herberstein (1822-1895), owned of the castle (1873-1897)
