= Orpheus Monument =

Roman monument in Ptuj, Slovenia

Coordinates: 46°25′12.33″N 15°52′13.37″E

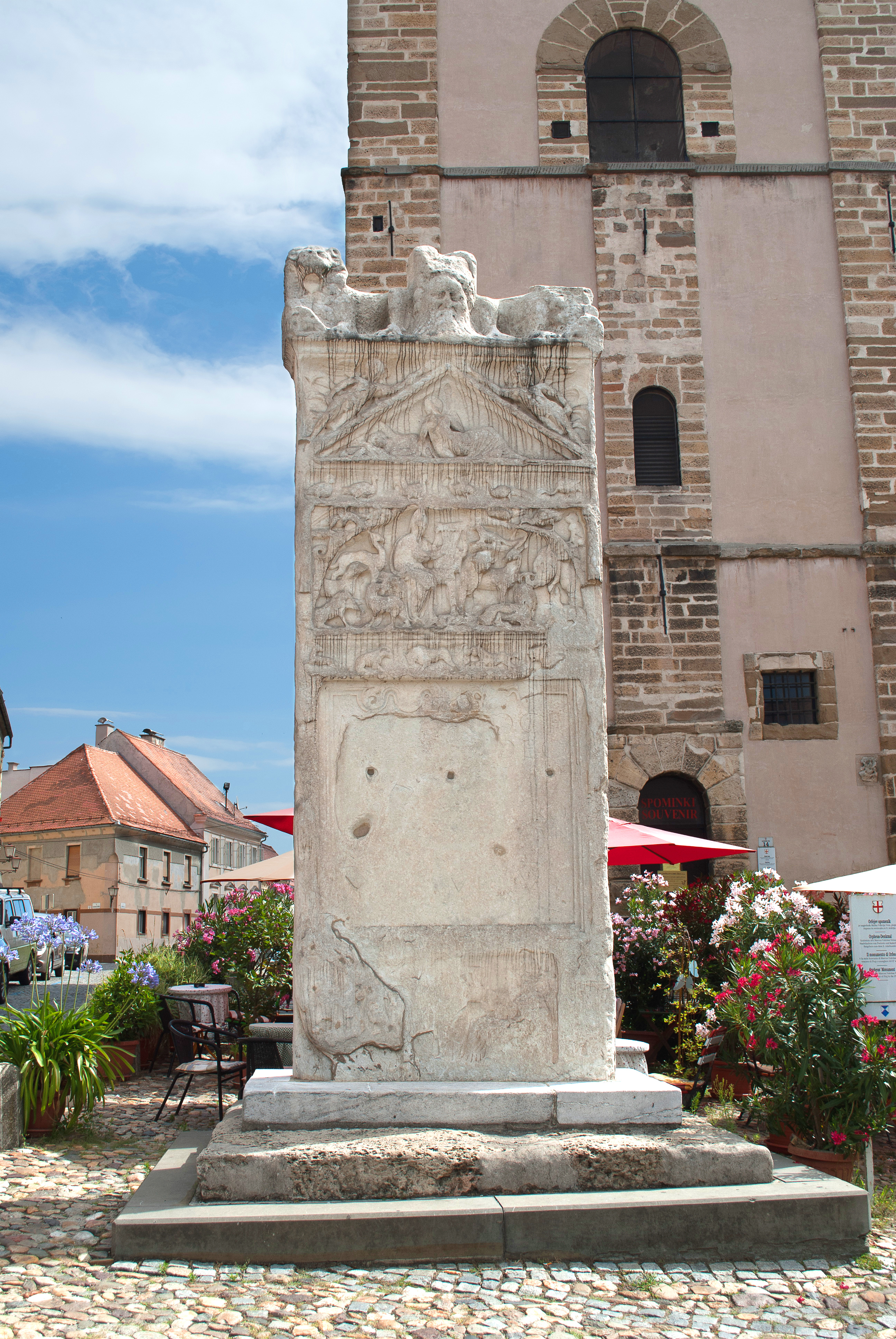
The Orpheus monument was originally a grave marker of Marcus Valerius Verus, the mayor of Poetovio in the 2nd century AD

The Orpheus Monument (Slovene: Orfejev spomenik) is a Roman monument in Ptuj, Slovenia, an almost 5 metres (16 ft) high and about 1.8 metres (5 ft 11 in) wide stele, carved of white Pohorje marble. It is located at Slovene Square (Slovene: Slovenski trg), the town's central square, in front of the Town Tower. It is the oldest public monument preserved in its original location in Slovenia, the largest discovered monument from the Roman province of the Pannonia Superior, and the symbol of Ptuj.

The monolith was originally a grave marker, erected in the 2nd century AD to honor the memory of Marcus Valerius Verus, the duumvir (mayor) of Roman Poetovio. In the Middle Ages, it was used as a pillory. Criminals were tied to the iron rings attached to its lower part. Since March 2008, it has the status of a national cultural monument.

The central relief illustrates scenes from the myth of Orpheus, who plays the lyre while mourning his lost love Eurydice. Other reliefs depict the Greek-Egyptian god Serapis, who symbolizes the hope of resurrection. The corners each contain a prone lion gnawing on a ram's head. Beneath this, a relief in the tympanum depicts the Moon goddess Selene, leaning over her dead lover Endymion. All the reliefs and inscriptions are badly eroded.
