= List of cities, towns, and villages in Slovenia: G =

This is a list of cities, towns, and villages in Slovenia, starting with G.

Settlement	Municipality
Gaber pri Črmošnjicah	Semič
Gaber pri Semiču	Semič
Gaberje	Ajdovščina
Gaberje	Lendava
Gaberke	Šoštanj
Gabernik	Slovenska Bistrica
Gabrc	Sveti Jurij ob Ščavnici
Gabrce	Rogaška Slatina
Gabrče	Divača
Gabrijele	Sevnica
Gabrje pod Limbarsko Goro	Moravče
Gabrje pod Špilkom	Lukovica
Gabrje pri Dobovi	Brežice
Gabrje pri Ilovi Gori	Grosuplje
Gabrje pri Jančah	Ljubljana
Gabrje pri Soteski	Dolenjske Toplice
Gabrje pri Stični	Ivančna Gorica
Gabrje	Dobrova-Polhov Gradec
Gabrje	Novo Mesto
Gabrje	Sevnica
Gabrje	Tolmin
Gabrk	Ilirska Bistrica
Gabrk	Škofja Loka
Gabrnik	Juršinci
Gabrnik	Škocjan
Gabrno	Laško
Gabrovčec	Ivančna Gorica
Gabrovec pri Dramljah	Vojnik
Gabrovec pri Kostrivnici	Rogaška Slatina
Gabrovica pri Črnem Kalu	Koper
Gabrovica pri Komnu	Komen
Gabrovka pri Zagradcu	Ivančna Gorica
Gabrovka	Litija
Gabrovlje	Slovenske Konjice
Gabrovnica	Kamnik
Gabrovnik	Slovenske Konjice
Gabrovo	Škofja Loka
Gabrska Gora	Litija
Gabrsko	Trbovlje
Gabrška Gora	Škofja Loka
Gačnik	Pesnica
Gaj nad Mariborom	Maribor
Gaj	Brežice
Gaj	Slovenska Bistrica
Gaj	Šmarje pri Jelšah
Gajevci	Gorišnica
Gajniče	Grosuplje
Gajševci	Križevci
Galantiči	Koper
Galicija	Žalec
Galušak	Sveti Jurij ob Ščavnici
Gančani	Beltinci
Gašpinovo	Ribnica
Gatina	Grosuplje
Gavce	Šmartno ob Paki
Gazice	Brežice
Gažon	Koper
Gederovci	Tišina (občina)
Genterovci	Lendava
Gerečja vas	Hajdina
Gerlinci	Cankova
Geršiči	Metlika
Gibina	Razkrižje
Gibina	Sveti Andraž v Slovenskih goricah
Gladloka	Kostel
Gladomes	Slovenska Bistrica
Glažuta	Loški Potok
Glem	Koper
Glina	Bloke
Glinek	Škofljica
Glinek	Mirna
Glinje	Braslovče
Glinje	Cerklje na Gorenjskem
Glinsko	Celje
Globel	Sodražica
Globočdol	Mirna Peč
Globoče	Vojnik
Globočice pri Kostanjevici	Krško
Globočice	Brežice
Globoka	Ljutomer
Globoko ob Dravinji	Slovenska Bistrica
Globoko pri Šmarju	Šmarje pri Jelšah
Globoko	Brežice
Globoko	Laško
Globoko	Radovljica
Glogov Brod	Brežice
Glogovica	Ivančna Gorica
Gmajna	Krško
Gmajna	Slovenj Gradec
Gmajnica	Komenda
Gobnik	Litija
Gobovce	Naklo
Goče	Vipava
Gočova	Lenart
Godemarci	Ljutomer
Godeninci	Ormož
Godešič	Škofja Loka
Godič	Kamnik
Godičevo	Bloke
Godnje	Sežana
Godovič	Idrija
Gojače	Ajdovščina
Golac	Hrpelje-Kozina
Golavabuka	Slovenj Gradec
Golčaj	Lukovica
Golče	Zagorje ob Savi
Golek pri Vinici	Črnomelj
Golek	Črnomelj
Golek	Krško
Goli Vrh	Gorenja vas-Poljane
Goli Vrh	Krško
Golica	Železniki
Golice	Kamnik
Golišče	Litija
Goljek	Trebnje
Golnik	Kranj
Golo Brdo	Brda
Golo Brdo	Medvode
Golo	Ig
Golobinjek ob Sotli	Podčetrtek
Golobinjek pri Planini	Šentjur
Golobinjek	Mirna Peč
Golušnik	Novo Mesto
Gombišče	Trebnje
Gomila pri Kogu	Ormož
Gomila	Destrnik
Gomila	Mirna
Gomilci	Destrnik
Gomilica	Turnišče
Gomilsko	Braslovče
Gonjače	Brda
Gora pri Komendi	Komenda
Gora pri Pečah	Moravče
Gora	Cerknica
Gora	Krško
Gorca	Podlehnik
Gorče	Dravograd
Gore	Hrastnik
Gore	Idrija
Goreljce	Radeče
Goreljek	Bohinj
Gorenja Brezovica	Brezovica
Gorenja Brezovica	Šentjernej
Gorenja Dobrava	Gorenja vas-Poljane
Gorenja Dobrava	Trebnje
Gorenja Gomila	Šentjernej
Gorenja Kanomlja	Idrija
Gorenja Lepa vas	Krško
Gorenja Nemška vas	Trebnje
Gorenja Pirošica	Brežice
Gorenja Podgora	Črnomelj
Gorenja Ravan	Gorenja vas-Poljane
Gorenja Stara vas	Šentjernej
Gorenja Trebuša	Tolmin
Gorenja vas - Reteče	Škofja Loka
Gorenja vas pri Čatežu	Trebnje
Gorenja vas pri Leskovcu	Krško
Gorenja Vas pri Mirni	Mirna
Gorenja vas pri Mokronogu	Trebnje
Gorenja vas pri Polici	Grosuplje
Gorenja vas pri Šmarjeti	Novo Mesto
Gorenja vas	Gorenja vas-Poljane
Gorenja vas	Ivančna Gorica
Gorenja vas	Kanal
Gorenja vas	Mirna
Gorenja vas	Zagorje ob Savi
Gorenja Žaga	Kostel
Gorenja Žetina	Gorenja vas-Poljane
Gorenjci pri Adlešičih	Črnomelj
Gorenje Blato	Škofljica
Gorenje Brdo	Gorenja vas-Poljane
Gorenje Brezovo	Ivančna Gorica
Gorenje Dole	Krško
Gorenje Dole	Škocjan
Gorenje Gradišče pri Šentjerneju	Šentjernej
Gorenje Gradišče	Dolenjske Toplice
Gorenje Grčevje	Novo Mesto
Gorenje Jelenje	Litija
Gorenje Jesenice	Trebnje
Gorenje Jezero	Cerknica
Gorenje Kališče	Velike Lašče
Gorenje Kamence	Novo Mesto
Gorenje Kamenje pri Dobrniču	Trebnje
Gorenje Kamenje	Novo Mesto
Gorenje Karteljevo	Novo Mesto
Gorenje Kronovo	Novo Mesto
Gorenje Laknice	Trebnje
Gorenje Lakovnice	Novo Mesto
Gorenje Medvedje Selo	Trebnje
Gorenje Mokro Polje	Šentjernej
Gorenje Mraševo	Novo Mesto
Gorenje Otave	Cerknica
Gorenje Podpoljane	Ribnica
Gorenje Polje	Dolenjske Toplice
Gorenje Ponikve	Trebnje
Gorenje pri Divači	Sežana
Gorenje pri Zrečah	Zreče
Gorenje Radulje	Škocjan
Gorenje Selce	Trebnje
Gorenje Skopice	Brežice
Gorenje Sušice	Dolenjske Toplice
Gorenje Vrhpolje	Šentjernej
Gorenje Zabukovje	Trebnje
Gorenje	Kočevje
Gorenje	Lukovica
Gorenje	Postojna
Gorenje	Šmartno ob Paki
Gorenji Globodol	Mirna Peč
Gorenji Lazi	Ribnica
Gorenji Leskovec	Krško
Gorenji Log	Tolmin
Gorenji Maharovec	Šentjernej
Gorenji Mokronog	Trebnje
Gorenji Novaki	Cerkno
Gorenji Podboršt pri Veliki Loki	Trebnje
Gorenji Podboršt	Mirna Peč
Gorenji Podšumberk	Trebnje
Gorenji Potok	Kostel
Gorenji Radenci	Črnomelj
Gorenji Suhadol	Novo Mesto
Gorenji Vrh pri Dobrniču	Trebnje
Gorenji Vrsnik	Idrija
Gorenjski Vrh	Zavrč
Gorica pri Dobjem	Dobje
Gorica pri Oplotnici	Oplotnica
Gorica pri Raztezu	Krško
Gorica pri Slivnici	Šentjur
Gorica pri Šmartnem	Celje
Gorica	Črnomelj
Gorica	Krško
Gorica	Moravče
Gorica	Puconci
Gorica	Radovljica
Goriča vas	Ribnica
Goričak	Zavrč
Goričane	Medvode
Goriče pri Famljah	Divača
Goriče	Kranj
Goriče	Postojna
Goričica pod Krimom	Brezovica
Goričica pri Ihanu	Domžale
Goričica pri Moravčah	Moravče
Goričica	Šentjur
Goričice	Cerknica
Goriška Gora	Škocjan
Goriška vas pri Škocjanu	Škocjan
Goriška vas	Mirna Peč
Goriški Vrh	Dravograd
Gorišnica	Gorišnica
Gorjane	Kozje
Gorjansko	Komen
Gorje	Cerkno
Gorjuša	Domžale
Gorjuše	Bohinj
Gornja Bistrica	Črenšovci
Gornja Bitnja	Ilirska Bistrica
Gornja Briga	Kočevje
Gornja Košana	Pivka
Gornja Lokvica	Metlika
Gornja Paka	Črnomelj
Gornja Prekopa	Krško
Gornja Radgona	Gornja Radgona
Gornja Stara vas	Škocjan
Gornja Težka Voda	Novo Mesto
Gornja vas	Šmarje pri Jelšah
Gornja vas	Zreče
Gornje Brezovo	Sevnica
Gornje Cerovo	Brda
Gornje Dobravice	Metlika
Gornje Impolje	Sevnica
Gornje Laze	Semič
Gornje Ležeče	Divača
Gornje Ložine	Kočevje
Gornje Orle	Sevnica
Gornje Pijavško	Krško
Gornje Prapreče	Trebnje
Gornje Ravne	Litija
Gornje Retje	Velike Lašče
Gornje Vreme	Divača
Gornji Ajdovec	Žužemberk
Gornji Črnci	Cankova
Gornji Dolič	Mislinja
Gornji Grad	Gornji Grad
Gornji Ig	Ig
Gornji Ivanjci	Gornja Radgona
Gornji Ključarovci	Ormož
Gornji Kot	Žužemberk
Gornji Križ	Žužemberk
Gornji Lakoš	Lendava
Gornji Lenart	Brežice
Gornji Petrovci	Gornji Petrovci
Gornji Rogatec	Grosuplje
Gornji Slaveči	Kuzma
Gornji Suhor pri Metliki	Metlika
Gornji Suhor pri Vinici	Črnomelj
Gornji Vrh	Litija
Gornji Zemon	Ilirska Bistrica
Goropeke	Žiri
Gorski Vrh	Tolmin
Gortina	Muta
Gosteče	Škofja Loka
Gostinca	Podčetrtek
Gotenc	Kostel
Gotenica	Kočevje
Gotovlje	Žalec
Govce	Laško
Goveji Dol	Sevnica
Govejk	Idrija
Gozd Martuljek	Kranjska Gora
Gozd	Ajdovščina
Gozd	Kamnik
Gozd	Tržič
Gozdec	Laško
Gozd-Reka	Litija
Grabče	Bled
Grabe pri Ljutomeru	Križevci
Grabe	Gornja Radgona
Grabe	Ormož
Graben	Ribnica
Grabonoš	Sveti Jurij ob Ščavnici
Grabonoški Vrh	Cerkvenjak
Grabrovec	Metlika
Grabšinci	Sveti Jurij ob Ščavnici
Gračič	Zreče
Gračišče	Koper
Gračnica	Laško
Grad	Cerklje na Gorenjskem
Grad	Grad
Gradac	Metlika
Gradec	Krško
Gradec	Pivka
Gradenc	Žužemberk
Gradenje	Novo Mesto
Gradenšak	Lenart
Gradež	Velike Lašče
Gradiček	Ivančna Gorica
Gradin	Koper
Gradišča	Gorišnica
Gradiščak	Juršinci
Gradišče na Kozjaku	Selnica ob Dravi
Gradišče nad Pijavo Gorico	Škofljica
Gradišče nad Prvačino	Nova Gorica
Gradišče pri Divači	Divača
Gradišče pri Litiji	Litija
Gradišče pri Lukovici	Lukovica
Gradišče pri Materiji	Hrpelje-Kozina
Gradišče pri Ormožu	Ormož
Gradišče pri Raki	Krško
Gradišče pri Štjaku	Sežana
Gradišče pri Trebnjem	Trebnje
Gradišče pri Vipavi	Vipava
Gradišče pri Vojniku	Vojnik
Gradišče v Tuhinju	Kamnik
Gradišče	Grosuplje
Gradišče	Kozje
Gradišče	Slovenj Gradec
Gradišče	Tišina (občina)
Gradišče	Velike Lašče
Gradišče	Videm
Gradišče-K. O. Grad. In Polj.	Litija
Gradišče-K. O. Št. Lovrenc	Litija
Gradišica	Hrpelje-Kozina
Gradiška	Kungota
Gradiške Laze	Litija
Gradiški Dol	Rogaška Slatina
Gradiško	Bloke
Gradnik	Semič
Gradnje	Krško
Gradnje	Sežana
Gradno	Brda
Grahovo Brdo	Sežana
Grahovo ob Bači	Tolmin
Grahovo	Cerknica
Grahovše	Tržič
Grajena	Ptuj
Grajenščak	Ptuj
Grajska vas	Braslovče
Grant	Tolmin
Graška Gora	Slovenj Gradec
Grč Vrh	Mirna Peč
Grčarevec	Logatec
Grčarice	Ribnica
Grčarske Ravne	Ribnica
Grdina	Majšperk
Grebenje	Ribnica
Gregovce	Brežice
Grenc	Škofja Loka
Gresovščak	Ljutomer
Grgar	Nova Gorica
Grgarske Ravne	Nova Gorica
Grgelj	Kostel
Griblje	Črnomelj
Grič pri Dobličah	Črnomelj
Grič pri Klevevžu	Novo Mesto
Grič pri Trebnjem	Trebnje
Grič	Krško
Grič	Ribnica
Grinjan	Koper
Grintovec pri Osilnici	Osilnica
Grintovec	Ivančna Gorica
Grintovec	Koper
Grivac	Kostel
Grivče	Ajdovščina
Griže	Ivančna Gorica
Griže	Sežana
Griže	Žalec
Grlava	Ljutomer
Grliče	Šmarje pri Jelšah
Grlinci	Juršinci
Grm pri Podzemlju	Metlika
Grm	Ivančna Gorica
Grm	Trebnje
Grm	Velike Lašče
Grmada	Trebnje
Grmovlje	Škocjan
Grobelce	Šmarje pri Jelšah
Grobelno - del	Šentjur
Grobelno - del	Šmarje pri Jelšah
Grobišče	Postojna
Groblje pri Prekopi	Šentjernej
Grosuplje	Grosuplje
Gruča	Šentjernej
Grudnica	Tolmin
Grušce	Šentjur
Grušena	Kungota
Gruškovec	Gorišnica
Grušova	Maribor
Grušovlje	Mozirje
Gržeča vas	Krško
Gubno	Kozje
Gumberk	Novo Mesto
Gumnišče	Škofljica
Gunclje	Ljubljana
Gunte	Krško
