= List of cities, towns, and villages in Slovenia: J =

This is a list of cities, towns, and villages in Slovenia, starting with J.

| Settlement | Municipality |
|---|---|
| Jablan | Mirna Peč |
| Jablana | Zagorje ob Savi |
| Jablance | Duplek |
| Jablance | Krško |
| Jablanica | Ilirska Bistrica |
| Jablanica | Sevnica |
| Jablaniške Laze | Litija |
| Jablaniški Potok | Litija |
| Jablovec | Podlehnik |
| Jagnjenica | Radeče |
| Jagoče | Laško |
| Jagodje | Izola |
| Jagršče | Cerkno |
| Jakičevo | Velike Lašče |
| Jakob pri Šentjurju | Šentjur |
| Jakovce | Sežana |
| Jakovica | Logatec |
| Jakšiči | Kostel |
| Jama pri Dvoru | Žužemberk |
| Jama | Kranj |
| Jama | Novo Mesto |
| Jamna | Sveti Jurij ob Ščavnici |
| Jamnica | Prevalje |
| Jamnik | Kranj |
| Janče | Ljubljana |
| Janeževo Brdo | Ilirska Bistrica |
| Janeži | Sodražica |
| Janežovci | Destrnik |
| Janežovski Vrh | Destrnik |
| Janhova | Gornja Radgona |
| Jankova | Vojnik |
| Jankoviči | Črnomelj |
| Janški Vrh | Majšperk |
| Janškovo Selo | Velenje |
| Janžev Vrh | Radenci |
| Janževa Gora | Selnica ob Dravi |
| Janževski Vrh | Podvelka |
| Jarčja Dolina | Žiri |
| Jarčje Brdo | Gorenja Vas–Poljane |
| Jarčji Vrh | Škocjan |
| Jareninski Dol | Pesnica |
| Jareninski Vrh | Pesnica |
| Jarmovec | Šentjur |
| Jarše | Zagorje ob Savi |
| Jasen | Domžale |
| Jasen | Ilirska Bistrica |
| Jastrebci | Ormož |
| Jastrebnik | Litija |
| Javnik | Podvelka |
| Javor | Ljubljana |
| Javorje pri Blagovici | Lukovica |
| Javorje pri Gabrovki | Litija |
| Javorje | Črna na Koroškem |
| Javorje | Gorenja Vas–Poljane |
| Javorje | Hrpelje-Kozina |
| Javorje | Litija |
| Javorje | Šentjur |
| Javorje | Velike Lašče |
| Javorjev Dol | Gorenja Vas–Poljane |
| Javornik | Idrija |
| Javornik | Kranj |
| Javornik | Štore |
| Javorniški Rovt | Jesenice |
| Javorovica | Šentjernej |
| Jazbin Vrh | Šentjur |
| Jazbina | Črna na Koroškem |
| Jazbina | Šmarje pri Jelšah |
| Jazbine | Gorenja Vas–Poljane |
| Jazbine | Šentjur |
| Jazne | Cerkno |
| Jedlovnik | Kungota |
| Jelarji | Koper |
| Jelce | Šentjur |
| Jelenče | Pesnica |
| Jelendol | Ribnica |
| Jelendol | Škocjan |
| Jelendol | Tržič |
| Jelenik | Krško |
| Jelenja Vas | Kočevje |
| Jelenk | Zagorje ob Savi |
| Jelenov Žleb | Ribnica |
| Jelenska Reber | Litija |
| Jelični Vrh | Idrija |
| Jelovec pri Makolah | Slovenska Bistrica |
| Jelovec | Maribor |
| Jelovec | Sevnica |
| Jelovec | Sodražica |
| Jelovica | Gorenja Vas–Poljane |
| Jelovice | Majšperk |
| Jelovo | Radeče |
| Jelša | Litija |
| Jelša | Lukovica |
| Jelšane | Ilirska Bistrica |
| Jelše pri Otočcu | Novo Mesto |
| Jelše | Krško |
| Jelše | Mirna Peč |
| Jelševec | Krško |
| Jelševec | Trebnje |
| Jelševica | Zagorje ob Savi |
| Jelševnik | Črnomelj |
| Jeperjek | Sevnica |
| Jeranovo | Kamnik |
| Jerčin | Podčetrtek |
| Jereka | Bohinj |
| Jereslavec | Brežice |
| Jerman Vrh | Škocjan |
| Jerneja Vas | Črnomelj |
| Jeronim | Vransko |
| Jerovska Vas | Šmarje pri Jelšah |
| Jeršanovo | Bloke |
| Jeršiče | Cerknica |
| Jeruzalem | Ljutomer |
| Jesenica | Cerkno |
| Jesenice | Brežice |
| Jesenice | Jesenice |
| Jesenje | Litija |
| Jesenov Vrt | Kostel |
| Jesenovo | Zagorje ob Savi |
| Ješenca | Rače-Fram |
| Ješovec pri Kozjem | Kozje |
| Ješovec pri Šmarju | Šmarje pri Jelšah |
| Ješovec | Slovenska Bistrica |
| Jevnica | Litija |
| Jevšček | Kobarid |
| Jezerca | Kobarid |
| Jezerce pri Dobjem | Dobje |
| Jezerce pri Šmartnem | Celje |
| Jezero | Brezovica |
| Jezero | Trebnje |
| Ježce | Litija |
| Ježevec | Litija |
| Ježni Vrh | Litija |
| Jiršovci | Destrnik |
| Jordankal | Mirna Peč |
| Josipdol | Ribnica na Pohorju |
| Jugorje pri Metliki | Metlika |
| Jugorje | Novo Mesto |
| Junčje | Ribnica |
| Jurišče | Pivka |
| Jurišna Vas | Slovenska Bistrica |
| Jurjevica | Ribnica |
| Jurjevski Dol | Šentilj |
| Jurka Vas | Novo Mesto |
| Jurklošter | Laško |
| Jurna Vas | Novo Mesto |
| Jurovci | Videm |
| Jurovski Dol | Lenart |
| Jurski Vrh | Kungota |
| Juršinci | Juršinci |
| Juvanje | Ljubno |
