= Jelsa =

Jelsa may refer to:

== Places ==
=== Croatia ===
- Jelsa, Croatia, a municipality on the island of Hvar, Croatia

=== Norway ===
- Jelsa, Norway, a village in Suldal municipality, Rogaland county
- Jelsa Municipality, a former municipality in Rogaland county (now part of Suldal municipality)
- Jelsa Church, a church in Suldal municipality, Rogaland county

=== Slovenia ===
- Jelša, Lukovica, a village in the Municipality of Lukovica, central Slovenia
- Jelša, Šmartno pri Litiji, a village in the Municipality of Šmartno pri Litiji, central Slovenia

== See also ==
- Jelše (disambiguation)
