= Griže =

Griže is the name of several places in Slovenia:

- Griže, Ivančna Gorica
- Griže, Sežana
- Griže, Žalec
