= Grč Vrh =

- Location in Slovenia
- Coordinates: 45°50′19.78″N 15°3′32.68″E
- Country: Slovenia
- Traditional region: Lower Carniola
- Statistical region: Southeast Slovenia
- Municipality: Mirna Peč

Area
  - Total: 6.16 km^{2} (2.38 sq mi)
- Elevation: 364.5 m (1,196 ft)

Population (2002)
  - Total: 6

Grč Vrh (pronounced [ˈɡəɾtʃ ˈʋəɾx]) is a dispersed settlement south of Golobinjek in the Municipality of Mirna Peč in southeastern Slovenia. The area is part of the historical region of Lower Carniola and is now included in the Southeast Slovenia Statistical Region.

== Mass grave ==
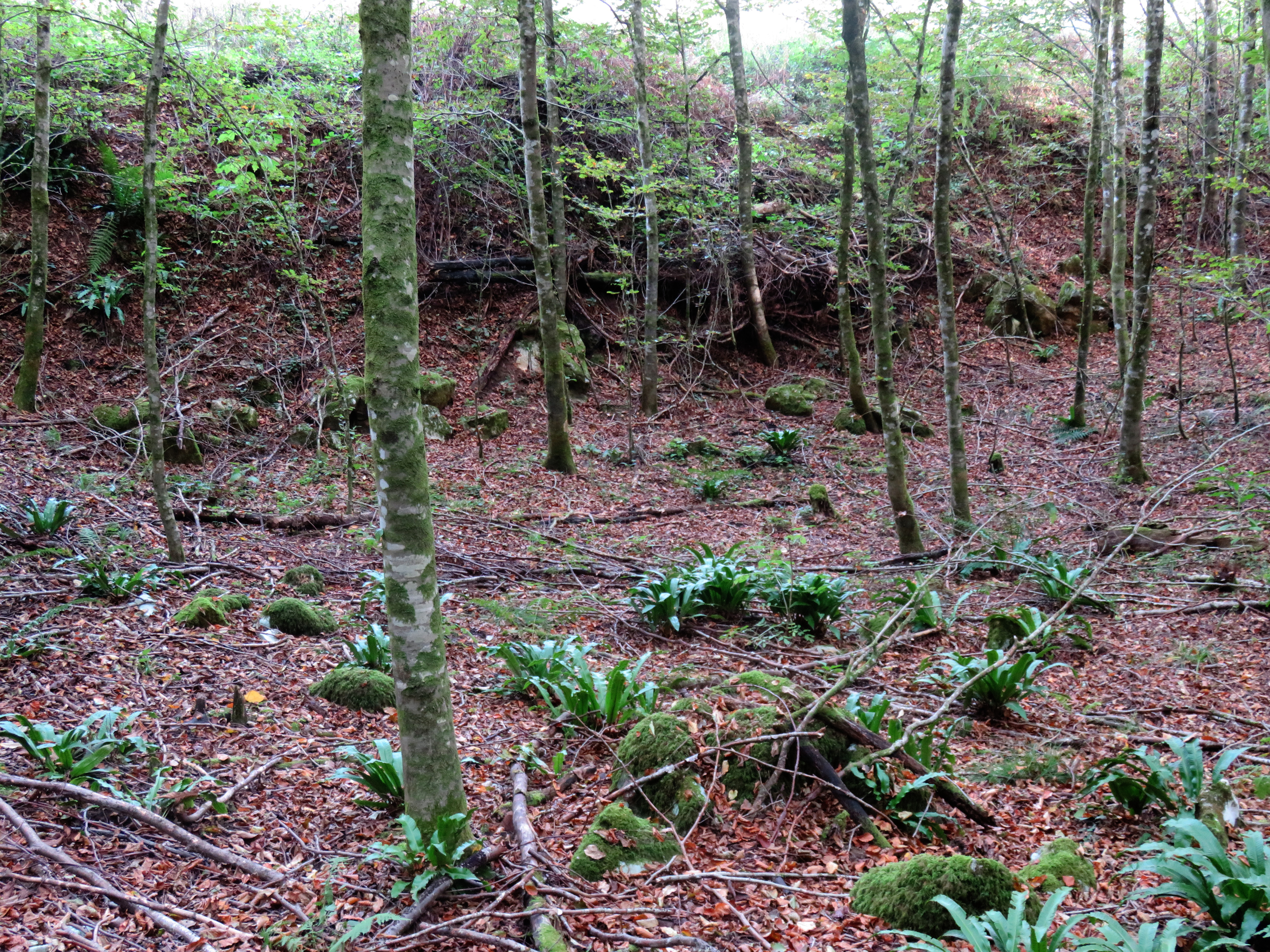
The Bear Cave Mass Grave

Grč Vrh is the site of a mass grave associated with the Second World War. The Bear Cave Mass Grave (Slovene: Grobišče Medvedova jama) is located south of the settlement, on the north slope of Pogorelec Hill, along the road from Brezova Reber pri Dvoru to Prečna. It contains the remains of undetermined victims based on human bones found by spelunkers at the site.
