= Biška Vas =

- Location in Slovenia
- Coordinates: 45°52′6.64″N 15°4′39.57″E
- Country: Slovenia
- Traditional region: Lower Carniola
- Statistical region: Southeast Slovenia
- Municipality: Mirna Peč

Area
  - Total: 1.62 km^{2} (0.63 sq mi)
- Elevation: 253.9 m (833 ft)

Population (2002)
  - Total: 119

Biška Vas (pronounced [ˈbiːʃka ˈʋaːs]) is a village in the Municipality of Mirna Peč in southeastern Slovenia. It lies on the Temenica River north of Mirna Peč. The area is part of the traditional region of Lower Carniola. The municipality is now included in the Southeast Slovenia Statistical Region.

== Name ==
Biška Vas was attested in historical sources as Visezdorf in 1343, Vilessendorf in 1351, Swysitschdorff in 1420, and Wissestorff in 1433, among other spellings.
