= Orkljevec =

- Location in Slovenia
- Coordinates: 45°51′40.93″N 15°6′51.67″E
- Country: Slovenia
- Traditional region: Lower Carniola
- Statistical region: Southeast Slovenia
- Municipality: Mirna Peč

Area
  - Total: 0.29 km^{2} (0.11 sq mi)
- Elevation: 315.2 m (1,034 ft)

Population (2002)
  - Total: 52

Orkljevec (pronounced [ˈoːɾkljɛʋəts]) is a small settlement in the hills east of Mirna Peč in southeastern Slovenia. The area is part of the historical region of Lower Carniola. The Municipality of Mirna Peč is now included in the Southeast Slovenia Statistical Region.
