= Gabrska Gora =

Gabrska Gora may refer to

- Gabrska Gora, Litija, a settlement in the Municipality of Litija in central Slovenia
- Gabrška Gora, a settlement in the Municipality of Škofja Loka in the Upper Carniola region of Slovenia
