= Gabrk =

Gabrk is a Slovene place name that may refer to:

- Gabrk, Ilirska Bistrica, a settlement in the Municipality of Ilirska Bistrica, southwestern Slovenia
- Gabrk, Škofja Loka, a settlement in the Municipality of Škofja Loka, northwestern Slovenia
