= Gradež =

Gradež may refer to

- the Slovene name for Grado, Italy, a town in the north-eastern Italian region of Friuli-Venezia Giulia
- Gradež, Velike Lašče, a settlement in the Velike Lašče municipality in Slovenia
