= Jelše =

Jelše may refer to several settlements in Slovenia:

- Jelša, Šmartno pri Litiji, a settlement in the Municipality of Šmartno pri Litiji (known as Jelše until 1990)
- Jelše, Krško, a settlement in the Municipality of Krško
- Jelše, Mirna Peč, a settlement in the Municipality of Mirna Peč
- Jelše pri Otočcu, a settlement in the Municipality of Novo Mesto
