= Male Dole pri Temenici =

Male Dole pri Temenici Male Dole pri Šentjurju (until 1997)
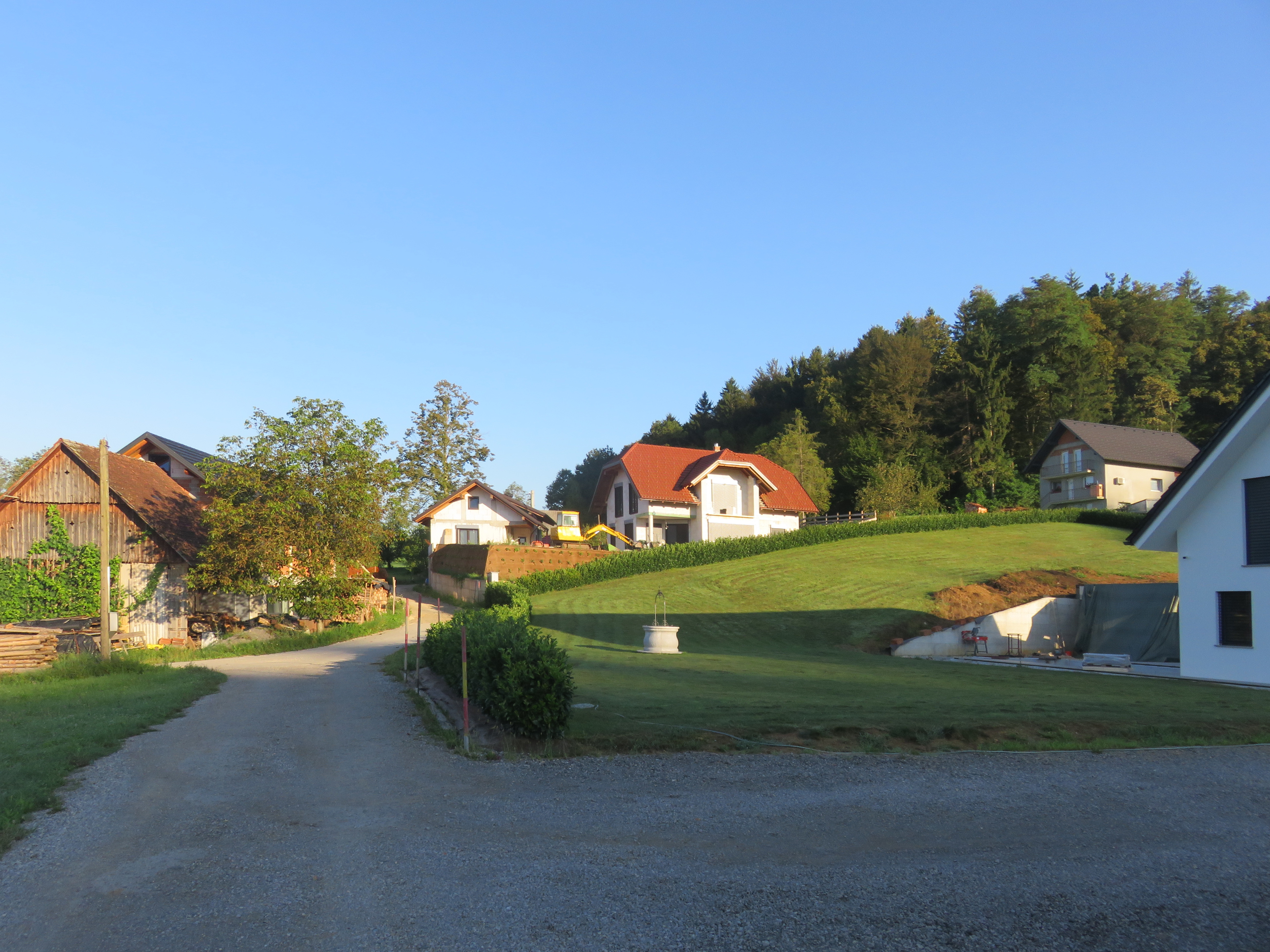

- Location in Slovenia
- Coordinates: 45°57′31.8″N 14°54′0.5″E
- Country: Slovenia
- Traditional region: Lower Carniola
- Statistical region: Central Slovenia
- Municipality: Ivančna Gorica

Area
  - Total: 1.35 km^{2} (0.52 sq mi)
- Elevation: 324.6 m (1,065 ft)

Population (2002)
  - Total: 29

Male Dole pri Temenici (pronounced [ˈmaːlɛ ˈdoːlɛ pɾi ˈteːmɛnitsi]; German: Kleindule) is a small settlement in the upper valley of the Temenica River in the Municipality of Ivančna Gorica in central Slovenia. The area is part of the traditional region of Lower Carniola and is now included in the Central Slovenia Statistical Region.

== Name ==
The village was formerly called Male Dole pri Šentjurju and was renamed Male Dole pri Temenici in 1997.
