= Municipality of Mirna Peč =

Municipality of Slovenia

Municipality of Mirna Peč Občina Mirna Peč
- Municipality
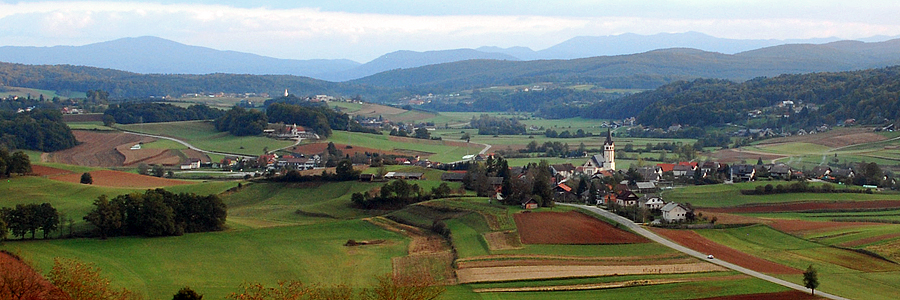
- The Mirna Peč Valley

- Coat of arms

- Location of the Municipality of Mirna Peč in Slovenia
- Coordinates: 45°51′29″N 15°05′15″E
- Country: Slovenia

Government
  - Mayor: Andrej Kastelic (Independent)

Area
  - Total: 48.0 km^{2} (18.5 sq mi)

Population (2002)
  - Total: 2,702
  - Density: 56.3/km^{2} (146/sq mi)
- Time zone: UTC+01 (CET)
  - Summer (DST): UTC+02 (CEST)
- Website: www.mirnapec.si

The Municipality of Mirna Peč (pronounced [ˈmiːɾna ˈpeːtʃ]; Slovene: Občina Mirna Peč) is a municipality in southeast Slovenia, located in the traditional region of Lower Carniola. The seat of the municipality, which was established in 1998, is Mirna Peč. With an estimated population of 2,800, the municipality is included in the Southeast Slovenia Statistical Region.

== Geography ==
The municipality lies at the junction of the Dinaric Alps, the Pannonian Basin, and the Alps, making shallow carbonate bedrocks, in particular limestone, the prevailing substratum. The predominantly hilly landscape with frequent karst features consists of three valleys: the Igmanca Valley, the Temenica Valley, and the Globodol Polje.

=== The Igmanca Valley ===
The Igmanca Valley northeast of Mirna Peč is bounded by Šentjurij Peak (Slovene: Šentjurijski vrh) to the south, Snakaš Hill to the west, and the Poljane Mountains (Slovene: Poljanska gora, with the highest peak at 477 m) and Plešivica Hill to the northeast. Although white or gray Jurassic limestone is most common, the northeast slope is covered with brown marl and red limestone from the Cretaceous period. There are five karst caves on its slopes, the largest one being Giant's House Cave (Slovene: Ajdovska hiša) on Plešivica Hill.

The valley, with an elevation of about 260 m, contains a shallow aquifer with a limited groundwater supply. Igmanca Creek, also known as Poljane Creek (Slovene: Poljanski potok), surfaces and disappears underground twice along the valley. Karst features such as small swallow holes, estavelles, and, to a lesser extent, an outcrop of carbonate rock are also present.

=== The Temenica Valley ===
South of Saint Anne Hill (Slovene: Sveta Ana), the Temenica River surfaces below a 35 m cliff at Zijalo. The initially narrow river valley gradually stretches into the undulating terraced countryside east of Golobinjek Hill. The river meanders through the floodplain at Mirna Peč and disappears beneath the surface in the swallow holes at Goriška Vas. Due to seasonal flooding in spring and autumn, fertile alluvial soil along the river bank is spread across the valley. Loam and clay deposits cover the surrounding hillsides.

The Temenica River is preserved as an ecological important area due to its unique and characteristic natural features, including varied riverside biodiversity, and the network of karst springs at Zijalo is listed as a site of local importance and a special conservation area.

=== The Globodol Polje ===
Globodol is a dry polje surrounded by an 80 to 120 m higher oval ridge to the north and the Ajdovec Plateau to the south, Koprivnica Hill to the west and Golobinjek Hill to the east. Its bottom at an elevation of 200 m is 4 km long and 1 km wide, covered mostly with red clay and rendzina. At its eastern and western edges are deep dolines, through which at water rises during flooding and later sinks. Caves on the slopes of surrounding hillsides give evidence of an ancient outflow; however, at present water supply is limited to groundwater aquifers.

Due to varied species of wild fauna and flora as well as natural habitat types, Koprivnica Hill, the Ajdovec Plateau, and Sluga Cave (Slovene: Slugova jama) are listed as areas protected under the Natura 2000 Act.

=== Settlements ===
In addition to the municipal seat of Mirna Peč, the municipality also includes the following settlements:

- Biška Vas
- Čemše
- Dolenja Vas pri Mirni Peči
- Dolenji Globodol
- Dolenji Podboršt
- Globočdol
- Golobinjek
- Gorenji Globodol
- Gorenji Podboršt
- Goriška Vas
- Grč Vrh
- Hmeljčič
- Hrastje pri Mirni Peči
- Jablan
- Jelše
- Jordankal
- Malenska Vas
- Mali Kal
- Mali Vrh
- Orkljevec
- Poljane pri Mirni Peči
- Selo pri Zagorici
- Šentjurij na Dolenjskem
- Srednji Globodol
- Veliki Kal
- Vrhovo pri Mirni Peči
- Vrhpeč
