= Lojze Slak =

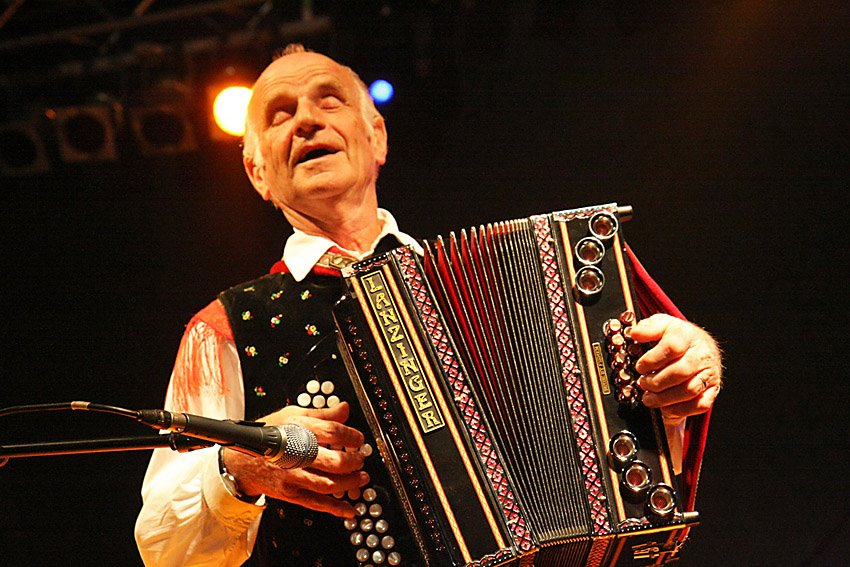
Lojze Slak

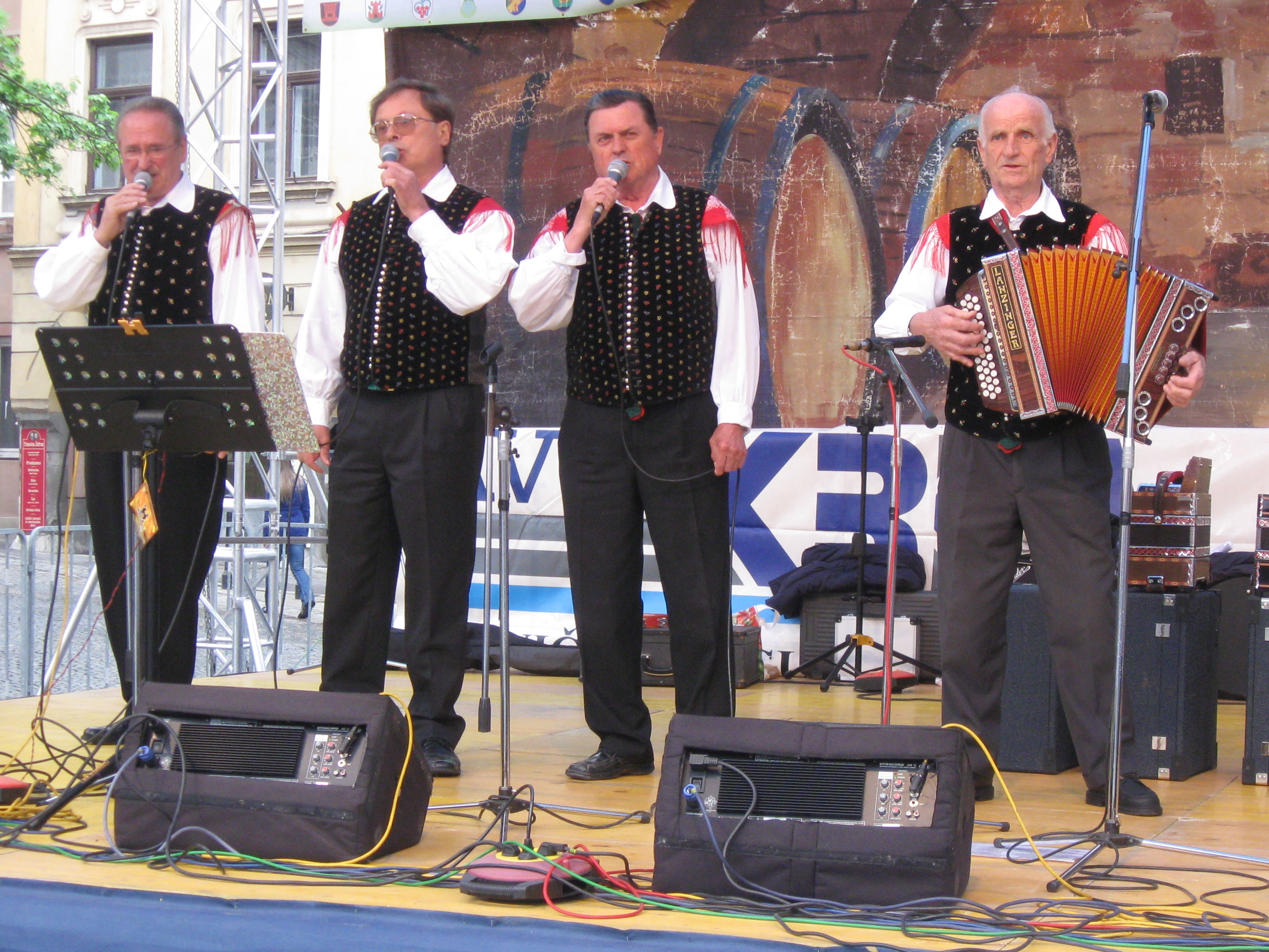
Fantje s Praprotna and Lojze Slak

Lojze Slak (23 July 1932 – 29 September 2011) was a Slovenian musician. Slak was one of the pioneers of Slovene popular folk music, based on diatonic button accordion and author of several evergreen songs, performed by his Lojze Slak Ensemble (Slovene: Ansambel Lojzeta Slaka).

== Early life and career ==
Slak was born in Jordankal near Mirna Peč. He first learned how to play the diatonic button accordion from his uncle Ludvik and mastered several songs before he entered primary school. By the time he was 15, Slak was already playing at wedding parties. He continued playing for more than ten years, gaining proficiency. The turning point in his career came in 1957, when he competed in a radio talent show "Pokaži kaj znaš". Two years later Slak formed a quartet with his three brothers, playing a trumpet, a clarinet, a bass and the accordion by Lojze.

== Lojze Slak Ensemble ==
In 1964, Slak met the group Fantje s Praprotna and together they formed the Lojze Slak Ensemble. The group was active for almost 50 years, creating several evergreen songs, including Čez Gorjance (1965), V dolini tihi je vasica mala (1966), Po dekle (1967) and Mama, prihajam domov (1985). Overall, Slak created more than 500 songs and created a branch of music with several hundreds of followers in Slovenia and abroad.

In 2005, Lojze Slak created an arrangement of a song by a rock group Big Foot Mama, creating a combination of popular folk and rock music, gaining praise from the audiences. Both groups performed the song together at several concerts, including at rock festivals.

In addition to writing music, Slak, a virtuoso on diatonic button accordion, developed several improvements for the instrument, adding extra buttons. He was also a promoter of cviček wine, and had his own vineyard.

Slak died in 2011 in Ljubljana after fighting bone cancer. He was buried in Šentvid. On 20 October 2018, the Museum of Lojze Slak and Tone Pavček opened in Mirna Peč, where, as part of the first phase, a permanent exhibition on Slaka's life and musical journey is on display, with his entire music collection, artefacts and original accordions. May 2019, the museum had already been visited by more than 7,000 fans of Slak's music.
