= Malenska Vas =

- Location in Slovenia
- Coordinates: 45°50′54.37″N 15°5′20.26″E
- Country: Slovenia
- Traditional region: Lower Carniola
- Statistical region: Southeast Slovenia
- Municipality: Mirna Peč

Area
  - Total: 0.53 km^{2} (0.20 sq mi)
- Elevation: 236.6 m (776 ft)

Population (2002)
  - Total: 72

Malenska Vas (pronounced [ˈmaːlɛnska ˈʋaːs]) is a settlement south of Mirna Peč in southeastern Slovenia. The area is part of the historical region of Lower Carniola. The Municipality of Mirna Peč is now included in the Southeast Slovenia Statistical Region.
