= Srednji Globodol =

- Location in Slovenia
- Coordinates: 45°50′41.18″N 15°2′46.35″E
- Country: Slovenia
- Traditional region: Lower Carniola
- Statistical region: Southeast Slovenia
- Municipality: Mirna Peč

Area
  - Total: 0.41 km^{2} (0.16 sq mi)
- Elevation: 204.5 m (671 ft)

Population (2002)
  - Total: 54

Srednji Globodol (pronounced [ˈsɾeːdnji ɡlɔbɔˈdoːu̯], German: Mittertiefenthal) is a small settlement in the Municipality of Mirna Peč in southeastern Slovenia. The area is part of the historical region of Lower Carniola. The municipality is now included in the Southeast Slovenia Statistical Region.

Evidence of an early Roman period burial ground has been discovered near the settlement.
