= Gorenji Globodol =

- Location in Slovenia
- Coordinates: 45°51′10.34″N 15°2′32.94″E
- Country: Slovenia
- Traditional region: Lower Carniola
- Statistical region: Southeast Slovenia
- Municipality: Mirna Peč

Area
  - Total: 3.21 km^{2} (1.24 sq mi)
- Elevation: 203.4 m (667 ft)

Population (2002)
  - Total: 88

Gorenji Globodol (pronounced [ɡɔˈɾeːnji ˈɡloːbɔdɔu̯], German: Obertiefenthal) is a settlement in the Municipality of Mirna Peč in southeastern Slovenia. The village preserves its traditional single-storey housing lining the main street with outbuildings and long strips of cultivated land behind each house. The area is part of the historical region of Lower Carniola. The municipality is now included in the Southeast Slovenia Statistical Region.
