= Gorenje Kamenje =

- Location in Slovenia
- Coordinates: 45°51′17.12″N 15°9′10.23″E
- Country: Slovenia
- Traditional region: Lower Carniola
- Statistical region: Southeast Slovenia
- Municipality: Novo Mesto

Area
  - Total: 1.847 km^{2} (0.713 sq mi)
- Elevation: 386.6 m (1,268 ft)

Population (2026)
  - Total: 121
  - Density: 66/km^{2} (170/sq mi)
- Postal code: 8000

Gorenje Kamenje (pronounced [ɡɔˈɾeːnjɛ ˈkaːmɛnjɛ], in older sources Gorenje Kamnje, German: Obersteinberg) is a settlement in the hills north of the town of Novo Mesto in southeastern Slovenia. The entire City Municipality of Novo Mesto is part of the traditional region of Lower Carniola and is now included in the Southeast Slovenia Statistical Region. In January 2026, the population was 121.

== Landmarks ==
=== Church ===
The local church is dedicated to the Holy Spirit and belongs to the Parish of Mirna Peč. It is a medieval building with an 18th-century extension and belfry.

=== Hopfenbach Castle ===
Hopfenbach Castle (Slovene: grad Hmeljnik), a hilltop castle, stands west of the settlement, on a hill overlooking the A2 motorway.

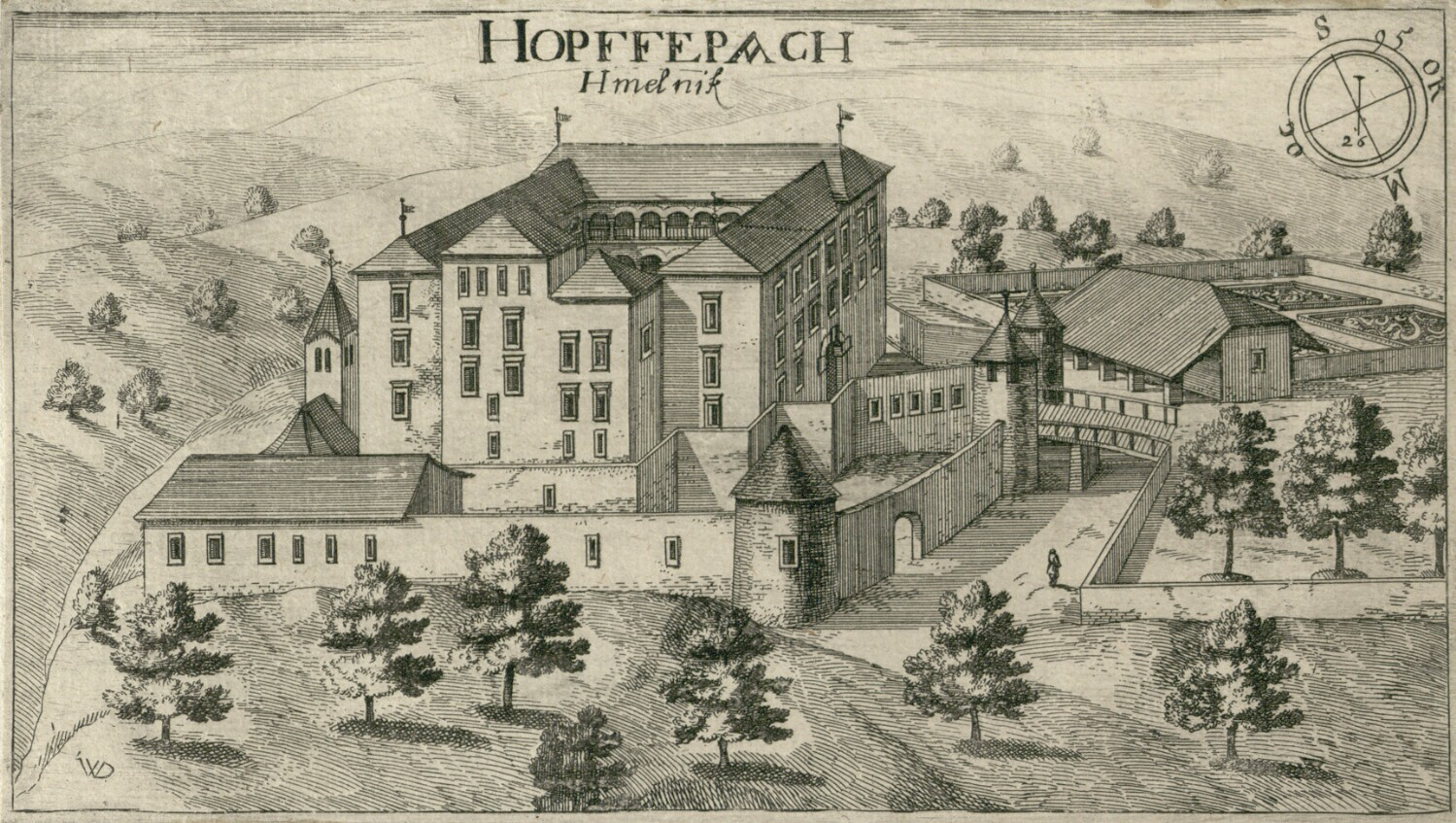
Hopfenbach Castle in the 17th century

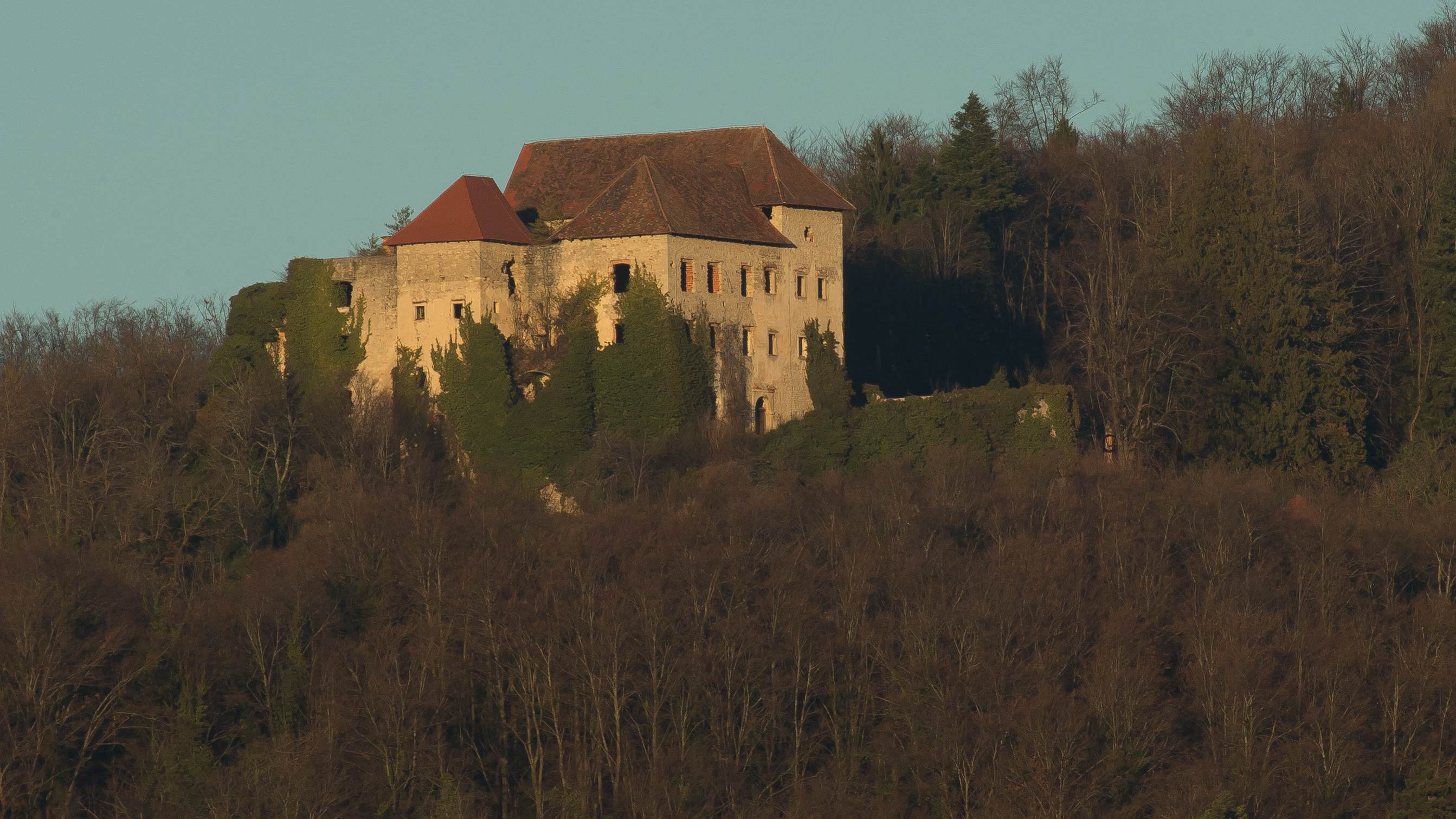
Hopfenbach Castle in 2020

The original owners of the castle, the noble Hopfenbachs, died out in the 14th century. Subsequently the castle was owned by the Carniolan comital families Auersperg, Gallenfells, and Paradaiser, and the baronial families Tschernembl and Jankovič. The Romanesque square keep was first expanded with the addition of Gothic perimeter towers and the eastern wing. During the Habsburg–Ottoman wars the entire complex was surrounded with a defensive wall, reinforced with round towers. During the Renaissance, arcaded hallways were added to the inner courtyard and outbuildings were constructed in the lower courtyard. The final result was an extensive defensive complex, with two concentric defensive walls closing off the access to the main building, perched on the raised ridge. A walled garden was laid out east of the complex, separated from the main gate by a dry moat.

In 1876 the castle, by then in a dilapidated state, was bought by Baron Franz Wambolt von Umstadt of Essen. The Wambolt family carried out a thorough restoration, maintaining the Renaissance architectural elements and uncovering older Gothic and Romanesque elements covered or altered by previous adaptations. Before the Second World War, the castle served as perhaps the best example of extant secular medieval architecture in Carniola.

In 1942 the castle was ransacked by the Slovene Partisans and locals, and partially burned. The abandoned castle was subsequently bombed in an RAF raid. After the war, it was shelled and partially dynamited. State sponsored restoration works began in the late 1950s, but soon stalled. The remains have been deteriorating ever since. Most of the interesting architectural elements, including the renaissance arcaded hallways of the inner courtyard, have since disappeared.
