= Vrhpeč =

- Location in Slovenia
- Coordinates: 45°52′37.12″N 15°3′41.64″E
- Country: Slovenia
- Traditional region: Lower Carniola
- Statistical region: Southeast Slovenia
- Municipality: Mirna Peč

Area
  - Total: 1.01 km^{2} (0.39 sq mi)
- Elevation: 303 m (994 ft)

Population (2002)
  - Total: 67

Vrhpeč (pronounced [ˈʋəɾxpɛtʃ]) is a settlement in the Municipality of Mirna Peč in southeastern Slovenia. The area is part of the historical region of Lower Carniola. The municipality is now included in the Southeast Slovenia Statistical Region.

The local church is built on a hill north of the settlement on which evidence of a prehistoric Iron Age hillfort has been found. It is dedicated to Saint Anne and belongs to the Parish of Trebnje. It was first mentioned in written documents dating to 1526 and was restyled in the Baroque in the 18th century.
