= Jordankal =

- Location in Slovenia
- Coordinates: 45°52′11.24″N 15°2′30.2″E
- Country: Slovenia
- Traditional region: Lower Carniola
- Statistical region: Southeast Slovenia
- Municipality: Mirna Peč

Area
  - Total: 1.62 km^{2} (0.63 sq mi)
- Elevation: 308.4 m (1,012 ft)

Population (2002)
  - Total: 38

Jordankal (pronounced [ˈjoːɾdaŋkau̯] or [jɔɾˈdaːŋkau̯]) is a settlement west of Mirna Peč in Lower Carniola in southeastern Slovenia. The entire Municipality of Mirna Peč is included in the Southeast Slovenia Statistical Region.
