= Poljane pri Mirni Peči =

- Location in Slovenia
- Coordinates: 45°53′34.07″N 15°5′15.41″E
- Country: Slovenia
- Traditional region: Lower Carniola
- Statistical region: Southeast Slovenia
- Municipality: Mirna Peč

Area
  - Total: 1.75 km^{2} (0.68 sq mi)
- Elevation: 327.1 m (1,073 ft)

Population (2002)
  - Total: 52

Poljane pri Mirni Peči (pronounced [pɔˈljàːnɛ pɾi ˈmiːɾni ˈpɛːtʃi]) is a settlement in the Municipality of Mirna Peč in southeastern Slovenia. The area is part of the historical region of Lower Carniola. The municipality is now included in the Southeast Slovenia Statistical Region.

== Name ==
The name of the settlement was changed from Poljane to Poljane pri Mirni Peči in 1953.

== Cultural heritage ==
A roadside chapel-shrine on the eastern edge of the village dates to 1889.
