= Gaj, Šmarje pri Jelšah =

Gaj
- Location in Slovenia
- Coordinates: 46°13′22.02″N 15°33′8.46″E
- Country: Slovenia
- Traditional region: Styria
- Statistical region: Savinja
- Municipality: Šmarje pri Jelšah

Area
  - Total: 0.69 km^{2} (0.27 sq mi)
- Elevation: 235.3 m (772 ft)

Population (2002)
  - Total: 63

Gaj (pronounced [ˈɡaːi̯]) is a small settlement east of Šmarje pri Jelšah in eastern Slovenia. The area is part of the traditional region of Styria and is now included in the Savinja Statistical Region.
