= Mali Kal, Mirna Peč =

Mali Kal
- Location in Slovenia
- Coordinates: 45°51′49.99″N 15°7′8.84″E
- Country: Slovenia
- Traditional region: Lower Carniola
- Statistical region: Southeast Slovenia
- Municipality: Mirna Peč

Area
  - Total: 2.48 km^{2} (0.96 sq mi)
- Elevation: 289.1 m (948 ft)

Population (2002)
  - Total: 19

Mali Kal (pronounced [ˈmaːli ˈkaːu̯]) is a small settlement in the Municipality of Mirna Peč in southeastern Slovenia. The area is part of the traditional region of Lower Carniola and is now included in the Southeast Slovenia Statistical Region.
