= Selo pri Zagorici =

- Location in Slovenia
- Coordinates: 45°51′54.8″N 15°7′51.51″E
- Country: Slovenia
- Traditional region: Lower Carniola
- Statistical region: Southeast Slovenia
- Municipality: Mirna Peč

Area
  - Total: 0.31 km^{2} (0.12 sq mi)
- Elevation: 246.4 m (808 ft)

Population (2002)
  - Total: 42

Selo pri Zagorici (pronounced [ˈsɛːlɔ pɾi ˈzaːɡɔɾitsi]) is a small settlement in the Municipality of Mirna Peč in the Lower Carniola region in southeastern Slovenia. The municipality is part of the Southeast Slovenia Statistical Region.
