= Veliki Kal, Mirna Peč =

Veliki Kal
- Location in Slovenia
- Coordinates: 45°51′32.85″N 15°6′41.45″E
- Country: Slovenia
- Traditional region: Lower Carniola
- Statistical region: Southeast Slovenia
- Municipality: Mirna Peč

Area
  - Total: 2.03 km^{2} (0.78 sq mi)
- Elevation: 306.3 m (1,005 ft)

Population (2002)
  - Total: 72

Veliki Kal (pronounced [ˈʋeːliki ˈkaːu̯], German: Großkal) is a settlement in the Municipality of Mirna Peč in southeastern Slovenia. It lies in the hills east of Mirna Peč in the historical region of Lower Carniola. The municipality is now included in the Southeast Slovenia Statistical Region.
