= Hrastje pri Mirni Peči =

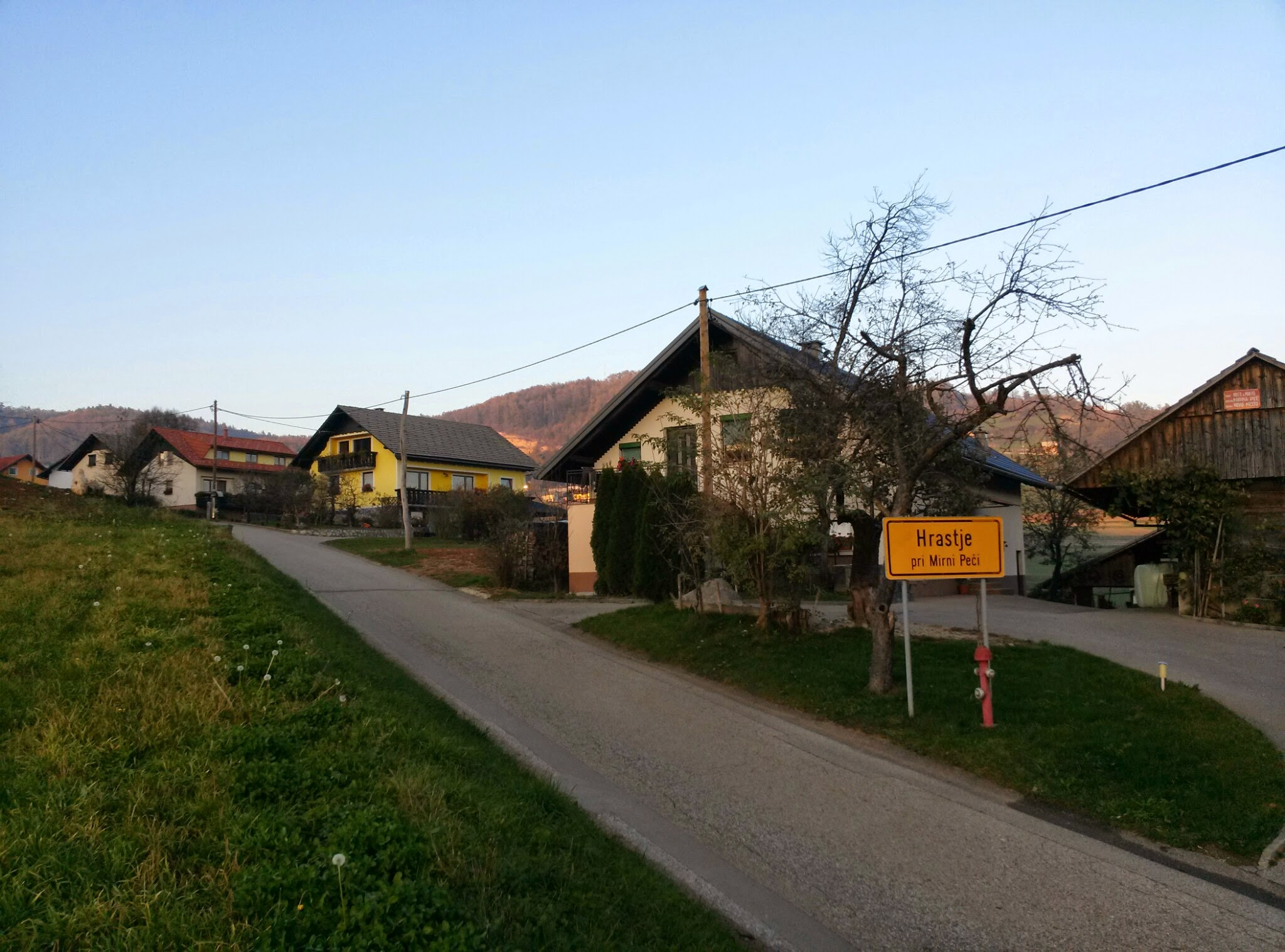

- Location in Slovenia
- Coordinates: 45°52′52.9″N 15°5′56.16″E
- Country: Slovenia
- Traditional region: Lower Carniola
- Statistical region: Southeast Slovenia
- Municipality: Mirna Peč

Area
  - Total: 0.73 km^{2} (0.28 sq mi)
- Elevation: 309.9 m (1,017 ft)

Population (2002)
  - Total: 72

Hrastje pri Mirni Peči (pronounced [ˈxɾàːstjɛ pɾi ˈmiːɾni ˈpɛːtʃi, ˈxɾáː-]) is a small settlement in the Municipality of Mirna Peč in southeastern Slovenia. The area is part of the traditional region of Lower Carniola and is now included in the Southeast Slovenia Statistical Region.

== Name ==
The name of the settlement was changed from Hrastje to Hrastje pri Mirni Peči (literally, 'Hrastje near Mirna Peč') in 1953. The name Hrastje is derived from the Slovene common noun hrast 'oak', referring to the local vegetation.
