= Vrhovo pri Mirni Peči =

- Location in Slovenia
- Coordinates: 45°50′4.8″N 15°5′28.98″E
- Country: Slovenia
- Traditional region: Lower Carniola
- Statistical region: Southeast Slovenia
- Municipality: Mirna Peč

Area
  - Total: 1.12 km^{2} (0.43 sq mi)
- Elevation: 253 m (830 ft)

Population (2002)
  - Total: 77

Vrhovo pri Mirni Peči (pronounced [ʋəɾˈxɔːʋɔ pɾi ˈmiːɾni ˈpɛːtʃi]) is a small settlement in the Municipality of Mirna Peč in southeastern Slovenia. The municipality is included in the Southeast Slovenia Statistical Region. The entire area is part of the historical region of Lower Carniola.
