= Mali Vrh, Mirna Peč =

Mali Vrh
- Location in Slovenia
- Coordinates: 45°50′38.82″N 15°5′27.18″E
- Country: Slovenia
- Traditional region: Lower Carniola
- Statistical region: Southeast Slovenia
- Municipality: Mirna Peč

Area
  - Total: 0.46 km^{2} (0.18 sq mi)
- Elevation: 271 m (889 ft)

Population (2002)
  - Total: 45

Mali Vrh (pronounced [ˈmaːli ˈʋəɾx]) is a small village in the Municipality of Mirna Peč in southeastern Slovenia. The area is part of the historical region of Lower Carniola. The municipality is now included in the Southeast Slovenia Statistical Region.

== Name ==
Mali Vrh was attested in historical sources as sand Matheus in 1386, Perg in 1433, and Mons in 1490, among other names.

== Church ==
The local church is dedicated to Saint Matthew (Slovene: sveti Matevž) and belongs to the Parish of Mirna Peč. It preserves some of its late Gothic features despite being restyled in the Baroque in the early 17th century.
