= Gorenji Podboršt, Mirna Peč =

Gorenji Podboršt
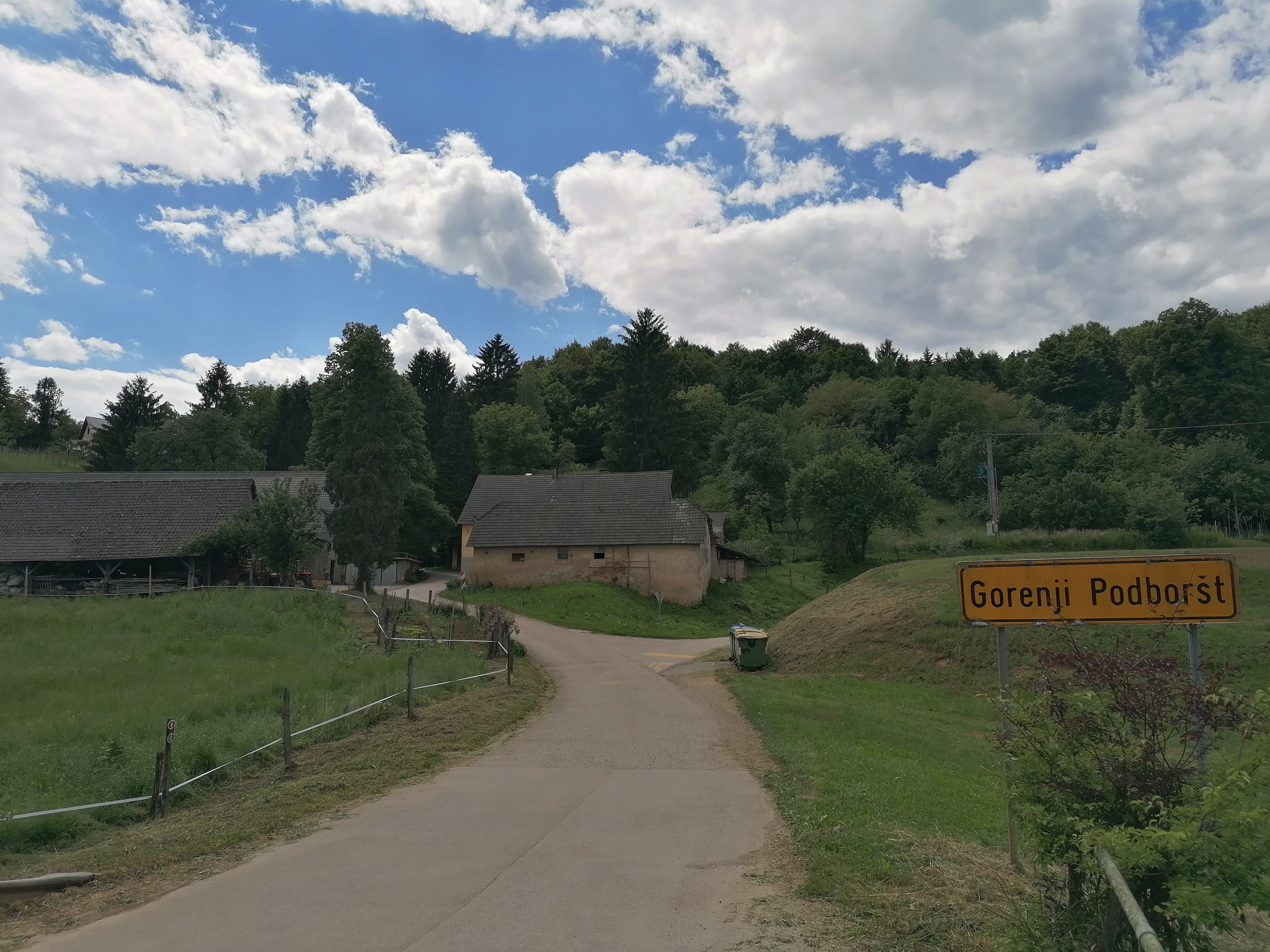

- Location in Slovenia
- Coordinates: 45°51′8″N 15°4′44.58″E
- Country: Slovenia
- Traditional region: Lower Carniola
- Statistical region: Southeast Slovenia
- Municipality: Mirna Peč

Area
  - Total: 0.67 km^{2} (0.26 sq mi)
- Elevation: 247.1 m (811 ft)

Population (2002)
  - Total: 74

Gorenji Podboršt (pronounced [ɡɔˈɾeːnji pɔdˈbɔɾʃt]) is a settlement in the Municipality of Mirna Peč in southeastern Slovenia. It lies on the right bank of the Temenica River just south of Mirna Peč itself. The area is part of the historical region of Lower Carniola and is now included in the Southeast Slovenia Statistical Region.
