= Hmeljčič =

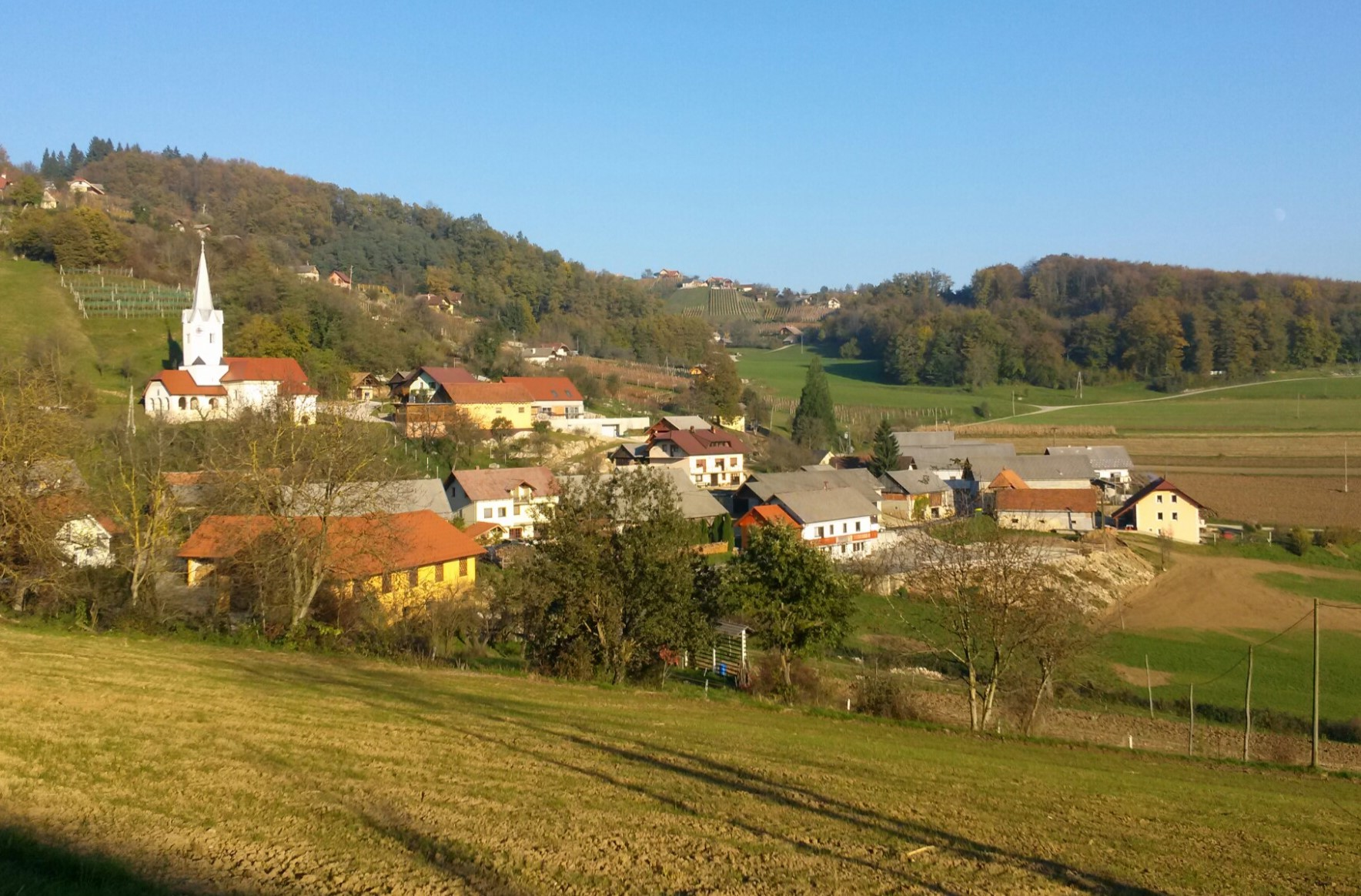

- Location in Slovenia
- Coordinates: 45°52′37.72″N 15°7′18.08″E
- Country: Slovenia
- Traditional region: Lower Carniola
- Statistical region: Southeast Slovenia
- Municipality: Mirna Peč

Area
  - Total: 1.53 km^{2} (0.59 sq mi)
- Elevation: 329.2 m (1,080 ft)

Population (2002)
  - Total: 64

Hmeljčič (pronounced [ˈxmeːltʃitʃ]) is a settlement in the Municipality of Mirna Peč in southeastern Slovenia. The area is part of the historical region of Lower Carniola. The municipality is now included in the Southeast Slovenia Statistical Region.

Evidence of an Iron Age hill fort has been identified in the settlement. The local church is dedicated to the Assumption of Mary and belongs to the Parish of Mirna Peč. It is a medieval building and preserved some 15th-century wall paintings on its interior. It was restyled in the Baroque in the 18th century.
