= Čemše =

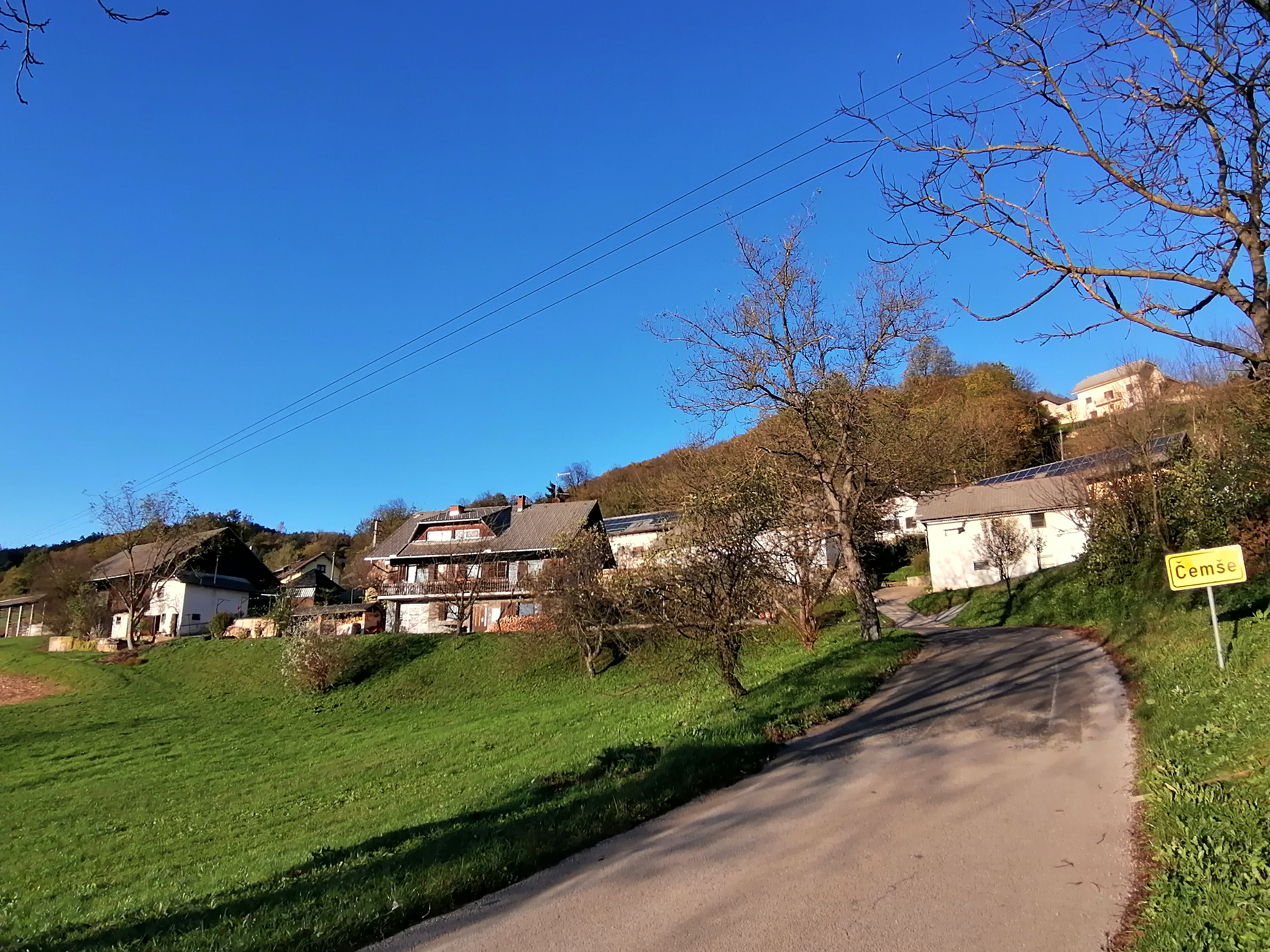

- Location in Slovenia
- Coordinates: 45°53′0.33″N 15°6′17.97″E
- Country: Slovenia
- Traditional region: Lower Carniola
- Statistical region: Southeast Slovenia
- Municipality: Mirna Peč

Area
  - Total: 0.65 km^{2} (0.25 sq mi)
- Elevation: 330.6 m (1,085 ft)

Population (2002)
  - Total: 44

Čemše (pronounced [ˈtʃeːmʃɛ]) is a small settlement in the Municipality of Mirna Peč in southeastern Slovenia. The main regional road from Ljubljana to Novo Mesto runs along the western edge of the settlement. The area is part of the historical region of Lower Carniola. The municipality is now included in the Southeast Slovenia Statistical Region.
