= Globočdol =

- Location in Slovenia
- Coordinates: 45°52′25.89″N 15°7′54.37″E
- Country: Slovenia
- Traditional region: Lower Carniola
- Statistical region: Southeast Slovenia
- Municipality: Mirna Peč

Area
  - Total: 0.54 km^{2} (0.21 sq mi)
- Elevation: 336.2 m (1,103 ft)

Population (2002)
  - Total: 27

Globočdol (pronounced [ɡlɔˈboːtʃdɔu̯]) is a small settlement in the Municipality of Mirna Peč in southeastern Slovenia. The area is part of the historical region of Lower Carniola and is now included in the Southeast Slovenia Statistical Region.
