= Dolenji Podboršt, Mirna Peč =

Dolenji Podboršt
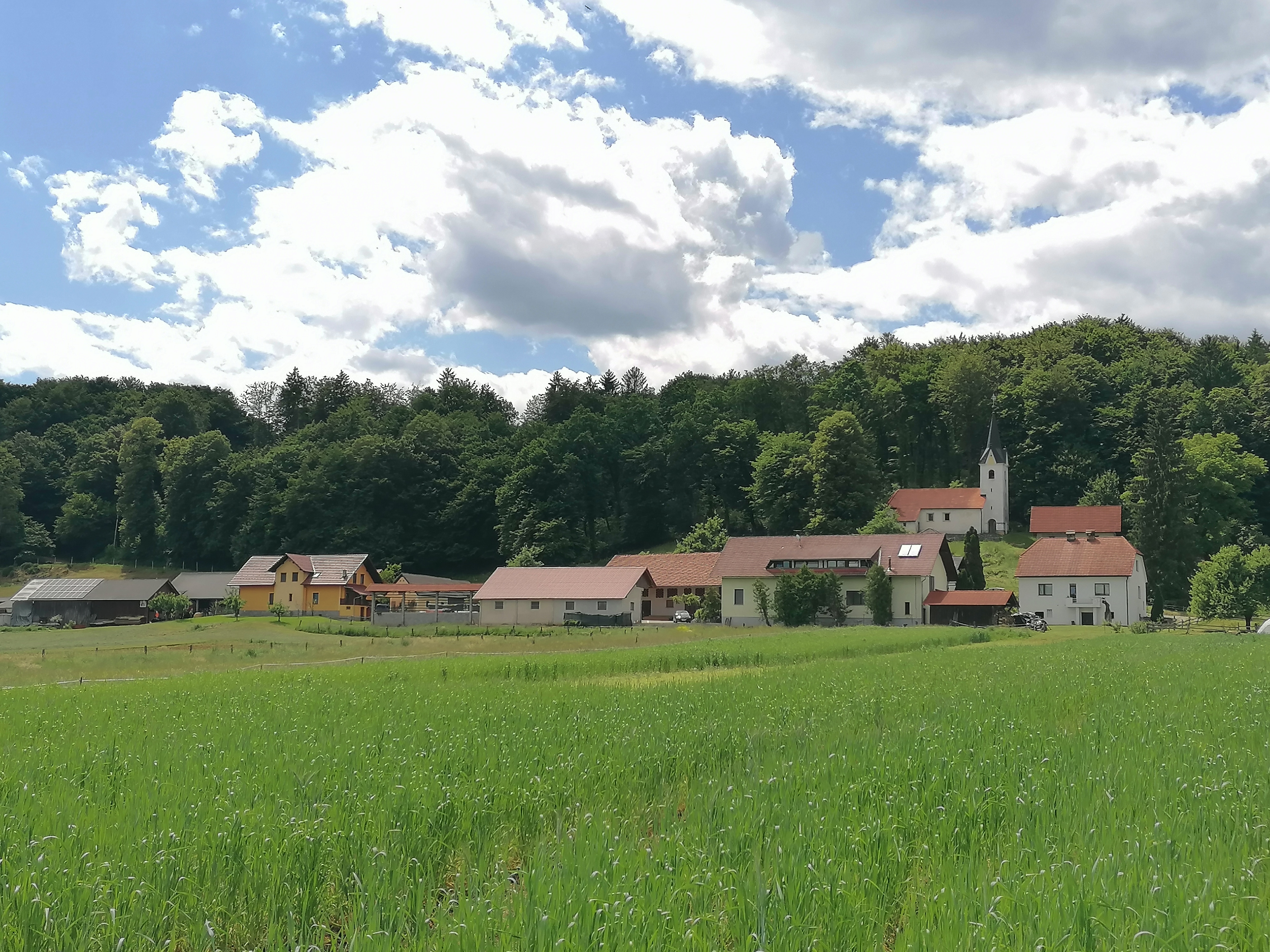

- Location in Slovenia
- Coordinates: 45°50′51.47″N 15°4′58.47″E
- Country: Slovenia
- Traditional region: Lower Carniola
- Statistical region: Southeast Slovenia
- Municipality: Mirna Peč

Area
  - Total: 0.54 km^{2} (0.21 sq mi)
- Elevation: 236.3 m (775 ft)

Population (2002)
  - Total: 31

Dolenji Podboršt (pronounced [dɔˈleːnji pɔdˈbɔɾʃt]) is a small settlement in the Municipality of Mirna Peč in southeastern Slovenia. It lies on the right bank of the Temenica River south of Mirna Peč. The area is part of the historical region of Lower Carniola. The municipality is now included in the Southeast Slovenia Statistical Region.

The local church is dedicated to Paul the Apostle and belongs to the Parish of Mirna Peč. It dates to the 16th century.
