= Dolenji Globodol =

- Location in Slovenia
- Coordinates: 45°50′27.25″N 15°2′51.44″E
- Country: Slovenia
- Traditional region: Lower Carniola
- Statistical region: Southeast Slovenia
- Municipality: Mirna Peč

Area
  - Total: 1.9 km^{2} (0.73 sq mi)
- Elevation: 201 m (659 ft)

Population (2002)
  - Total: 48

Dolenji Globodol (pronounced [dɔˈleːnji ˈɡloːbɔdɔu̯], German: Untertiefenthal) is a settlement in the Municipality of Mirna Peč in southeastern Slovenia. The area is part of the historical region of Lower Carniola. The municipality is now included in the Southeast Slovenia Statistical Region.

The local church is dedicated to Mary Magdalene and belongs to the Parish of Mirna Peč. It is a medieval building that was restyled in the Baroque in the early 17th century.
