= Dolenja Vas pri Mirni Peči =

- Location in Slovenia
- Coordinates: 45°52′35.4″N 15°6′4.48″E
- Country: Slovenia
- Traditional region: Lower Carniola
- Statistical region: Southeast Slovenia
- Municipality: Mirna Peč

Area
  - Total: 2.69 km^{2} (1.04 sq mi)
- Elevation: 266.3 m (874 ft)

Population (2002)
  - Total: 88

Dolenja Vas pri Mirni Peči (pronounced [dɔˈlèːnja ˈʋáːs pɾi ˈmiːɾni ˈpɛːtʃi]) is a small village in the Municipality of Mirna Peč in southeastern Slovenia. The area is part of the historical region of Lower Carniola and is now included in the Southeast Slovenia Statistical Region.

== Name ==
The name of the settlement was changed from Dolenja vas to Dolenja vas pri Mirni Peči in 1953.

== Notable people ==
Notable people that were born or lived in Dolenja Vas pri Mirni Peči include:

- Alojzij Progar (1857–1918), sculptor
