= Jablan, Mirna Peč =

Jablan
- Location in Slovenia
- Coordinates: 45°50′16.78″N 15°5′40.59″E
- Country: Slovenia
- Traditional region: Lower Carniola
- Statistical region: Southeast Slovenia
- Municipality: Mirna Peč

Area
  - Total: 2.99 km^{2} (1.15 sq mi)
- Elevation: 262.3 m (861 ft)

Population (2002)
  - Total: 146

Jablan (pronounced [ˈjaːblan]) is a settlement in the Municipality of Mirna Peč in the traditional region of Lower Carniola of southeastern Slovenia. The municipality is now included in the Southeast Slovenia Statistical Region.
