= Jelše, Mirna Peč =

Jelše
- Location in Slovenia
- Coordinates: 45°52′33.22″N 15°4′6.68″E
- Country: Slovenia
- Traditional region: Lower Carniola
- Statistical region: Southeast Slovenia
- Municipality: Mirna Peč

Area
  - Total: 1.13 km^{2} (0.44 sq mi)
- Elevation: 280.5 m (920 ft)

Population (2002)
  - Total: 19

Jelše (pronounced [ˈjeːu̯ʃɛ]) is a small settlement in the Municipality of Mirna Peč in southeastern Slovenia. It lies on the left bank of the Temenica River near where it reemerges from its underground course, just north of Mirna Peč. The railway line from Ljubljana to Novo Mesto runs just east of the settlement. The area is part of the historical region of Lower Carniola and is now included in the Southeast Slovenia Statistical Region.
