= Griže, Ivančna Gorica =

Griže
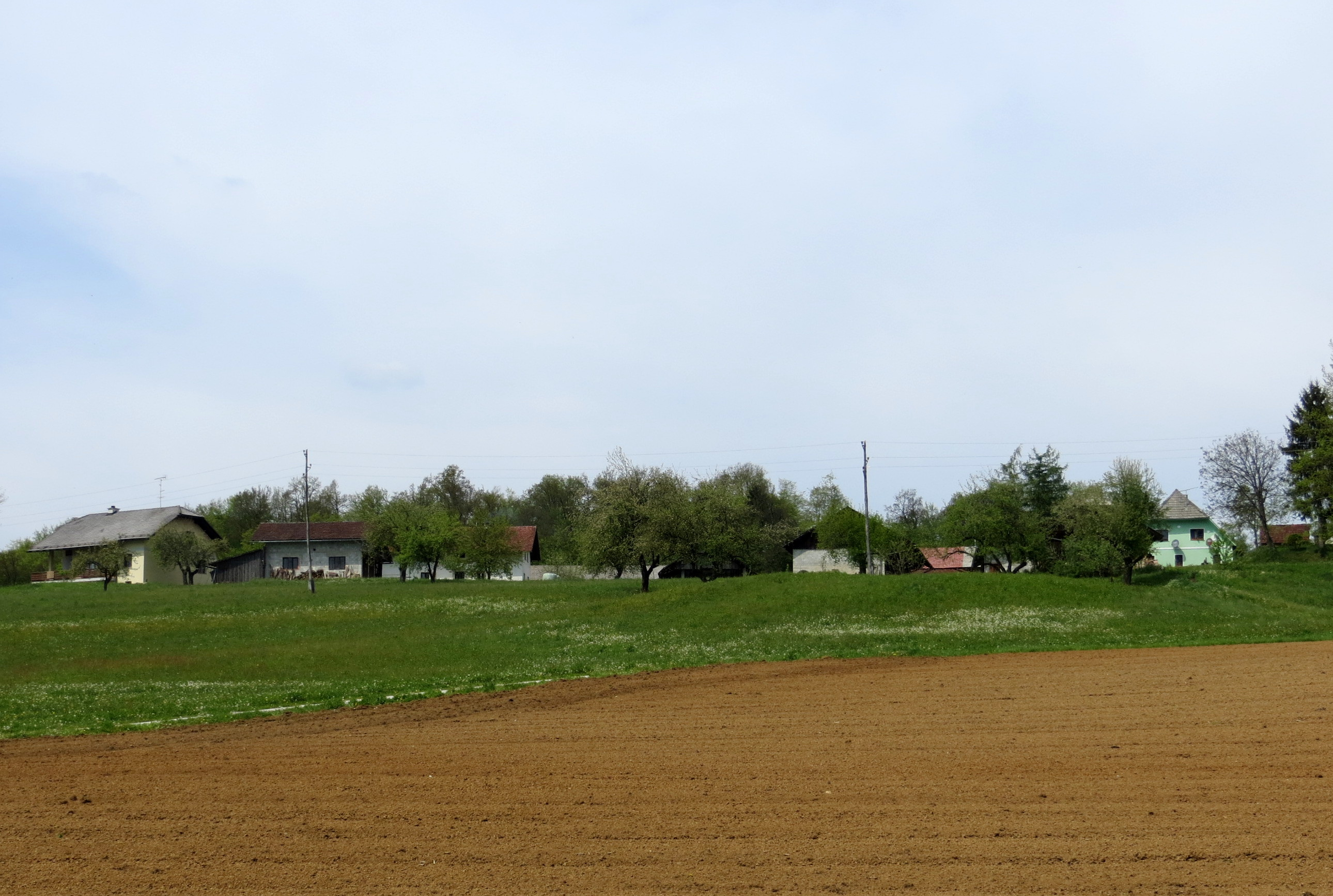

- Location in Slovenia
- Coordinates: 45°56′47″N 14°49′27″E
- Country: Slovenia
- Traditional region: Lower Carniola
- Statistical region: Central Slovenia
- Municipality: Ivančna Gorica

Area
  - Total: 0.19 km^{2} (0.073 sq mi)
- Elevation: 336 m (1,102 ft)

Population (2002)
  - Total: 17

Griže (pronounced [ˈɡɾiːʒɛ]; German: Grische) is a small settlement in the Municipality of Ivančna Gorica in central Slovenia. It lies on the regional road from Ivančna Gorica to Šentvid pri Stični in the historical region of Lower Carniola. The municipality is now included in the Central Slovenia Statistical Region. It includes the hamlet of Vrh (German: Werch).
