= Griže, Sežana =

Griže
- Location in Slovenia
- Coordinates: 45°45′22.75″N 13°56′35.13″E
- Country: Slovenia
- Traditional region: Littoral
- Statistical region: Coastal–Karst
- Municipality: Sežana

Area
  - Total: 6.87 km^{2} (2.65 sq mi)
- Elevation: 407 m (1,335 ft)

Population (2002)
  - Total: 51

Griže (pronounced [ˈɡɾiːʒɛ], German: Grische) is a village in the Municipality of Sežana in the traditional Inner Carniola region of Slovenia. It is now generally regarded as part of the Slovenian Littoral.

The local church is dedicated to Saint Martin and belongs to the Parish of Vrabče.
