= Gabrk, Škofja Loka =

Gabrk
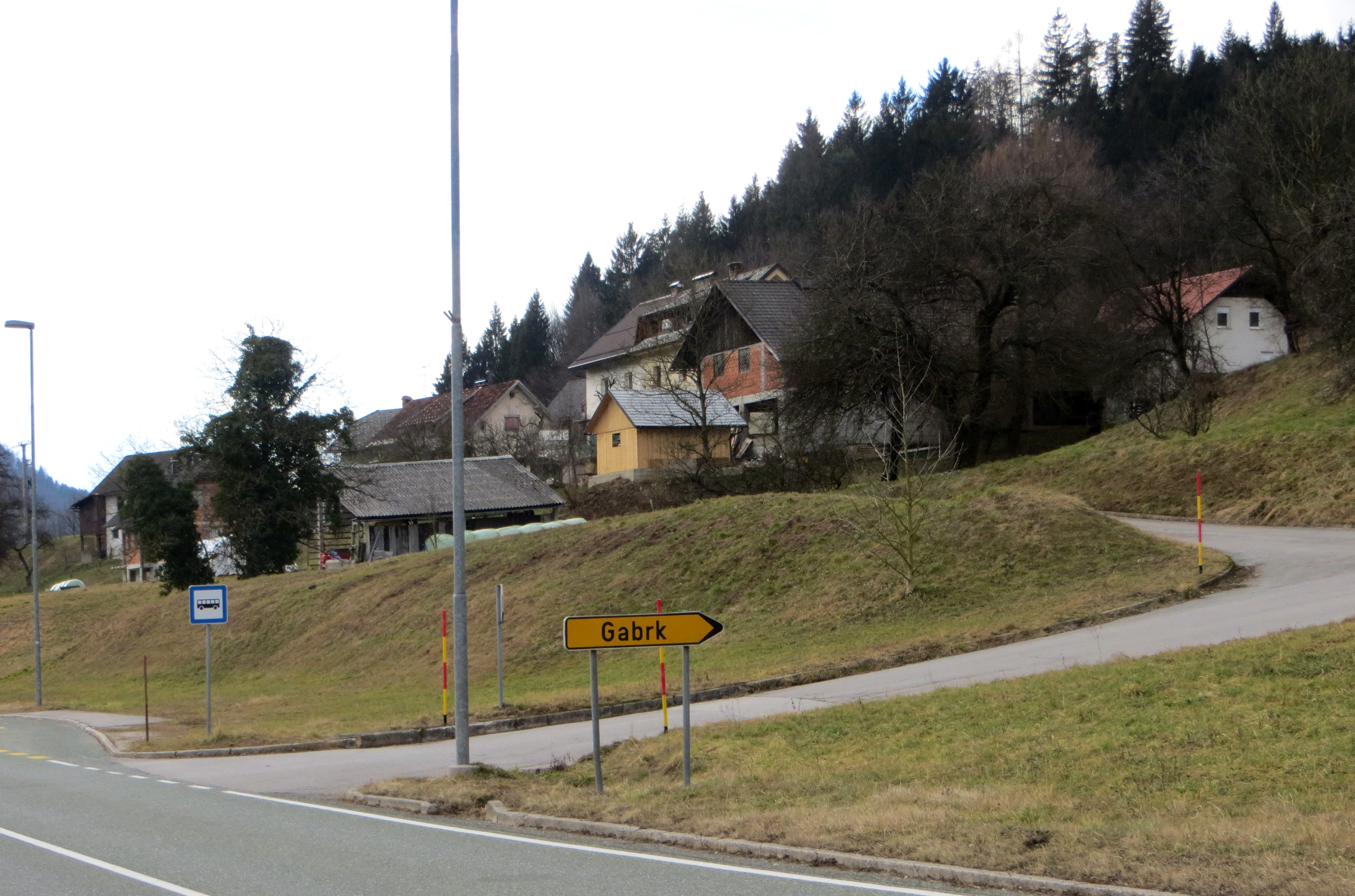

- Location in Slovenia
- Coordinates: 46°8′9.61″N 14°14′50.14″E
- Country: Slovenia
- Traditional region: Upper Carniola
- Statistical region: Upper Carniola
- Municipality: Škofja Loka

Area
  - Total: 1.52 km^{2} (0.59 sq mi)
- Elevation: 376.3 m (1,235 ft)

Population (2002)
  - Total: 97

Gabrk (pronounced [ˈɡaːbəɾk]) is a small village on the left bank of the Poljane Sora River in the Municipality of Škofja Loka in the Upper Carniola region of Slovenia.

== Name ==
Gabrk was attested in historical sources as Gabrich in 1286, Gaberch in 1296, Gabriach circa 1400, and Gaberkch in 1414. The name comes from the common noun *gabrik 'hornbeam forest' (from gaber 'hornbeam'), referring to the local vegetation.
