= Jelša, Lukovica =

Jelša
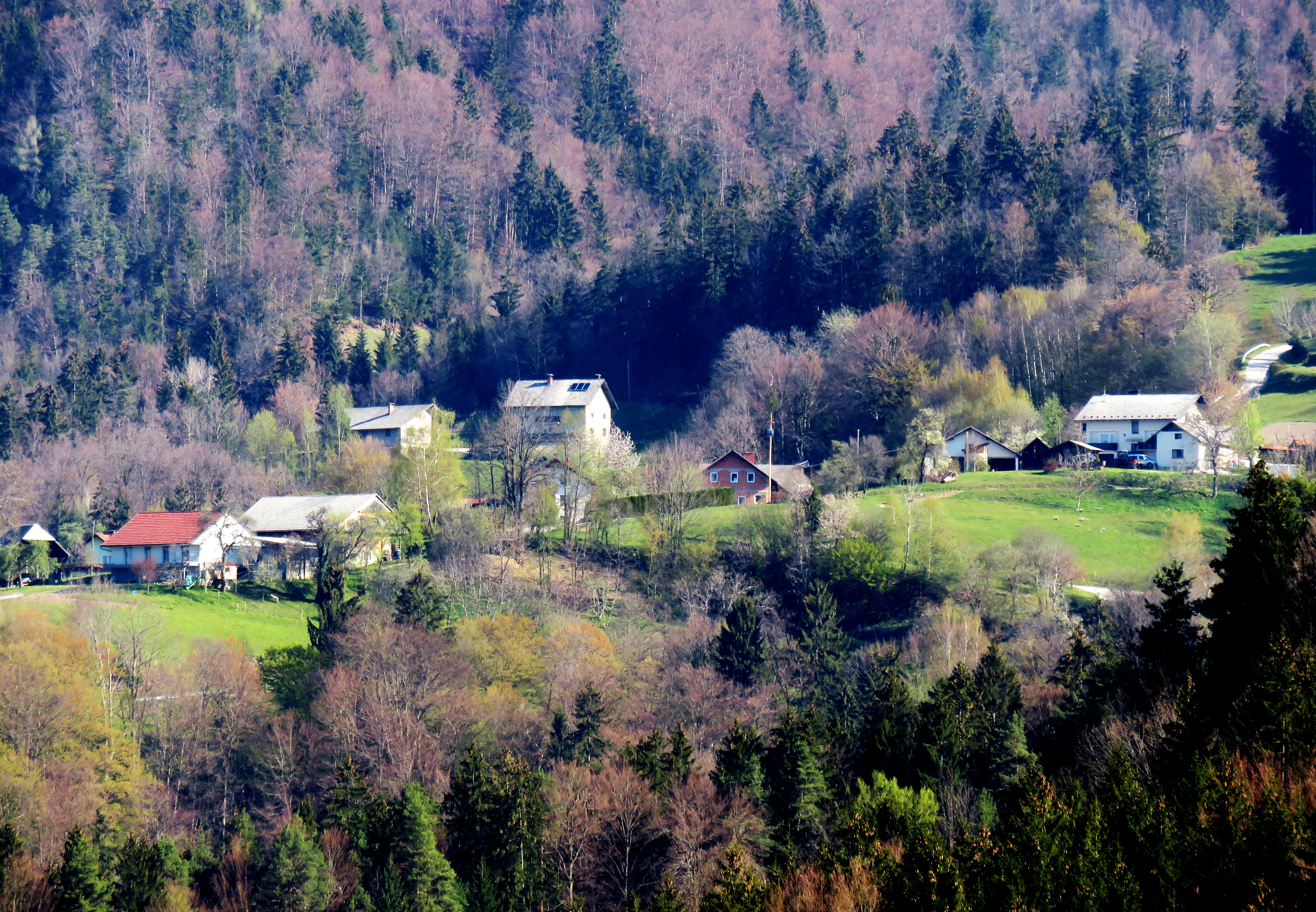

- Location in Slovenia
- Coordinates: 46°11′14.42″N 14°48′11.6″E
- Country: Slovenia
- Traditional region: Upper Carniola
- Statistical region: Central Slovenia
- Municipality: Lukovica

Area
  - Total: 0.83 km^{2} (0.32 sq mi)
- Elevation: 517.9 m (1,699 ft)

Population (2002)
  - Total: 47

Jelša (pronounced [ˈjeːu̯ʃa]; in older sources also Jelše, German: Jelsche) is a small settlement north of Blagovica in the Municipality of Lukovica in the eastern part of the Upper Carniola region of Slovenia. The settlement includes the hamlets of Brdar, Mlinar, Spodnja Jelša (German: Unterjelsche), Srednjek, and Zgornja Jelša (German: Oberjelsche).
