= Jelša, Šmartno pri Litiji =

Jelša Jelše (until 1990)
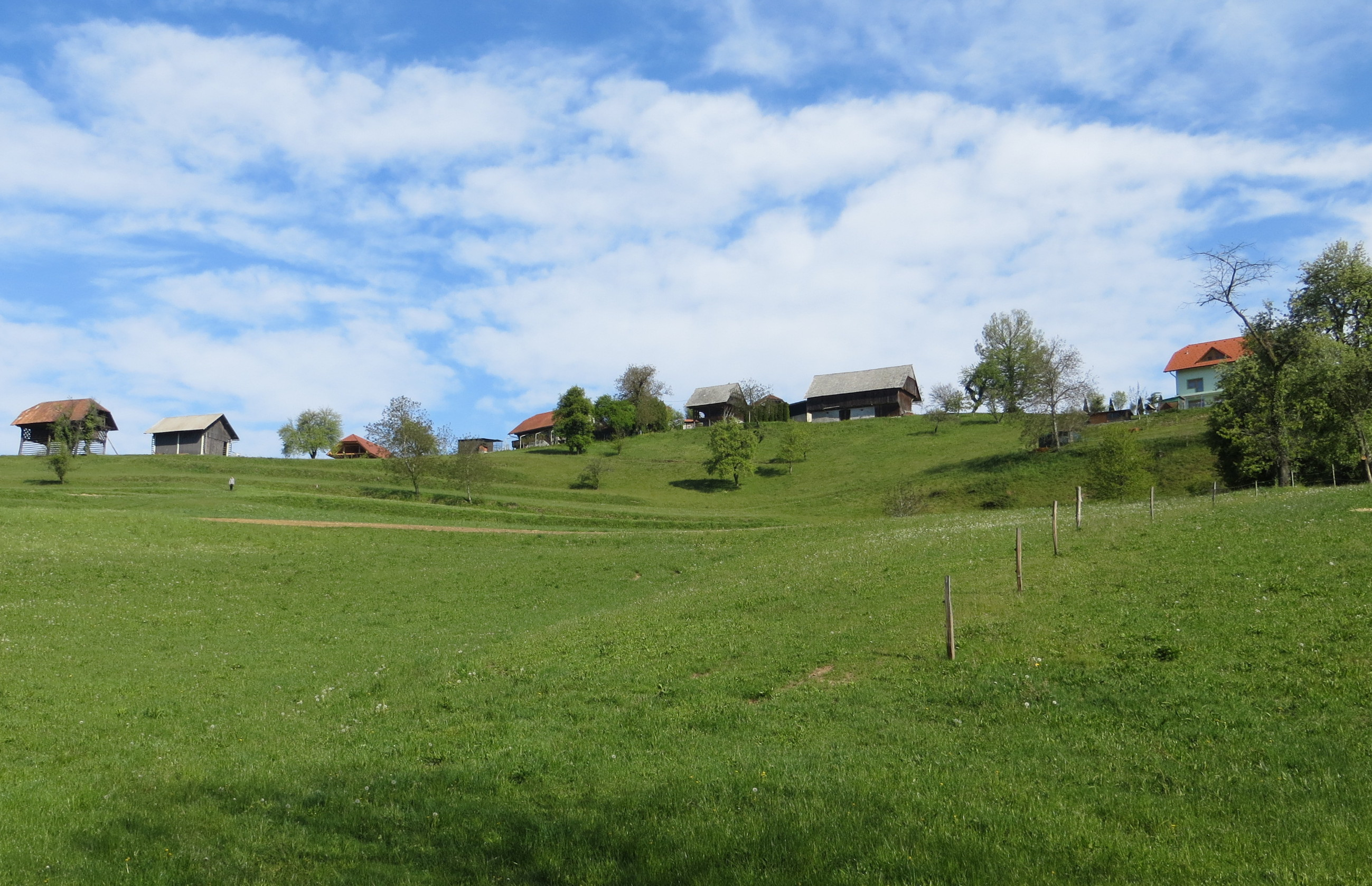

- Location in Slovenia
- Coordinates: 46°1′47.01″N 14°53′13.08″E
- Country: Slovenia
- Traditional region: Lower Carniola
- Statistical region: Central Slovenia
- Municipality: Šmartno pri Litiji

Area
  - Total: 1.54 km^{2} (0.59 sq mi)
- Elevation: 417.7 m (1,370 ft)

Population (2002)
  - Total: 94

Jelša (pronounced [ˈjeːu̯ʃa]) is a dispersed settlement in the hills above Velika Kostrevnica in the Municipality of Šmartno pri Litiji in central Slovenia. The area is part of the historical region of Lower Carniola. The municipality is now included in the Central Slovenia Statistical Region.

== Name ==
The name of the settlement was changed from Jelše to Jelša in 1990.

== Church ==
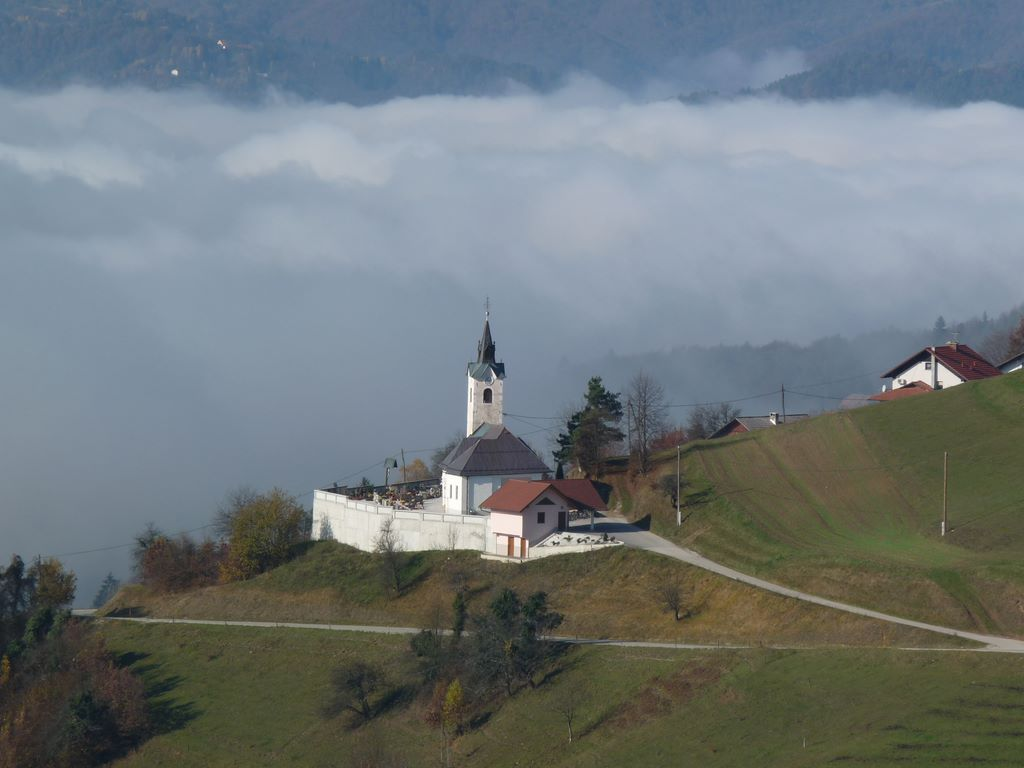
Sts. Hermagoras and Fortunatus Church on Liberga

The local church is dedicated to Saints Hermagoras and Fortunatus and belongs to the Parish of Šmartno. It dates to the 17th century.
