= Golobinjek, Mirna Peč =

Golobinjek
- Location in Slovenia
- Coordinates: 45°50′52.14″N 15°4′29.27″E
- Country: Slovenia
- Traditional region: Lower Carniola
- Statistical region: Southeast Slovenia
- Municipality: Mirna Peč

Area
  - Total: 3.86 km^{2} (1.49 sq mi)
- Elevation: 333.3 m (1,094 ft)

Population (2002)
  - Total: 56

Golobinjek (pronounced [ɡɔlɔˈbiːnjɛk]) is a settlement in the Municipality of Mirna Peč in southeastern Slovenia. The area is part of the historical region of Lower Carniola. The municipality is now included in the Southeast Slovenia Statistical Region.

The local church is dedicated to Saint Ursula and belongs to the Parish of Mirna Peč. It dates to the 17th century.
