= Gabrska Gora, Litija =

Gabrska Gora
- Location in Slovenia
- Coordinates: 45°59′12.67″N 14°57′44.29″E
- Country: Slovenia
- Traditional region: Lower Carniola
- Statistical region: Central Sava
- Municipality: Litija

Area
  - Total: 2.2 km^{2} (0.85 sq mi)
- Elevation: 420.1 m (1,378 ft)

Population (2002)
  - Total: 51
- Postal code: 1274

Gabrska Gora (pronounced [ˈɡaːbəɾska ˈɡɔːɾa]) is a settlement south of Gabrovka in the Municipality of Litija in central Slovenia. The area is part of the traditional region of Lower Carniola. It is now included with the rest of the municipality in the Central Sava Statistical Region; until January 2014 the municipality was part of the Central Slovenia Statistical Region. It includes the hamlets of Gora, Stari Boršt, Gabrje, and Turn (German: Gallenstein).

== Castles ==
The ruins of two castles are found in Gabrska Gora. Turn Castle (German: Gallenstein) was owned by the Counts of Gallenberg. It was initially built as a fortified tower, and was later expanded and ornamented. It was inhabited until the Second World War, when it was owned by Marina Porca. Gabrja Castle (German: Gallenhoff) stood nearby and was also owned by the Gallenberg family.

== Church ==
The local church is dedicated to the Assumption of Mary and belongs to the Parish of Gabrovka. It dates to the 16th century and was restyled in the 18th century.
