= Gradež, Velike Lašče =

Gradež
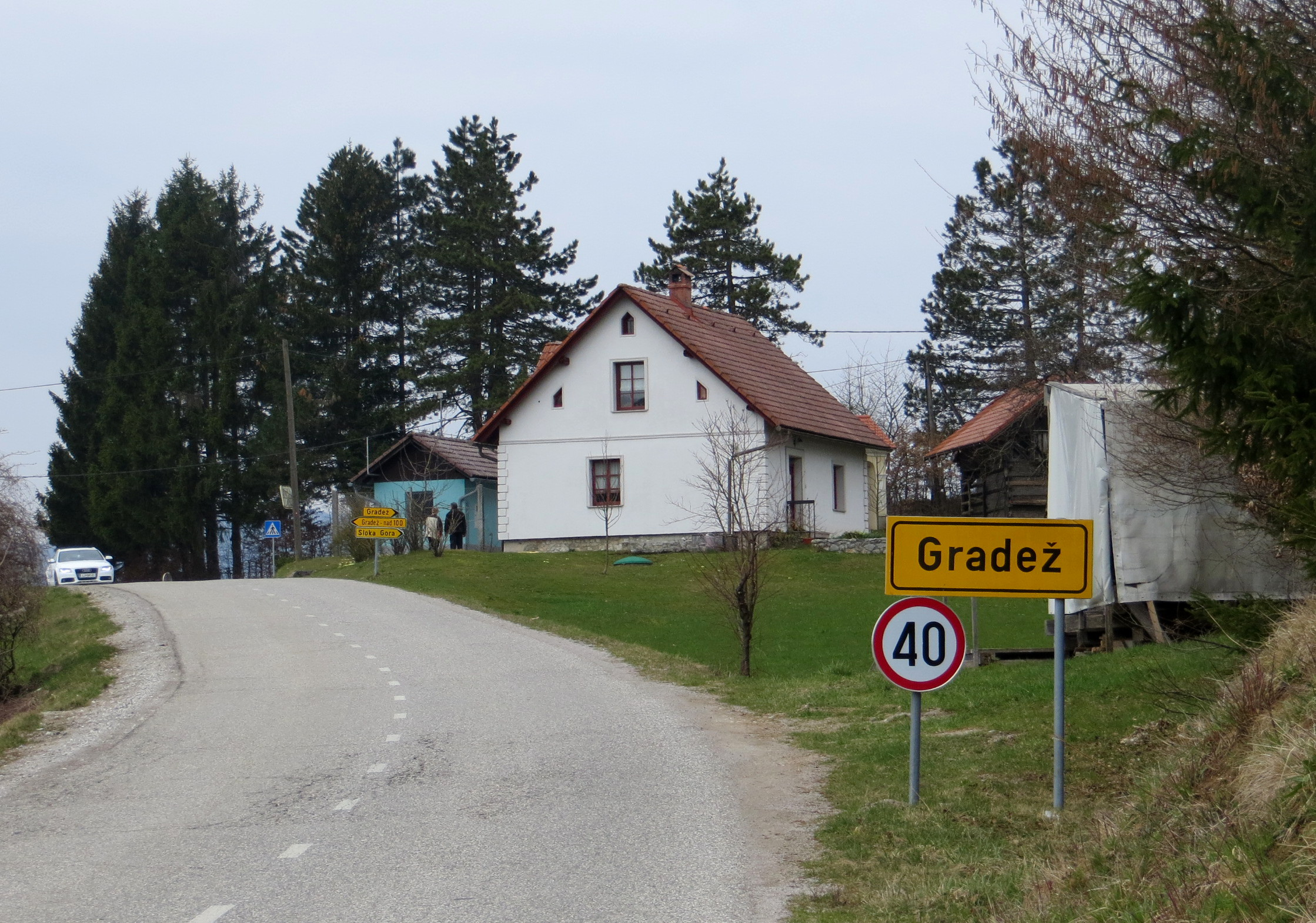

- Location in Slovenia
- Coordinates: 45°52′53.8″N 14°37′24.79″E
- Country: Slovenia
- Traditional region: Lower Carniola
- Statistical region: Central Slovenia
- Municipality: Velike Lašče

Area
  - Total: 1.68 km^{2} (0.65 sq mi)
- Elevation: 598.5 m (1,964 ft)

Population (2002)
  - Total: 150
- Postal code: 1311

Gradež (pronounced [ˈɡɾaːdɛʃ]) is a settlement east of Turjak in the Municipality of Velike Lašče in central Slovenia. The area is part of the traditional region of Lower Carniola and is now included in the Central Slovenia Statistical Region.

== Cultural Heritage ==
Registered cultural heritage in Gradec includes:

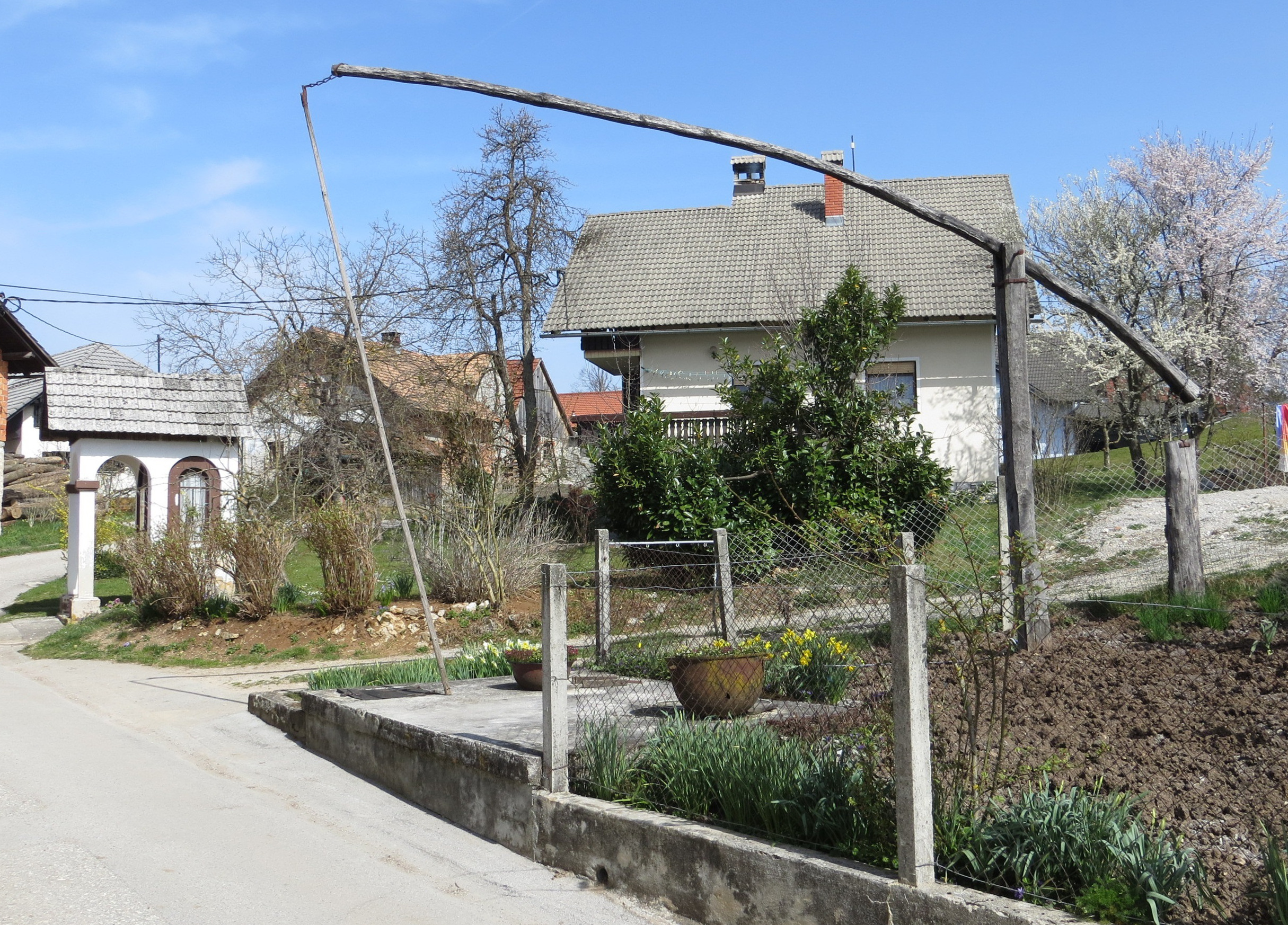
A cistern sweep in Gradež

- The village center with a characteristic clustered layout on both sides of the street, and a cistern sweep (Slovene: vodnjak na čapljo). The characteristic stone houses have traditionally decorated facades.
- A village fruit-drying building dating from 1938. It contains a drying stove and 12 wooden racks with wire frames. The building underwent reconstruction in 2003.
- The Strle hayrack stands northwest of the village and belongs to the farm at Gradež no. 7. It is a single straight-line hayrack with three frames and a catslide roof with two frames. It is built of oak and held together with dowels.
