= Goriška Vas, Mirna Peč =

Goriška Vas
- Location in Slovenia
- Coordinates: 45°50′14.87″N 15°5′1.65″E
- Country: Slovenia
- Traditional region: Lower Carniola
- Statistical region: Southeast Slovenia
- Municipality: Mirna Peč

Area
  - Total: 0.89 km^{2} (0.34 sq mi)
- Elevation: 248 m (814 ft)

Population (2002)
  - Total: 71

Goriška Vas (pronounced [ɡɔˈɾiːʃka ˈʋaːs]) is a small village in the Municipality of Mirna Peč in southeastern Slovenia. The municipality is included in the Southeast Slovenia Statistical Region. The area is part of the traditional region of Lower Carniola.
