= Šmarje pri Jelšah =

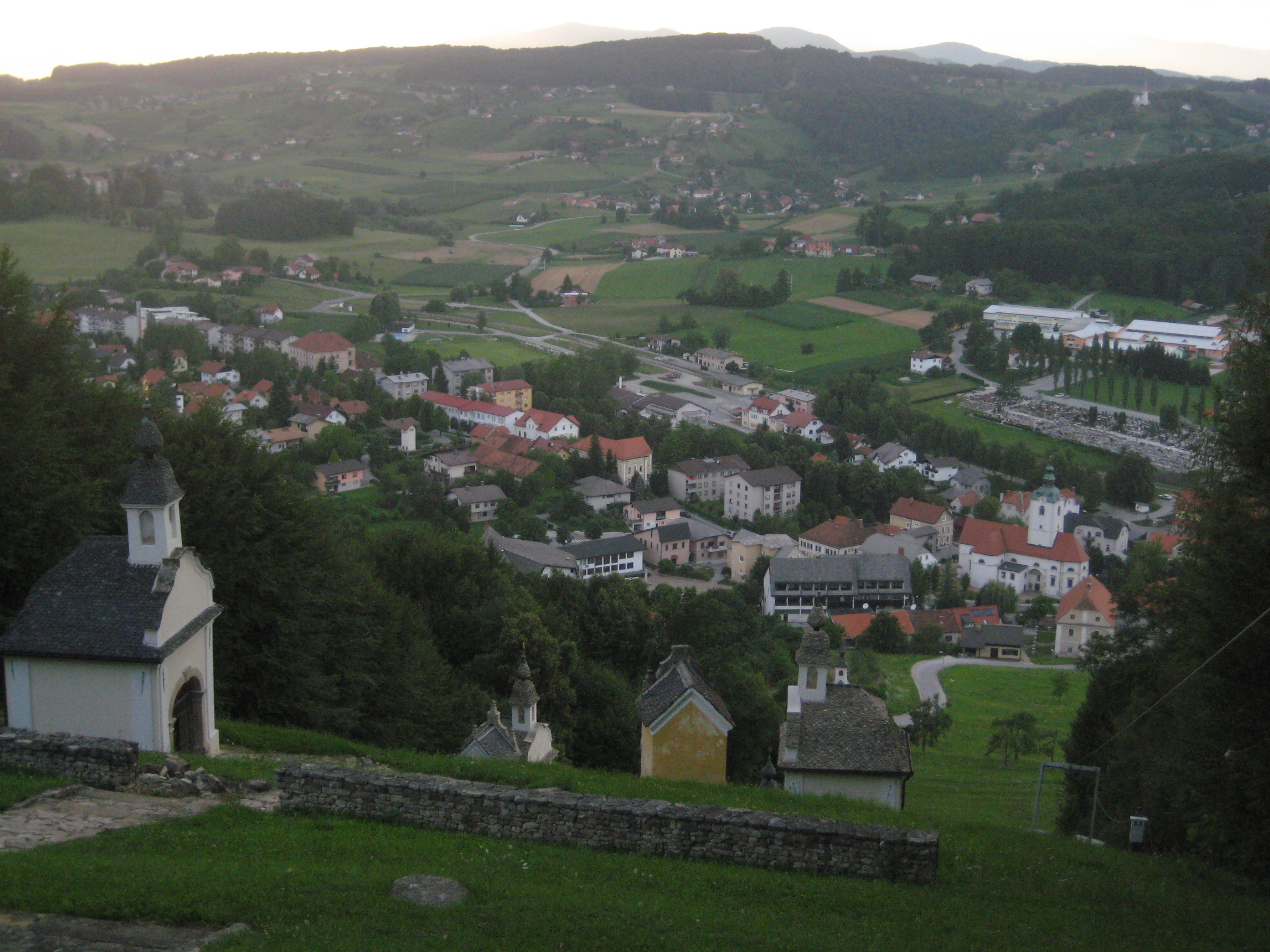
- View of Šmarje pri Jelšah from St. Roch's Church

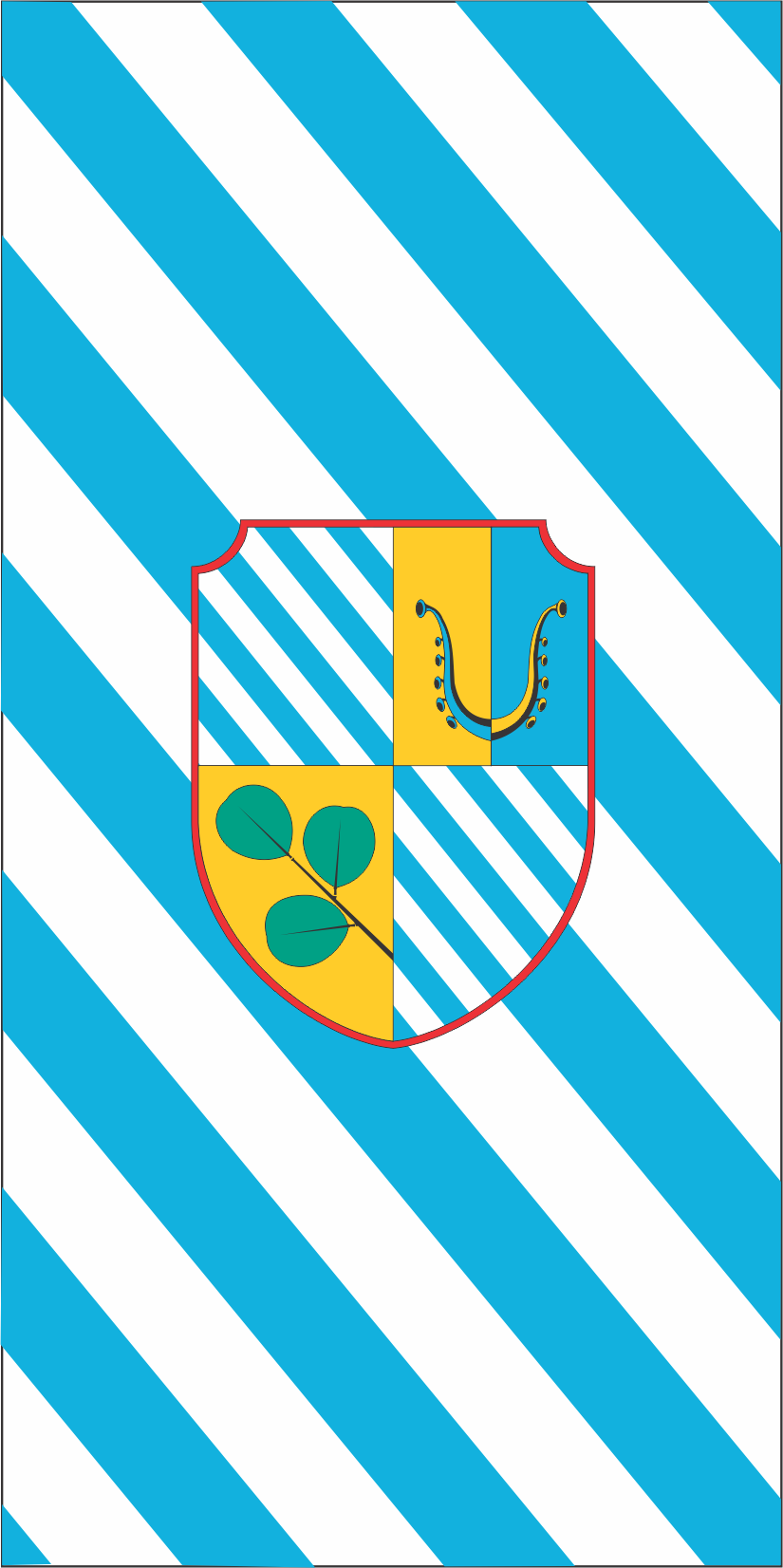
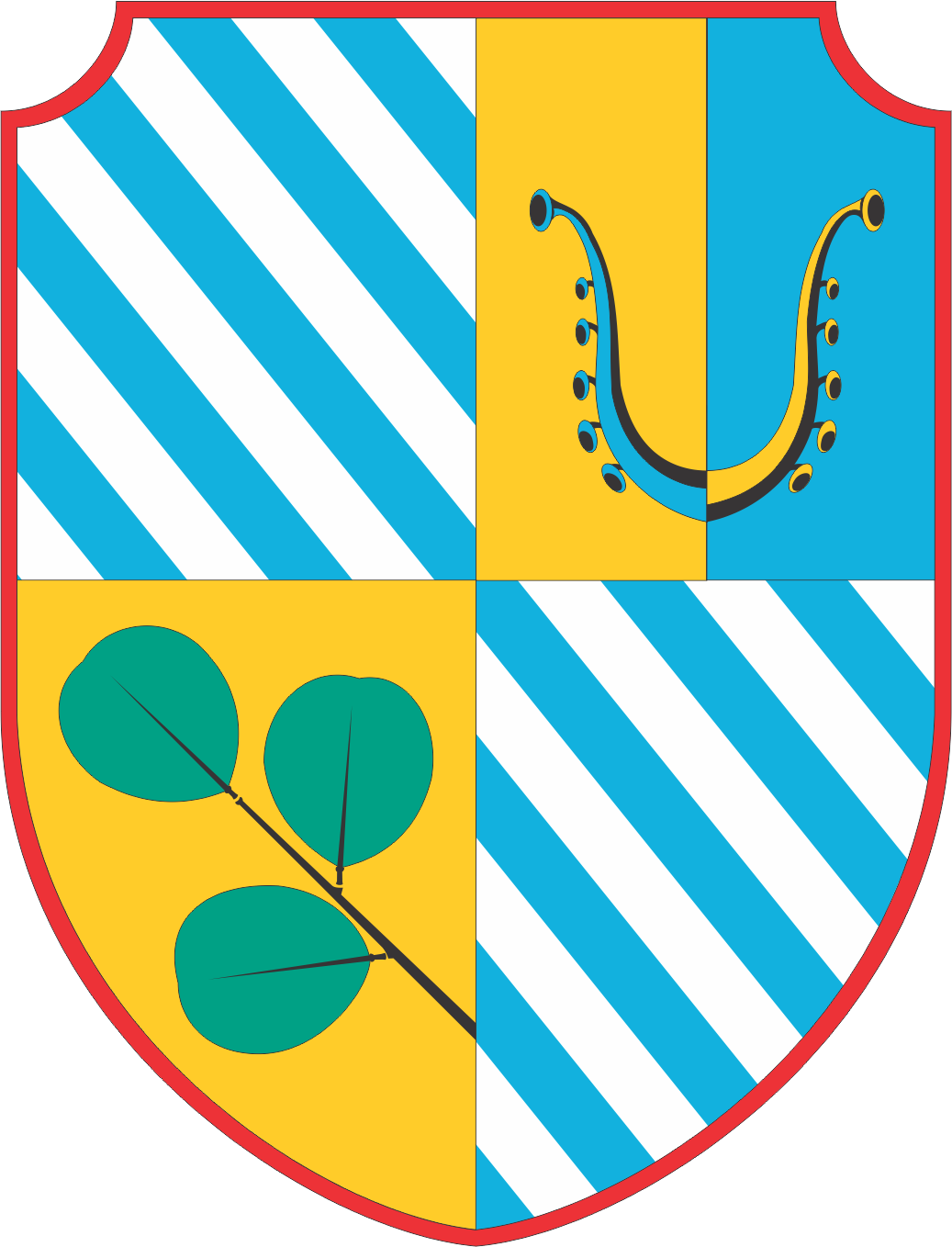
- Flag Coat of arms

- Location in Slovenia
- Coordinates: 46°13′41.06″N 15°31′5.44″E
- Country: Slovenia
- Traditional region: Styria
- Statistical region: Savinja
- Municipality: Šmarje pri Jelšah

Area
  - Total: 1.94 km^{2} (0.75 sq mi)
- Elevation: 234.1 m (768 ft)

Population (2019)
  - Total: 1,755
- Vehicle registration: CE

Šmarje pri Jelšah (pronounced [ˈʃmaːɾjɛ pɾi ˈjeːlʃax]; German: Sankt Marein bei Erlachstein) is a town in eastern Slovenia. It is the seat of the Municipality of Šmarje pri Jelšah. The area is part of the traditional region of Styria. The municipality is now included in the Savinja Statistical Region. The development of the settlement is associated with a medieval mansion known as Jelšingrad on a slight hill northwest of the town.

The local parish church is dedicated to the Assumption of Mary (Slovene: Sveta Marija Vnebovzeta) and belongs to the Roman Catholic Archdiocese of Maribor. It dates to the late 13th century with 18th- and 19th-century additions.

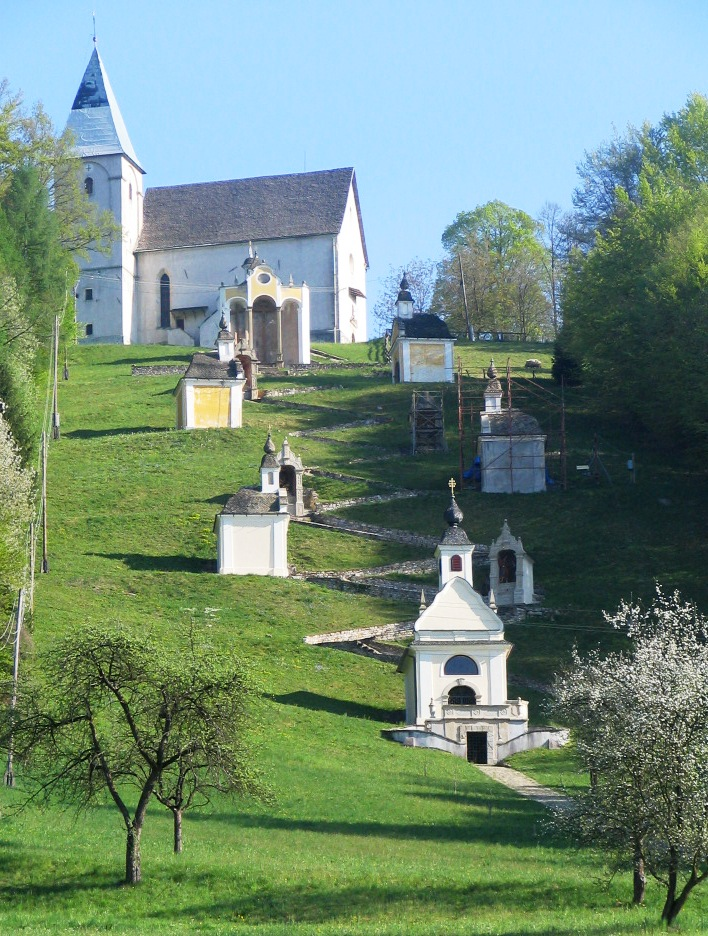
Series of chapels in Šmarje pri Jelšah and Saint Roch's Church in Predenca

The best-known landmark near the town is Saint Roch's Church in the settlement of Predenca south of the town and the series of chapels representing Calvary and the Stations of the Cross on the path leading up to the church from the town.
