= Temenica =

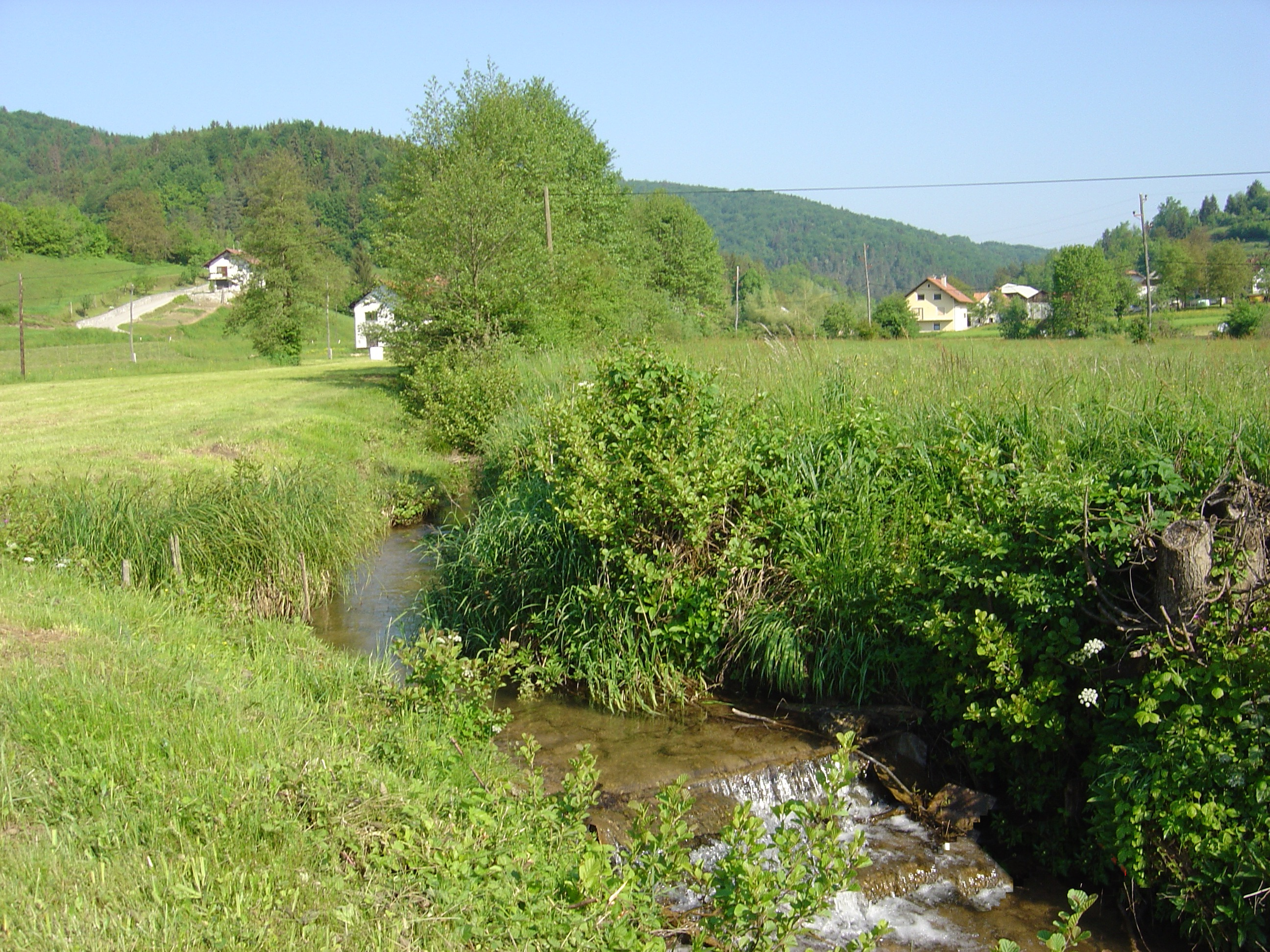
- The upper course of the Temenica, at Sobrače

Location
- Country: Slovenia

Physical characteristics
- Mouth
  - location: Krka
  - coordinates: 45.7942°N 15.1241°E
- Length: 27 km (17 mi)
- Basin size: 103 km^{2} (40 sq mi)

Basin features
- Progression: Krka→ Sava→ Danube→ Black Sea

The Temenica is a river in Slovenia. It is one of the most typical influent streams of Slovenia's karst terrain.

== Name ==
The name Temenica comes from the archaic common noun *temenica 'spring' (cf. Polish dialect ciemienica 'spring', Czech temenec 'spring').

== Geography ==
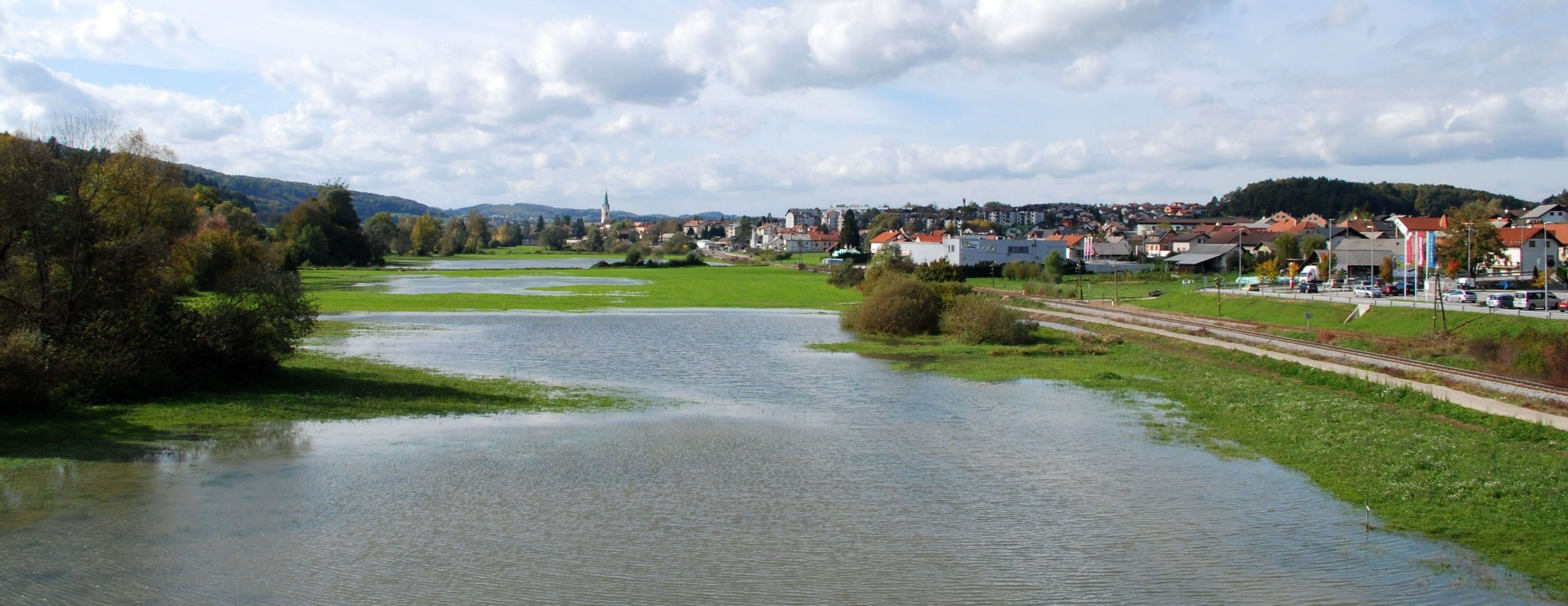
The Temenica floodplain at Trebnje

The river goes under the surface twice. It originates in the southern part of the Sava Hills. It sinks for the first time near Dolenje Ponikve in several sinkholes. It emerges again in the Mirna Peč Valley at Zijalo Spring. It runs above ground until a sinkhole near Goriška Vas, where it sinks for the second and last time. The third and last spring of the Temenica is located at Luknja pri Prečni. It flows through the Zalog Karst Field and it joins with the Krka River as its largest tributary.

The Temenica's surface length is 27 kilometres (17 mi), and its subterranean length is 1.75 kilometres (1.09 mi) measured in a straight line.
