= Mirna Peč =

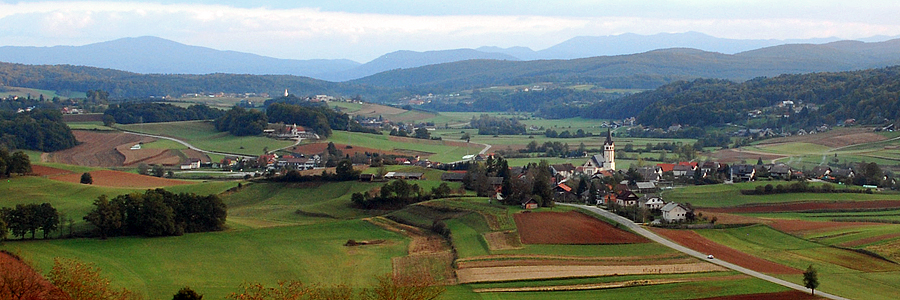

- Location in Slovenia
- Coordinates: 45°51′28.71″N 15°5′15.21″E
- Country: Slovenia
- Traditional region: Lower Carniola
- Statistical region: Southeast Slovenia
- Municipality: Mirna Peč

Area
  - Total: 6.5 km^{2} (2.5 sq mi)
- Elevation: 233 m (764 ft)

Population (2013)
  - Total: 1,015

Mirna Peč (pronounced [ˈmiːɾna ˈpeːtʃ]; German: Hönigstein) is a rural settlement in southeast Slovenia. It is the seat of the Municipality of Mirna Peč.

== Geography ==
Mirna Peč is located about 10 km northwest of Novo Mesto, the cultural and administrative centre of the traditional region of Lower Carniola, in the heart of the Temenica Valley. Mirna Peč consists of 16 streets: Brezence, Borovje, Češence, Industrijska cesta, Ivanja Vas, Marof, Na hirb, Ob avtocesti, Postja, Prisojna Pot, Rogovila, Rožna Ulica, Šranga, Trg, and Vihre.

== Culture ==
The Mirna Peč parish church of Saint Cantianius is part of the Roman Catholic Diocese of Novo Mesto. It was built in 1915 on the site of a 15th-century predecessor.

== Notable people ==
Notable people that were born or lived in Mirna Peč include:

- Anton Bartel (1853–1938), lexicographer
- Franc Dular (1860–1924), veterinarian
- Karel Javoršek (1873–1916), composer
- Ivan Kovačič (a.k.a. Efenka) (1921–1963), Partisan and People's Hero of Yugoslavia
- Stane Potočar (a.k.a. Lakar) (1919–1997), Partisan and People's Hero of Yugoslavia
- Mara Rupena (a.k.a. Osolnik) (1918–2003), Partisan and editor
- Zora Rupena (a.k.a. Katja) (1920–1945), Partisan
- Lojze Slak (1932–2011), musician
- Ludvik Starič (1906–1989), motorcyclist
- Albert Struna (1901–1982), engineer
