= List of cities, towns, and villages in Slovenia: V =

This is a list of cities, towns, and villages in Slovenia, starting with V.

| Settlement | Municipality |
|---|---|
| V Zideh | Lukovica |
| Vače | Litija |
| Vadarci | Puconci |
| Vadiče | Tržič |
| Vajgen | Pesnica |
| Valburga | Medvode |
| Vale | Komen |
| Valična Vas | Ivančna Gorica |
| Valterski Vrh | Škofja Loka |
| Vanča Vas | Tišina (občina) |
| Vaneča | Puconci |
| Vanetina | Cerkvenjak |
| Vanganel | Koper |
| Varda | Lenart |
| Vareja | Videm |
| Vareje | Divača |
| Varoš | Slovenska Bistrica |
| Varpolje | Mozirje |
| Vas | Kostel |
| Vas | Radlje ob Dravi |
| Vaseno | Kamnik |
| Vašca | Cerklje na Gorenjskem |
| Vaše | Medvode |
| Vatovlje | Divača |
| Vavpča Vas pri Dobrniču | Trebnje |
| Vavpča Vas | Semič |
| Vavta Vas | Novo Mesto |
| Večeslavci | Rogašovci |
| Večje Brdo | Dobje |
| Večkoti | Komen |
| Vedrijan | Brda |
| Vejice | Šentjur |
| Velenje | Velenje |
| Velesovo | Cerklje na Gorenjskem |
| Veličane | Ormož |
| Velika Brda | Postojna |
| Velika Bukovica | Ilirska Bistrica |
| Velika Dobrava | Ivančna Gorica |
| Velika Dolina | Brežice |
| Velika Goba | Litija |
| Velika Hubajnica | Sevnica |
| Velika Ilova Gora | Grosuplje |
| Velika Kostrevnica | Litija |
| Velika Lahinja | Črnomelj |
| Velika Lašna | Kamnik |
| Velika Ligojna | Vrhnika |
| Velika Loka | Grosuplje |
| Velika Loka | Trebnje |
| Velika Nedelja | Ormož |
| Velika Pirešica | Žalec |
| Velika Planina | Kamnik |
| Velika Polana | Velika Polana |
| Velika Preska | Litija |
| Velika Pristava | Pivka |
| Velika Račna | Grosuplje |
| Velika Raven | Vojnik |
| Velika Sela | Črnomelj |
| Velika Slevica | Velike Lašče |
| Velika Stara Vas | Grosuplje |
| Velika Strmica | Trebnje |
| Velika Ševnica | Trebnje |
| Velika Štanga | Litija |
| Velika Varnica | Videm |
| Velika Vas pri Krškem | Krško |
| Velika Vas | Moravče |
| Velike Bloke | Bloke |
| Velike Brusnice | Novo Mesto |
| Velike Češnjice | Ivančna Gorica |
| Velike Dole pri Temenici | Ivančna Gorica |
| Velike Dole | Trebnje |
| Velike Gorelce | Laško |
| Velike Grahovše | Laško |
| Velike Kompolje | Ivančna Gorica |
| Velike Lašče | Velike Lašče |
| Velike Lese | Ivančna Gorica |
| Velike Lipljene | Grosuplje |
| Velike Loče | Hrpelje-Kozina |
| Velike Malence | Brežice |
| Velike Pece | Ivančna Gorica |
| Velike Poljane | Ribnica |
| Velike Poljane | Škocjan |
| Velike Rebrce | Ivančna Gorica |
| Velike Rodne | Rogaška Slatina |
| Velike Vodenice | Krško |
| Velike Vrhe | Ivančna Gorica |
| Velike Žablje | Ajdovščina |
| Veliki Ban | Šentjernej |
| Veliki Boč | Selnica ob Dravi |
| Veliki Brebrovnik | Ormož |
| Veliki Cerovec | Novo Mesto |
| Veliki Cirnik | Sevnica |
| Veliki Dol | Krško |
| Veliki Dol | Sežana |
| Veliki Gaber | Trebnje |
| Veliki Hrib | Kamnik |
| Veliki Jelnik | Lukovica |
| Veliki Kal | Ivančna Gorica |
| Veliki Kal | Mirna Peč |
| Veliki Kamen | Krško |
| Veliki Koren | Krško |
| Veliki Korinj | Ivančna Gorica |
| Veliki Lipoglav | Ljubljana |
| Veliki Lipovec | Žužemberk |
| Veliki Ločnik | Velike Lašče |
| Veliki Nerajec | Črnomelj |
| Veliki Obrež | Brežice |
| Veliki Okič | Videm |
| Veliki Orehek | Novo Mesto |
| Veliki Osolnik | Velike Lašče |
| Veliki Otok | Postojna |
| Veliki Podljuben | Novo Mesto |
| Veliki Podlog | Krško |
| Veliki Rakitovec | Kamnik |
| Veliki Rigelj | Dolenjske Toplice |
| Veliki Slatnik | Novo Mesto |
| Veliki Trn | Krško |
| Veliki Videm | Trebnje |
| Veliki Vrh pri Litiji | Litija |
| Veliki Vrh pri Šmarju | Grosuplje |
| Veliki Vrh | Bloke |
| Veliki Vrh | Gorišnica |
| Veliki Vrh | Šmartno ob Paki |
| Veliko Brdo | Ilirska Bistrica |
| Veliko Črnelo | Ivančna Gorica |
| Veliko Globoko | Ivančna Gorica |
| Veliko Lipje | Žužemberk |
| Veliko Mlačevo | Grosuplje |
| Veliko Mraševo | Krško |
| Veliko Polje | Sežana |
| Veliko Širje | Laško |
| Veliko Tinje | Slovenska Bistrica |
| Veliko Trebeljevo | Ljubljana |
| Veliko Ubeljsko | Postojna |
| Velka | Dravograd |
| Veniše | Krško |
| Verače | Podčetrtek |
| Verd | Vrhnika |
| Verdun pri Uršnih Selih | Dolenjske Toplice |
| Verdun | Novo Mesto |
| Verje | Medvode |
| Vernek | Litija |
| Verpete | Vojnik |
| Veržej | Veržej |
| Vesca | Vodice |
| Vesela Gora | Trebnje |
| Veščica | Murska Sobota |
| Veščica | Razkrižje |
| Vešenik | Slovenske Konjice |
| Vešter | Škofja Loka |
| Vetrnik | Kozje |
| Vezovje | Šentjur |
| Vič | Dravograd |
| Vičanci | Ormož |
| Vidanovci | Ljutomer |
| Videm pri Lukovici | Lukovica |
| Videm pri Ptuju | Videm |
| Videm pri Temenici | Ivančna Gorica |
| Videm | Dobrepolje |
| Videm | Dol pri Ljubljani |
| Videm | Krško |
| Videž | Slovenska Bistrica |
| Vidonci | Grad |
| Vidošiči | Metlika |
| Vidovica | Podčetrtek |
| Vidrga | Zagorje ob Savi |
| Vihre | Krško |
| Vikrče | Medvode |
| Vimolj pri Predgradu | Kočevje |
| Vimolj | Kostel |
| Vinarje | Maribor |
| Vinarje | Slovenska Bistrica |
| Vincarje | Škofja Loka |
| Vine | Vojnik |
| Vine | Zagorje ob Savi |
| Vinec | Rogaška Slatina |
| Vinharje | Gorenja Vas–Poljane |
| Vinica pri Šmarjeti | Novo Mesto |
| Vinica | Črnomelj |
| Vinice | Sodražica |
| Vinička Vas | Lenart |
| Vinja Vas | Novo Mesto |
| Vinje pri Moravčah | Moravče |
| Vinje | Dol pri Ljubljani |
| Vinji Vrh pri Semiču | Semič |
| Vinji Vrh | Brežice |
| Vinji Vrh | Litija |
| Vinji Vrh | Novo Mesto |
| Vinkov Vrh | Žužemberk |
| Vino | Grosuplje |
| Vinska Gora | Velenje |
| Vinska Gorica | Dobrna |
| Vinski Vrh pri Šmarju | Šmarje pri Jelšah |
| Vinski Vrh | Ormož |
| Vintarjevec | Litija |
| Vintarji | Ribnica |
| Vintarovci | Destrnik |
| Vipava | Vipava |
| Vipavski Križ | Ajdovščina |
| Vipolže | Brda |
| Vir pri Nevljah | Kamnik |
| Vir pri Stični | Ivančna Gorica |
| Vir | Domžale |
| Virlog | Škofja Loka |
| Virmaše | Škofja Loka |
| Virštanj | Podčetrtek |
| Visejec | Žužemberk |
| Visoče | Šentjur |
| Visoče | Tržič |
| Visoko pri Poljanah | Škofja Loka |
| Visoko | Ig |
| Visoko | Šenčur |
| Visole | Slovenska Bistrica |
| Višelnica | Bled |
| Viševca | Cerklje na Gorenjskem |
| Viševek | Loška Dolina |
| Višnja Gora | Ivančna Gorica |
| Višnja Vas | Vojnik |
| Višnje | Ajdovščina |
| Višnje | Ivančna Gorica |
| Višnjevik | Brda |
| Višnji Grm | Litija |
| Vitan | Ormož |
| Vitanje | Vitanje |
| Vitanjsko Skomarje | Vitanje |
| Vitna Vas | Brežice |
| Vitomarci | Sveti Andraž v Slov. Goricah |
| Vitovlje | Nova Gorica |
| Vizore | Vojnik |
| Vnajnarje | Ljubljana |
| Vnanje Gorice | Brezovica |
| Vodenovo | Šmarje pri Jelšah |
| Vodice nad Kamnikom | Kamnik |
| Vodice pri Gabrovki | Litija |
| Vodice pri Kalobju | Šentjur |
| Vodice pri Slivnici | Šentjur |
| Vodice | Ajdovščina |
| Vodice | Dobrepolje |
| Vodice | Vodice |
| Vodiško | Laško |
| Vodole | Maribor |
| Vodranci | Ormož |
| Vodriž | Slovenj Gradec |
| Vodruž | Šentjur |
| Voduce | Šentjur |
| Vodule | Šentjur |
| Voglajna | Šentjur |
| Voglarji | Nova Gorica |
| Voglje | Sežana |
| Voglje | Šenčur |
| Vogričevci | Ljutomer |
| Vogrsko | Nova Gorica |
| Vojna Vas | Črnomelj |
| Vojnik | Vojnik |
| Vojsko | Idrija |
| Vojsko | Kozje |
| Vojsko | Vodice |
| Vojščica | Miren-Kostanjevica |
| Voklo | Šenčur |
| Volaka | Gorenja Vas–Poljane |
| Volarje | Tolmin |
| Volavlje | Ljubljana |
| Volča | Gorenja Vas–Poljane |
| Volčanski Ruti | Tolmin |
| Volče | Pivka |
| Volče | Tolmin |
| Volčja Draga | Nova Gorica |
| Volčja Jama | Litija |
| Volčja Jama | Trebnje |
| Volčje Njive | Mirna |
| Volčje | Bloke |
| Volčje | Brežice |
| Volčji Grad | Komen |
| Volčji Potok | Kamnik |
| Volčkova Vas | Šentjernej |
| Volog | Nazarje |
| Vologa | Vransko |
| Volovnik | Krško |
| Vonarje | Podčetrtek |
| Vopovlje | Cerklje na Gorenjskem |
| Vosek | Pesnica |
| Vošce | Lukovica |
| Vošče | Radovljica |
| Vovše | Litija |
| Vrabče | Sežana |
| Vranja Peč | Kamnik |
| Vranje | Sevnica |
| Vranji Vrh | Šentilj |
| Vranke | Lukovica |
| Vranoviči | Črnomelj |
| Vransko | Vransko |
| Vrata | Dravograd |
| Vrata | Litija |
| Vratja Vas | Gornja Radgona |
| Vratji Vrh | Gornja Radgona |
| Vratno | Šentjernej |
| Vrba | Dobrna |
| Vrba | Lukovica |
| Vrba | Žirovnica |
| Vrbica | Ilirska Bistrica |
| Vrbičje | Grosuplje |
| Vrbina | Krško |
| Vrbje | Krško |
| Vrbje | Žalec |
| Vrbljene | Ig |
| Vrbnje | Radovljica |
| Vrbno | Šentjur |
| Vrbovce | Šentjernej |
| Vrbovec | Kočevje |
| Vrbovec | Trebnje |
| Vrbovo | Ilirska Bistrica |
| Vrčice | Semič |
| Vremski Britof | Divača |
| Vrenska Gorca | Kozje |
| Vrh nad Krašnjo | Lukovica |
| Vrh nad Laškim | Laško |
| Vrh nad Želimljami | Škofljica |
| Vrh pri Boštanju | Sevnica |
| Vrh pri Dolskem | Dol pri Ljubljani |
| Vrh pri Fari | Kostel |
| Vrh pri Hinjah | Žužemberk |
| Vrh pri Križu | Žužemberk |
| Vrh pri Ljubnu | Novo Mesto |
| Vrh pri Mlinšah | Zagorje ob Savi |
| Vrh pri Pahi | Novo Mesto |
| Vrh pri Poljanah | Ribnica |
| Vrh pri Površju | Krško |
| Vrh pri Sobračah | Ivančna Gorica |
| Vrh pri Šentjerneju | Šentjernej |
| Vrh pri Trebelnem | Trebnje |
| Vrh pri Višnji Gori | Ivančna Gorica |
| Vrh sv. Treh Kraljev | Logatec |
| Vrh | Loška Dolina |
| Vrh | Šmarje pri Jelšah |
| Vrh | Trebnje |
| Vrh | Velike Lašče |
| Vrh | Zagorje ob Savi |
| Vrhe - del | Trbovlje |
| Vrhe - del | Zagorje ob Savi |
| Vrhe | Celje |
| Vrhe | Novo Mesto |
| Vrhe | Slovenj Gradec |
| Vrhek | Sevnica |
| Vrhje | Brežice |
| Vrhloga | Slovenska Bistrica |
| Vrhnika pri Ložu | Loška Dolina |
| Vrhnika | Vrhnika |
| Vrhole pri Laporju | Slovenska Bistrica |
| Vrhole pri Slovenskih Konjicah | Slovenska Bistrica |
| Vrhov Dol | Maribor |
| Vrhovci | Črnomelj |
| Vrhovje | Cerklje na Gorenjskem |
| Vrhovlje pri Kojskem | Brda |
| Vrhovlje pri Kožbani | Brda |
| Vrhovlje | Lukovica |
| Vrhovlje | Sežana |
| Vrhovo pri Mirni Peči | Mirna Peč |
| Vrhovo pri Šentlovrencu | Trebnje |
| Vrhovo pri Žužemberku | Žužemberk |
| Vrhovo | Radeče |
| Vrhovska Vas | Brežice |
| Vrhpeč | Mirna Peč |
| Vrhpolje pri Kamniku | Kamnik |
| Vrhpolje pri Moravčah | Moravče |
| Vrhpolje pri Šentvidu | Ivančna Gorica |
| Vrhpolje | Hrpelje-Kozina |
| Vrhpolje | Vipava |
| Vrhtrebnje | Trebnje |
| Vrhulje | Krško |
| Vrsno | Kobarid |
| Vršna Vas | Šmarje pri Jelšah |
| Vršnik | Kungota |
| Vrt | Kočevje |
| Vrtača pri Semiču | Semič |
| Vrtača | Krško |
| Vrtače | Trebnje |
| Vrtoče | Miren-Kostanjevica |
| Vrtojba | Šempeter-Vrtojba |
| Vrtovče | Ajdovščina |
| Vrtovin | Ajdovščina |
| Vrzdenec | Horjul |
| Vučja Gomila | Moravske Toplice |
| Vučja Vas | Križevci |
| Vuhred | Radlje ob Dravi |
| Vukovci | Črnomelj |
| Vukovje | Pesnica |
| Vukovski Dol | Pesnica |
| Vukovski Vrh | Pesnica |
| Vurberk | Duplek |
| Vurmat - del | Podvelka |
| Vurmat - del | Selnica ob Dravi |
| Vuzenica | Vuzenica |
| Vuzmetinci | Ormož |
