= Vino =

== Computing ==
- Vino (operating system), an open-source operating system

== Locations ==
- Vino, Grosuplje, a village in the Municipality of Grosuplje, central Slovenia
- Cascada del Vino, a Venezuelan waterfall
- El Vino, a London wine bar and off licence

== People ==
- Vino G. Bastian (born 2003), Indonesian actor
- Vino Noharathalingam (born 1963), Sri Lankan politician
- Dr. Vino, pen name for American author and wine educator Tyler Colman
- Vino, nickname of Russian cyclist Alexander Vinokourov
- Vino, a character in the anime and manga series Zatch Bell!

== Other ==
- ViNO or Federation of Green Youth and Students, a Finnish organization
- Vino (album), a 2008 album by Dräco Rosa
- Vino 100, a North American franchise
- Yamaha Vino 125, a 2004 scooter
- VINO (Virgin Islands News Online), a news website in the British Virgin Islands
- Vino, a word for wine in some languages

== See also ==
- Mondovino, a 2004 American documentary film
- Vinoš Sofka (1929–2016), Czech museologist
- In vino veritas (disambiguation)
