= Šentjurje =

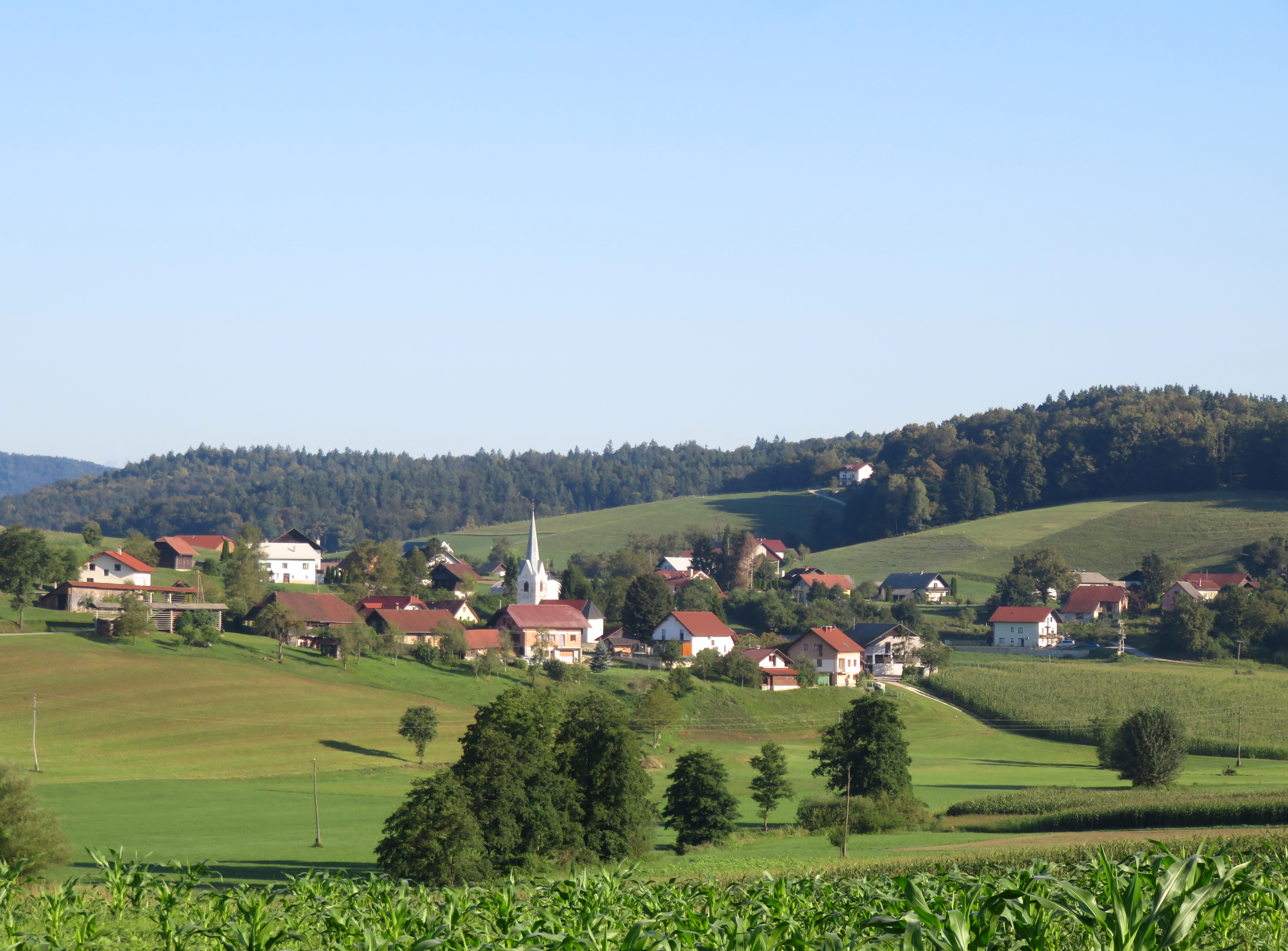

- Location in Slovenia
- Coordinates: 45°57′4″N 14°54′29.38″E
- Country: Slovenia
- Traditional region: Lower Carniola
- Statistical region: Central Slovenia
- Municipality: Ivančna Gorica

Area
  - Total: 0.63 km^{2} (0.24 sq mi)
- Elevation: 318.5 m (1,045 ft)

Population (2002)
  - Total: 71

Šentjurje (pronounced [ʃɛnˈtjuːɾjɛ] or [ʃənˈtjuːɾjɛ]; German: Sankt Georgen) is a small settlement to the east of Šentvid pri Stični in the Municipality of Ivančna Gorica in central Slovenia. The area is part of the historical region of Lower Carniola. The municipality is now included in the Central Slovenia Statistical Region.

== Church ==
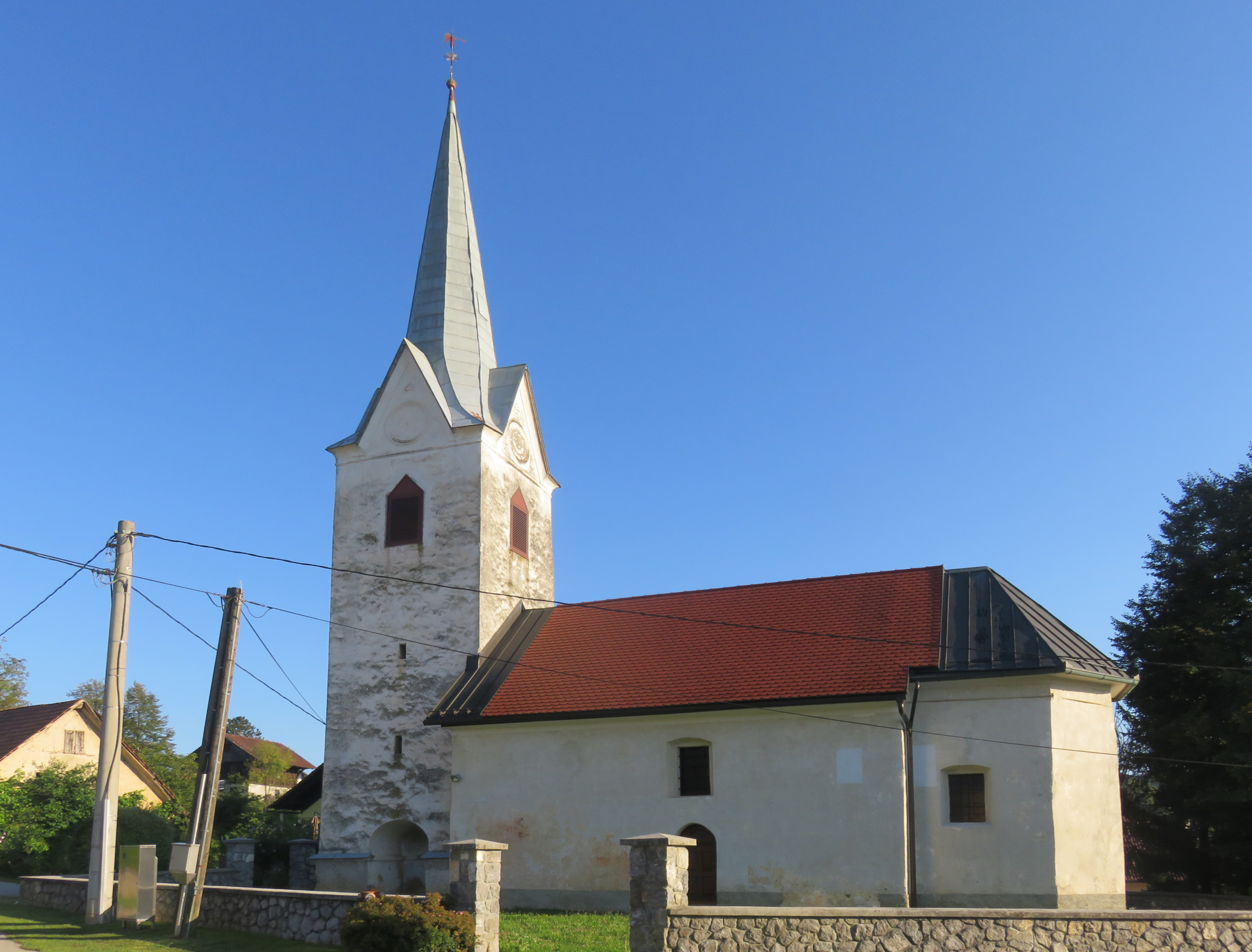
Saint George's Church

The local church from which the settlement gets its name is dedicated to Saint George (Slovene: sveti Jurij or colloquially Šentjur) and belongs to the Parish of Veliki Gaber. It dates to the early 16th century.
