= Podrečje =

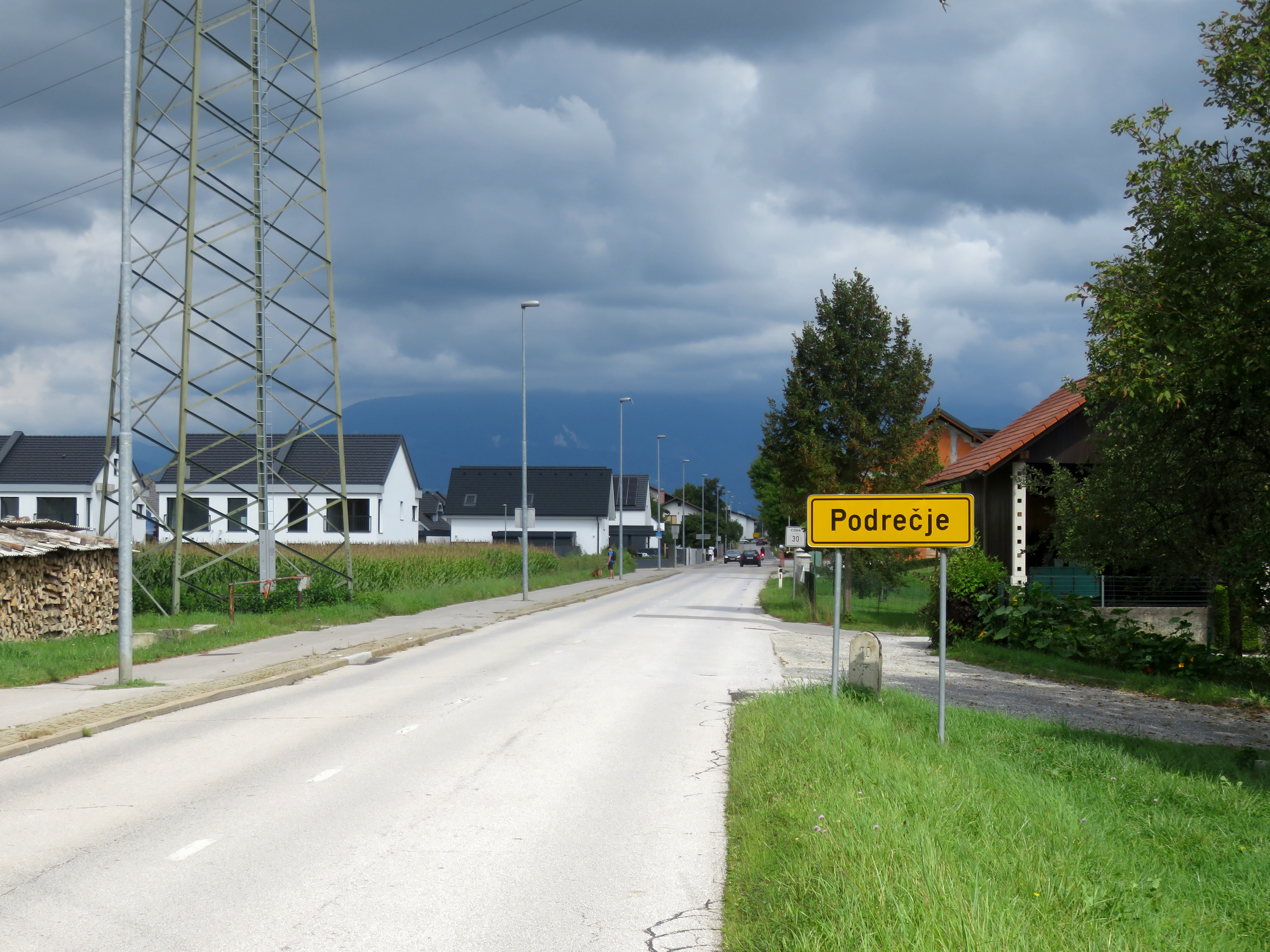

- Location in Slovenia
- Coordinates: 46°8′23.28″N 14°36′45.09″E
- Country: Slovenia
- Traditional region: Upper Carniola
- Statistical region: Central Slovenia
- Municipality: Domžale

Area
  - Total: 1.0 km^{2} (0.39 sq mi)
- Elevation: 304.3 m (998 ft)

Population (2020)
  - Total: 435
  - Density: 440/km^{2} (1,100/sq mi)

Podrečje (pronounced [pɔˈdɾeːtʃjɛ]; German: Podretsche) is a settlement on the left bank of the Kamnik Bistrica River opposite Domžale in the Upper Carniola region of Slovenia.

== Geography ==
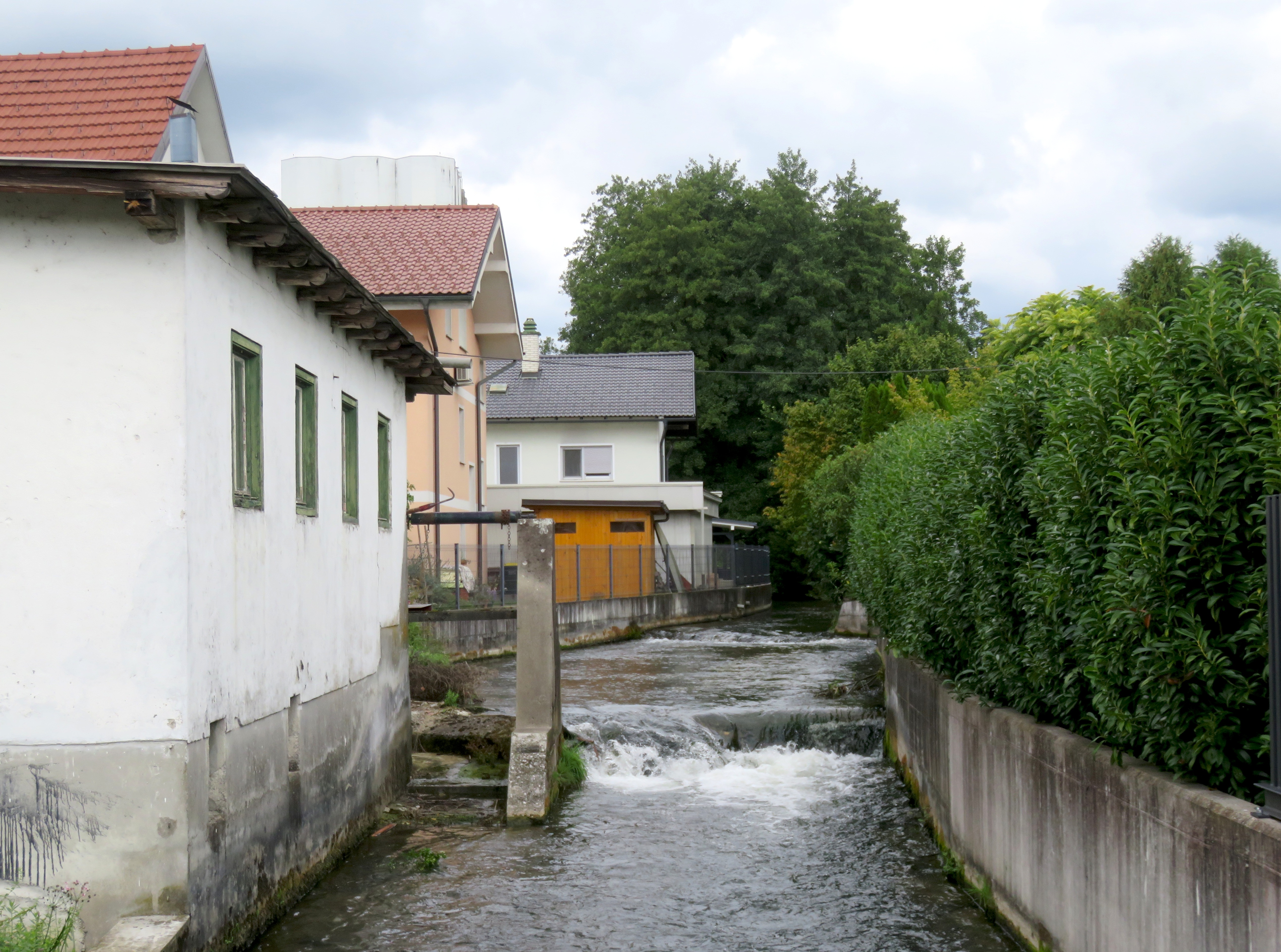
Mlinščica Creek in Podrečje

Podrečje is a scattered village bounded by the roads from Domžale to Vir and from Vir to Dol pri Ljubljani. The Rača River, a tributary of the Kamnik Bistrica, flows south of the settlement. Beyond the Rača, Šumberk Hill (elevation: 355 meters or 1,165 feet) rises to the southwest, and Tičnica Hill (elevation: 353 meters or 1,158 feet) to the southeast. The hamlet of Podšumberk stands below Šumberk Hill. Mlinščica Creek, a tributary of the Rača River, flows through the eastern part of the settlement. There are a few tilled fileds in the settlement. The terrain has a karst character; above the quarry near the bridge below Šumberk Hill there was Podrečje Cave (Podreška jama), now destroyed. Southwest of it are Long Cave (Dolga jama, also known as Big Cave Velika jama), and Bezjak Cave (Bezjakova jama) is located on Tičnica Hill.

== Name ==
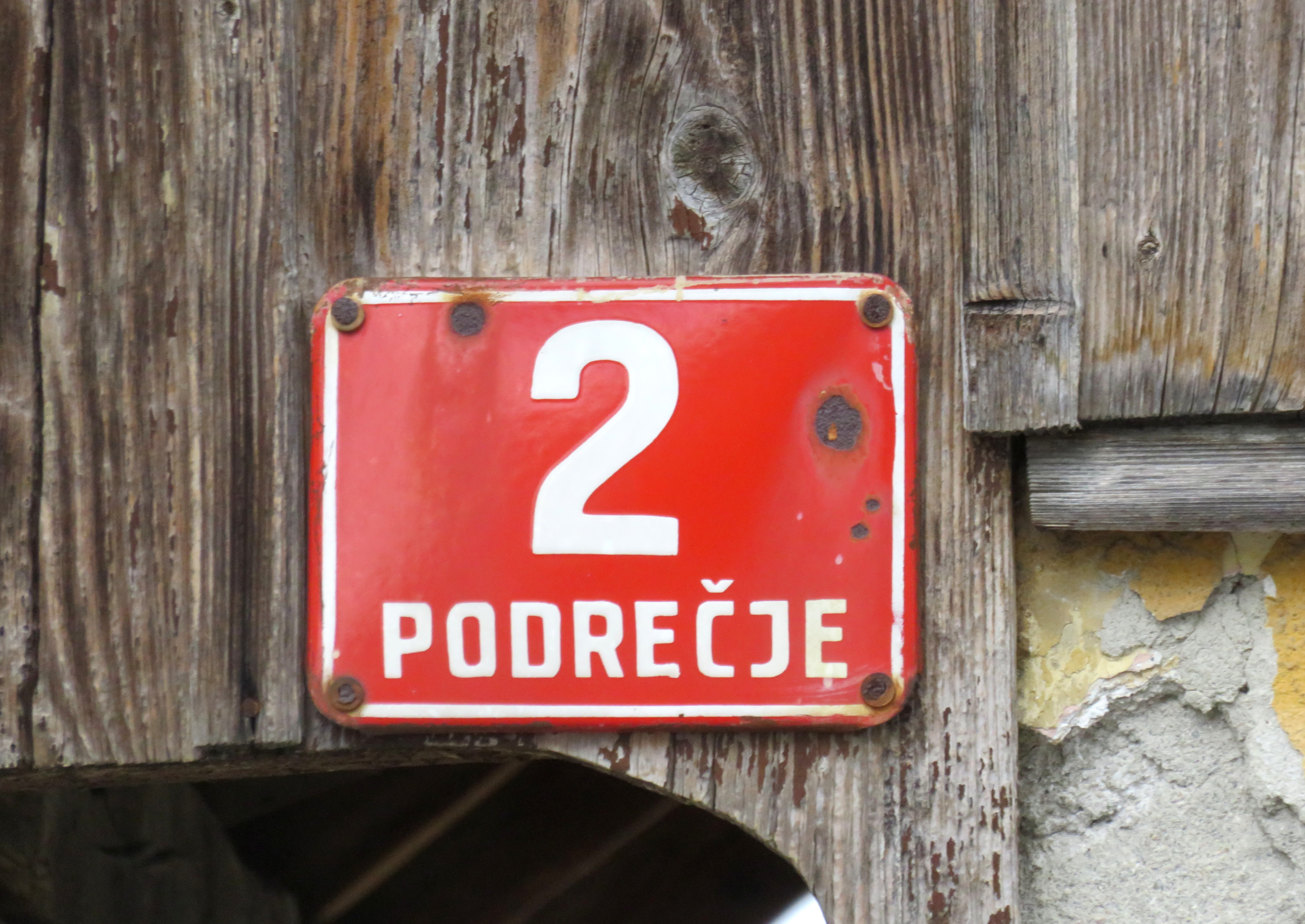
An address sign in Podrečje

Podrečje was attested in historical sources as Patriarchali villa in 1437 and Pattriarchsdorff in 1464. The original Slovene name can be reconstructed as *Podreča (vas) 'patriarch (village)', in which the first part is a possessive adjective from the common noun podreka 'patriarch' (from Vulgar Latin *padriaica). The name refers to ownership of the village in the Middle Ages by the Patriarchate of Aquileia.

== History ==
Various finds attest to prehistoric settlement in the area. In 1893, a stone axe was found on Šumberk Hill, and in 1953 a quartz scraper, parts of a quern, and animal teeth were found in the quarry. A bronze dagger was found in gravel about 100 meters (330 ft) south of the village in 1956 during excavation of the channel of the Kamnik Bistrica River.

During the Second World War, German forces executed five hostages on the bridge over the Kamnik Bistrica River on September 3, 1941. There was a Partisan checkpoint at the sawmill at the Kerč farm from 1942 to 1945. On September 20, 1944, Home Guard forces executed three communist agitators along the road from Vir to Ihan.

== Notable people ==
Notable people that were born or lived in Podrečje include the following:

- Jožef Virk (1810–1880), poet
