= Gombišče =

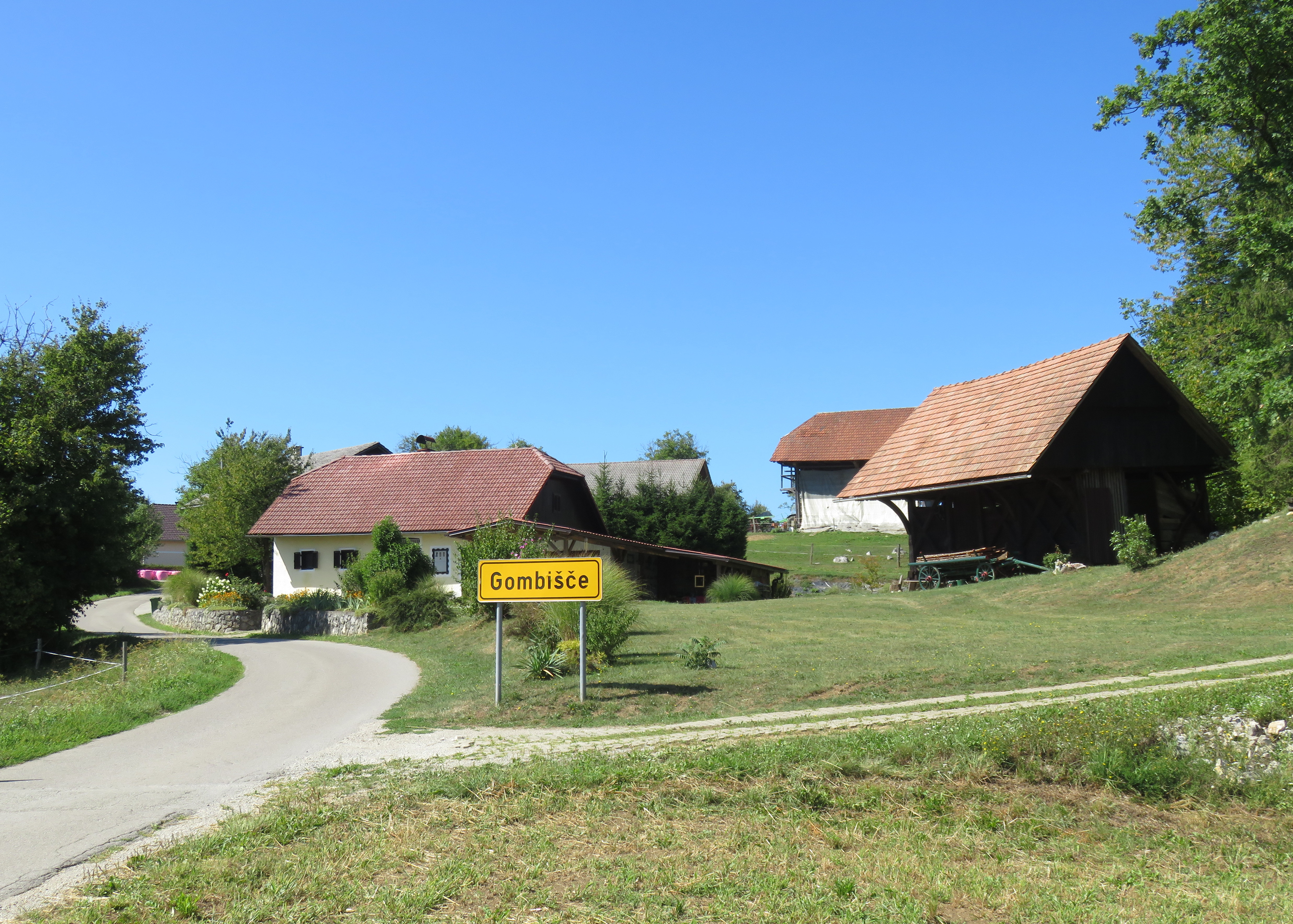

- Location in Slovenia
- Coordinates: 45°54′28.81″N 14°54′32.84″E
- Country: Slovenia
- Traditional region: Lower Carniola
- Statistical region: Southeast Slovenia
- Municipality: Trebnje

Area
  - Total: 1.41 km^{2} (0.54 sq mi)
- Elevation: 381.8 m (1,253 ft)

Population (2002)
  - Total: 25

Gombišče (pronounced [ɡɔmˈbiːʃtʃɛ]; in older sources also Gumbišče, German: Gumbische) is a small settlement in the Municipality of Trebnje in eastern Slovenia. The area is part of the historical region of Lower Carniola. The municipality is now included in the Southeast Slovenia Statistical Region. It includes the hamlet of Vrh (German: Werch).

== Church ==
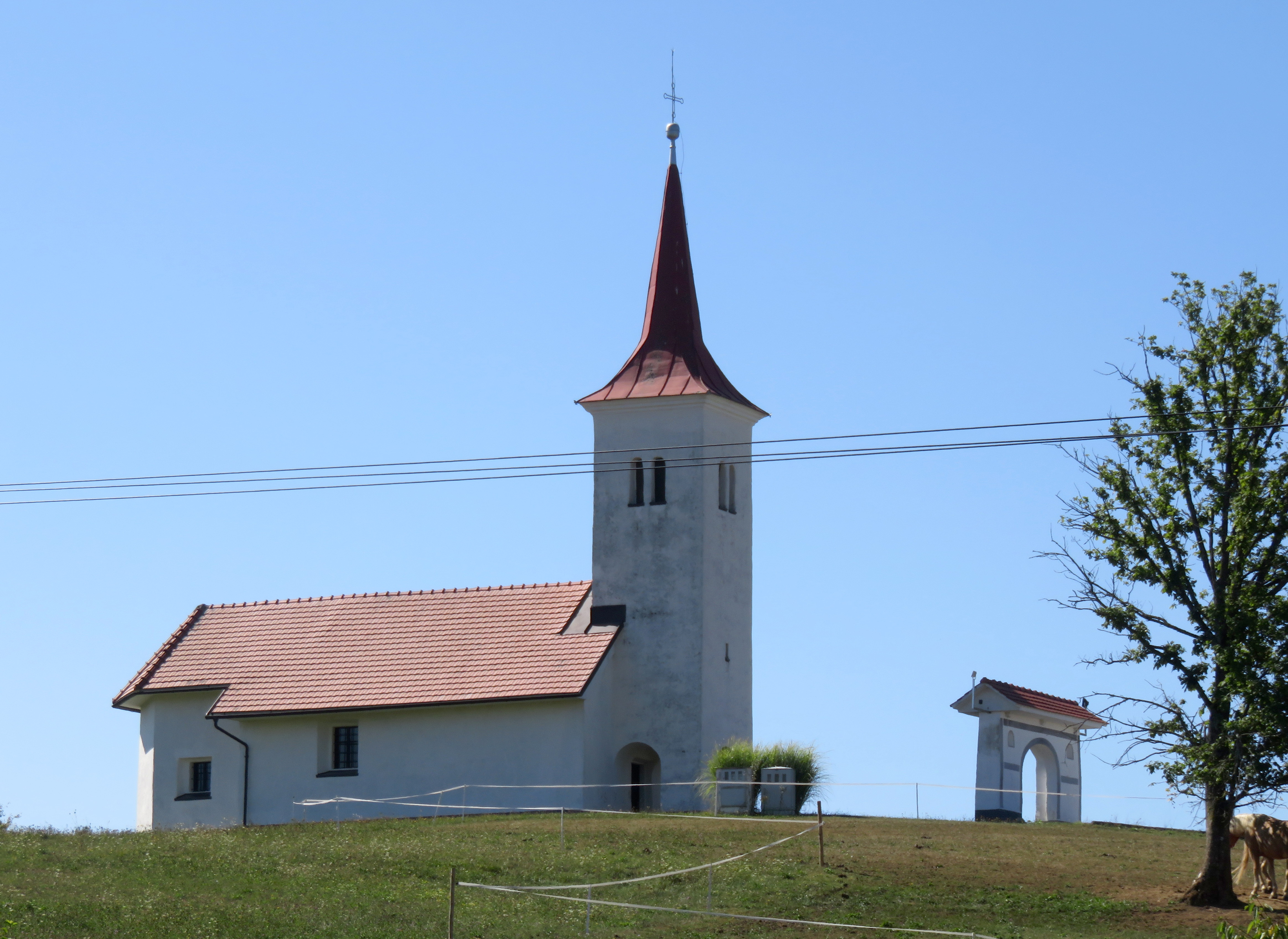
Saint Bartholomew's Church

The local church is dedicated to Saint Bartholomew (Slovene: sveti Jernej) and belongs to the Parish of Veliki Gaber. It is a Gothic building remodeled in the 17th century.
