= Podpeč pri Lukovici =

Podpeč Podpeč pri Lukovici (1953–1953)
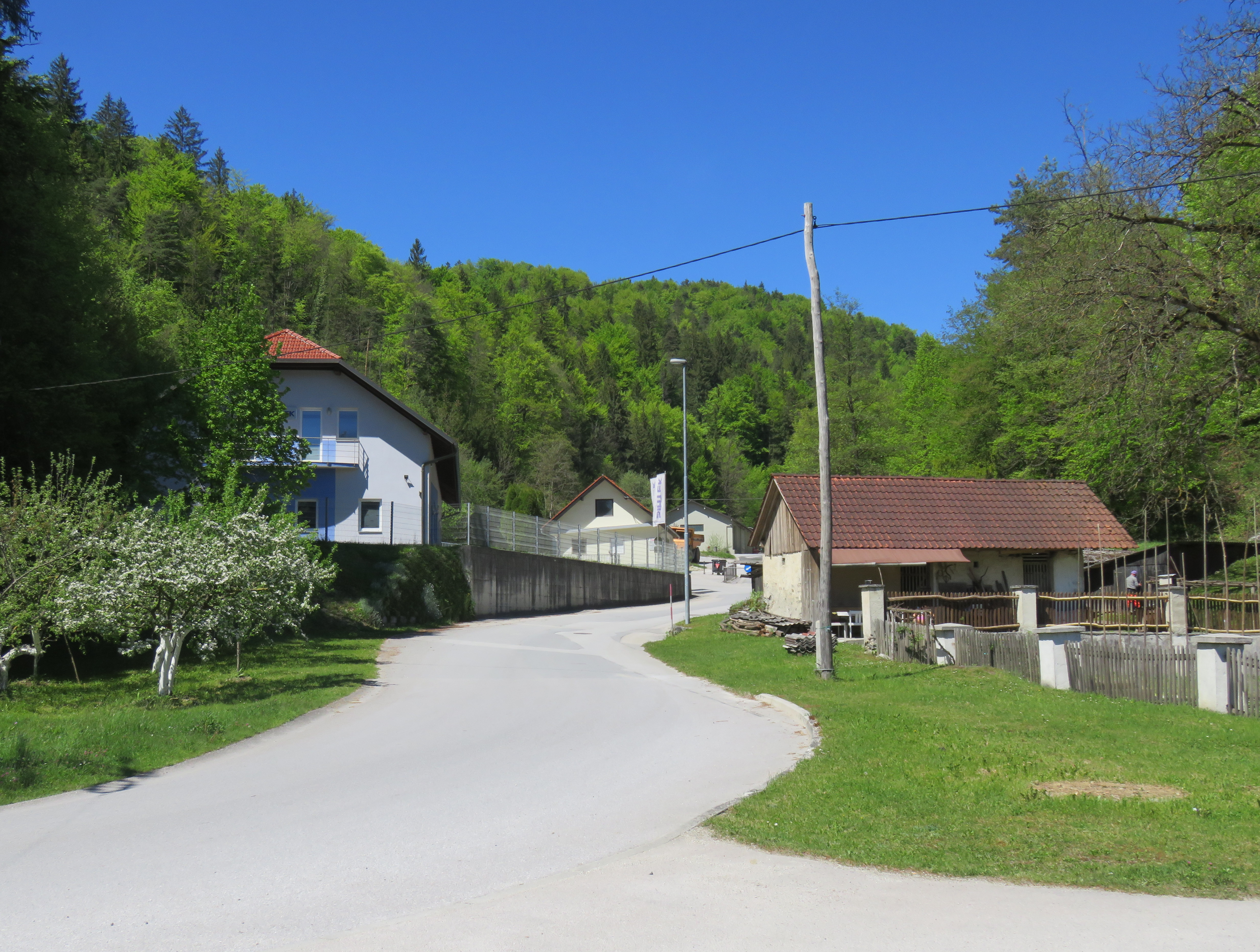

- Location in Slovenia
- Coordinates: 46°10′18″N 14°41′58″E
- Country: Slovenia
- Traditional region: Upper Carniola
- Statistical region: Central Slovenia
- Municipality: Lukovica
- Elevation: 338 m (1,109 ft)

Podpeč (pronounced [pɔtˈpeːtʃ], German: Podpetsch) is a former village in central Slovenia in the Municipality of Lukovica. It is now part of the village of Lukovica pri Domžalah. It is part of the traditional region of Upper Carniola and is now included in the Central Slovenia Statistical Region.

== Geography ==
Podpeč stands immediately east of the main part of Lukovica pri Domžalah, in the Radomlja Valley, also known as the Black Valley (Slovene: Črni graben).

== Name ==
The name Podpeč is shared by several settlements in Slovenia. It is a fused prepositional phrase that has lost case inflection, from pod 'under' + peč 'cliff', referring to the physical location of the village. The name of the village was changed from Podpeč to Podpeč pri Lukovici in 1953, simultaneously with its merger into the village of Lukovica (now Lukovica pri Domžalah).

== History ==
Traces of Hallstatt and La Tène settlement have been found at the quarry in Podpeč, attesting to its settlement in prehistoric times. It is hypothesized that the Roman way station Ad publicanos between Emona and Celeia was located at Podpeč.

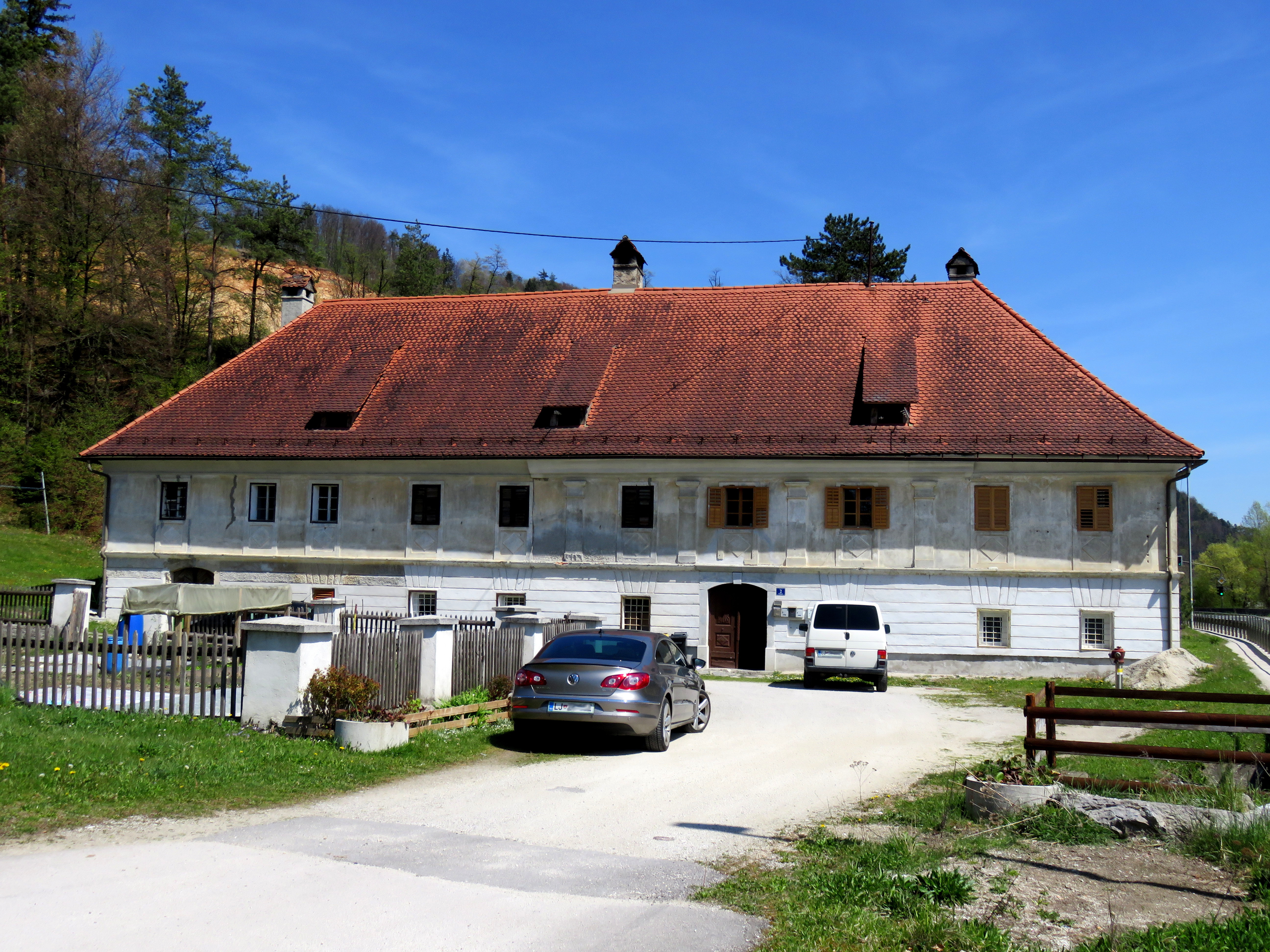
Former postal station in Podpeč

The modern settlement developed in connection with a postal station and toll station at the site. The first known leaseholder of the toll station was Andreas Sallitinger, recorded in 1538, and the postal station was established in 1573, when postal service was established between Graz and Ljubljana. The postal station and toll station were combined in 1585. During the 17th century, this was the only postal station in Upper Carniola, and within Carniola it was second in importance only to the postal station in Ljubljana. The toll services were relocated to Vir and Krašnja in 1809, and the postal service was relocated to Lukovica pri Domžalah in 1867.

Podpeč had a population of 52 (in nine houses) in 1880, and 45 (in eight houses) in 1900. Podpeč was annexed by Lukovica pri Domžalah in 1953, ending its existence as a separate settlement.
