= Vrh, Trebnje =

Vrh
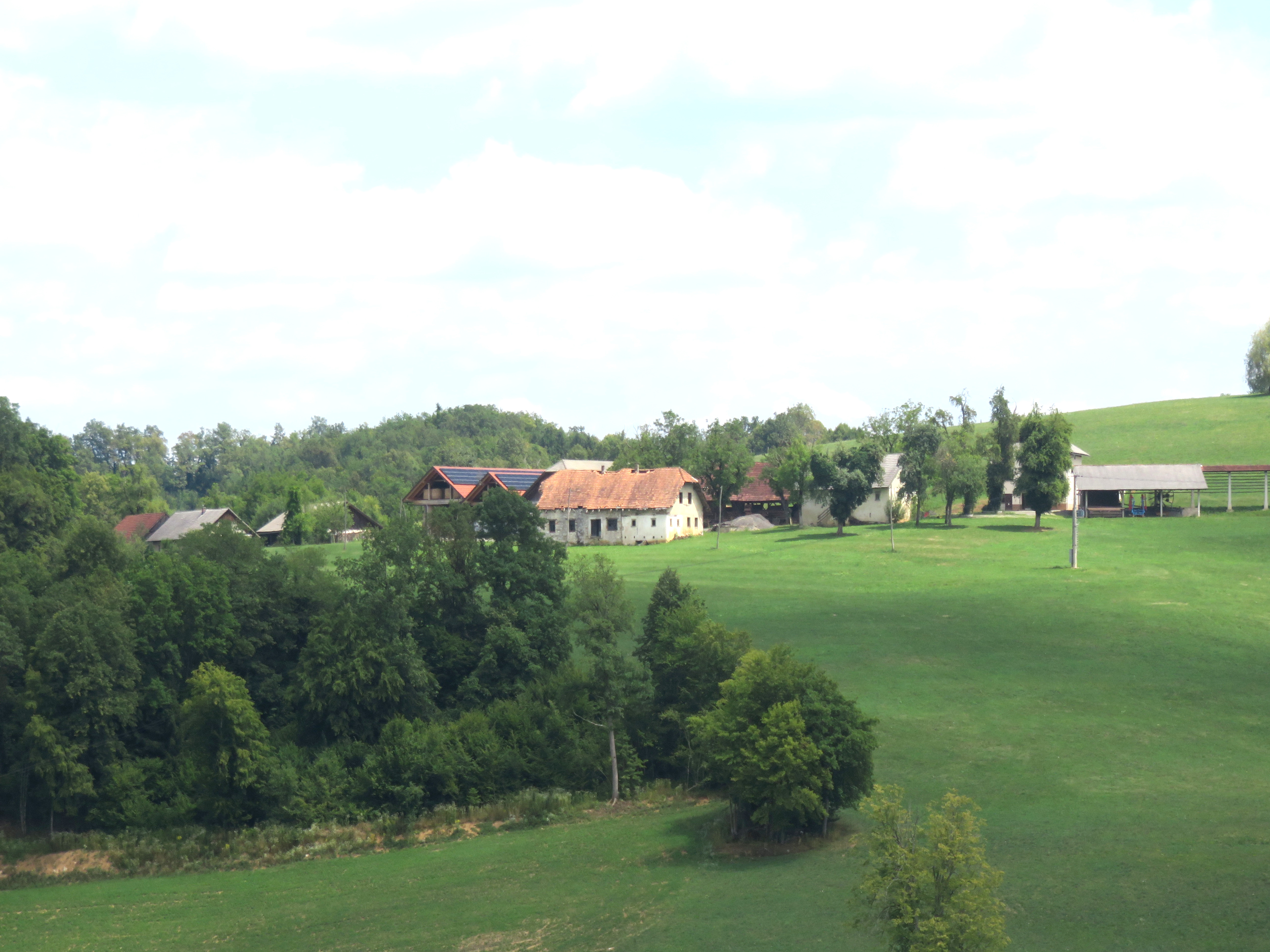

- Location in Slovenia
- Coordinates: 45°54′33″N 14°54′13″E
- Country: Slovenia
- Traditional region: Lower Carniola
- Statistical region: Southeast Slovenia
- Municipality: Trebnje
- Elevation: 370 m (1,210 ft)

Vrh (pronounced [ˈʋəɾx], in older sources Verh per Gumnišči, German: Werch (bei Gumbische)) is a former village in eastern Slovenia in the Municipality of Trebnje. It is now part of the village of Gombišče. It is part of the traditional region of Lower Carniola and is now included in the Southeast Slovenia Statistical Region.

== Geography ==
Vrh lies northwest of the village center of Gombišče, above a karst solution valley and the village of Velike Dole. Vrh Hill (elevation: 390.6 meters or 1,281 feet) rises just east of the houses in the settlement. Šmarnica Creek, which has its source at springs in neighboring Stehanja Vas, flows through the settlement and then to Velike Dole, where it disappears into the ground.

== Name ==
The name Vrh (from the common noun vrh 'peak') is common in Slovenia, referring to the local geography.

== History ==
Vrh was annexed by Gombišče in 1953, ending its existence as a separate settlement.
