= Volčja Jama, Trebnje =

Volčja Jama
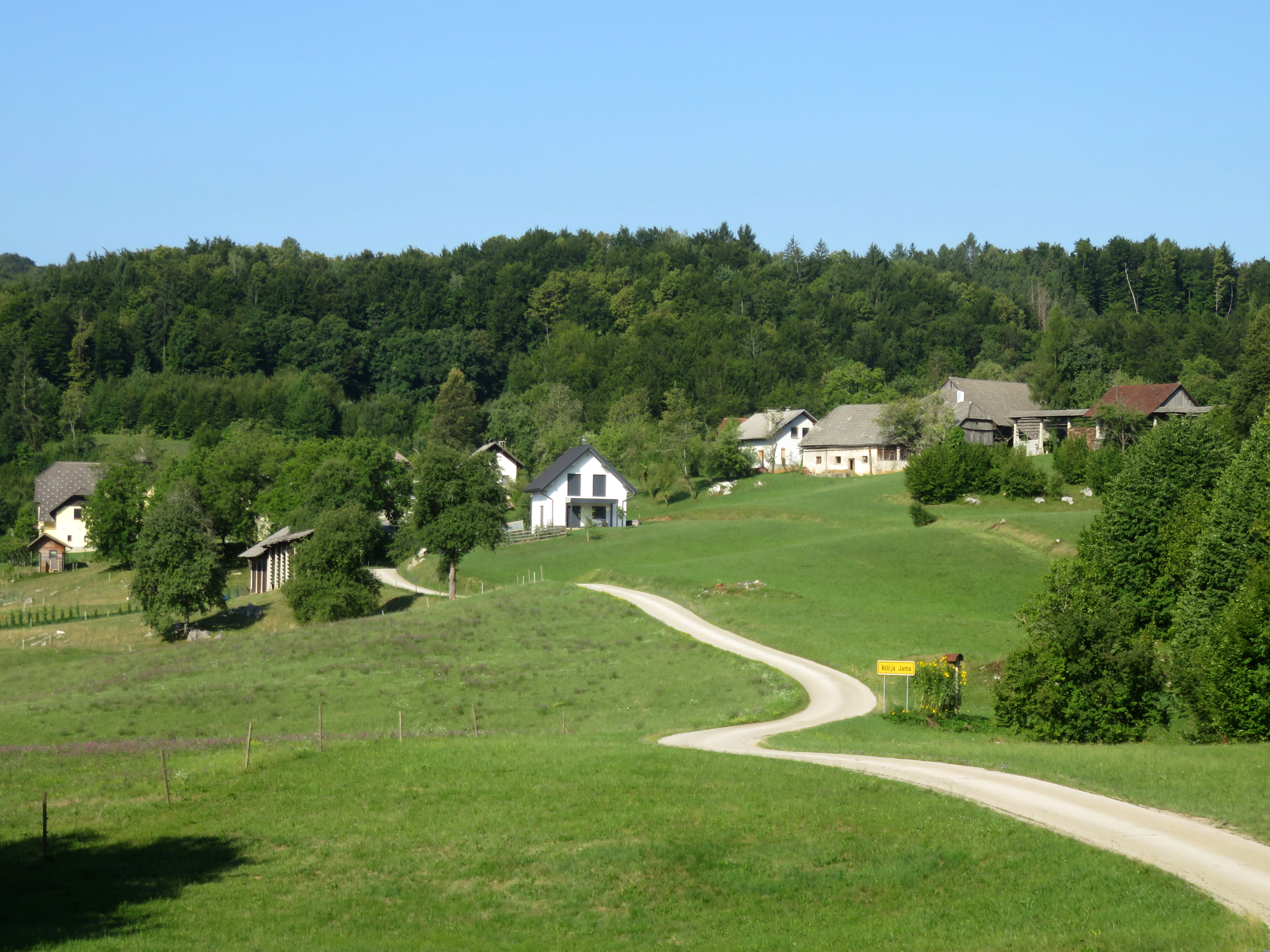

- Location in Slovenia
- Coordinates: 45°52′16.06″N 14°55′44.92″E
- Country: Slovenia
- Traditional region: Lower Carniola
- Statistical region: Southeast Slovenia
- Municipality: Trebnje

Area
  - Total: 1.32 km^{2} (0.51 sq mi)
- Elevation: 324.3 m (1,064 ft)

Population (2002)
  - Total: 18

Volčja Jama (pronounced [ˈʋoːu̯tʃja ˈjaːma]) is a small settlement in the Municipality of Trebnje in eastern Slovenia. It lies off the regional road leading north from Žužemberk to Zagorica pri Velikem Gabru. The area is part of the historical region of Lower Carniola. The municipality is now included in the Southeast Slovenia Statistical Region.
