= Stehanja Vas =

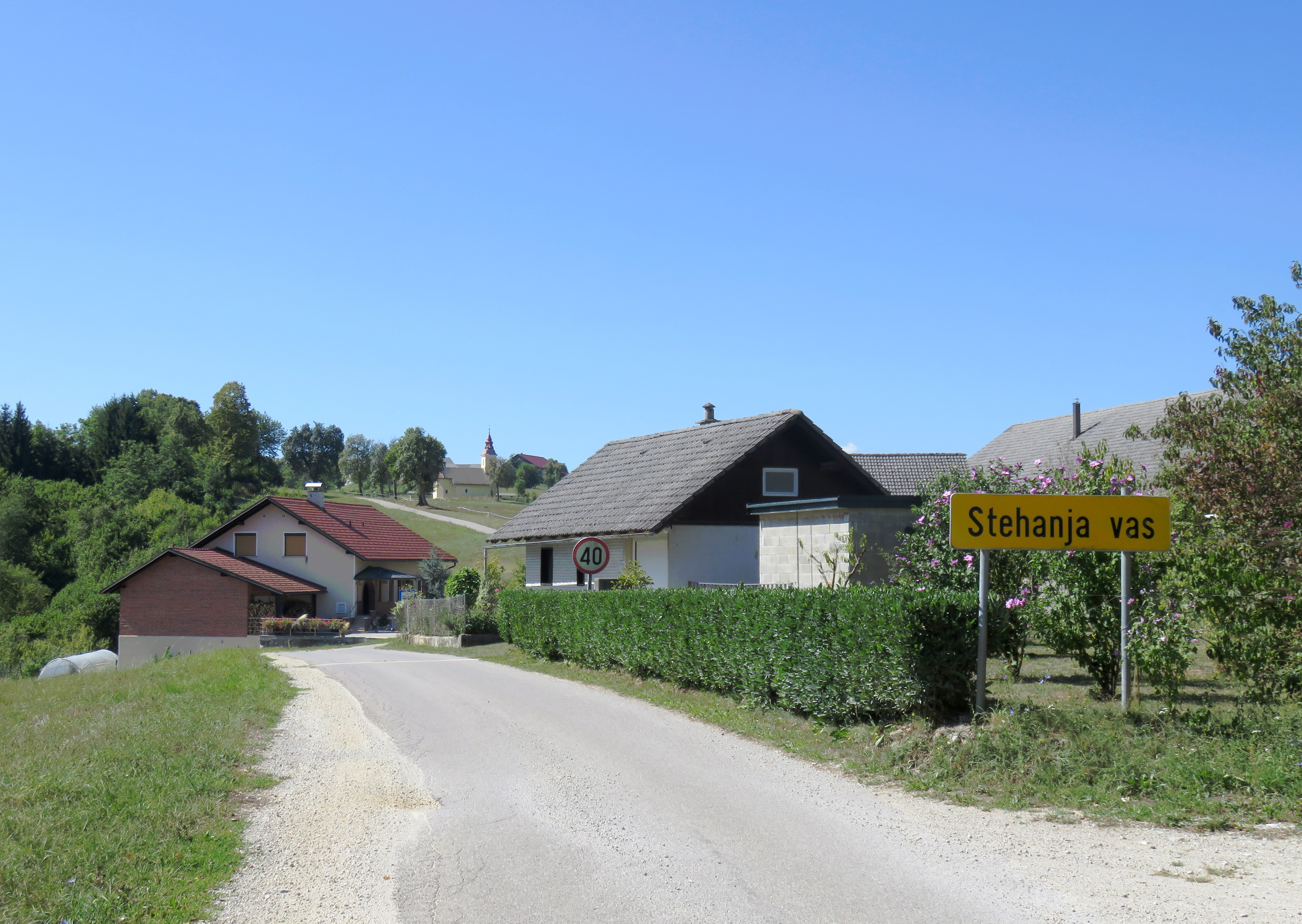

- Location in Slovenia
- Coordinates: 45°54′54.77″N 14°55′23.87″E
- Country: Slovenia
- Traditional region: Lower Carniola
- Statistical region: Southeast Slovenia
- Municipality: Trebnje

Area
  - Total: 2.49 km^{2} (0.96 sq mi)
- Elevation: 423.7 m (1,390 ft)

Population (2002)
  - Total: 44

Stehanja Vas (pronounced [stɛˈxaːnja ˈʋaːs]; Slovene: Stehanja vas, German: Stockendorf) is a small village in the Municipality of Trebnje in eastern Slovenia. It lies south of Veliki Gaber, south of the Slovenian A2 motorway. The area is part of the historical region of Lower Carniola. The municipality is now part of the Southeast Slovenia Statistical Region.

== Name ==
Stehanja Vas was attested in historical sources in 1228 as Stoychornsdorf, in 1406 as Stocheindorff, and in 1460 as Stochendarff. The name of the village comes from the nickname Stehan, a contraction of *Stojehan, thus meaning 'Stehan's village', referring to an early inhabitant of the settlement.

== Church ==
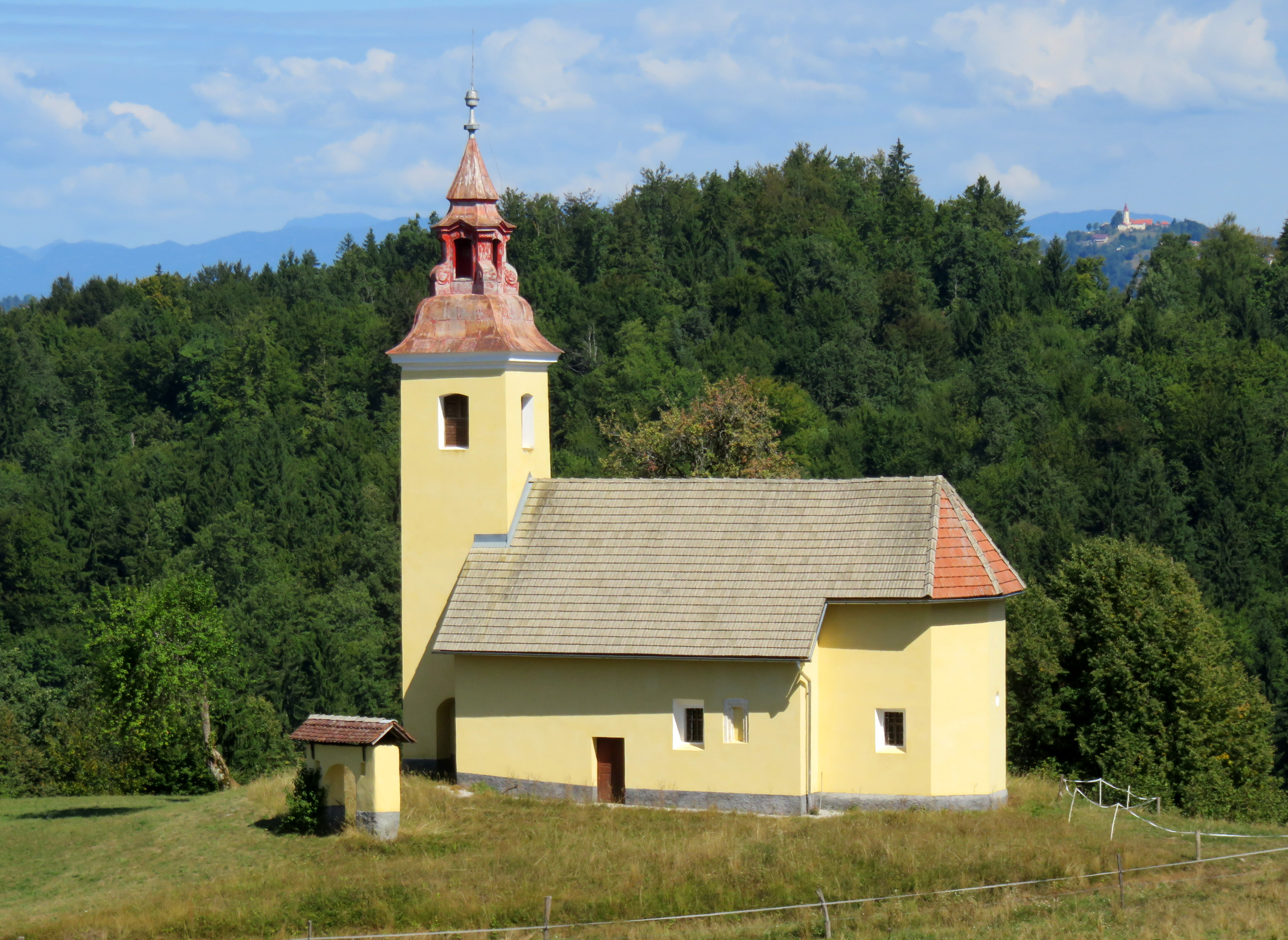
Holy Cross Church

The local church, built north of the village, is dedicated to the Exaltation of the Holy Cross and belongs to the Parish of Šentlovrenc. It is a well-preserved example of Gothic architecture dating to the mid-15th century with few alterations.
