= Volča =

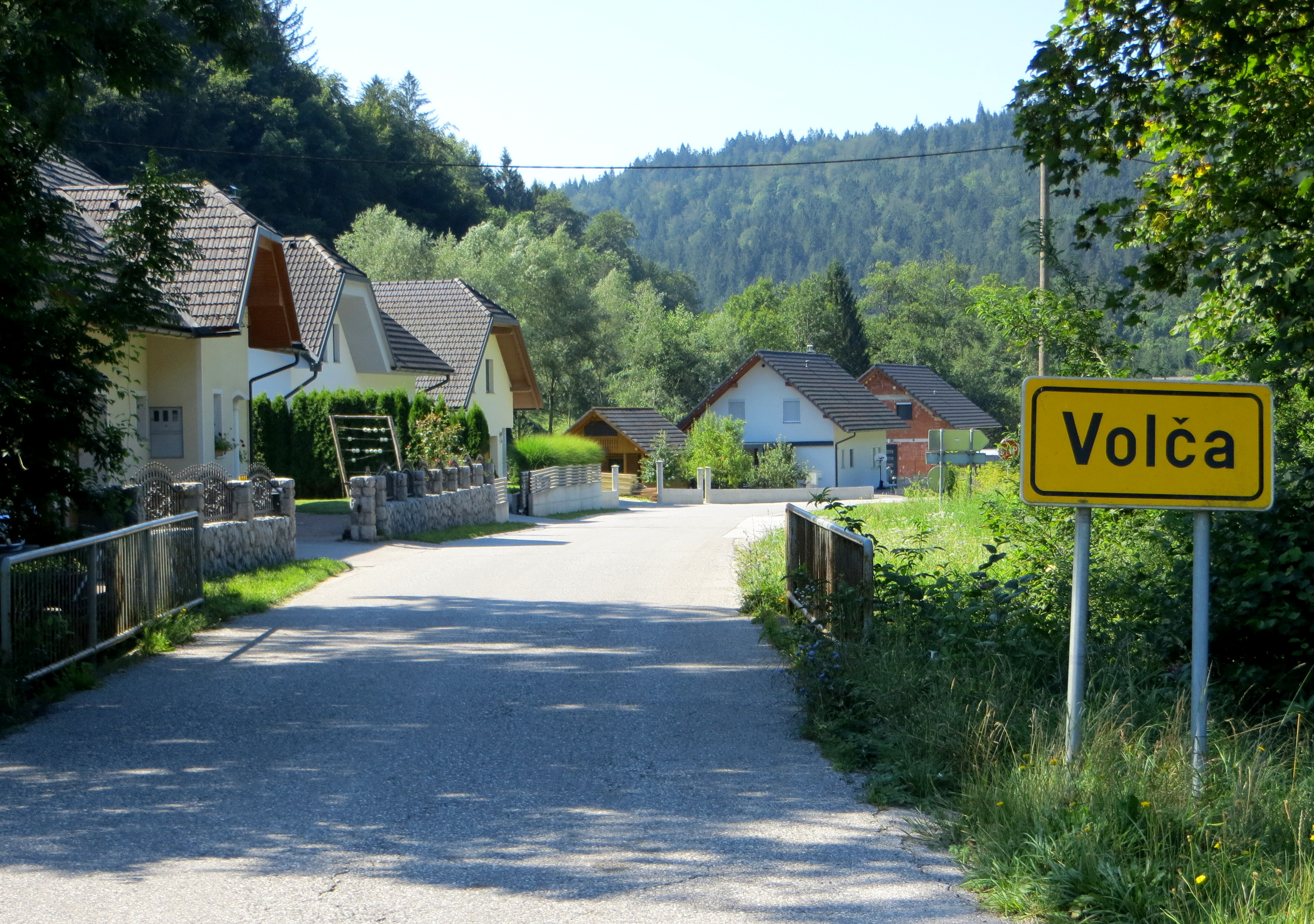

- Location in Slovenia
- Coordinates: 46°8′1.46″N 14°10′45.65″E
- Country: Slovenia
- Traditional region: Upper Carniola
- Statistical region: Upper Carniola
- Municipality: Gorenja Vas–Poljane

Area
  - Total: 2.34 km^{2} (0.90 sq mi)
- Elevation: 405.7 m (1,331 ft)

Population (2020)
  - Total: 120
  - Density: 51/km^{2} (130/sq mi)

Volča (pronounced [ˈʋoːu̯tʃa]; in older sources also Volče, German: Woutschach) is a village north of Poljane nad Škofjo Loko in the Municipality of Gorenja Vas–Poljane in the Upper Carniola region of Slovenia.

== Church ==
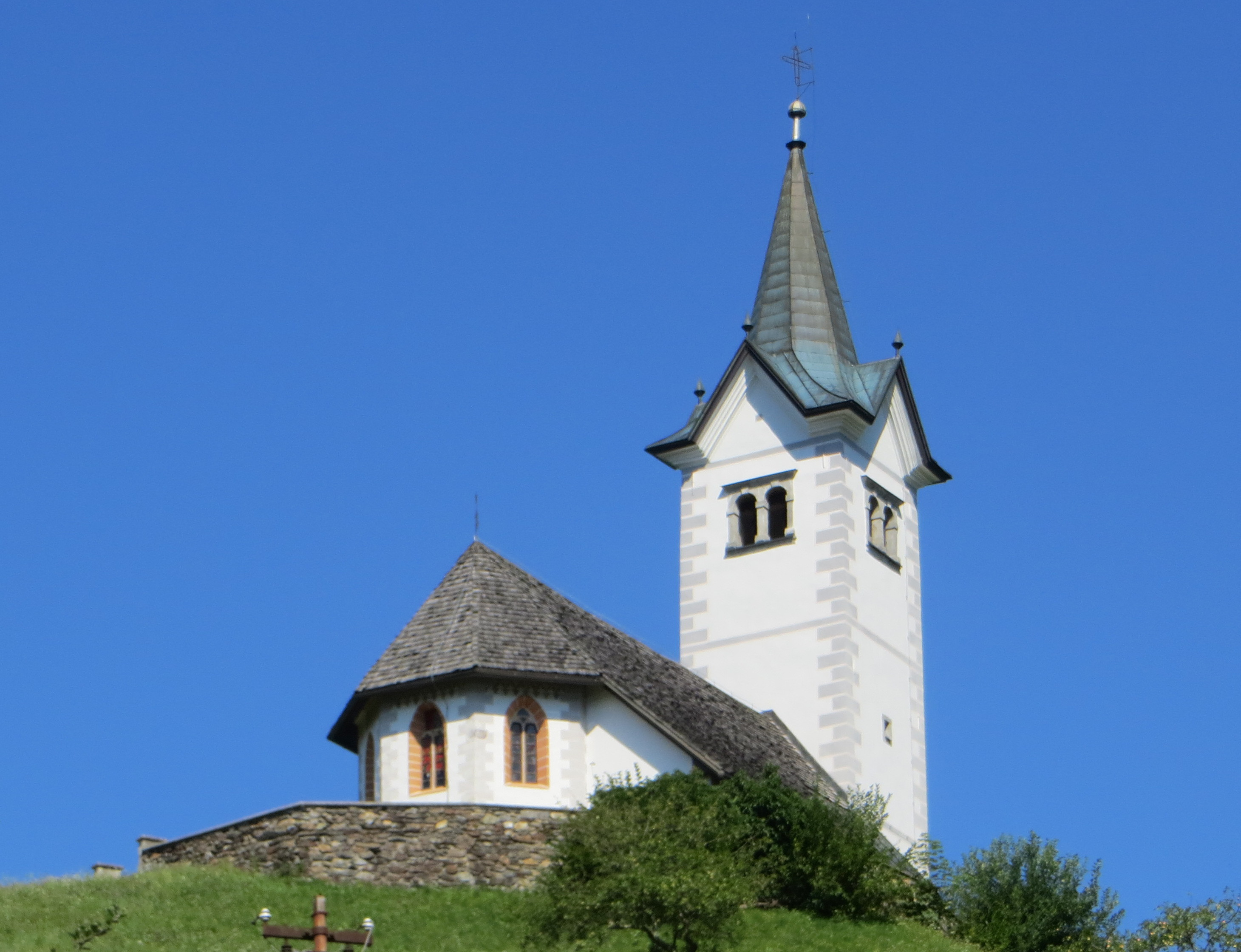
Saint George's Church

The local church is dedicated to Saint George and dates to the early 16th century. Sixteenth-century frescos are preserved in the sanctuary. The three altars in the church are all gilded and date to the mid-17th century.
