= Velika Loka, Grosuplje =

Velika Loka
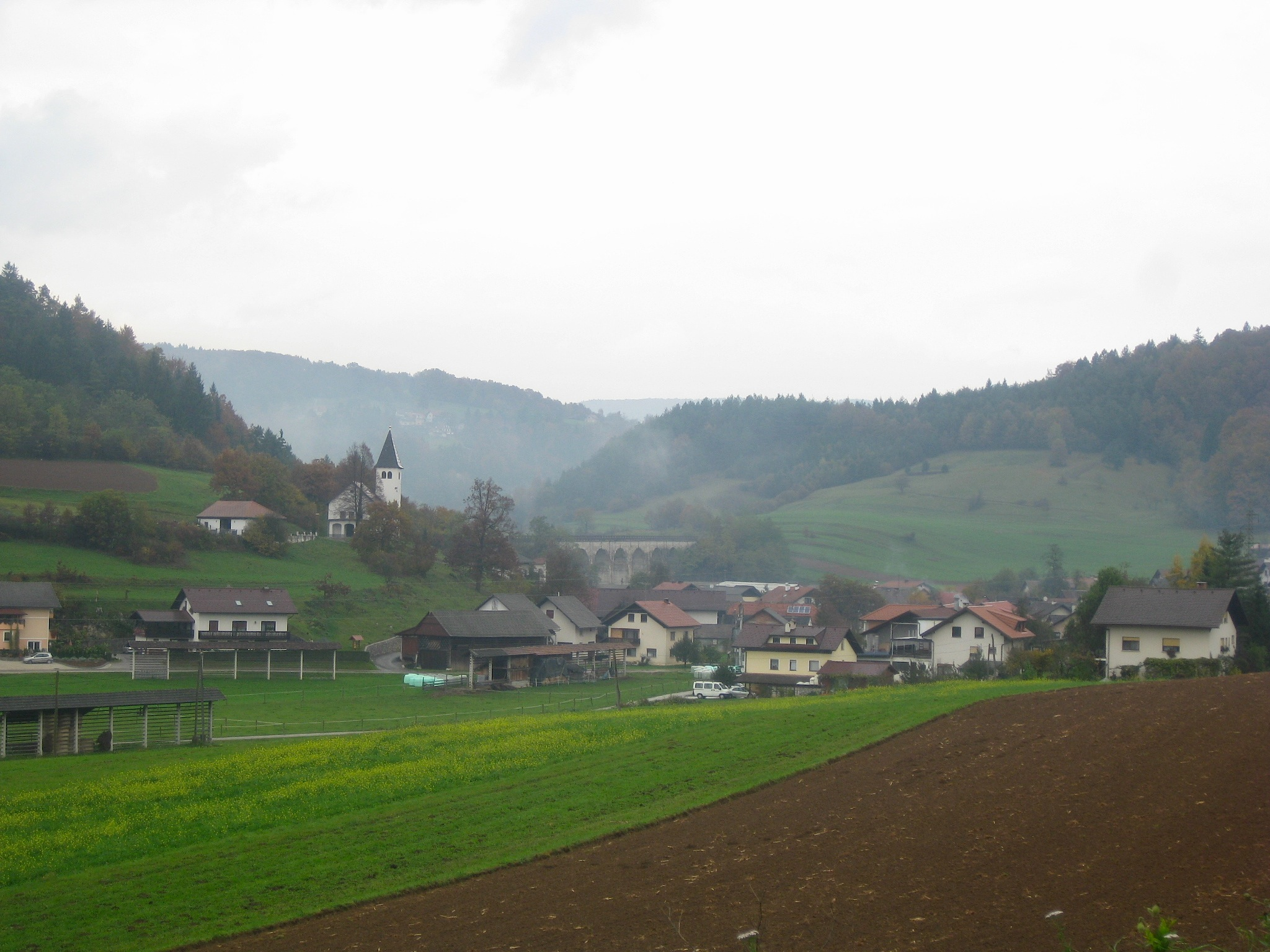

- Location in Slovenia
- Coordinates: 45°56′18.53″N 14°43′22.71″E
- Country: Slovenia
- Traditional region: Lower Carniola
- Statistical region: Central Slovenia
- Municipality: Grosuplje

Area
  - Total: 2.56 km^{2} (0.99 sq mi)
- Elevation: 328.8 m (1,079 ft)

Population (2002)
  - Total: 237
- Time zone: UTC+1 (Central European Time)
- ISO 3166 code: SVN

Velika Loka (pronounced [ˈʋeːlika ˈloːka]; German: Großlack) is a village in the Municipality of Grosuplje in central Slovenia. It lies south of Višnja Gora in the historical region of Lower Carniola. The municipality is now included in the Central Slovenia Statistical Region.

== Church ==
Saint Anthony of Padua Church

The local church is dedicated to Anthony of Padua and belongs to the Parish of Žalna. It was built between 1938 and 1940.
