= In vino veritas (disambiguation) =

In vino veritas is a Latin phrase meaning "in wine [there is the] truth".

In vino veritas may also refer to:

In television:

- "In Vino Veritas" (Law & Order), an episode of Law & Order
- "In vino veritas", an episode of Growing Pains
- "In Vino Veritas", an episode of Minder
- "In Vino Veritas", an episode of Royal Pains

In music:

- In Vino Veritas, an album by Airway Lanes
- In Vino Veritas, an album by Costello
- "In Vino Veritas", a song by Boyd Rice, Douglas P. and John Murphy from Heaven Sent

== See also ==
- "In Vino Veritas II", a song by A Wilhelm Scream from Ruiner
