= Višnje, Ivančna Gorica =

Višnje
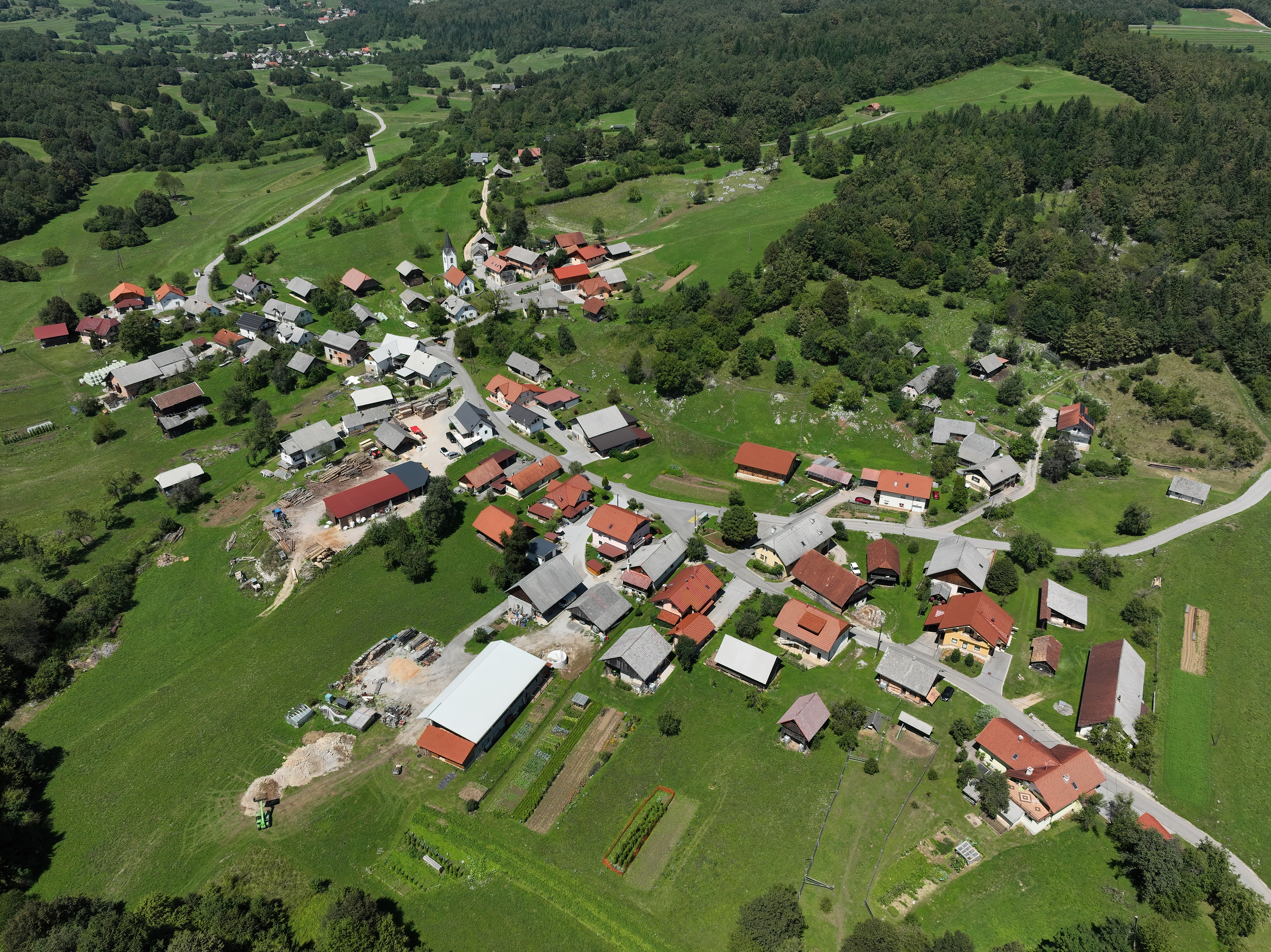

- Location in Slovenia
- Coordinates: 45°48′30.9″N 14°50′1.05″E
- Country: Slovenia
- Traditional region: Lower Carniola
- Statistical region: Central Slovenia
- Municipality: Ivančna Gorica

Area
  - Total: 5.47 km^{2} (2.11 sq mi)
- Elevation: 370.1 m (1,214 ft)

Population (2002)
  - Total: 94

Višnje (pronounced [ˈʋiːʃnjɛ]) is a village south of Ambrus in the Municipality of Ivančna Gorica in central Slovenia. The area is part of the historical region of Lower Carniola. The municipality is now included in the Central Slovenia Statistical Region.

== Church ==
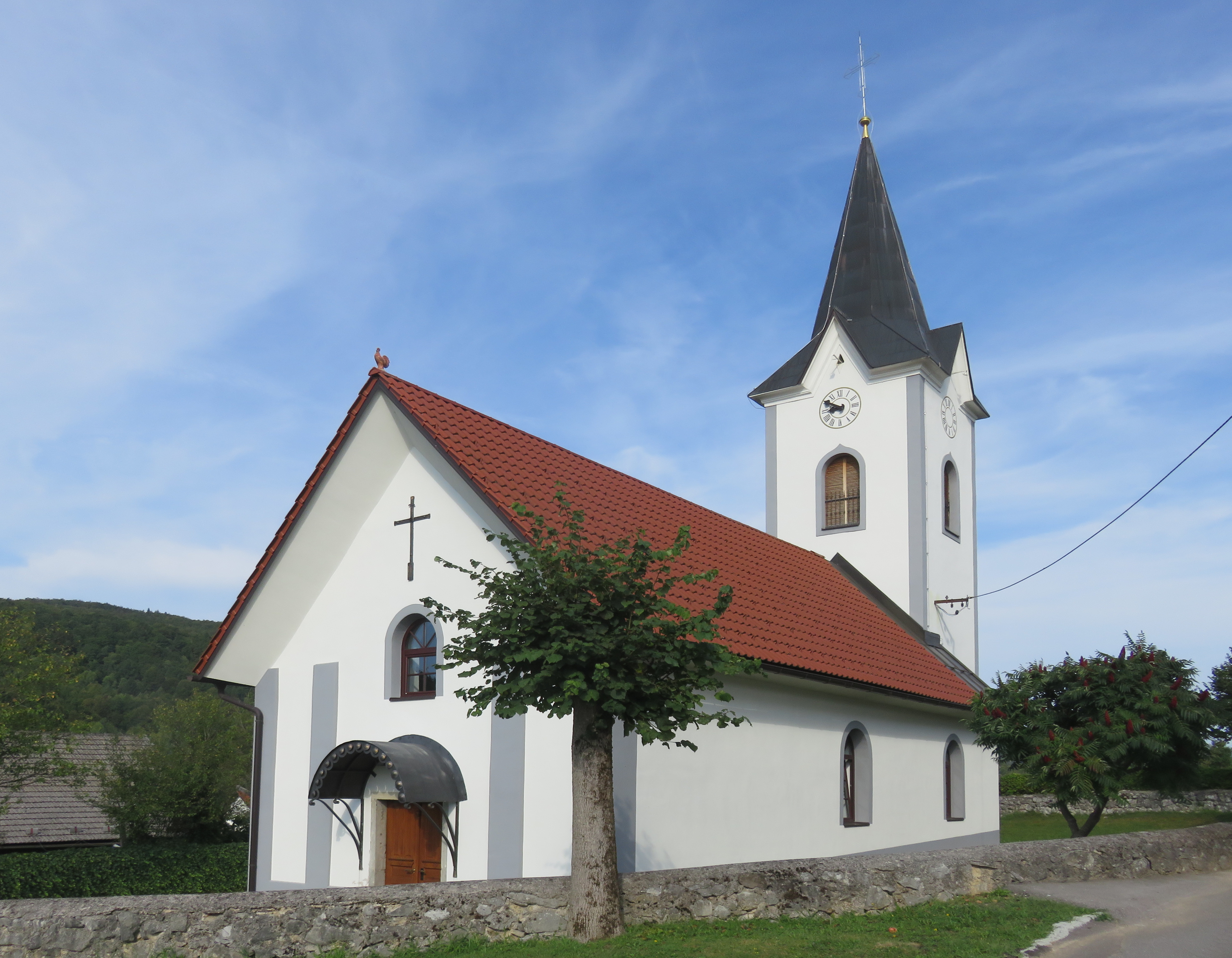
Saints Phillip and James Church

The local church is dedicated to Saints Phillip and James and belongs to the Parish of Ambrus. It was first mentioned in written documents dating to 1136, but burned down in 1943. It was rebuilt in 1968.
