= Velike Dole, Trebnje =

Velike Dole
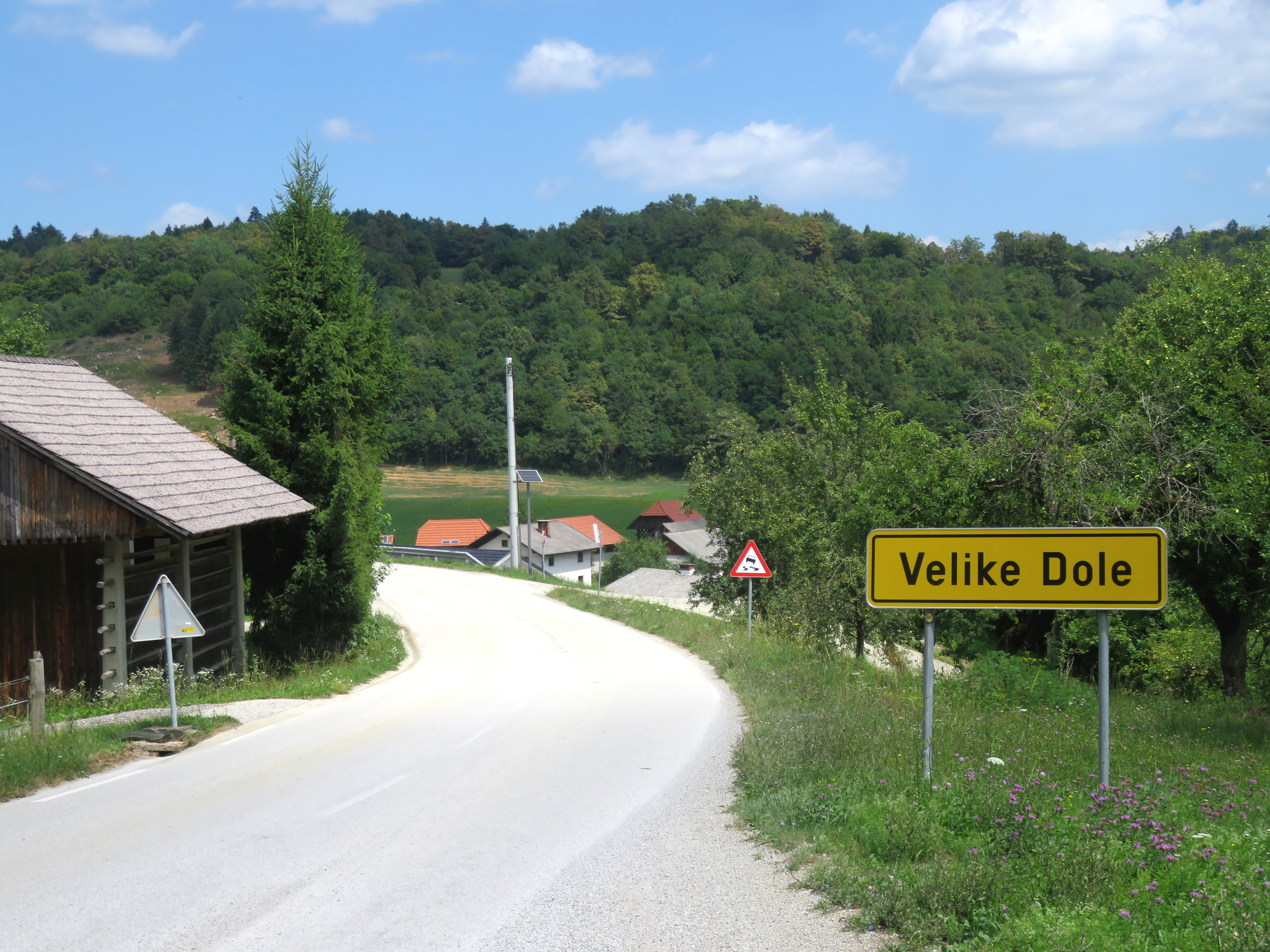

- Location in Slovenia
- Coordinates: 45°54′32.02″N 14°53′51.53″E
- Country: Slovenia
- Traditional region: Lower Carniola
- Statistical region: Southeast Slovenia
- Municipality: Trebnje

Area
  - Total: 1.62 km^{2} (0.63 sq mi)
- Elevation: 333.9 m (1,095 ft)

Population (2002)
  - Total: 46

Velike Dole (pronounced [ˈʋeːlike ˈdoːlɛ]; German: Großdule) is a small settlement in the Municipality of Trebnje in eastern Slovenia. It lies on the regional road leading south from Zagorica pri Velikem Gabru to Žužemberk. The area is part of the historical region of Lower Carniola. The municipality is now included in the Southeast Slovenia Statistical Region.
