= Volaka =

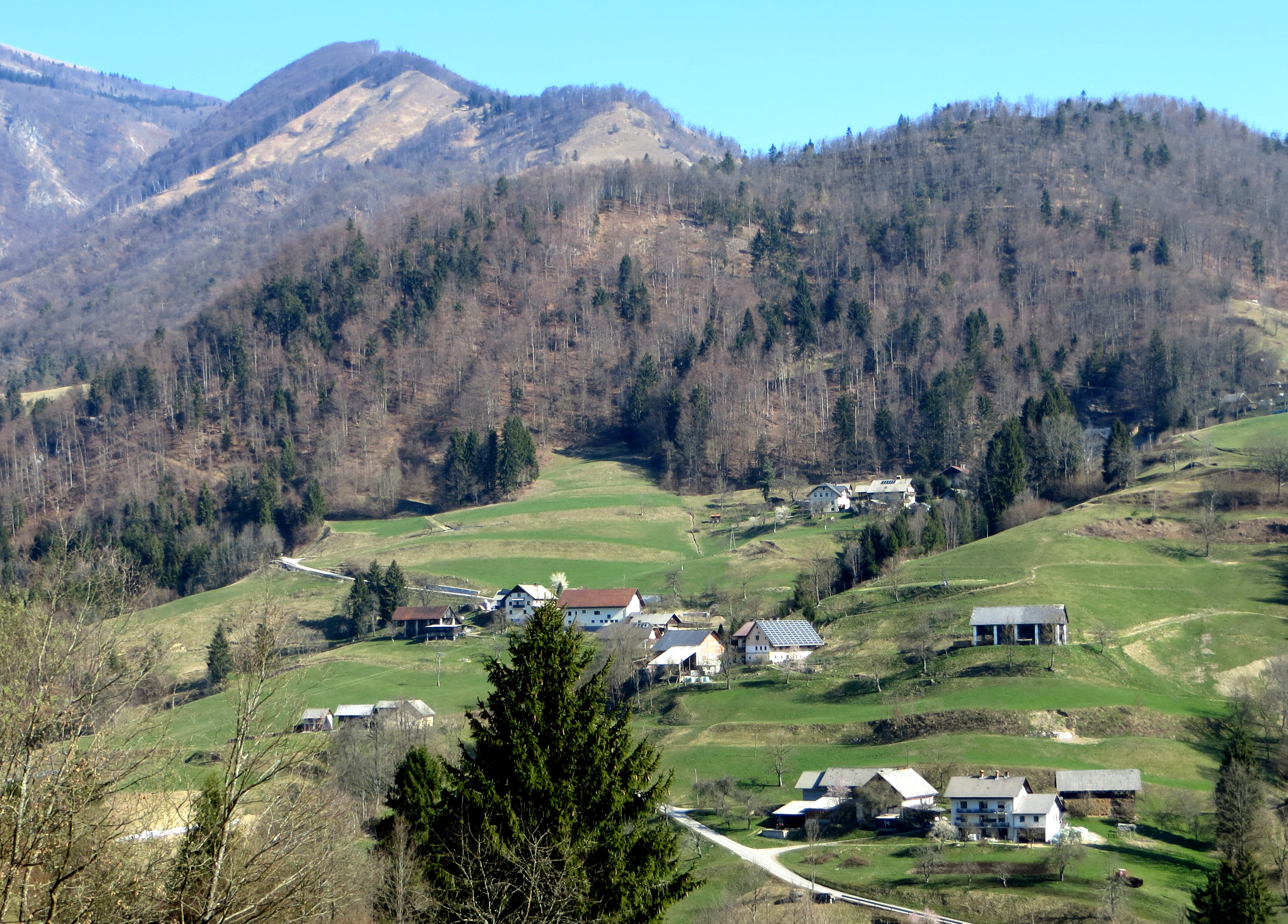

- Location in Slovenia
- Coordinates: 46°7′45.1″N 14°6′46.43″E
- Country: Slovenia
- Traditional region: Upper Carniola
- Statistical region: Upper Carniola
- Municipality: Gorenja Vas–Poljane

Area
  - Total: 1.5 km^{2} (0.58 sq mi)
- Elevation: 459.6 m (1,508 ft)

Population (2020)
  - Total: 98
  - Density: 65/km^{2} (170/sq mi)

Volaka (pronounced [ʋɔˈlaːka]) is a dispersed settlement in the hills north of Hotavlje in the Municipality of Gorenja Vas–Poljane in the Upper Carniola region of Slovenia.

== Name ==
The name Volaka is believed to refer to early foreign-born residents of the settlement, related to the word Vlach.

== History ==
Volaščica Creek, which runs through the settlement, was set as the original border of the Dominion of Freising in AD 973. Oral tradition states that in the 11th century a castle owned by Hemma of Gurk stood on Gradišče Hill above the settlement. In the 17th century, iron ore was dug in the area and carried across the hills to Potok and Železniki for processing. For a number of years a foundry operated in Volaka.
