= Vrhovlje, Lukovica =

Vrhovlje
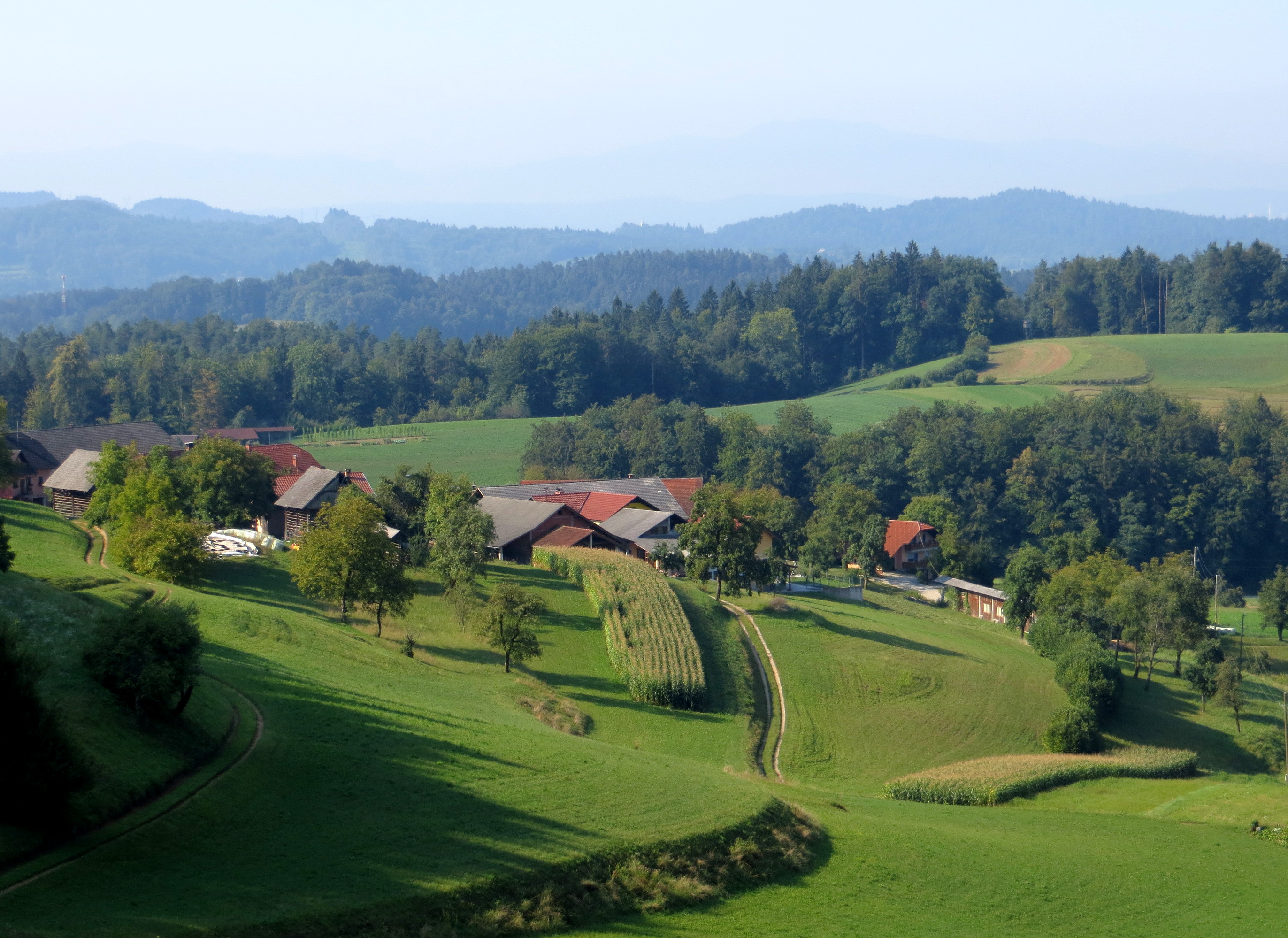

- Location in Slovenia
- Coordinates: 46°10′40.92″N 14°40′7.71″E
- Country: Slovenia
- Traditional region: Upper Carniola
- Statistical region: Central Slovenia
- Municipality: Lukovica

Area
  - Total: 1.03 km^{2} (0.40 sq mi)
- Elevation: 393.7 m (1,292 ft)

Population (2002)
  - Total: 89

Vrhovlje (pronounced [ʋəɾˈxoːu̯ljɛ]) is a small village above Lukovica pri Domžalah in the eastern part of the Upper Carniola region of Slovenia.
