= Cerklje na Gorenjskem =

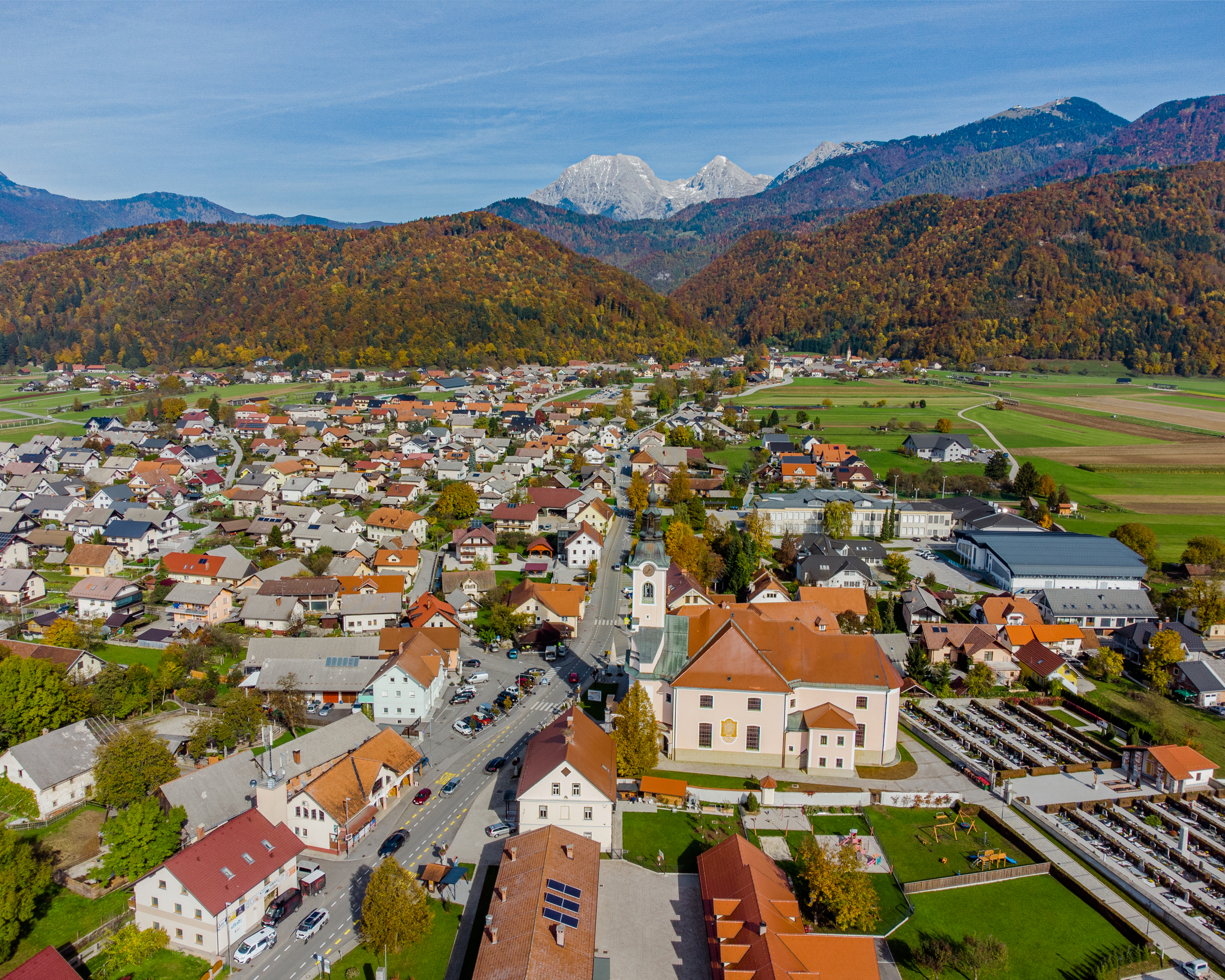

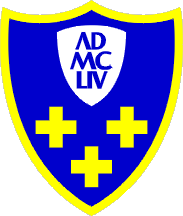
- Flag Coat of arms

- Place in Slovenia
- Coordinates: 46°14′55.68″N 14°29′7.88″E
- Country: Slovenia
- Traditional Region: Upper Carniola
- Statistical region: Upper Carniola
- Municipality: Cerklje na Gorenjskem

Government
- Elevation: 391.2 m (1,283 ft)

Population (2020)
  - Total: 1,710
- Postal code: 4207 Cerklje na Gorenjskem

Cerklje na Gorenjskem (pronounced [tsɛɾˈklɛ na ɡɔˈɾeːnskɛm]; German: Zirklach) is a village in northwestern Slovenia. It is the seat of the Municipality of Cerklje na Gorenjskem.

== Geography ==
Cerklje na Gorenjskem lies at the foot of Mount Krvavec. It is surrounded by forests, fields, and other agricultural areas.

== Name ==
Cerklje na Gorenjskem was attested in historical sources in 1147 as Sancta Maria (and as Ecclesia sancte Marie in Cirkelach in 1239 and Zirchlach in 1271). The name Cerklje is derived from the plural demonym *Cerkъvľane (< *cerьky 'church'), meaning 'people living on church territory' or 'residents of the village with the church'. In the distant past, the settlement was also known as Trnovlje in Slovene (attested as in Tirnovlach in 1239), from the church dedicated to Our Lady of the Thorn (Slovene: Marija v Trnju). The name of the settlement was changed from Cerklje to Cerklje na Gorenjskem in 1952. In the past the German name was Zirklach.

== Recreation ==
Cerklje na Gorenjskem is a popular starting point for hiking and biking, and for other activities in the vicinity, such as skiing at Mount Krvavec, mountain hiking, climbing, and paragliding.

== Notable people ==
Notable people that were born or lived in Cerklje na Gorenjskem include:

- France Barle (1864–1928), fire department organizer
- Ignacij Borštnik (1858–1919), theater actor
- Ivan Lavrenčič (1857–1930), historian and politician
- Matej Medved (1796–1865), builder of several churches in Slovenia
- Ivan Šturm (1856–1935), theater actor
- Andrej Vavken (1838–1898), composer and mayor

== Distances (in a straight line) ==
- Cerklje to Ljubljana = 22 km
- Cerklje to Kranj = 11 km
- Cerklje to Kamnik = 10 km
- Cerklje to Šenčur = 5 km
- Cerklje to Mount Krvavec = 6 km
