= Vrbovec, Trebnje =

Vrbovec
- Location in Slovenia
- Coordinates: 45°51′47.3″N 14°59′48.37″E
- Country: Slovenia
- Traditional region: Lower Carniola
- Statistical region: Southeast Slovenia
- Municipality: Trebnje

Area
  - Total: 1.63 km^{2} (0.63 sq mi)
- Elevation: 227.9 m (748 ft)

Population (2002)
  - Total: 113

Vrbovec (pronounced [ʋərˈbɔːʋəts]) is a village southeast of Dobrnič in the Municipality of Trebnje in eastern Slovenia. The area is part of the traditional region of Lower Carniola. The municipality is now included in the Southeast Slovenia Statistical Region.
