= Vino, Grosuplje =

Vino
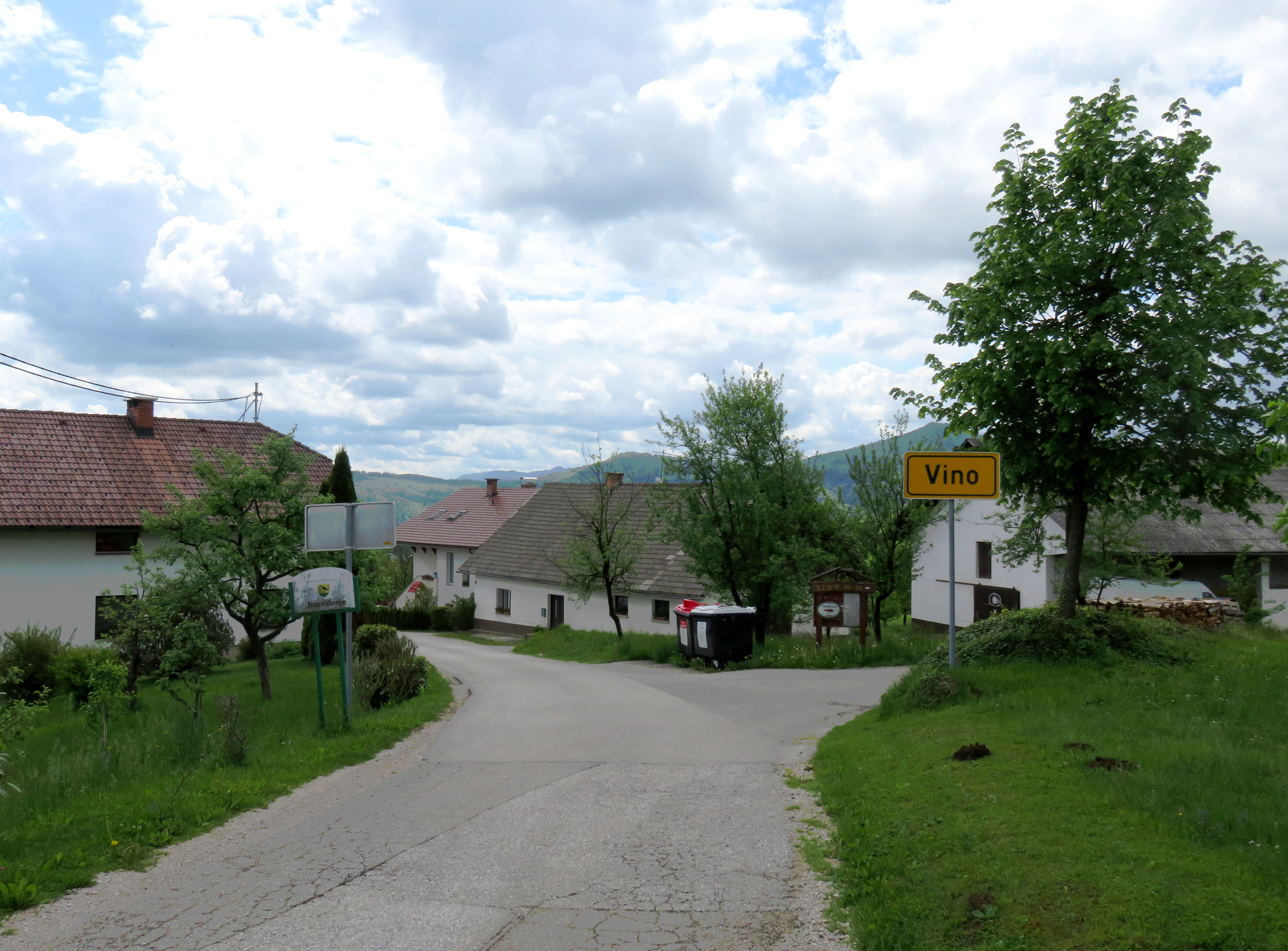

- Location in Slovenia
- Coordinates: 45°56′20.83″N 14°36′13.24″E
- Country: Slovenia
- Traditional region: Lower Carniola
- Statistical region: Central Slovenia
- Municipality: Grosuplje

Area
  - Total: 2.05 km^{2} (0.79 sq mi)
- Elevation: 405.4 m (1,330 ft)

Population (2002)
  - Total: 120

Vino (pronounced [ˈʋiːnɔ]; German: Vinu) is a small village in the Municipality of Grosuplje in central Slovenia. It lies in the hills west of Grosuplje in the historical region of Lower Carniola. The municipality is now included in the Central Slovenia Statistical Region.

== Name ==
Vino was attested in written sources in 1439 as Weintal. The name is believed to derive from the archaic meaning 'vineyard' of the Slovene noun vino (which now means only 'wine'), referring to the local agriculture.

== Church ==
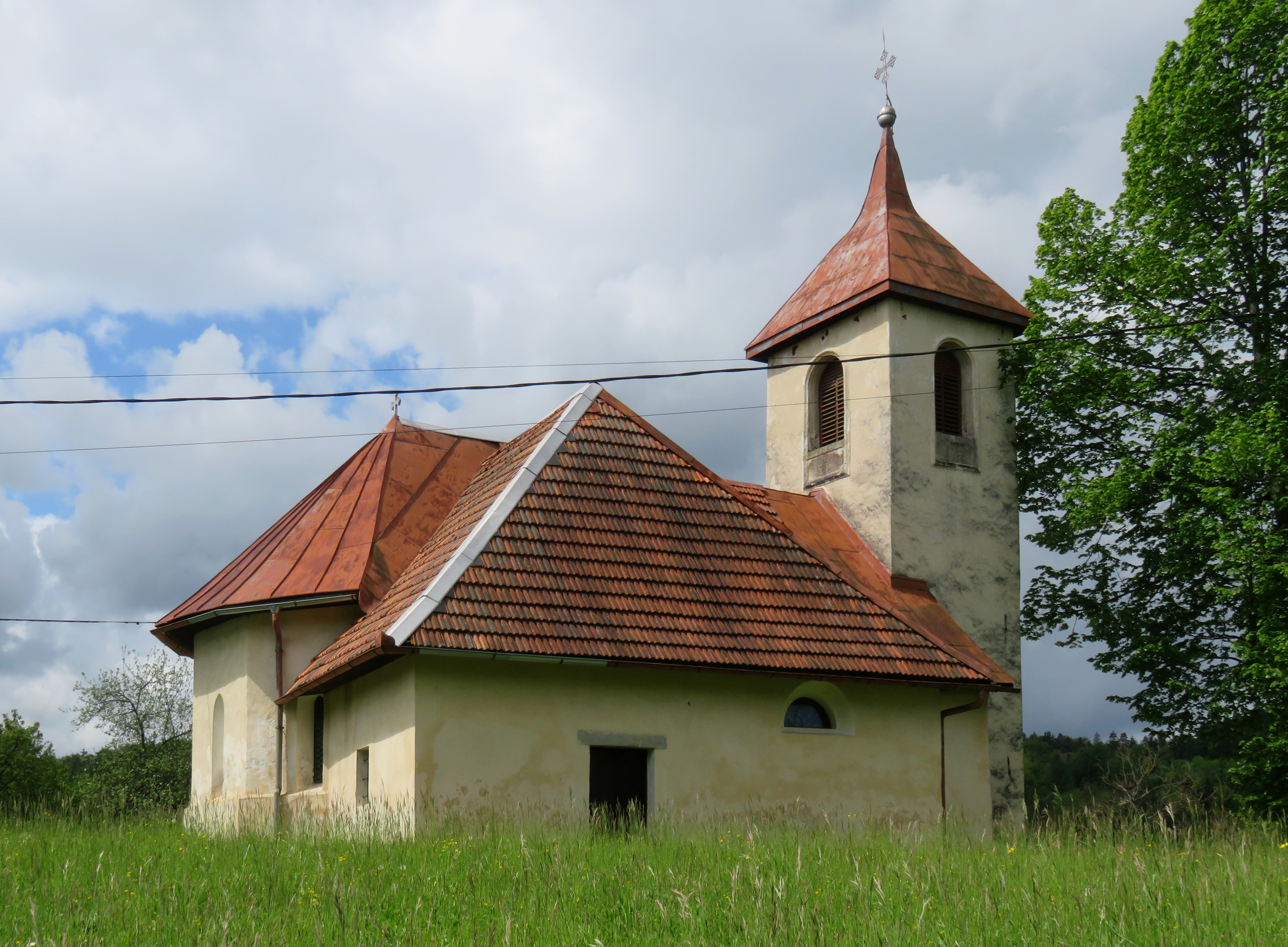
Saint Stephen's Church

The local church is dedicated to Saint Stephen and belongs to the Parish of Št. Jurij pri Grosupljem. In its core it is a 14th-century Gothic building with later additions.
