= Zagorica pri Velikem Gabru =

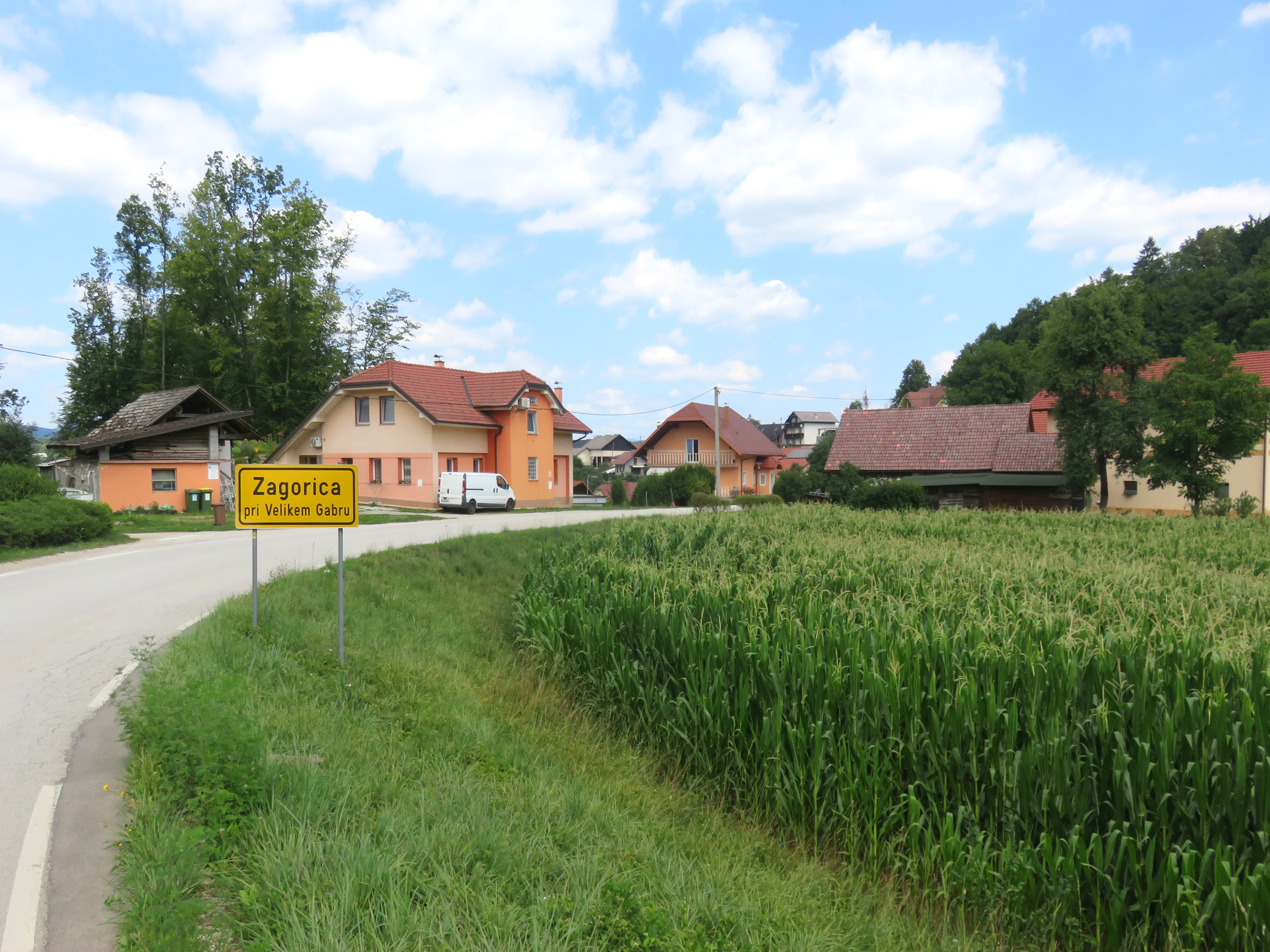

- Location in Slovenia
- Coordinates: 45°55′17.67″N 14°53′24.07″E
- Country: Slovenia
- Traditional region: Lower Carniola
- Statistical region: Southeast Slovenia
- Municipality: Trebnje

Area
  - Total: 2.89 km^{2} (1.12 sq mi)
- Elevation: 316.7 m (1,039 ft)

Population (2002)
  - Total: 229

Zagorica pri Velikem Gabru (pronounced [zaɡɔˈɾiːtsa pɾi ˈʋeːlikɛm ˈɡaːbɾu]; German: Sagoritza) is a village in the Municipality of Trebnje in eastern Slovenia. It lies just south of the A2 motorway in the historical region of Lower Carniola. The municipality is now included in the Southeast Slovenia Statistical Region.

== Geography ==
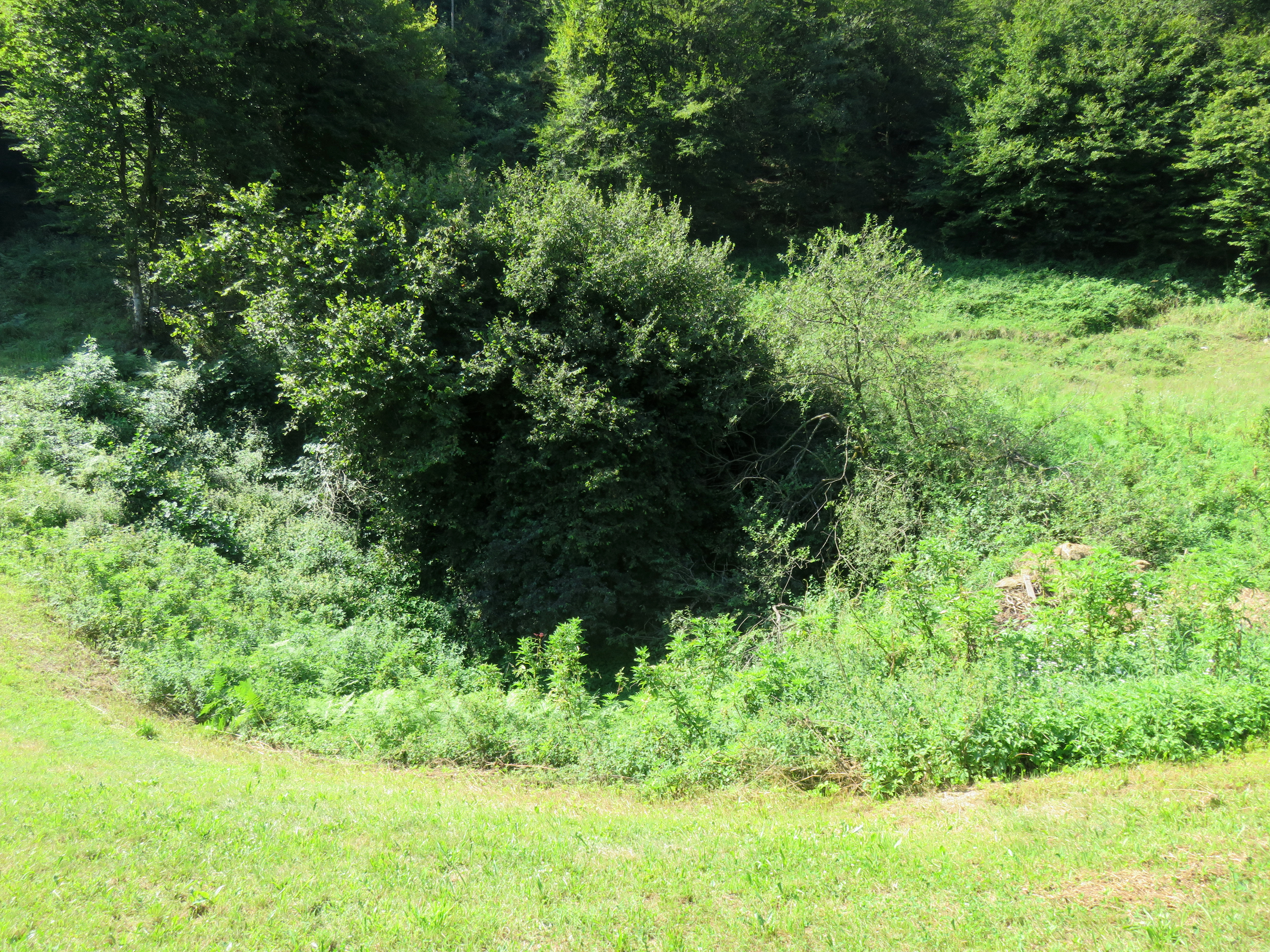
The Kovač Sinkhole

Zagorica pri Velikem Gabru is a clustered village standing in parts of two valley embayments of the Pule Valley (also known as the Field Valley, Slovene: Poljska dolina) and on a gentle rise between the two embayments. The hamlet of Gomila stands south of the main part of the village, on a rise above the small Devence (or Devnice) Valley. There are several ponds used for watering cattle, the largest of which is Biček Pond. During heavy rains, Šumnik Creek flows from Strmca Hill (elevation: 415 meters or 1,362 feet) into the Podstrmec Valley east of the village, disappearing into sinkholes. The fertile Podstrmec Valley floods during heavy rains, with water rising from and disappearing into estavelles, the largest of which is the Kovač Sinkhole (Slovene: Kovačeva rupa). On the slope of Strmec Hill above the valley is Wolf Cave (Slovene: Volčji kevder), known to be frequented by bears.

== Name ==
The name of the settlement was changed from Zagorica to Zagorica pri Velikem Gabru in 1953. In the past the German name was Sagoritza.

== Cultural heritage ==
During the construction of the motorway an archaeological site with Eneolithic, La Tène–period, Roman-period and early medieval settlement layers was discovered in the area.
