= Veliki Gaber =

- Village
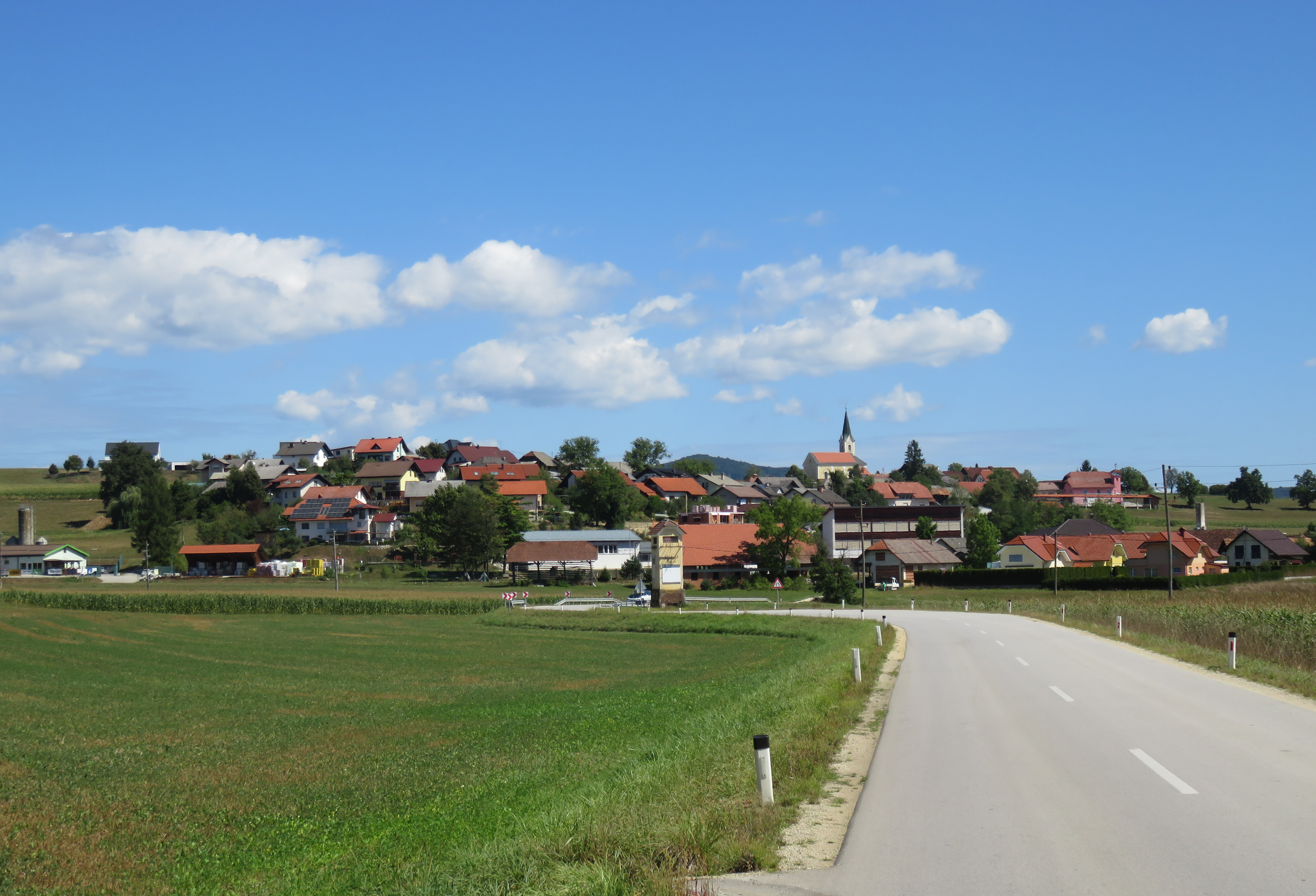

- Location in Slovenia
- Coordinates: 45°56′17.65″N 14°54′32.66″E
- Country: Slovenia
- Traditional region: Lower Carniola
- Statistical region: Southeast Slovenia
- Municipality: Trebnje

Area
  - Total: 1.34 km^{2} (0.52 sq mi)
- Elevation: 347.9 m (1,141 ft)

Population (2002)
  - Total: 315

Veliki Gaber (pronounced [ˈʋeːliki ˈɡaːbəɾ]; German: Großgaber) is a village in the Municipality of Trebnje in eastern Slovenia. It lies just north of the Slovenian A2 motorway east of Ivančna Gorica. The area is part of the traditional region of Lower Carniola. The municipality is now included in the Southeast Slovenia Statistical Region.

== Church ==
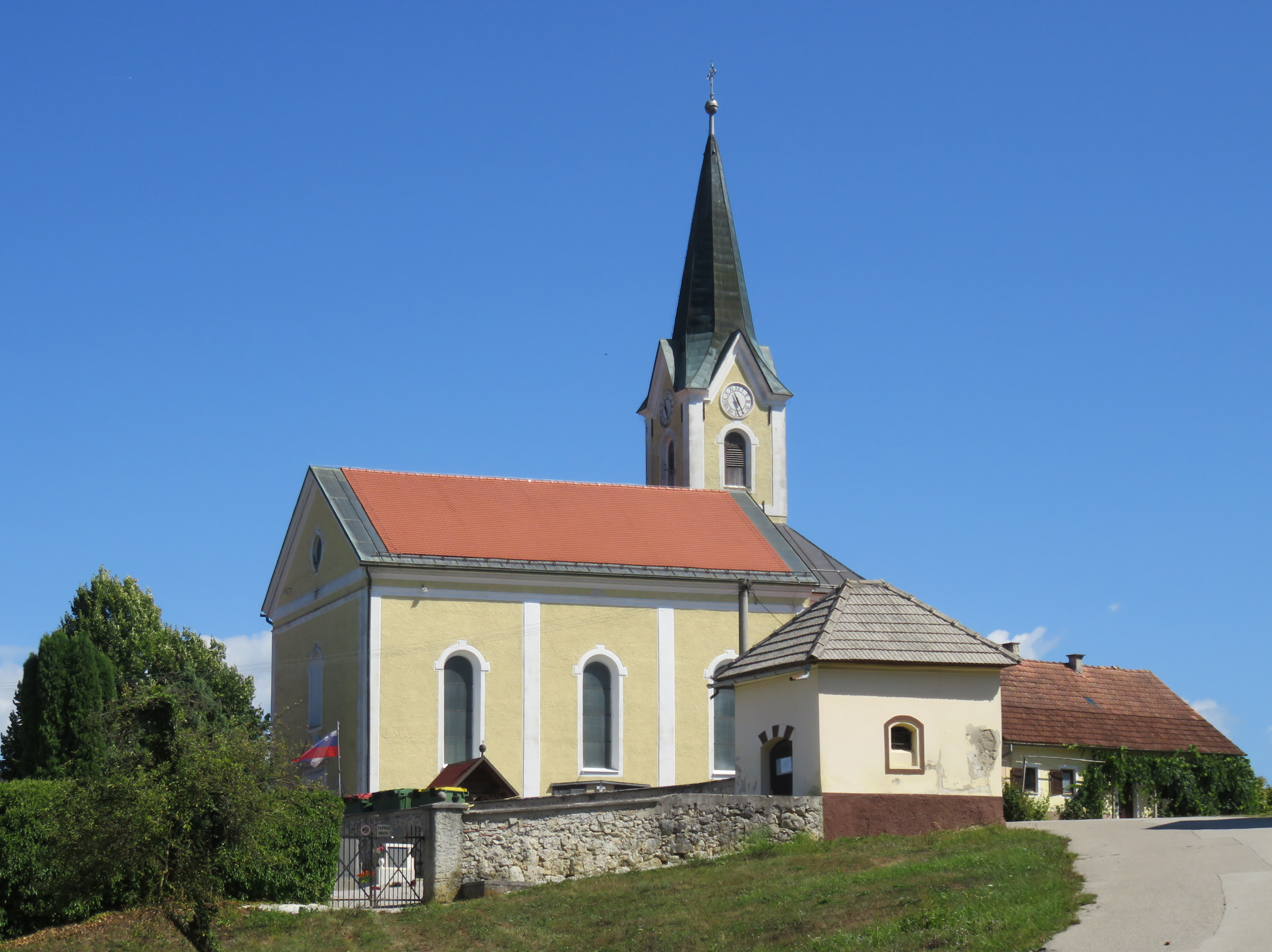
Saint Ulrich's Church

The local parish church is dedicated to Saint Ulrich (Slovene: sveti Urh) and belongs to the Roman Catholic Diocese of Novo Mesto. It was built in 1910 on the site of a 17th-century predecessor.

== Gallery ==
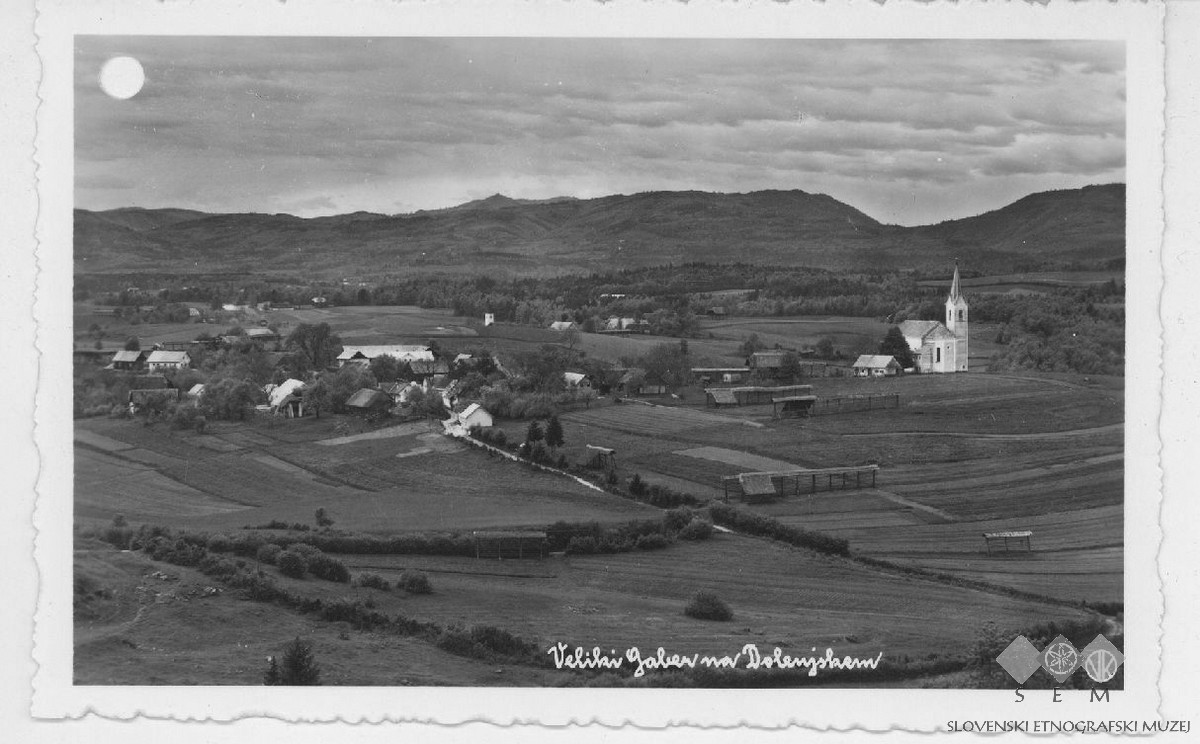
Historical postcard of Veliki Gaber
