= Vir, Domžale =

Vir
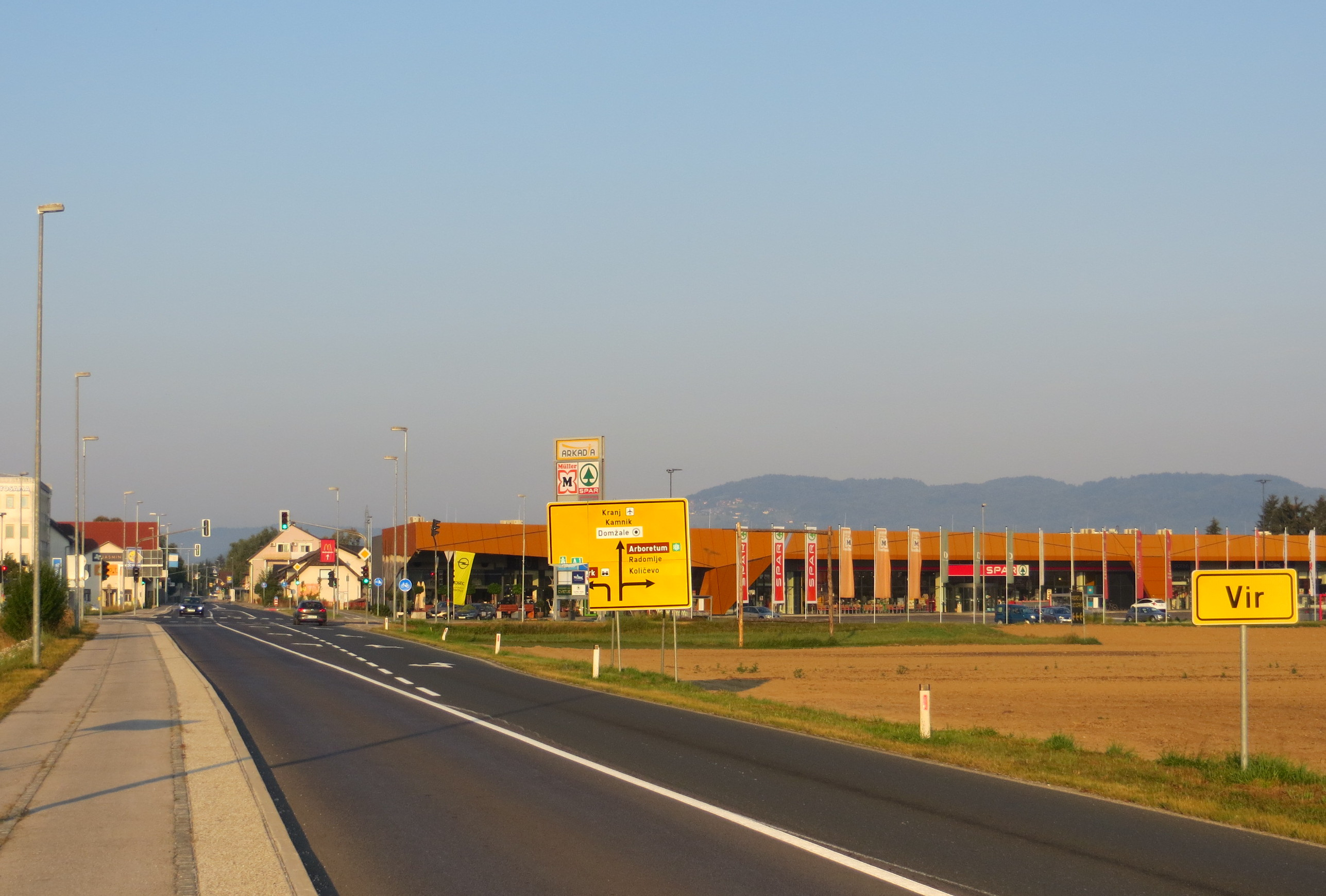

- Location in Slovenia
- Coordinates: 46°8′58.18″N 14°36′21.36″E
- Country: Slovenia
- Traditional region: Upper Carniola
- Statistical region: Central Slovenia
- Municipality: Domžale

Area
  - Total: 1.43 km^{2} (0.55 sq mi)
- Elevation: 305.6 m (1,003 ft)

Population (2020)
  - Total: 3,449
  - Density: 2,410/km^{2} (6,250/sq mi)
- Time zone: UTC+01 (CET)
  - Summer (DST): UTC+02 (CEST)

Vir (pronounced [ˈʋiːɾ]) is a settlement on the left bank of the Kamnik Bistrica River opposite Domžale in the Upper Carniola region of Slovenia.

== Church ==
The Parish of Vir was established in 1998. A new parish church dedicated to Saint Joseph was built in the settlement and consecrated in 2010.
