= Rakovec, Šmarje pri Jelšah =

Rakovec
- Location in Slovenia
- Coordinates: 46°12′19.13″N 15°28′31.65″E
- Country: Slovenia
- Traditional region: Styria
- Statistical region: Savinja
- Municipality: Šmarje pri Jelšah

Area
  - Total: 2.18 km^{2} (0.84 sq mi)
- Elevation: 351.1 m (1,152 ft)

Population (2002)
  - Total: 52

Rakovec (pronounced [ˈɾaːkɔʋəts]) is a settlement in the Municipality of Šmarje pri Jelšah in eastern Slovenia. It lies in the hills southeast of Grobelno in the northern part of the Kozje region (Slovene: Kozjansko). The entire municipality is part of the historical Styria region and is included in the Savinja Statistical Region.
