= Bobovo =

Bobovo may refer to:

- Bobovo, Pljevlja, Montenegro
- Bobovo (Svilajnac), Serbia
- Bobovo pri Ponikvi, Slovenia
- Bobovo pri Šmarju, Slovenia
