= Polžanska Gorca =

- Location in Slovenia
- Coordinates: 46°16′3.67″N 15°30′45.31″E
- Country: Slovenia
- Traditional region: Styria
- Statistical region: Savinja
- Municipality: Šmarje pri Jelšah

Area
  - Total: 1.42 km^{2} (0.55 sq mi)
- Elevation: 332 m (1,089 ft)

Population (2002)
  - Total: 114

Polžanska Gorca (pronounced [pɔu̯ˈʒaːnska ˈɡɔːɾtsa]) is a settlement west of Sladka Gora and north of Polžanska Vas in the Municipality of Šmarje pri Jelšah in eastern Slovenia. The area was historically part of the Styria region. The municipality is now included in the Savinja Statistical Region.
