= Brezje pri Lekmarju =

- Location in Slovenia
- Coordinates: 46°11′33.5″N 15°30′52.11″E
- Country: Slovenia
- Traditional region: Styria
- Statistical region: Savinja
- Municipality: Šmarje pri Jelšah

Area
  - Total: 0.94 km^{2} (0.36 sq mi)
- Elevation: 374 m (1,227 ft)

Population (2002)
  - Total: 48

Brezje pri Lekmarju (pronounced [ˈbɾeːzjɛ pɾi ˈleːkmarju]) is a small settlement in the Municipality of Šmarje pri Jelšah in eastern Slovenia. It lies in the Kozje region (Slovene: Kozjansko) south of Šmarje and east of Sveti Štefan. The area is part of the traditional region of Styria. The municipality is now included in the Savinja Statistical Region.

== Name ==
The name of the settlement was changed from Brezje to Brezje pri Lekmarju in 1953.
