= Završe pri Grobelnem =

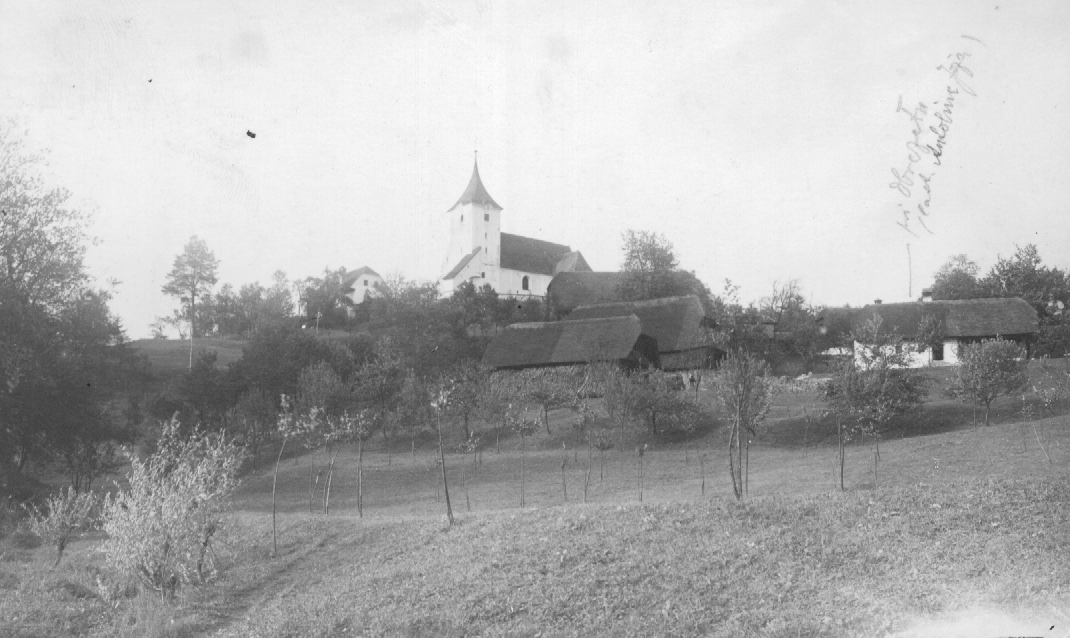

- Location in Slovenia
- Coordinates: 46°13′31.18″N 15°26′36.07″E
- Country: Slovenia
- Traditional region: Styria
- Statistical region: Savinja
- Municipality: Šmarje pri Jelšah

Area
  - Total: 1.05 km^{2} (0.41 sq mi)
- Elevation: 322.4 m (1,058 ft)

Population (2002)
  - Total: 132

Završe pri Grobelnem (pronounced [ˈzaːʋəɾʃɛ pɾi ˈɡɾoːbəlnɛm], German: Sawersche) is a settlement in the Municipality of Šmarje pri Jelšah in eastern Slovenia. It lies just north of Grobelno, off the regional road from Šmarje to Šentjur. The area is part of the traditional region of Styria. The municipality is now included in the Savinja Statistical Region.

== Name ==
The name of the settlement was changed from Završe to Završe pri Grobelnem in 1953.

== Church ==
The local church is dedicated to Our Lady of Good Counsel (Slovene: Mati dobrega sveta) and belongs to the Parish of Šentvid pri Grobelnem. It dates to the early 15th century and was slightly restyled in the 18th century.
