= Babna Reka =

- Location in Slovenia
- Coordinates: 46°10′23.34″N 15°31′4.56″E
- Country: Slovenia
- Traditional region: Styria
- Statistical region: Savinja
- Municipality: Šmarje pri Jelšah

Area
  - Total: 2.66 km^{2} (1.03 sq mi)
- Elevation: 255.6 m (839 ft)

Population (2002)
  - Total: 99

Babna Reka (pronounced [ˈbaːbna ˈɾeːka]) is a dispersed settlement in the Municipality of Šmarje pri Jelšah in eastern Slovenia. It lies in the Kozje region (Slovene: Kozjansko) to the south of Šmarje. The area is part of the traditional region of Styria. The municipality is now included in the Savinja Statistical Region.
