= Bodrišna Vas =

- Location in Slovenia
- Coordinates: 46°14′1.28″N 15°28′2.2″E
- Country: Slovenia
- Traditional region: Styria
- Statistical region: Savinja
- Municipality: Šmarje pri Jelšah

Area
  - Total: 1.73 km^{2} (0.67 sq mi)
- Elevation: 275.5 m (904 ft)

Population (2002)
  - Total: 119

Bodrišna Vas (pronounced [bɔˈdɾiːʃna ˈʋaːs]; Slovene: Bodrišna vas) is a settlement in the Municipality of Šmarje pri Jelšah in eastern Slovenia. It lies in the hills north of Šentvid pri Grobelnem in the historical region of Styria. The municipality is now included in the Savinja Statistical Region.
