= Bodrež =

Bodrež is a place name that may refer to:

- Bodrež, Kanal, a village in the Municipality of Kanal, southwestern Slovenia
- Bodrež, Šmarje pri Jelšah, a village in the Municipality of Šmarje pri Jelšah, eastern Slovenia
