= Beli Potok pri Lembergu =

- Location in Slovenia
- Coordinates: 46°15′51.73″N 15°32′55.03″E
- Country: Slovenia
- Traditional region: Styria
- Statistical region: Savinja
- Municipality: Šmarje pri Jelšah

Area
  - Total: 0.52 km^{2} (0.20 sq mi)
- Elevation: 296.4 m (972 ft)

Population (2002)
  - Total: 44

Beli Potok pri Lembergu (pronounced [ˈbeːli ˈpɔːtɔk pɾi ˈleːmbɛɾɡu]) is a small settlement in the Municipality of Šmarje pri Jelšah in eastern Slovenia. It lies in the hills north of Lemberg just off the regional road to Poljčane. The area is part of the traditional region of Styria. The municipality is now included in the Savinja Statistical Region.

== Name ==
The name of the settlement was changed from Beli Potok to Beli Potok pri Lembergu in 1953.
