= Dol pri Pristavi =

- Location in Slovenia
- Coordinates: 46°11′58.56″N 15°34′56.31″E
- Country: Slovenia
- Traditional region: Styria
- Statistical region: Savinja
- Municipality: Šmarje pri Jelšah

Area
  - Total: 0.75 km^{2} (0.29 sq mi)
- Elevation: 207.2 m (680 ft)

Population (2002)
  - Total: 57

Dol pri Pristavi (pronounced [ˈdoːl pɾi ˈpɾiːstaʋi]) is a settlement just northwest of Pristava pri Mestinju in eastern Slovenia. It belongs to the Municipality of Šmarje pri Jelšah. The area is part of the traditional region of Styria and is now included in the Savinja Statistical Region. The railway line from Celje to Zagreb runs through the settlement.

== Name ==
The name of the settlement was changed from Dol to Dol pri Pristavi in 1953.

== Gallery ==
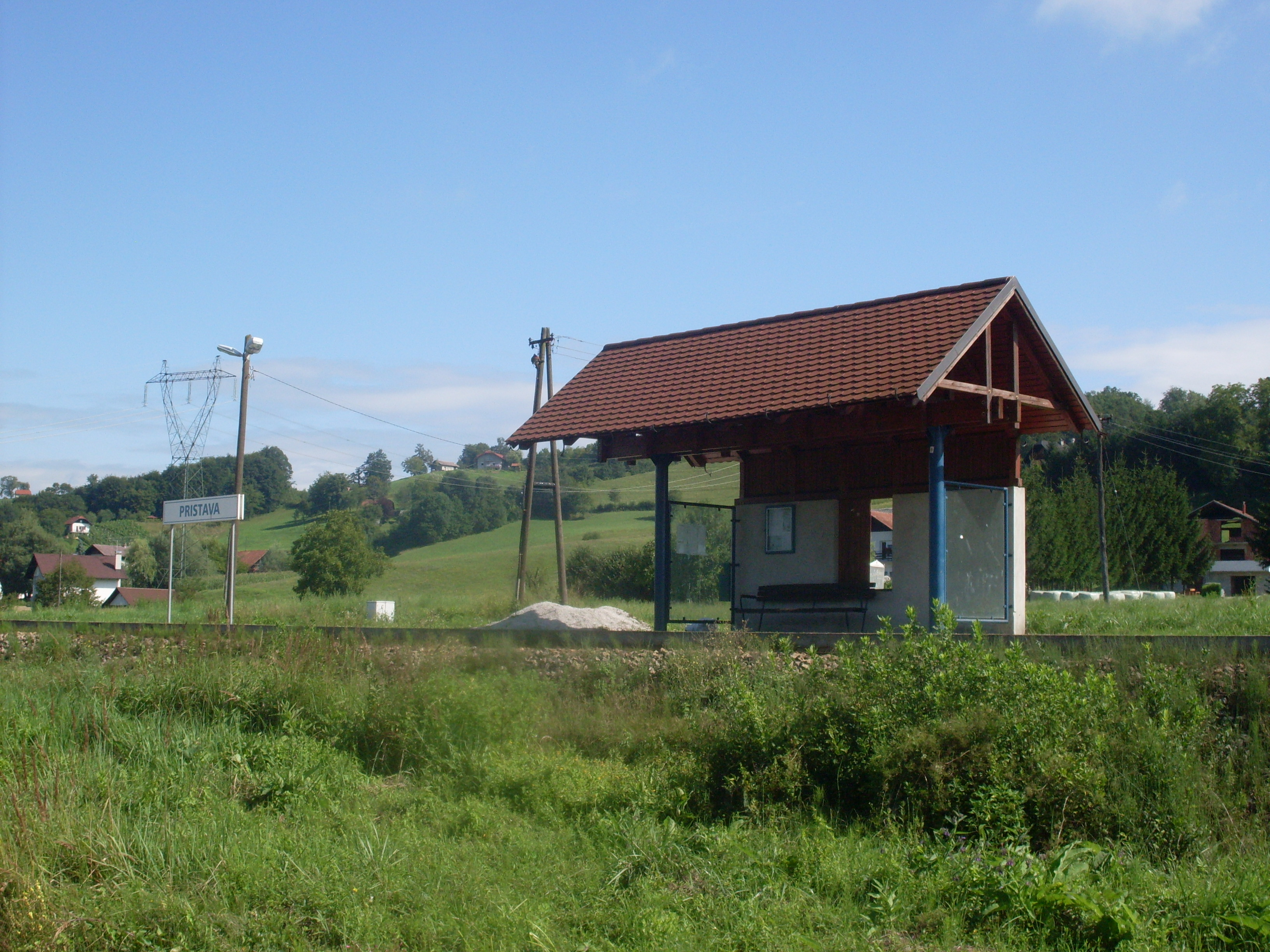
Railway halt in Dol pri Pristavi
