= Babna Gora =

Babna Gora may refer to several places in Slovenia:

- Babna Gora, Dobrova–Polhov Gradec, a settlement in the Municipality of Dobrova–Polhov Gradec
- Babna Gora, Šmarje pri Jelšah, a settlement in the Municipality of Šmarje pri Jelšah
- Babna Gora, Trebnje, a settlement in the Municipality of Trebnje
