= Lipovec, Šmarje pri Jelšah =

Lipovec
- Location in Slovenia
- Coordinates: 46°11′49.87″N 15°27′39.16″E
- Country: Slovenia
- Traditional region: Styria
- Statistical region: Savinja
- Municipality: Šmarje pri Jelšah

Area
  - Total: 1.75 km^{2} (0.68 sq mi)
- Elevation: 348.6 m (1,144 ft)

Population (2002)
  - Total: 44

Lipovec (pronounced [ˈliːpɔʋəts]) is a small dispersed settlement in the Municipality of Šmarje pri Jelšah in eastern Slovenia. It lies in the hills south of Šmarje in the northern part of the Kozje region (Slovene: Kozjansko). The area is part of the historical Styria region. The municipality is now included in the Savinja Statistical Region.
