= Pustike =

Pustike may refer to:

- Pustike, Slovenia, a village near Šmarje pri Jelšah
- Pustike, Croatia, a village near Kravarsko
