= Spodnja Ponkvica =

- Location in Slovenia
- Coordinates: 46°14′30.43″N 15°28′4.31″E
- Country: Slovenia
- Traditional region: Styria
- Statistical region: Savinja
- Municipality: Šmarje pri Jelšah

Area
  - Total: 1.66 km^{2} (0.64 sq mi)
- Elevation: 318.7 m (1,046 ft)

Population (2002)
  - Total: 71

Spodnja Ponkvica (pronounced [ˈspoːdnja ˈpoːŋkʋitsa]) is a settlement in the hills above Šentvid in the Municipality of Šmarje pri Jelšah in eastern Slovenia. The area is part of the traditional region of Styria. The municipality is now included in the Savinja Statistical Region.
