= Bukovje v Babni Gori =

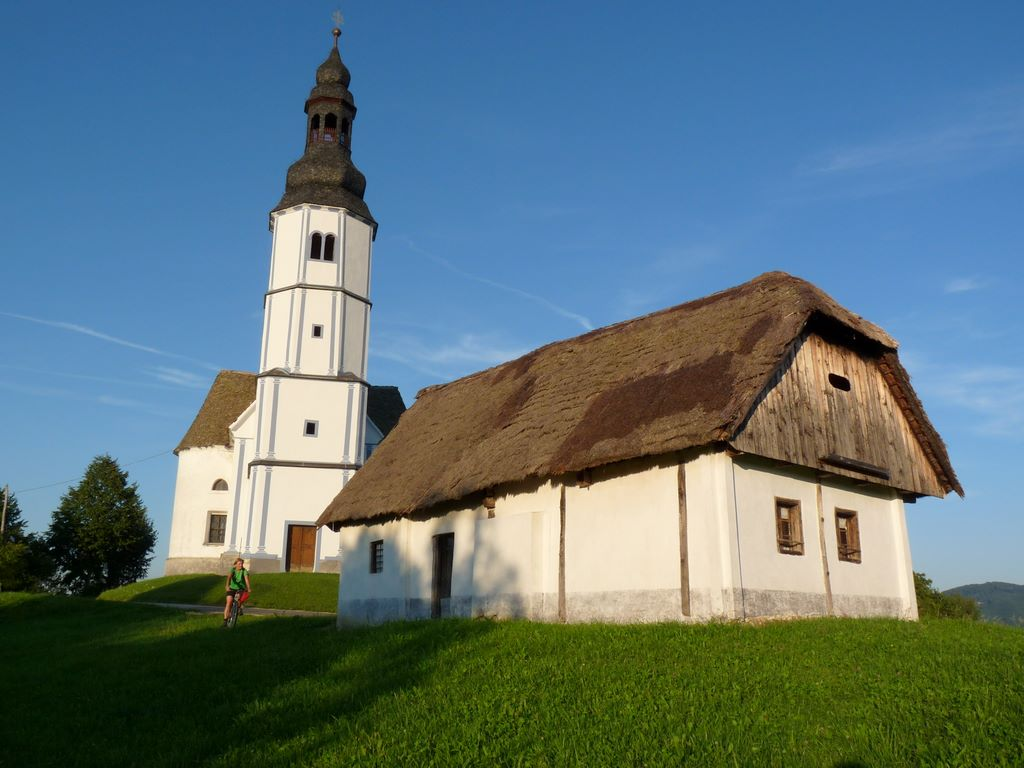

- Location in Slovenia
- Coordinates: 46°10′24.09″N 15°29′59.71″E
- Country: Slovenia
- Traditional region: Styria
- Statistical region: Savinja
- Municipality: Šmarje pri Jelšah

Area
  - Total: 1.33 km^{2} (0.51 sq mi)
- Elevation: 439.3 m (1,441 ft)

Population (2002)
  - Total: 85

Bukovje v Babni Gori (pronounced [ˈbuːkɔu̯jɛ ʍ ˈbaːbni ˈɡɔːɾi]) is a small dispersed settlement in the Kozje region (Slovene: Kozjansko) in eastern Slovenia. It lies in the Municipality of Šmarje pri Jelšah. The area is part of the traditional region of Styria. The municipality is now included in the Savinja Statistical Region.

== Name ==
The name of the settlement was changed from Bukovje to Bukovje v Babni Gori in 1953.
