= Lovrenc =

Lovrenc may refer to:

- Lovrenc Košir, Austrian civil servant who worked in Ljubljana
- Lovrenc Lavtižar (1820–1858), Slovene missionary in Minnesota, United States
- Lovrenc na Pohorju, a settlement in northeastern Slovenia

== See also ==
- Sveti Lovrenc (disambiguation), the name of several places in Slovenia
