= Senovica =

- Location in Slovenia
- Coordinates: 46°14′2.73″N 15°29′59.83″E
- Country: Slovenia
- Traditional region: Styria
- Statistical region: Savinja
- Municipality: Šmarje pri Jelšah

Area
  - Total: 1.27 km^{2} (0.49 sq mi)
- Elevation: 268.1 m (880 ft)

Population (2002)
  - Total: 119

Senovica (pronounced [sɛˈnɔːʋitsa] or [sɛˈnoːʋitsa]) is a settlement in the Municipality of Šmarje pri Jelšah in eastern Slovenia. It lies just west of the town of Šmarje on the regional road towards Celje. The railway line from Grobelno to Rogatec runs through the settlement. The area is part of the historical Styria region. The municipality is now included in the Savinja Statistical Region.
