= Škofija, Šmarje pri Jelšah =

Škofija
- Location in Slovenia
- Coordinates: 46°12′11.28″N 15°32′40.69″E
- Country: Slovenia
- Traditional region: Styria
- Statistical region: Savinja
- Municipality: Šmarje pri Jelšah

Area
  - Total: 1.23 km^{2} (0.47 sq mi)
- Elevation: 365.5 m (1,199 ft)

Population (2002)
  - Total: 113

Škofija (pronounced [ʃkɔˈfiːja]) is a small settlement in the Municipality of Šmarje pri Jelšah in eastern Slovenia. It lies in the hills north of Zibika. The municipality is included in the Savinja Statistical Region and was part of the historical region of Styria.
