= Babna Brda =

- Location in Slovenia
- Coordinates: 46°10′38.97″N 15°30′4.51″E
- Country: Slovenia
- Traditional region: Styria
- Statistical region: Savinja
- Municipality: Šmarje pri Jelšah

Area
  - Total: 1.42 km^{2} (0.55 sq mi)
- Elevation: 404.4 m (1,327 ft)

Population (2002)
  - Total: 140

Babna Brda (pronounced [ˈbaːbna ˈbəɾda]) is a settlement in the Municipality of Šmarje pri Jelšah in eastern Slovenia. It lies in the Kozje region (Slovene: Kozjansko) in the hills to the south of Šmarje. The area is part of the traditional region of Styria. The municipality is now included in the Savinja Statistical Region.
