= Platinovec =

- Location in Slovenia
- Coordinates: 46°12′48.18″N 15°27′38.25″E
- Country: Slovenia
- Traditional region: Styria
- Statistical region: Savinja
- Municipality: Šmarje pri Jelšah

Area
  - Total: 1.94 km^{2} (0.75 sq mi)
- Elevation: 369.7 m (1,213 ft)

Population (2002)
  - Total: 96

Platinovec (pronounced [plaˈtiːnɔʋəts]) is a settlement in the hills east of Grobelno in the Municipality of Šmarje pri Jelšah in eastern Slovenia. The area is part of the traditional region of Styria. The municipality is now included in the Savinja Statistical Region.
