= Lekmarje =

- Location in Slovenia
- Coordinates: 46°11′35.91″N 15°30′19.02″E
- Country: Slovenia
- Traditional region: Styria
- Statistical region: Savinja
- Municipality: Šmarje pri Jelšah

Area
  - Total: 0.96 km^{2} (0.37 sq mi)
- Elevation: 358.9 m (1,177 ft)

Population (2002)
  - Total: 45

Lekmarje (pronounced [ˈleːkmaɾjɛ]) is a small dispersed settlement in the northern part of the Kozje region (Slovene: Kozjansko) in eastern Slovenia. It lies in the Municipality of Šmarje pri Jelšah in the traditional region of Styria. The municipality is now included in the Savinja Statistical Region.
