= Mestinje =

Mestinje Zgornje Mestinje (until 1952)
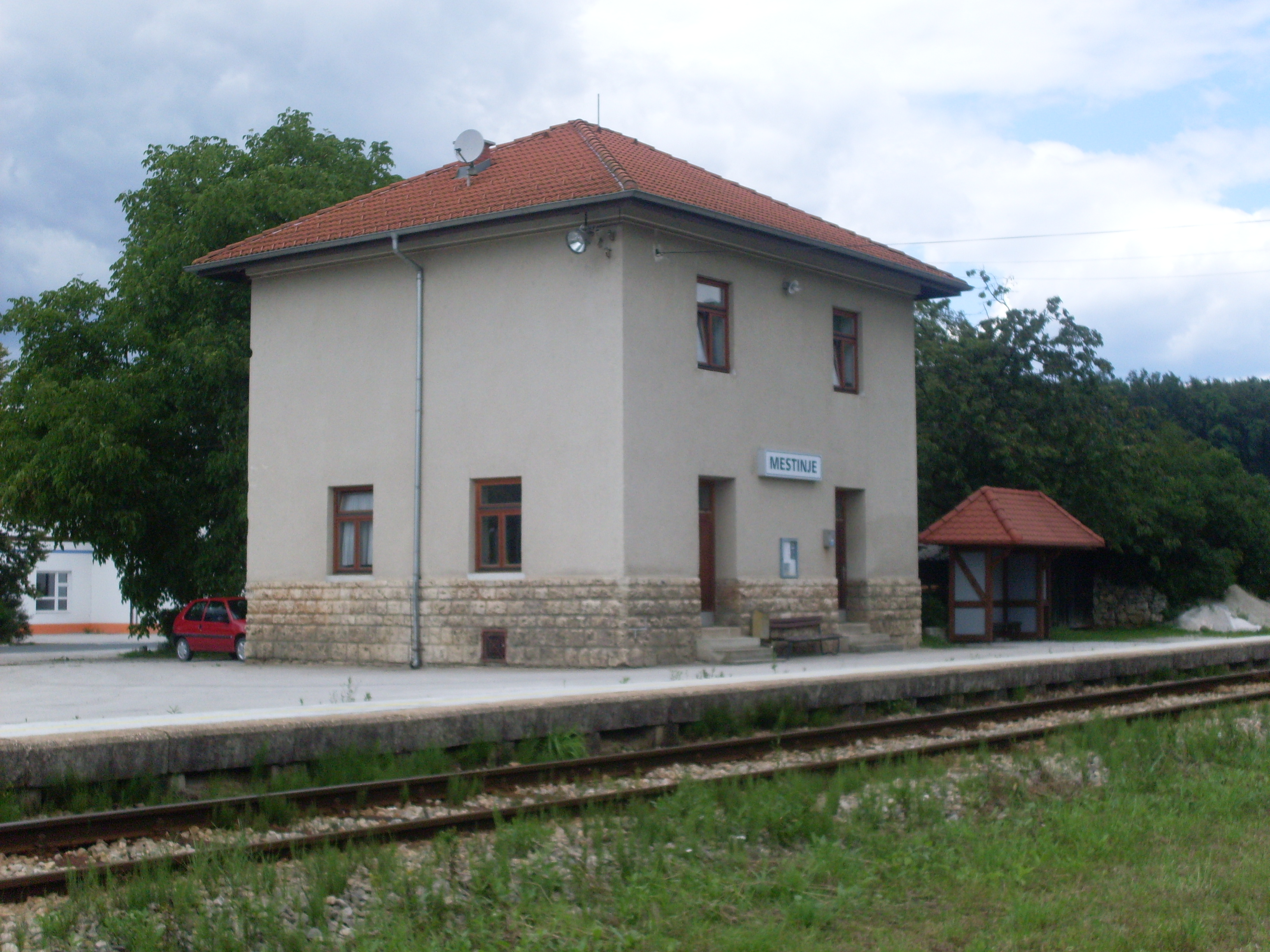
- Mestinje train station

- Location in Slovenia
- Coordinates: 46°14′10.43″N 15°33′43.96″E
- Country: Slovenia
- Traditional region: Styria
- Statistical region: Savinja
- Municipality: Šmarje pri Jelšah

Area
  - Total: 1.8 km^{2} (0.69 sq mi)
- Elevation: 229.5 m (753 ft)

Population (2002)
  - Total: 301

Mestinje (pronounced [mɛˈstiːnjɛ]) is a settlement in the Municipality of Šmarje pri Jelšah in eastern Slovenia. The area is part of the historical Styria region. The municipality is now included in the Savinja Statistical Region. It lies on the crossroads with the regional roads towards Rogaška Slatina and Podčetrtek and on the railway line from Grobelno to Rogatec.

== Name ==
The name of the settlement was changed from Zgornje Mestinje to Mestinje in 1952.

== Notable people ==
Notable people that were born or lived in Mestinje include:

- Jakob Sket (1852–1912), writer
