= Zibiška Vas =

- Location in Slovenia
- Coordinates: 46°11′26.78″N 15°33′59.54″E
- Country: Slovenia
- Traditional region: Styria
- Statistical region: Savinja
- Municipality: Šmarje pri Jelšah

Area
  - Total: 1.07 km^{2} (0.41 sq mi)
- Elevation: 209.8 m (688 ft)

Population (2002)
  - Total: 81

Zibiška Vas (pronounced [ˈziːbiʃka ˈʋaːs]; Slovene: Zibiška vas) is a small village in the Municipality of Šmarje pri Jelšah in eastern Slovenia. It lies on Zibika Creek (Slovene: Zibiški potok) west of Pristava pri Mestinju. The area is part of the traditional region of Styria. The municipality is now included in the Savinja Statistical Region.
