= Spodnje Tinsko =

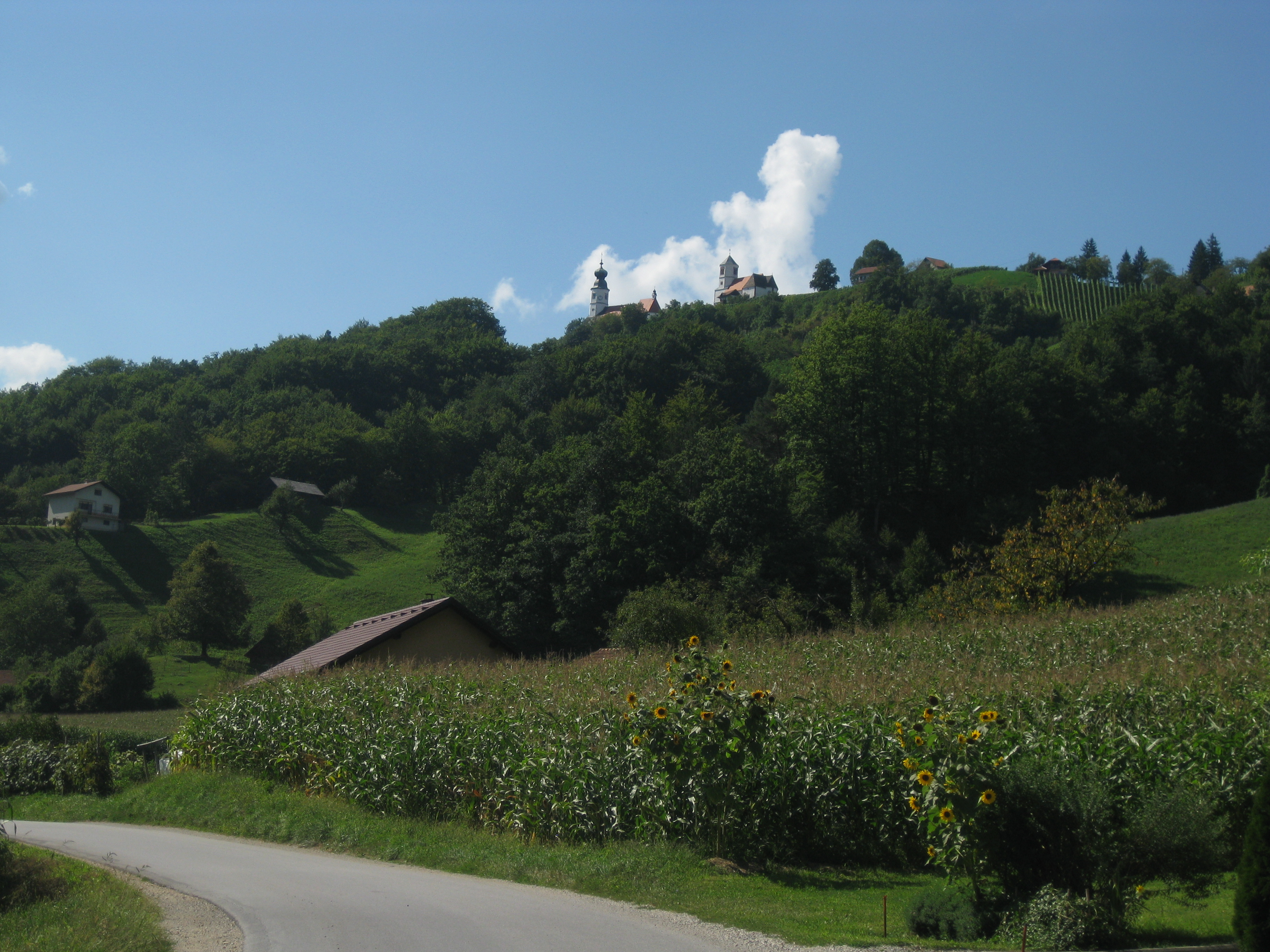

- Location in Slovenia
- Coordinates: 46°10′27.15″N 15°33′0.18″E
- Country: Slovenia
- Traditional region: Styria
- Statistical region: Savinja
- Municipality: Šmarje pri Jelšah

Area
  - Total: 2.46 km^{2} (0.95 sq mi)
- Elevation: 225.9 m (741 ft)

Population (2002)
  - Total: 77

Spodnje Tinsko (pronounced [ˈspoːdnjɛ ˈtiːnskɔ]) is a village in the Municipality of Šmarje pri Jelšah in eastern Slovenia. The area is part of the historical Styria region. The municipality is now included in the Savinja Statistical Region.

== Churches ==
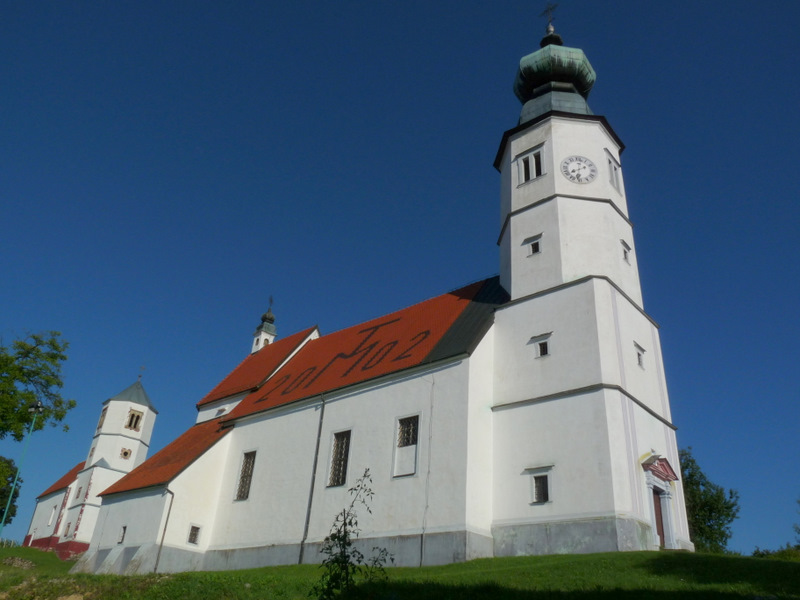
St. Anne's Church in Spodnje Tinsko; behind it, Mother of God Church

The settlement has two churches. They are built next to each other. The older church is dedicated to Saint Anne and dates to the 14th century. The second is a larger church dedicated to the Mother of God and was built in the second half of the 15th century. Both belong to the parish of Zibika.
