= Gornja Vas, Šmarje pri Jelšah =

Gornja Vas
- Location in Slovenia
- Coordinates: 46°13′33.94″N 15°28′34.63″E
- Country: Slovenia
- Traditional region: Styria
- Statistical region: Savinja
- Municipality: Šmarje pri Jelšah

Area
  - Total: 0.77 km^{2} (0.30 sq mi)
- Elevation: 313.3 m (1,028 ft)

Population (2002)
  - Total: 146

Gornja Vas (pronounced [ˈɡɔːɾnja ˈʋaːs]; Slovene: Gornja vas) is a village east of Šentvid pri Grobelnem in the Municipality of Šmarje pri Jelšah in eastern Slovenia. This village lies just south of the regional road from Celje to Šmarje pri Jelšah and railway line from Celje to Zagreb. The area is part of the traditional region of Styria. The municipality is now included in the Savinja Statistical Region.
