= Orehovec =

Orehovec may refer to:

- Orehovec, Šmarje pri Jelšah, a village in eastern Slovenia
- Orehovec, Kostanjevica na Krki, a village in the Gorjanci Mountains in Slovenia
- Orehovec, Koprivnica-Križevci County, a village in the Sveti Petar Orehovec municipality in Croatia
- Orehovec, Varaždin County, a village near Novi Marof, Croatia
- Orehovec Radobojski, a village near Radoboj, Croatia
