= Koretno =

- Location in Slovenia
- Coordinates: 46°12′36.82″N 15°33′43″E
- Country: Slovenia
- Traditional region: Styria
- Statistical region: Savinja
- Municipality: Šmarje pri Jelšah

Area
  - Total: 1.09 km^{2} (0.42 sq mi)
- Elevation: 324.3 m (1,064 ft)

Population (2002)
  - Total: 58

Koretno (pronounced [ˈkoːɾɛtnɔ]) is a settlement in the Municipality of Šmarje pri Jelšah in eastern Slovenia. It lies in the hills southeast of Šmarje, off the local road towards Pristava pri Mestinju. The area is part of the traditional region of Styria. The municipality is included in the Savinja Statistical Region.
