= Sveti Mihael =

Sveti Mihael may refer to several places in Slovenia:

- Pečica, a settlement in the Municipality of Šmarje pri Jelšah, known as Sveti Mihael until 1955
- Šmihel, Nova Gorica, a settlement in the Municipality of Nova Gorica, known as Sveti Mihael until 1955
- Sveti Mihael na Barju, the parish church in Črna Vas in the City Municipality of Ljubljana
