= Topolovec =

Topolovec is a place name that may refer to:

Places in Croatia

- Topolovec, Vrbovec, a settlement in Croatia

Places in Slovenia

- Topolovec, Koper, a settlement in southwestern Slovenia
- Topolovec, Šmarje pri Jelšah, a settlement in eastern Slovenia
