= Grobelce =

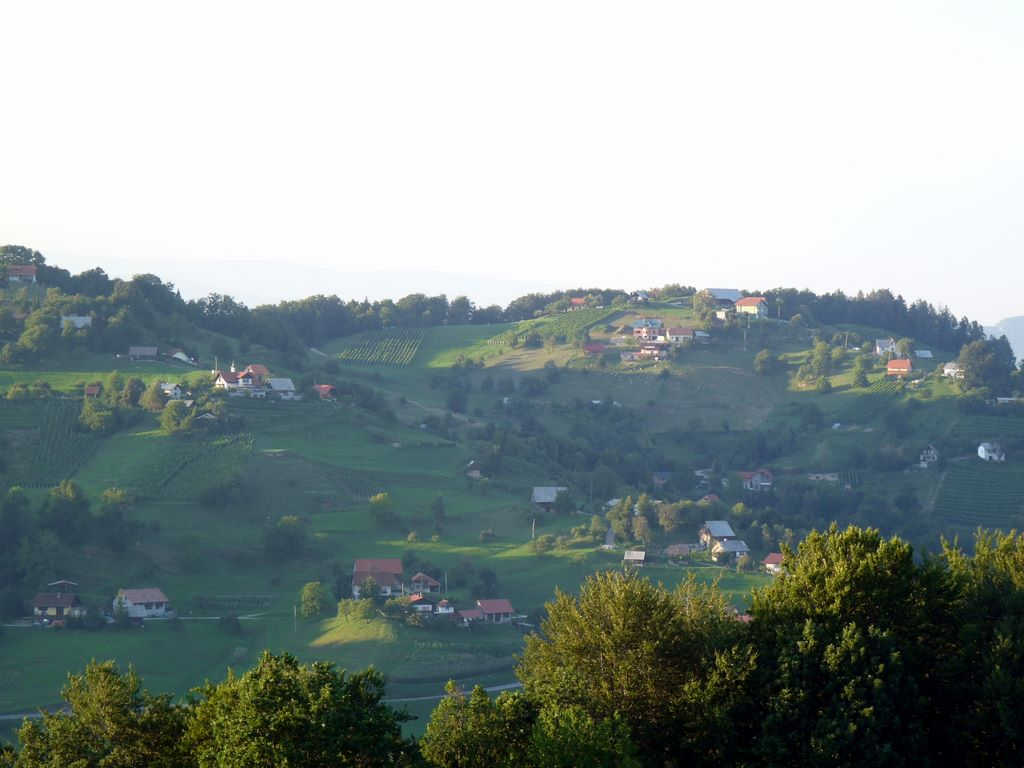

- Location in Slovenia
- Coordinates: 46°11′17.58″N 15°28′33.92″E
- Country: Slovenia
- Traditional region: Styria
- Statistical region: Savinja
- Municipality: Šmarje pri Jelšah

Area
  - Total: 2.52 km^{2} (0.97 sq mi)
- Elevation: 415.5 m (1,363 ft)

Population (2002)
  - Total: 188

Grobelce (pronounced [ˈɡɾoːbəltsɛ]) is a settlement in the Municipality of Šmarje pri Jelšah in eastern Slovenia. It lies in the northern part of the Kozje region (Slovene: Kozjansko) in the traditional region of Styria. The municipality is included in the Savinja Statistical Region.
