= Nova Vas pri Šmarju =

- Location in Slovenia
- Coordinates: 46°15′20.72″N 15°31′27.86″E
- Country: Slovenia
- Traditional region: Styria
- Statistical region: Savinja
- Municipality: Šmarje pri Jelšah

Area
  - Total: 0.95 km^{2} (0.37 sq mi)
- Elevation: 247.2 m (811 ft)

Population (2002)
  - Total: 63

Nova Vas pri Šmarju (pronounced [ˈnɔːʋa ˈʋaːs pɾi ˈʃmaːɾju]; Slovene: Nova vas pri Šmarju) is a small settlement in the Municipality of Šmarje pri Jelšah in eastern Slovenia. It lies in the hills north of Šmarje on the road to Sladka Gora. The area is part of the historical region of Styria and is now included in the Savinja Statistical Region.

== Name ==
The name of the settlement was changed from Nova vas to Nova vas pri Šmarju in 1953.
