= Vršna Vas =

Vršna Vas Sveta Magdalena pri Zibikih (until 1955)
- Location in Slovenia
- Coordinates: 46°11′34.8″N 15°32′1.62″E
- Country: Slovenia
- Traditional region: Styria
- Statistical region: Savinja
- Municipality: Šmarje pri Jelšah

Area
  - Total: 1.37 km^{2} (0.53 sq mi)
- Elevation: 277.2 m (909 ft)

Population (2002)
  - Total: 120

Vršna Vas (pronounced [ˈʋəɾʃna ˈʋaːs]; Slovene: Vršna vas) is a dispersed settlement in the hills south of Šmarje pri Jelšah in eastern Slovenia. The area is part of Styria and is included in the Savinja Statistical Region. It is a scattered village on a ridge and slope on either side of Zibika Creek (Slovene: Zibiški potok). It includes the hamlets of Planinca and Sveta Magdalena.

== Name ==
The name of the settlement was changed from Sveta Magdalena pri Zibikih (literally, 'Saint Mary Magdalene near Zibika') to Vršna vas (literally, 'peak village') in 1955. The name was changed on the basis of the 1948 Law on Names of Settlements and Designations of Squares, Streets, and Buildings as part of efforts by Slovenia's postwar communist government to remove religious elements from toponyms. Before Vršna vas became the name of the entire settlement, the name used to refer to one of the hamlets in the settlement.

== Notable people ==
Notable people that were born or lived in Vršna Vas include:

- Jakob Palir (1866–1957), religious writer and editor
