= Predel =

Predel (Cyrillic: Предел), a Slavic word for "bound, limit", may refer to:

- Predel (Bulgaria), a saddle and mountain pass dividing the Rila and Pirin mountains
  - Predel Point on Anvers Island in Antarctica, named after Predel in Bulgaria
- Predil Pass, a mountain pass between Slovenia and Italy
- Predeal, a town and mountain resort in Romania
- Predel, Šmarje pri Jelšah, a settlement in Slovenia
