= Jerovska Vas =

- Location in Slovenia
- Coordinates: 46°16′1.91″N 15°32′25.7″E
- Country: Slovenia
- Traditional region: Styria
- Statistical region: Savinja
- Municipality: Šmarje pri Jelšah

Area
  - Total: 0.51 km^{2} (0.20 sq mi)
- Elevation: 335.4 m (1,100 ft)

Population (2002)
  - Total: 24

Jerovska Vas (pronounced [jɛˈɾoːu̯ska ˈʋaːs]; Slovene: Jerovska vas) is a small dispersed settlement east of Sladka Gora in the Municipality of Šmarje pri Jelšah in eastern Slovenia. The area is part of the traditional region of Styria. The municipality is now included in the Savinja Statistical Region.
