= Orehova Vas =

Orehova Vas (Slovene: Orehova vas) may refer to several places in Slovenia:

- Orehova Vas, Hoče–Slivnica, a settlement in the Municipality of Hoče–Slivnica
- Orehova Vas, Pečica, a hamlet of Pečica in the Municipality of Šmarje pri Jelšah
