= Krtince =

- Location in Slovenia
- Coordinates: 46°14′57.61″N 15°34′6.39″E
- Country: Slovenia
- Traditional region: Styria
- Statistical region: Savinja
- Municipality: Šmarje pri Jelšah

Area
  - Total: 0.9 km^{2} (0.35 sq mi)
- Elevation: 253.6 m (832 ft)

Population (2002)
  - Total: 110

Krtince (pronounced [kəɾˈtiːntsɛ]) is a small settlement in the Municipality of Šmarje pri Jelšah in eastern Slovenia. It lies just off the main road from Šmarje towards Rogaška Slatina. The area is part of the traditional region of Styria. The municipality is now included in the Savinja Statistical Region.

The local church is dedicated to Saint Benedict and belongs to the Parish of Sladka Gora. It dates to the 15th century with 17th-century adaptations.
