= Strtenica =

- Location in Slovenia
- Coordinates: 46°11′36.23″N 15°31′31.32″E
- Country: Slovenia
- Traditional region: Styria
- Statistical region: Savinja
- Municipality: Šmarje pri Jelšah

Area
  - Total: 2 km^{2} (0.77 sq mi)
- Elevation: 275 m (902 ft)

Population (2002)
  - Total: 97

Strtenica (pronounced [stəɾtɛˈniːtsa]) is a small settlement in the Kozje region (Slovene: Kozjansko) in eastern Slovenia. It belongs to the Municipality of Šmarje pri Jelšah. The municipality is part of the historical Styria region and is now included in the Savinja Statistical Region.
