= Lopaca =

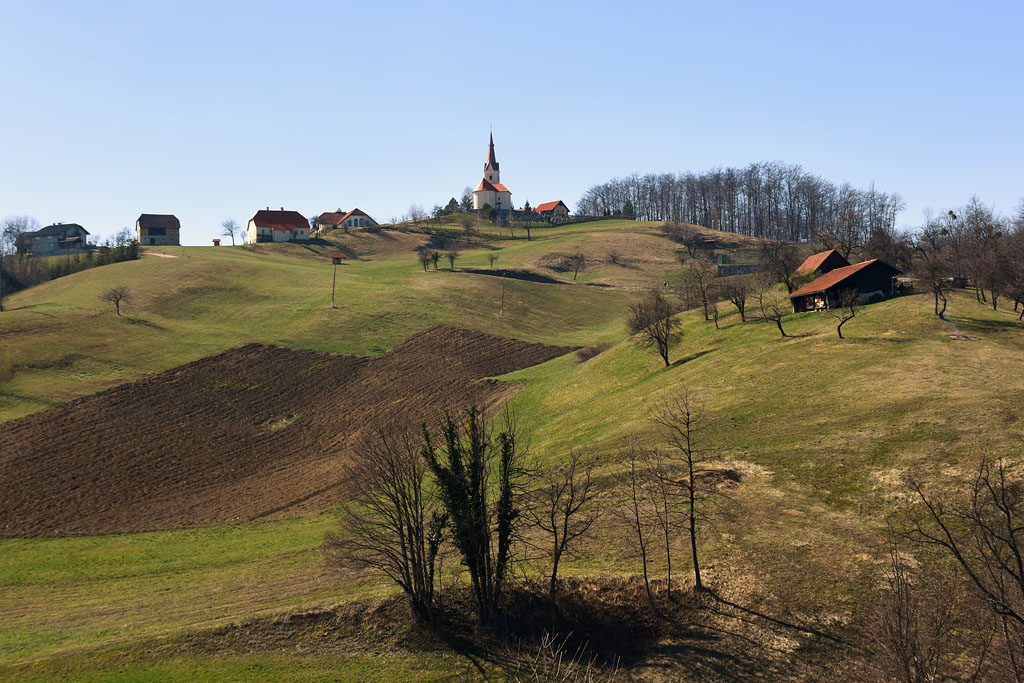
- Lopaca

- Location in Slovenia
- Coordinates: 46°7′26.98″N 15°28′35.23″E
- Country: Slovenia
- Traditional region: Styria
- Statistical region: Savinja
- Municipality: Šentjur

Area
  - Total: 1.77 km^{2} (0.68 sq mi)
- Elevation: 501.6 m (1,646 ft)

Population (2020)
  - Total: 136
  - Density: 76.8/km^{2} (199/sq mi)

Lopaca (pronounced [lɔˈpaːtsa]) is a village in the Municipality of Šentjur in eastern Slovenia. It lies just off the regional road leading south out of the town of Šentjur towards Kozje. The settlement, and the entire municipality, are included in the Savinja Statistical Region, which is in the Slovenian portion of the historical Duchy of Styria.

== Church ==
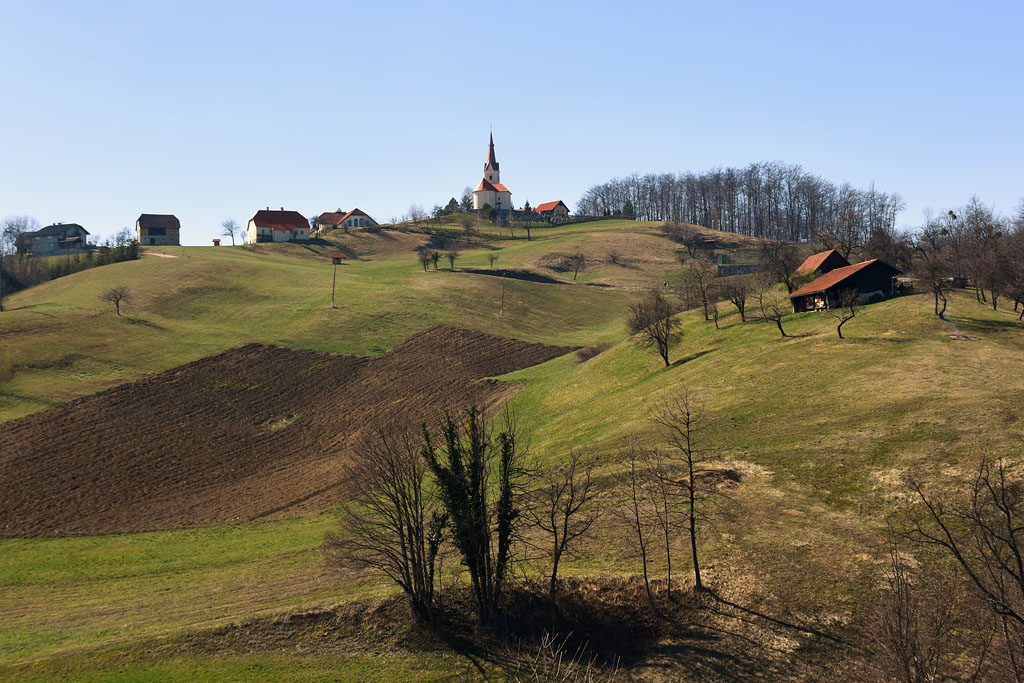
Saint Anne's Church

The local parish church is dedicated to Saint Anne and belongs to the Roman Catholic Diocese of Celje. It was built in the early 19th century on the site of a 15th-century predecessor.
