= Spodnje Selce =

- Location in Slovenia
- Coordinates: 46°13′43.08″N 15°26′57.64″E
- Country: Slovenia
- Traditional region: Styria
- Statistical region: Savinja
- Municipality: Šmarje pri Jelšah

Area
  - Total: 0.98 km^{2} (0.38 sq mi)
- Elevation: 275.5 m (904 ft)

Population (2002)
  - Total: 48

Spodnje Selce (pronounced [ˈspoːdnjɛ ˈseːu̯tsɛ]) is a small settlement west of Šentvid in the Municipality of Šmarje pri Jelšah in eastern Slovenia. The area is part of the traditional region of Styria and is now included in the Savinja Statistical Region.
