= Brecljevo =

Brecljevo Sveti Tomaž pri Šmarju (until 1955)
- Location in Slovenia
- Coordinates: 46°13′11.67″N 15°31′55.56″E
- Country: Slovenia
- Traditional region: Styria
- Statistical region: Savinja
- Municipality: Šmarje pri Jelšah

Area
  - Total: 1.23 km^{2} (0.47 sq mi)
- Elevation: 297.5 m (976 ft)

Population (2002)
  - Total: 167

Brecljevo (pronounced [ˈbɾeːtsljɛʋɔ]) is a settlement in the Municipality of Šmarje pri Jelšah in eastern Slovenia. It lies in the hills south of Šmarje. The area is part of the traditional region of Styria. The municipality is now included in the Savinja Statistical Region.

== Name ==
The name of the settlement was changed from Sveti Tomaž pri Šmarju (literally, 'Saint Thomas near Šmarje') to Brecljevo in 1955. The name was changed on the basis of the 1948 Law on Names of Settlements and Designations of Squares, Streets, and Buildings as part of efforts by Slovenia's postwar communist government to remove religious elements from toponyms.

== Church ==
The local church is dedicated to Saint Thomas and belongs to the Parish of Šmarje pri Jelšah. It dates originally to the 15th century but was extensively rebuilt in the 17th and 18th centuries.
