= Stranje, Šmarje pri Jelšah =

Stranje
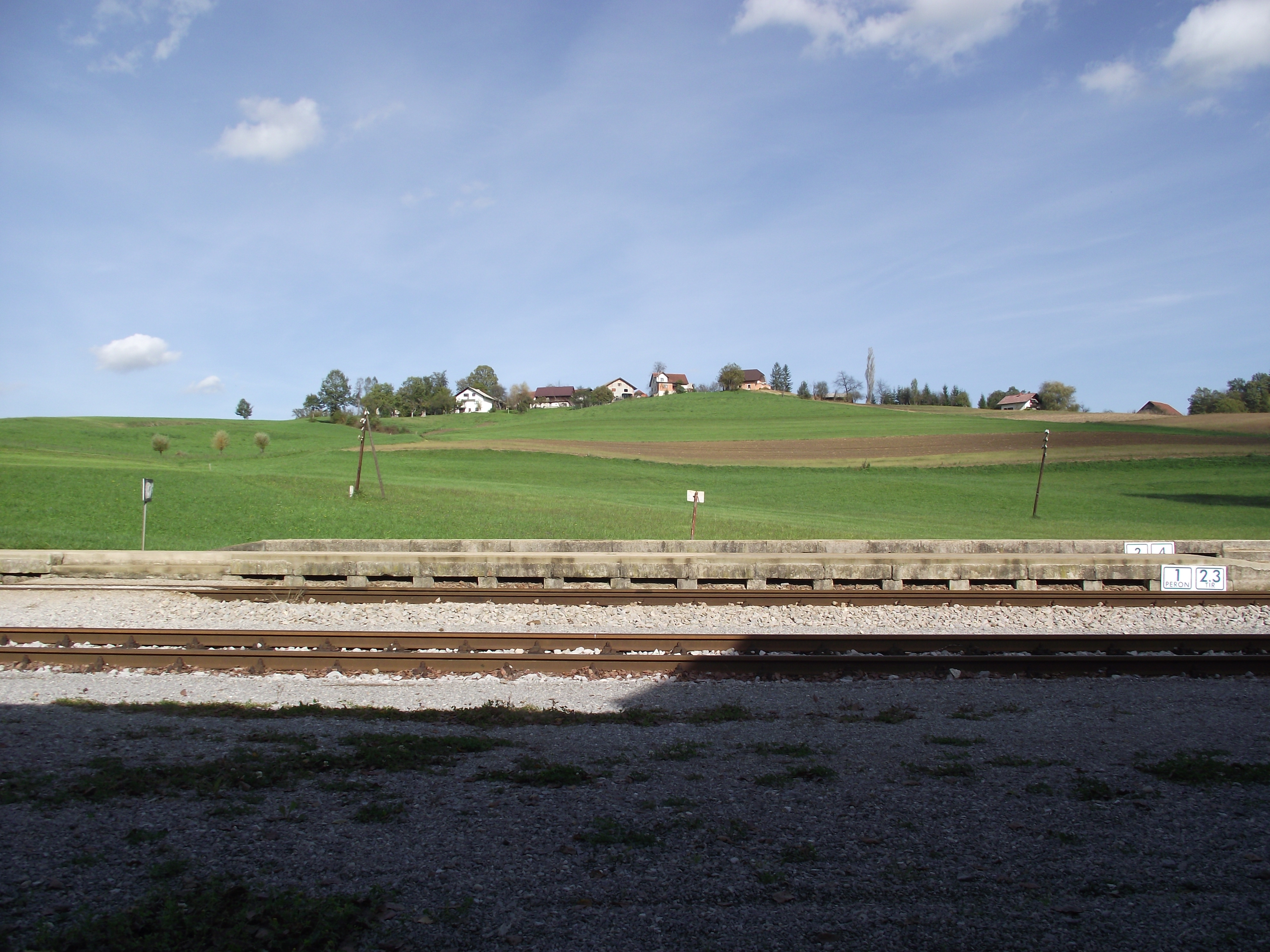

- Location in Slovenia
- Coordinates: 46°13′21.86″N 15°33′41.13″E
- Country: Slovenia
- Traditional region: Styria
- Statistical region: Savinja
- Municipality: Šmarje pri Jelšah

Area
  - Total: 1.23 km^{2} (0.47 sq mi)
- Elevation: 259 m (850 ft)

Population (2002)
  - Total: 153

Stranje pronounced [ˈstɾaːnjɛ] is a settlement in the Municipality of Šmarje pri Jelšah in eastern Slovenia. It lies southeast of Šmarje. The entire area is part of the historical Styria region. The municipality is now included in the Savinja Statistical Region.
