= Sotensko pri Šmarju =

- Location in Slovenia
- Coordinates: 46°14′35.9″N 15°30′42.62″E
- Country: Slovenia
- Traditional region: Styria
- Statistical region: Savinja
- Municipality: Šmarje pri Jelšah

Area
  - Total: 1.53 km^{2} (0.59 sq mi)
- Elevation: 329.4 m (1,081 ft)

Population (2002)
  - Total: 106

Sotensko pri Šmarju (pronounced [ˈsoːtɛnskɔ pɾi ˈʃmaːɾju]) is a settlement in the Municipality of Šmarje pri Jelšah in eastern Slovenia. It lies in the hills north of Šmarje. The area is part of the historical Styria region. The municipality is now included in the Savinja Statistical Region.

== Name ==
The name of the settlement was changed from Sotensko to Sotensko pri Šmarju in 1953.

== Church ==
The local church is dedicated to Saint Nicholas and belongs to the Parish of Šmarje pri Jelšah. It was built in the third quarter of the 18th century on the site of an earlier building.
