= Pustike, Slovenia =

Pustike
- Location in Slovenia
- Coordinates: 46°11′58.35″N 15°33′29.08″E
- Country: Slovenia
- Traditional region: Styria
- Statistical region: Savinja
- Municipality: Šmarje pri Jelšah

Area
  - Total: 1.11 km^{2} (0.43 sq mi)
- Elevation: 293 m (961 ft)

Population (2002)
  - Total: 99

Pustike (pronounced [puˈstiːkɛ] or [ˈpuːstikɛ]) is a dispersed settlement in the Municipality of Šmarje pri Jelšah in eastern Slovenia. It lies in the hills northeast of Zibika. The area is part of the historical Styria region and is now included in the Savinja Statistical Region.
