= Jazbina, Šmarje pri Jelšah =

Jazbina
- Location in Slovenia
- Coordinates: 46°13′5.03″N 15°32′31.43″E
- Country: Slovenia
- Traditional region: Styria
- Statistical region: Savinja
- Municipality: Šmarje pri Jelšah

Area
  - Total: 0.31 km^{2} (0.12 sq mi)
- Elevation: 256.5 m (842 ft)

Population (2002)
  - Total: 41

Jazbina (pronounced [ˈjaːzbina]) is a small settlement in the Municipality of Šmarje pri Jelšah in the traditional region of Styria in eastern Slovenia. The area is part of the Savinja Statistical Region.
