= Belo, Šmarje pri Jelšah =

Belo
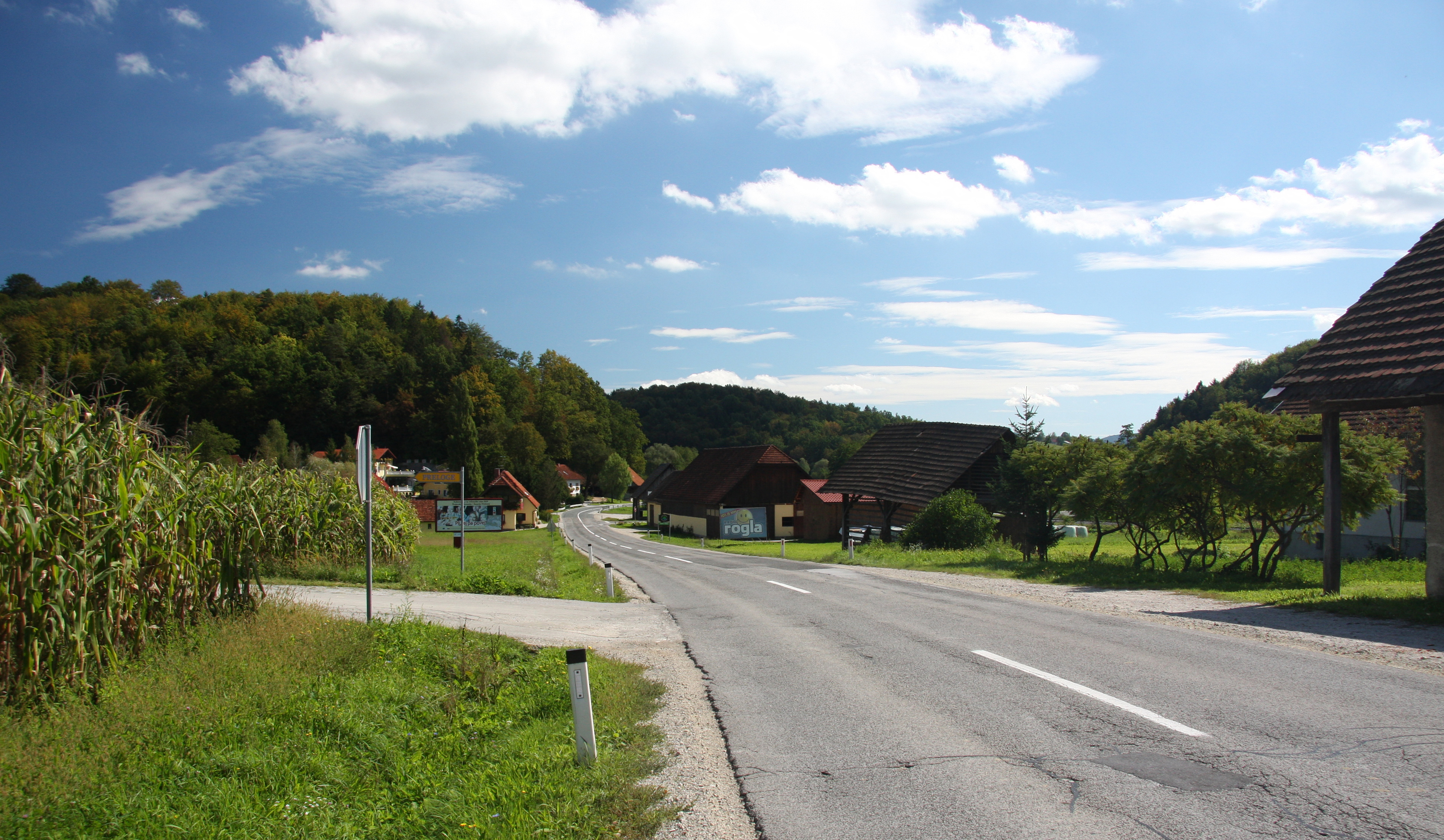

- Location in Slovenia
- Coordinates: 46°13′48.94″N 15°32′59.4″E
- Country: Slovenia
- Traditional region: Styria
- Statistical region: Savinja
- Municipality: Šmarje pri Jelšah

Area
  - Total: 1.24 km^{2} (0.48 sq mi)
- Elevation: 219 m (719 ft)

Population (2002)
  - Total: 134

Belo (pronounced [ˈbeːlɔ]) is a settlement in the Municipality of Šmarje pri Jelšah in eastern Slovenia. It lies just east of Šmarje on the main road toward Rogaška Slatina. The area is part of the traditional region of Styria. The municipality is now included in the Savinja Statistical Region.
