= Orehovec, Šmarje pri Jelšah =

Orehovec Šent Janž pri Podčetrtku (until 1955)
- Location in Slovenia
- Coordinates: 46°10′43″N 15°31′40″E
- Country: Slovenia
- Traditional region: Styria
- Statistical region: Savinja
- Municipality: Šmarje pri Jelšah

Area
  - Total: 1.39 km^{2} (0.54 sq mi)
- Elevation: 403.3 m (1,323 ft)

Population (2002)
  - Total: 66

Orehovec (pronounced [ɔˈɾeːxɔʋəts]) is a settlement in the Municipality of Šmarje pri Jelšah in eastern Slovenia. The area is part of the historical Styria region. The municipality is now included in the Savinja Statistical Region.

== Name ==
The name of the settlement was changed from Šent Janž pri Podčetrtku (literally, 'Saint John near Podčetrtek') to Orehovec (literally, 'walnut-place') in 1955. The name was changed on the basis of the 1948 Law on Names of Settlements and Designations of Squares, Streets, and Buildings as part of efforts by Slovenia's postwar communist government to remove religious elements from toponyms.

== Church ==
The local church is dedicated to the Nativity of Saint John the Baptist and belongs to the Parish of Sveti Štefan pri Žusmu. It is a Late Gothic church that was extended in the 18th century.
