= Hajnsko =

- Location in Slovenia
- Coordinates: 46°12′27.26″N 15°35′21.81″E
- Country: Slovenia
- Traditional region: Styria
- Statistical region: Savinja
- Municipality: Šmarje pri Jelšah

Area
  - Total: 2.29 km^{2} (0.88 sq mi)
- Elevation: 210.1 m (689 ft)

Population (2002)
  - Total: 153

Hajnsko (pronounced [ˈxaːi̯nskɔ]) is a settlement in the Municipality of Šmarje pri Jelšah in eastern Slovenia. It lies in the hills southeast of Šmarje on both banks of Hajnsko Creek (Slovene: Hajnski potok). The area is part of the traditional region of Styria. The municipality is now included in the Savinja Statistical Region.
