= Babna Gora, Šmarje pri Jelšah =

Babna Gora
- Location in Slovenia
- Coordinates: 46°10′24.09″N 15°29′59.71″E
- Country: Slovenia
- Traditional region: Styria
- Statistical region: Savinja
- Municipality: Šmarje pri Jelšah

Area
  - Total: 4.32 km^{2} (1.67 sq mi)
- Elevation: 382.3 m (1,254 ft)

Population (2002)
  - Total: 112

Babna Gora (pronounced [ˈbaːbna ˈɡɔːɾa]) is a settlement in the Municipality of Šmarje pri Jelšah in eastern Slovenia. It lies in the hills south of Šmarje in the Kozje region (Slovene: Kozjansko). The area is part of the traditional region of Styria. The municipality is now included in the Savinja Statistical Region.

The local church is dedicated to Saint Anne and belongs to the Parish of Sveti Štefan pri Žusmu. It was first mentioned in written documents dating to 1490. It was rebuilt at the beginning of the 18th century.
