= Vinski Vrh pri Šmarju =

Vinski Vrh pri Šmarju Sveta Barbara (until 1955)
- Location in Slovenia
- Coordinates: 46°13′18.84″N 15°30′36.3″E
- Country: Slovenia
- Traditional region: Styria
- Statistical region: Savinja
- Municipality: Šmarje pri Jelšah

Area
  - Total: 0.34 km^{2} (0.13 sq mi)
- Elevation: 338 m (1,109 ft)

Population (2002)
  - Total: 73

Vinski Vrh pri Šmarju (pronounced [ˈʋiːnski ˈʋəɾx pɾi ˈʃmaːɾju]) is a small settlement in the Municipality of Šmarje pri Jelšah in eastern Slovenia. It lies in the hills south of Šmarje. The area is part of the historical Styria region. The municipality is now included in the Savinja Statistical Region.

== Name ==
The name of the settlement was changed from Sveta Barbara (literally, 'Saint Barbara') to Vinski Vrh pri Šmarju (literally, 'wine mountain near Šmarje') in 1955. The name was changed on the basis of the 1948 Law on Names of Settlements and Designations of Squares, Streets, and Buildings as part of efforts by Slovenia's postwar communist government to remove religious elements from toponyms.

== Church ==
The local church is dedicated to Saint Barbara and belongs to the Parish of Šmarje pri Jelšah. The oldest parts of the church date to around 1400, but most of the building is from the early 16th century with two chapels added in the 18th century.
