= Zadrže =

- Location in Slovenia
- Coordinates: 46°13′29.27″N 15°30′22.4″E
- Country: Slovenia
- Traditional region: Styria
- Statistical region: Savinja
- Municipality: Šmarje pri Jelšah

Area
  - Total: 0.78 km^{2} (0.30 sq mi)
- Elevation: 240.1 m (788 ft)

Population (2002)
  - Total: 60

Zadrže (pronounced [ˈzaːdəɾʒɛ], German: Sadersche) is a settlement immediately west of Šmarje pri Jelšah in eastern Slovenia. The entire area of the Municipality of Šmarje pri Jelšah is part of the traditional region of Styria and is now included in the Savinja Statistical Region.
