= Dvor, Šmarje pri Jelšah =

Dvor
- Location in Slovenia
- Coordinates: 46°14′19.15″N 15°30′20.99″E
- Country: Slovenia
- Traditional region: Styria
- Statistical region: Savinja
- Municipality: Šmarje pri Jelšah

Area
  - Total: 1.02 km^{2} (0.39 sq mi)
- Elevation: 245.4 m (805 ft)

Population (2002)
  - Total: 180

Dvor (pronounced [ˈdʋoːɾ] or [ˈdʋɔɾ]) is a settlement in the Municipality of Šmarje pri Jelšah in eastern Slovenia. It lies on a small stream named Dvor Creek (Slovene: Dvorski potok) after the settlement itself northwest of Šmarje pri Jelšah. The area is part of the traditional region of Styria. The municipality is now included in the Savinja Statistical Region.
