= Korpule =

- Location in Slovenia
- Coordinates: 46°13′42.72″N 15°32′7.07″E
- Country: Slovenia
- Traditional region: Styria
- Statistical region: Savinja
- Municipality: Šmarje pri Jelšah

Area
  - Total: 0.87 km^{2} (0.34 sq mi)
- Elevation: 271.7 m (891 ft)

Population (2002)
  - Total: 80

Korpule (pronounced [ˈkoːɾpulɛ]) is a settlement in the Municipality of Šmarje pri Jelšah in eastern Slovenia. It lies in the hills above the right bank of Šmarje Creek (Slovene: Šmarski potok) east of Šmarje itself. The area is part of the traditional region of Styria and is now included in the Savinja Statistical Region.
