= Predenca =

- Location in Slovenia
- Coordinates: 46°13′18.95″N 15°31′23.9″E
- Country: Slovenia
- Traditional region: Styria
- Statistical region: Savinja
- Municipality: Šmarje pri Jelšah

Area
  - Total: 0.94 km^{2} (0.36 sq mi)
- Elevation: 335.9 m (1,102 ft)

Population (2002)
  - Total: 144

Predenca (pronounced [ˈpɾeːdɛntsa]) is a settlement in the Municipality of Šmarje pri Jelšah in eastern Slovenia. It stands on a hill south of Šmarje. The area is part of the historical Styria region. The municipality is now included in the Savinja Statistical Region.

== Landmarks ==
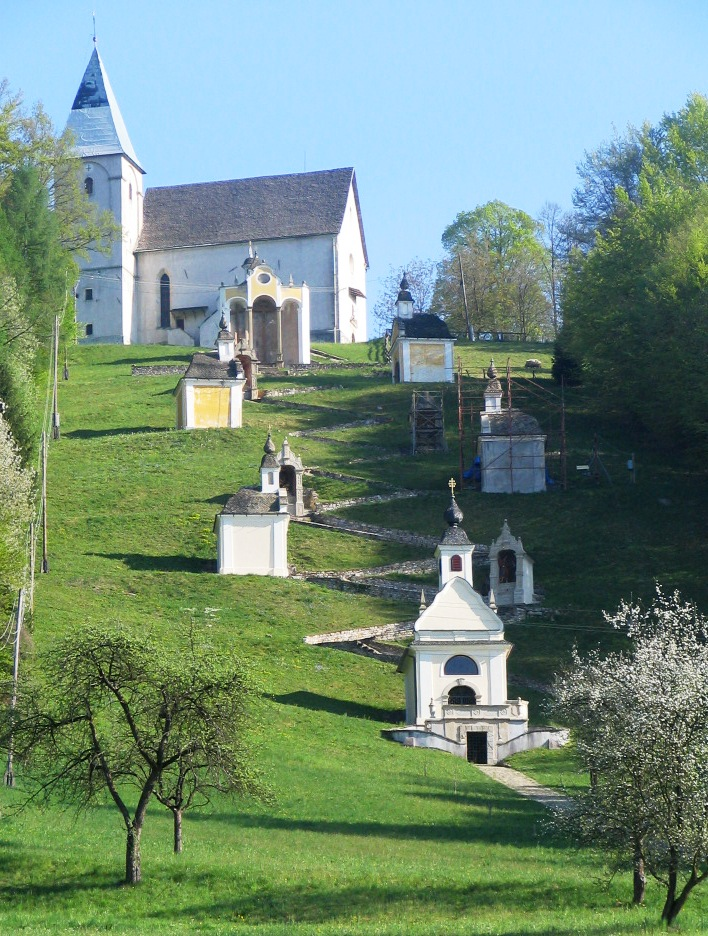
Series of chapels in Šmarje pri Jelšah and Saint Roch's Church in Predenca

=== Church ===
The local church is one of the local landmarks. It is dedicated to Saint Roch and the path leading up the hill from Šmarje pri Jelšah is lined with fourteen chapels representing Calvary and the Stations of the Cross. The church dates to the mid-17th century and the chapels were built between 1743 and 1753.
