= Konuško =

- Location in Slovenia
- Coordinates: 46°12′25.64″N 15°33′11.63″E
- Country: Slovenia
- Traditional region: Styria
- Statistical region: Savinja
- Municipality: Šmarje pri Jelšah

Area
  - Total: 0.75 km^{2} (0.29 sq mi)
- Elevation: 341.7 m (1,121 ft)

Population (2002)
  - Total: 23

Konuško (pronounced [kɔˈnuːʃkɔ]) is a small dispersed settlement in the Municipality of Šmarje pri Jelšah in eastern Slovenia. It lies in the hills south of Šmarje in the traditional region of Styria. With the division of Slovenia into statistical regions in 2007 the entire municipality was included in the Savinja Statistical Region.
