= Predel, Šmarje pri Jelšah =

Predel
- Location in Slovenia
- Coordinates: 46°13′23.08″N 15°29′16.07″E
- Country: Slovenia
- Traditional region: Styria
- Statistical region: Savinja
- Municipality: Šmarje pri Jelšah

Area
  - Total: 1.09 km^{2} (0.42 sq mi)
- Elevation: 321.8 m (1,056 ft)

Population (2002)
  - Total: 87

Predel (pronounced [pɾɛˈdeːl]) is a small settlement in the Municipality of Šmarje pri Jelšah in eastern Slovenia. It lies just south of the regional road from Šmarje towards Grobelno in the historical Styria region. The municipality is now included in the Savinja Statistical Region.
