= Bezgovica, Šmarje pri Jelšah =

Bezgovica
- Location in Slovenia
- Coordinates: 46°11′0.31″N 15°33′34.92″E
- Country: Slovenia
- Traditional region: Styria
- Statistical region: Savinja
- Municipality: Šmarje pri Jelšah

Area
  - Total: 0.56 km^{2} (0.22 sq mi)
- Elevation: 301.9 m (990 ft)

Population (2002)
  - Total: 21

Bezgovica (pronounced [bəzɡɔˈʋiːtsa]) is a small settlement in the Municipality of Šmarje pri Jelšah in eastern Slovenia. The municipality is included in the Savinja Statistical Region. The area is part of the traditional region of Styria.
