= Sveti Lovrenc =

Sveti Lovrenc may refer to several places in Slovenia:

- Lovrenc na Dravskem Polju, a settlement in the Municipality of Kidričevo, known as Sveti Lovrenc na Dravskem Polju until 1952
- Lovrenc na Pohorju, a settlement in the Municipality of Lovrenc na Pohorju, known as Sveti Lovrenc na Pohorju until 1952
- Močle, a settlement in the Municipality of Šmarje pri Jelšah, known as Sveti Lovrenc pri Šmarju until 1955
- Sveti Lovrenc, Prebold, a settlement in the Municipality of Prebold
