= Vodenovo =

- Location in Slovenia
- Coordinates: 46°15′2.35″N 15°29′53.84″E
- Country: Slovenia
- Traditional region: Styria
- Statistical region: Savinja
- Municipality: Šmarje pri Jelšah

Area
  - Total: 1.07 km^{2} (0.41 sq mi)
- Elevation: 382.2 m (1,254 ft)

Population (2002)
  - Total: 87

Vodenovo (pronounced [ʋɔdɛˈnɔːʋɔ] or [ʋɔdɛˈnoːʋɔ]) is a small settlement in the hills northwest of Šmarje pri Jelšah in eastern Slovenia. The area was historically part of the Styria region and is now included in the Savinja Statistical Region.
