= Saša Vegri =

- Born: 12 February 1934; Belgrade, Kingdom of Yugoslavia (now in Serbia)
- Died: 29 August 2010 (aged 76); Ljubljana, Slovenia
- Occupation: poet
- Writing career
- Notable works: Mama pravi, da v očkovi glavi
- Notable awards: Levstik Award; 1979 for Mama pravi, da v očkovi glavi
- Literary movement: Intimism

Saša Vegri (true name Albina Vodopivec, née Doberšek) (12 February 1934 – 29 August 2010) was a Slovene poet who is also known for her books for young readers.

Vegri was born in Belgrade in 1934. In 1941, her family returned to Sveti Štefan and she went to school in Celje and Ljubljana. She worked as a freelance writer and a librarian. She first published her poetry in various journals in the mid-1950s. At the same time, she started writing for children and young adults.

She won the Levstik Award in 1979 for her work Mama pravi, da v očkovi glavi (Mum Said that in Dad's Head).

== Published works ==
=== Poetry for adults ===
- Mesečni konj (The Moon Horse), 1958
- Naplavljeni plen (the Washed Up Loot), 1961
- Zajtrkujem v urejenem naročju (I Take My Breakfast in My Tidy Lap), 1967
- Ofelija in trojni aksel (Ophelia and the Triple Axel), 1977
- Konstelacije (Constellations), 1980

=== Poetry for children ===
- Jure Kvak-Kvak (George Quack-Quack), 1975
- Mama pravi, da v očkovi glavi (Mum Said that in Dad's Head), 1978
- To niso pesmi za otroke ali kako se dela otroke (These Are Not Poems For Children Or on How You make Children), 1983
- Kaj se zgodi, če kdo ne spi (What Can Happen If One Doesn't Sleep), 1991
