= Dol pri Šmarju =

- Location in Slovenia
- Coordinates: 46°12′39.72″N 15°31′31.46″E
- Country: Slovenia
- Traditional region: Styria
- Statistical region: Savinja
- Municipality: Šmarje pri Jelšah

Area
  - Total: 1.78 km^{2} (0.69 sq mi)
- Elevation: 243.3 m (798 ft)

Population (2002)
  - Total: 78

Dol pri Šmarju (pronounced [ˈdoːl pɾi ˈʃmaːɾju]) is a settlement in the hills south of Šmarje pri Jelšah in eastern Slovenia. The Municipality of Šmarje pri Jelšah is included in the Savinja Statistical Region. It is part of the historical Styria region.

== Name ==
The name of the settlement was changed from Dol to Dol pri Šmarju in 1953.
