= Dragomilo =

- Location in Slovenia
- Coordinates: 46°12′43.07″N 15°32′17.21″E
- Country: Slovenia
- Traditional region: Styria
- Statistical region: Savinja
- Municipality: Šmarje pri Jelšah

Area
  - Total: 0.81 km^{2} (0.31 sq mi)
- Elevation: 221.7 m (727 ft)

Population (2002)
  - Total: 35

Dragomilo (pronounced [ˈdɾaːɡɔmilɔ]) is a small settlement in the Municipality of Šmarje pri Jelšah in eastern Slovenia. It lies in the small valley of Dragomilo Creek (Slovene: Dragomilski potok) in the hills south of Šmarje. The area is part of the traditional region of Styria and is now included in the Savinja Statistical Region.
