= Šerovo =

- Location in Slovenia
- Coordinates: 46°12′49.6″N 15°33′12.8″E
- Country: Slovenia
- Traditional region: Styria
- Statistical region: Savinja
- Municipality: Šmarje pri Jelšah

Area
  - Total: 1.65 km^{2} (0.64 sq mi)
- Elevation: 263.5 m (865 ft)

Population (2002)
  - Total: 116

Šerovo (pronounced [ʃɛˈɾɔːʋɔ] or [ʃɛˈɾoːʋɔ]) is a settlement in the Municipality of Šmarje pri Jelšah in eastern Slovenia. The area was part of the historical region of Styria. With the division of Slovenia into Statistical regions in 2007, the municipality was included in the Savinja Statistical Region.
