= Zgornje Tinsko =

- Location in Slovenia
- Coordinates: 46°10′15.99″N 15°32′22.3″E
- Country: Slovenia
- Traditional region: Styria
- Statistical region: Savinja
- Municipality: Šmarje pri Jelšah

Area
  - Total: 3.01 km^{2} (1.16 sq mi)
- Elevation: 241 m (791 ft)

Population (2002)
  - Total: 140

Zgornje Tinsko (pronounced [ˈzɡoːɾnjɛ ˈtiːnskɔ]) is a settlement in the Municipality of Šmarje pri Jelšah in eastern Slovenia. It lies in the Kozje region (Slovene: Kozjansko) in the hills south of Šmarje. The area is part of the traditional region of Styria. The municipality is now included in the Savinja Statistical Region.
