= Laše =

- Location in Slovenia
- Coordinates: 46°14′6.38″N 15°34′17.06″E
- Country: Slovenia
- Traditional region: Styria
- Statistical region: Savinja
- Municipality: Šmarje pri Jelšah

Area
  - Total: 1.11 km^{2} (0.43 sq mi)
- Elevation: 264.1 m (866 ft)

Population (2002)
  - Total: 107

Laše (pronounced [ˈlaːʃɛ]) is a settlement in the Municipality of Šmarje pri Jelšah in eastern Slovenia. It lies in the hills south of the regional road from Šmarje to Rogaška Slatina. The area is part of the traditional Styria region and is now included in the Savinja Statistical Region.
