= Preloge pri Šmarju =

- Location in Slovenia
- Coordinates: 46°14′19.14″N 15°32′43.36″E
- Country: Slovenia
- Traditional region: Styria
- Statistical region: Savinja
- Municipality: Šmarje pri Jelšah

Area
  - Total: 0.72 km^{2} (0.28 sq mi)
- Elevation: 273.9 m (899 ft)

Population (2002)
  - Total: 107

Preloge pri Šmarju (pronounced [ˈpɾeːlɔɡɛ pɾi ˈʃmaːɾju]) is a small settlement near Šmarje pri Jelšah in eastern Slovenia. The area is part of the historical Styria region and the entire Municipality of Šmarje pri Jelšah is now included in the Savinja Statistical Region.

== Name ==
The name of the settlement was changed from Preloge to Preloge pri Šmarju in 1953.
