= Kristan Vrh =

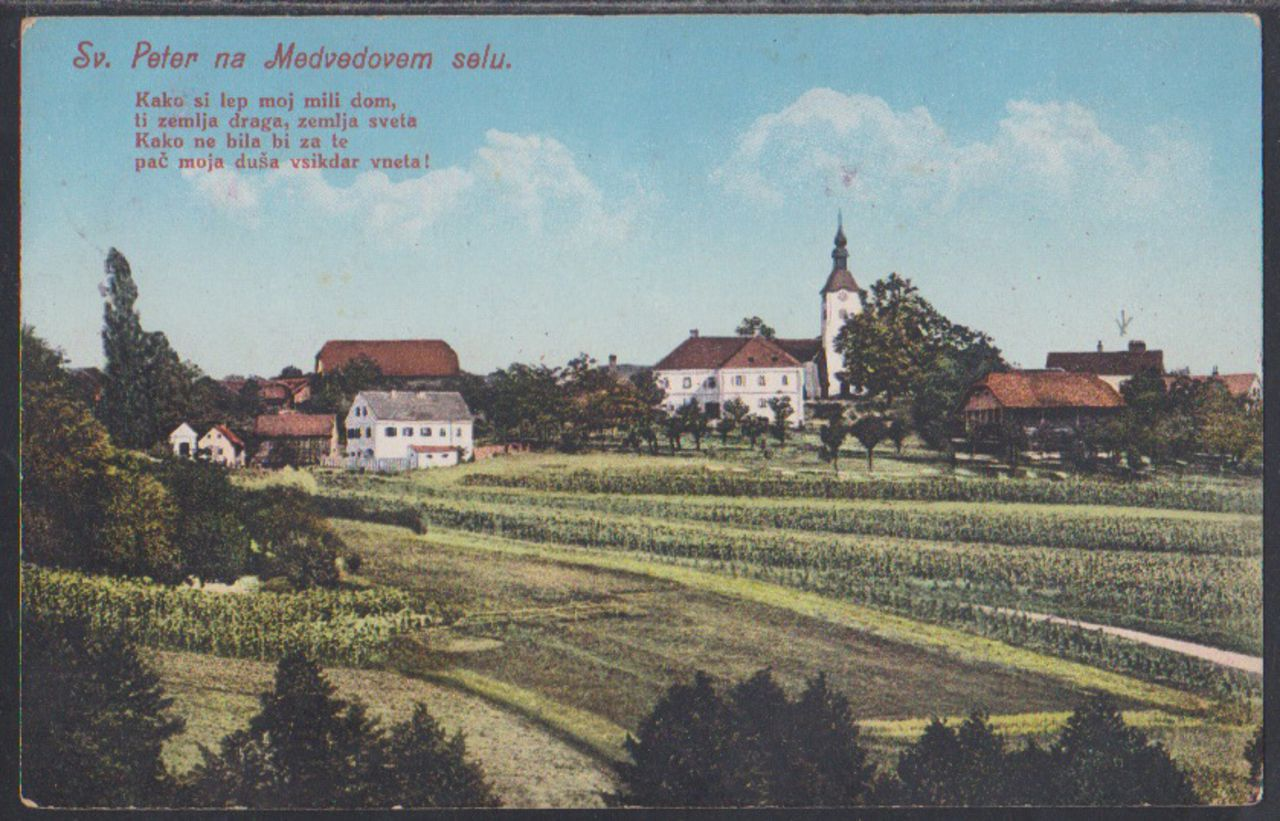
- 1919 postcard of Kristan Vrh

- Location in Slovenia
- Coordinates: 46°13′23.65″N 15°35′15.41″E
- Country: Slovenia
- Traditional region: Styria
- Statistical region: Savinja
- Municipality: Šmarje pri Jelšah

Area
  - Total: 2.81 km^{2} (1.08 sq mi)
- Elevation: 261.8 m (859 ft)

Population (2002)
  - Total: 395

Kristan Vrh (pronounced [ˈkɾiːstaɱ ˈʋəɾx]) is a settlement in the Municipality of Šmarje pri Jelšah in eastern Slovenia. It lies in the hills between Rogaška Slatina and Podčetrtek. The area is part of the traditional region of Styria. The municipality is now included in the Savinja Statistical Region.

The local parish church, built on a slight hill in the centre of the village, is dedicated to Saint Peter and belongs to the Roman Catholic Diocese of Celje. The church was first mentioned in written documents dating to 1545 and was rebuilt in the 18th century.
