= Municipality of Šmarje pri Jelšah =

Municipality of Slovenia

Municipality of Šmarje pri Jelšah Občina Šmarje pri Jelšah
- Municipality
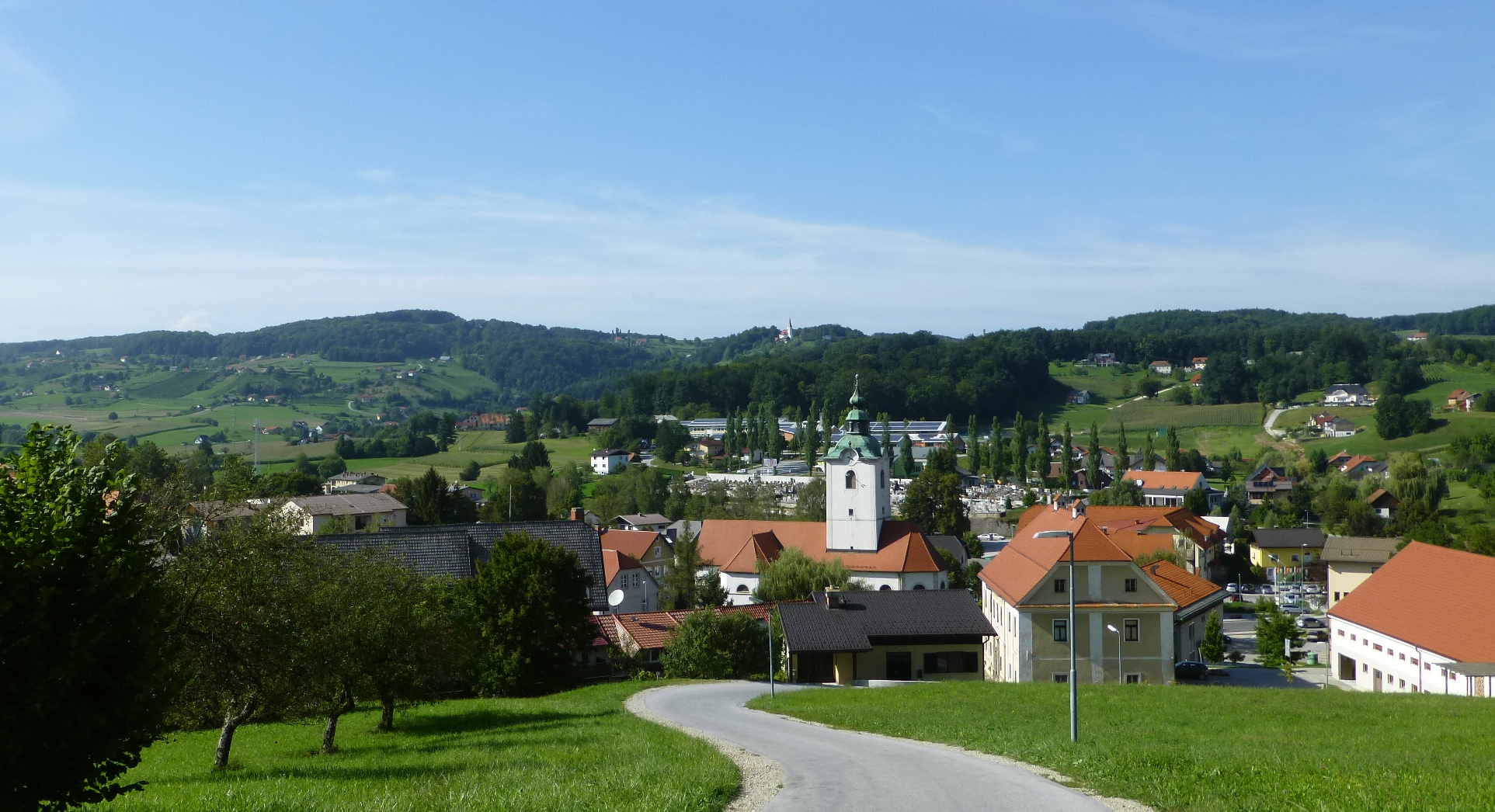

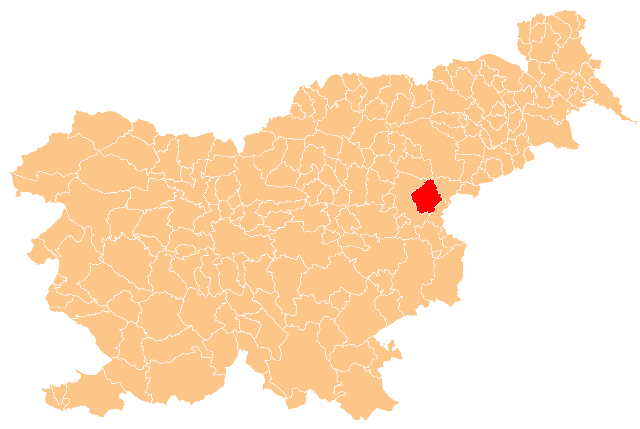
- Location of the Municipality of Šmarje pri Jelšah in Slovenia
- Coordinates: 46°19′N 15°40′E
- Country: Slovenia

Government
  - Mayor: Matija Čakš

Area
  - Total: 107.7 km^{2} (41.6 sq mi)

Population (2016)
  - Total: 10,259
  - Density: 95.26/km^{2} (246.7/sq mi)
- Time zone: UTC+01 (CET)
  - Summer (DST): UTC+02 (CEST)
- Website: smarje.si

The Municipality of Šmarje pri Jelšah (pronounced [ˈʃmaːɾjɛ pɾi ˈjeːlʃax]; Slovene: Občina Šmarje pri Jelšah) is a municipality in the traditional region of Styria in northeastern Slovenia. The seat of the municipality is the town of Šmarje pri Jelšah. Šmarje pri Jelšah became a municipality in 1994.

== Settlements ==
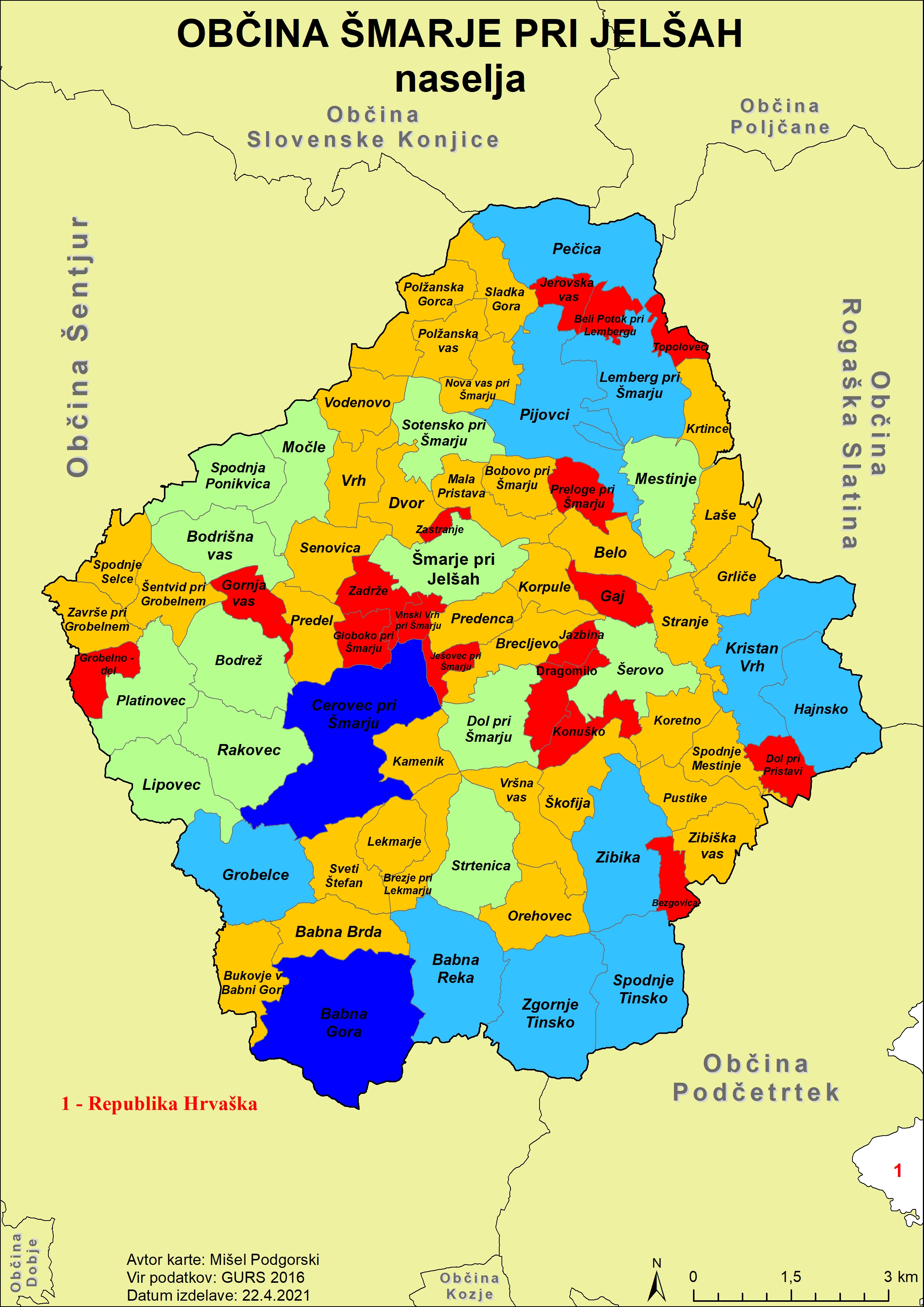
Villages in the municipality

In addition to the municipal seat of Šmarje pri Jelšah, the municipality also includes the following settlements:

- Babna Brda
- Babna Gora
- Babna Reka
- Beli Potok pri Lembergu
- Belo
- Bezgovica
- Bobovo pri Šmarju
- Bodrež
- Bodrišna Vas
- Brecljevo
- Brezje pri Lekmarju
- Bukovje v Babni Gori
- Cerovec pri Šmarju
- Dol pri Pristavi
- Dol pri Šmarju
- Dragomilo
- Dvor
- Gaj
- Globoko pri Šmarju
- Gornja Vas
- Grliče
- Grobelce
- Grobelno (Šmarje portion)*
- Hajnsko
- Jazbina
- Jerovska Vas
- Ješovec pri Šmarju
- Kamenik
- Konuško
- Koretno
- Korpule
- Kristan Vrh
- Krtince
- Laše
- Lekmarje
- Lemberg pri Šmarju
- Lipovec
- Mala Pristava
- Mestinje
- Močle
- Nova Vas pri Šmarju
- Orehovec
- Pečica
- Pijovci
- Platinovec
- Polžanska Gorca
- Polžanska Vas
- Predel
- Predenca
- Preloge pri Šmarju
- Pustike
- Rakovec
- Senovica
- Šentvid pri Grobelnem
- Šerovo
- Škofija
- Sladka Gora
- Sotensko pri Šmarju
- Spodnja Ponkvica
- Spodnje Mestinje
- Spodnje Selce
- Spodnje Tinsko
- Stranje
- Strtenica
- Sveti Štefan
- Topolovec
- Vinski Vrh pri Šmarju
- Vodenovo
- Vrh
- Vršna Vas
- Zadrže
- Zastranje
- Završe pri Grobelnem
- Zgornje Tinsko
- Zibika
- Zibiška Vas

*Because the settlement of Grobelno straddles two municipalities, it appears on this list as well as the Municipality of Šentjur list
