= Mala Pristava, Šmarje pri Jelšah =

Mala Pristava
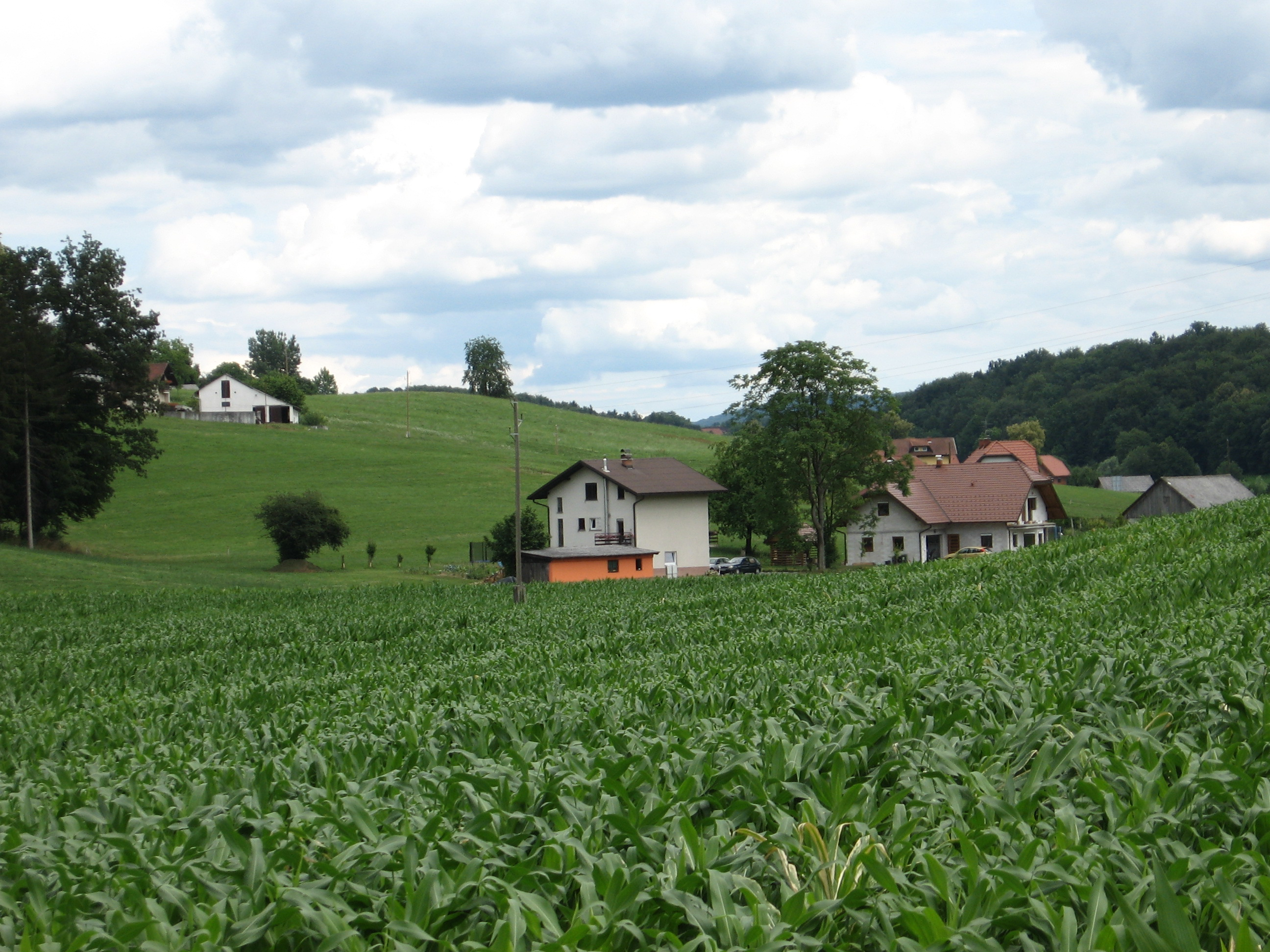

- Location in Slovenia
- Coordinates: 46°14′13.66″N 15°31′29.56″E
- Country: Slovenia
- Traditional region: Styria
- Statistical region: Savinja
- Municipality: Šmarje pri Jelšah

Area
  - Total: 1.12 km^{2} (0.43 sq mi)
- Elevation: 271.4 m (890 ft)

Population (2002)
  - Total: 83

Mala Pristava (pronounced [ˈmaːla ˈpɾiːstaʋa]) is a settlement in the Municipality of Šmarje pri Jelšah in eastern Slovenia. It lies in the hills just north of Šmarje. The area is part of the historical Styria region. The municipality is now included in the Savinja Statistical Region.

Remains of four to six Roman buildings have been identified in the hamlet of Grobeljšek in the settlement. One was excavated in the early 20th century.
