= Kamenik, Šmarje pri Jelšah =

Kamenik
- Location in Slovenia
- Coordinates: 46°12′9.53″N 15°30′33.79″E
- Country: Slovenia
- Traditional region: Styria
- Statistical region: Savinja
- Municipality: Šmarje pri Jelšah

Area
  - Total: 0.99 km^{2} (0.38 sq mi)
- Elevation: 336.2 m (1,103 ft)

Population (2002)
  - Total: 46

Kamenik (pronounced [ˈkaːmɛnik]) is a small dispersed settlement in the hills south of Šmarje pri Jelšah in eastern Slovenia. The area is part of the traditional region of Styria and is included in the Savinja Statistical Region.
