= Bodrež, Šmarje pri Jelšah =

Bodrež
- Location in Slovenia
- Coordinates: 46°13′5.09″N 15°28′40.92″E
- Country: Slovenia
- Traditional region: Styria
- Statistical region: Savinja
- Municipality: Šmarje pri Jelšah

Area
  - Total: 2.03 km^{2} (0.78 sq mi)
- Elevation: 357.5 m (1,173 ft)

Population (2002)
  - Total: 167

Bodrež (pronounced [ˈboːdɾɛʃ]) is a settlement in the Municipality of Šmarje pri Jelšah in eastern Slovenia. It lies in the hills south of Šentvid pri Grobelnem. The area is part of the historical region of Styria. In 2007 it was included in the Savinja Statistical Region of Slovenia.
