= Lemberg pri Šmarju =

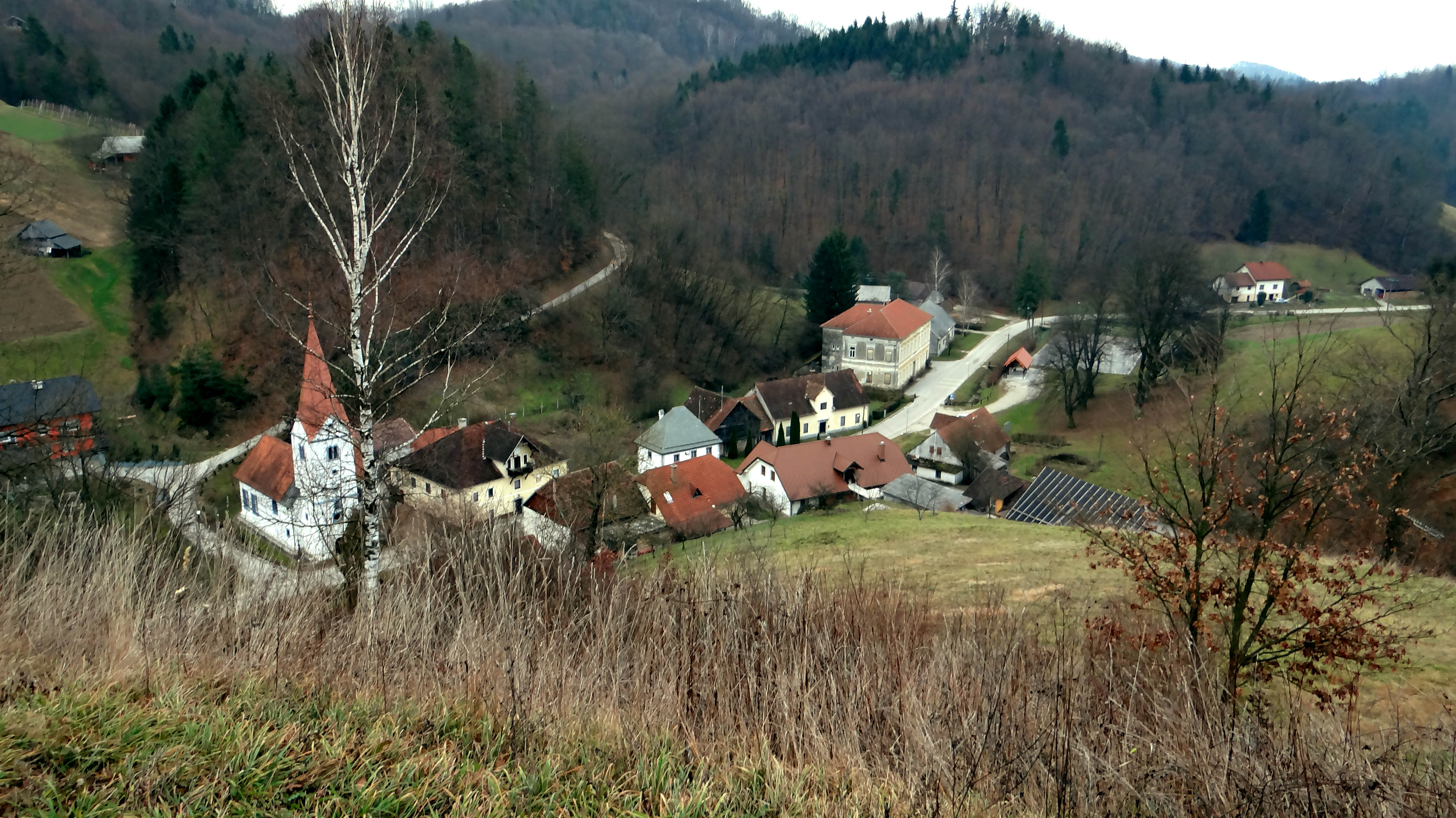

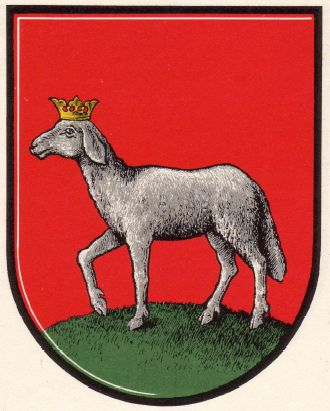
- Coat of arms

- Location in Slovenia
- Coordinates: 46°15′24.75″N 15°33′12.97″E
- Country: Slovenia
- Traditional region: Styria
- Statistical region: Savinja
- Municipality: Šmarje pri Jelšah

Area
  - Total: 2.36 km^{2} (0.91 sq mi)
- Elevation: 238.4 m (782 ft)

Population (2002)
  - Total: 136

Lemberg pri Šmarju (pronounced [ˈleːmbɛɾk pɾi ˈʃmaːɾju]) is a settlement in the Municipality of Šmarje pri Jelšah in eastern Slovenia. It lies in the hills northeast of Šmarje. The area is part of the traditional region of Styria. The municipality is now included in the Savinja Statistical Region.

== Name ==
The name of the settlement was changed from Lemberg to Lemberg pri Šmarju in 1953, distinguishing it from other places named Lemberg.

== Cultural heritage ==
Lemberg was the site of a medieval castle. Very few ruins of the castle remain visible today. It was first mentioned in written documents dating to 1224. It was owned by the Lords of Sannegg and was abandoned in the 15th century. What does remain is the castle chapel, now the church dedicated to Saint Pancras. It was extended and rebuilt in the 16th and 18th centuries. A second church in the settlement is dedicated to Saint Nicholas. It was a 15th-century building restyled in the Baroque in the 18th century. Both churches belong to the Parish of Sladka Gora.
