= Grliče =

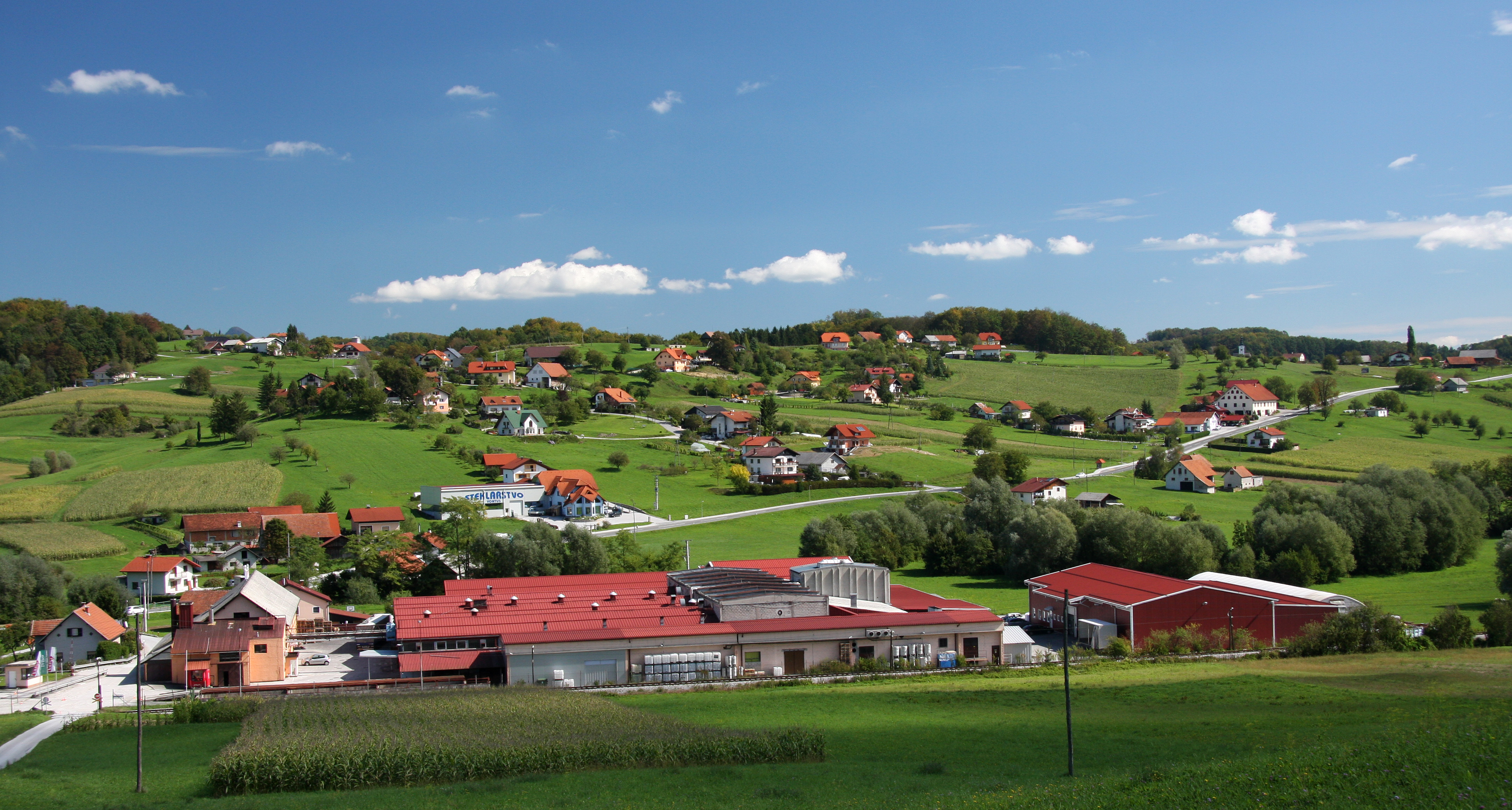

- Location in Slovenia
- Coordinates: 46°13′37.58″N 15°34′11.62″E
- Country: Slovenia
- Traditional region: Styria
- Statistical region: Savinja
- Municipality: Šmarje pri Jelšah

Area
  - Total: 1.09 km^{2} (0.42 sq mi)
- Elevation: 250.7 m (823 ft)

Population (2002)
  - Total: 203

Grliče (pronounced [ˈɡəɾlitʃɛ]) is a settlement in the Municipality of Šmarje pri Jelšah in eastern Slovenia. The municipality is part of the traditional region of Styria and is now included in the Savinja Statistical Region.
