= Zastranje =

- Location in Slovenia
- Coordinates: 46°14′12.15″N 15°31′5.27″E
- Country: Slovenia
- Traditional region: Styria
- Statistical region: Savinja
- Municipality: Šmarje pri Jelšah

Area
  - Total: 0.22 km^{2} (0.085 sq mi)
- Elevation: 277.1 m (909 ft)

Population (2002)
  - Total: 27

Zastranje (pronounced [zaˈstɾaːnjɛ]) is a small settlement just north of Šmarje pri Jelšah in eastern Slovenia. The area is part of the traditional region of Styria. The Municipality of Šmarje pri Jelšah is now included in the Savinja Statistical Region.

Remains of a Roman Villa rustica have been identified in the Grobelce part of settlement.
