= Spodnje Mestinje =

- Location in Slovenia
- Coordinates: 46°12′8.14″N 15°34′19.09″E
- Country: Slovenia
- Traditional region: Styria
- Statistical region: Savinja
- Municipality: Šmarje pri Jelšah

Area
  - Total: 0.89 km^{2} (0.34 sq mi)
- Elevation: 206.5 m (677 ft)

Population (2002)
  - Total: 51

Spodnje Mestinje (pronounced [ˈspoːdnjɛ mɛˈstiːnjɛ]) is a settlement in the Municipality of Šmarje pri Jelšah in eastern Slovenia. It lies just west of the regional road from Šmarje to Podčetrtek. The area is part of the historical Styria region. The entire municipality is now included in the Savinja Statistical Region.
