= Globoko pri Šmarju =

- Location in Slovenia
- Coordinates: 46°13′15.77″N 15°29′58.47″E
- Country: Slovenia
- Traditional region: Styria
- Statistical region: Savinja
- Municipality: Šmarje pri Jelšah

Area
  - Total: 0.62 km^{2} (0.24 sq mi)
- Elevation: 335.4 m (1,100 ft)

Population (2002)
  - Total: 68

Globoko pri Šmarju (pronounced [ɡlɔˈbɔːkɔ pɾi ˈʃmaːɾju]) is a settlement in the Municipality of Šmarje pri Jelšah in eastern Slovenia. It lies in the hills southwest of Šmarje. The municipality is included in the Savinja Statistical Region and is part of the traditional region of Styria.

== Name ==
The name of the settlement was changed from Globoko to Globoko pri Šmarju in 1953.
