= Polžanska Vas =

Place in Styria, Slovenia

- Location in Slovenia
- Coordinates: 46°15′38.01″N 15°31′0.01″E
- Country: Slovenia
- Traditional region: Styria
- Statistical region: Savinja
- Municipality: Šmarje pri Jelšah

Area
  - Total: 1.01 km^{2} (0.39 sq mi)
- Elevation: 251.9 m (826 ft)

Population (2002)
  - Total: 78

Polžanska Vas (pronounced [pɔu̯ˈʒaːnska ˈʋaːs]; Slovene: Polžanska vas) is a small village southwest of Sladka Gora in the Municipality of Šmarje pri Jelšah in eastern Slovenia. The area belongs to the traditional region of Styria. Since 2007 the municipality has been included in the Savinja Statistical Region.
