= Pijovci =

- Location in Slovenia
- Coordinates: 46°14′54.65″N 15°32′1.7″E
- Country: Slovenia
- Traditional region: Styria
- Statistical region: Savinja
- Municipality: Šmarje pri Jelšah

Area
  - Total: 3.21 km^{2} (1.24 sq mi)
- Elevation: 356.9 m (1,171 ft)

Population (2002)
  - Total: 169

Pijovci (pronounced [ˈpiːjɔu̯tsi]) is a dispersed settlement in the hills north of Šmarje pri Jelšah in eastern Slovenia. The Municipality of Šmarje pri Jelšah lies in the historical Styria region and is included in the Savinja Statistical Region.
