= Vrh, Šmarje pri Jelšah =

Vrh
- Location in Slovenia
- Coordinates: 46°14′36.45″N 15°29′51.27″E
- Country: Slovenia
- Traditional region: Styria
- Statistical region: Savinja
- Municipality: Šmarje pri Jelšah

Area
  - Total: 1 km^{2} (0.39 sq mi)
- Elevation: 363.5 m (1,193 ft)

Population (2002)
  - Total: 142

Vrh (pronounced [ˈʋəɾx]) is a settlement in the hills northwest of Šmarje pri Jelšah in eastern Slovenia. The entire Municipality of Šmarje pri Jelšah lies in the traditional region of Styria and is now included in the Savinja Statistical Region.
