= Ješovec pri Šmarju =

- Location in Slovenia
- Coordinates: 46°12′54.16″N 15°30′50.54″E
- Country: Slovenia
- Traditional region: Styria
- Statistical region: Savinja
- Municipality: Šmarje pri Jelšah

Area
  - Total: 0.4 km^{2} (0.15 sq mi)
- Elevation: 357 m (1,171 ft)

Population (2002)
  - Total: 54

Ješovec pri Šmarju (pronounced [jɛˈʃɔːʋəts pɾi ˈʃmaːɾju] or [jɛˈʃoːʋəts pɾi ˈʃmaːɾju]) is a small settlement in the Municipality of Šmarje pri Jelšah in eastern Slovenia. It is a roadside settlement on the road leading into the hills to the south of Šmarje. The area is part of the traditional region of Styria and is now included in the Savinja Statistical Region.

== Name ==
The name of the settlement was changed from Ješovec to Ješovec pri Šmarju in 1953.
