= Močle =

Močle Sveti Lovrenc pri Šmarju (until 1955)
- Location in Slovenia
- Coordinates: 46°14′29.48″N 15°29′14.8″E
- Country: Slovenia
- Traditional region: Styria
- Statistical region: Savinja
- Municipality: Šmarje pri Jelšah

Area
  - Total: 1.64 km^{2} (0.63 sq mi)
- Elevation: 343.4 m (1,127 ft)

Population (2002)
  - Total: 79

Močle (pronounced [ˈmoːtʃlɛ]) is a village in the Municipality of Šmarje pri Jelšah in eastern Slovenia. It lies in the hills west of Šmarje. The area is part of the historical Styria region. The municipality is now included in the Savinja Statistical Region. It is a clustered village on the south side of a gentle slope. It includes the hamlets of Erpoge and Sveti Lovrenc.

== Name ==
The name of the settlement was changed from Sveti Lovrenc pri Šmarju (literally, 'Saint Lawrence near Šmarje') to Močle in 1955. The name was changed on the basis of the 1948 Law on Names of Settlements and Designations of Squares, Streets, and Buildings as part of efforts by Slovenia's postwar communist government to remove religious elements from toponyms. The name Močle and names like it (e.g., Močile, Močilno) are derived from the Slovene common noun močilo, močila 'pond, swamp, wet area'. Before Močle became the name of the entire settlement, the name used to refer to one of the hamlets in the settlement.

== Church ==
The local church is dedicated to Saint Lawrence and belongs to the Parish of Šmarje pri Jelšah. It dates to the late 16th century with a sacristy added in the 18th century. The entire church was remodeled in 1939 and in 1959.

There is also a vaulted wayside shrine in Močle. It is believed to date from the 18th century.
