= Bobovo pri Šmarju =

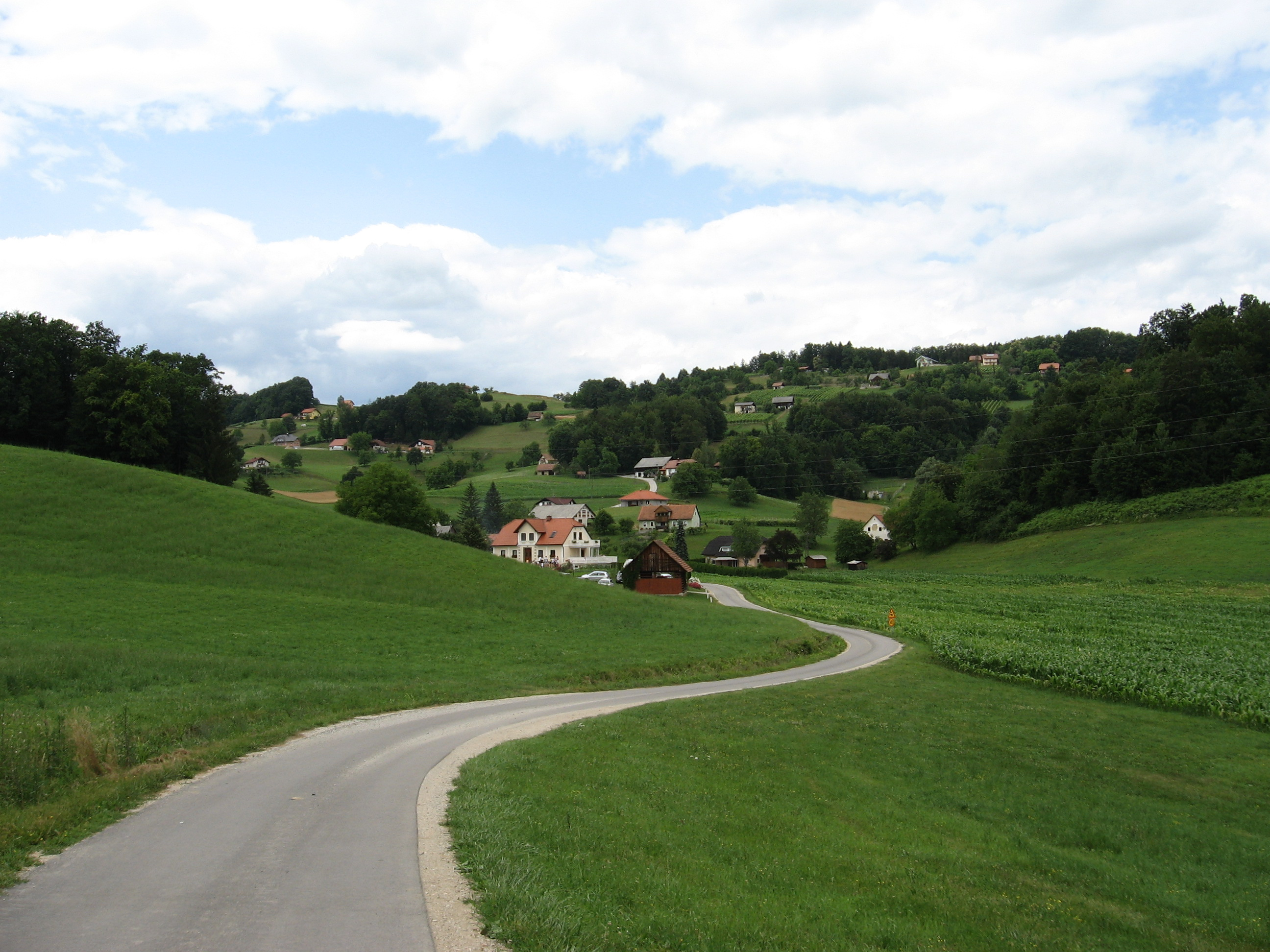

- Location in Slovenia
- Coordinates: 46°14′25.83″N 15°31′59.08″E
- Country: Slovenia
- Traditional region: Styria
- Statistical region: Savinja
- Municipality: Šmarje pri Jelšah

Area
  - Total: 0.87 km^{2} (0.34 sq mi)
- Elevation: 271.2 m (890 ft)

Population (2002)
  - Total: 99

Bobovo pri Šmarju (pronounced [bɔˈbɔːʋɔ pɾi ˈʃmaːɾju] or [bɔˈboːʋɔ pɾi ˈʃmaːɾju]) is a settlement in the hills northeast of Šmarje pri Jelšah in eastern Slovenia. The area is part of the traditional region of Styria. The Municipality of Šmarje pri Jelšah is now included in the Savinja Statistical Region.

== Name ==
The name of the settlement was changed from Bobovo to Bobovo pri Šmarju in 1953.
