= Pečica =

Pečica Sveti Mihael (until 1955)
- Location in Slovenia
- Coordinates: 46°16′18.85″N 15°32′3.92″E
- Country: Slovenia
- Traditional region: Styria
- Statistical region: Savinja
- Municipality: Šmarje pri Jelšah

Area
  - Total: 2.77 km^{2} (1.07 sq mi)
- Elevation: 470.1 m (1,542 ft)

Population (2002)
  - Total: 109

Pečica (pronounced [pɛˈtʃiːtsa]) is a settlement in the Municipality of Šmarje pri Jelšah in eastern Slovenia. It lies in the hills north of Sladka Gora. The area is part of the historical Styria region. The municipality is now included in the Savinja Statistical Region.

== Geography ==
Pečica includes the hamlet of Orehova Vas (Slovene: Orehova vas) southeast of the village church.

== Name ==
The name of the settlement was changed from Sveti Mihael (literally, 'Archangel Michael') to Pečica (literally, 'small cliff/cave') in 1955. The name was changed on the basis of the 1948 Law on Names of Settlements and Designations of Squares, Streets, and Buildings as part of efforts by Slovenia's postwar communist government to remove religious elements from toponyms. Before Pečica became the name of the entire settlement, the name used to refer to one of the hamlets in the settlement.

== Church ==
The local church is dedicated to Saint Michael and belongs to the Parish of Sladka Gora. It is a medieval building that was partially rebuilt and restyled in the Baroque.
