= Topolovec, Šmarje pri Jelšah =

Topolovec
- Location in Slovenia
- Coordinates: 46°15′35.33″N 15°33′35.96″E
- Country: Slovenia
- Traditional region: Styria
- Statistical region: Savinja
- Municipality: Šmarje pri Jelšah

Area
  - Total: 0.45 km^{2} (0.17 sq mi)
- Elevation: 312.9 m (1,027 ft)

Population (2002)
  - Total: 23

Topolovec (pronounced [tɔpɔˈlɔːʋəts] or [tɔpɔˈloːʋəts]) is a small settlement in the Municipality of Šmarje pri Jelšah in eastern Slovenia. It lies just west of the regional road leading north from Šmarje towards Poljčane. Historically it is part of the Styria region. The municipality is now included in the Savinja Statistical Region.
