= Pristava pri Mestinju =

- Location in Slovenia
- Coordinates: 46°11′46.01″N 15°35′43.29″E
- Country: Slovenia
- Traditional region: Styria
- Statistical region: Savinja
- Municipality: Podčetrtek

Area
  - Total: 1.62 km^{2} (0.63 sq mi)
- Elevation: 204.4 m (671 ft)

Population (2002)
  - Total: 194

Pristava pri Mestinju (pronounced [ˈpɾiːstaʋa pɾi mɛˈstiːnju]) is a settlement in the Municipality of Podčetrtek in eastern Slovenia. It lies on the main road from Podčetrtek to Rogaška Slatina. The area is part of the traditional region of Styria. It is now included in the Savinja Statistical Region.

== Name ==
The name of the settlement was changed from Pristava to Pristava pri Mestinju in 1953.
