= Sveti Štefan, Šmarje pri Jelšah =

Sveti Štefan Vinski Vrh pri Slivnici (1955–1994)
- Location in Slovenia
- Coordinates: 46°11′14.01″N 15°30′5.29″E
- Country: Slovenia
- Traditional region: Styria
- Statistical region: Savinja
- Municipality: Šmarje pri Jelšah

Area
  - Total: 1.22 km^{2} (0.47 sq mi)
- Elevation: 375 m (1,230 ft)

Population (2002)
  - Total: 126
- Postal code: 3264

Sveti Štefan (pronounced [ˈsʋeːti ˈʃteːfan]) is a small settlement in the Municipality of Šmarje pri Jelšah in eastern Slovenia. It lies in the hills south of Šmarje in the Kozje region (Slovene: Kozjansko). The area is part of the traditional region of Styria. The municipality is now included in the Savinja Statistical Region.

== Name ==
The name of the settlement was changed from Sveti Štefan (literally, 'Saint Stephen') to Vinski Vrh pri Slivnici (literally, 'Wine Peak near Slivnica') in 1955. The name was changed on the basis of the 1948 Law on Names of Settlements and Designations of Squares, Streets, and Buildings as part of efforts by Slovenia's postwar communist government to remove religious elements from toponyms. The name Sveti Štefan was restored in 1994.

== Church ==
The local parish church, from which the settlement gets its name, is dedicated to Saint Stephen and belongs to the Roman Catholic Diocese of Celje. It is a 15th-century church that was rebuilt in the 17th century.

== Notable people ==
Notable people that were born or lived in Sveti Štefan include:

- Saša Vegri (1934–2010), poet
