= Zibika =

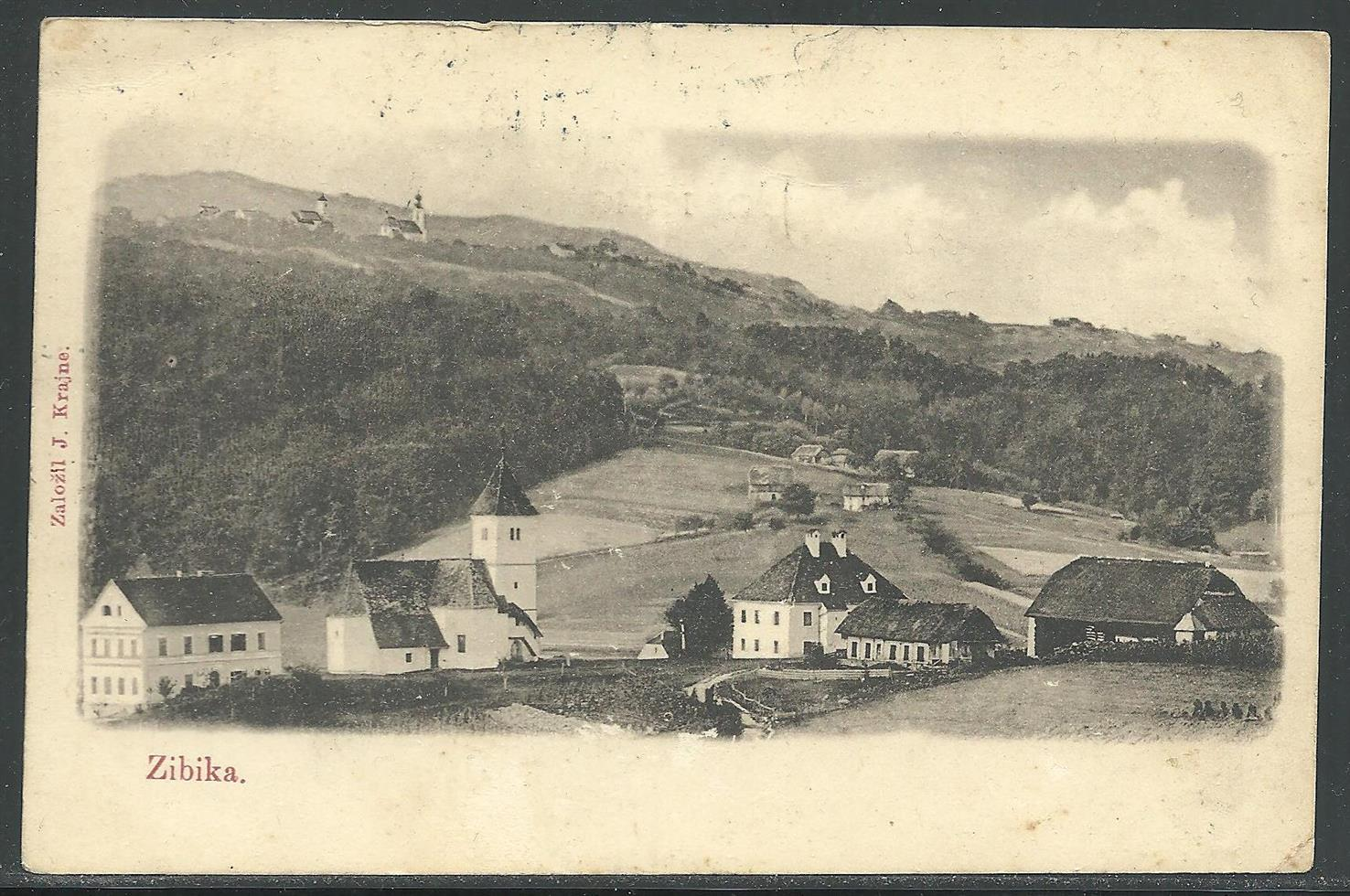
- 1910 postcard of Zibika

- Location in Slovenia
- Coordinates: 46°11′29.26″N 15°33′16.19″E
- Country: Slovenia
- Traditional region: Styria
- Statistical region: Savinja
- Municipality: Šmarje pri Jelšah

Area
  - Total: 2.6 km^{2} (1.0 sq mi)
- Elevation: 226.7 m (744 ft)

Population (2002)
  - Total: 180

Zibika (pronounced [ˈziːbika]) is a village in the Municipality of Šmarje pri Jelšah in eastern Slovenia. The area is part of the traditional region of Styria. The municipality is now included in the Savinja Statistical Region.

The local parish church is dedicated to Saint Bartholomew (Slovene: Sveti Jernej) and belongs to the Roman Catholic Diocese of Celje. It dates to the 14th century but was expanded and rebuilt over the centuries.
