= Šentvid pri Grobelnem =

- Location in Slovenia
- Coordinates: 46°13′33.19″N 15°27′40.96″E
- Country: Slovenia
- Traditional region: Styria
- Statistical region: Savinja
- Municipality: Šmarje pri Jelšah

Area
  - Total: 1.14 km^{2} (0.44 sq mi)
- Elevation: 283.1 m (929 ft)

Population (2002)
  - Total: 182

Šentvid pri Grobelnem (pronounced [ʃɛnˈtʋiːt pɾi ˈɡɾoːbəlnɛm] or [ʃənˈtʋiːt pɾi ˈɡɾoːbəlnɛm]) is a village in the Municipality of Šmarje pri Jelšah in eastern Slovenia. It lies on the regional road from Šmarje to Celje. The area is part of the traditional region of Styria. The municipality is now included in the Savinja Statistical Region.

== Name ==
The name of the settlement was changed from Šent Vid pri Grobelnem to Šentvid pri Grobelnem in 1955.

== Church ==
The local parish church from which the settlement gets its name is dedicated to Saint Vitus and belongs to the Roman Catholic Diocese of Celje. It is a medieval building that was rebuilt in the 17th century and extended and restyled in the 18th century.
