= Grobelno, Slovenia =

Grobelno
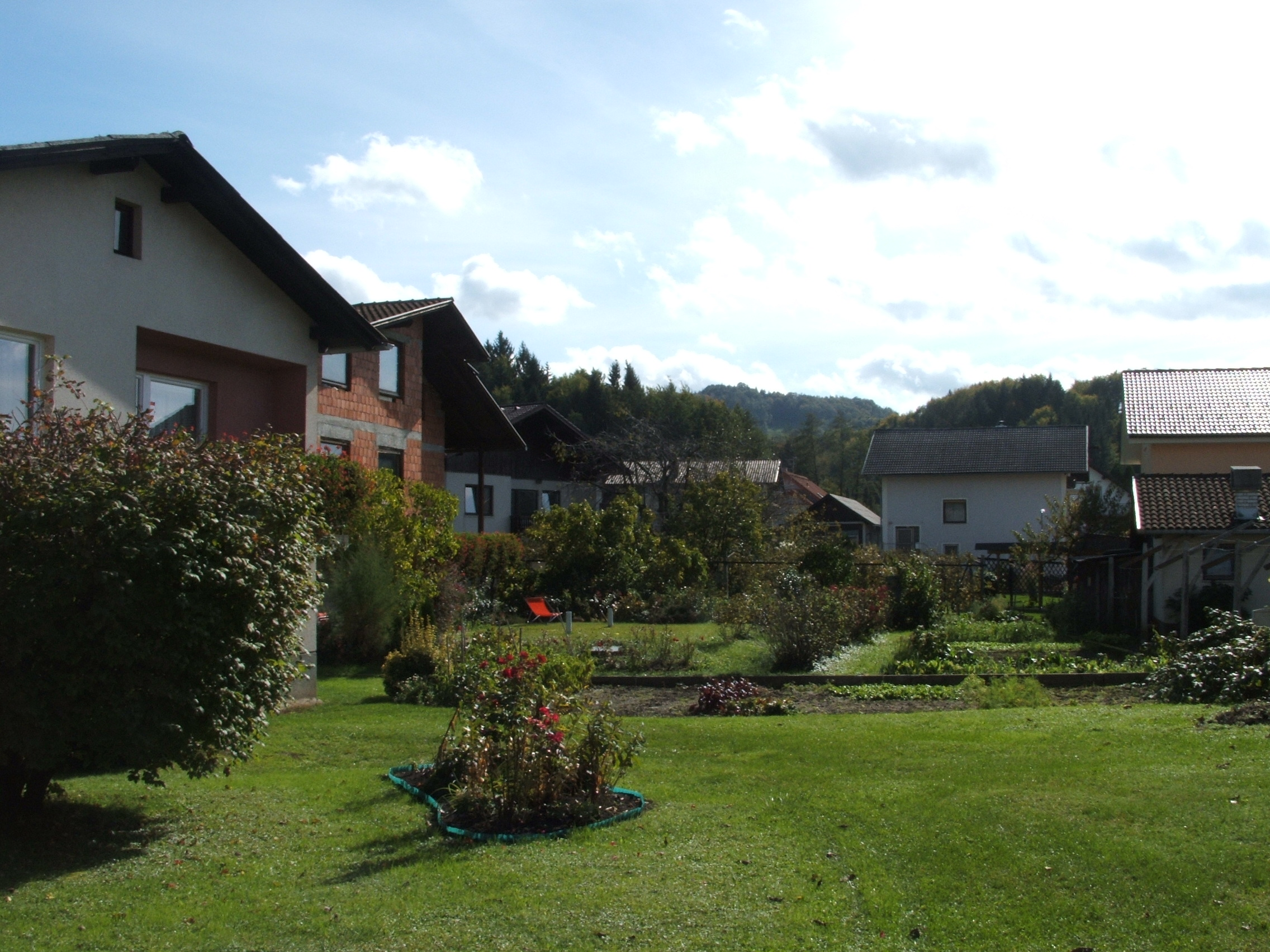

- Location in Slovenia
- Coordinates: 46°12′54.2″N 15°26′50.7″E
- Country: Slovenia
- Traditional region: Styria
- Statistical region: Savinja
- Municipality: straddles: Šmarje pri Jelšah; Šentjur

Area
  - Total: 2.96 km^{2} (1.14 sq mi)
- Elevation: 265 m (869 ft)

Population (2020)
  - Total: 507
  - Density: 171/km^{2} (444/sq mi)
- (Population split: Šmarje pri Jelšah - 295; Šentjur - 212)

Grobelno (pronounced [ˈˈɡɾoːbəlnɔ]) is a settlement in eastern Slovenia. Grobelno straddles the border between the Municipality of Šmarje pri Jelšah (to the south and east) and the Municipality of Šentjur (to the north and west). As of January 2020, 58% of the population of Grobelno lives in Šmarje pri Jelšah, with 42% in Šentjur. The entire settlement, and both municipalities, are included in the Savinja Statistical Region, which is in the Slovenian portion of the historical Duchy of Styria.

Railway lines run through the settlement, including a junction in the Šentjur section for transferring between a line from Celje and a line from Maribor.
