= Sladka Gora =

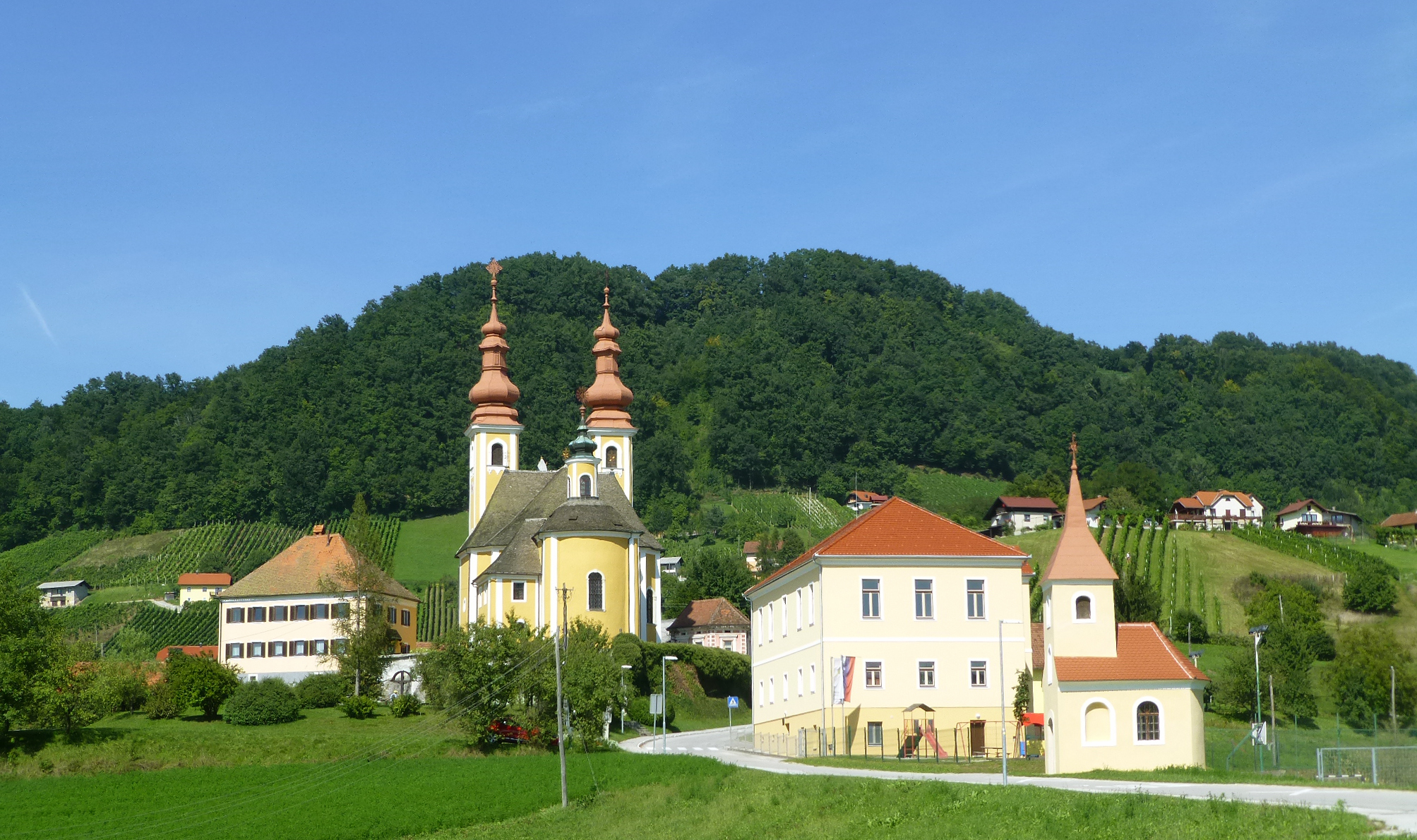

- Location in Slovenia
- Coordinates: 46°15′54.95″N 15°31′48.74″E
- Country: Slovenia
- Traditional region: Styria
- Statistical region: Savinja
- Municipality: Šmarje pri Jelšah

Area
  - Total: 1.22 km^{2} (0.47 sq mi)
- Elevation: 298.1 m (978 ft)

Population (2002)
  - Total: 85

Sladka Gora (pronounced [ˈslaːtka ˈɡɔːɾa]) is a settlement in the Municipality of Šmarje pri Jelšah in eastern Slovenia. It lies in the hills to the north of Šmarje. The area is part of the traditional region of Styria. The municipality is now included in the Savinja Statistical Region.

It is best known for its parish church, a pilgrimage church with a double spire dedicated to the Virgin Mary and Saint Margaret. It belongs to the Roman Catholic Diocese of Celje. It was built between 1744 and 1754.
