= Kozje =

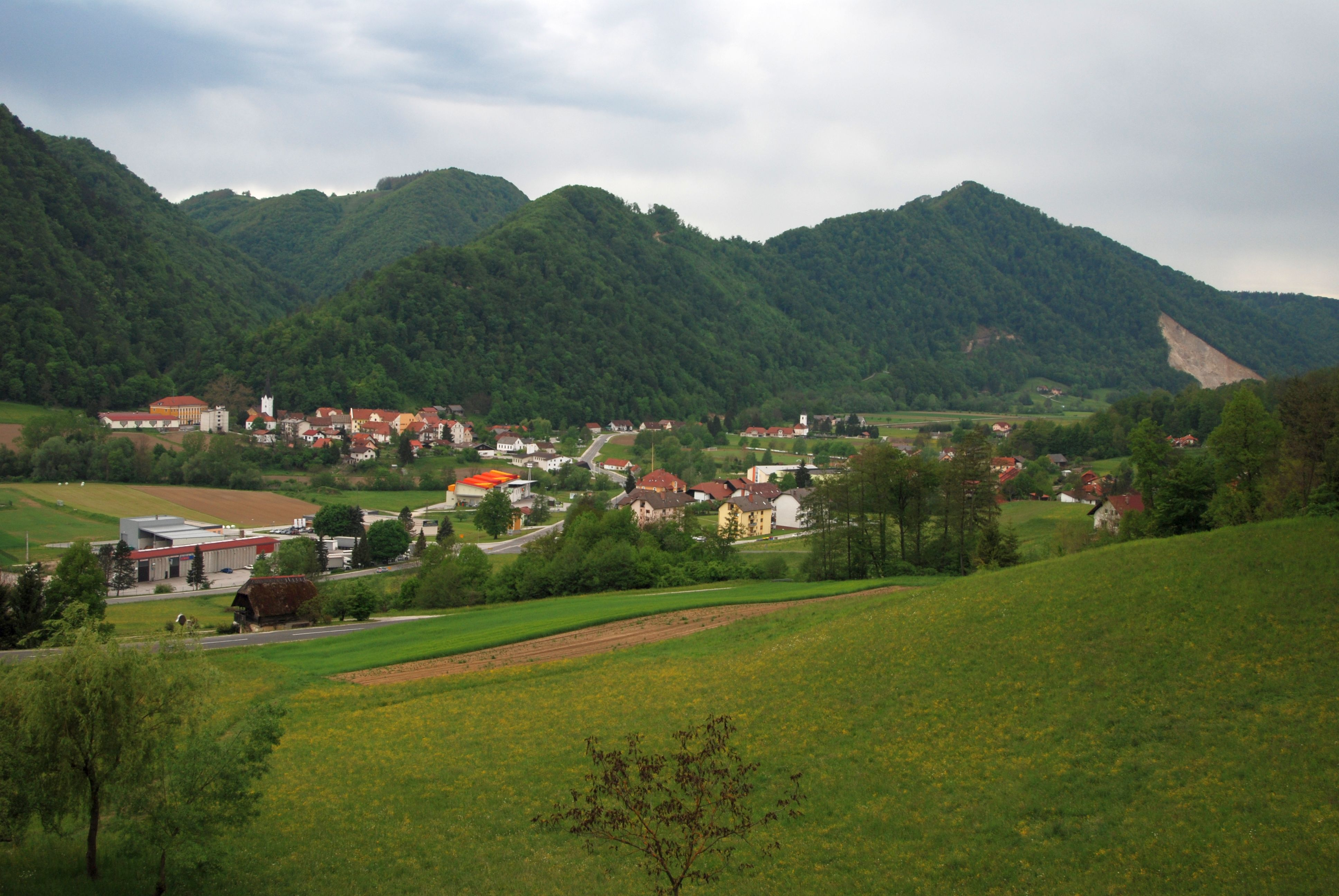

- Location in Slovenia
- Coordinates: 46°4′26.4″N 15°33′32.4″E
- Country: Slovenia
- Traditional region: Styria
- Statistical region: Savinja
- Municipality: Kozje

Area
  - Total: 5.98 km^{2} (2.31 sq mi)
- Elevation: 275.8 m (905 ft)

Population (2019)
  - Total: 634

Kozje (pronounced [ˈkoːzjɛ], German: Drachenburg) is a small town in eastern Slovenia. It is the seat of the Municipality of Kozje. The settlement of Kozje lies in the centre of the municipality, 36 km (22.37 mi) from Celje, 107 km (66.49 mi) from Ljubljana, and 30 km (18.64 mi) from Rogaška Slatina. It is the main settlement of the Kozje region (Slovene: Kozjansko). The area is part of the traditional region of Styria. The municipality is now included in the Savinja Statistical Region. It is one of the oldest settlements in the area, first mentioned in written documents dating to 1016. It was granted market rights before 1384.

The parish church in the settlement is dedicated to the Assumption of Mary and belongs to the Roman Catholic Diocese of Celje. It was built on the site of an earlier building in the 15th century and has major 17th-century alterations. A second church in the settlement is dedicated to Saint Hemma (Slovene: sveta Ema). It was built in around 1466 with 16th-century modifications and the nave extended in 1861.
