= List of faults in Slovenia =

This is a list of major fault lines and fault zones in Slovenia.

- Brežice Fault
- Donat Fault
- Hochstuhl Fault
- Idrija Fault
- Kneža Fault
- Labot Fault (Lavanttal Fault)
- Orlica Fault
- Periadriatic Seam
- Predjama Fault
- Raša Fault
- Ravne Fault
- Sava Fault
- Šoštanj Fault
- Stična Fault
- Vodice Fault
- Žužemberk Fault
