= Rečica ob Paki =

- Location in Slovenia
- Coordinates: 46°19′11.13″N 15°2′25.41″E
- Country: Slovenia
- Traditional region: Styria
- Statistical region: Savinja
- Municipality: Šmartno ob Paki

Area
  - Total: 0.69 km^{2} (0.27 sq mi)
- Elevation: 310.3 m (1,018 ft)

Population (2002)
  - Total: 393

Rečica ob Paki (pronounced [ɾɛˈtʃiːtsa ɔp ˈpaːki]) is a village in the Municipality of Šmartno ob Paki in northern Slovenia. It lies on both banks of the Paka River at its confluence with the Savinja south of Šmartno. The area is part of the traditional region of Styria. The municipality is now included in the Savinja Statistical Region.
