= Gorenje, Šmartno ob Paki =

Gorenje
- Location in Slovenia
- Coordinates: 46°20′44.12″N 15°0′33.7″E
- Country: Slovenia
- Traditional region: Styria
- Statistical region: Savinja
- Municipality: Šmartno ob Paki

Area
  - Total: 0.79 km^{2} (0.31 sq mi)
- Elevation: 325.9 m (1,069 ft)

Population (2002)
  - Total: 118

Gorenje (pronounced [ɡɔˈɾɛːnjɛ] or [ɡɔˈɾeːnjɛ]) is a settlement in the Municipality of Šmartno ob Paki in northern Slovenia. It lies on the right bank of the Paka River northwest of Šmartno. The area is part of the traditional region of Styria. The municipality is now included in the Savinja Statistical Region.

The local church is dedicated to Saint John the Baptist and belongs to the Parish of Šmartno. It is a medieval church that was greatly rebuilt in the 18th century.

It is the source of the name of the Slovenian appliance manufacturer Gorenje, which was founded in 1950 by Ivan Atelšek.
