= Šentvid pri Zavodnju =

Šentvid pri Zavodnju Sveti Vid pri Zavodnju (until 1955)
- Location in Slovenia
- Coordinates: 46°26′2.5″N 14°58′30.56″E
- Country: Slovenia
- Traditional region: Styria
- Statistical region: Savinja
- Municipality: Šoštanj

Area
  - Total: 9.31 km^{2} (3.59 sq mi)
- Elevation: 987.6 m (3,240 ft)

Population (2002)
  - Total: 46

Šentvid pri Zavodnju (pronounced [sɛnˈtʋiːt pɾi ˈzaːʋɔdnju] or [sənˈtʋiːt pɾi ˈzaːʋɔdnju]) is a dispersed settlement in the Municipality of Šoštanj in northern Slovenia. It lies in the Mozirje Hills (Slovene: Mozirske planine) northwest of the town of Šoštanj. The area is part of the traditional region of Styria. The entire municipality is now included in the Savinja Statistical Region.

== Name ==
The name of the settlement was changed from Sveti Vid pri Zavodnju (literally, 'Saint Vitus near Zavodnje') to Šentvid pri Zavodnju in 1955. The name was changed on the basis of the 1948 Law on Names of Settlements and Designations of Squares, Streets, and Buildings as part of efforts by Slovenia's postwar communist government to remove religious elements from toponyms.

== History ==
On 22 February 1944 the Slovene poet and Yugoslav people's hero Karel Destovnik (a.k.a. Kajuh) was killed in fighting with German troops in the hamlet of Žlebnik south of the main settlement. A simple granite block marks the site.
