= Gavce =

- Location in Slovenia
- Coordinates: 46°20′21.8″N 15°1′20.93″E
- Country: Slovenia
- Traditional region: Styria
- Statistical region: Savinja
- Municipality: Šmartno ob Paki

Area
  - Total: 1.33 km^{2} (0.51 sq mi)
- Elevation: 348.2 m (1,142 ft)

Population (2002)
  - Total: 384

Gavce (pronounced [ˈɡaːu̯tsɛ], sometimes misspelled Gavče) is a settlement in the Municipality of Šmartno ob Paki in northern Slovenia. It lies on the left bank of the Paka River north of Šmartno. The area is part of the traditional region of Styria. The municipality is now included in the Savinja Statistical Region.

A small chapel-shrine in the settlement containing a statute of Saint Urban dates to the mid-19th century.
