= Lokovica, Šoštanj =

Lokovica
- Location in Slovenia
- Coordinates: 46°21′50.14″N 15°3′28.69″E
- Country: Slovenia
- Traditional region: Styria
- Statistical region: Savinja
- Municipality: Šoštanj

Area
  - Total: 8.06 km^{2} (3.11 sq mi)
- Elevation: 388 m (1,273 ft)

Population (2002)
  - Total: 850

Lokovica (pronounced [lɔkɔˈʋiːtsa], German: Lokovitzen) is a settlement in the Municipality of Šoštanj in northern Slovenia. It lies in the hills south of the town of Šoštanj. The area is part of the traditional region of Styria. The municipality is now included in the Savinja Statistical Region.
