= Kneža Fault =

The Kneža Fault (pronounced [ˈkneːʒa]; Slovene: Kneški prelom) is a fault in Slovenia. It strikes NW-SE and lies southwest of the Ravne Fault and northwest of the Idrija Fault. Movements along the fault can be constrained to dextral strike-slip. The orientation and kinematics are similar to the Ravne Fault, Žužemberk Fault, Predjama Fault, and Raša Fault.

The fault is named after the village of Kneža. It roughly extends between Bovec in the northwest and Idrija in the southeast.
