= Slatina, Šmartno ob Paki =

Slatina
- Location in Slovenia
- Coordinates: 46°19′49.05″N 15°1′11.09″E
- Country: Slovenia
- Traditional region: Styria
- Statistical region: Savinja
- Municipality: Šmartno ob Paki

Area
  - Total: 1.62 km^{2} (0.63 sq mi)
- Elevation: 371 m (1,217 ft)

Population (2002)
  - Total: 211

Slatina (pronounced [slaˈtiːna]) is a settlement in the Municipality of Šmartno ob Paki in northern Slovenia. It lies on the right bank of the Paka River, opposite Šmartno. The area is part of the traditional region of Styria. The municipality is now included in the Savinja Statistical Region.

A small chapel-shrine in the settlement is dedicated to the Sacred Heart and dates to 1890.
