= Podgora, Šmartno ob Paki =

Podgora
- Location in Slovenia
- Coordinates: 46°18′44.24″N 15°2′59.51″E
- Country: Slovenia
- Traditional region: Styria
- Statistical region: Savinja
- Municipality: Šmartno ob Paki

Area
  - Total: 3.1 km^{2} (1.2 sq mi)
- Elevation: 307 m (1,007 ft)

Population (2002)
  - Total: 198

Podgora (pronounced [pɔdˈɡɔːɾa]) is a settlement in the Municipality of Šmartno ob Paki in northern Slovenia. It lies on the right bank of the Paka River at its confluence with the Savinja at the foot of Mount Oljka south of Šmartno. The area is part of the traditional region of Styria. The municipality is now included in the Savinja Statistical Region.
