= Šalek Valley =

Basin in northern Slovenia

Coordinates: 46°21′31″N 15°07′38″E

The Šalek Valley (pronounced [ˈʃaːlɛk]; Slovene: Šaleška dolina, German: Schallegger Tal) or the Velenje Basin (pronounced [ʋɛˈlɛːnjɛ]; Velenjska kotlina) is a basin in northern Slovenia in the northeastern pre-alpine foothills. It is named after Šalek Castle near the town of Velenje. The valley lies between the Kamnik–Savinja Alps to the west, the Pohorje Mountain Range to the east, and the Sava Hills to the south. It has a northwest-southeast orientation and is approximately 8 km long and 2 km wide. It contains a number of rivers and lakes. The Paka River runs through Velenje, with a number of tributaries from the northwest: Trebušnica Creek, Veriželj Creek and Slatina Creek. The Paka itself eventually flows into the Savinja River. The valley is separated from the Upper Savinja Valley (Zgornja Savinjska dolina) and Lower Savinja Valley (Spodnja Savinjska dolina) by the Golte Plateau, the Skorno Hills (Skornški hribi, peaks along the Paka including Mount Oljka, and the Ponikva Plateau (Ponikovska planota).

Especially on the north, the valley is closed in by a chain of high mountains, from northeast to northwest: Paka Mount Kozjak with its peaks Basališče (1272 m) and Špik (1108 m), Smodivnik (923 m), Stropnica (880 m), Vodemlja (780 m), Ljubela (779 m), Mount Graška (Graška gora, 825 m), the Krištan Pasture (Slovene: Krištanova planina) (654 m), Big Peak (Veliki vrh), and Stakne Peak (Staknetov vrh, 1258 m). The highest peaks rise beyond these: Mount St. Ursula (Uršlja gora, 1,699 m; also named Plešivec), and Smrekovec (1,577 m). The northern border of the valley meets the Karawanks mountain range, and this northern area of the valley therefore has the fewest road connections.

The southern part of the valley is less mountainous, and is surrounded by lower mountains and hills such as Wine Mountain (Vinska gora) to the northeast. The southern edge along the Ložnica Hills arose along the geologically important Šoštanj Fault, allowing the valley road access towards the east. The town of Velenje is also located at the end of this eastern opening.

Because of mining in the vicinity of Velenje, subsidence results in water flooding the resulting basins and creating lakes. The largest lake is Lake Velenje (Velenjsko jezero) and nearby Lake Družmirje (Družmirsko jezero) and Lake Škale (Škalsko jezero), approaching the Paka to the south at the western end of the valley, where the town of Šoštanj is located.

The Šalek Valley formed in the late Cenozoic era, during the Pliocene epoch of the Neogene period. Faults started to appear at this time due to epeirogenic movement, vertically lifting and lowering the surface. Ridges formed and the ground sank, and lignite deposits started to form between the sand and loam. These brown coal deposits represent the great majority of the mineral wealth of this area. Besides the Ljubljana Marsh, the Šalek Valley is one of the tectonically youngest basins in Slovenia.
