= Ravne, Šoštanj =

Ravne
- Location in Slovenia
- Coordinates: 46°24′1.31″N 15°3′44.75″E
- Country: Slovenia
- Traditional region: Styria
- Statistical region: Savinja
- Municipality: Šoštanj

Area
  - Total: 14.04 km^{2} (5.42 sq mi)
- Elevation: 391.6 m (1,285 ft)

Population (2002)
  - Total: 1,062

Ravne (pronounced [ˈɾáːwnɛ]; German: Raune) is a settlement in the Municipality of Šoštanj in northern Slovenia. It lies in the Mozirje Hills (Slovene: Mozirske planine) north of the town of Šoštanj. The area is part of the traditional region of Styria. The entire municipality is now included in the Savinja Statistical Region.

The local church is dedicated to the Holy Spirit and belongs to the Parish of Šoštanj. It dates to the second half of the 16th century. The ruins of Forhtenek Castle, a 14th-century castle destroyed in a peasants' revolt in 1635, are still visible on a hill above the settlement.
