= Karel Destovnik =

Slovene poet

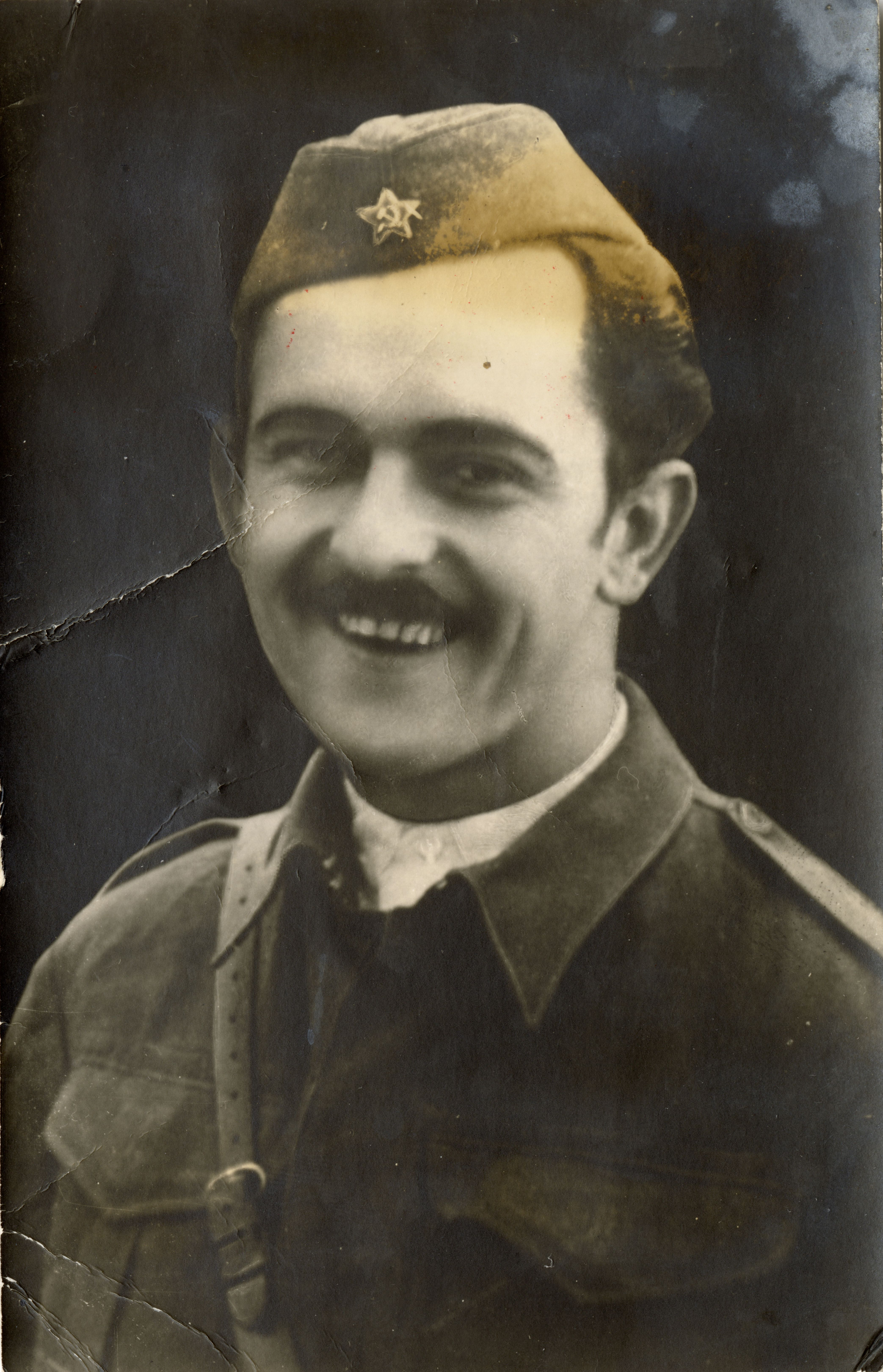
Karel Destovnik

Karel Destovnik (sometimes Drago Destovnik), pen name and nom de guerre Kajuh (Slovene convention: Karel Destovnik – Kajuh, 13 December 1922 – 22 February 1944), was a Slovenian poet, translator, resistance fighter, and Yugoslav people's hero.

== Life and work ==
Kajuh was born in the town of Šoštanj in Slovenian Styria as the illegitimate child of Jože Destovnik and Marija Vasle. His parents later married on 14 August 1923. The sobriquet Kajuh – associated with the word kanjuh referring to buzzard – comes from the estate name of his grandfather's birthplace in Skorno near Šmartno ob Paki.

After finishing primary school in 1933, he enrolled in the Celje First Grammar School. In 1934 he became a member of the Young Communist League of Yugoslavia (SKOJ). On 29 April 1940, he was expelled from school due to his communist ideas. He then continued his schooling in Maribor but did not finish it due to World War II.

Kajuh started writing poems before World War II. He began publishing his poems in the literary magazine for youth Slovenska mladina (Slovene Youth), edited by his friend Dušan Pirjevec. Some of his best poems from this period with social, political, and love themes were published in this journal: "Otrok slovenski" (Slovene Child), "Slutnja" (Premonition), "Norec" (Madman), "Pesem delavca o svoji ljubici" (A Worker's Poem on His Beloved), "Vseh mrtvih dan" (Day of All the Dead), "Otrokovo pismo Jezuščku" (A Child's Letter to Jesus), "Novoletni sonet" (A New Year's Sonnet), "Kmečki otrok vprašuje" (The Question of the Peasant's Child), "Moj stric" (My Uncle), and so on. Kajuh was also a prolific translator. Especially noteworthy are his translations from Czech, particularly of the authors Jiří Wolker, František Halas, Ivan Olbracht, and Jaroslav Seifert.

He was arrested by the Yugoslav authorities at the end of January 1941 and sent to a prison camp in Ivanjica, Serbia, where he remained until mid-February. On 6 April 1941, the first day of the Axis invasion of Yugoslavia Kajuh volunteered for the Yugoslav Army to defend his country. He joined a group of volunteers in the Sava Hills aiming to assist the Yugoslav Army in its fight against Germany. On 28 April, after the Nazi German occupation of northern Slovenia, he was arrested by the Gestapo and imprisoned in Slovenj Gradec. He was released in May and he hid in the Savinja Valley before escaping to Ljubljana in September, where he joined the clandestine Security Intelligence Service (VOS) of the League of Communists of Slovenia. On New Year's Eve of 1942, he also met Silva Ponikvar, to whom he dedicated a number of his most highly regarded poems. In 1943, he joined the Partisans in Inner Carniola.

His revolutionary and simple love poetry was very popular among Slovene Partisans. He used his poetic talent in order to mobilize people into fighting against the occupying forces and inspiring them hope of a return to freedom. In 1943, the first Kajuh's poem collection was published in collaboration with his close friend Marta Paulin (nom de guerre Brina) and sculptor Janez Weiss (nom de guerre Belač) in 38 copies in difficult mid-war circumstances. It was followed in 1945 by a comprehensive collection that was edited by Mile Klopčič and published in Ljubljana.

Kajuh was in touch with his contemporary Slovene literary scene. He maintained contacts with renowned authors such as Tone Seliškar, Matej Bor, and Prežihov Voranc. He also met with Oton Župančič who was considered at the time to be the most important poet writing in Slovene. Although the details of their meetings remain unknown, the young poet apparently left a huge impression on Župančič, who stated his enthusiasm for Kajuh's work.

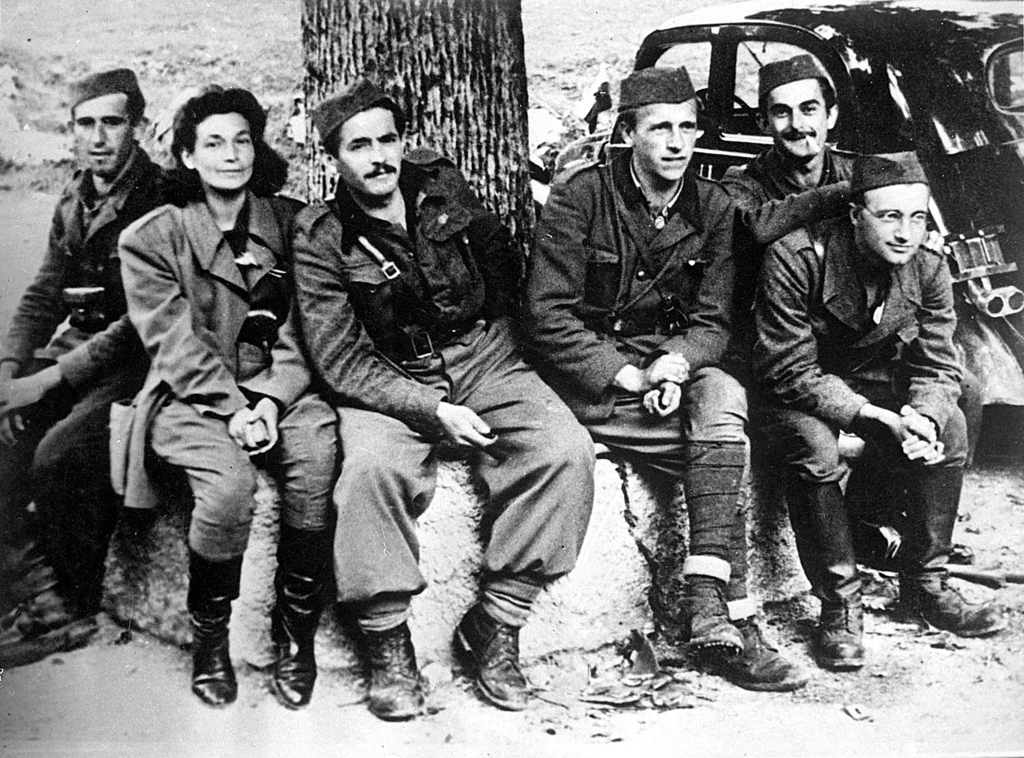
The cultural section of the 14th Slovene Partisan Division

After joining the Partisans, Kajuh became the leader of the cultural section in his military unit, the 14th Slovene Partisan Division. On 6 January 1944, the division left the region of White Carniola in the Province of Ljubljana where it was stationed in order to reach Lower Styria through the Croatian soil. They reached their final destination on 6 February of the same year, facing a massive German offensive and a bitterly cold winter. The cultural section of the unit was based in a house in the small locality of Žlebnik. The house was attacked by a German patrol and Kajuh was one of the first to be killed.

The circumstances of his death are unclear. One account states that Kajuh was shot by a Slovene, Franc Černe, who was a member of the German group. Other accounts say that he was shot in the back by the Partisans while attempting to surrender to the Germans, or that he was killed when a Partisan guard mistook him for a German.

== Legacy ==
On 21 July 1953, Kajuh was declared a People's Hero of Yugoslavia.

Both Kajuh as a person and his poetry are considered one of the most important symbols of the Slovene Partisan movement during World War II. A primary school in Ljubljana and the Kajuh Literary Prize are named after him, as are several streets and squares throughout Slovenia. In Celje, an entire town district is named after him. Together with France Balantič, Matej Bor, and Edvard Kocbek, Kajuh is regarded as one of the most important poets of the Second World War in the Slovene lands.

Kajuh's poems became very popular among the Slovenes due to their direct appeal, melodic intonation, and simplicity. Major research and work on Kajuh's life and legacy has been done by Emil Cesar, Matjaž Kmecl, Mihael Glavan, Miklavž Komelj, Vladimir Vrbič, and others. In 2022, the National and University Library of Slovenia digitised Kajuh's writings, letters and photos. Slovenian composer Breda Šček set Kajuh’s text to music. The government of Slovenia declared 2023 the Year of Karel Destovnik Kajuh.

== Sources ==
- Emil Cesar, Karel Destovnik Kajuh, Ljubljana 1979
