= Bele Vode, Šoštanj =

Bele Vode
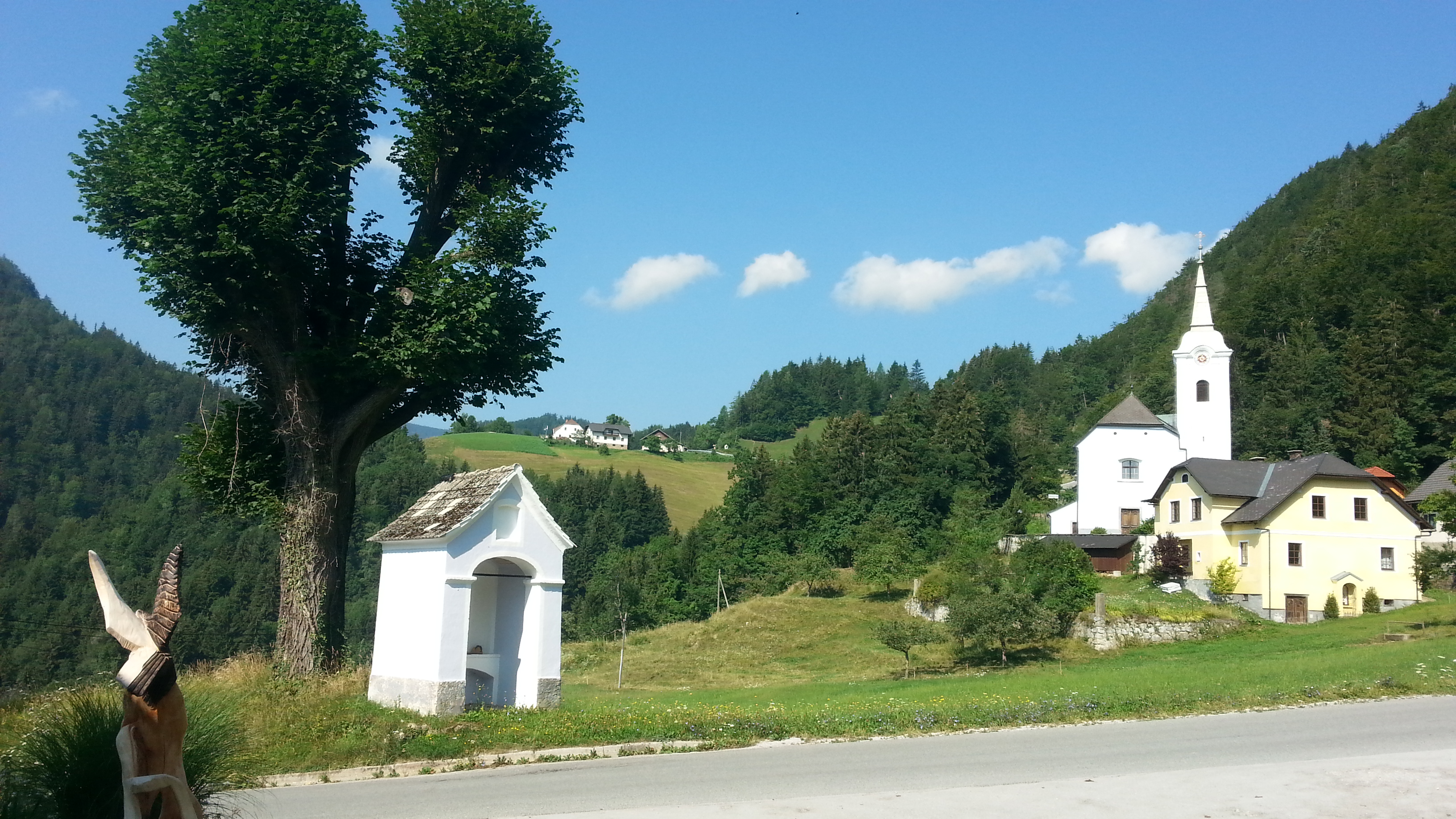

- Location in Slovenia
- Coordinates: 46°24′34.64″N 14°55′14.86″E
- Country: Slovenia
- Traditional region: Styria
- Statistical region: Savinja
- Municipality: Šoštanj

Area
  - Total: 24.12 km^{2} (9.31 sq mi)
- Elevation: 1,085.2 m (3,560 ft)

Population (2002)
  - Total: 240

Bele Vode (pronounced [ˈbeːlɛ ˈʋɔːdɛ]) is a settlement in the Municipality of Šoštanj in northern Slovenia. It lies in the Mozirje Hills (Slovene: Mozirske planine) northwest of the town of Šoštanj. The area is part of the traditional region of Styria. The entire municipality is now included in the Savinja Statistical Region. The settlement includes the hamlets of Kloše, Punčkov Vrh, Visočki Vrh, and Zaloka.

== Name ==
The name Bele Vode is originally a hydronym, literally meaning 'white waters'. The adjective bele 'white' may refer to the light color of the water as it flows over rocks, or it may refer to limestone cliffs or deciduous (in comparison to "black", i.e. coniferous) forest that the water flows through. It may also be an old designation indicating 'west', 'right', 'large', or 'major'.

== History ==
The ancient settlement of the area is attested by early Paleolithic finds in Morn Cave (Slovene: Mornova zijalka), discovered by Srečko Brodar in 1936. The chert and quartzite artifacts from the site have been identified as belonging to the Mousterian–pre-Aurignacian culture and dating to the Würm glaciation. The finds include the remnants of 312 posts that are probably the remains of stilt houses. Later archaeological finds include metal objects from the late Hallstatt and La Tène cultures, and Roman coins and ceramics.

A school was built in the settlement in 1905. Partisan units were active in the area during the Second World War. A German offensive against the 14th Partisan Division concluded in Bele Vode on 16 February 1944.

=== Mass graves ===
Bele Vode is the site of two known mass graves from the Second World War. Both are also known as the Oce Mass Grave (Slovene: Grobišče Oce) or Kozamurnik Farm Mass Grave (Grobišče posestvo Kozamurnikovih) and are located in some bushes and a gulch north-northwest of the Kozamurnik farm. They both contain the remains of Ukrainian prisoners of war that were murdered on 19 March 1945. The Bele Vode 1 Mass Grave (Grobišče Bele vode 1) is located about 380 m from the farm and contains the remains of six soldiers. The Bele Vode 2 Mass Grave (Grobišče Bele vode 2) is located about 270 m from the farm and contains the remains of seven soldiers.

== Church ==
The parish church in the settlement is dedicated to Saint Andrew and belongs to the Roman Catholic Diocese of Celje. It was built between 1775 and 1793 on the site of two earlier buildings. The church was first mentioned in written sources in 1482. The bell dates from the first half of the 16th century, and the furnishings of the church mostly date to 1835. Two other churches, built on the top of Cross Mountain (Kriška gora, formerly known as Oslovska gora) south of the settlement core, are dedicated to the Feast of the Cross. The older one was built between 1833 and 1840, and the other between 1850 and 1857. The churches were a popular pilgrimage destination in the 19th century, indicated by the large number of votive offerings at the church, including animal figurines. A Scala Sancta shrine at the site is decorated with frescoes by Tomaž Fantoni dating to 1873.
