= Paška Vas =

- Location in Slovenia
- Coordinates: 46°20′28.57″N 15°1′0.82″E
- Country: Slovenia
- Traditional region: Styria
- Statistical region: Savinja
- Municipality: Šmartno ob Paki

Area
  - Total: 0.62 km^{2} (0.24 sq mi)
- Elevation: 319.8 m (1,049 ft)

Population (2002)
  - Total: 204

Paška Vas (pronounced [ˈpaːʃka ˈʋaːs]; Slovene: Paška vas) is a settlement on the right bank of the Paka River in the Municipality of Šmartno ob Paki in northern Slovenia. The area is part of the traditional region of Styria. The entire municipality is now included in the Savinja Statistical Region.

A small chapel-shrine in the settlement containing a statue of Saint Mark dates to the last quarter of the 19th century.
