= Upper Carniola Basin =

The Upper Carniola Basin (Slovene: Gorenjska kotlina) is a structural basin in Slovenia that lies north of Ljubljana. The basin is bounded by the Sava Fault in the north and the Žužemberk Fault in the south. The basin is filled by Quaternary alluvial sediments.
