= Skorno, Šmartno ob Paki =

Skorno
- Location in Slovenia
- Coordinates: 46°21′25.25″N 15°0′35.11″E
- Country: Slovenia
- Traditional region: Styria
- Statistical region: Savinja
- Municipality: Šmartno ob Paki

Area
  - Total: 3.33 km^{2} (1.29 sq mi)
- Elevation: 452.5 m (1,485 ft)

Population (2002)
  - Total: 208

Skorno (pronounced [ˈskoːɾnɔ]) is a settlement in the Municipality of Šmartno ob Paki in northern Slovenia. It lies in the hills above the right bank of the Paka River northwest of Šmartno. The area is part of the traditional region of Styria. The entire municipality is now included in the Savinja Statistical Region.
