= Topolšica =

- Location in Slovenia
- Coordinates: 46°24′12.06″N 15°1′6.05″E
- Country: Slovenia
- Traditional region: Styria
- Statistical region: Savinja
- Municipality: Šoštanj

Area
  - Total: 11.47 km^{2} (4.43 sq mi)
- Elevation: 379.1 m (1,244 ft)

Population (2002)
  - Total: 1,191

Topolšica (pronounced [tɔˈpoːu̯ʃitsa] or [tɔˈpoːlʃitsa]) is a settlement in the Municipality of Šoštanj in northern Slovenia. The area is part of the traditional region of Styria. The municipality is now included in the Savinja Statistical Region. The Topolšica spa and the Topolšica Hospital are located in the settlement.

== History ==
At the end of the Second World War after the German Instrument of Surrender, General Löhr signed the act of surrender on 9 May 1945 in the spa building in the settlement. The room is now a small museum that commemorates the event.

== Church ==
The local church is dedicated to Saint James (Slovene: sveti Jakob) and belongs to the Parish of Šoštanj. It dates to the 16th century with major rebuilding around 1830.

== Notable people ==
- Pavla Rovan (1908–1999), Slovenian poet and writer, died in Topolšica on 12 June 1999
- Veno Taufer (1933–2023), Slovenian poet, essayist, translator, and playwright, died in Topolšica on 20 May 2023
