= Zavodnje =

- Location in Slovenia
- Coordinates: 46°25′25.9″N 15°1′1.86″E
- Country: Slovenia
- Traditional region: Styria
- Statistical region: Savinja
- Municipality: Šoštanj

Area
  - Total: 10.33 km^{2} (3.99 sq mi)
- Elevation: 642.3 m (2,107 ft)

Population (2002)
  - Total: 295

Zavodnje (pronounced [ˈzaːʋɔdnjɛ]) is a settlement in the Municipality of Šoštanj in northern Slovenia. The area is part of the traditional region of Styria. The municipality is now included in the Savinja Statistical Region.

The parish church in the settlement is dedicated to Saint Peter and belongs to the Roman Catholic Diocese of Celje. It was built in 1813 on the site of a chapel associated with Žamberk Castle, a 13th-century castle demolished in the 16th century.
