= Mali Vrh, Šmartno ob Paki =

Mali Vrh
- Location in Slovenia
- Coordinates: 46°19′55.5″N 15°2′42.74″E
- Country: Slovenia
- Traditional region: Styria
- Statistical region: Savinja
- Municipality: Šmartno ob Paki

Area
  - Total: 0.95 km^{2} (0.37 sq mi)
- Elevation: 375.3 m (1,231 ft)

Population (2002)
  - Total: 360

Mali Vrh (pronounced [ˈmaːli ˈʋəɾx]) is a settlement in the Municipality of Šmartno ob Paki in northern Slovenia. The area is part of the traditional region of Styria. The municipality is now included in the Savinja Statistical Region.
