= Veliki Vrh, Šmartno ob Paki =

Veliki Vrh
- Location in Slovenia
- Coordinates: 46°20′49.93″N 15°2′13.32″E
- Country: Slovenia
- Traditional region: Styria
- Statistical region: Savinja
- Municipality: Šmartno ob Paki

Area
  - Total: 4.94 km^{2} (1.91 sq mi)
- Elevation: 523.2 m (1,717 ft)

Population (2002)
  - Total: 239

Veliki Vrh (pronounced [ˈʋeːliki ˈʋəɾx]) is a settlement in the Municipality of Šmartno ob Paki in northern Slovenia. It lies in the hills north of Šmartno. The entire area is part of the traditional region of Styria and is now included in the Savinja Statistical Region.
