= Gaberke =

Gaberke Gabrke (until 1988)
- Location in Slovenia
- Coordinates: 46°23′26.29″N 15°4′42.29″E
- Country: Slovenia
- Traditional region: Styria
- Statistical region: Savinja
- Municipality: Šoštanj

Area
  - Total: 3.61 km^{2} (1.39 sq mi)
- Elevation: 387.3 m (1,271 ft)

Population (2002)
  - Total: 673

Gaberke (pronounced [ˈɡaːbɛɾkɛ], in older sources also Gaberk, German: Gaberg) is a settlement in the Municipality of Šoštanj in northern Slovenia. The area is part of the traditional region of Styria. The entire municipality is now included in the Savinja Statistical Region.

== Name ==
The name of the settlement was changed from Gabrke to Gaberke in 1988.

== Church ==
The local church is dedicated to Saint Ulrich (Slovene: sveti Urh) and belongs to the Parish of Šoštanj. It was built in 1828 on the site of a 16th-century church.
