= Florjan, Šoštanj =

Florjan Sveti Florjan (until 1955), Sveti Florjan pri Šoštanju (1955–1984)
- Location in Slovenia
- Coordinates: 46°23′46.38″N 15°0′6.4″E
- Country: Slovenia
- Traditional region: Styria
- Statistical region: Savinja
- Municipality: Šoštanj

Area
  - Total: 3.99 km^{2} (1.54 sq mi)
- Elevation: 487.4 m (1,599 ft)

Population (2002)
  - Total: 759

Florjan (pronounced [flɔɾˈjaːn]) is a settlement in the Municipality of Šoštanj in northern Slovenia. The area is part of the traditional region of Styria. The municipality is now included in the Savinja Statistical Region.

== Name ==
The name of the settlement was changed from Sveti Florjan to Sveti Florjan pri Šoštanju in 1955. The name was changed again in 1984 to Florjan.

== Church ==
The local church from which the settlement gets its name is dedicated to Saint Florian and belongs to the Parish of Šoštanj. It dates to the 16th century.
