= Savinja and Šalek Valley =

Region of Slovenia

Savinja and Šalek Valley Savinjska in Šaleška dolina SAŠA region
- Region
- Location in Slovenia
- Coordinates: 46°21′45″N 15°06′52″E

Area
  - Total: 705.6 km^{2} (272.4 sq mi)
- Elevation: 400 m (1,300 ft)

Population (2013)
  - Total: 61,442
  - Density: 87.1/km^{2} (226/sq mi)
- Time zone: UTC+01:00 (CET)
  - Summer (DST): UTC+02:00 (CEST)
- Postal code: 3331
- Area code: 03 (+386 3 from abroad)
- Google Maps: Velenje, Slovenia
- Website: www.mozaik-dozivetij.si

The Savinja and Šalek Valley (Slovene: Savinjska in Šaleška dolina) is a region in northern Slovenia, close to the border with Austria.

== Municipalities ==
Gornji Grad, Solčava, Rečica ob Savinji, Ljubno ob Savinji, Luče, Nazarje, Šmartno ob Paki, Mozirje, Šoštanj, and Velenje.

== Tourism ==
The main tourist destinations in the area:

- Nature Parks: the Logar Valley, the Roban Cirque (Slovene: Robanov kot), the Matk Cirque (Slovene: Matkov kot), Golte
- Golte ski and hiking area
- Solčava Panoramic Road
- City of Velenje
- Topolšica Spa

== Gallery ==
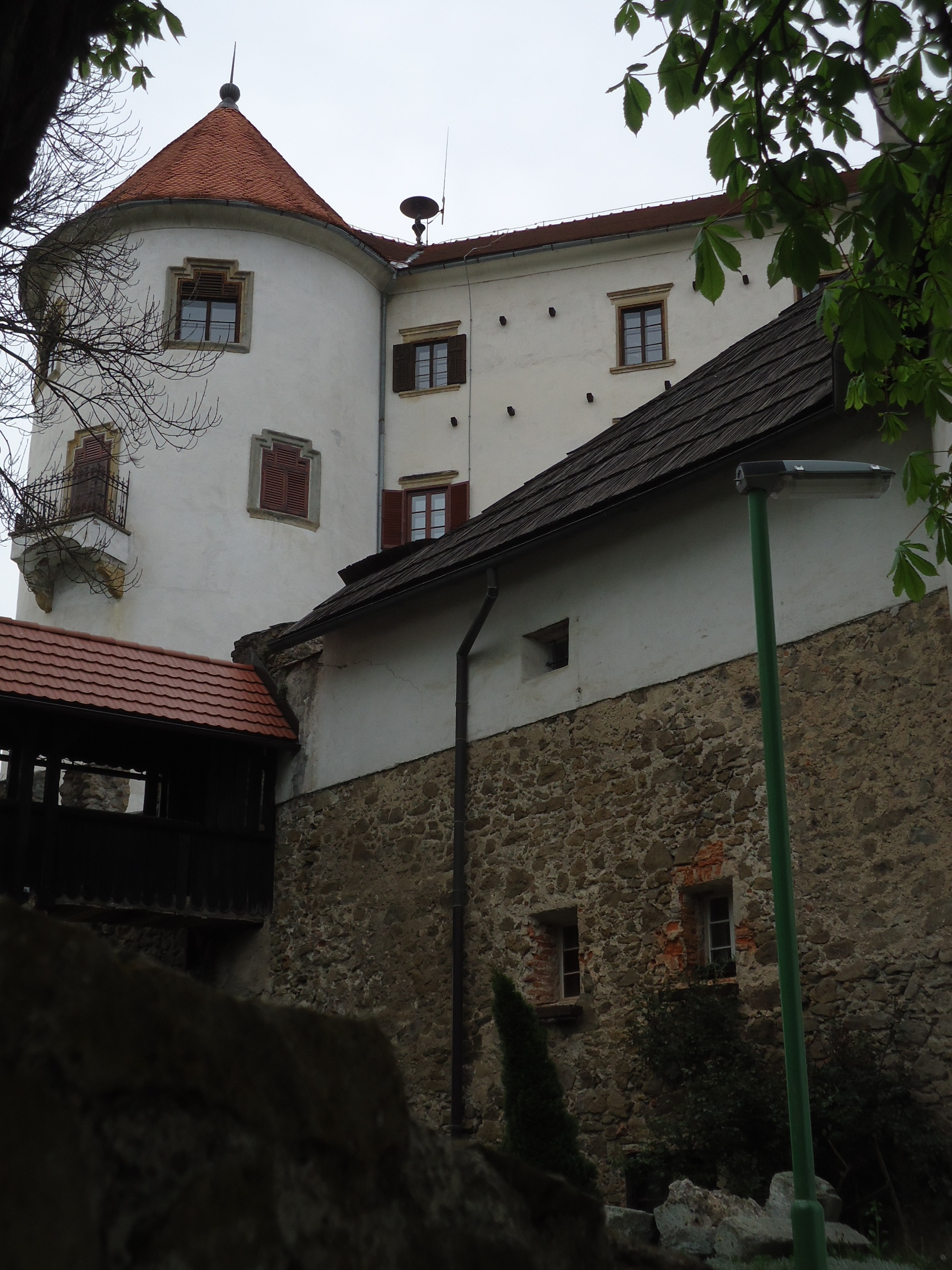
Velenje Castle in the Savinja and Šalek Valley

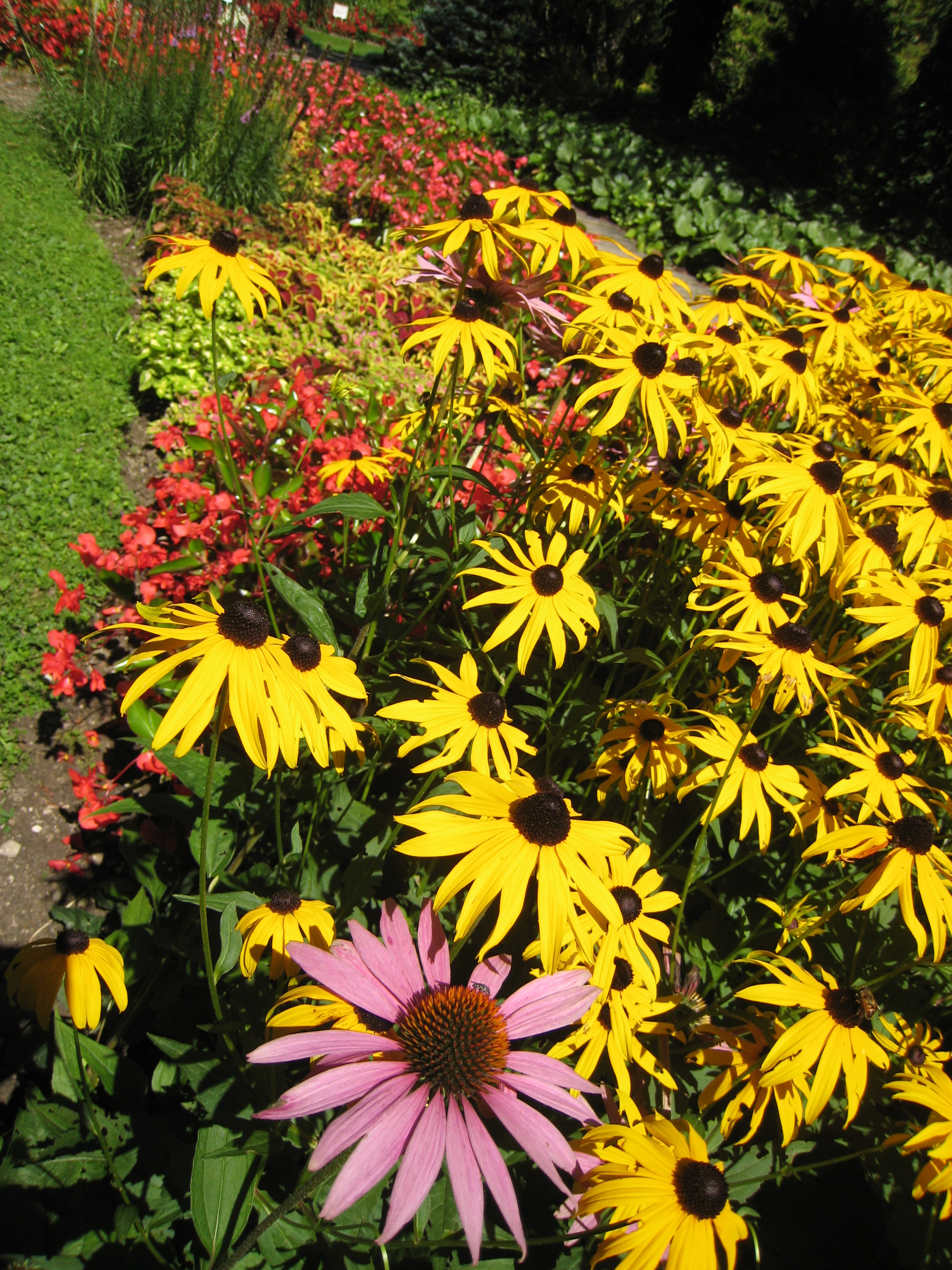
Thousands of flowers in Mozirski Gaj Flower Park

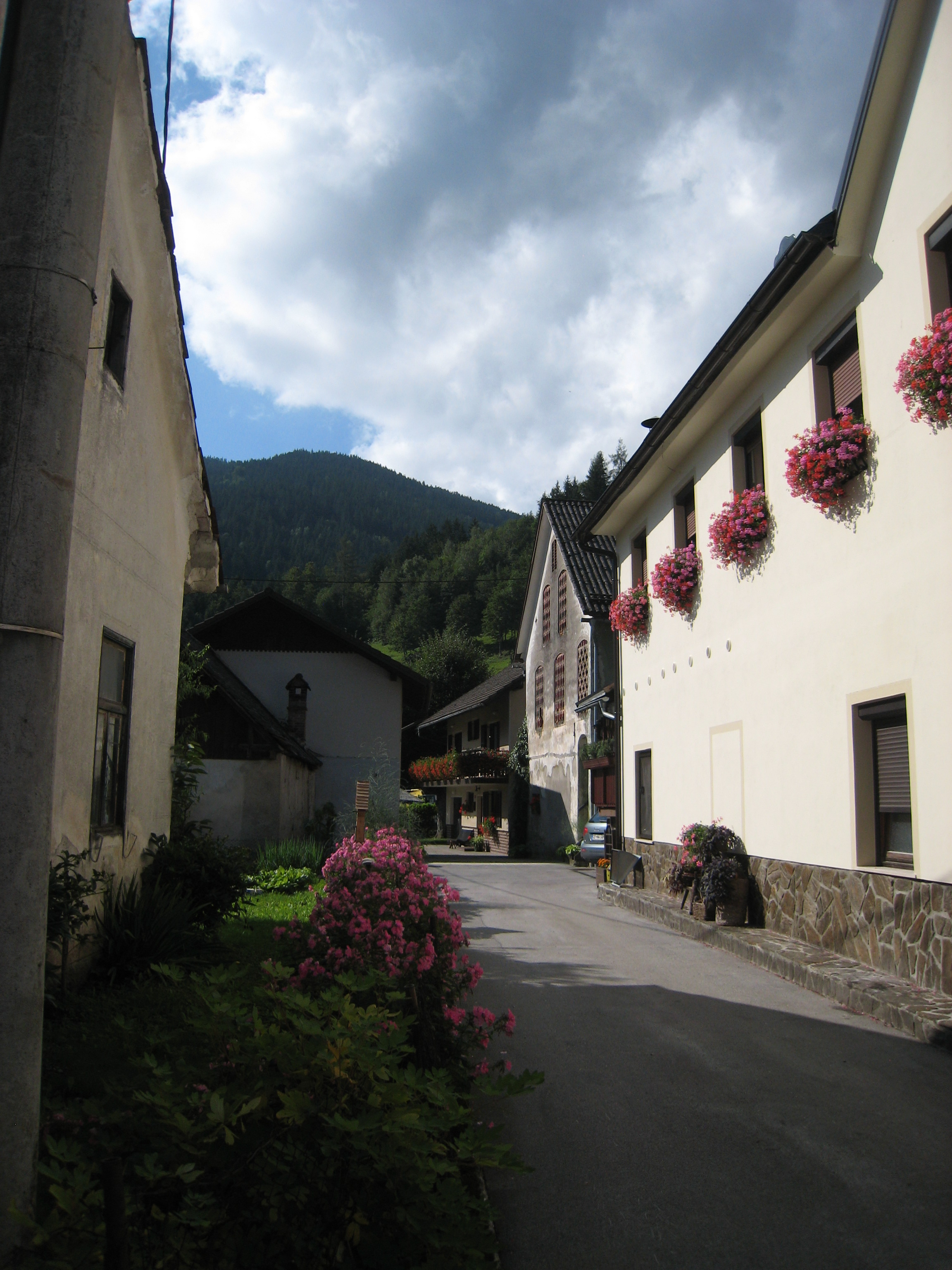
Luče is a good starting point for hiking

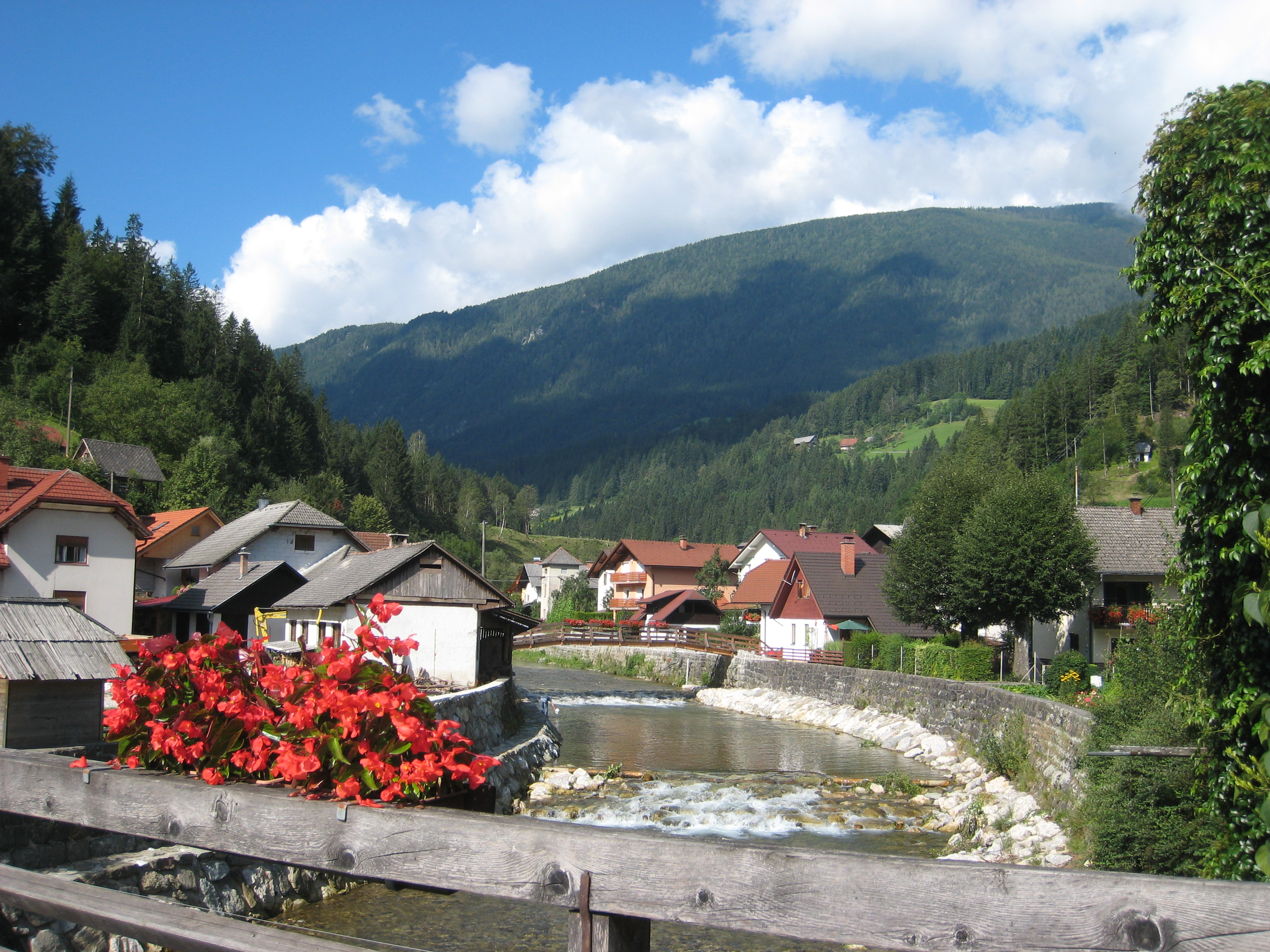
The Savinja River

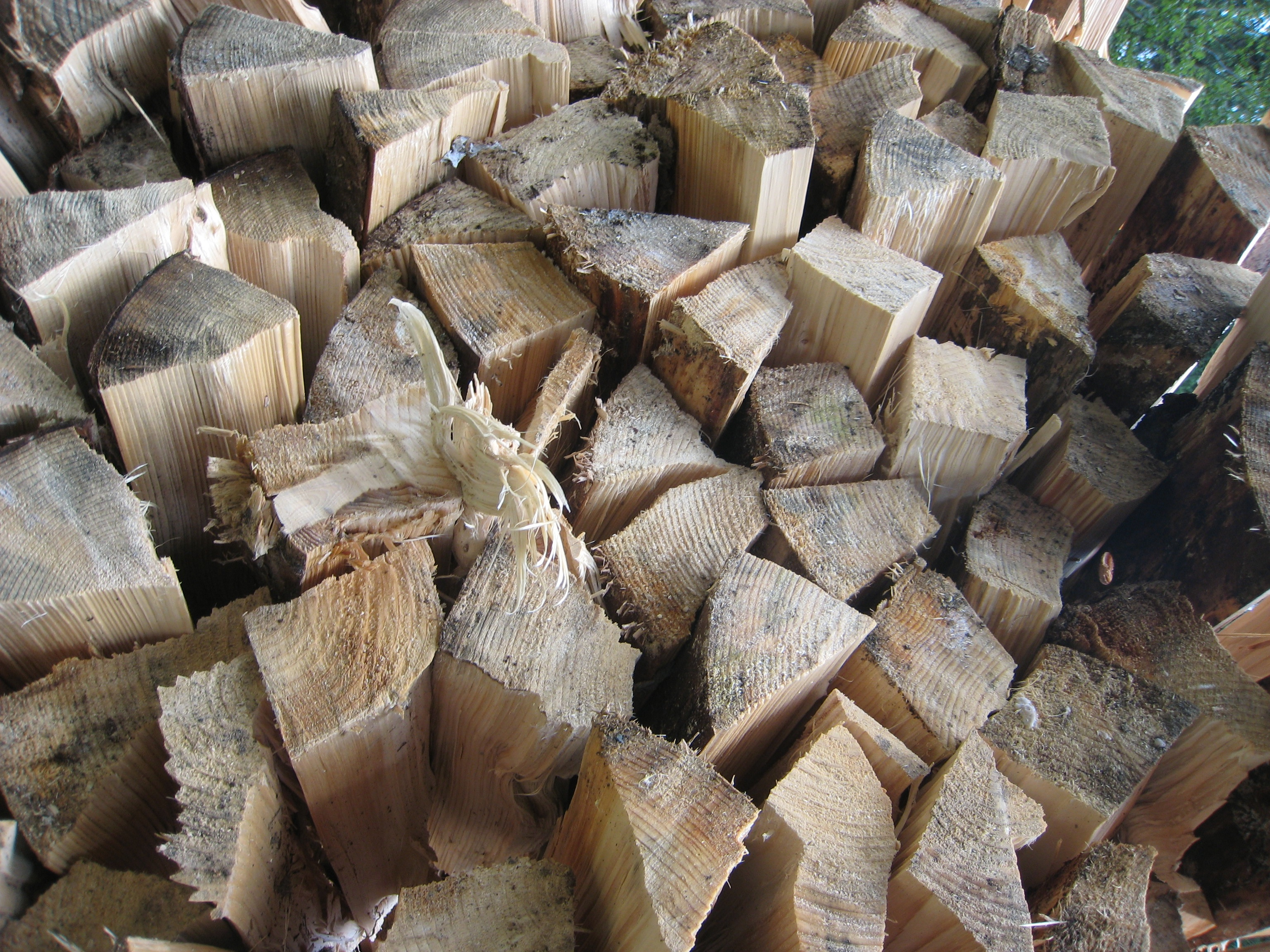
The Upper Savinja Valley has a strong tradition of wood

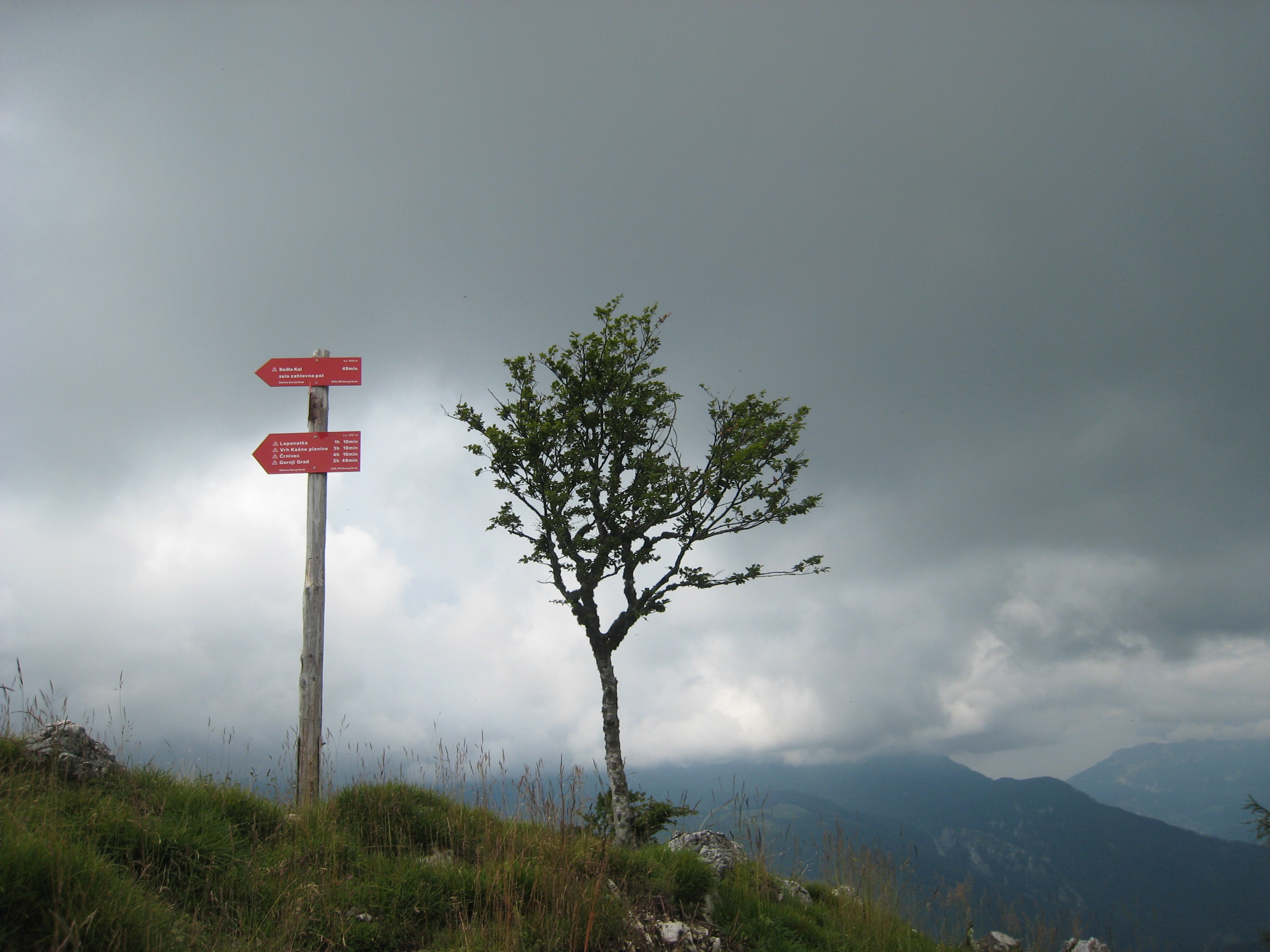
The top of Rogatec

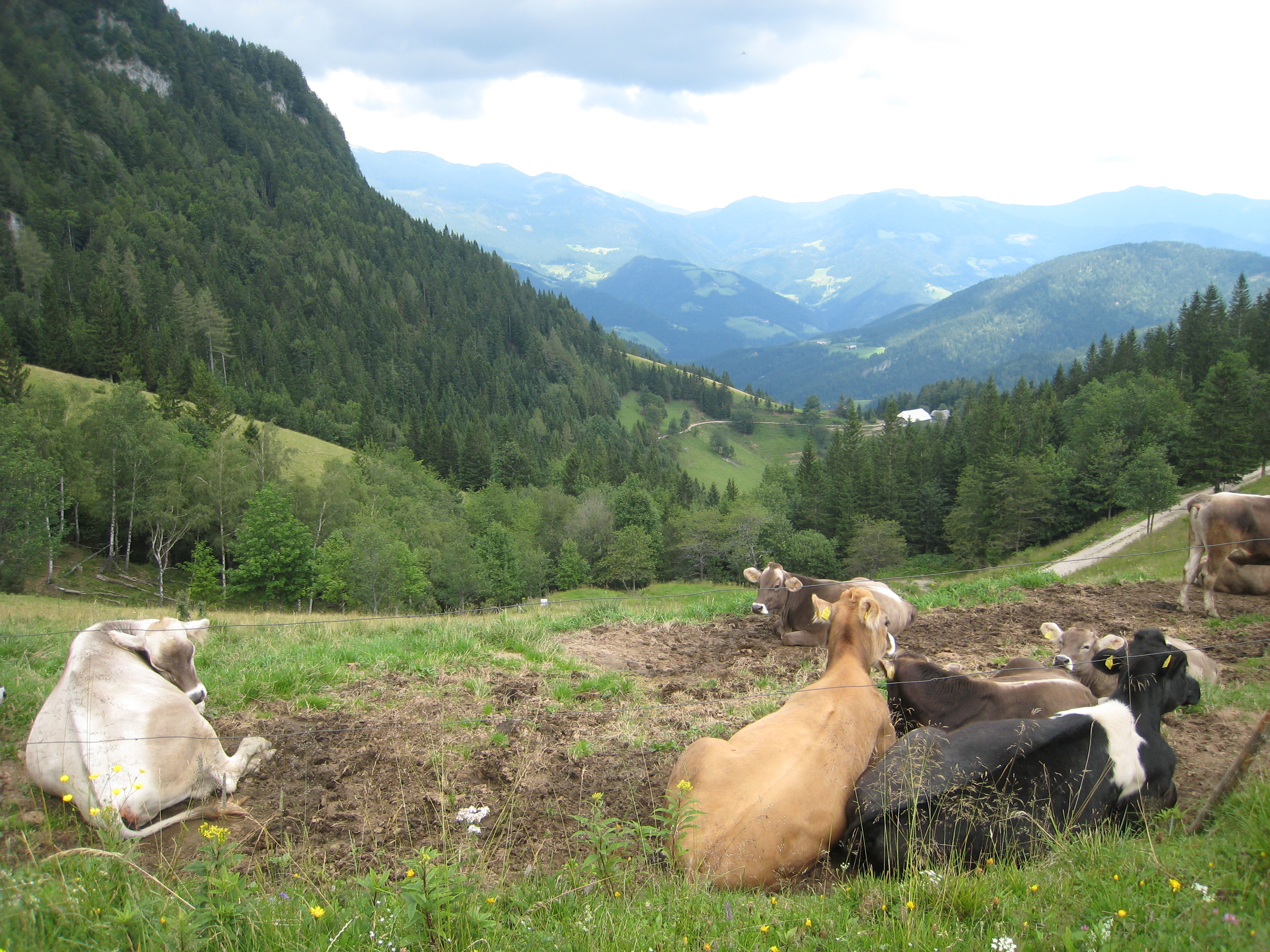
Hiking near Lepenatka and Rogatec

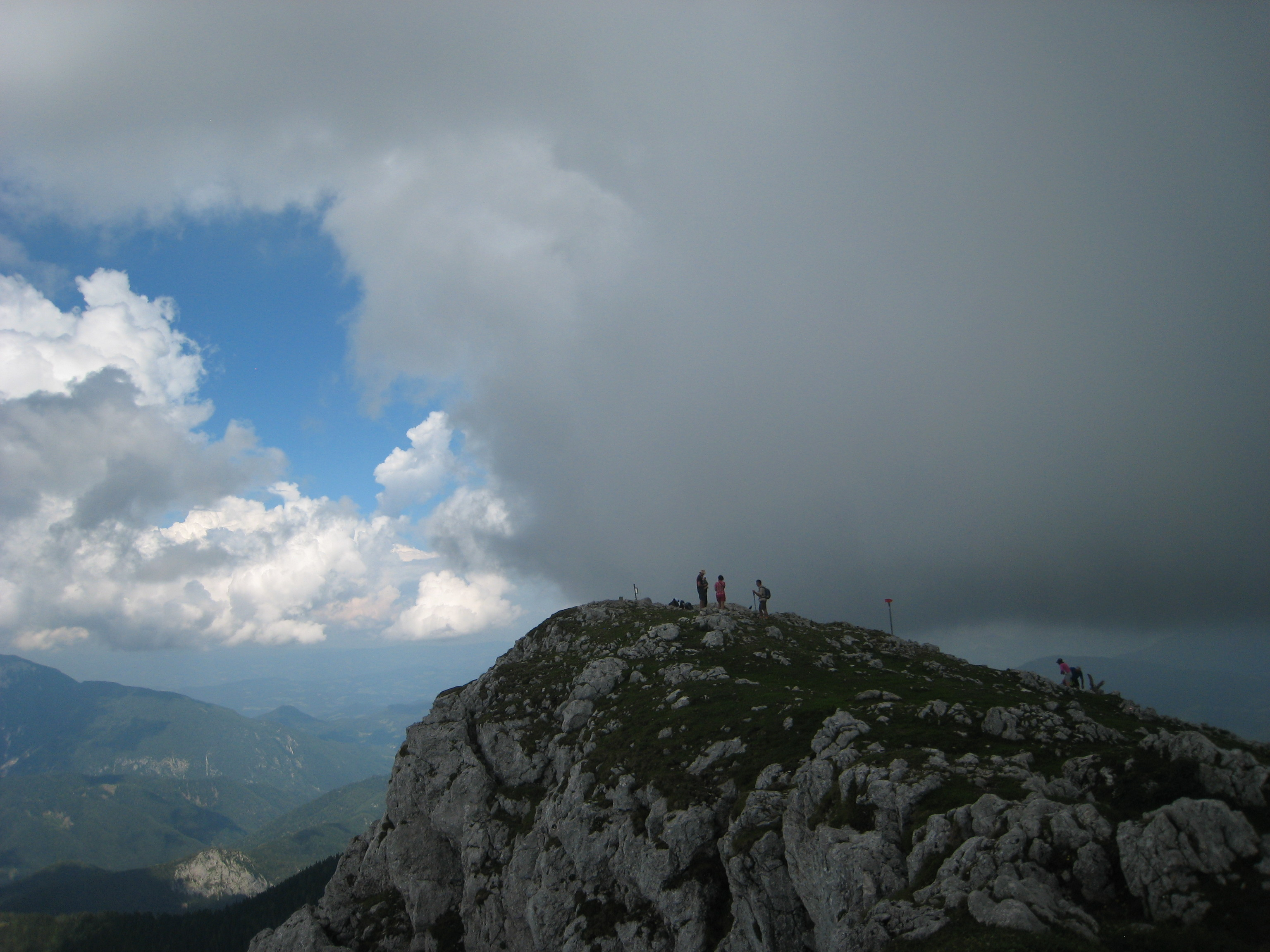
Mount Raduha in the Savinja and Šalek Valley

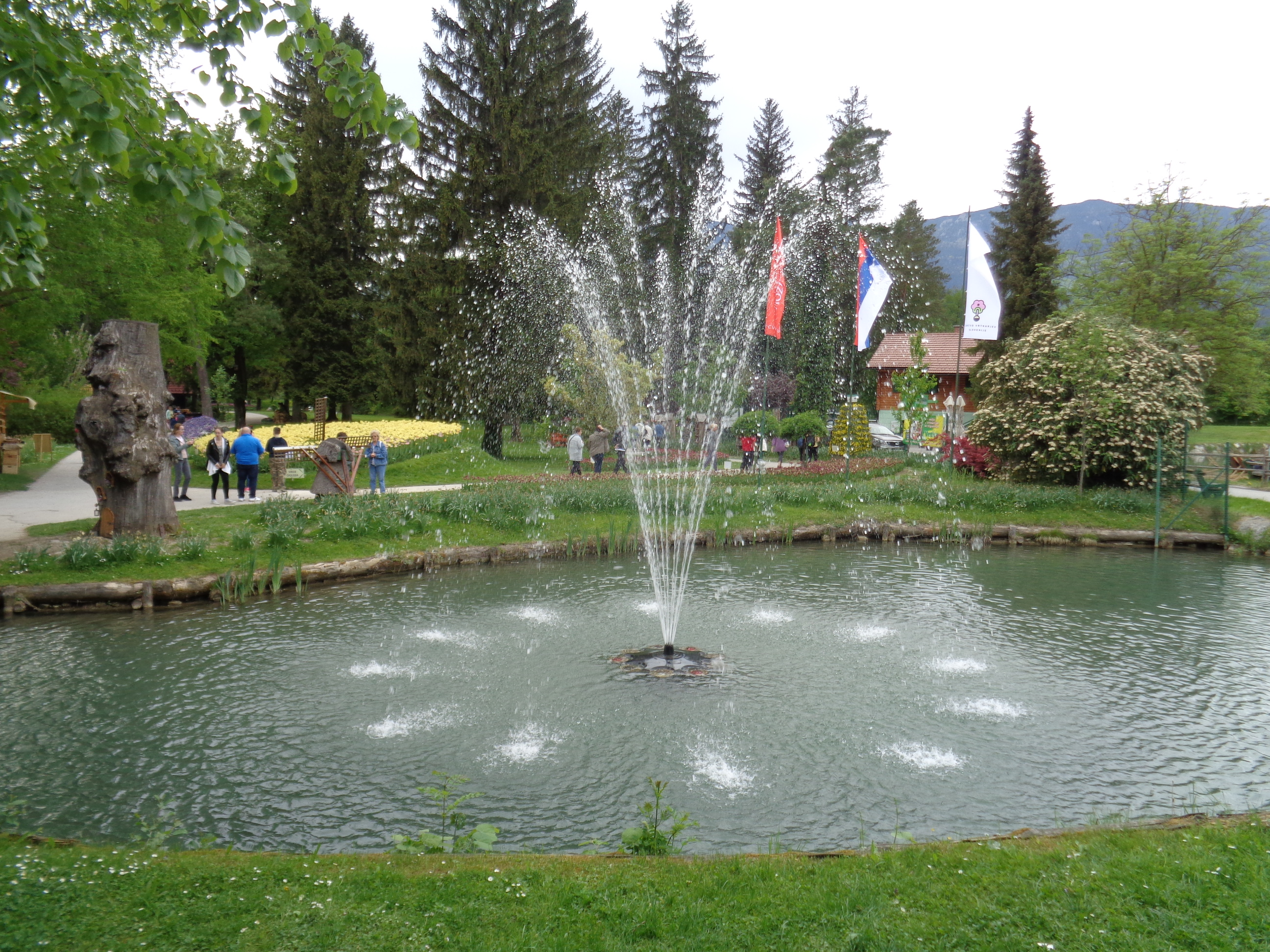
Fountain in the Mozirski Gaj Flower Park

== See also ==
- Velenje
- Savinja River
- Šalek Valley
- Logar Valley
- Solčava
