= Šmartno ob Paki =

Settlement in Slovenia

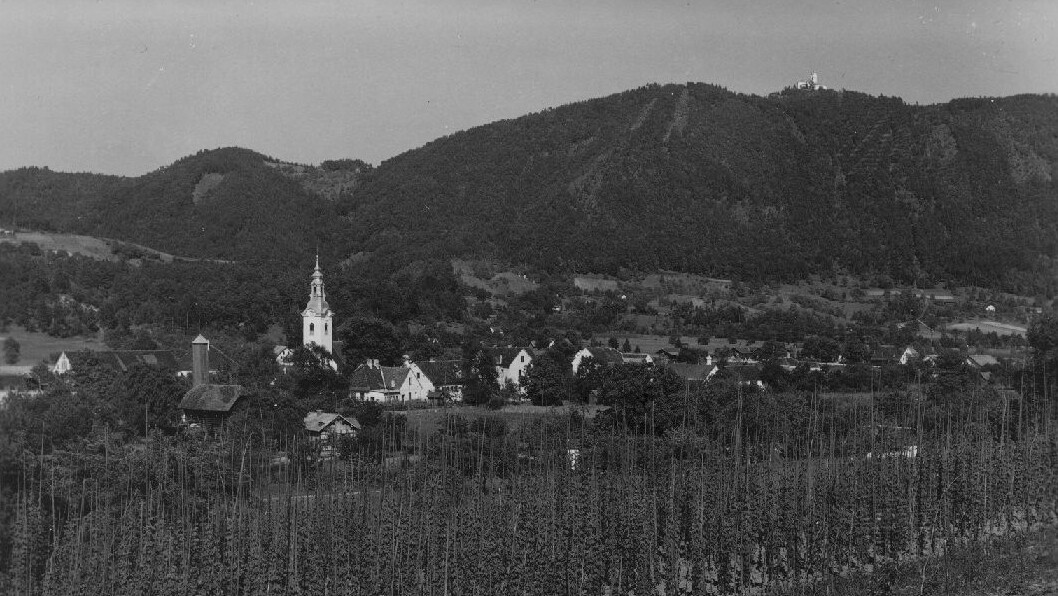
- Postcard of Šmartno ob Paki

- Flag Coat of arms

- Location in Slovenia
- Coordinates: 46°19′47″N 15°1′57″E
- Country: Slovenia
- Traditional region: Styria
- Statistical region: Savinja
- Municipality: Šmartno ob Paki

Area
  - Total: 0.79 km^{2} (0.31 sq mi)
- Elevation: 313.2 m (1,028 ft)

Population (2019)
  - Total: 636

Šmartno ob Paki (pronounced [ˈʃmaːɾtnɔ ɔp ˈpaːki]) is a settlement in the lower Paka Valley in northern Slovenia. It is the seat of the Municipality of Šmartno ob Paki. The area is part of the traditional region of Styria. It is now included in the Savinja Statistical Region.

The parish church from which the settlement gets its name (Šmartno < *Šmartən < *šent Martin 'Saint Martin') is dedicated to Saint Martin and belongs to the Roman Catholic Diocese of Celje. It was first mentioned in written documents dated to 1256. The current building dates to the 18th century but some 15th-century frescos are preserved in the belfry.
