= Družmirje =

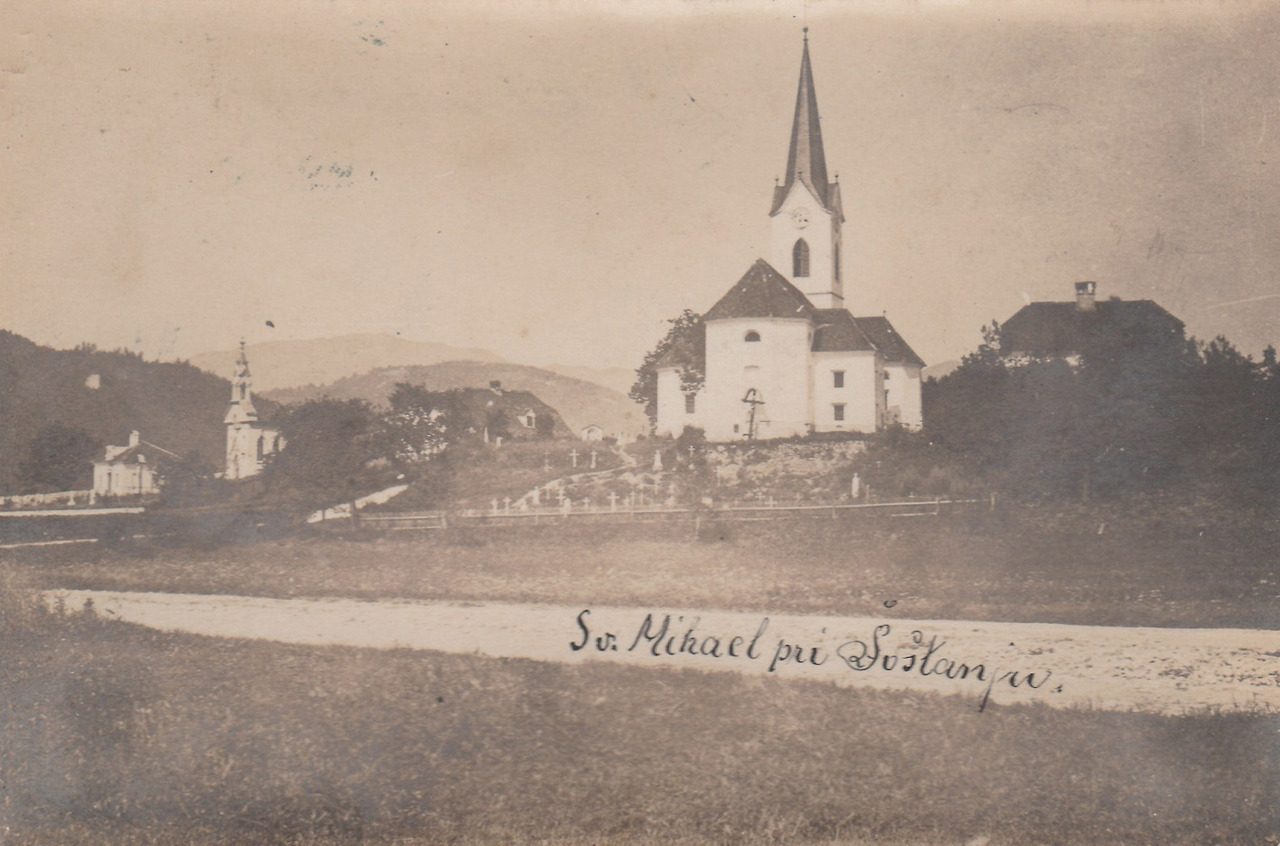
- Old postcard of Družmirje

- Location in Slovenia
- Coordinates: 46°22′34.18″N 15°3′46.06″E
- Country: Slovenia
- Traditional region: Styria
- Statistical region: Savinja
- Municipality: Šoštanj

Area
  - Total: 2.33 km^{2} (0.90 sq mi)
- Elevation: 359.8 m (1,180 ft)

Družmirje (pronounced [dɾuˈʒmiːɾjɛ], German: Schmersdorf) is a settlement in the Municipality of Šoštanj in northern Slovenia. It lies just east of Šoštanj with much of its territory flooded after the collapse of abandoned shafts in the Šoštanj lignite mine. The area is part of the traditional region of Styria. The municipality is now included in the Savinja Statistical Region.

== Name ==
Družmirje was attested in historical sources as Tresimir in 1309 (and as Stresimir in 1311, Smerstorf in 1318, and Smersdorf in 1424). The Slovenian name Družmirje is probably a clipped form of *Družimir′e selo 'Družimirъ's village', referring to an early inhabitant of the place.

== Mass graves ==
Družmirje is the site of two known mass graves from the period immediately after the Second World War. The Družmirje 1 and 2 mass graves (Slovene: Grobišče Družmirje 1, 2) lie north of Lake Šoštanj. They contain the remains of Slovene, Croatian, and German civilians that were murdered on the Gorica Ridge northeast of the town in late May 1945 as they were fleeing to Carinthia. The victims include a group of wealthy Šoštanj residents murdered on 23 May 1945. The first site lies north of a crossroads. The second site encompasses three separate burial places in the Lep Thicket (Lepova gošča). The graves are part of the same group as the Gorica 1–4 mass graves in Šoštanj.
