= Rovan =

Rovan is a surname and given name. Notable people with the name include:

Surname

- Joseph Rovan (1918-2004), French writer
- Jurij Rovan (born 1975), Slovene pole vaulter
- Pavla Rovan (1908-1999), Slovene poet
- Ruggero Rovan (1877–1965), Italian sculptor

Given name
