= Emil Cesar =

Slovenian literary historian (1927–2020)

Emil Cesar (16 August 1927 – 12 September 2020) was a Slovenian literary historian, editor, and former professor at the University of Ljubljana.

== Life and work ==
Emil Cesar was born on 16 August 1927 in Ljubljana as the son of Jernej Cesar (1881–1954), a locomotive engineer from Veliki Kal, and Marija Cesar (née Zupančič, 1896–1972). He graduated in 1947 and furthered his studies at the University of Ljubljana, where he graduated in Slovene language and literature in 1953. After his graduation, he became a middle school teacher. In 1977 he started lecturing on contemporary Slovene literature at the Faculty of Education at the University of Ljubljana. He received his PhD in 1990.

Cesar started publishing literary history articles in 1954. His work focuses on Slovene literature during the period between the two world wars and the literature of Slovene resistance against the Nazi takeover during the Second World War, particularly of Karel Destovnik Kajuh and working-class writers. Among his work are also numerous forewords, studies, and commentaries on many publications by other authors, as well as anthologies. From 1982 to 1988, he was the main editor of the magazine Obzornik, where he emphasized the Slovene outlook of the publication.

== List of works ==
- Karel Destovnik-Kajuh. Življenje in delo. (Pesmi v angl. prev.) (1968) COBISS 156410880 (Slovene)
- Karel Destovnik-Kajuh (1979) COBISS 143236864 (Slovene)
- Lovro Kuhar – Prežihov Voranc v narodnoosvobodilnem boju. Koroški fužinar (1980) COBISS 41874432 (Slovene)
- Lovro Kuhar – Prežihov Voranc v narodnoosvobodilnem boju. Borec (1980) COBISS 41874944 (Slovene)
- Svitanja: pesništvo ljudske revolucije Jugoslavije 1941–1945 (1982) COBISS 680734 (Slovene)
- Boj brez puške (1984) COBISS 475422 (Slovene)
- Slovenski marksistični tisk v tujini in knjigarna Horizonti v Parizu. Borec (1989) COBISS 8683010 (Slovene)
- Dva pomembna prijatelja koroških Slovencev. Vestnik koroških partizanov (1989) COBISS 12030210 (Slovene)
- Nove najdbe leposlovnih del Boga Flandra – Klusovega Jože. Borec (1990) COBISS 35482624
- Popravek in dopolnilo k izjavam Lovra Kuharja – Prežihovega Voranca o Ksaverju Mešku. Borec (1990) COBISS 35575040 (Slovene)
- Miha Klinar in njegova pesniška pričevanja o Koroški. Vestnik koroških partizanov (1991) COBISS 36386304 (Slovene)
- Svetovna popotnica in pisateljica Alma M. Karlin v partizanih. Borec (1992) COBISS 1803317
- Karel Destovnik Kajuh (1993) COBISS 36254720
- Pozabljeni Ivan Vuk: 1882–1939. Prešernov koledar (1993) COBISS 11172411
- Pisatelj Jože Pahor: ob tridesetletnici njegove smrti. Prešernov koledar (1994) COBISS 874801 (Slovene)
- Nova knjiga kratke proze: Med ognji. Delo (1994) COBISS 46399744 (Slovene)
- Naprej – toda ne pozabimo. Borec (1994) COBISS 50882816 (Slovene)
- »--- tudi med nas je često zavel ledeni dih smrti ---«: pisatelji – žrtve druge svetovne vojne. Naš koledar (1995) COBISS 51918848 (Slovene)
- Kako sem na literarnih poteh spoznaval nove in nove ljudi: ob izidu pesmi Antona Medveda. Delo (1995) COBISS 46349568 (Slovene)
- Slovenska kultura v obdobju okupacije in narodnoosvobodilnega boja: od aprila 1941 do 8. septembra 1943 (1996) COBISS 56223744 (Slovene)
- Kulturni molk. Naš zbornik (1996) COBISS 57911040 (Slovene)
- Slovenska oziroma jugoslovanska zveza pri reševanju nemških in avstrijskih pisateljev antifašistov. Naš zbornik (1997) COBISS 72875776 (Slovene)
- O pesniku Severinu Šaliju in o cenzuri: prispevek k novejši literarnozgodovinski raziskavi slovenske književnosti. Rast (1997) COBISS 6111543 (Slovene)
- Partizanstvo Mirana Jarca. Rast (1998) COBISS 98867968 (Slovene)
- Oblike literarnega in organiziranega političnega odpora Lili Novy med okupacijo. Borec (1999) COBISS 3451721 (Slovene)
- Partizanstvo Mirana Jarca. Rast (1999) COBISS 7323703 (Slovene)
- Pesnik Ivan Rob v partizanih in njegova smrt. Rast (1999) COBISS 7921719 (Slovene)
- Klopčičeva »Mati«: v 1943. letu odmevno literarno sporočilo svetu o slovenskem odporu. Rast (2000) COBISS 8628535 (Slovene)
- Literarnozgodovinski portreti (2000) COBISS 109022464 (Slovene)
- Narod, ki se bojuje s knjigo, ne more biti premagan: kongres slovenskih kulturnih delavcev v Semiču januarja 1944. Rast (2001) COBISS 9315127 (Slovene)
- Umolknil je trs: dr. Stanku Vuku – pesniku slovenske zemlje na Zahodu. Borec (2001) COBISS 124600320
- Slovenska kultura v obdobju okupacije in narodnoosvobodilnega boja: (od 8. septembra 1943 do 9. maja 1945) (2007) COBISS 233763840 (Slovene)
