= Skorno pri Šoštanju =

- Location in Slovenia
- Coordinates: 46°22′31.97″N 15°0′49.16″E
- Country: Slovenia
- Traditional region: Styria
- Statistical region: Savinja
- Municipality: Šoštanj

Area
  - Total: 4.66 km^{2} (1.80 sq mi)
- Elevation: 508.6 m (1,669 ft)

Population (2002)
  - Total: 345

Skorno pri Šoštanju (pronounced [ˈskoːɾnɔ pɾi ˈʃoːʃtanju]) is a settlement in the Municipality of Šoštanj in northern Slovenia. The area is part of the traditional region of Styria. The municipality is now included in the Savinja Statistical Region.

== Name ==
The name of the settlement was changed from Skorno to Skorno pri Šoštanju in 1952.

== Church ==
The local church is dedicated to Saint Anthony the Hermit and belongs to the Parish of Šoštanj. It dates to the 16th century.
