= MATK =

MATK, and its various capitalization versions, may refer to:

- MATK or Megakaryocyte-associated tyrosine kinase, a human gene
- matK or Maturase K, a plastid plant gene
- Matk Cirque, an Alpine glacial valley in Slovenia
- Main Khiladi Tu Anari, a 1994 Indian film
