= Brežice–Koprivnica Fault =

Seismogenic fault in Slovenia and Croatia

The Brežice–Koprivnica Fault is a seismogenic fault in Slovenia and Croatia close to the Slovenian-Croatian border and Zagreb. It strikes ENE-WSW and extends from Novo Mesto in the west, to Brežice and Koprivnica in the east. This is roughly the riverbed of the Krka. It is a sinistral thrust-fault that runs along the southern limb of the Krško Syncline. The movements along the fault have led to the uplift of the southeastern block which includes the Gorjanci or Žumberak mountains.
