= Sava Fault =

Seismic fault in Slovenia, Italy and Croatia

The Sava Fault (Slovene: Savski prelom, pronounced [ˈsàːwski pɾɛˈlɔ́m]) is a fault in Slovenia, Italy, and in Croatia. Its western end lies in northern Friuli-Venezia Giulia, where it strikes E-W through Tarvisio and is known as the Fella Fault. It enters Slovenia in Kranjska Gora and then bends southward to pass through Jesenice. North of Kranj the fault is oriented NW-SE. In Kamnik the fault returns to an E-W orientation and runs eastward through Celje. It then enters Croatia in Rogaška Slatina and continues to Đurmanec. Here it also merges with the Šoštanj Fault, Labot Fault (Lavanttal Fault), and Periadriatic Fault. The eastern continuation is the Drava Fault.

The movements along the Sava Fault are dextral strike-slip with an offset of about 30 to 60 km.

The Sava Fault was first recognized by Friedrich Joseph Teller in 1896.
