= Municipality of Šoštanj =

Municipality of Slovenia

Municipality of Šoštanj Občina Šoštanj
- Municipality
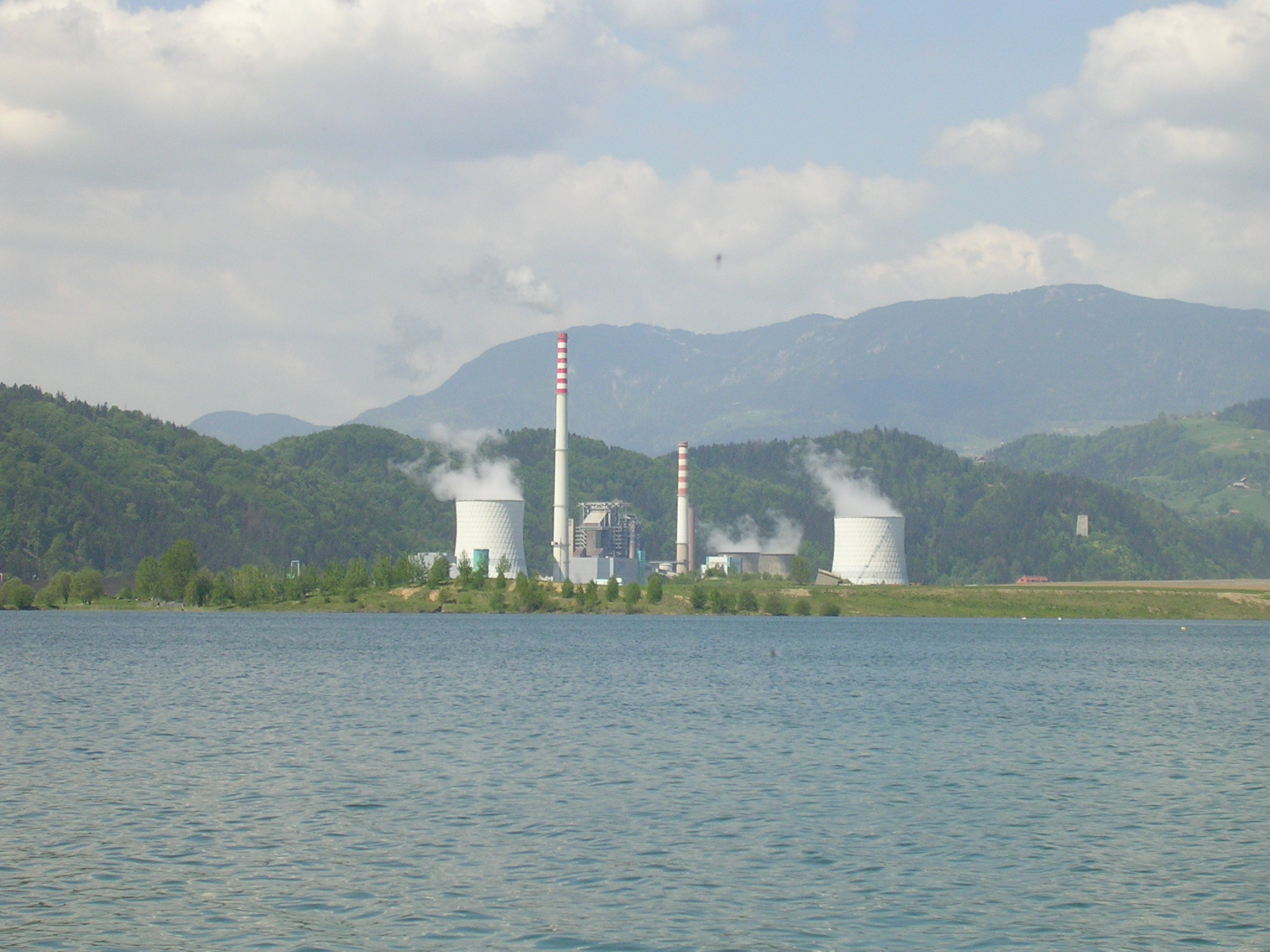

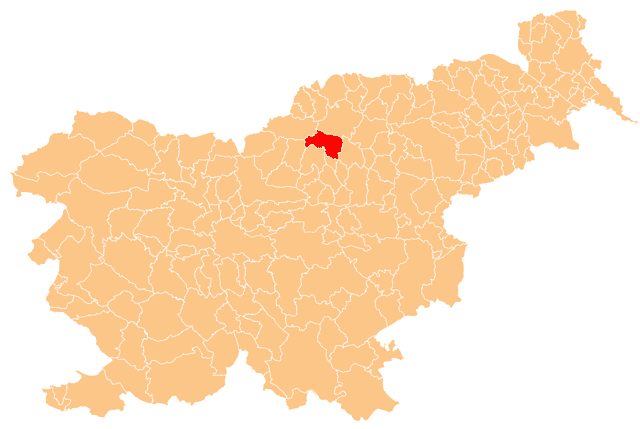
- Location of the Municipality of Šoštanj in Slovenia
- Coordinates: 46°24′N 15°3′E
- Country: Slovenia
- Established: 1994

Government
  - Mayor: Darko Menih

Area
  - Total: 95.6 km^{2} (36.9 sq mi)

Population (2002)
  - Total: 8,254
  - Density: 86.3/km^{2} (224/sq mi)
- Time zone: UTC+01 (CET)
  - Summer (DST): UTC+02 (CEST)
- Website: www.sostanj.si

The Municipality of Šoštanj (pronounced [ˈʃoːʃtan]; Slovene: Občina Šoštanj) is a municipality in northern Slovenia. The seat of the municipality is the town of Šoštanj. The municipality was established on 3 October 1994, prior to which it belonged to the larger Municipality of Velenje. The municipal holiday is celebrated on 30 October.

== Settlements ==
In addition to the namesake city, the municipality also includes the following settlements:

- Bele Vode
- Družmirje
- Florjan
- Gaberke
- Lokovica
- Ravne
- Šentvid pri Zavodnju
- Skorno pri Šoštanju
- Topolšica
- Zavodnje
