= Pavla Rovan =

Pavla Rovan was a Slovenian poet and writer, born 21 January 1908 in Frastanz, Austria. She died 12 June 1999 in Topolšica in northern Slovenia. Her name is sometimes written as Pavlo Rovan.

== Biography ==
Born Pavla Hafner, she attended elementary school in Innsbruck, Austria and continued her higher education in Innsbruck and Ljubljana, Slovenia.

During World War II, she was active in the National Liberation War and spent some time in exile in Serbia. After Slovenia's liberation, Rovan went to Velenje and participated in the city's cultural and political reconstruction. She was a member of the Slovenian Writers' Association and published stories and novels in numerous newspapers and magazines including Delavska enotnost, Novi tednik, Naše delo, Dnevnik, Večer, Dialogi, Obzornik, Naših razgledih, and Obrazi. She was also heard on Celje radio.

She died in 1999 in northern Slovenia and is buried in the cemetery in Šentjur, Slovenia.

== Awards ==
- The Kajuh Prize for the collection of stories Kje so tiste stezice (Where Are Those Paths) with a Carinthian theme
- 1979: Kajuh Award for the book Sonce in sence (Sun and Shadows)
- Commendations for literary work: 1979 Velenje, 1962 and 1974 Celje, 1975 Laško

== Selected works ==
- 1974: Sonce in sence (Sun and Shadows), novel collection
- 1976: Obrazi življenja (Faces of Life), novel collection
- 1980: Kje so tiste stezice (Where Are Those Lanes), story
- 1983: Pozabljeni listi (Forgotten Letters), poetry collection
- 1986: Odmevi (Echoes), poetry collection
- 1991: Podaj mi roko (Give Me Your Hand), poetry collection
