= Hochstuhl Fault =

Fault in Austria and Slovenia

The Hochstuhl Fault is a fault in Austria and Slovenia. It is named after Mount Stol, which is named Hochstuhl in German. The fault can be traced from Radenthein (east of Spittal an der Drau), where it follows the Gegendtal, crosses the Drau River and the Karawanks, and ends in the Sava Valley near Radovljica and Kranj. In the southeast it intersects the Periadriatic Fault, which it displaced during the Quaternary. From these movements a dextral strike-slip motion can be observed.
