= Raša Fault =

The Raša Fault (pronounced [ˈɾaːʃa]; Slovene: Raški prelom) is a seismogenic fault in Slovenia. It strikes NW-SE and runs parallel 25 km to the southwest of the Idrija Fault. Similar to the Idrija Fault, the fault plane dips towards the northeast. The movements along the fault are dextral strike-slip.

In Slovenia, the fault extends from Nova Gorica in the northwest to Ilirska Bistrica in the southeast. In Croatia, it merges into the Ilirska Bistrica – Vinodol Fault.

The Raša River follows the fault. The straight riverbed and structures close to Vremščica delineate the fault. The best exposed outcrops of the fault are near Senožeče and are preserved as heritage of national importance. Seismicity is concentrated at Mount Snežnik.
