= Žužemberk Fault =

Fault in Slovenia

The Žužemberk Fault (pronounced [ˈʒuːʒɛmbɛɾk]; Slovene: Žužemberški prelom) is a fault in Slovenia. The Upper Carniola Basin may have formed as a pull-apart basin between the dextral Žužemberk and Sava faults during the Quaternary.
