= Donat Fault =

Fault zone extending from Slovenia to Croatia

The Donat Fault (pronounced [dɔˈnaːt]; Slovene: Donački prelom) is a fault zone that extends from Slovenia to Croatia. It extends from south of Zreče in the west to east of Varaždin in the east. The fault zone strikes E-W in the west and ENE-WSW in the east. Miocene movements along the fault were dextral strike-slip. Displacement is estimated to be 50 km.
