= Municipality of Šmartno ob Paki =

Municipality of Slovenia

Municipality of Šmartno ob Paki Občina Šmartno ob Paki
- Municipality
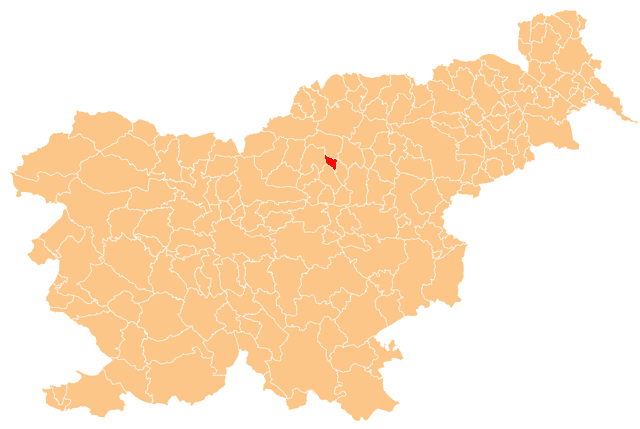
- Location of the Municipality of Šmartno ob Paki in Slovenia
- Coordinates: 46°20′N 15°2′E
- Country: Slovenia

Government
  - Mayor: Janko Kopušar

Area
  - Total: 18.2 km^{2} (7.0 sq mi)

Population (July 1, 2018)
  - Total: 3,244
  - Density: 178/km^{2} (462/sq mi)
- Time zone: UTC+01 (CET)
  - Summer (DST): UTC+02 (CEST)
- Website: www.smartnoobpaki.si

The Municipality of Šmartno ob Paki (pronounced [ˈʃmaːɾtnɔ ɔp ˈpaːki]; Slovene: Občina Šmartno ob Paki) is a municipality in the traditional region of Styria in northeastern Slovenia. The seat of the municipality is the town of Šmartno ob Paki. Šmartno ob Paki became a municipality in 1994.

== Settlements ==
In addition to the municipal seat of Šmartno ob Paki, the municipality also includes the following settlements:

- Gavce
- Gorenje
- Mali Vrh
- Paška Vas
- Podgora
- Rečica ob Paki
- Skorno
- Slatina
- Veliki Vrh
