= Šoštanj Fault =

The Šoštanj Fault (pronounced [ˈʃoːʃtan]; Slovene: Šoštanjski prelom) is a fault in Slovenia. It connects the Periadriatic Fault with the Lavanttal Fault and strikes NW-SE. Movements along the fault are dextral strike-slip and took place in the Pliocene. The fault is named after the town of Šoštanj.
