= Idrija Fault =

Seismically active fault in Slovenia

The Idrija Fault (pronounced [ˈiːdrija]; Slovene: Idrijski prelom) is a seismically active fault in Slovenia. It strikes NW–SE and the fault plane dips towards the northeast. The activity along the fault started in the Miocene with normal faulting and changed to dextral strike-slip in the Pliocene. The fault was first described by the Slovene geologist Marko Vincenc Lipold. The present displacement is measured and varies along strike but is in the order of magnitude of 0.1 mm per year.

The strongest earthquake that possibly happened along the Idrija Fault was the 1511 Idrija earthquake, which took place on 26 March 1511. It had a moment magnitude of 6.9 and achieved a maximum intensity of X ("very destructive") as per the EMS scale. It caused 3,000 deaths and extensive damage. In the 20th century, the fault caused the Cerknica Earthquake in 1926 and the Upper Soča Valley Earthquake in 1998 (both EMS VII–VIII).
