= Lavanttal Fault =

The Lavanttal Fault (or Pöls-Lavanttal Fault, Labot Fault; Slovene: Labotski prelom) is a seismically active fault that stretches from Austria in the north to Slovenia in the south. The fault strikes NNW-SSE and shows dextral strike-slip movements. In the southern part, the Lavanttal Fault displaces the Periadriatic Fault or Balaton Fault. Movements along the fault led to the formation of the Fohnsdorf Basin and the Lavanttal Basin.
