= Šoštanj =

- Town
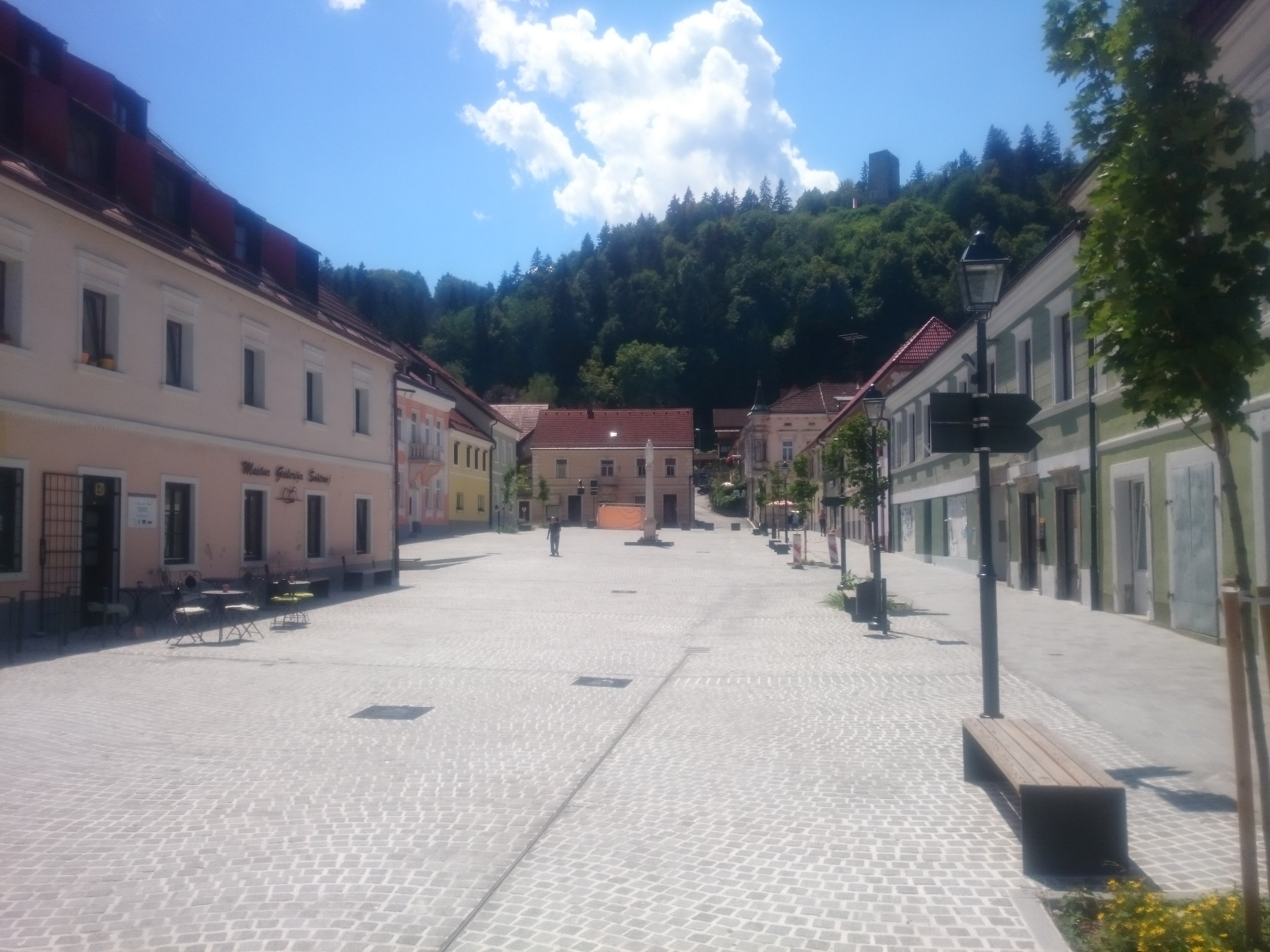
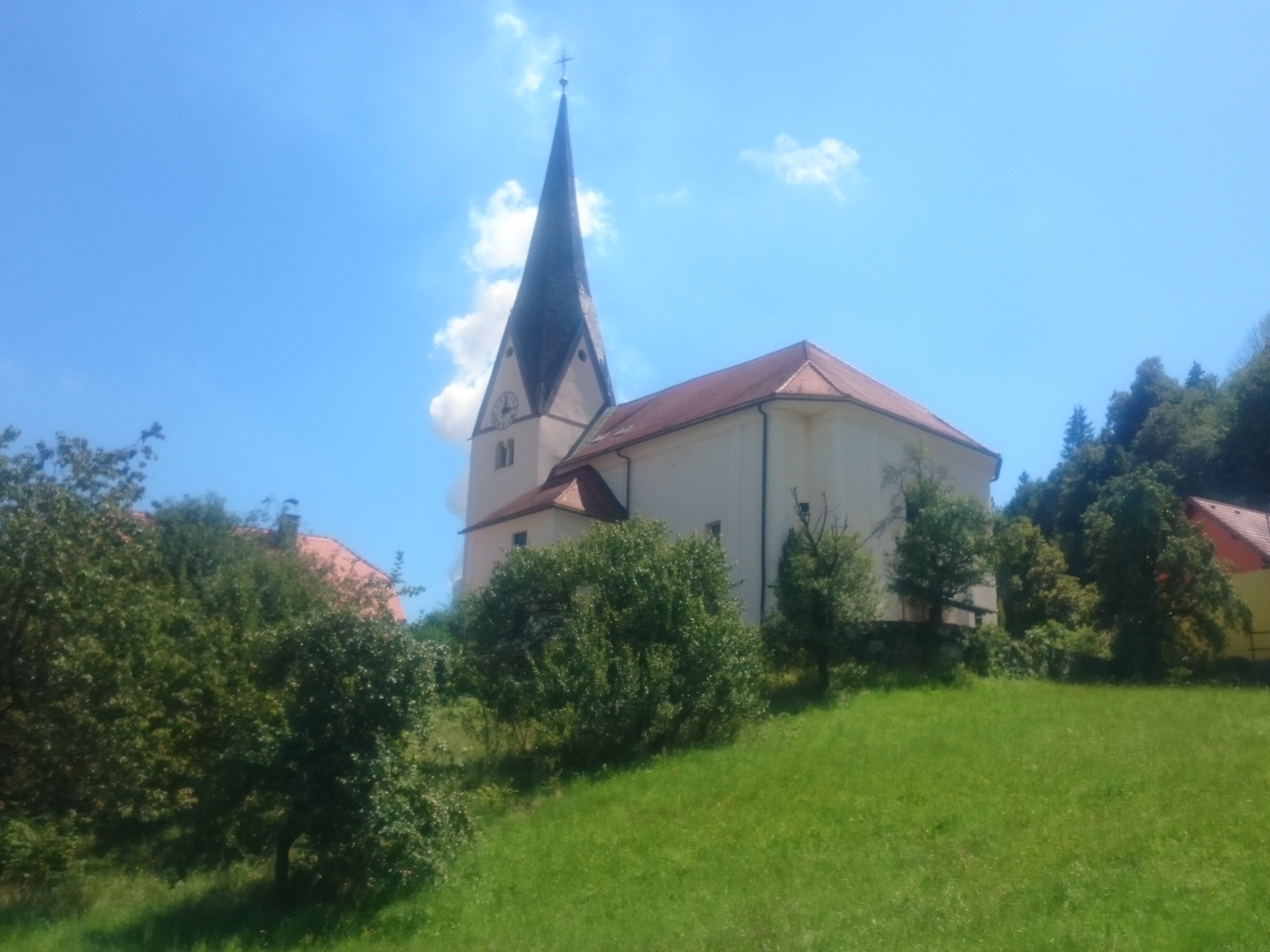
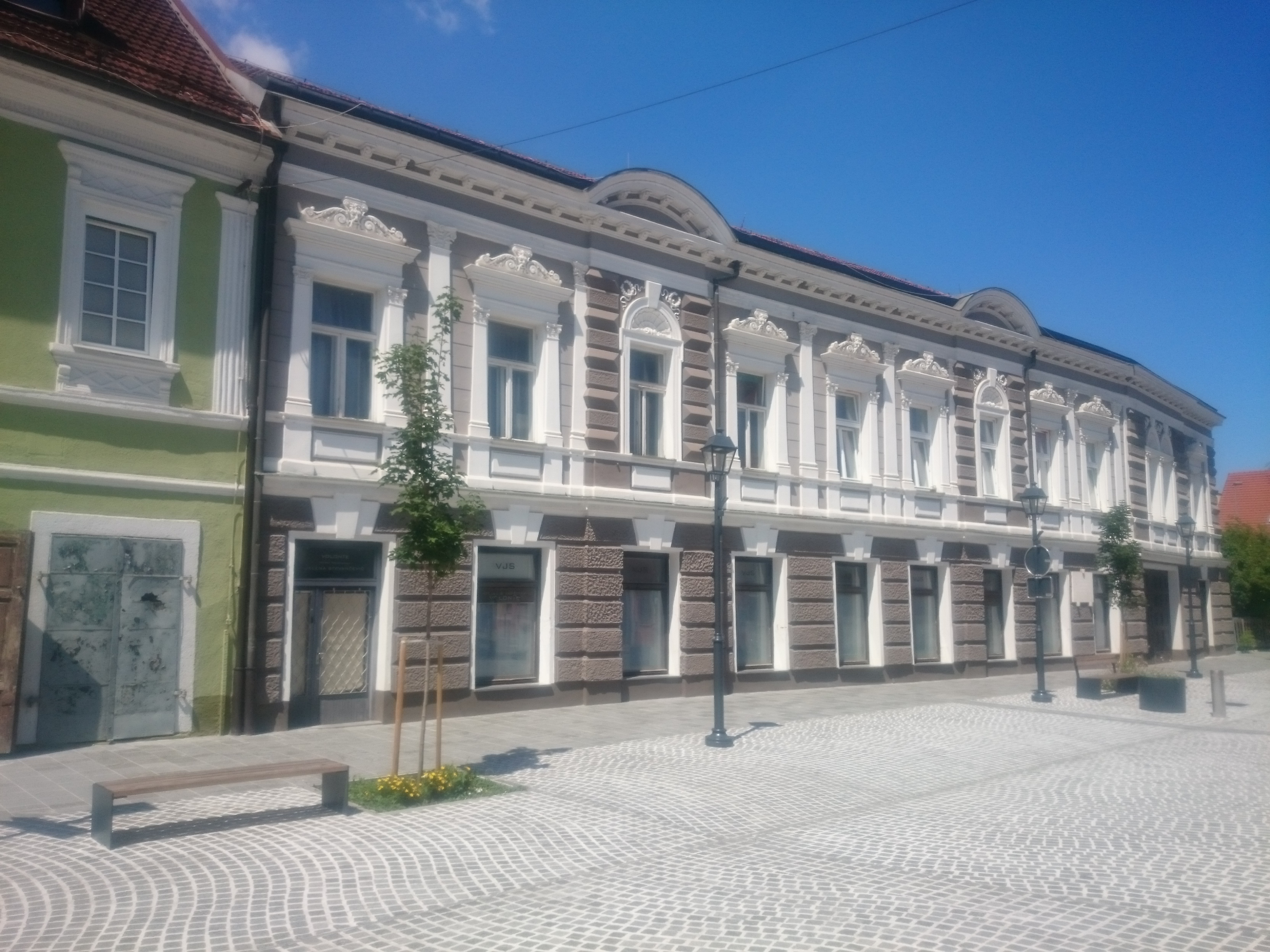
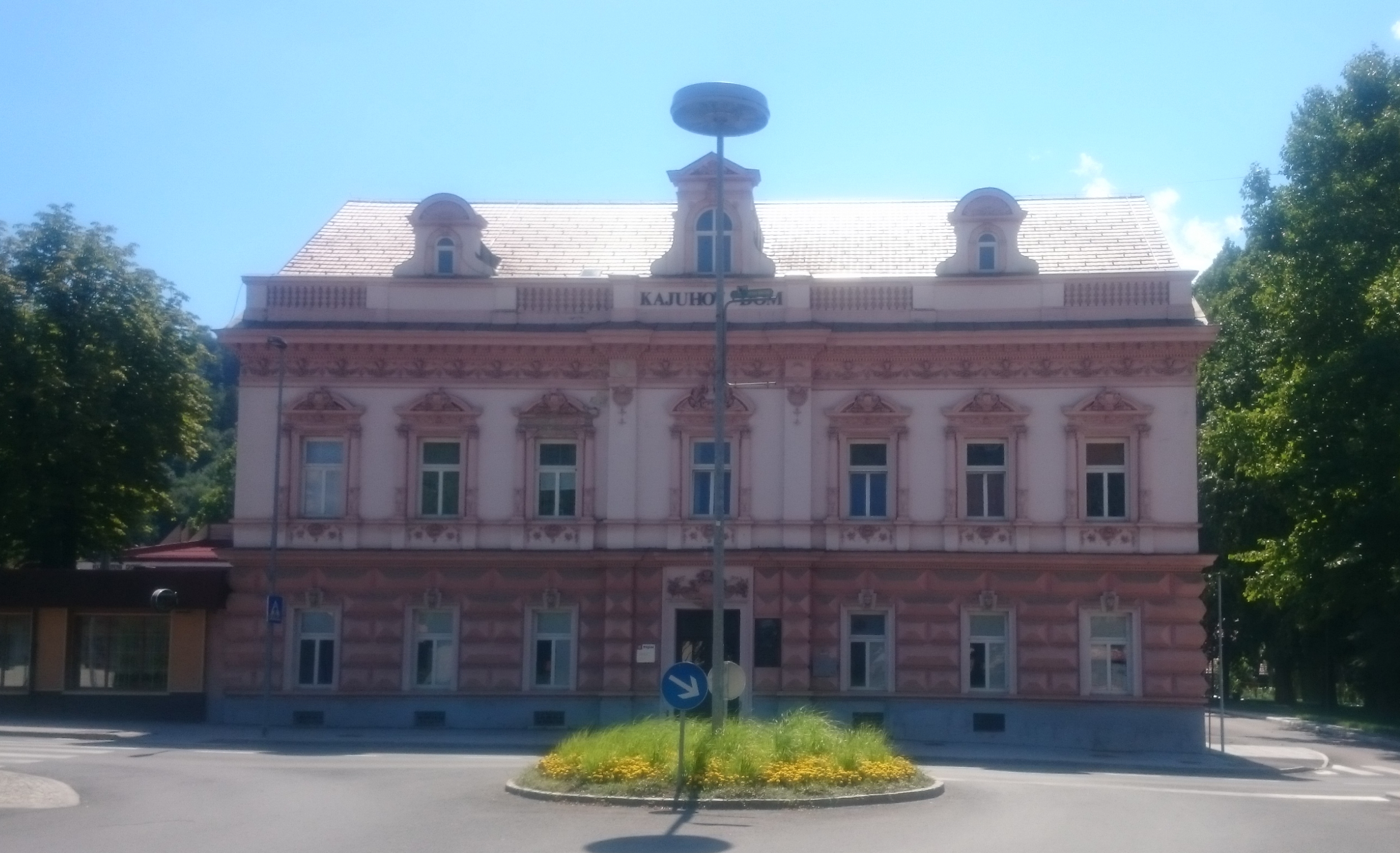
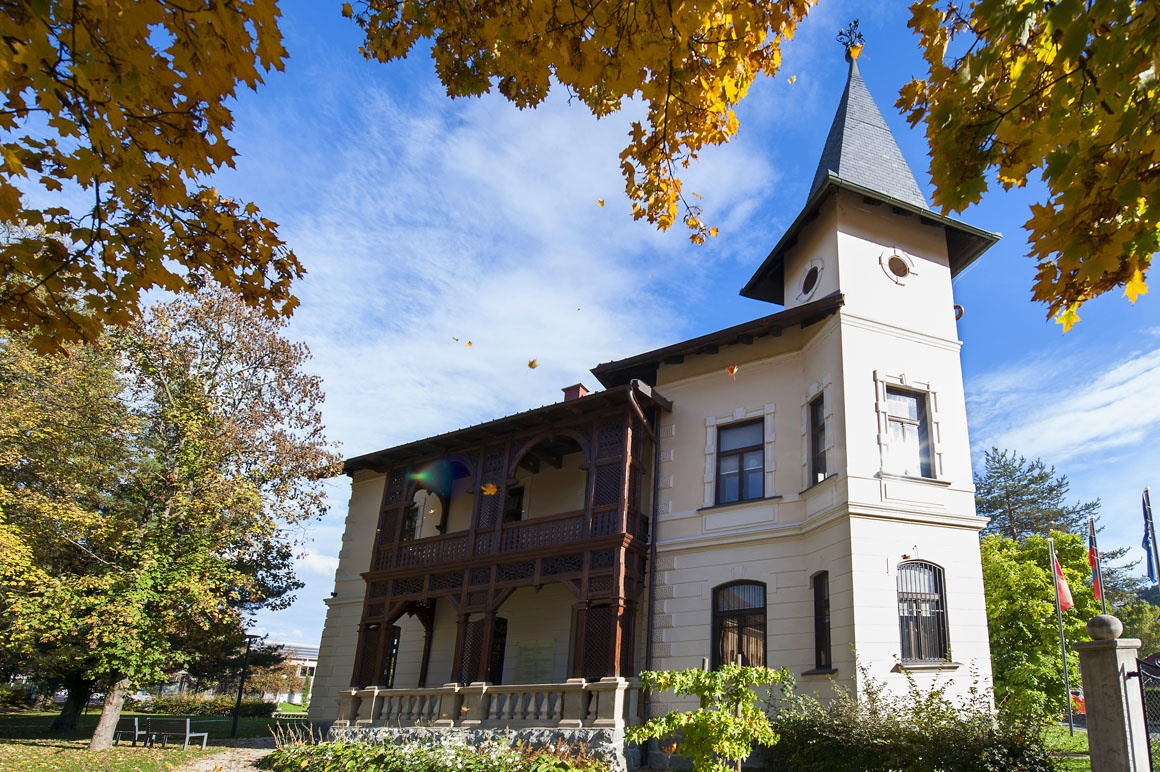
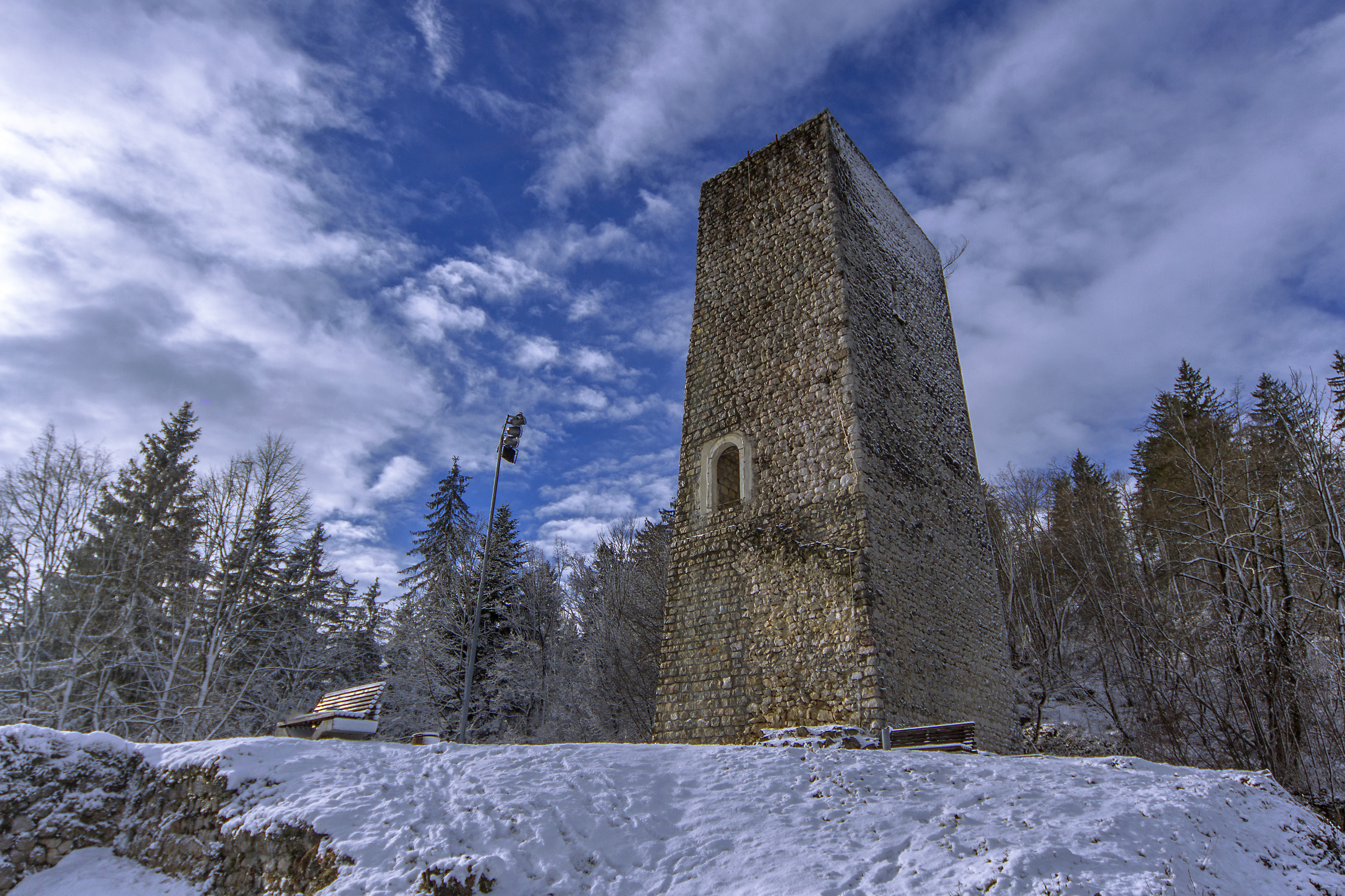
- From top, left to right: Mravljak Brothers Square, St. Hermagoras and Fortunatus Church, Vošnjak Factory, Kajuh Hall, Mayer Villa, Šoštanj Castle

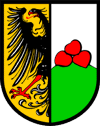
- Coat of arms

- Location in Slovenia
- Coordinates: 46°22′47.16″N 15°2′53.65″E
- Country: Slovenia
- Traditional region: Styria
- Statistical region: Savinja
- Municipality: Šoštanj

Area
  - Total: 3.7 km^{2} (1.4 sq mi)
- Elevation: 358.7 m (1,177 ft)

Population (2012)
  - Total: 2,933
- Climate: Cfb

Šoštanj (pronounced [ˈʃóːʃtan]; German: Schönstein) is a town in northern Slovenia. It is the seat of the Municipality of Šoštanj. The area is part of the traditional region of Styria. The entire municipality is now included in the Savinja Statistical Region.

== History ==
Šoštanj was first mentioned in written documents dating to around 1200 as Schönstein in relation to its castle. As a market town it was first mentioned in 1348. It was given town status in 1919 and until the 1960s was the center of the Šalek Valley (Slovene: Šaleška dolina). In 1963 nearby Velenje became the administrative center. Šoštanj again became a municipal center in the late 1990s. The town has a long leather-working history, with industrial-scale activity going back to 1788. The factory was owned by the Woschnagg family, a Germanized branch of the Vošnjak family, until it was nationalized in 1945. The processing factory was closed down in 1999. A leather industry museum is now open in the town.

=== Mass graves ===
Šoštanj is the site of four known mass graves and one clandestine grave from the period immediately after the Second World War. The Gorica 1–4 mass graves (Slovene: Grobišče Gorica 1–4) all lie north of Lake Šoštanj. The first grave is also known as the Čebul Meadow Mass Grave (Grobišče Čebulov travnik). The second grave is also known as the Stvarnik Meadow Mass Grave (Grobišče na Stvarnikovi njivi) or the Bodjan Meadow Mass Grave (Grobišče na Bodjanovi njivi). The four graves contain the remains of Slovene, Croatian, and German civilians that were murdered on the Gorica Ridge northeast of the town in late May 1945 as they were fleeing to Carinthia. The victims include a group of wealthy Šoštanj residents murdered on 23 May 1945. The graves are part of the same set as the Družmirje 1 and 2 mass graves. The Janez Pirmanšek Grave (Grob Janeza Pirmanška) lies in a meadow west of the town, at Primorska Cesta no. 7, above the sawmill and log storage area. A memorial to Šoštanj residents that fell while serving in the German army formerly stood at the site. The grave contained the remains of the Slovene civilian Janez Pirmanšek, who was liquidated on 20 May 1945.

== Power plant ==
The Šoštanj Power Plant began producing electricity in 1956. The plant is partly sponsored by the European Bank for Reconstruction and Development and the European Investment Bank, and is highly controversial.

=== Description ===
There are currently five units in the TEŠ (Termoelektrarna Šoštanj) power plant, which is owned by Holding Slovenske Elektrarne (HSE). Units 1 and 2 have closed down, and units 3, 4, and 5 were planned to be shut down around 2016. The TEŠ6 is the newest unit of the project, made to replace the old technology of the previous units. The newest edition is said to increase the power generated by 30%. This new unit will hold around 600 megawatts of electricity. The plant's operations will last for 40 years, 6650 hours annually, and will consume 440 metric tonnes of lignite per hour.

The TEŠ6 was proposed in 2003 and was included in the Slovenian government's agenda around 2007. The cost of TEŠ6 has climbed to around 1.5 billion euros due to the 50 million euro annual losses. The European Investment Bank (EIB) has given 550 million euros, the European Bank for Research and Development (EBRD) has given approximately 200 million euros, 515 million euros from the owner's capital, 83 million euros from HSE, and 80 million euros from a commercial loan.

Historical population
| Year | Pop. | ±% |
|---|---|---|
| 1948 | 2,174 | — |
| 1953 | 2,592 | +19.2% |
| 1961 | 3,148 | +21.5% |
| 1971 | 3,559 | +13.1% |
| 1981 | 3,210 | −9.8% |
| 1991 | 2,951 | −8.1% |
| 2002 | 2,793 | −5.4% |
| 2011 | 2,880 | +3.1% |
| 2021 | 2,927 | +1.6% |
Population size may be affected by changes in administrative divisions.

=== Protests and disagreements regarding the project ===
Organizations such as CEE Bankwatch are not content with the construction of the TEŠ6 and the way the project has been running. There are claims by the Slovenian media that there is evidence of corruption in the project regarding the involvement of Alstom, the main equipment contractor. Ten people were charged with destruction of business documentation and abuse of office and forgery; Alstom is said to have changed certain terms of its contract, thus causing the project's costs to increase. Alstom could have also gained information on competing companies and offers.

Environmentalists do not support the project due to the harmful effects that the project may lead to in terms of carbon emissions. Lignite emits carbon dioxide at a high rate, and is not an eco-friendly source of energy.

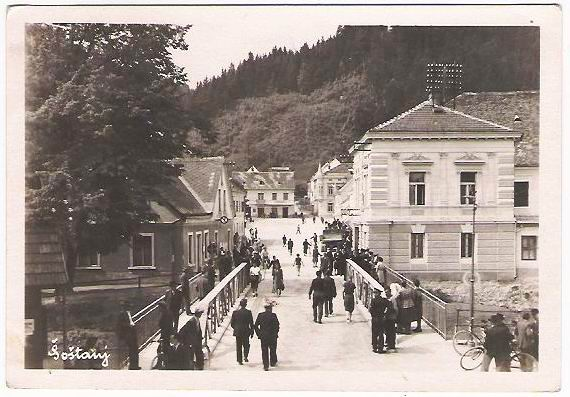
1955 postcard of Šoštanj

There is opposition regarding the construction of the plant because of future financial losses which Slovenia would incur. For a number of years, the plant could be responsible for 70 to 80 million euros in losses; considering the amount of loans towards the EIB, taxpayers in Slovenia would have to pay more money to support this project.

=== Operation and legal proceedings ===
Following years of delays, the new unit achieved operation in late 2014 at a cost of 1.4 billion euros.

Slovenian prosecutors filed charges of corruption and money laundering against two individuals and Alstom in 2020 in connection with TES 6.

In March 2021, General Electric (GE), which had purchased Alstom's energy unit in 2015, agreed to pay HES 261 million euros to settle claims brought by HES against GE.

== Church ==
The parish church in the town is dedicated to Michael the Archangel and belongs to the Roman Catholic Diocese of Celje. A second church in town was built in 1776 on the site of a 13th-century predecessor and is dedicated to Saints Hermagoras and Fortunatus.

== Notable residents ==
- Karel Destovnik, a.k.a. Kajuh (1922–1944), Partisan poet
- Jožef Kastelic (Castelliz) (1710–after 1773), religious writer
- Ivan Samonigg, Austrian officer and military education reformer (1839–1915)
- Mihael Valenci (1728–1813), technical writer and physician
- Josip Vošnjak (1834–1911), 19th-century national liberal leader
- Mihael Vošnjak (1837–1920), engineer and politician
