= Paka (river) =

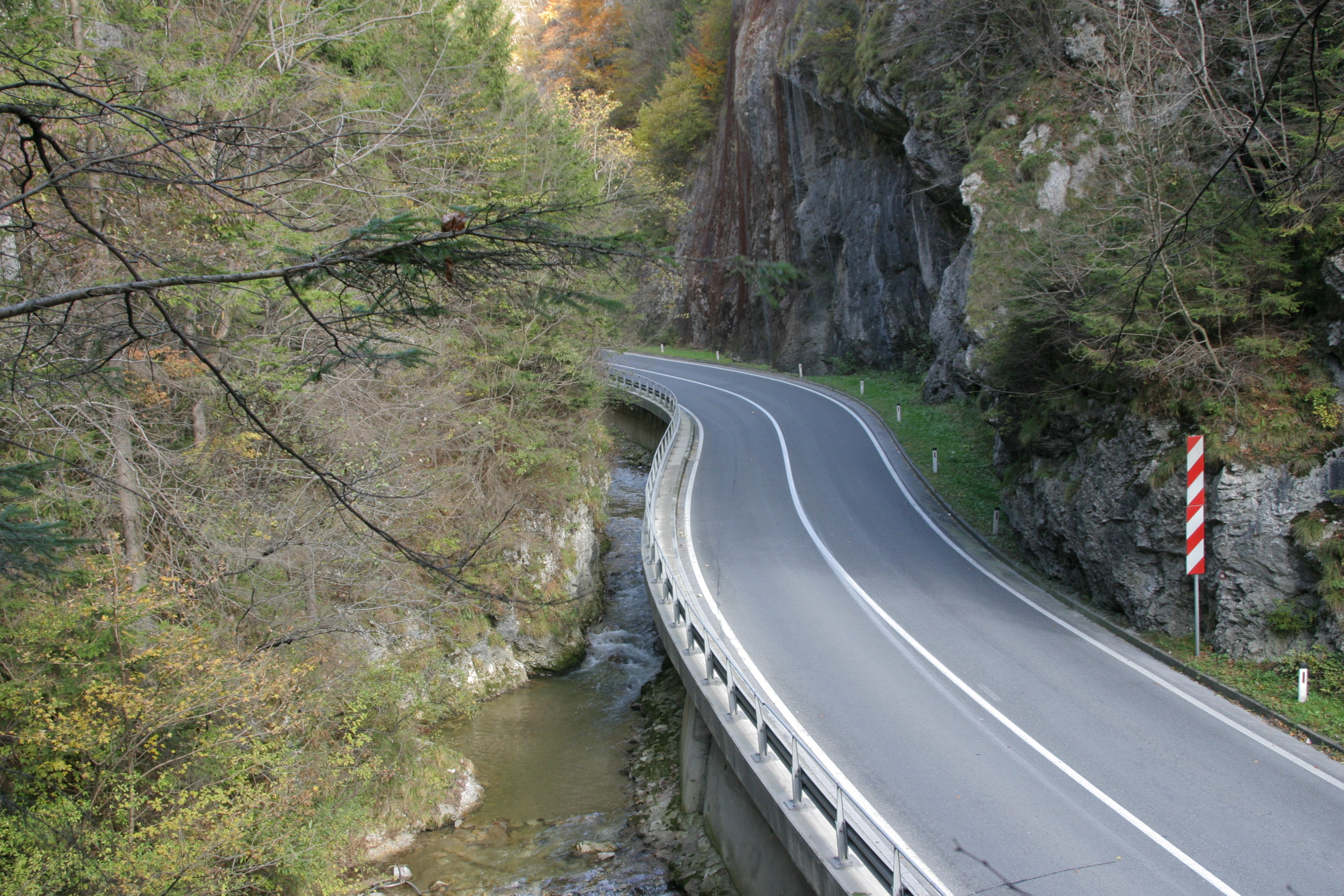
- The Paka in the Huda Luknja Gorge

Location
- Country: Slovenia

Physical characteristics
- Source
  - location: Rinka Falls
- Mouth
  - location: Savinja
  - coordinates: 46.3138°N 15.0425°E
- Length: 40 km (25 mi)
- Basin size: 210 km^{2} (81 sq mi)

Basin features
- Progression: Savinja→ Sava→ Danube→ Black Sea

The Paka is a 40 km (25 mi) long river in Slovenia. It flows through Velenje and it joins the Savinja as a left tributary.

== See also ==
- List of rivers of Slovenia
