= Savinja Statistical Region =

Statistical region in Slovenia

Coordinates: 46°15′00″N 15°10′00″E

Savinja Statistical Region savinjska statistična regija
- Statistical region
- Municipalities: 31
- Largest city: Celje

Area
  - Total: 2,384 km^{2} (920 sq mi)

Population (2020)
  - Total: 263,322
  - Density: 110.5/km^{2} (286.1/sq mi)

Statistics
  - Households: 102,482
  - Employed: 89,352
  - Registered unemployed: 16,583
  - College/university students: 10,441
  - Regional GDP (2019): EUR 5,393 bn (EUR 20,954 per capita)
- HDI (2022): 0.903 very high · 6th

The Savinja Statistical Region (Slovene: savinjska statistična regija) is a statistical region in Slovenia. The largest town in the region is Celje. It is named after the Savinja River. The region is very diverse in natural geography; it mainly comprises the wooded mountainous terrain attractive to tourists (the Upper Savinja Valley and part of the Kamnik–Savinja Alps), the fertile Lower Savinja Valley with good conditions for growing hops, the Kozje Hills, and the Velenje Basin with lignite deposits, used for electricity production. In 2013 the region invested more than EUR 127 million in environmental protection (the most of all regions). In 2013, the region accounted for 14% of enterprises created and 8% of enterprises shut down. The region has good natural conditions for agriculture. In 2013 this region had more than 11,000 farms, which is 15% of all farms in Slovenia, ranking the region right behind the Drava Statistical Region. In agricultural area utilised and livestock, the region was also in second place. The region is a well-known and popular tourist destination. In 2012, tourist arrivals and overnight stays in the region represented 11.1% of all tourist arrivals in Slovenia and 15.0% of all overnight stays. On average, tourists spent four nights there.

== Cities and towns ==
The Savinja Statistical Region includes 9 cities and towns, the largest of which is Celje.

Rank	Name	Population (2021)
1.	Celje	37,392
2.	Velenje	25,538
3.	Slovenske Konjice	5,155
4.	Rogaška Slatina	5,082
5.	Žalec	4,983
6.	Šentjur	4,927
7.	Laško	3,284
8.	Zreče	2,998
9.	Šoštanj	2,927

== Administrative divisions ==
The Savinja Statistical Region comprises the following 31 municipalities:

- Braslovče
- Celje
- Dobje
- Dobrna
- Gornji Grad
- Kozje
- Laško
- Ljubno
- Luče
- Mozirje
- Nazarje
- Podčetrtek
- Polzela
- Prebold
- Rečica ob Savinji
- Rogaška Slatina
- Rogatec
- Šentjur
- Slovenske Konjice
- Šmarje pri Jelšah
- Šmartno ob Paki
- Solčava
- Šoštanj
- Štore
- Tabor
- Velenje
- Vitanje
- Vojnik
- Vransko
- Žalec
- Zreče

The municipalities of Bistrica ob Sotli and the Radeče were part of the region until January 2015; they became part of the Lower Sava Statistical Region in 2015.

== Demographics ==
The population in 2020 was 263,322. It has a total area of 2,301 km².

== Economy ==
Employment structure: 51.8% services, 45.6% industry, 2.6% agriculture.

=== Tourism ===
It attracts 10.4% of the total number of tourists in Slovenia, most being from Slovenia (52.8%).

== Transportation ==
- Length of motorways: 64.8 km
- Length of other roads: 5754.3 km

== Sources ==
- Slovenian regions in figures 2014
