= Špital =

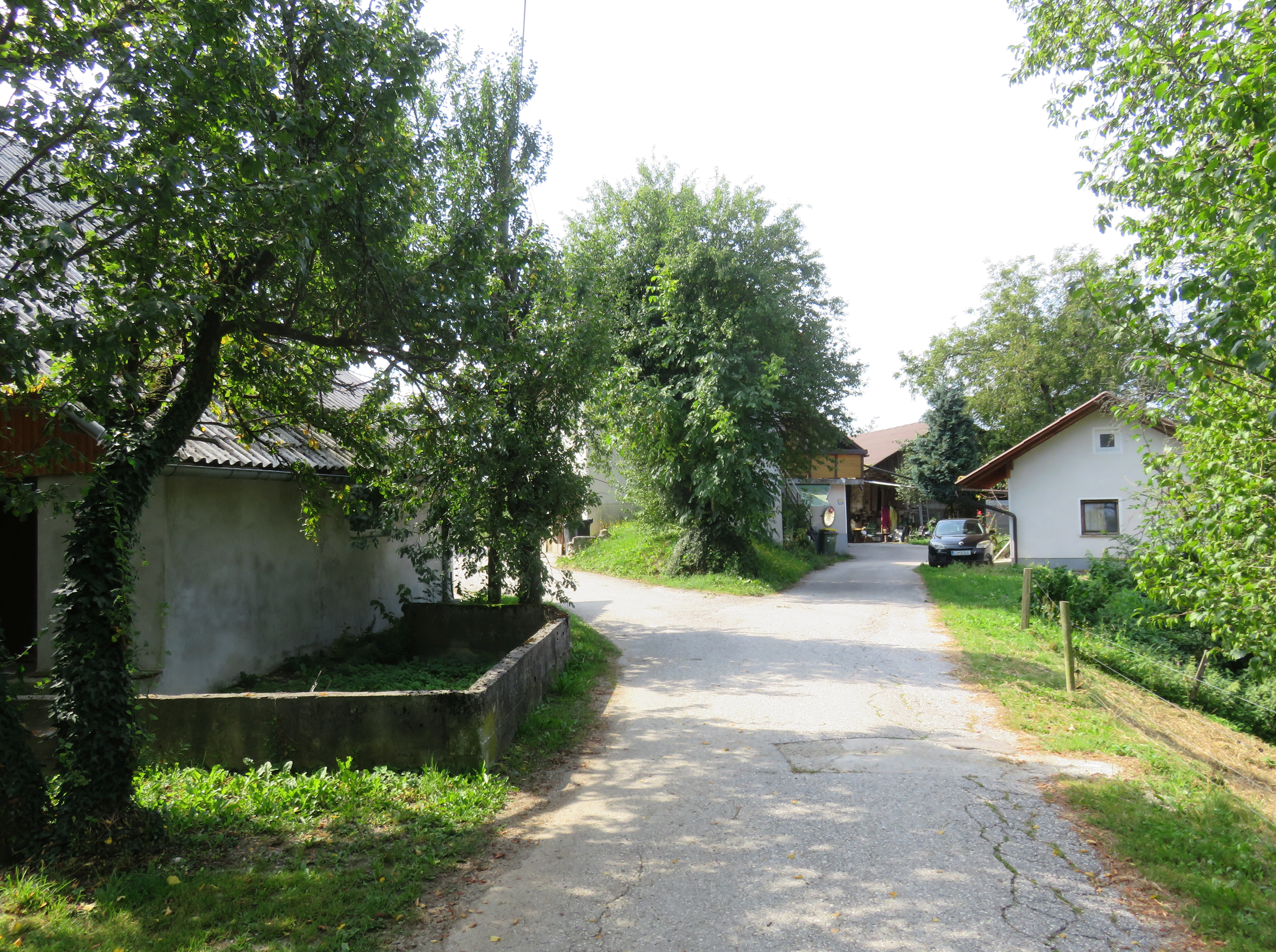

- Location in Slovenia
- Coordinates: 46°6′12.96″N 14°56′43.35″E
- Country: Slovenia
- Traditional region: Styria
- Statistical region: Central Sava
- Municipality: Zagorje ob Savi

Area
  - Total: 0.8 km^{2} (0.31 sq mi)
- Elevation: 712 m (2,336 ft)

Population (2015)
  - Total: 25
- Postal code: 1410 Zagorje ob Savi

Špital (pronounced [ʃpiˈtaːl]) is a settlement in the hills west of Zagorje ob Savi in central Slovenia. The area is part of the traditional region of Styria. It is now included with the rest of the Municipality of Zagorje ob Savi in the Central Sava Statistical Region.

== History ==
Špital became an independent settlement in 2000, when its territory was separated from Požarje and Mošenik.
