= Hrastnik (disambiguation) =

Hrastnik is a town in Zasavje, Slovenia.

Hrastnik may also refer to the following settlements:

- Hrastnik, Moravče, village in the municipaity of Moravče, Slovenia
- Hrastnik, Vojnik, village in the municipaity of Vojnik, Slovenia
- Hrastnik pri Trojanah, village in the municipaity of Trojane, Slovenia
