= Družina, Zagorje ob Savi =

Družina
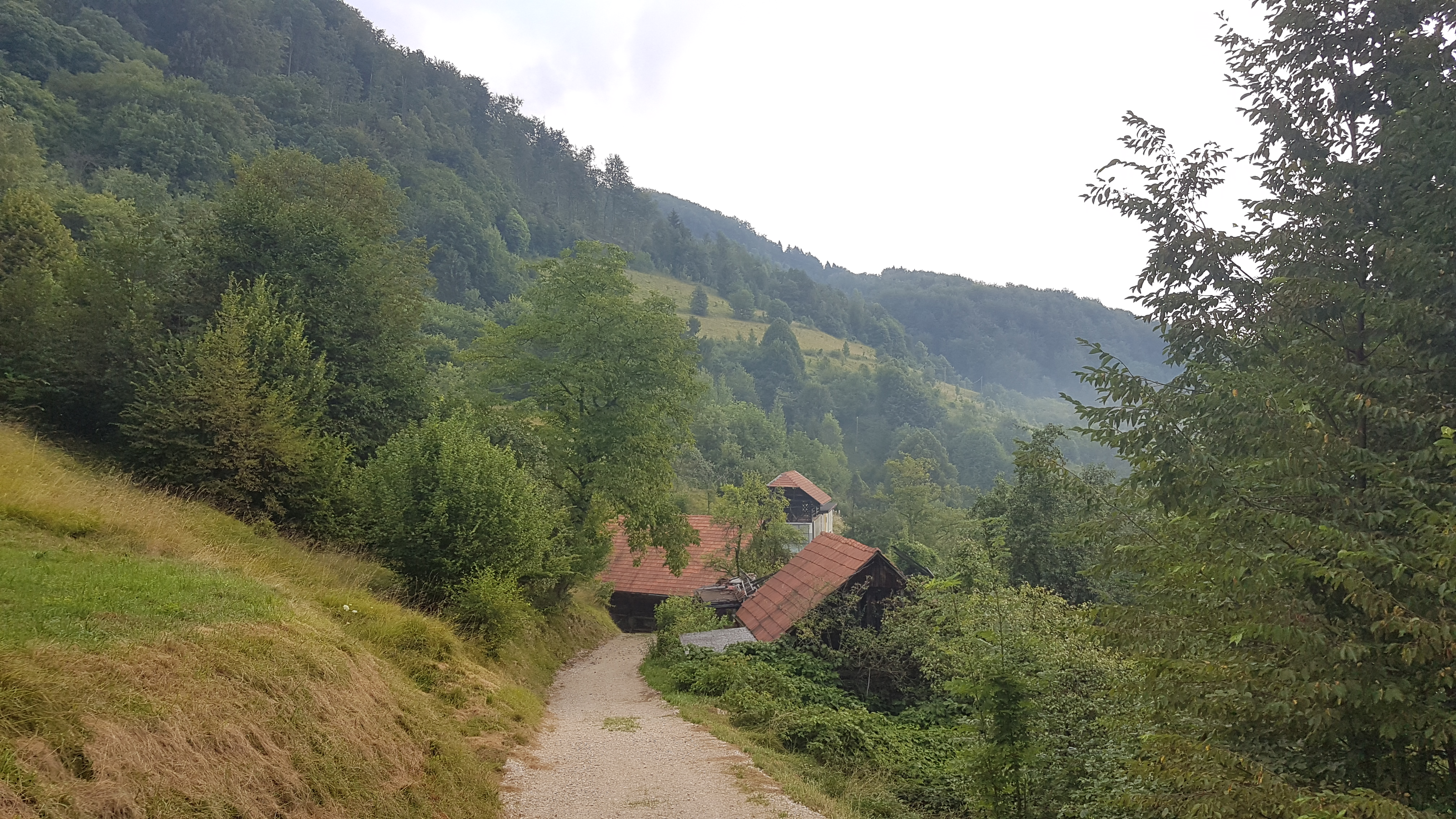

- Location in Slovenia
- Coordinates: 46°7′13.71″N 14°58′56.18″E
- Country: Slovenia
- Traditional region: Upper Carniola
- Statistical region: Central Sava
- Municipality: Zagorje ob Savi

Area
  - Total: 1.03 km^{2} (0.40 sq mi)
- Elevation: 448.4 m (1,471 ft)

Population (2002)
  - Total: 7
- Postal code: 1410

Družina (pronounced [dɾuˈʒiːna]) is a small dispersed settlement in the hills above the left bank of the Sava River in the Municipality of Zagorje ob Savi in central Slovenia. It is accessible by road from Dolenja Vas. The area is part of the traditional region of Upper Carniola. It is now included with the rest of the municipality in the Central Sava Statistical Region.
