= Vrhe =

Vrhe may refer to any of the following settlements in Slovenia:

- Vrhe, Celje
- Vrhe, Novo Mesto
- Vrhe, Slovenj Gradec
- Vrhe, Zagorje ob Savi
- Vrhe, Trbovlje
