= Strahovlje =

Settlement in Upper Carniola, Slovenia

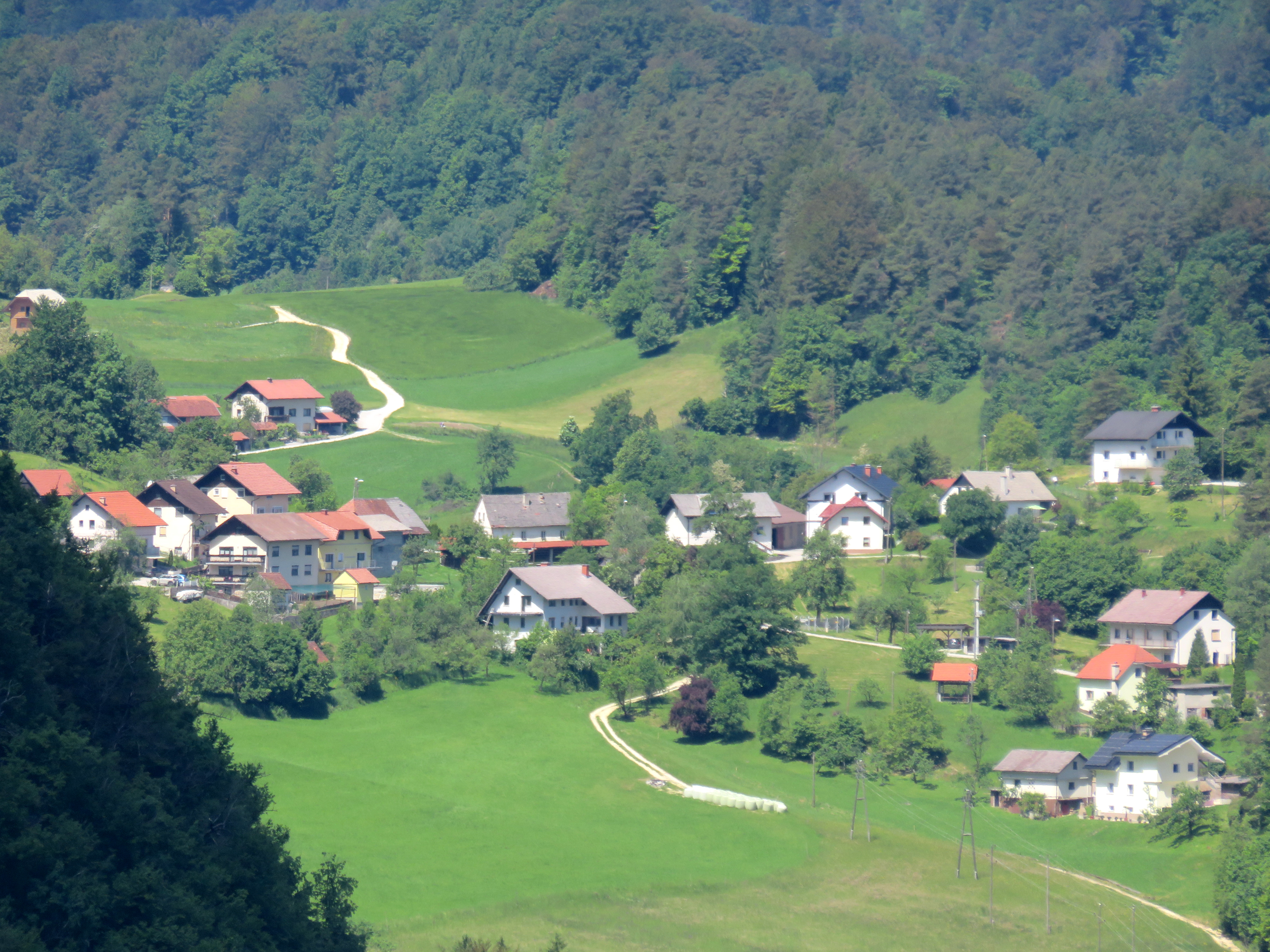

- Location in Slovenia
- Coordinates: 46°8′27.21″N 14°56′40.19″E
- Country: Slovenia
- Traditional region: Upper Carniola
- Statistical region: Central Sava
- Municipality: Zagorje ob Savi

Area
  - Total: 1.6 km^{2} (0.62 sq mi)

Population (2013)
  - Total: 70
  - Density: 44/km^{2} (110/sq mi)

Strahovlje (pronounced [stɾaˈxoːu̯ljɛ]) is a small settlement in the Municipality of Zagorje ob Savi in central Slovenia. The settlement is part of the traditional region of the Upper Carniola and is included in the Central Sava Statistical Region.

== History ==
Strahovlje was part of Šemnik until 2008, when it was separated from it and made a separate village.
