= Municipality of Zagorje ob Savi =

Municipality of Slovenia

Municipality of Zagorje ob Savi Občina Zagorje ob Savi
- Municipality
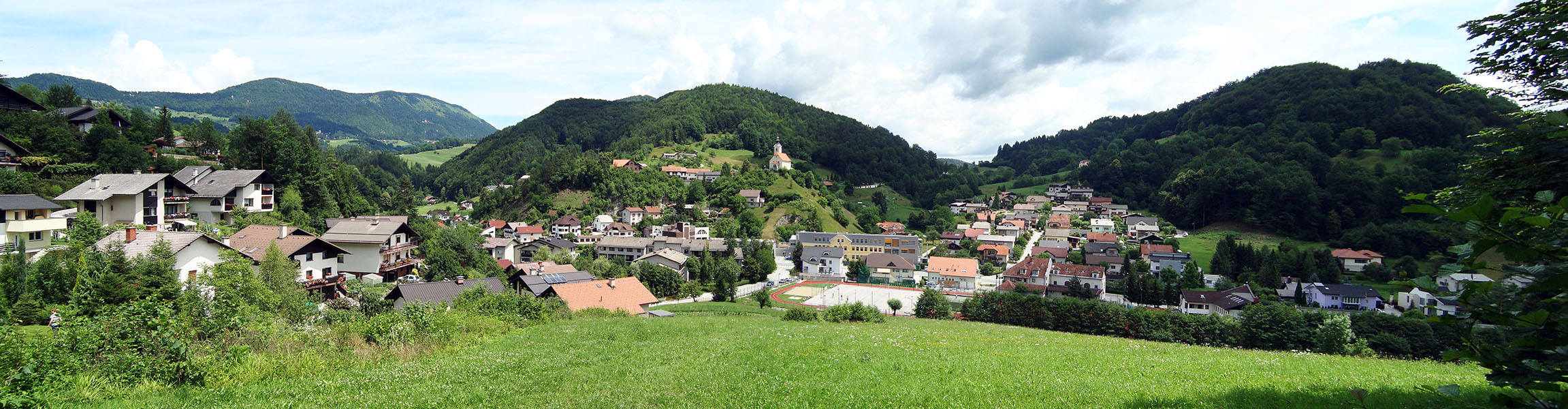

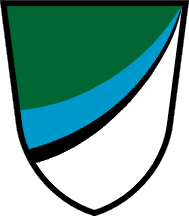
- Coat of arms

- Location of the Municipality of Zagorje ob Savi in Slovenia
- Coordinates: 46°08′N 15°0′E
- Country: Slovenia

Government
  - Mayor: Matjaž Švagan

Area
  - Total: 147.1 km^{2} (56.8 sq mi)

Population (2002)
  - Total: 17,067
  - Density: 116.0/km^{2} (300.5/sq mi)
- Time zone: UTC+01 (CET)
  - Summer (DST): UTC+02 (CEST)
- Website: www.zagorje.si
- Source: Statistical Office of the Republic of Slovenia, census of 2002

The Municipality of Zagorje ob Savi (pronounced [zaˈɡoːɾjɛ ɔp ˈsaːʋi]; Slovene: Občina Zagorje ob Savi) is a municipality in central Slovenia. The seat of the municipality is the town of Zagorje ob Savi. The area is part of the traditional region of Upper Carniola. The entire municipality is now included in the Central Sava Statistical Region. The population of the municipality is about 17,000.

Archaeological evidence shows that the area was already settled in the Late Bronze Age and Iron Age.

== Settlements ==
In addition to the municipal seat of Zagorje ob Savi, the municipality also includes the following settlements:

- Blodnik
- Borje
- Borje pri Mlinšah
- Borovak pri Podkumu
- Brezje
- Breznik
- Briše
- Čemšenik
- Čolnišče
- Dobrljevo
- Dolenja Vas
- Dolgo Brdo pri Mlinšah
- Družina
- Golče
- Gorenja Vas
- Hrastnik pri Trojanah
- Izlake
- Jablana
- Jarše
- Jelenk
- Jelševica
- Jesenovo
- Kal
- Kandrše
- Kisovec
- Kolk
- Kolovrat
- Konjšica
- Kostrevnica
- Kotredež
- Log pri Mlinšah
- Loke pri Zagorju
- Mali Kum
- Medija
- Mlinše
- Mošenik
- Orehovica
- Osredek
- Padež
- Podkraj pri Zagorju
- Podkum
- Podlipovica
- Polšina
- Potoška Vas
- Požarje
- Prapreče
- Ravenska Vas
- Ravne pri Mlinšah
- Razbor pri Čemšeniku
- Razpotje
- Rodež
- Rove
- Rovišče
- Rtiče
- Ržiše
- Selo pri Zagorju
- Šemnik
- Senožeti
- Šentgotard
- Šentlambert
- Šklendrovec
- Sopota
- Špital
- Spodnji Šemnik
- Strahovlje
- Tirna
- Vidrga
- Vine
- Vrh
- Vrh pri Mlinšah
- Vrhe
- Zabava
- Zabreznik
- Zavine
- Zgornji Prhovec
- Znojile
- Žvarulje
