= Ržiše =

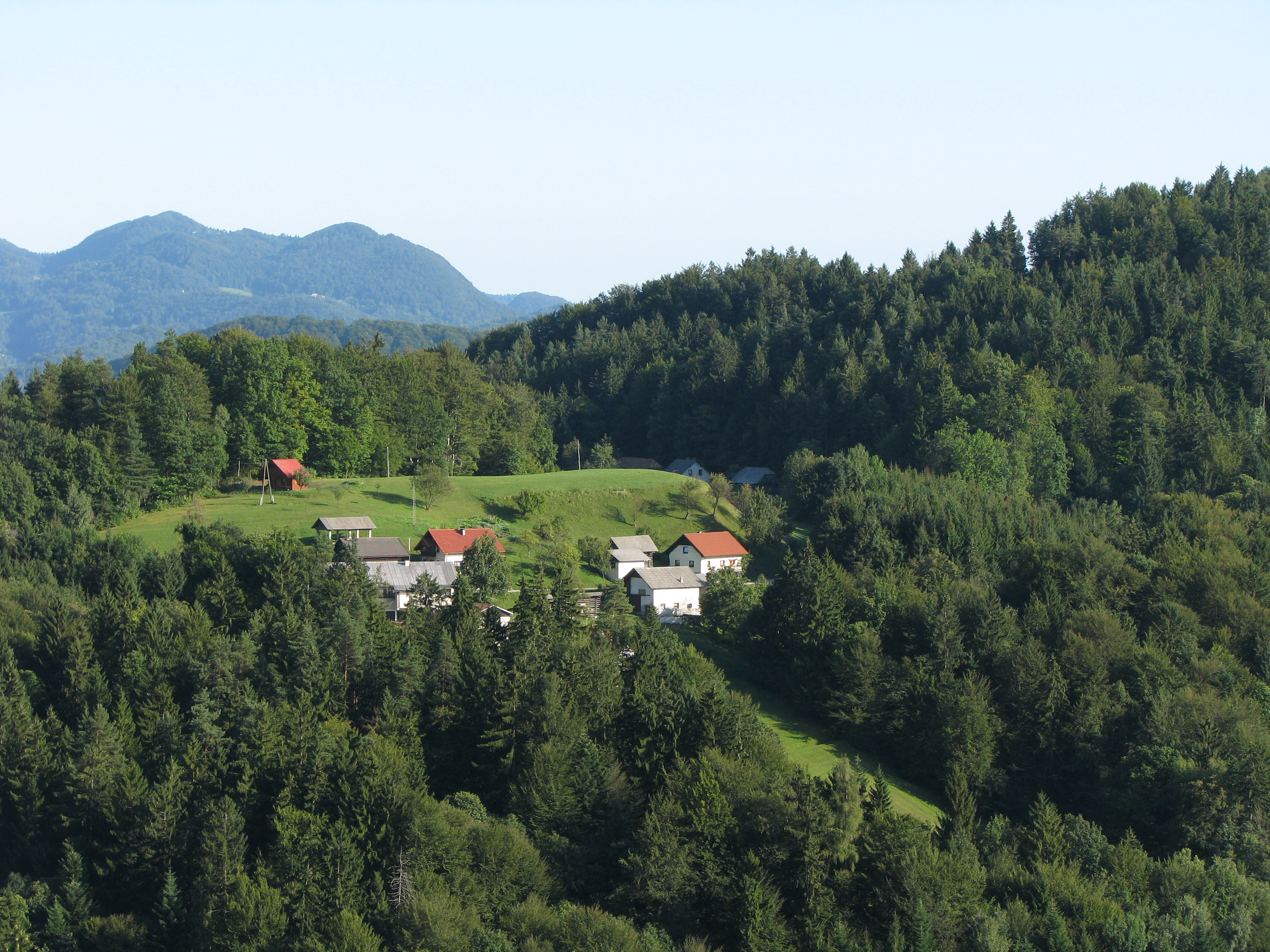

- Location in Slovenia
- Coordinates: 46°9′58.88″N 14°57′36.88″E
- Country: Slovenia
- Traditional region: Lower Carniola
- Statistical region: Central Sava
- Municipality: Zagorje ob Savi

Area
  - Total: 1.88 km^{2} (0.73 sq mi)
- Elevation: 562.5 m (1,845 ft)

Population (2002)
  - Total: 99
- Postal code: 1413

Ržiše (pronounced [əɾˈʒiːʃɛ]; in older sources also Režišče, German: Arschische) is a settlement in the hills northeast of Izlake in the Municipality of Zagorje ob Savi in central Slovenia. The area is part of the traditional region of Lower Carniola. It is now included with the rest of the municipality in the Central Sava Statistical Region. It includes the hamlet of Gamberk (German: Gallenberg).
