= Jesenovo =

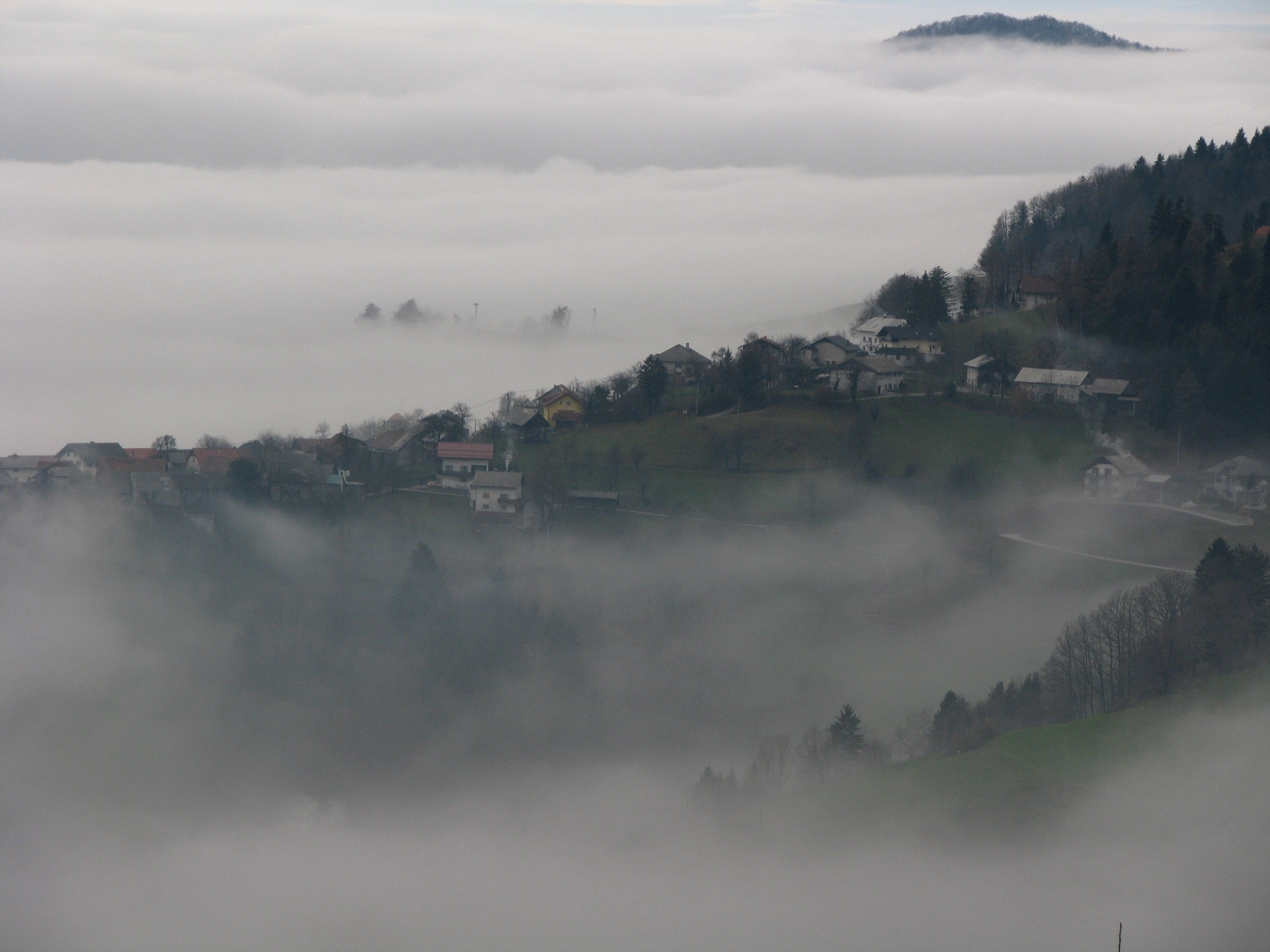

- Location in Slovenia
- Coordinates: 46°10′52.34″N 14°58′10.89″E
- Country: Slovenia
- Traditional region: Upper Carniola
- Statistical region: Central Sava
- Municipality: Zagorje ob Savi

Area
  - Total: 4 km^{2} (1.5 sq mi)
- Elevation: 627.9 m (2,060 ft)

Population (2002)
  - Total: 284
- Postal code: 1413

Jesenovo (pronounced [jɛsɛˈnɔːʋɔ] or [jɛsɛˈnoːʋɔ]) is a settlement north of Zagorje ob Savi in central Slovenia. The area is part of the traditional region of Upper Carniola. It is now included with the rest of the Municipality of Zagorje ob Savi in the Central Sava Statistical Region.
