= Blodnik =

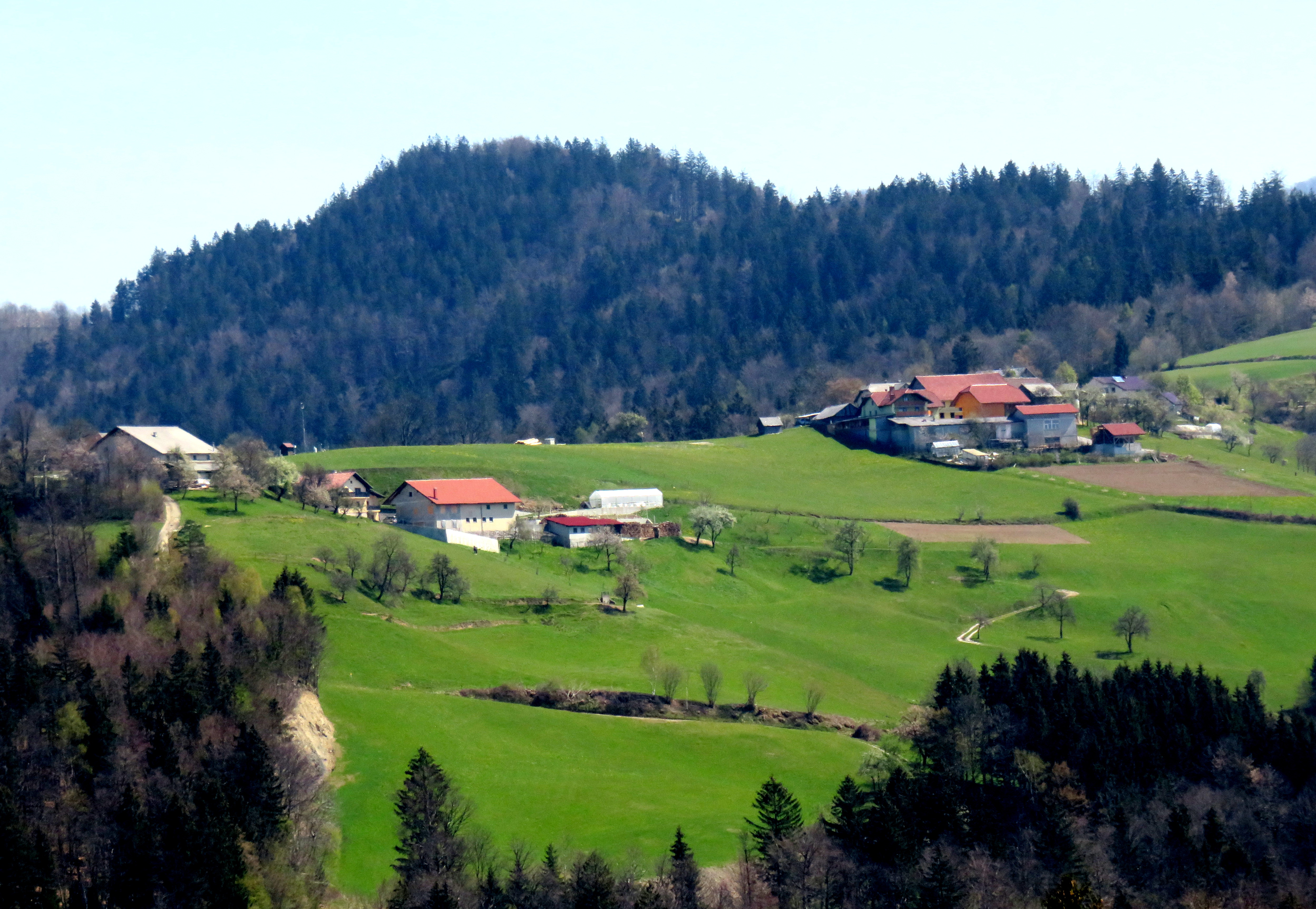

- Location in Slovenia
- Coordinates: 46°11′30.13″N 14°54′45.65″E
- Country: Slovenia
- Traditional region: Upper Carniola
- Statistical region: Central Sava
- Municipality: Zagorje ob Savi

Area
  - Total: 0.91 km^{2} (0.35 sq mi)
- Elevation: 636.7 m (2,089 ft)

Population (2002)
  - Total: 25
- Postal code: 1222

Blodnik (pronounced [ˈbloːdnik]) is a small dispersed settlement east of Trojane in central Slovenia. It lies within the Municipality of Zagorje ob Savi. The area is part of the traditional region of Upper Carniola. It is now included with the rest of the municipality in the Central Sava Statistical Region.

== Name ==
Blodnik was attested in written sources as Vbludnizi in 1571.
