= Šklendrovec =

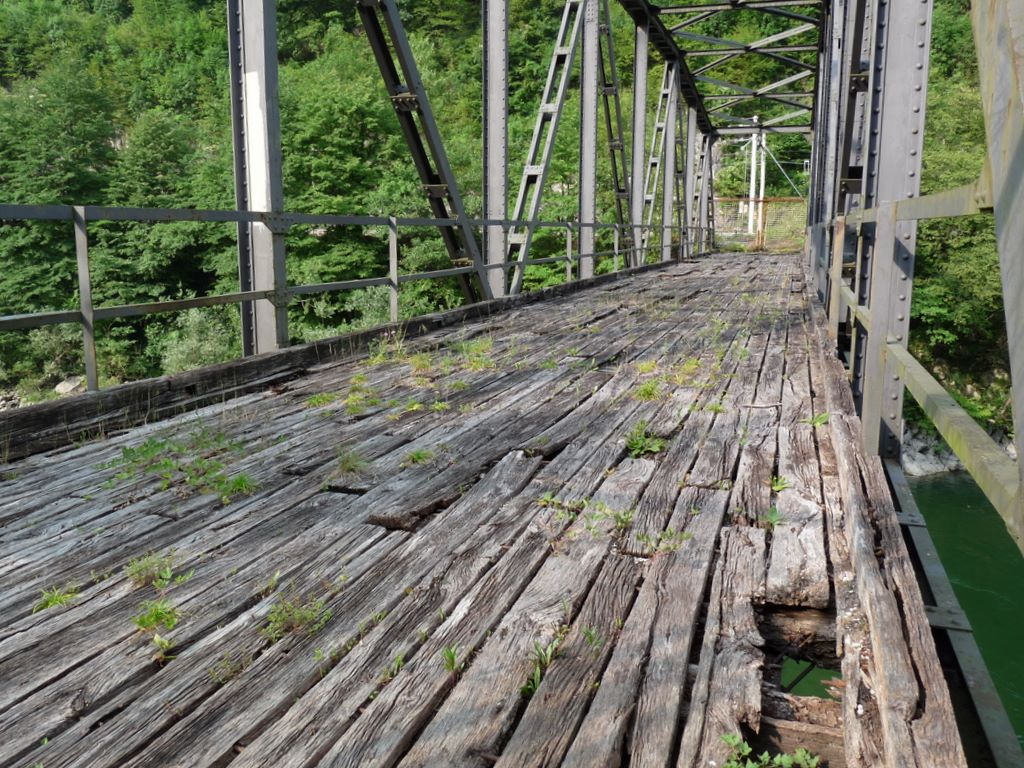

- Location in Slovenia
- Coordinates: 46°7′7.88″N 14°59′30.65″E
- Country: Slovenia
- Traditional region: Lower Carniola
- Statistical region: Central Sava
- Municipality: Zagorje ob Savi

Area
  - Total: 2.89 km^{2} (1.12 sq mi)
- Elevation: 228 m (748 ft)

Population (2002)
  - Total: 160
- Postal code: 1410

Šklendrovec (pronounced [ˈʃkleːndɾɔʋəts]) is a settlement in the Municipality of Zagorje ob Savi in central Slovenia. It lies on the right bank of the Sava River and extends southeastwards into the hills towards Podkum. The area is part of the traditional region of Lower Carniola. It is now included with the rest of the municipality in the Central Sava Statistical Region.
