= Padež, Zagorje ob Savi =

Padež
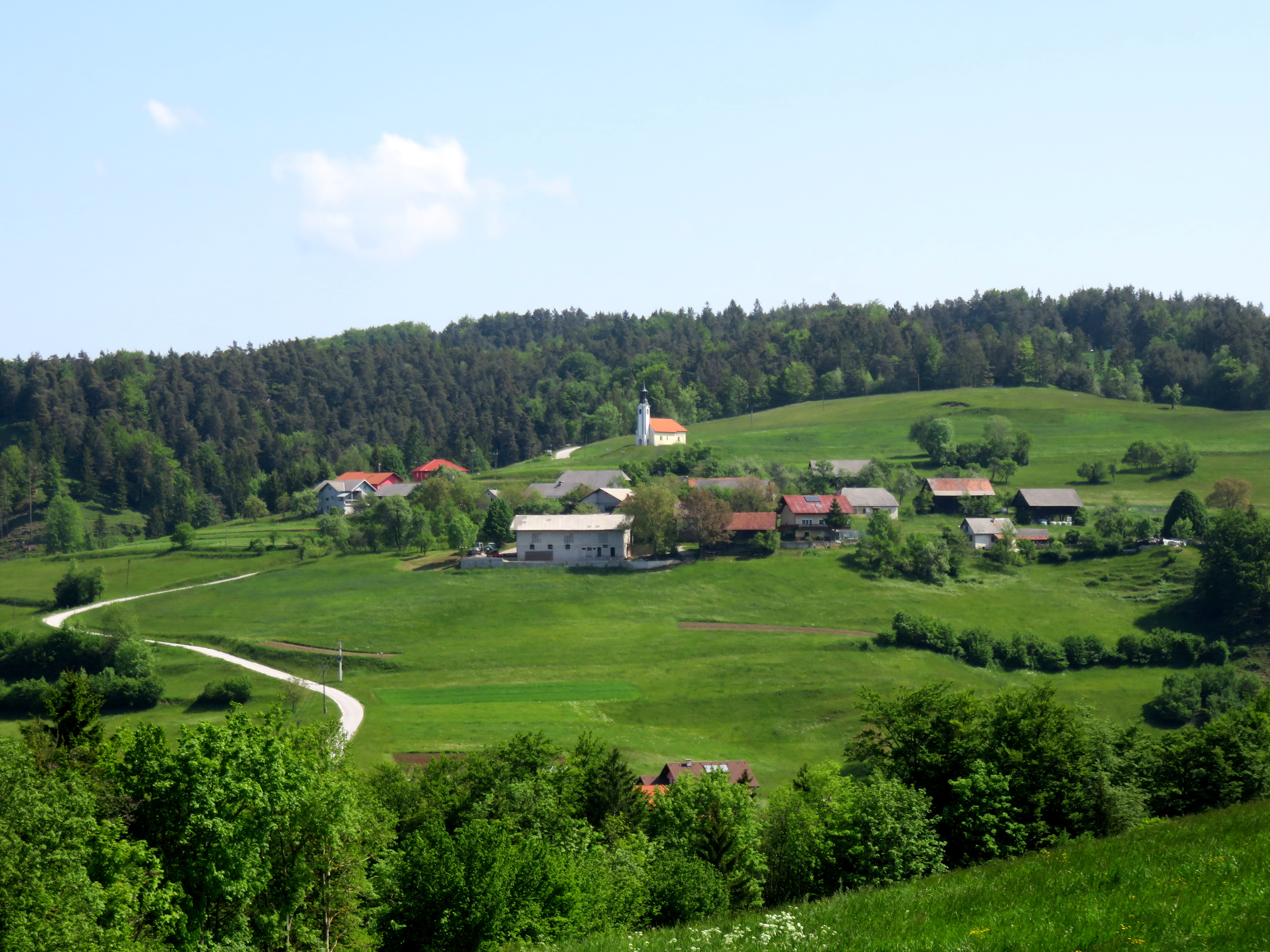

- Location in Slovenia
- Coordinates: 46°3′41.54″N 15°0′36.75″E
- Country: Slovenia
- Traditional region: Lower Carniola
- Statistical region: Central Sava
- Municipality: Zagorje ob Savi

Area
  - Total: 1.19 km^{2} (0.46 sq mi)
- Elevation: 747.8 m (2,453 ft)

Population (2002)
  - Total: 30
- Postal code: 1414

Padež (pronounced [ˈpaːdɛʃ]) is a village in the Municipality of Zagorje ob Savi in central Slovenia. The area is part of the traditional region of Lower Carniola. It is now included with the rest of the municipality in the Central Sava Statistical Region.

The local church is dedicated to Saint James (Slovene: sveti Jakob) and belongs to the Parish of Šentjurij–Podkum. It is a Gothic building with various later modifications.
