= Log pri Mlinšah =

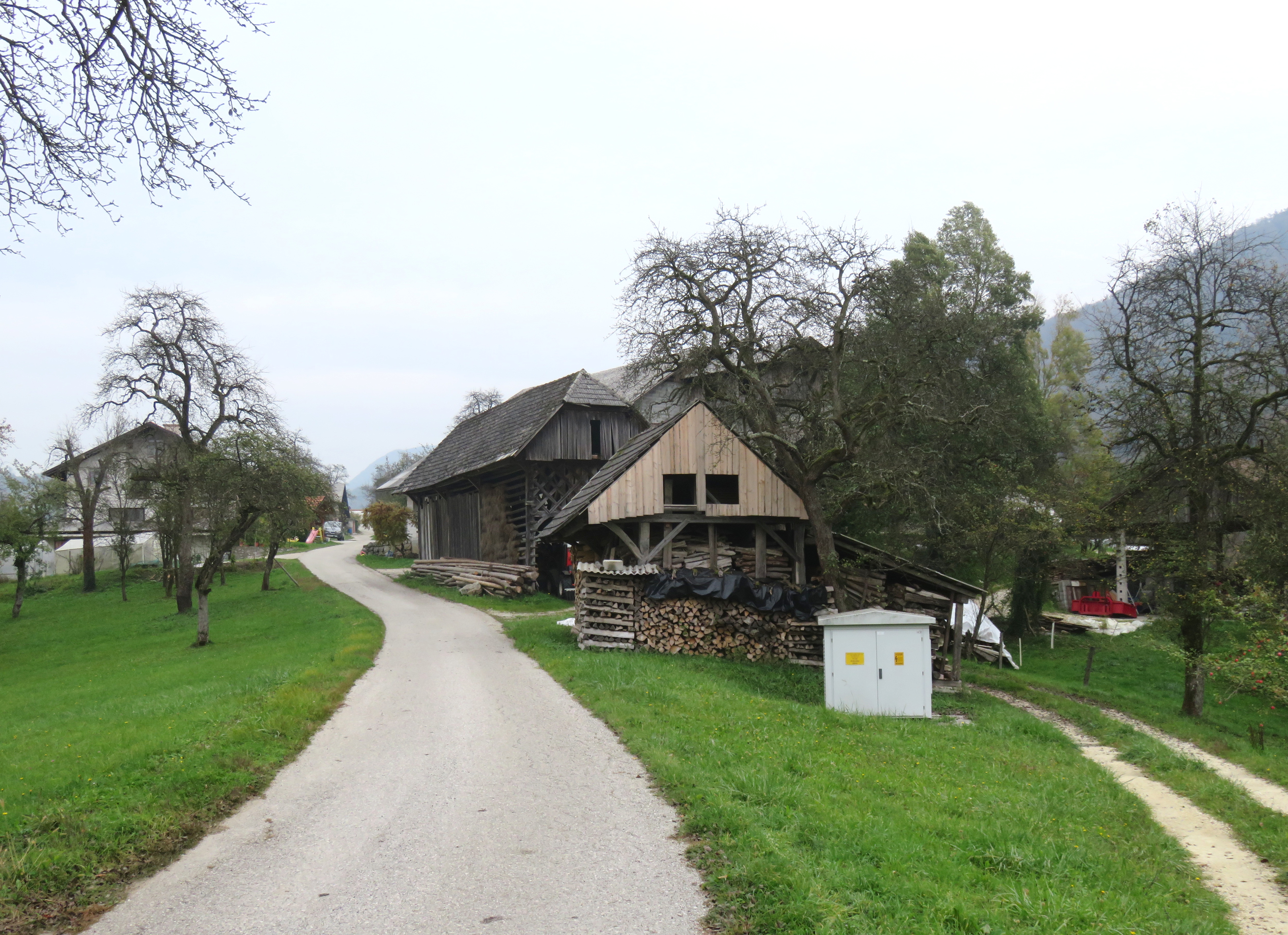

- Location in Slovenia
- Coordinates: 46°8′9.16″N 14°52′6.15″E
- Country: Slovenia
- Traditional region: Upper Carniola
- Statistical region: Central Sava
- Municipality: Zagorje ob Savi

Area
  - Total: 0.81 km^{2} (0.31 sq mi)
- Elevation: 457.3 m (1,500 ft)

Population (2002)
  - Total: 51
- Postal code: 1411

Log pri Mlinšah (pronounced [ˈloːk pri ˈmliːnʃax]) is a settlement southwest of Izlake in the Municipality of Zagorje ob Savi in central Slovenia. The area is part of the traditional region of Upper Carniola. It is now included with the rest of the municipality in the Central Sava Statistical Region.

== Name ==
The name of the settlement was changed from Log to Log pri Mlinšah in 1955.
