= Gorenja Vas, Zagorje ob Savi =

Gorenja Vas
- Location in Slovenia
- Coordinates: 46°5′12.86″N 15°2′30.82″E
- Country: Slovenia
- Traditional region: Lower Carniola
- Statistical region: Central Sava
- Municipality: Zagorje ob Savi

Area
  - Total: 3.19 km^{2} (1.23 sq mi)
- Elevation: 654.7 m (2,148 ft)

Population (2002)
  - Total: 76
- Postal code: 1414

Gorenja Vas (pronounced [ɡɔˈɾeːnja ˈʋaːs]; Slovene: Gorenja vas, German: Oberdorf) is a dispersed settlement north of Podkum in the Municipality of Zagorje ob Savi in central Slovenia. The area is part of the traditional region of Lower Carniola. It is now included with the rest of the municipality in the Central Sava Statistical Region.
