= Jelenk =

- Location in Slovenia
- Coordinates: 46°7′18.47″N 14°55′7″E
- Country: Slovenia
- Traditional region: Upper Carniola
- Statistical region: Central Sava
- Municipality: Zagorje ob Savi

Area
  - Total: 1.22 km^{2} (0.47 sq mi)
- Elevation: 700.9 m (2,300 ft)

Population (2002)
  - Total: 36
- Postal code: 1410

Jelenk (pronounced [jɛˈleːŋk]) is a settlement in the hills east of Trojane in central Slovenia. It is part of the Municipality of Zagorje ob Savi. The area is part of the traditional region of Upper Carniola. It is now included with the rest of the municipality in the Central Sava Statistical Region.
