= Golče =

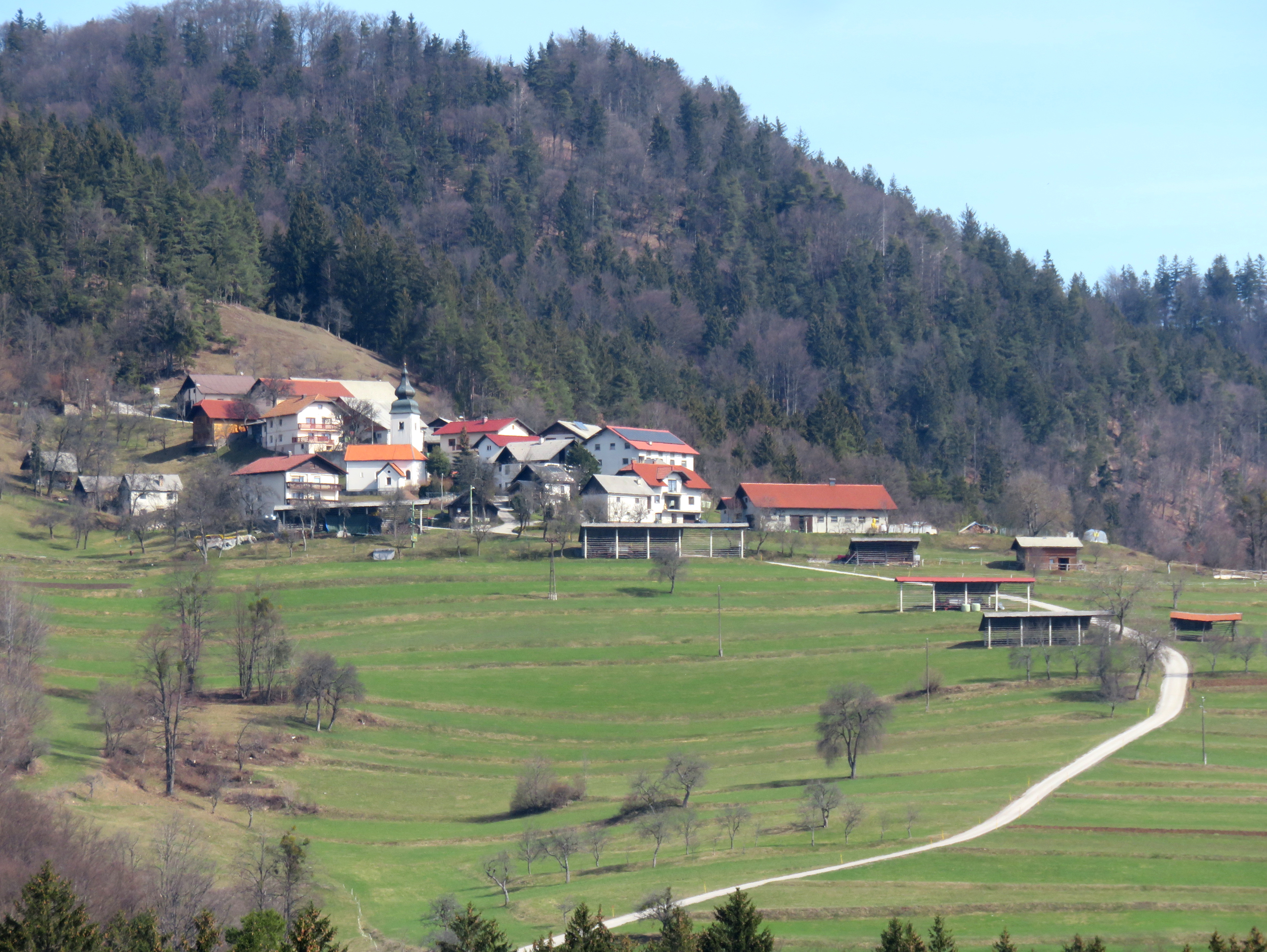

- Location in Slovenia
- Coordinates: 46°7′18.47″N 14°55′7″E
- Country: Slovenia
- Traditional region: Upper Carniola
- Statistical region: Central Sava
- Municipality: Zagorje ob Savi

Area
  - Total: 2.46 km^{2} (0.95 sq mi)
- Elevation: 700.9 m (2,300 ft)

Population (2002)
  - Total: 36
- Postal code: 1410

Golče (pronounced [ˈɡoːu̯tʃɛ]; in older sources also Goliše, German: Goltsche) is a village in the Municipality of Zagorje ob Savi in central Slovenia. The area is part of the traditional region of Upper Carniola. It is now included with the rest of the municipality in the Central Sava Statistical Region. It includes the hamlet of Vežnica (German: Weschniza) north of the main settlement.

The local church is dedicated to Saint Peter and belongs to the Parish of Sveta Gora. It is a Gothic building that was restyled in the Baroque in 1703.
