= Borovak pri Podkumu =

- Location in Slovenia
- Coordinates: 46°4′29.43″N 15°3′28.96″E
- Country: Slovenia
- Traditional region: Lower Carniola
- Statistical region: Central Sava
- Municipality: Zagorje ob Savi

Area
  - Total: 4.75 km^{2} (1.83 sq mi)
- Elevation: 707.4 m (2,321 ft)

Population (2002)
  - Total: 81
- Postal code: 1414

Borovak pri Podkumu (pronounced [bɔɾɔˈʋaːk pɾi pɔˈtkuːmu]) is a settlement east of Podkum in the Municipality of Zagorje ob Savi in central Slovenia. The area is part of the traditional region of Lower Carniola. It is now included with the rest of the municipality in the Central Sava Statistical Region.

== Name ==
Borovak pri Podkumu was attested in written sources as Borabakg in 1444 and Borabakh c. 1449. The name of the settlement was changed from Borovak to Borovak pri Podkumu in 1955.

== Church ==
The local church (building) in the settlement is dedicated to Saint Ursula and belongs to the Parish of Šentjurij–Podkum. It is a Gothic building that was extended in the 17th century and restyled around 1800.
