= Čolnišče =

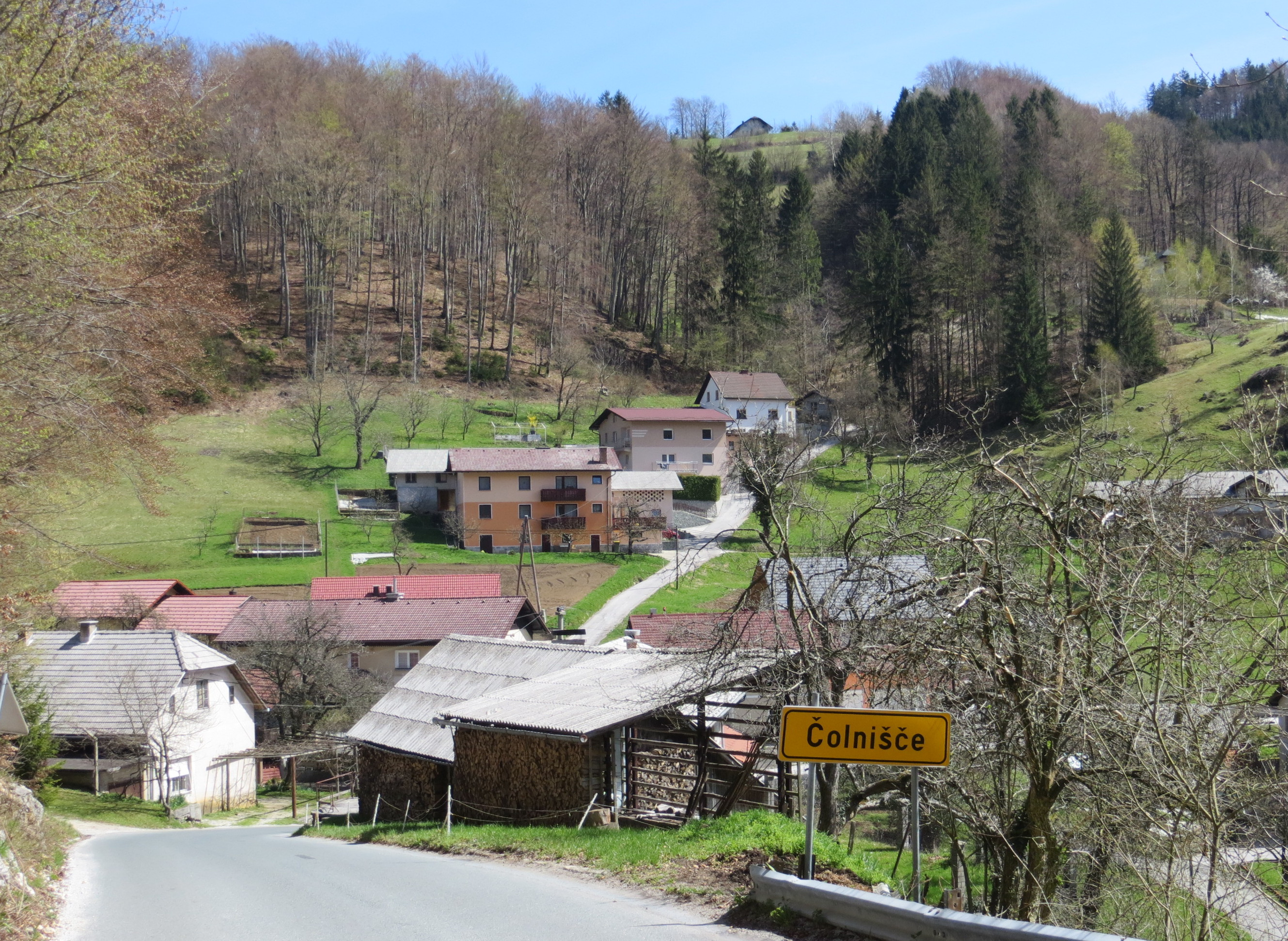

- Location in Slovenia
- Coordinates: 46°7′30.57″N 14°58′5.45″E
- Country: Slovenia
- Traditional region: Upper Carniola
- Statistical region: Central Sava
- Municipality: Zagorje ob Savi

Area
  - Total: 2.21 km^{2} (0.85 sq mi)
- Elevation: 497.6 m (1,633 ft)

Population (2002)
  - Total: 194
- Postal code: 1410

Čolnišče (pronounced [tʃɔu̯ˈniːʃtʃɛ]) is a settlement west of Zagorje ob Savi in central Slovenia. The area is part of the traditional region of Upper Carniola. It is now included with the rest of the municipality in the Central Sava Statistical Region.

== Geography ==
The main part of Čolnišče consists of two hamlets: Zgornje Čolnišče and Spodnje Čolnišče (literally, 'upper' and 'lower' Čolnišče). Other hamlets in the settlement are Krbulje and Prečna. The village lies above a small valley with an intermittent spring; when it is flowing, the resulting stream disappears into the ground at Prečna. The soil is loamy and fertile.

== Church ==
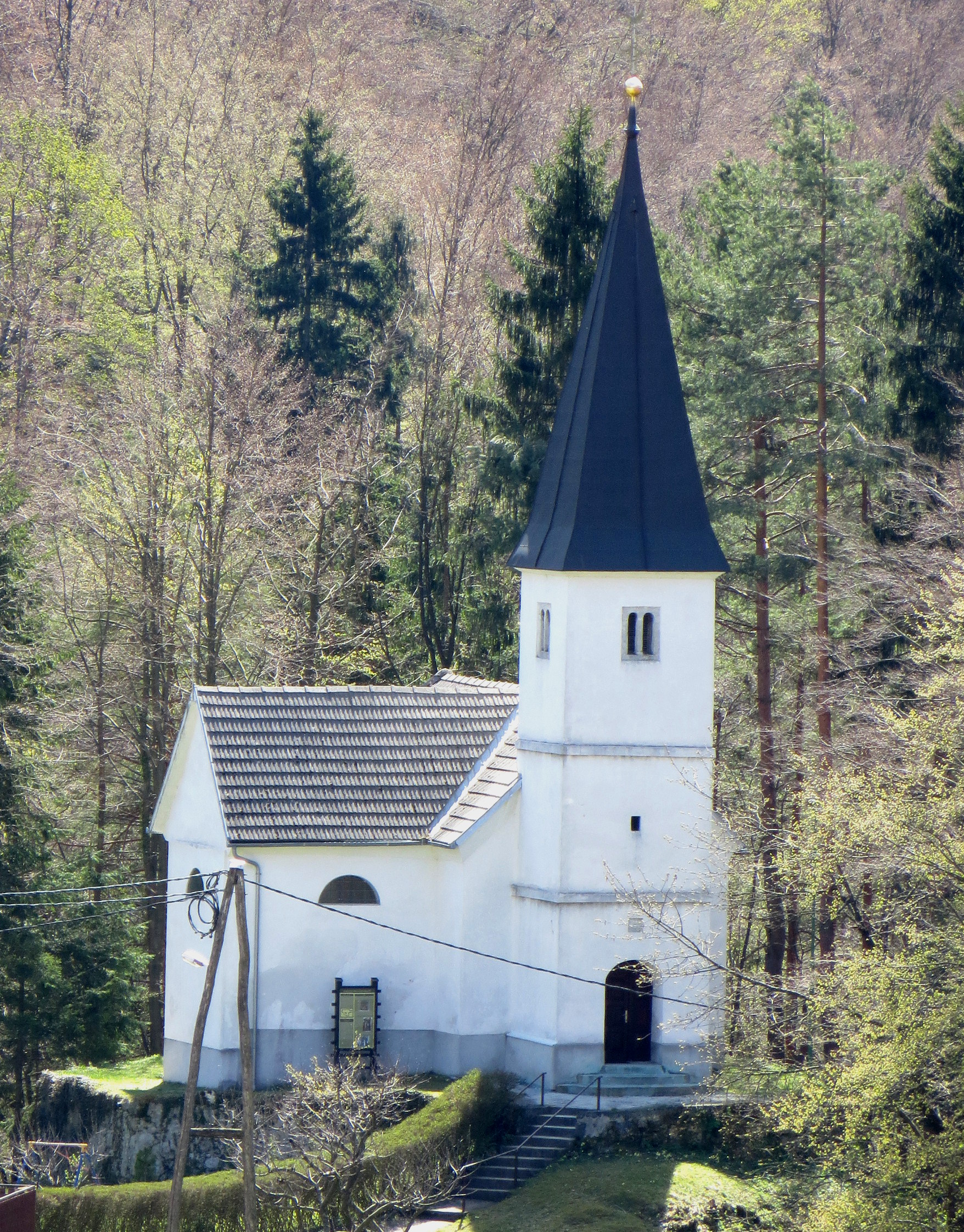
Saint Nicholas's Church

The local church is dedicated to Saint Nicholas and belongs to the Parish of Šentlambert. It dates to the 17th century.
