= Vrh pri Mlinšah =

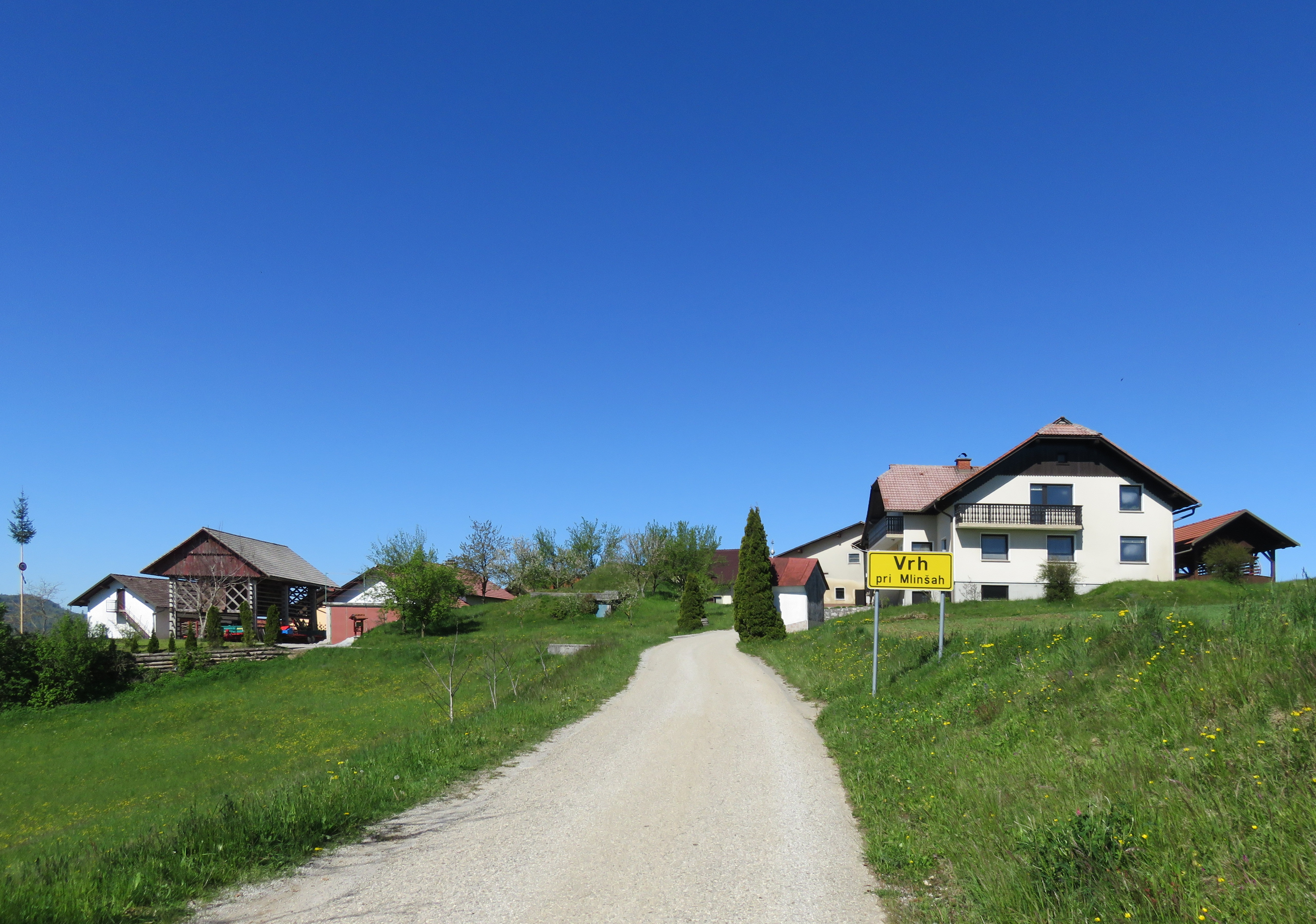

- Location in Slovenia
- Coordinates: 46°8′56.34″N 14°50′40.28″E
- Country: Slovenia
- Traditional region: Upper Carniola
- Statistical region: Central Sava
- Municipality: Zagorje ob Savi

Area
  - Total: 1.19 km^{2} (0.46 sq mi)
- Elevation: 636.8 m (2,089 ft)

Population (2002)
  - Total: 39
- Postal code: 1411

Vrh pri Mlinšah (pronounced [ˈʋəɾx pɾi ˈmliːnʃax]) is a settlement west of Mlinše in the Municipality of Zagorje ob Savi in central Slovenia. The area is part of the traditional region of Upper Carniola. It is now included with the rest of the municipality in the Central Sava Statistical Region.

== Name ==
The name of the settlement was changed from Vrh to Vrh pri Mlinšah in 1955.
