= Rtiče =

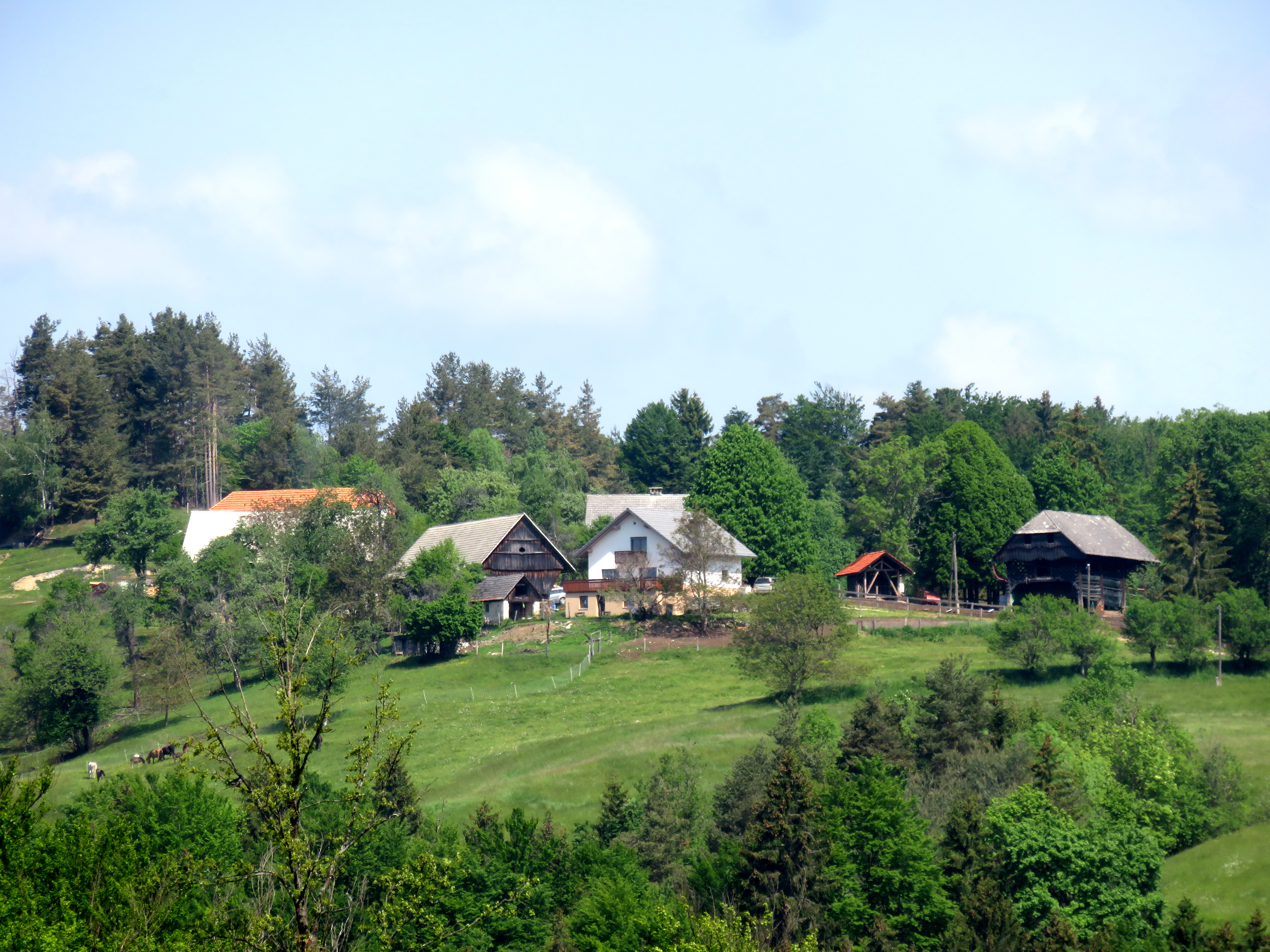

- Location in Slovenia
- Coordinates: 46°4′1.95″N 14°59′53.01″E
- Country: Slovenia
- Traditional region: Lower Carniola
- Statistical region: Central Sava
- Municipality: Zagorje ob Savi

Area
  - Total: 1.08 km^{2} (0.42 sq mi)
- Elevation: 764.9 m (2,510 ft)

Population (2002)
  - Total: 15
- Postal code: 1414

Rtiče (pronounced [əɾˈtiːtʃɛ]; in older sources also Artiče, formerly Sveti Bric, German: Sankt Brizi) is a settlement west of Podkum in the Municipality of Zagorje ob Savi in central Slovenia. The area is part of the traditional region of Lower Carniola. It is now included with the rest of the municipality in the Central Sava Statistical Region.

== Church ==
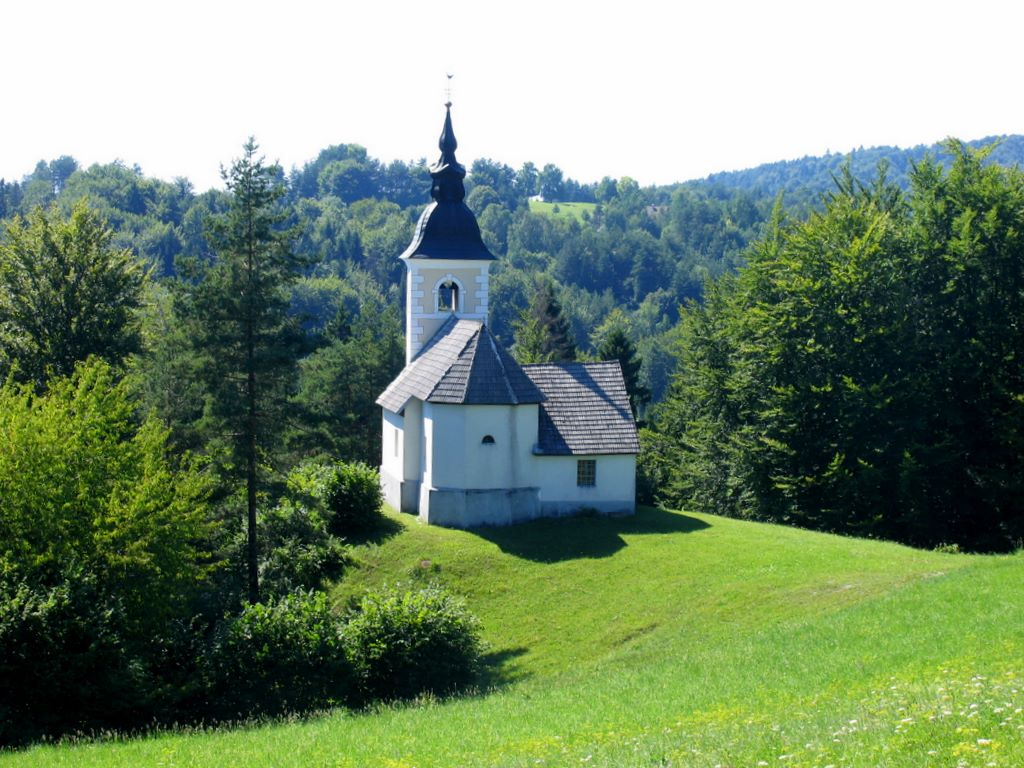
Saint Brice's Church

The local church is dedicated to Saint Brice (Slovene: sveti Bric) and belongs to the Parish of Šentjurij–Podkum. It dates to the 17th century.
