= Potoška Vas =

- Location in Slovenia
- Coordinates: 46°9′18.41″N 15°0′49.4″E
- Country: Slovenia
- Traditional region: Upper Carniola
- Statistical region: Central Sava
- Municipality: Zagorje ob Savi

Area
  - Total: 2.82 km^{2} (1.09 sq mi)
- Elevation: 333.4 m (1,094 ft)

Population (2002)
  - Total: 222
- Postal code: 1410

Potoška Vas (pronounced [pɔˈtoːʃka ˈʋaːs]; Slovene: Potoška vas, German: Potoschkawas) is a village north of Zagorje ob Savi in central Slovenia. The area is part of the traditional region of Upper Carniola. It is now included with the rest of the Municipality of Zagorje ob Savi in the Central Sava Statistical Region.

The Zagorje ob Savi airstrip is located south of the settlement.
