= Prapreče, Zagorje ob Savi =

Prapreče
- Location in Slovenia
- Coordinates: 46°8′56.71″N 15°1′7.57″E
- Country: Slovenia
- Traditional region: Upper Carniola
- Statistical region: Central Sava
- Municipality: Zagorje ob Savi

Area
  - Total: 0.43 km^{2} (0.17 sq mi)
- Elevation: 368.9 m (1,210 ft)

Population (2002)
  - Total: 52
- Postal code: 1410

Prapreče (pronounced [ˈpɾaːpɾɛtʃɛ]) is a settlement north of Zagorje ob Savi in central Slovenia. The area is part of the traditional region of Upper Carniola. It is now included with the rest of the Municipality of Zagorje ob Savi in the Central Sava Statistical Region.
