= Zabreznik =

- Location in Slovenia
- Coordinates: 46°10′4.69″N 14°56′42.33″E
- Country: Slovenia
- Traditional region: Upper Carniola
- Statistical region: Central Sava
- Municipality: Zagorje ob Savi

Area
  - Total: 1.14 km^{2} (0.44 sq mi)
- Elevation: 526.4 m (1,727 ft)

Population (2002)
  - Total: 39
- Postal code: 1411

Zabreznik (pronounced [zaˈbɾeːznik]) is a settlement northeast of Izlake in the Municipality of Zagorje ob Savi in central Slovenia. The area is part of the traditional region of Upper Carniola. It is now included with the rest of the municipality in the Central Sava Statistical Region.

The local church is dedicated to Saint Nicholas and belongs to the Parish of Izlake. It is a medieval building that was restyled in the Baroque in the second half of the 18th century.
