= Polšina =

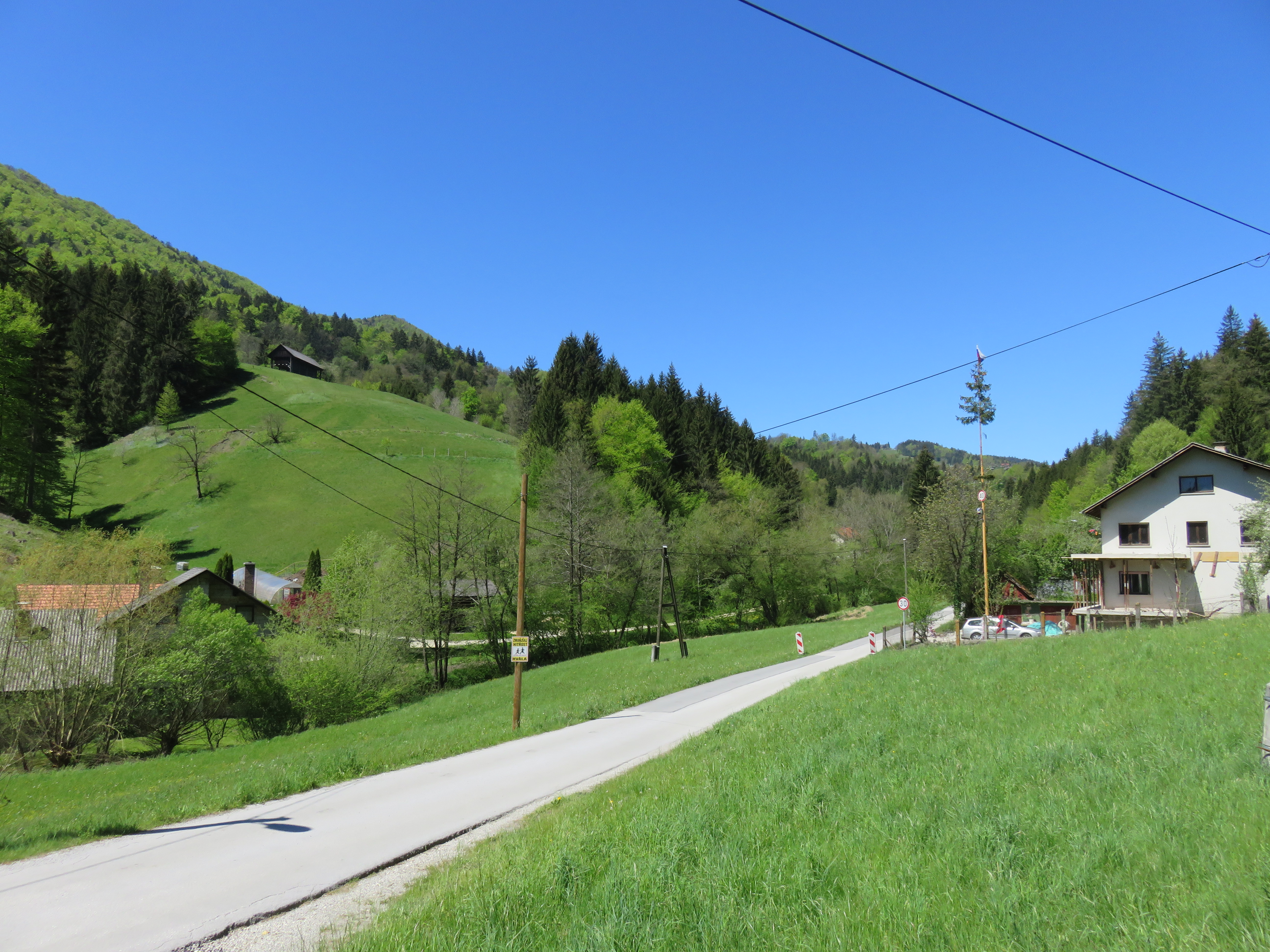

- Location in Slovenia
- Coordinates: 46°10′49.92″N 14°53′50.69″E
- Country: Slovenia
- Traditional region: Upper Carniola
- Statistical region: Central Sava
- Municipality: Zagorje ob Savi

Area
  - Total: 1.09 km^{2} (0.42 sq mi)
- Elevation: 387.4 m (1,271 ft)

Population (2002)
  - Total: 64
- Time zone: UTC +1
  - Summer (DST): UTC +2
- Postal code: 1222

Polšina (pronounced [pɔu̯ˈʃiːna] or [ˈpoːu̯ʃina]) is a small settlement southeast of Trojane in central Slovenia. It belongs to the Municipality of Zagorje ob Savi. The area is part of the traditional region of Upper Carniola. It is now included with the rest of the municipality in the Central Sava Statistical Region.
