= Dolgo Brdo pri Mlinšah =

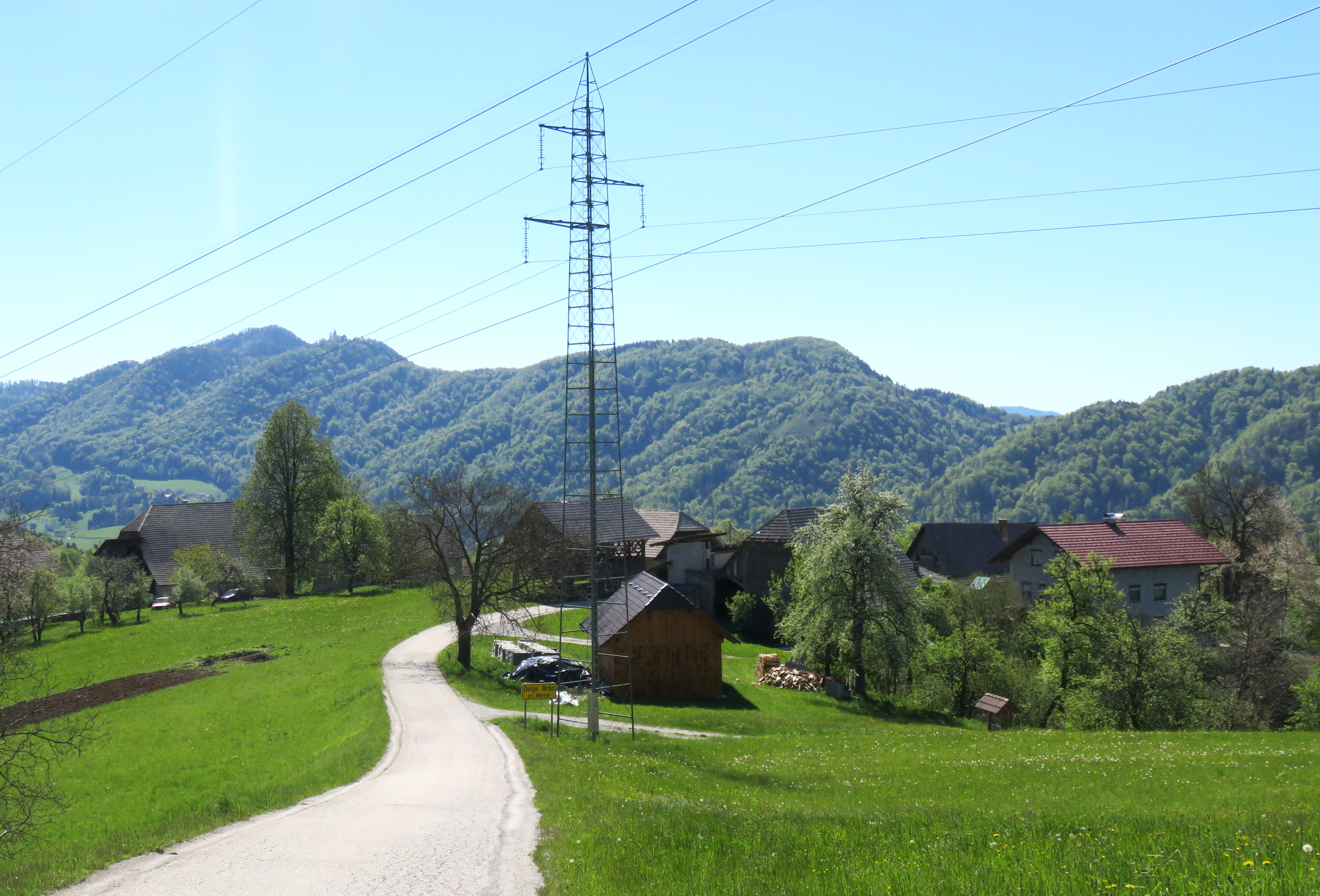

- Location in Slovenia
- Coordinates: 46°8′45.7″N 14°51′15.73″E
- Country: Slovenia
- Traditional region: Upper Carniola
- Statistical region: Central Sava
- Municipality: Zagorje ob Savi

Area
  - Total: 1.02 km^{2} (0.39 sq mi)
- Elevation: 594.4 m (1,950 ft)

Population (2002)
  - Total: 50
- Postal code: 1411

Dolgo Brdo pri Mlinšah (pronounced [ˈdoːu̯ɡɔ ˈbəɾdɔ pɾi ˈmliːnʃax]) is a settlement west of Izlake in the Municipality of Zagorje ob Savi in central Slovenia. The area is part of the traditional region of Upper Carniola. It is now included with the rest of the municipality in the Central Sava Statistical Region.

== Name ==
The name of the settlement was changed from Dolgo Brdo to Dolgo Brdo pri Mlinšah in 1953.

== Cultural heritage ==
A small chapel-shrine in the settlement is dedicated to Our Lady of Sorrows and dates to the late 19th century.
