= Medija =

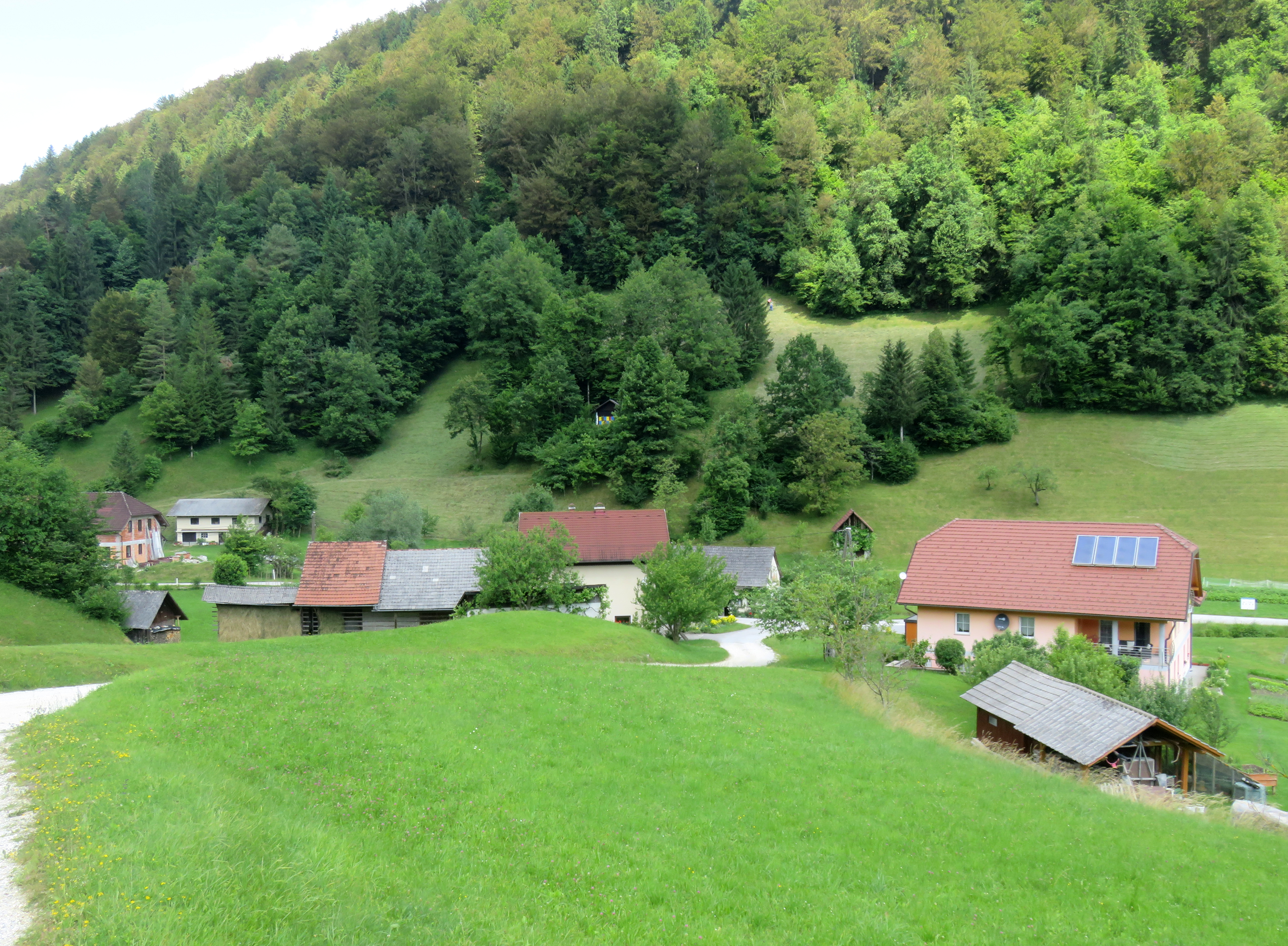

- Location in Slovenia
- Coordinates: 46°9′34.9″N 14°50′46.7″E
- Country: Slovenia
- Traditional region: Upper Carniola
- Statistical region: Central Sava
- Municipality: Zagorje ob Savi

Area
  - Total: 0.28 km^{2} (0.11 sq mi)
- Elevation: 432.8 m (1,420 ft)

Population (2002)
  - Total: 49
- Postal code: 1411

Medija (pronounced [mɛˈdiːja]; German: Gallenegg) is a small settlement in the Municipality of Zagorje ob Savi in central Slovenia. It lies along the upper valley of Medija Creek, a minor left tributary of the Sava River. The area is part of the traditional region of Upper Carniola. It is now included with the rest of the municipality in the Central Sava Statistical Region.

== Name ==
Medija was attested in written sources in 1360 as Mudey and Modey. The name is probably originally a hydronym of uncertain origin. The name may be pre-Slavic; the ending -ija implies that it is of non-Slovene origin.
