= Razpotje, Zagorje ob Savi =

Razpotje
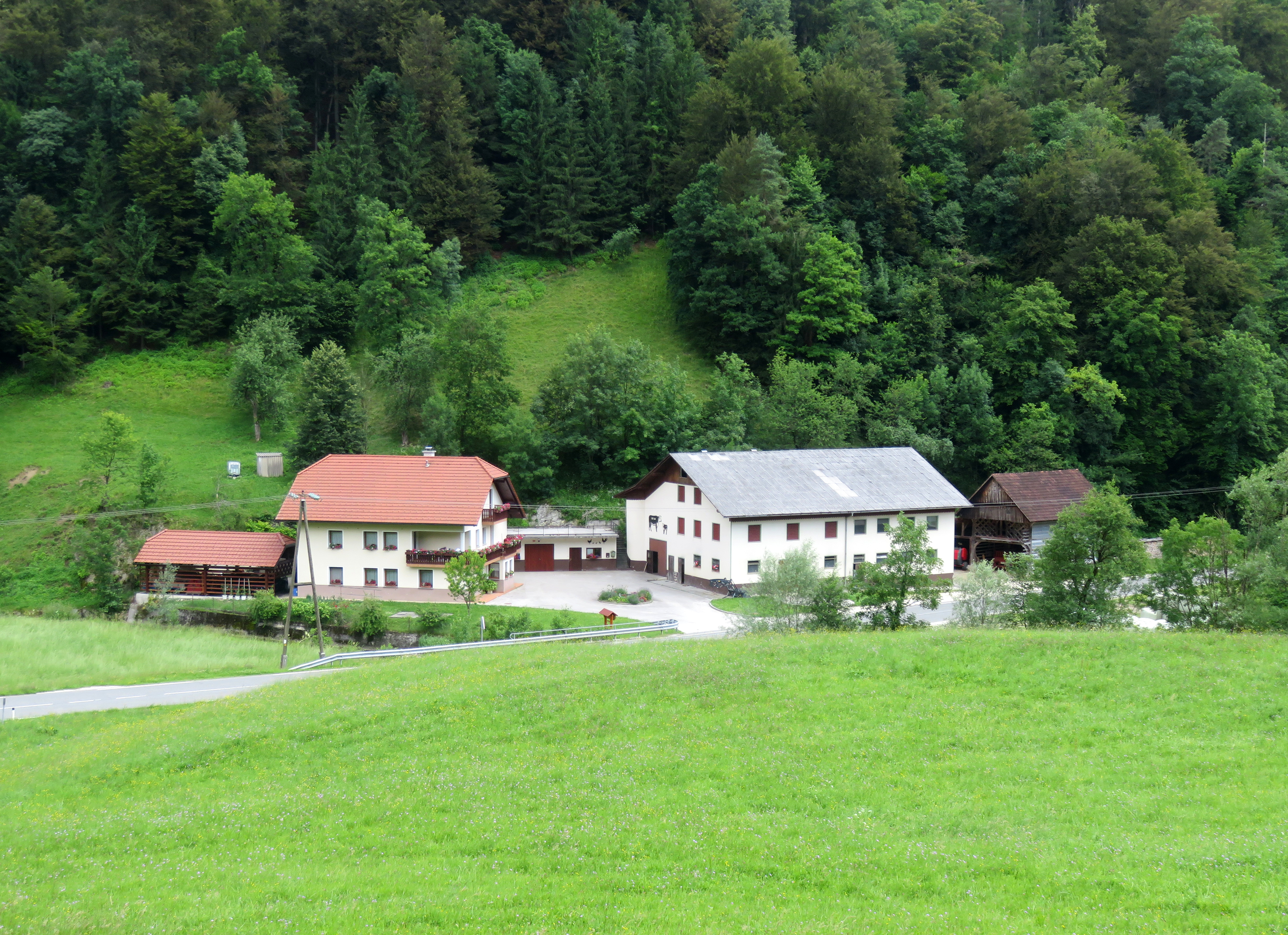

- Location in Slovenia
- Coordinates: 46°8′40.06″N 14°54′19.35″E
- Country: Slovenia
- Traditional region: Upper Carniola
- Statistical region: Central Sava
- Municipality: Zagorje ob Savi

Area
  - Total: 0.38 km^{2} (0.15 sq mi)
- Elevation: 420.4 m (1,379 ft)

Population (2002)
  - Total: 19
- Postal code: 1411

Razpotje (pronounced [ˈɾaːspɔtjɛ]) is a small settlement west of Izlake in the Municipality of Zagorje ob Savi in central Slovenia. The area is part of the traditional region of Upper Carniola. It is now included with the rest of the municipality in the Central Sava Statistical Region.
