= Dobrljevo =

- Location in Slovenia
- Coordinates: 46°10′48.07″N 14°55′57.06″E
- Country: Slovenia
- Traditional region: Upper Carniola
- Statistical region: Central Sava
- Municipality: Zagorje ob Savi

Area
  - Total: 1.4 km^{2} (0.54 sq mi)
- Elevation: 653.9 m (2,145 ft)

Population (2002)
  - Total: 94
- Postal code: 1413

Dobrljevo (pronounced [dɔbəɾˈljeːʋɔ]) is a settlement north of Izlake in the Municipality of Zagorje ob Savi in central Slovenia. The area is part of the traditional region of Upper Carniola. It is now included with the rest of the municipality in the Central Sava Statistical Region.

On Pleša Hill above the settlement, archaeological remains have been discovered of what seems to have been an Ancient Roman fort on a strategic site for controlling traffic on the major Roman throughway via nearby Atrans.
