= Rove, Zagorje ob Savi =

Rove
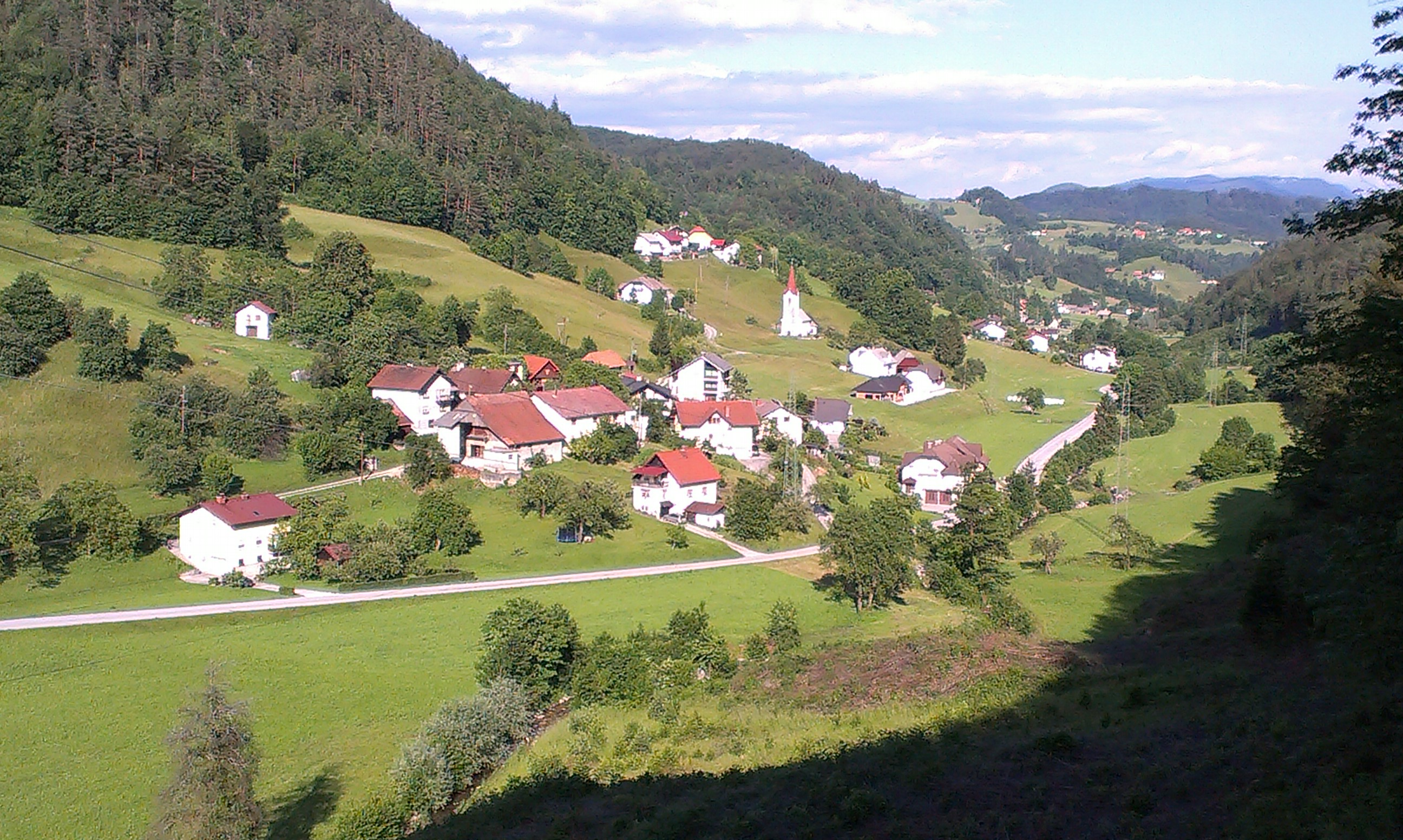

- Location in Slovenia
- Coordinates: 46°9′27.16″N 14°59′7.79″E
- Country: Slovenia
- Traditional region: Upper Carniola
- Statistical region: Central Sava
- Municipality: Zagorje ob Savi

Area
  - Total: 1.19 km^{2} (0.46 sq mi)
- Elevation: 363.7 m (1,193 ft)

Population (2002)
  - Total: 173
- Postal code: 1410

Rove (pronounced [ˈɾɔːʋɛ] or [ˈɾoːʋɛ]) is a village northwest of Zagorje ob Savi in central Slovenia. The area is part of the traditional region of Upper Carniola. It is now included with the rest of the Municipality of Zagorje ob Savi in the Central Sava Statistical Region.

The local church is dedicated to the Holy Spirit (Slovene: Sveti Duh) and belongs to the Parish of Zagorje ob Savi. It dates to the 18th century.
