= Vine, Zagorje ob Savi =

Vine
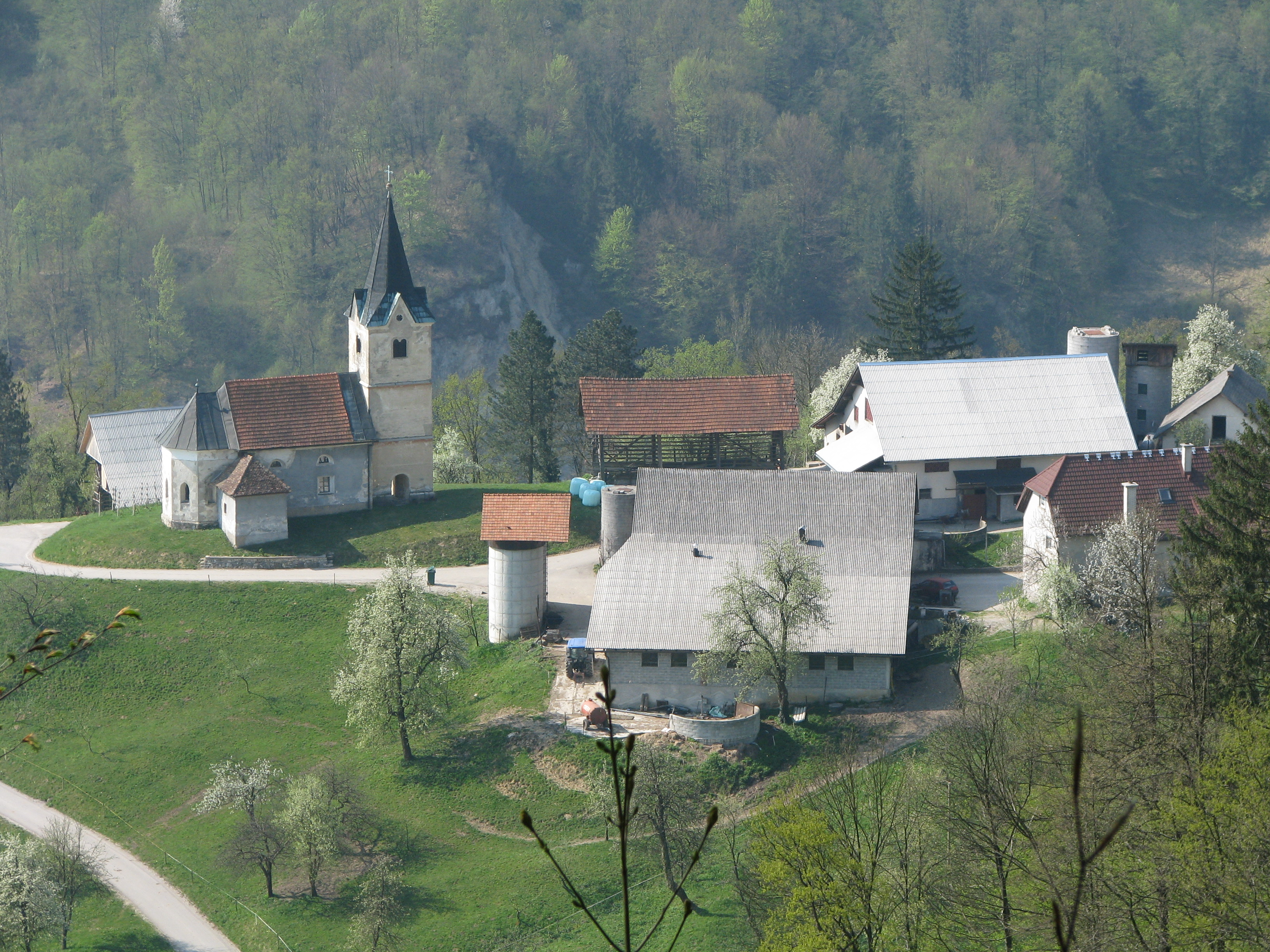

- Location in Slovenia
- Coordinates: 46°8′39.54″N 14°59′16.19″E
- Country: Slovenia
- Traditional region: Upper Carniola
- Statistical region: Central Sava
- Municipality: Zagorje ob Savi

Area
  - Total: 0.77 km^{2} (0.30 sq mi)
- Elevation: 386.2 m (1,267 ft)

Population (2002)
  - Total: 21
- Postal code: 1410

Vine (pronounced [ˈʋiːnɛ]; in older sources also Vinje, German: Wine) is a settlement in the Municipality of Zagorje ob Savi in central Slovenia. It lies in the hills immediately north of Zagorje ob Savi. The area is part of the traditional region of Upper Carniola. It is now included with the rest of the municipality in the Central Sava Statistical Region.

The local church is dedicated to John the Baptist and belongs to the Parish of Zagorje ob Savi. It dates to the early 16th century and contains some of its original frescos.
