= Loke pri Zagorju =

- Location in Slovenia
- Coordinates: 46°8′32.07″N 14°57′41.6″E
- Country: Slovenia
- Traditional region: Upper Carniola
- Statistical region: Central Sava
- Municipality: Zagorje ob Savi

Area
  - Total: 1.44 km^{2} (0.56 sq mi)
- Elevation: 278.4 m (913 ft)

Population (2002)
  - Total: 241
- Postal code: 1412

Loke pri Zagorju (pronounced [ˈloːkɛ pɾi zaˈɡoːɾju]; German: Lokach) is a settlement immediately north of Kisovec in the Municipality of Zagorje ob Savi in central Slovenia. The area is part of the traditional region of Upper Carniola. It is now included with the rest of the municipality in the Central Sava Statistical Region.

== Name ==
The name of the settlement was changed from Loke to Loke pri Zagorju in 1955.
