= Podkraj pri Zagorju =

- Location in Slovenia
- Coordinates: 46°8′19.78″N 14°58′28.2″E
- Country: Slovenia
- Traditional region: Upper Carniola
- Statistical region: Central Sava
- Municipality: Zagorje ob Savi

Area
  - Total: 2.46 km^{2} (0.95 sq mi)
- Elevation: 307.1 m (1,008 ft)

Population (2002)
  - Total: 33
- Postal code: 1410

Podkraj pri Zagorju (pronounced [pɔtˈkɾai̯ pɾi zaˈɡoːɾju]) is a settlement in the Municipality of Zagorje ob Savi in central Slovenia. It lies on the right bank of Medija Creek, between Zagorje and Kisovec. The area is part of the traditional region of Upper Carniola. It is now included with the rest of the municipality in the Central Sava Statistical Region.

== Name ==
The name of the settlement was changed from Podkraj to Podkraj pri Zagorju in 1953.
