= Breznik, Zagorje ob Savi =

Breznik
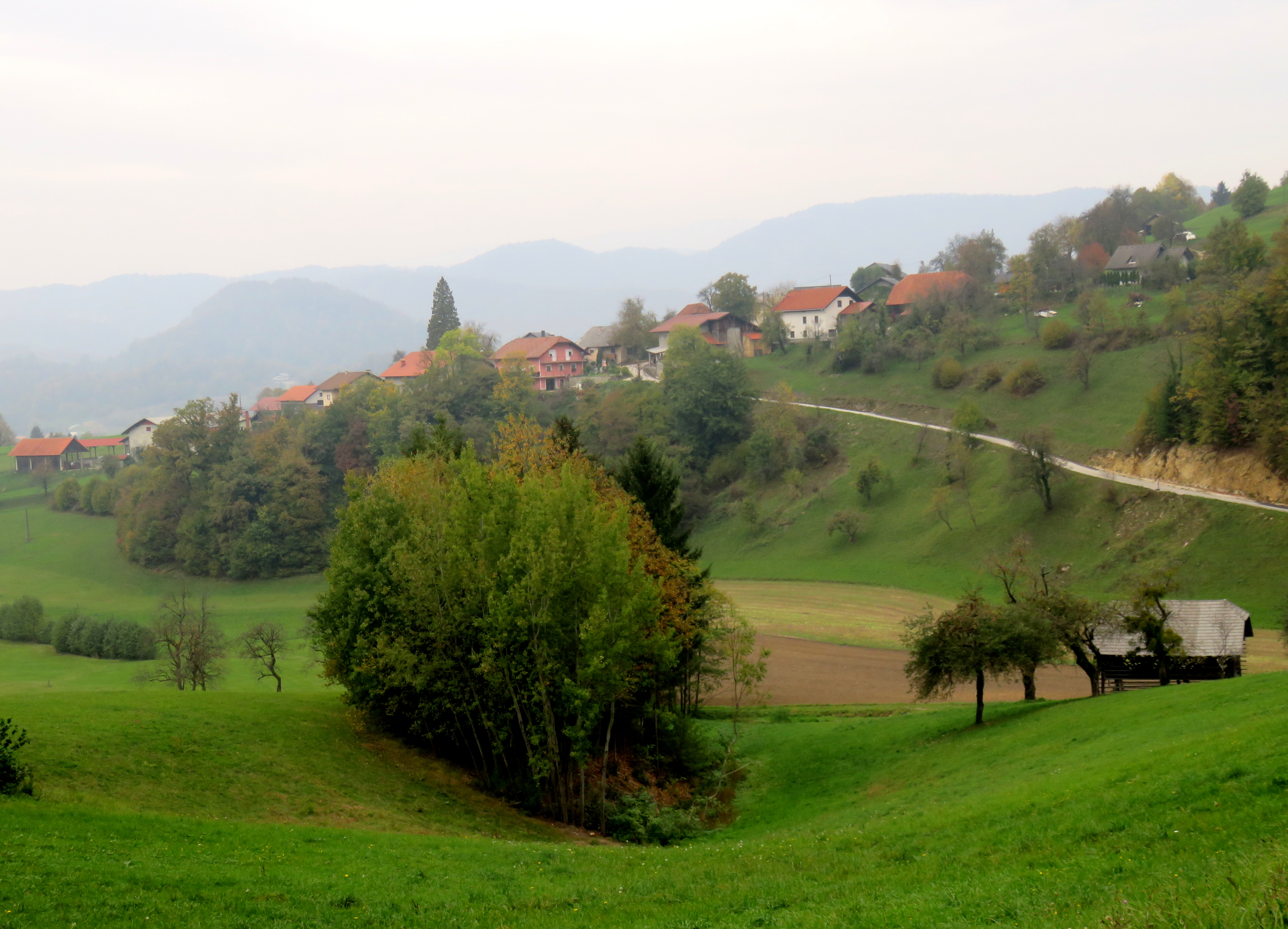

- Location in Slovenia
- Coordinates: 46°8′17.65″N 14°53′10.43″E
- Country: Slovenia
- Traditional region: Upper Carniola
- Statistical region: Central Sava
- Municipality: Zagorje ob Savi

Area
  - Total: 0.20 km^{2} (0.077 sq mi)
- Elevation: 513 m (1,683 ft)

Population (2002)
  - Total: 35
- Postal code: 1411

Breznik (pronounced [ˈbɾeːznik]) is a settlement southwest of Izlake in the Municipality of Zagorje ob Savi in central Slovenia. The area is part of the traditional region of Upper Carniola. It is now included with the rest of the municipality in the Central Sava Statistical Region.

== Name ==
Breznik was attested in written sources as Bressnikg in 1444, among other spellings.
