= Mali Kum =

- Location in Slovenia
- Coordinates: 46°4′47.87″N 15°4′14.13″E
- Country: Slovenia
- Traditional region: Lower Carniola
- Statistical region: Central Sava
- Municipality: Zagorje ob Savi

Area
  - Total: 0.86 km^{2} (0.33 sq mi)
- Elevation: 811.5 m (2,662 ft)

Population (2002)
  - Total: 28
- Postal code: 1414

Mali Kum (pronounced [ˈmaːli ˈkuːm]; German: Kleinkum) is a small village on the southern slopes of Mount Kum in the Municipality of Zagorje ob Savi in central Slovenia. The area is part of the traditional region of Lower Carniola. It is now included with the rest of the municipality in the Central Sava Statistical Region.
