= Jelševica =

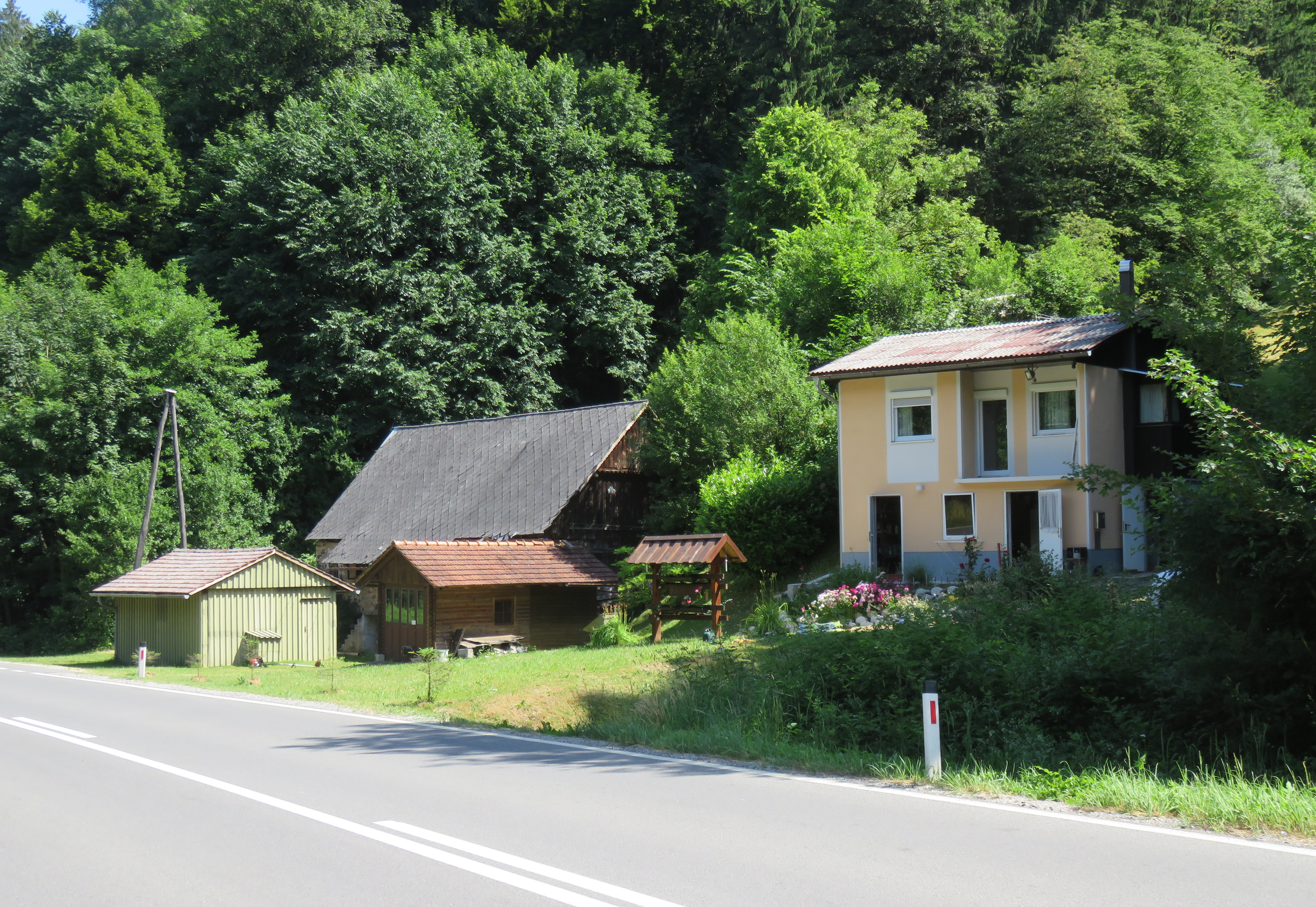

- Location in Slovenia
- Coordinates: 46°12′13.83″N 14°54′8.26″E
- Country: Slovenia
- Traditional region: Upper Carniola
- Statistical region: Central Sava
- Municipality: Zagorje ob Savi

Area
  - Total: 0.89 km^{2} (0.34 sq mi)
- Elevation: 532.4 m (1,747 ft)

Population (2002)
  - Total: 6
- Postal code: 1222

Jelševica (pronounced [ˈjeːu̯ʃɛʋitsa]) is a small dispersed settlement in the Municipality of Zagorje ob Savi in central Slovenia. It lies just east of the main motorway from Ljubljana to Maribor. The area is part of the traditional region of Upper Carniola. It is now included with the rest of the municipality in the Central Sava Statistical Region.
