= Selo pri Zagorju =

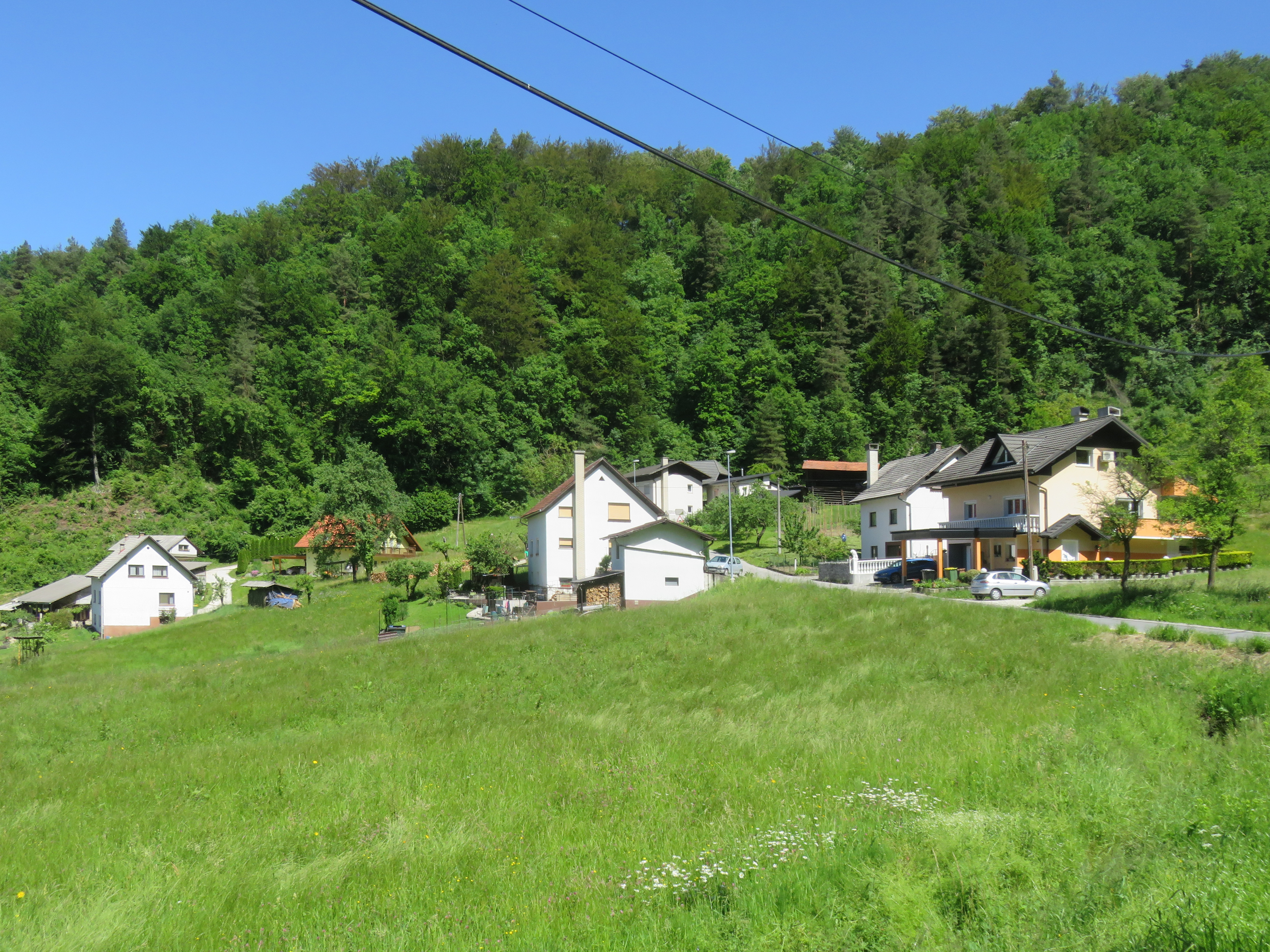

- Location in Slovenia
- Coordinates: 46°7′58.08″N 15°0′27.48″E
- Country: Slovenia
- Traditional region: Upper Carniola
- Statistical region: Central Sava
- Municipality: Zagorje ob Savi

Area
  - Total: 1.24 km^{2} (0.48 sq mi)
- Elevation: 316.5 m (1,038 ft)

Population (2002)
  - Total: 324
- Postal code: 1410

Selo pri Zagorju (pronounced [ˈsɛːlɔ pɾi zaˈɡoːɾju]) is a settlement immediately east of Zagorje ob Savi in central Slovenia. The area is part of the traditional region of Upper Carniola. It is now included with the rest of the Municipality of Zagorje ob Savi in the Central Sava Statistical Region.

== Name ==
The name of the settlement was changed from Selo to Selo pri Zagorju in 1953.
