= Sopota, Zagorje ob Savi =

Sopota
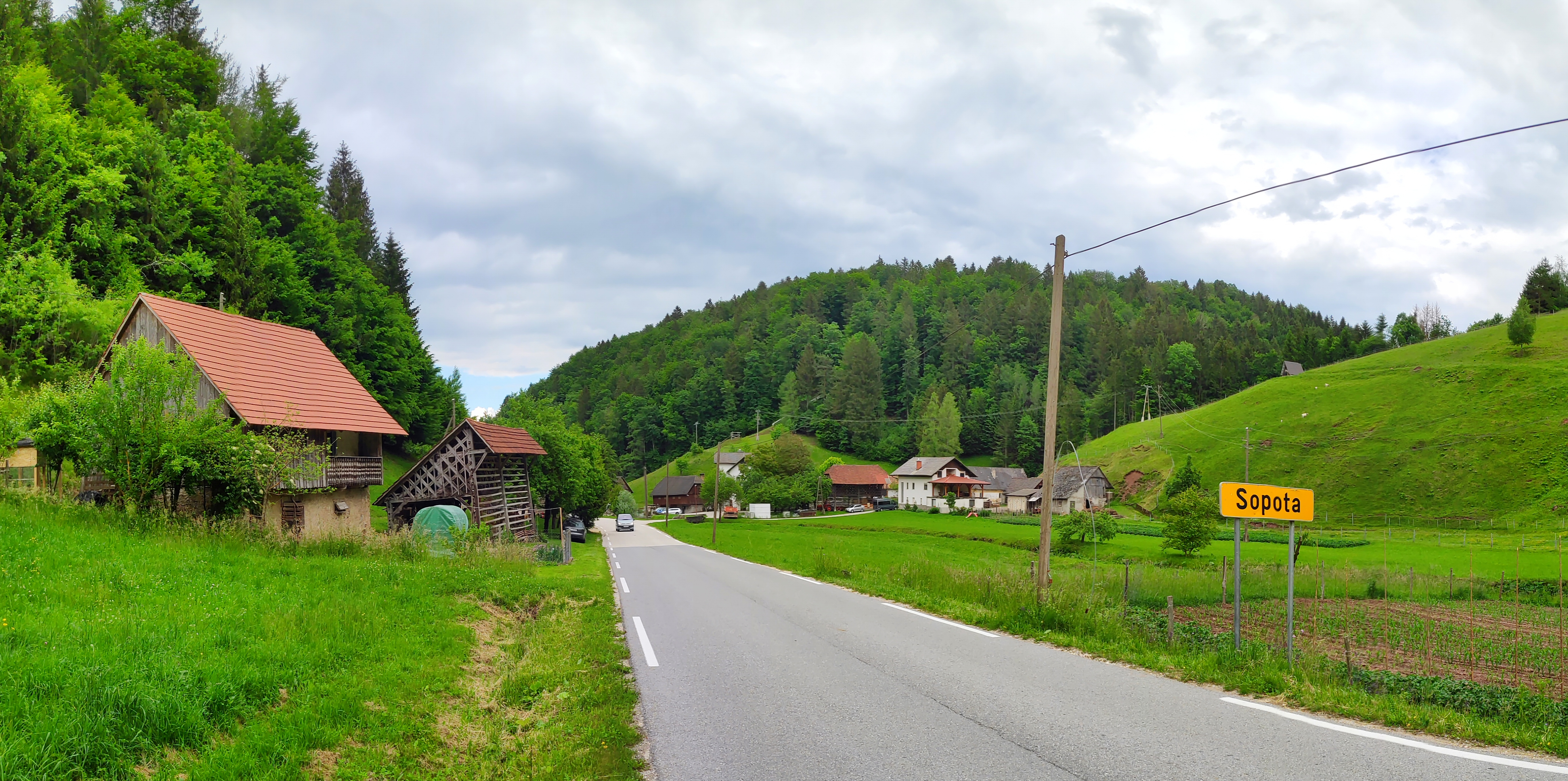

- Location in Slovenia
- Coordinates: 46°3′38.92″N 15°2′40.05″E
- Country: Slovenia
- Traditional region: Lower Carniola
- Statistical region: Central Sava
- Municipality: Zagorje ob Savi

Area
  - Total: 0.79 km^{2} (0.31 sq mi)
- Elevation: 566.4 m (1,858 ft)

Population (2002)
  - Total: 52
- Postal code: 1414

Sopota (pronounced [sɔˈpoːta]) is a settlement south of Podkum in the Municipality of Zagorje ob Savi in central Slovenia. The area is part of the traditional region of Lower Carniola. It is now included with the rest of the municipality in the Central Sava Statistical Region.

== History ==
Sopota was a hamlet of Podkum until 1999, when it was separated from it and made a separate village.
