= Ravne pri Mlinšah =

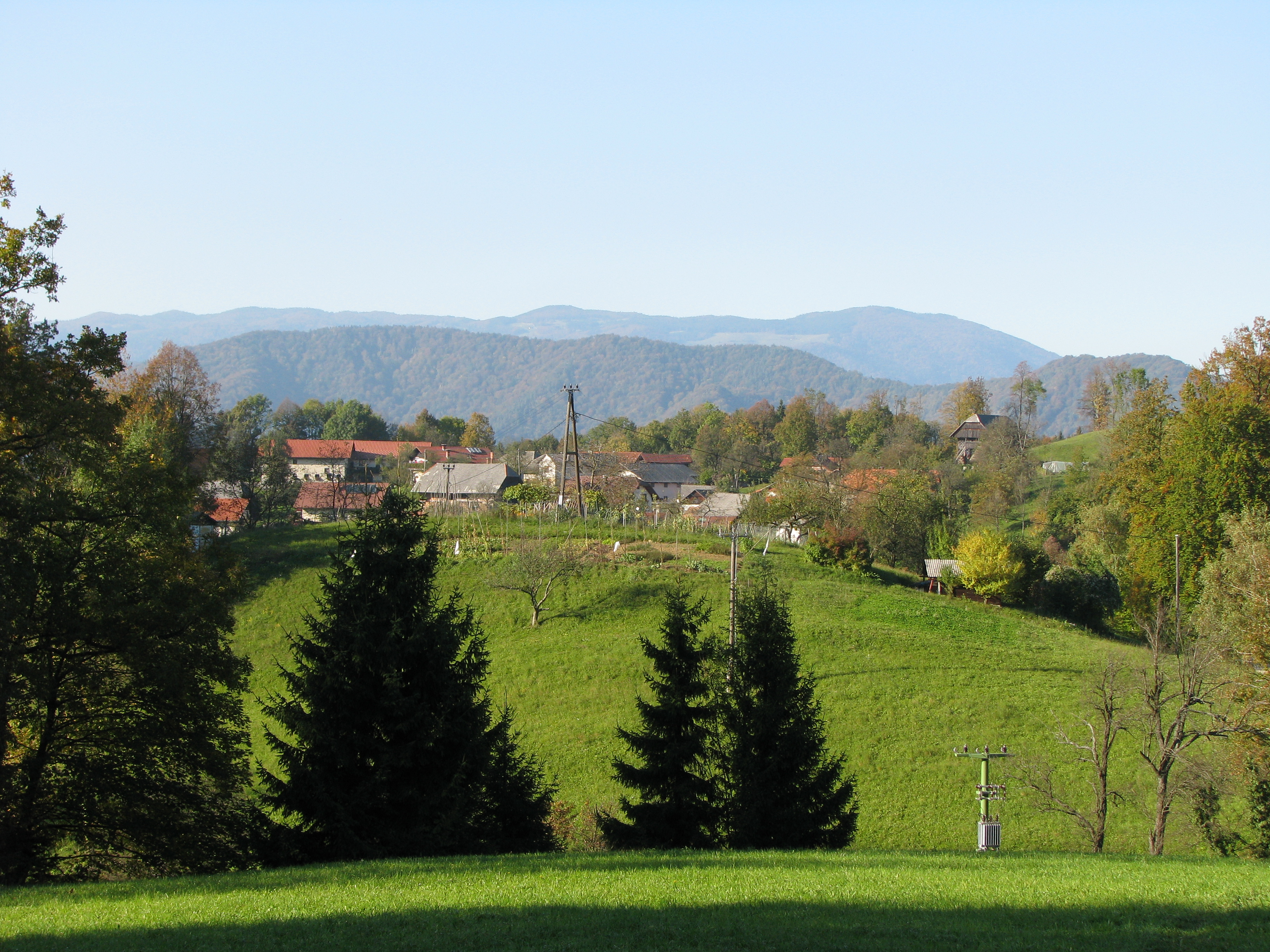

- Location in Slovenia
- Coordinates: 46°8′12.51″N 14°54′2.62″E
- Country: Slovenia
- Traditional region: Upper Carniola
- Statistical region: Central Sava
- Municipality: Zagorje ob Savi

Area
  - Total: 2.13 km^{2} (0.82 sq mi)
- Elevation: 543.2 m (1,782 ft)

Population (2002)
  - Total: 50
- Postal code: 1410

Ravne pri Mlinšah (pronounced [ˈɾáːwnɛ pɾi ˈmliːnʃax]) is a settlement southeast of Mlinše in the Municipality of Zagorje ob Savi in central Slovenia. The area is part of the traditional region of Upper Carniola. It is now included with the rest of the municipality in the Central Sava Statistical Region.

== Name ==
The name of the settlement was changed from Ravne to Ravne pri Mlinšah in 1955. It is referred to in some sources as Ravne pod Sveto goro.
