= Kostrevnica =

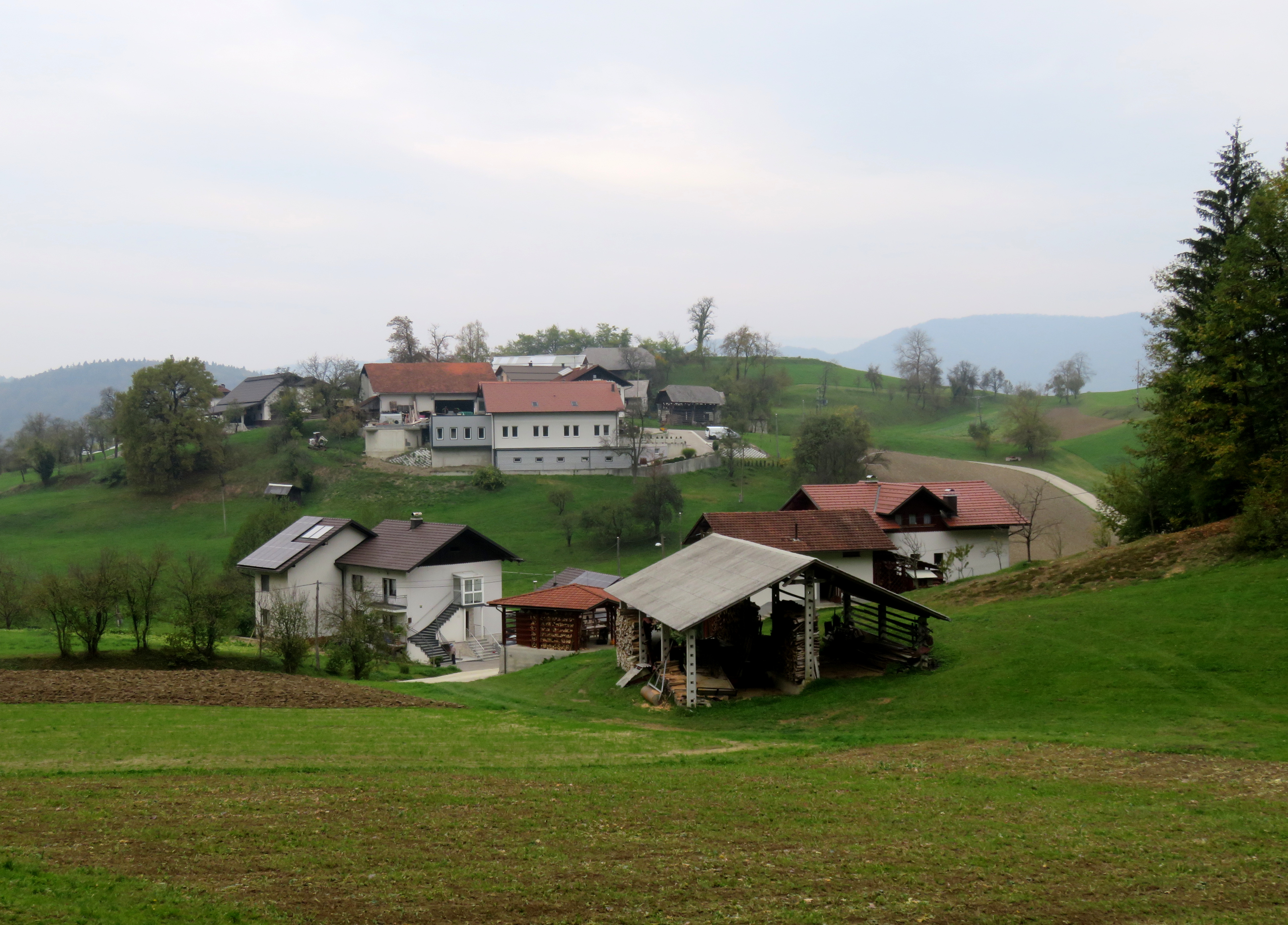

- Location in Slovenia
- Coordinates: 46°8′9.2″N 14°52′47.15″E
- Country: Slovenia
- Traditional region: Upper Carniola
- Statistical region: Central Sava
- Municipality: Zagorje ob Savi

Area
  - Total: 1.75 km^{2} (0.68 sq mi)
- Elevation: 483.8 m (1,587 ft)

Population (2002)
  - Total: 64
- Postal code: 1411

Kostrevnica (pronounced [kɔˈstɾeːu̯nitsa]) is a settlement in the hills southwest of Izlake in the Municipality of Zagorje ob Savi in central Slovenia. The area is part of the traditional region of Upper Carniola. It is now included with the rest of the municipality in the Central Sava Statistical Region.
