= Zgornji Prhovec =

Zgornji Prhovec Prhovec (until 1990)
- Location in Slovenia
- Coordinates: 46°9′47.49″N 14°55′37.09″E
- Country: Slovenia
- Traditional region: Upper Carniola
- Statistical region: Central Sava
- Municipality: Zagorje ob Savi

Area
  - Total: 0.86 km^{2} (0.33 sq mi)
- Elevation: 449.6 m (1,475 ft)

Population (2002)
  - Total: 57
- Postal code: 1411

Zgornji Prhovec (pronounced [ˈzɡoːɾnji pəɾˈxɔːʋəts] or [ˈzɡoːɾnji pəɾˈxoːʋəts]; in older sources also Perhovic; German: Perhouz) is a settlement north of Izlake in the Municipality of Zagorje ob Savi in central Slovenia. The area is part of the traditional region of Upper Carniola. It is now included with the rest of the municipality in the Central Sava Statistical Region.

== Name ==
The name of the settlement was changed from Prhovec to Zgornji Prhovec in 1990.
