= Mošenik, Zagorje ob Savi =

Mošenik
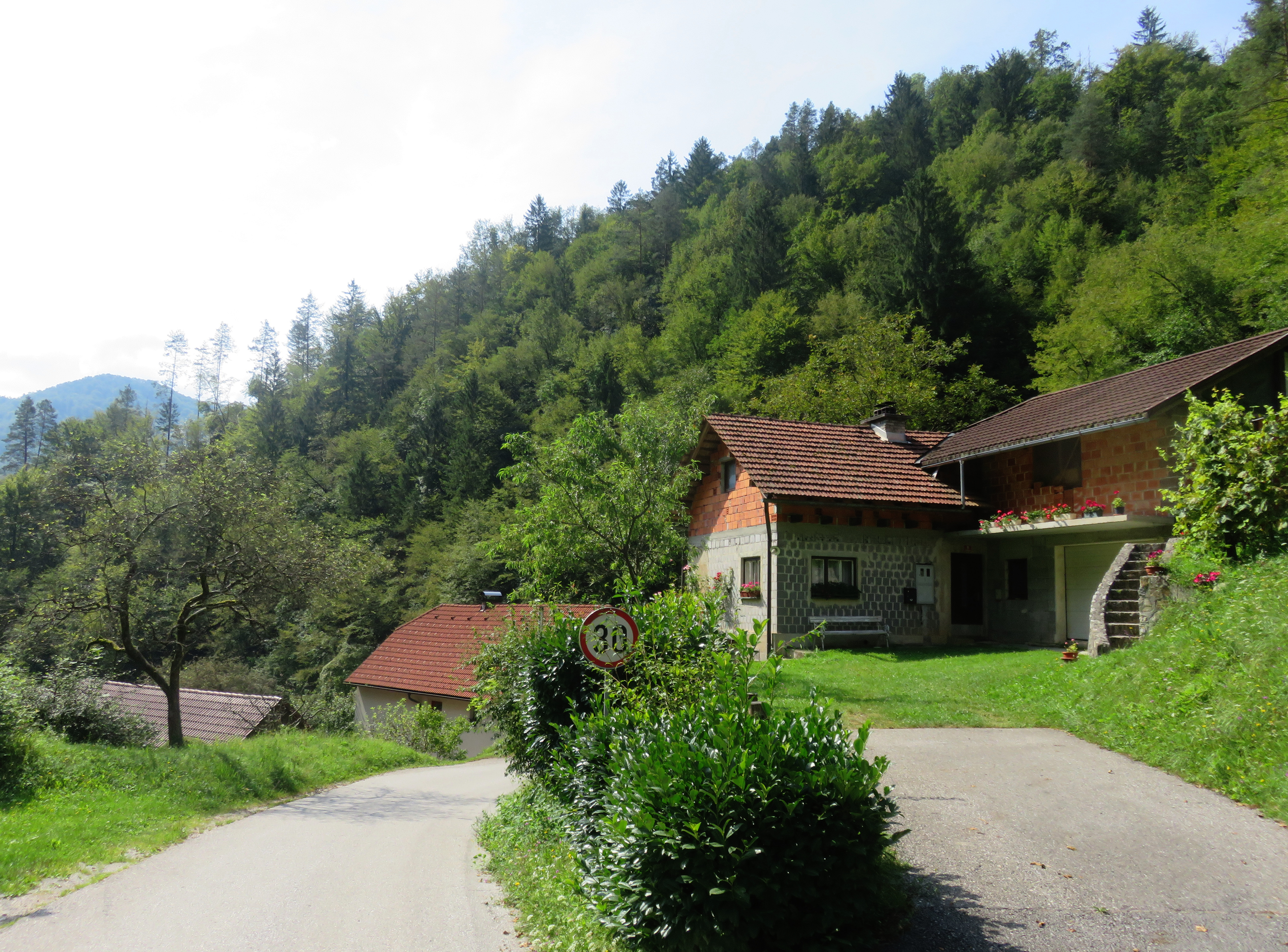

- Location in Slovenia
- Coordinates: 46°5′53.32″N 14°55′12.76″E
- Country: Slovenia
- Traditional region: Upper Carniola
- Statistical region: Central Sava
- Municipality: Zagorje ob Savi

Area
  - Total: 1.92 km^{2} (0.74 sq mi)
- Elevation: 289.1 m (948 ft)

Population (2002)
  - Total: 41
- Postal code: 1282

Mošenik (pronounced [mɔʃɛˈniːk]) is a settlement on the left bank of the Sava River in the Municipality of Zagorje ob Savi in central Slovenia. The railway line from Ljubljana to Zidani Most runs through the settlement. The area is part of the traditional region of Upper Carniola. It is now included with the rest of the municipality in the Central Sava Statistical Region.
