= Vrhe, Zagorje ob Savi =

Vrhe
- Location in Slovenia
- Coordinates: 46°11′38.99″N 14°59′23.62″E
- Country: Slovenia
- Traditional region: Lower Styria
- Statistical region: Central Sava
- Municipality: Zagorje ob Savi

Area
  - Total: 0.91 km^{2} (0.35 sq mi)
- Elevation: 845.5 m (2,774 ft)

Population (2002)
  - Total: 20
- Postal code: 1413

Vrhe (pronounced [ʋəɾˈxeː]) is a remote dispersed settlement in the hills northeast of Izlake in the Municipality of Zagorje ob Savi in central Slovenia. Traditionally the area is part of the Lower Styria region. It is now included with the rest of the municipality in the Central Sava Statistical Region.
