= Dolenja Vas, Zagorje ob Savi =

Dolenja Vas
- Location in Slovenia
- Coordinates: 46°7′56.46″N 14°59′25.05″E
- Country: Slovenia
- Traditional region: Upper Carniola
- Statistical region: Central Sava
- Municipality: Zagorje ob Savi

Area
  - Total: 1.54 km^{2} (0.59 sq mi)
- Elevation: 327.1 m (1,073 ft)

Population (2002)
  - Total: 436
- Postal code: 1410

Dolenja Vas (pronounced [dɔˈleːnja ˈʋaːs]; Slovene: Dolenja vas) is a settlement in the Municipality of Zagorje ob Savi in central Slovenia. It extends from the western outskirts of Zagorje ob Savi to the left bank of the Sava River. The area is part of the traditional region of Upper Carniola. It is now included with the rest of the municipality in the Central Sava Statistical Region.
