= Požarje =

- Location in Slovenia
- Coordinates: 46°6′31.25″N 14°57′14.2″E
- Country: Slovenia
- Traditional region: Upper Carniola
- Statistical region: Central Sava
- Municipality: Zagorje ob Savi

Area
  - Total: 1.76 km^{2} (0.68 sq mi)
- Elevation: 666.1 m (2,185 ft)

Population (2002)
  - Total: 49
- Postal code: 1410

Požarje (pronounced [pɔˈʒaːɾjɛ]) is a settlement in the hills above the left bank of the Sava River, southeast of Šentlambert in the Municipality of Zagorje ob Savi in central Slovenia. The area is part of the traditional region of Upper Carniola. It is now included with the rest of the municipality in the Central Sava Statistical Region.
