= Hrastnik pri Trojanah =

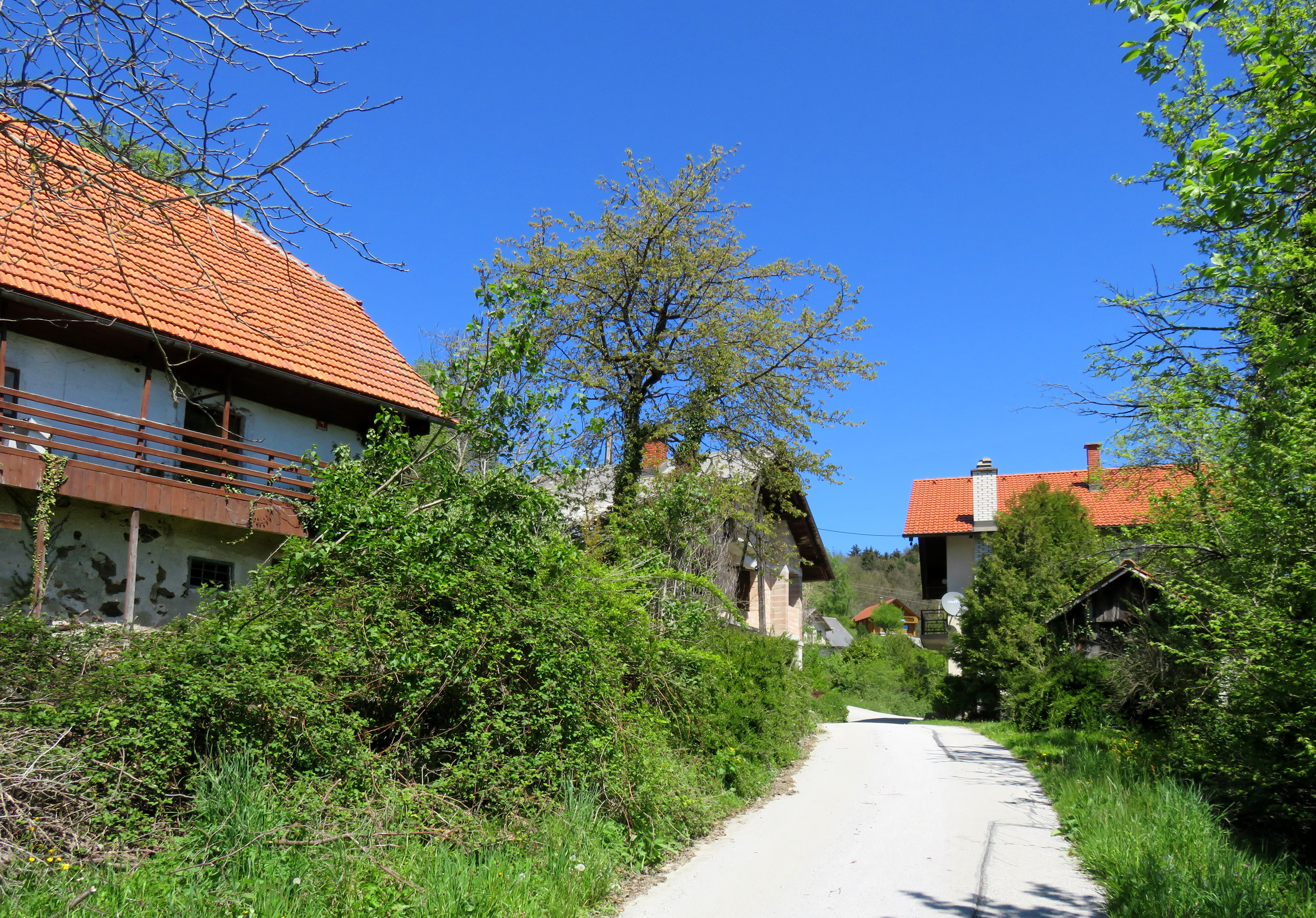

- Location in Slovenia
- Coordinates: 46°11′2.94″N 14°54′28.02″E
- Country: Slovenia
- Traditional region: Upper Carniola
- Statistical region: Central Sava
- Municipality: Zagorje ob Savi

Area
  - Total: 0.38 km^{2} (0.15 sq mi)
- Elevation: 545.5 m (1,790 ft)

Population (2002)
  - Total: 52
- Postal code: 1222

Hrastnik pri Trojanah (pronounced [ˈxɾaːstnik pɾi tɾɔˈjaːnax]; German: Hrastnigg) is a settlement east of Trojane in central Slovenia. It lies in the Municipality of Zagorje ob Savi. The area is part of the traditional region of Upper Carniola. It is now included with the rest of the municipality in the Central Sava Statistical Region.

== Name ==
The name of the settlement was changed from Hrastnik to Hrastnik pri Trojanah in 1952. In the past the German name was Hrastnigg.
