= Šemnik =

- Location in Slovenia
- Coordinates: 46°8′35.27″N 14°56′1.88″E
- Country: Slovenia
- Traditional region: Upper Carniola
- Statistical region: Central Sava
- Municipality: Zagorje ob Savi

Area
  - Total: 4.46 km^{2} (1.72 sq mi)
- Elevation: 409.3 m (1,343 ft)

Population (2002)
  - Total: 359
- Postal code: 1411

Šemnik (pronounced [ʃɛˈmniːk]; German: Schemnik) is a settlement south of Izlake in the Municipality of Zagorje ob Savi in central Slovenia. The area is part of the traditional region of Upper Carniola. It is now included with the rest of the municipality in the Central Sava Statistical Region.

The local church is dedicated to Saint Anne and belongs to the Parish of Izlake. It is a Gothic building that was restyled in the Baroque in the mid-18th century.
