= List of cities, towns, and villages in Slovenia: B =

This is a list of cities, towns, and villages in Slovenia, starting with B.

Settlement	Municipality
Babiči	Koper
Babinci	Ljutomer
Babna Brda	Šmarje pri Jelšah
Babna Gora	Dobrova-Polhov Gradec
Babna Gora	Šmarje pri Jelšah
Babna Gora	Trebnje
Babna Polica	Loška Dolina
Babna Reka	Šmarje pri Jelšah
Babni Vrt	Kranj
Babno Polje	Loška Dolina
Bač pri Materiji	Hrpelje-Kozina
Bač	Ilirska Bistrica
Bača pri Modreju	Tolmin
Bača pri Podbrdu	Tolmin
Bačne	Gorenja Vas-Poljane
Bakovci	Murska Sobota
Bakrc	Ivančna Gorica
Balkovci	Črnomelj
Bane	Velike Lašče
Banjaloka	Kostel
Banjšice	Nova Gorica
Banovci	Veržej
Banuta	Lendava
Barbana	Brda
Baredi	Izola
Barislovci	Videm
Barizoni	Koper
Barka	Divača
Bašelj	Preddvor
Bate	Nova Gorica
Batuje	Ajdovščina
Bavdek	Velike Lašče
Bavšica	Bovec
Beč	Cerknica
Bečaje	Cerknica
Bedenj	Črnomelj
Begunje na Gorenjskem	Radovljica
Begunje pri Cerknici	Cerknica
Beka	Hrpelje-Kozina
Bela Cerkev	Novo Mesto
Bela Peč	Kamnik
Bela	Ajdovščina
Bela	Kamnik
Belavšek	Videm
Belca	Kranjska Gora
Belčji Vrh	Črnomelj
Bele Vode	Šoštanj
Beli Grič	Trebnje
Beli Potok pri Frankolovem	Vojnik
Beli Potok pri Lembergu	Šmarje pri Jelšah
Belica	Dobrova-Polhov Gradec
Belica	Osilnica
Belo	Brda
Belo	Medvode
Belo	Šmarje pri Jelšah
Belovo	Laško
Belski Vrh	Zavrč
Belsko	Postojna
Belšak	Prevalje
Belšinja Vas	Trebnje
Beltinci	Beltinci
Belvedur	Koper
Benečija	Trebnje
Benedikt v Slovenskih Goricah	Benedikt
Benete	Bloke
Benica	Lendava
Bereča Vas	Metlika
Beričevo	Dol pri Ljubljani
Berinjak	Videm
Berinjek	Litija
Berkovci	Križevci
Berkovci	Moravske Toplice
Berkovski Prelogi	Križevci
Bertoki	Koper
Besnica	Ljubljana
Betanja	Divača
Betonovo	Sodražica
Bevče	Velenje
Bevke	Vrhnika
Bezena	Ruše
Bezenškovo Bukovje	Vojnik
Bezgarji	Osilnica
Bezgovica	Osilnica
Bezgovica	Šmarje pri Jelšah
Bezina	Slovenske Konjice
Beznovci	Puconci
Bezovica	Koper
Bezovica	Vojnik
Bezovje nad Zrečami	Zreče
Bezovje pri Šentjurju	Šentjur
Bezuljak	Cerknica
Bič	Trebnje
Bičje	Grosuplje
Biljana	Brda
Bilje	Miren-Kostanjevica
Binkelj	Škofja Loka
Birčna Vas	Novo Mesto
Birna Vas	Sevnica
Biserjane	Sveti Jurij ob Ščavnici
Bistra	Črna na Koroškem
Bistra	Vrhnika
Bistrica ob Dravi	Ruše
Bistrica ob Sotli	Bistrica ob Sotli
Bistrica pri Tržiču	Tržič
Bistrica	Črnomelj
Bistrica	Kozje
Bistrica	Litija
Bistrica	Naklo
Bistrica	Trebnje
Bistričica	Kamnik
Biš	Trnovska Vas
Bišče	Domžale
Bišečki Vrh	Trnovska Vas
Biška Vas	Mirna Peč
Bitiče	Litija
Bitnja Vas	Trebnje
Bitnje	Bohinj
Bizeljska Vas	Brežice
Bizeljsko	Brežice
Blagovica	Lukovica
Blaguš	Sveti Jurij ob Ščavnici
Blanca	Sevnica
Blate	Ribnica
Blatna Brezovica	Vrhnika
Blatni Vrh	Laško
Blatnik pri Črmošnjicah	Semič
Blatnik pri Črnomlju	Črnomelj
Blatno	Brežice
Blato	Slovenske Konjice
Blato	Trebnje
Blečji Vrh	Grosuplje
Bled	Bled
Blejska Dobrava	Jesenice
Bločice	Cerknica
Blodnik	Zagorje ob Savi
Bloška Polica	Cerknica
Boben	Hrastnik
Bobovek	Kranj
Bobovo pri Ponikvi	Šentjur
Bobovo pri Šmarju	Šmarje pri Jelšah
Bočaji	Koper
Bočkovo	Bloke
Bočna	Gornji Grad
Bodešče	Bled
Bodislavci	Ljutomer
Bodkovci	Juršinci
Bodonci	Puconci
Bodovlje	Škofja Loka
Bodrež	Kanal
Bodrež	Šmarje pri Jelšah
Bodrišna Vas	Šmarje pri Jelšah
Boga Vas	Ivančna Gorica
Bogenšperk	Litija
Boginja Vas	Metlika
Bogneča Vas	Trebnje
Bogo	Sežana
Bogojina	Moravske Toplice
Boharina	Zreče
Bohinjska Bela	Bled
Bohinjska Bistrica	Bohinj
Bohinjska Češnjica	Bohinj
Bohova	Hoče-Slivnica
Bojanci	Črnomelj
Bojanja Vas	Metlika
Bojanji Vrh	Ivančna Gorica
Bojsno	Brežice
Bojtina	Slovenska Bistrica
Bokrači	Puconci
Boldraž	Metlika
Bolečka Vas	Majšperk
Bolehnečici	Sveti Jurij ob Ščavnici
Boletina	Šentjur
Boltija	Litija
Bonini	Koper
Boračeva	Radenci
Boreci	Križevci
Boreča	Gornji Petrovci
Borejci	Tišina (občina)
Boričevo	Novo Mesto
Borjana	Kobarid
Borje pri Mlinšah	Zagorje ob Savi
Borje	Zagorje ob Savi
Borovak pri Podkumu	Zagorje ob Savi
Borovak pri Polšniku	Litija
Borovci	Markovci
Borovec pri Karlovici	Velike Lašče
Borovec pri Kočevski Reki	Kočevje
Borovnica	Borovnica
Boršt pri Dvoru	Žužemberk
Boršt	Brežice
Boršt	Koper
Boršt	Metlika
Bosljiva Loka	Osilnica
Bošamarin	Koper
Boštanj	Sevnica
Boštetje	Velike Lašče
Botričnica	Šentjur
Bovec	Bovec
Bovše	Vojnik
Božakovo	Metlika
Božič Vrh	Metlika
Božje	Oplotnica
Bračna Vas	Brežice
Branik	Nova Gorica
Brankovo	Velike Lašče
Branoslavci	Ljutomer
Braslovče	Braslovče
Bratislavci	Dornava
Bratnice	Ivančna Gorica
Bratonci	Beltinci
Bratonečice	Ormož
Brce	Ilirska Bistrica
Brda	Radovljica
Brda	Slovenj Gradec
Brdarci	Črnomelj
Brdce nad Dobrno	Dobrna
Brdce	Hrastnik
Brdce	Vojnik
Brdice pri Kožbani	Brda
Brdice pri Neblem	Brda
Brdinje	Ravne na Koroškem
Brdo pri Lukovici	Lukovica
Brdo	Domžale
Brdo	Nazarje
Brdo	Nova Gorica
Brdo	Slovenske Konjice
Brdo	Šentjur
Brdo	Tržič
Brebovnica	Gorenja Vas-Poljane
Brecljevo	Šmarje pri Jelšah
Breg ob Bistrici	Tržič
Breg ob Kokri	Preddvor
Breg ob Savi	Kranj
Breg pri Borovnici	Borovnica
Breg pri Dobu	Ivančna Gorica
Breg pri Golem Brdu	Brda
Breg pri Kočevju	Kočevje
Breg pri Komendi	Komenda
Breg pri Konjicah	Slovenske Konjice
Breg pri Litiji	Litija
Breg pri Polzeli	Polzela
Breg pri Ribnici na Dolenjskem	Ribnica
Breg pri Sinjem Vrhu	Črnomelj
Breg pri Temenici	Ivančna Gorica
Breg pri Zagradcu	Ivančna Gorica
Breg	Majšperk
Breg	Mežica
Breg	Sevnica
Breg	Žirovnica
Brege	Krško
Breginj	Kobarid
Brekovice	Žiri
Brengova	Cerkvenjak
Bresnica	Ormož
Brest	Ig
Brestanica	Krško
Brestje	Brda
Brestovec	Rogaška Slatina
Brestovica pri Komnu	Komen
Brestovica pri Povirju	Sežana
Brestrnica	Maribor
Breška Vas	Šentjernej
Breza	Trebnje
Brezen	Vitanje
Brezje nad Kamnikom	Kamnik
Brezje ob Slomu	Šentjur
Brezje pod Nanosom	Postojna
Brezje pri Bojsnem	Brežice
Brezje pri Dobjem	Dobje
Brezje pri Dobrovi	Dobrova-Polhov Gradec
Brezje pri Dobu	Domžale
Brezje pri Dovškem	Krško
Brezje pri Grosupljem	Grosuplje
Brezje pri Kumpolju	Litija
Brezje pri Lekmarju	Šmarje pri Jelšah
Brezje pri Lipoglavu	Ljubljana
Brezje pri Ločah	Slovenske Konjice
Brezje pri Oplotnici	Oplotnica
Brezje pri Podplatu	Rogaška Slatina
Brezje pri Poljčanah	Slovenska Bistrica
Brezje pri Raki	Krško
Brezje pri Rožnem Dolu	Semič
Brezje pri Senušah	Krško
Brezje pri Slovenski Bistrici	Slovenska Bistrica
Brezje pri Šentjerneju	Šentjernej
Brezje pri Trebelnem	Trebnje
Brezje pri Tržiču	Tržič
Brezje pri Veliki Dolini	Brežice
Brezje pri Vinjem Vrhu	Semič
Brezje v Podbočju	Krško
Brezje	Cerknica
Brezje	Mozirje
Brezje	Novo Mesto
Brezje	Radovljica
Brezje	Sveti Jurij ob Ščavnici
Brezje	Zagorje ob Savi
Brezni Vrh	Radlje ob Dravi
Breznica pod Lubnikom	Škofja Loka
Breznica pri Žireh	Žiri
Breznica	Prevalje
Breznica	Žirovnica
Breznik	Črnomelj
Breznik	Zagorje ob Savi
Brezno	Laško
Brezno	Laško
Brezno	Podvelka
Brezova Reber pri Dvoru	Žužemberk
Brezova Reber	Semič
Brezova	Celje
Brezovci	Dornava
Brezovci	Puconci
Brezovec - del	Lendava
Brezovec pri Polju	Podčetrtek
Brezovec pri Rogatcu	Rogatec
Brezovec	Gorišnica
Brezovi Dol	Ivančna Gorica
Brezovica na Bizeljskem	Brežice
Brezovica pri Borovnici	Borovnica
Brezovica pri Črmošnjicah	Semič
Brezovica pri Dobu	Domžale
Brezovica pri Gradinu	Koper
Brezovica pri Ljubljani	Brezovica
Brezovica pri Medvodah	Medvode
Brezovica pri Mirni	Mirna
Brezovica pri Predgradu	Kočevje
Brezovica pri Stopičah	Novo Mesto
Brezovica pri Trebelnem	Trebnje
Brezovica pri Zlatem Polju	Lukovica
Brezovica v Podbočju	Krško
Brezovica	Hrpelje-Kozina
Brezovica	Novo Mesto
Brezovica	Radovljica
Brezovica	Velika Polana
Brezovk	Brda
Brezovo Brdo	Hrpelje-Kozina
Brezovo	Litija
Brezovo	Sevnica
Brezovska Gora	Krško
Brezula	Rače-Fram
Breže	Ribnica
Brežec pri Divači	Divača
Brežec pri Podgorju	Koper
Brežice	Brežice
Brglez	Litija
Brič	Koper
Briga	Kostel
Brinje	Dol pri Ljubljani
Brinje	Trebnje
Brinovščica	Ribnica
Briše pri Polhovem Gradcu	Dobrova-Polhov Gradec
Briše	Kamnik
Briše	Zagorje ob Savi
Britof	Kranj
Brje pri Komnu	Komen
Brje pri Koprivi	Sežana
Brje	Ajdovščina
Brlog - del	Sodražica
Brlog - del	Velike Lašče
Brlog	Krško
Brnica	Hrastnik
Brnica	Žalec
Brod v Podbočju	Krško
Brod	Bohinj
Brode	Škofja Loka
Brode	Vransko
Brodnice	Laško
Brsnik	Kostel
Brstnik	Laško
Brstovec	Semič
Brstovnica	Laško
Bršlenovica	Lukovica
Bruhanja Vas	Dobrepolje
Bruna Vas	Trebnje
Brunk	Radeče
Brunška Gora	Radeče
Brunšvik	Starše
Brvace	Grosuplje
Brvi	Brežice
Buč	Kamnik
Buče	Kozje
Bučečovci	Križevci
Bučerca	Krško
Bučka	Škocjan
Bučkovci	Ljutomer
Budanje	Ajdovščina
Budganja Vas	Žužemberk
Budihni	Nova Gorica
Budinci	Šalovci
Budna Vas	Sevnica
Buje	Pivka
Bukošek	Brežice
Bukov Vrh nad Visokim	Škofja Loka
Bukov Vrh	Gorenja Vas-Poljane
Bukova Gora	Kočevje
Bukovca	Laško
Bukovci	Markovci
Bukovec pri Poljanah	Ribnica
Bukovec	Slovenska Bistrica
Bukovec	Velike Lašče
Bukovica pri Litiji	Litija
Bukovica pri Vodicah	Vodice
Bukovica	Ivančna Gorica
Bukovica	Nova Gorica
Bukovica	Ribnica
Bukovica	Škofja Loka
Bukovje pri Slivnici	Šentjur
Bukovje v Babni Gori	Šmarje pri Jelšah
Bukovje	Brežice
Bukovje	Postojna
Bukovlje	Zreče
Bukovnica	Moravske Toplice
Bukovo	Cerkno
Bukovska Vas	Dravograd
Bukovski Vrh	Tolmin
Bukovščica	Škofja Loka
Bukovžlak	Celje
Bunčani	Veržej
Bušeča Vas	Brežice
Bušinec	Dolenjske Toplice
Bušinja Vas	Metlika
Butajnova	Dobrova-Polhov Gradec
Butari	Koper
Butoraj	Črnomelj
