= Kal, Hrastnik =

Kal
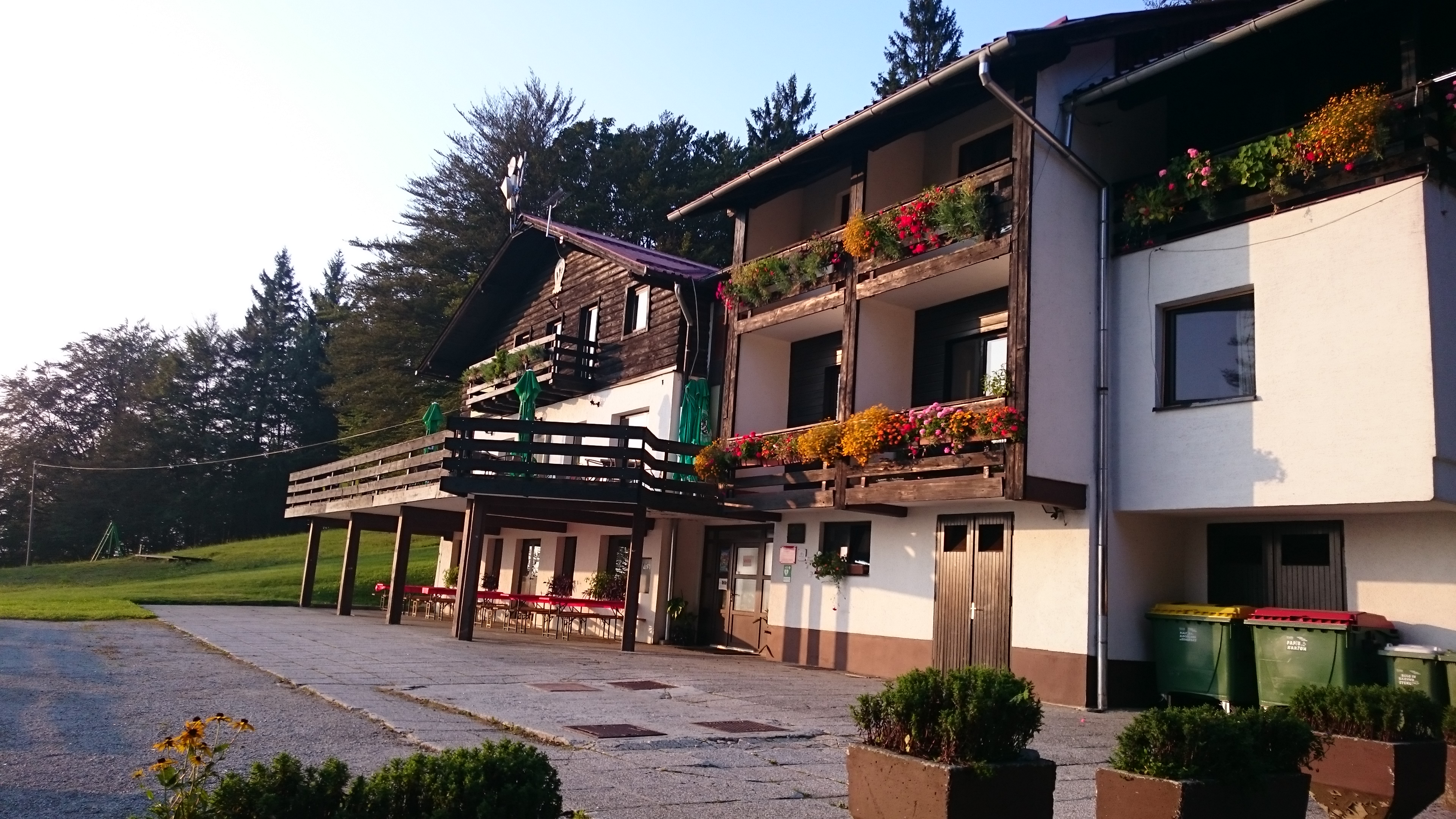
- Lodge in Kal

- Location in Slovenia
- Coordinates: 46°10′19.1″N 15°6′44.69″E
- Country: Slovenia
- Traditional region: Styria
- Statistical region: Central Sava
- Municipality: Hrastnik

Area
  - Total: 3.48 km^{2} (1.34 sq mi)
- Elevation: 880.6 m (2,889 ft)

Population (2002)
  - Total: 41
- Postal code: 1431

Kal (pronounced [ˈkaːu̯]) is a settlement in the Municipality of Hrastnik in central Slovenia. It lies in the hills north of Dol pri Hrastniku. The area is part of the traditional region of Styria. It is now included with the rest of the municipality in the Central Sava Statistical Region. Kal includes the hamlets of Spodnji Kal (or Mali Kal) and Veliki Kal.

== Geography ==
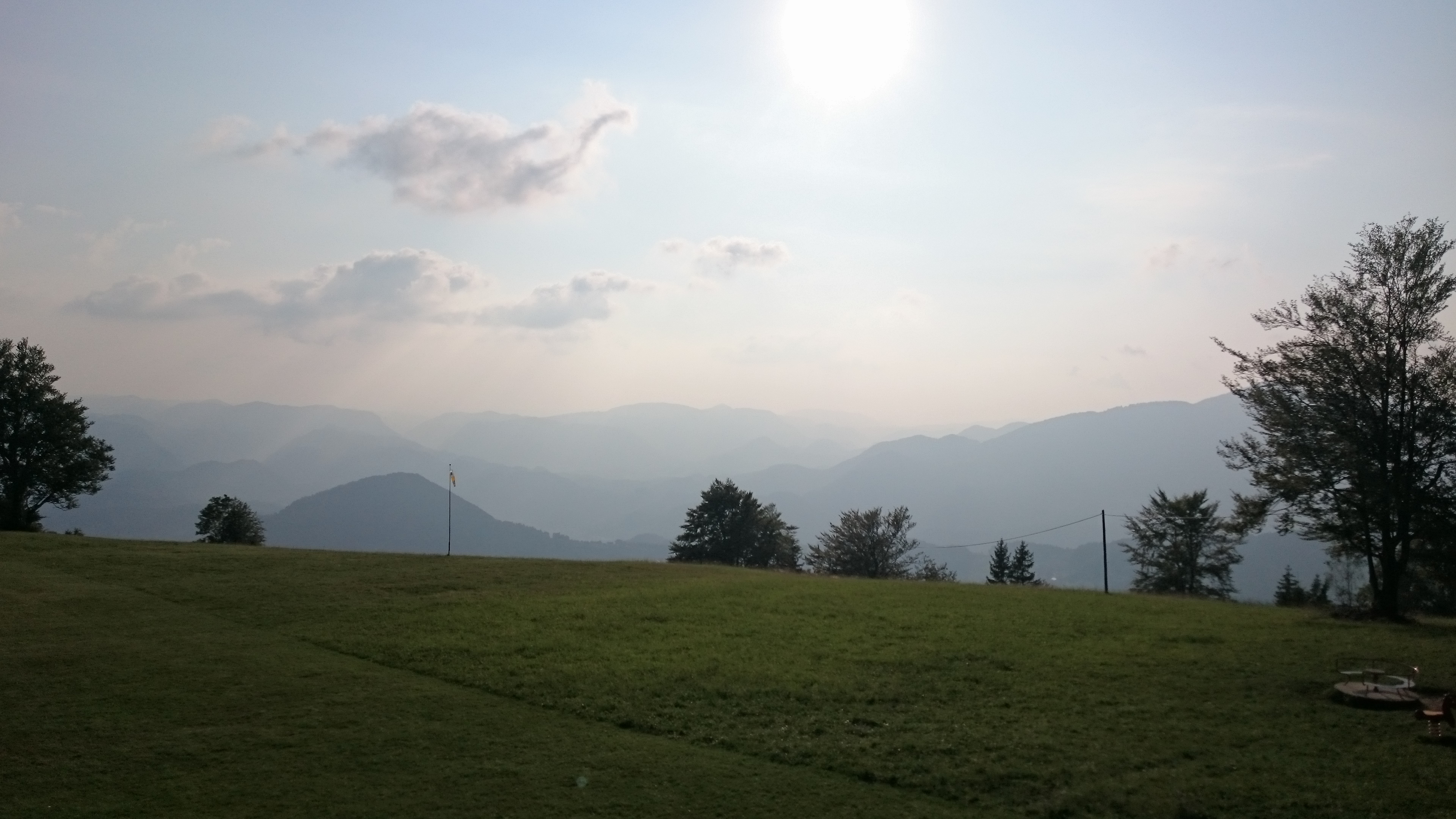
View from Kal Hill

Kal Hill (Slovene: Kalski hrib; 985 meters or 3,232 feet) stands on the northern edge of the settlement, and Pleše Hill (956 meters or 3,136 feet) and Long Peak (Slovene: Dolgi vrh; 918 meters or 3,012 feet) stand south of the village core. There is road access to the village via a steep road from Dol pri Hrastniku and a newer road from Čeče. The higher levels of the settlement stand on limestone, and at lower elevations shale, sandstone, and conglomerate rock are found. The soil is loamy and sensitive to droughts.

== History ==
The Kal area was settled relatively late. It was still uninhabited in the 13th century, but farms were attested in the area in the 16th century. A school was established in the settlement in 1908. Classes were initially held in a private home; after that building burned down, a school building was built in 1927. A mountain lodge was built on Kal Hill in 1948.

=== Mass grave ===
Kal is the site of a mass grave associated with the Second World War. The Paradise Valley Mass Grave (Slovene: Grobišče Rajska dolina) is located under a log cabin at the beginning of the Paradise Valley (Rajska dolina) ski lift. It contains the remains of 40 Slovenian families from Lower Carniola that were transported to the valley and murdered.
