= Marno =

- Location in Slovenia
- Coordinates: 46°8′38.59″N 15°8′13.02″E
- Country: Slovenia
- Traditional region: Styria
- Statistical region: Central Sava
- Municipality: Hrastnik

Area
  - Total: 1.51 km^{2} (0.58 sq mi)
- Elevation: 433 m (1,421 ft)

Population (2002)
  - Total: 216
- Postal code: 1431

Marno (pronounced [ˈmaːɾnɔ]) is a settlement in the Municipality of Hrastnik in central Slovenia. It lies just north of the main road east of Dol. The area is part of the traditional region of Styria. It is now included with the rest of the municipality in the Central Sava Statistical Region.

== Mass graves ==
Marno is the site of two known mass graves associated with the Second World War. The Marno Mass Grave (Slovene: Grobišče Marno) is located south of the settlement, on the edge of the woods about 150 meters (490 ft) from a chapel-shrine. The grave is believed to encompass the entire margin of the woods—from the road between Marno and Turje to the east, to the bottom of the valley with the creek to the west. The grave contains the remains of several hundred people (Home Guard soldiers and civilians) transported from the Teharje camp and murdered at the beginning of June 1945. The Krištandol Mass Grave (Grobišče Krištandol) is located northwest of the settlement, on a grassy slope below the house at Krištandol no. 15, 9 meters (30 ft) from a large tree and 32 meters (105 ft) from the edge of the woods. It contains an unknown number of victims.
