= Plesko =

- Location in Slovenia
- Coordinates: 46°8′39.14″N 15°4′15.37″E
- Country: Slovenia
- Traditional region: Styria
- Statistical region: Central Sava
- Municipality: Hrastnik

Area
  - Total: 0.69 km^{2} (0.27 sq mi)
- Elevation: 460.5 m (1,511 ft)

Population (2002)
  - Total: 41
- Postal code: 1430

Plesko (pronounced [ˈpleːskɔ]) is a small settlement in the Municipality of Hrastnik in central Slovenia. It lies in the hills between Hrastnik and Trbovlje. The area is part of the traditional region of Styria. It is now included with the rest of the municipality in the Central Sava Statistical Region.
