= Unično =

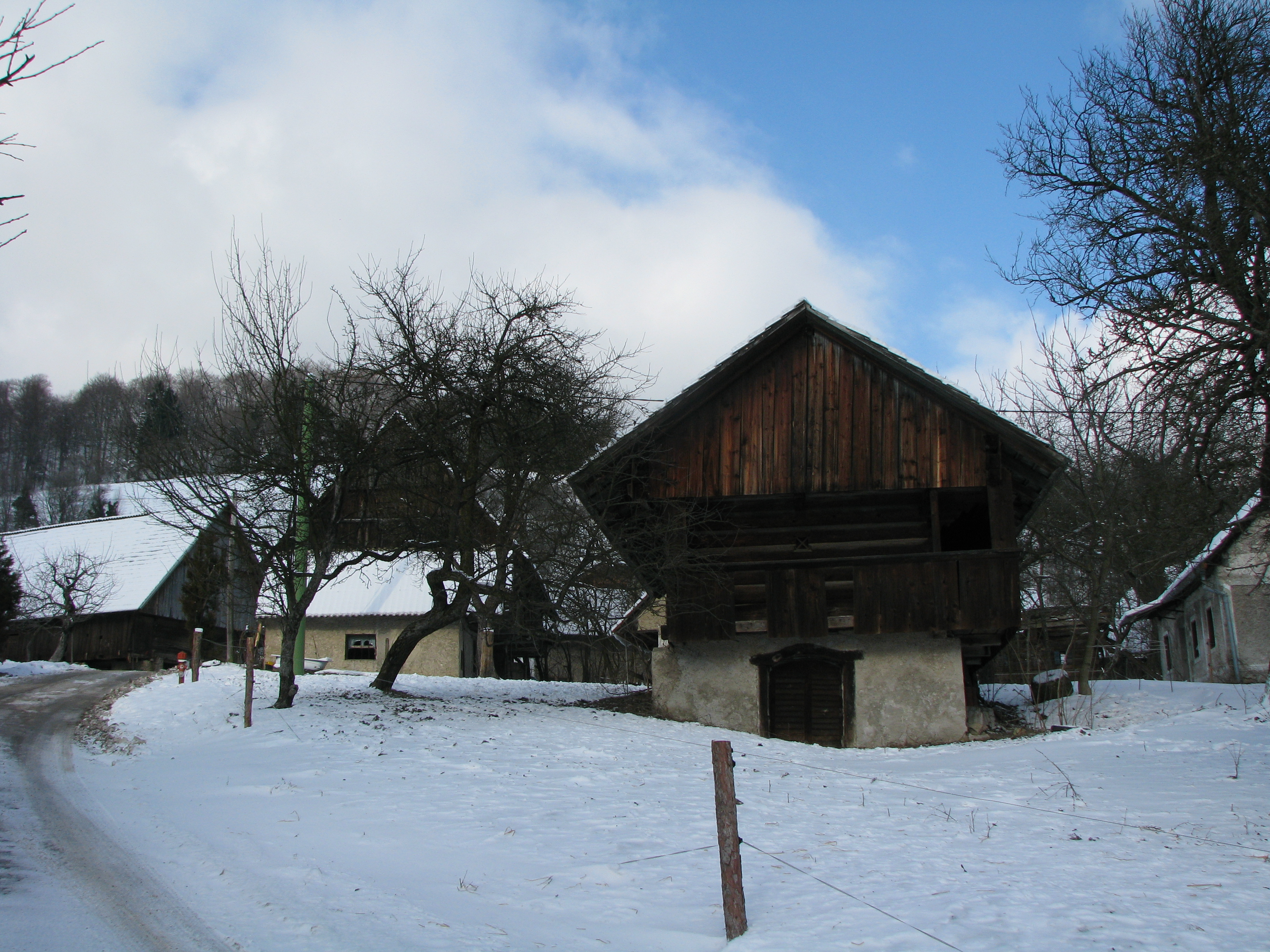
- Old buildings in Unično

- Location in Slovenia
- Coordinates: 46°8′57.68″N 15°8′35.91″E
- Country: Slovenia
- Traditional region: Styria
- Statistical region: Central Sava
- Municipality: Hrastnik

Area
  - Total: 0.92 km^{2} (0.36 sq mi)
- Elevation: 578.9 m (1,899 ft)

Population (2002)
  - Total: 14
- Postal code: 1431

Unično (pronounced [uˈniːtʃnɔ]) is a small settlement in the hills north of Brdce in the Municipality of Hrastnik in central Slovenia. The area is part of the traditional region of Styria. It is now included with the rest of the municipality in the Central Sava Statistical Region.
