= Prapretno pri Hrastniku =

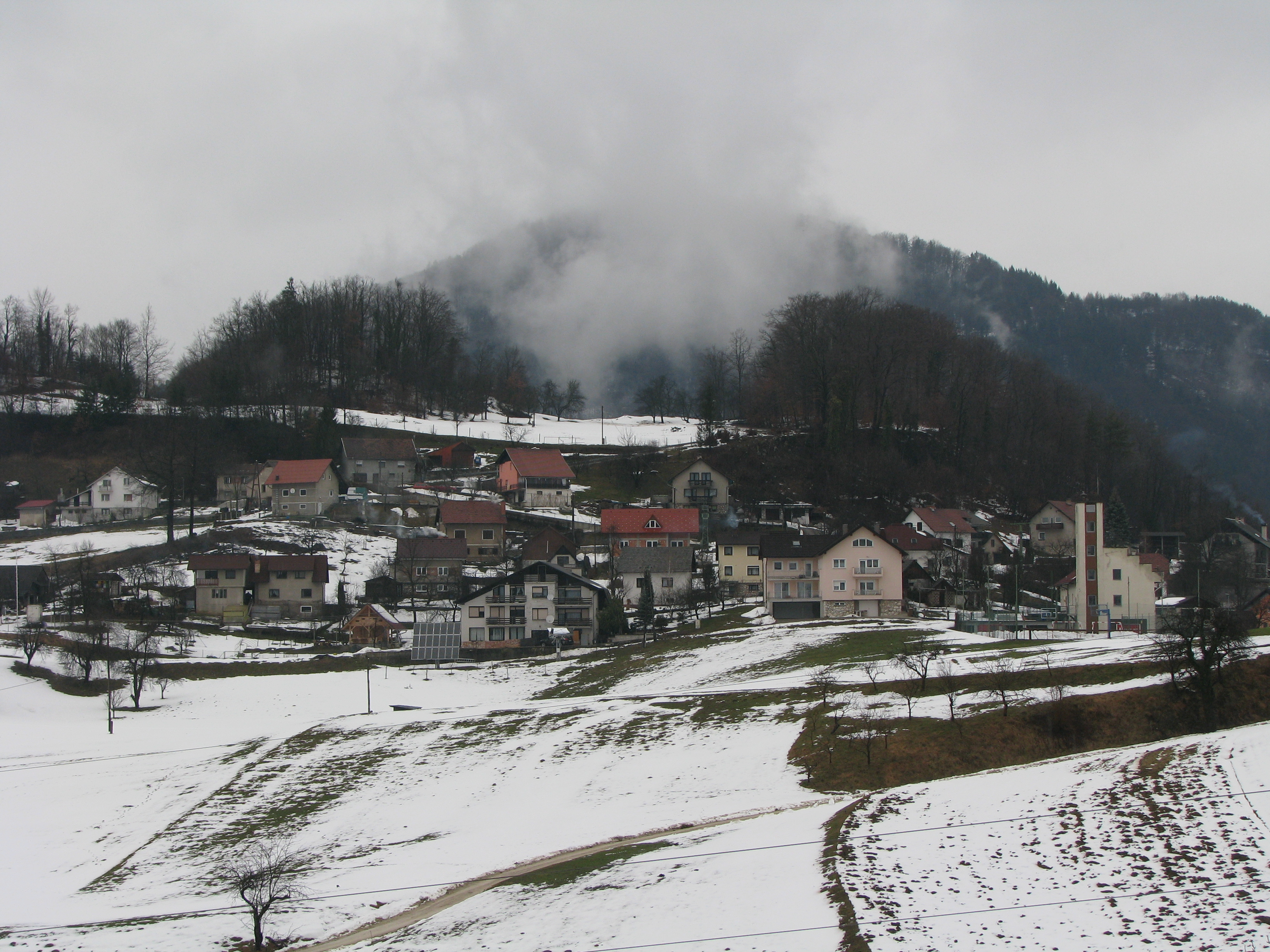

- Location in Slovenia
- Coordinates: 46°8′11.6″N 15°4′29.31″E
- Country: Slovenia
- Traditional region: Styria
- Statistical region: Central Sava
- Municipality: Hrastnik

Area
  - Total: 2.43 km^{2} (0.94 sq mi)
- Elevation: 383.1 m (1,257 ft)

Population (2002)
  - Total: 211
- Postal code: 1430

Prapretno pri Hrastniku (pronounced [ˈpɾaːpɾɛtnɔ pɾi ˈxɾaːstniku]) is a settlement in the Municipality of Hrastnik in central Slovenia. It lies in the hills immediately southwest of the town of Hrastnik. The area is part of the traditional region of Styria. It is now included with the rest of the municipality in the Central Sava Statistical Region.
