= Krištandol =

- Location in Slovenia
- Coordinates: 46°8′56.12″N 15°7′45.11″E
- Country: Slovenia
- Traditional region: Styria
- Statistical region: Central Sava
- Municipality: Hrastnik

Area
  - Total: 1.59 km^{2} (0.61 sq mi)
- Elevation: 456.2 m (1,497 ft)

Population (2002)
  - Total: 27
- Postal code: 1431

Krištandol (pronounced [ˈkɾiːʃtandɔu̯]) is a settlement in the Municipality of Hrastnik in central Slovenia. It lies in the hills northeast of Dol. The area is part of the traditional region of Styria. It is now included with the rest of the municipality in the Central Sava Statistical Region.
