= Studence, Hrastnik =

Studence
- Location in Slovenia
- Coordinates: 46°9′6.32″N 15°4′48.96″E
- Country: Slovenia
- Traditional region: Styria
- Statistical region: Central Sava
- Municipality: Hrastnik

Area
  - Total: 1.01 km^{2} (0.39 sq mi)
- Elevation: 380.7 m (1,249 ft)

Population (2002)
  - Total: 88
- Postal code: 1430

Studence (pronounced [stuˈdɛːntsɛ]) is a settlement in the Municipality of Hrastnik in central Slovenia. It lies in the hills immediately northwest of the town of Hrastnik. The area is part of the traditional region of Styria. It is now included with the rest of the municipality in the Central Sava Statistical Region.
