= Gore, Hrastnik =

Gore Sveti Jurij ob Turju (until 1955), Sankt Georgen (until 1919)
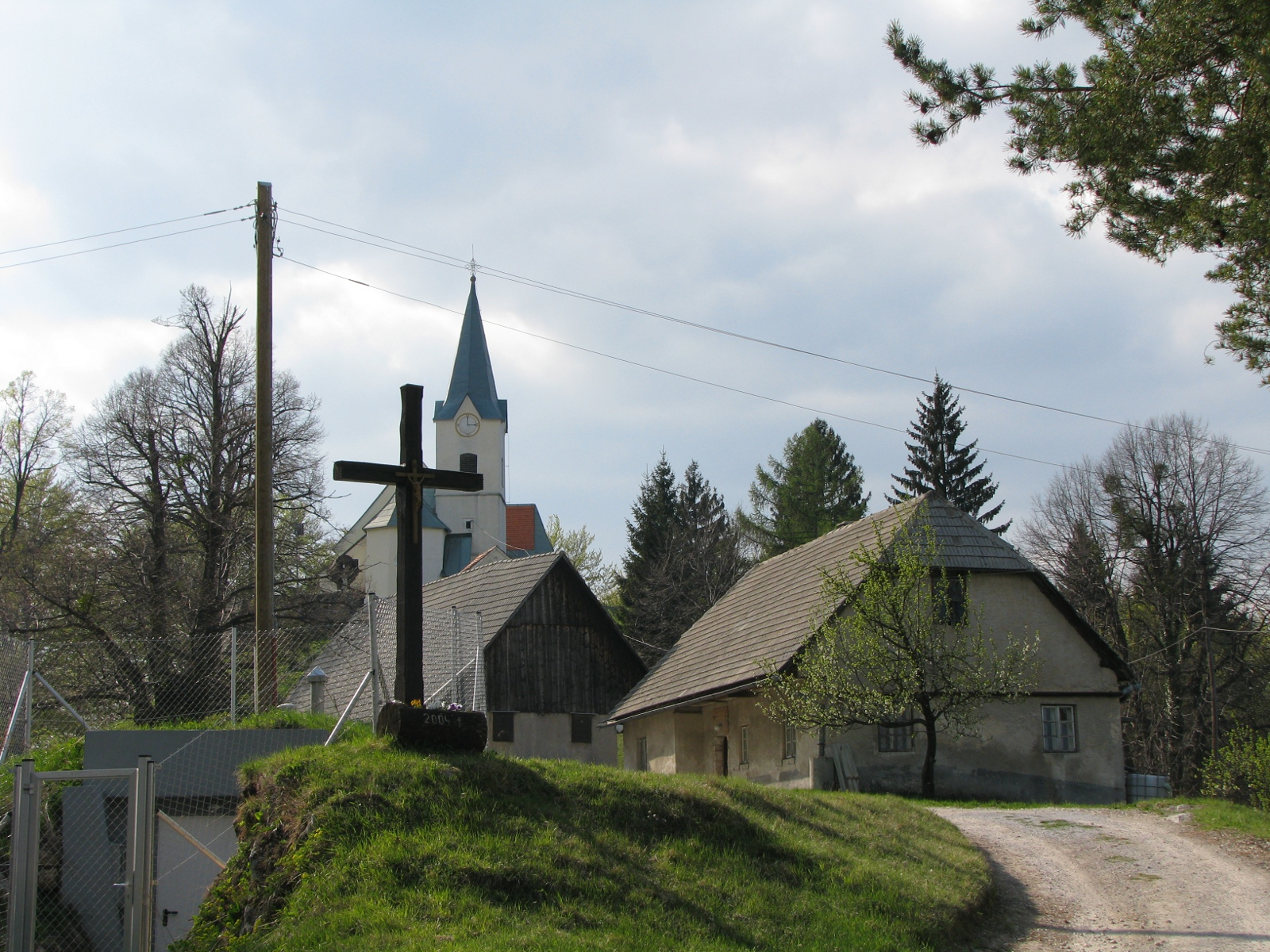
- Village with Saint George's Church

- Location in Slovenia
- Coordinates: 46°6′56.55″N 15°8′24.41″E
- Country: Slovenia
- Traditional region: Styria
- Statistical region: Central Sava
- Municipality: Hrastnik

Area
  - Total: 6.64 km^{2} (2.56 sq mi)
- Elevation: 742.6 m (2,436 ft)

Population (2002)
  - Total: 101
- Postal code: 1431

Gore (pronounced [ˈɡɔːɾɛ], German: Sankt Georgen) is a settlement in the Municipality of Hrastnik in central Slovenia. The area is part of the traditional region of Styria. It is now included with the rest of the municipality in the Central Sava Statistical Region.

== Name ==
The name of the settlement was changed from Sveti Jurij ob Turju (literally, 'Saint George next to Turje') to Gore (literally, 'mountains') in 1955. The name was changed on the basis of the 1948 Law on Names of Settlements and Designations of Squares, Streets, and Buildings as part of efforts by Slovenia's postwar communist government to remove religious elements from toponyms.

== Church ==
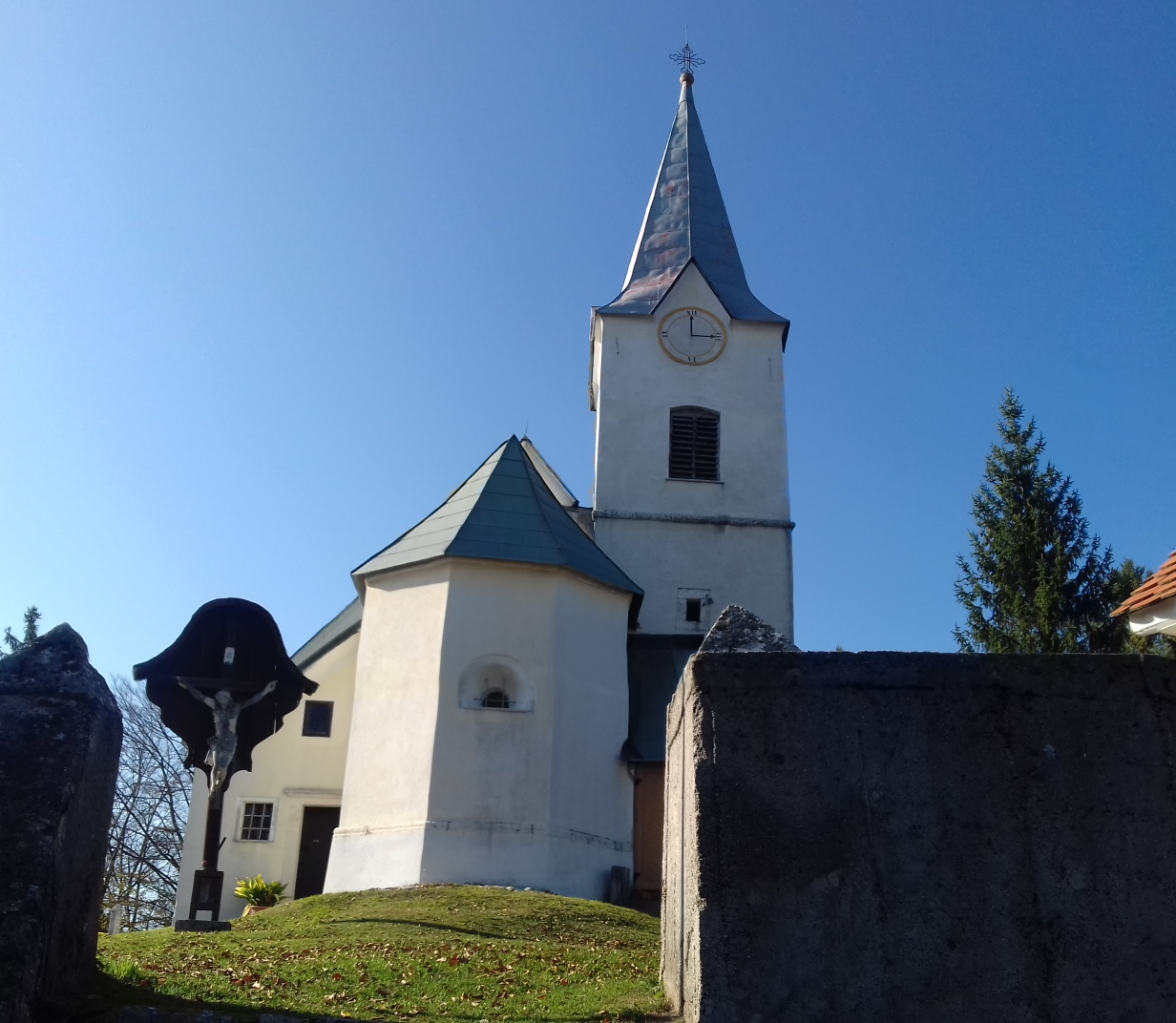
Saint George's Church in Gore

The local church is dedicated to Saint George (Slovene: sveti Jurij) and belongs to the Parish of Hrastnik. It dates to the early 16th century.
