= Kovk, Hrastnik =

Kovk
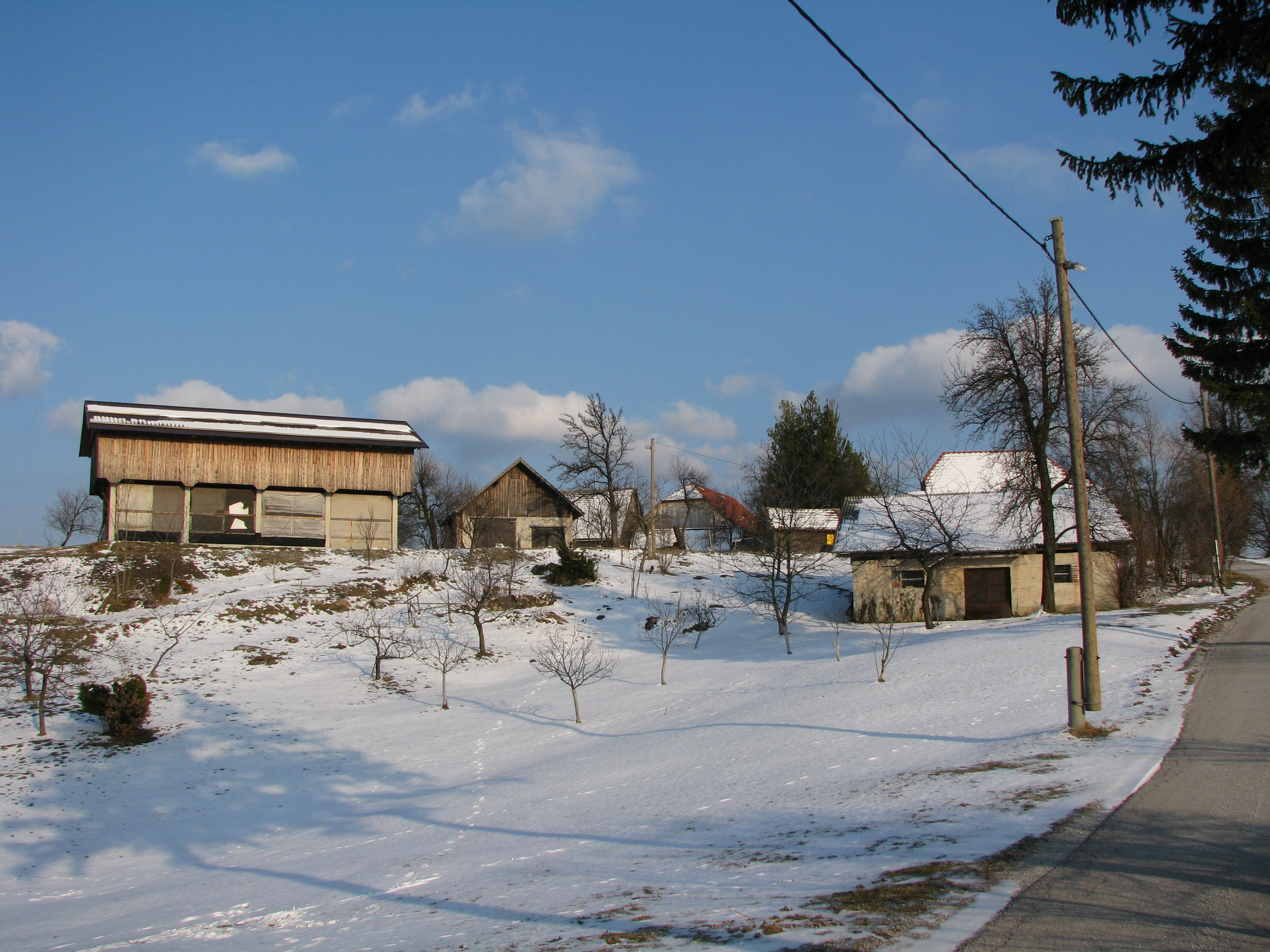

- Location in Slovenia
- Coordinates: 46°7′47.55″N 15°6′29.47″E
- Country: Slovenia
- Traditional region: Styria
- Statistical region: Central Sava
- Municipality: Hrastnik

Area
  - Total: 3.17 km^{2} (1.22 sq mi)
- Elevation: 613 m (2,011 ft)

Population (2002)
  - Total: 97
- Postal code: 1431

Kovk (pronounced [ˈkoːu̯k]) is a settlement in the Municipality of Hrastnik in central Slovenia. It lies in the hills south of Dol. The area is part of the traditional region of Styria. It is now included with the rest of the municipality in the Central Sava Statistical Region.
