= Zlokarje =

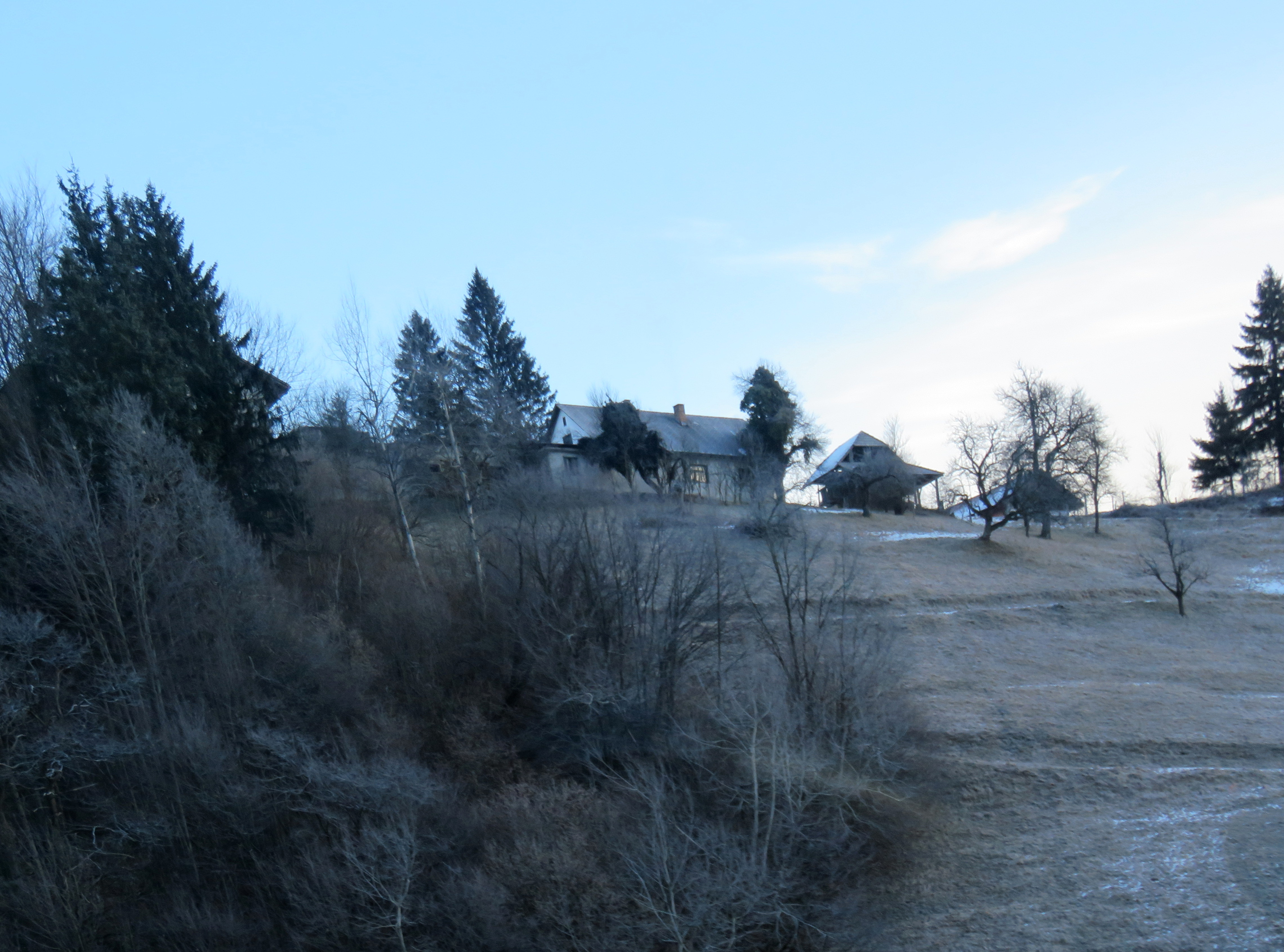

- Location in Slovenia
- Coordinates: 46°12′14″N 14°54′09″E
- Country: Slovenia
- Traditional region: Upper Carniola
- Statistical region: Central Sava
- Municipality: Zagorje ob Savi
- Elevation: 541 m (1,775 ft)

Zlokarje (pronounced [ˈzloːkaɾjɛ], in older sources Zlokarji) is a former village in central Slovenia in the Municipality of Zagorje ob Savi. It is now part of the village of Jelševica. It is part of the traditional region of Upper Carniola and is now included in the Central Sava Statistical Region.

== Geography ==
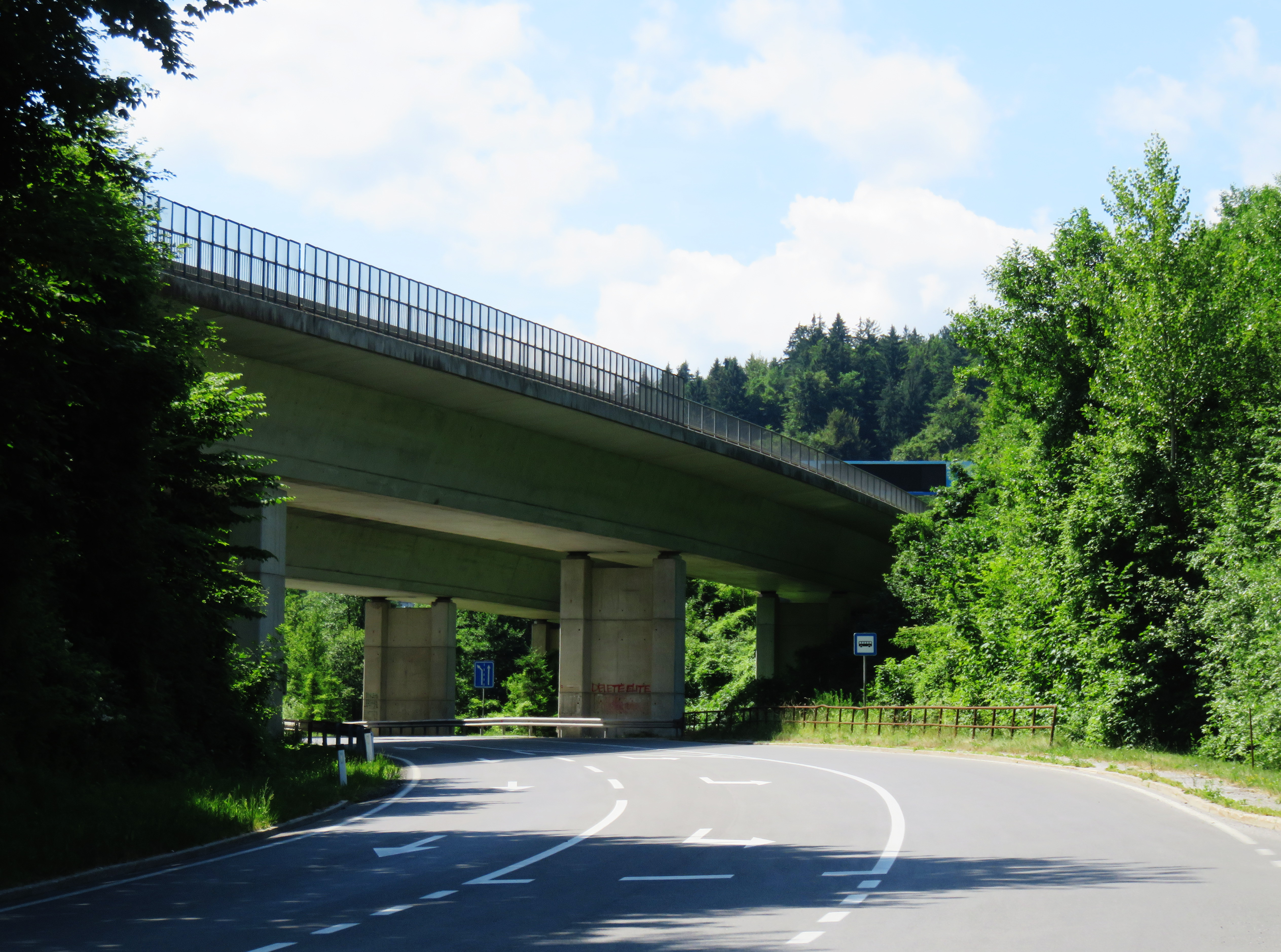
The Zlokarje Viaduct

Zlokarje is a clustered settlement in the northwestern part of the territory of Jelševica, consisting of two farms at the top of a hill. It lies at the extreme northwest end of a mountain ridge. The Zlokarje Viaduct (Slovene: viadukt Zlokarje) on Slovenia's A1 Freeway is named after Zlokarje and runs immediately west of the village; its right and left spans measure 204 meters (669 ft) and 222 meters (728 ft).

== History ==
Zlokarje had a population of 14 (in two houses) in 1900, 18 (in two houses) in 1931, and 17 (in two houses) in 1953. Zlokarje was annexed by Jelševica in 1953, ending its existence as a separate settlement.
