= Gorizia Statistical Region =

Coordinates: 46°03′00″N 13°53′00″E

Gorizia Statistical Region goriška statistična regija
- Statistical region
- Municipalities: 13
- Largest city: Nova Gorica

Area
  - Total: 2,325 km^{2} (898 sq mi)

Population (2020)
  - Total: 118,041
  - Density: 50.77/km^{2} (131.5/sq mi)

Statistics
  - Households: 46255
  - Employed: 39307
  - Registered unemployed: 5722
  - College/university students: 5136
  - Regional GDP (2019): EUR 2,443 bn (EUR 20,707 per capita)
- HDI (2022): 0.911 very high · 4th

The Gorizia Statistical Region (Slovene: goriška statistična regija) is a statistical region in western Slovenia, along the border with Italy. Like the Gorizia region (Slovene: Goriška), its name ultimately comes from the Italian town of Gorizia (the feminine adjective goriška is formed from the Slovenian name for Gorizia: Gorica).

The Julian Alps, the Soča River, and the Vipava Valley are the most prominent natural features of this region.

It contributed just over 5% to total national GDP in 2012, but in terms of GDP per capita it ranked fourth in the country. In the same year, disposable income per capita in the region was the highest, in second place behind the Central Slovenia Statistical Region. Housing stock estimates indicate that at the end of 2013 the region had the highest share of dwellings with three or more rooms (around 70%). The share of single-room dwellings was less than 10%. Dwellings here are larger than the Slovenian average, with 37 m^{2} of usable floor space per person on average. The number of cars per 1,000 population is also the highest in Slovenia, with an average of 100 cars more per 1,000 people than in the Central Sava Statistical Region. However, the cars here and in the Lower Sava Statistical Region are also the oldest (on average almost 10 years old in 2013).

The Gorizia Statistical Region is split between the traditional Slovene Littoral and Carniola regions.

== Cities and towns ==
The Gorizia Statistical Region includes six cities and towns, the largest of which is Nova Gorica.

Rank	Name	Population (2021)
1.	Nova Gorica	12,871
2.	Ajdovščina	6,922
3.	Idrija	5,831
4.	Šempeter pri Gorici	3,720
5.	Tolmin	3,274
6.	Bovec	1,671

== Municipalities ==
The Gorizia Statistical Region comprises the following 13 municipalities:

- Ajdovščina
- Bovec
- Brda
- Cerkno
- Idrija
- Kanal
- Kobarid
- Miren-Kostanjevica
- Nova Gorica
- Renče–Vogrsko
- Šempeter-Vrtojba
- Tolmin
- Vipava

== Demographics ==
The population in 2020 was 118,041. It has a total area of 2,325 km^{2}.

== Economy ==
Employment structure: 59% services, 37.8% industry, 3.2% agriculture.

=== Tourism ===
It attracts 9.8% of the total number of tourists in Slovenia, most being from Italy (41.5%) and Slovenia (20.7%).

== Transportation ==
- Length of motorways: 44.8 km
- Length of other roads: 3,149 km

== Sources ==
- Slovenian regions in figures 2014
