= Kovk =

Kovk may refer to two settlements in Slovenia, Central Europe:

- Kovk, Hrastnik in central Slovenia
- Kovk, Ajdovščina in western Slovenia
