= Podkraj, Hrastnik =

Podkraj
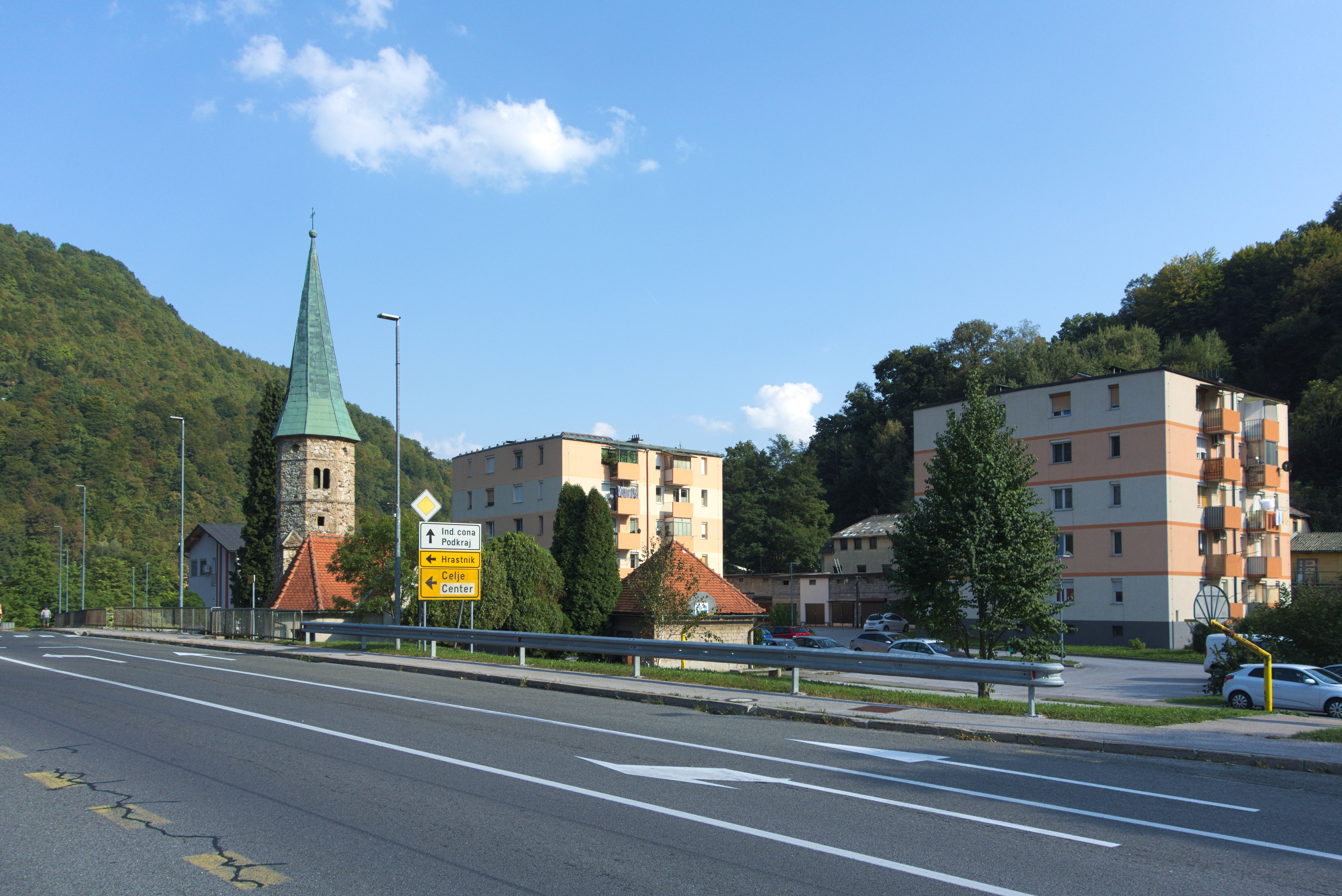

- Location in Slovenia
- Coordinates: 46°7′11.64″N 15°5′8.82″E
- Country: Slovenia
- Traditional region: Lower Carniola
- Statistical region: Central Sava
- Municipality: Hrastnik

Area
  - Total: 10.51 km^{2} (4.06 sq mi)
- Elevation: 221 m (725 ft)

Population (2002)
  - Total: 455
- Postal code: 1431

Podkraj (pronounced [pɔtˈkɾai̯]; German: Podkrai) is a settlement in the Municipality of Hrastnik in central Slovenia. It lies on the right bank of the Sava River. The area is part of the traditional region of Lower Carniola. It is now included with the rest of the municipality in the Central Sava Statistical Region. It includes the hamlets of Sava (German: Savadörfl), Koritnik, Strušce, Kladje, Ruda, Boriče, and Hribar.

== Church ==
The local church is dedicated to Saint Nicholas. It dates to the late 15th or early 16th century.

== Mass graves ==
Podkraj is the site of three known mass graves from the period immediately after the Second World War. The Boating Club Mass Grave (Slovene: Grobišče pri Brodarskem društvu) lies on the right bank of the Sava, about 100 meters (330 ft) east of the bridge near the Hrastnik Boating Club. It contains the remains of an unknown number of German soldiers that were murdered here in May 1945. The Sava Bridge Mass Grave (Grobišče pri mostu čez Savo) lies on the right bank of the Sava, about 100 meters (330 ft) west of the bridge, at the site of a wooden shed. It contains the remains of an unknown number of German soldiers that were murdered here in May 1945. The Gas Station Mass Grave (Grobišče pri bencinskem servisu) is located near the gas station west of Podkraj on the right bank of the Sava. It contains the remains of civilian refugees that were fleeing towards Austria at the end of the war, but were intercepted by the Yugoslav Army at Hrastnik and murdered.
