= Petkovna =

- Location in Slovenia
- Coordinates: 46°4′40″N 14°58′58″E
- Country: Slovenia
- Traditional region: Lower Carniola
- Statistical region: Central Sava
- Municipality: Litija
- Elevation: 744 m (2,441 ft)

Petkovna (Slovene pronunciation: [ˈpeːtkou̯na], sometimes Petkovina or Petkovine) is a former settlement in the Municipality of Litija in central Slovenia. It is now part of the village of Preveg. The area is part of the traditional region of Lower Carniola and is now included with the rest of the municipality in the Central Sava Statistical Region.

== Geography ==
Petkovna stands in the central part of the territory of Preveg, on a side road east of the village center.

== History ==
Petkovna had a population of 12 living in two houses in 1880. Petkovna was annexed by Preveg in 1953, ending its existence as a separate settlement.
