= Krnice, Hrastnik =

Krnice
- Location in Slovenia
- Coordinates: 46°7′8.65″N 15°6′41.04″E
- Country: Slovenia
- Traditional region: Styria
- Statistical region: Central Sava
- Municipality: Hrastnik

Area
  - Total: 1.59 km^{2} (0.61 sq mi)
- Elevation: 456.2 m (1,497 ft)

Population (2002)
  - Total: 114
- Postal code: 1430

Krnice (pronounced [kəɾˈniːtsɛ]) is a settlement in the Municipality of Hrastnik in central Slovenia. It lies in the hills above the left bank of the Sava River. The area is part of the traditional region of Styria. It is now included with the rest of the municipality in the Central Sava Statistical Region.
