= Šavna Peč =

- Location in Slovenia
- Coordinates: 46°6′44.31″N 15°7′27.09″E
- Country: Slovenia
- Traditional region: Styria
- Statistical region: Central Sava
- Municipality: Hrastnik

Area
  - Total: 2.11 km^{2} (0.81 sq mi)
- Elevation: 375.4 m (1,232 ft)

Population (2002)
  - Total: 98
- Postal code: 1430

Šavna Peč (pronounced [ˈʃaːu̯na ˈpeːtʃ], German: Schaunapetsch) is a settlement in the Municipality of Hrastnik in central Slovenia. The area is part of the traditional region of Styria. It is now included with the rest of the municipality in the Central Sava Statistical Region.

== Geography ==
Šavna Peč lies on a fertile plateau on the south (sunny) side of the hills, about 100 meters (330 ft) above the steep left bank of the Sava River. It is sheltered by a similar (partly rocky) slope above it.

== Notable people ==
Šavna Peč is the birthplace of Antón Sovrè, a Slovenian classical philologist, high school educator, and translator. There is a small museum in an old granary with a standing ethnology exhibition and some of Sovrè's works. The museum and the settlement are registered as a cultural heritage site.

The Sovrè Trail (Slovene: Sovrétova pot) leads from the valley below to the village, and a traditional commemorative hike has been held on it on every first Saturday in October since 2004.
