= Brezje, Zagorje ob Savi =

Brezje
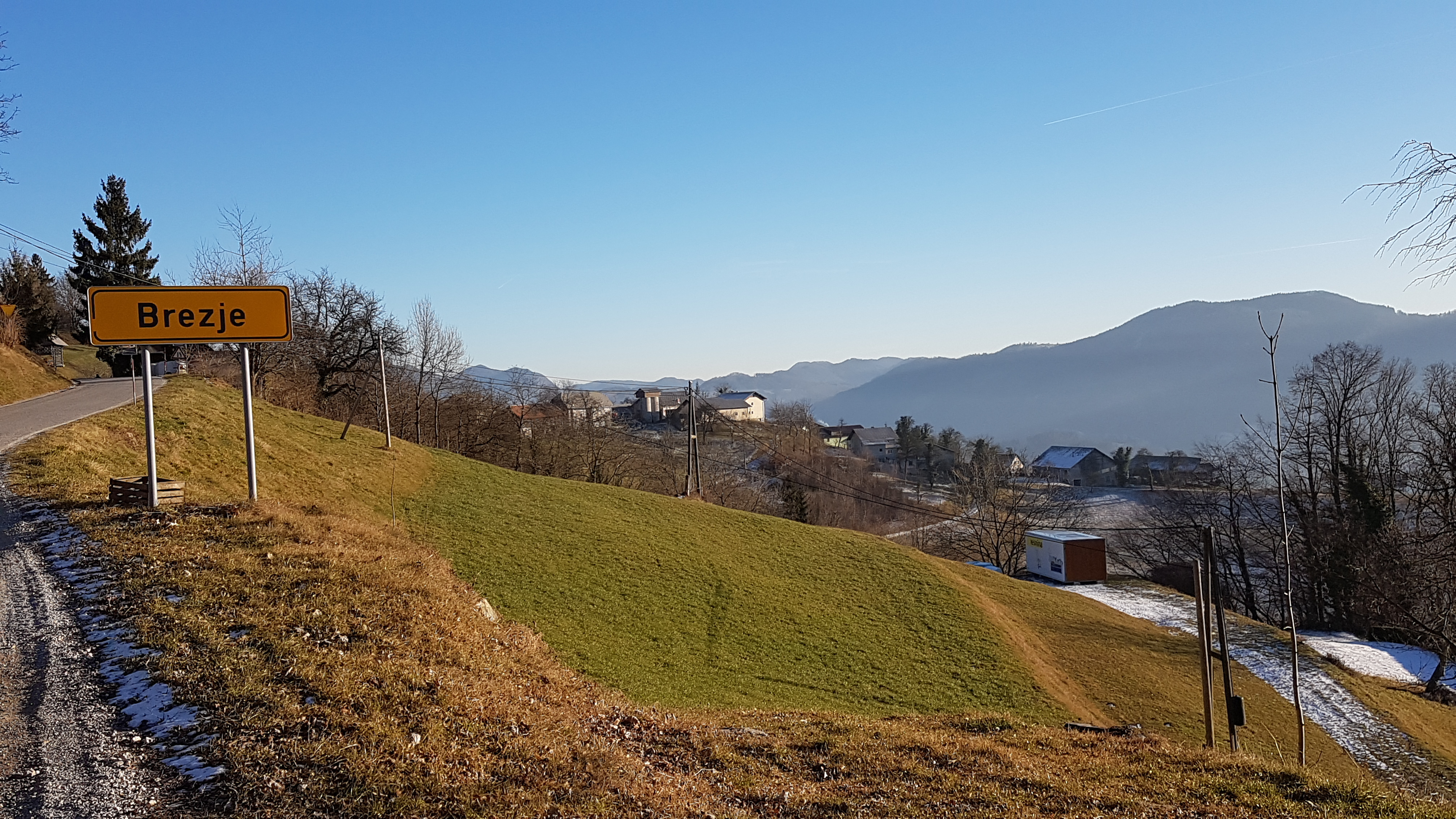
- Brezje seen from the northwest

- Location in Slovenia
- Coordinates: 46°10′43.84″N 14°55′28.62″E
- Country: Slovenia
- Traditional region: Upper Carniola
- Statistical region: Central Sava
- Municipality: Zagorje ob Savi

Area
  - Total: 2.26 km^{2} (0.87 sq mi)
- Elevation: 643.2 m (2,110 ft)

Population (2002)
  - Total: 143
- Postal code: 1413

Brezje (pronounced [ˈbɾeːzjɛ]) is a settlement north of Izlake in the Municipality of Zagorje ob Savi in central Slovenia. The area is part of the traditional region of Upper Carniola. It is now included with the rest of the municipality in the Central Sava Statistical Region.

== Name ==
Brezje was attested in written sources as Pirkch in 1433 and Bresya in 1485, among other spellings.

== Cultural heritage ==
A small Neo-Gothic chapel-shrine at the crossroads in the centre of the settlement is dedicated to the Virgin Mary. It dates to 1890 and was renovated in 1997.
