= Brezno, Laško =

Brezno
- Location in Slovenia
- Coordinates: 46°9′18.02″N 15°9′20.71″E
- Country: Slovenia
- Traditional region: Styria
- Statistical region: Savinja
- Municipality: Laško

Area
  - Total: 1.2 km^{2} (0.46 sq mi)
- Elevation: 437.4 m (1,435 ft)

Population (2002)
  - Total: 131
- Postal code: 3270

Brezno (pronounced [ˈbɾeːznɔ]) is a settlement in the Municipality of Laško in eastern Slovenia. It lies north of the main road from Rimske Toplice and Hrastnik. It is divided into Spodnje Brezno and Gornje Brezno (Upper and Lower Brezno). The area is part of the traditional region of Styria. It is now included with the rest of the municipality in the Savinja Statistical Region.
