= Brezovo, Litija =

Brezovo
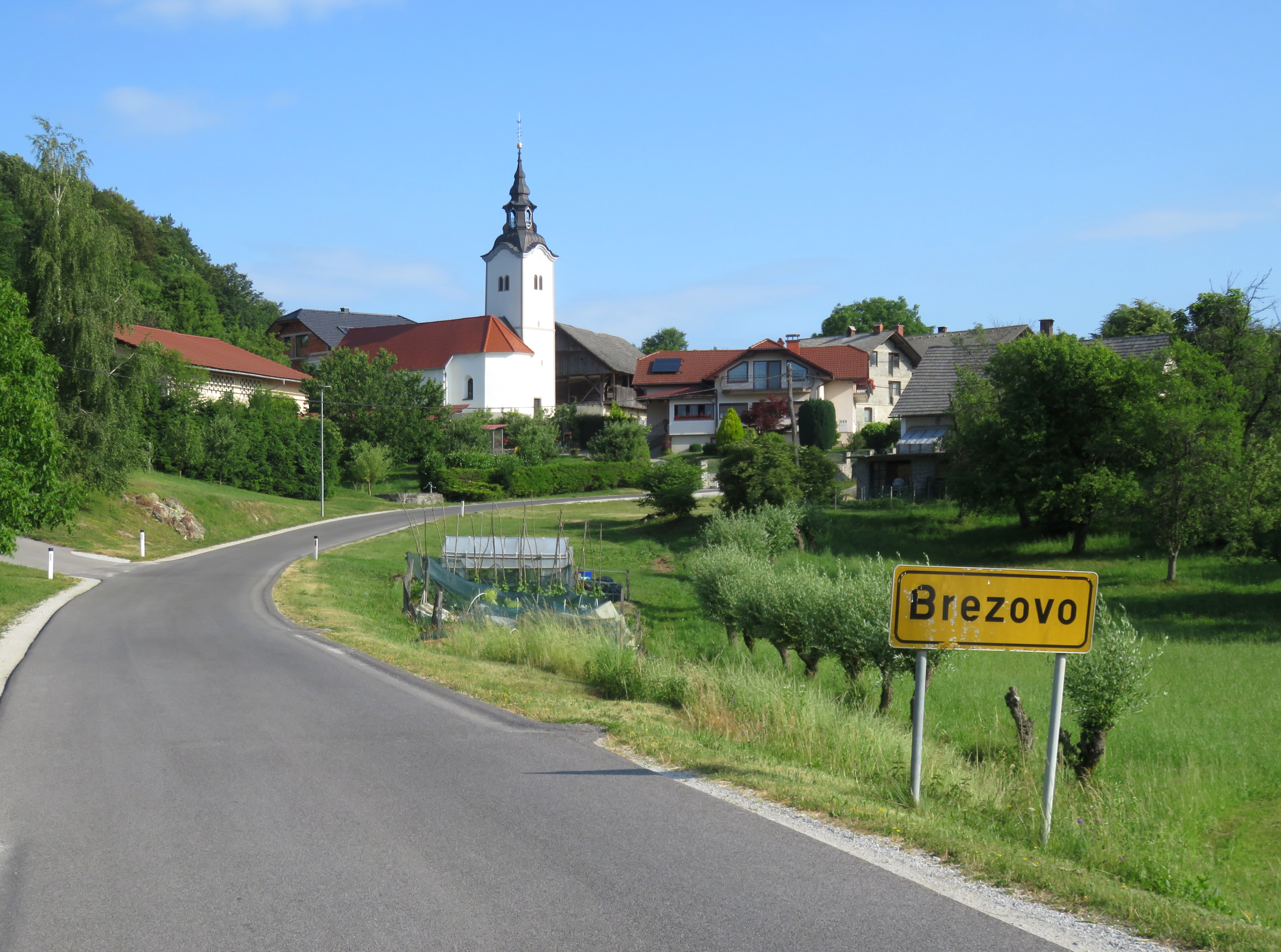

- Location in Slovenia
- Coordinates: 46°0′34.97″N 14°59′40.46″E
- Country: Slovenia
- Traditional region: Lower Carniola
- Statistical region: Central Sava
- Municipality: Litija

Area
  - Total: 4.65 km^{2} (1.80 sq mi)
- Elevation: 605.9 m (1,988 ft)

Population (2002)
  - Total: 54
- Postal code: 1274

Brezovo (pronounced [ˈbɾeːzɔʋɔ]) is a settlement in the Municipality of Litija in central Slovenia. The area is part of the traditional region of Lower Carniola. It is now included with the rest of the municipality in the Central Sava Statistical Region; until January 2014 the municipality was part of the Central Slovenia Statistical Region.

== Church ==
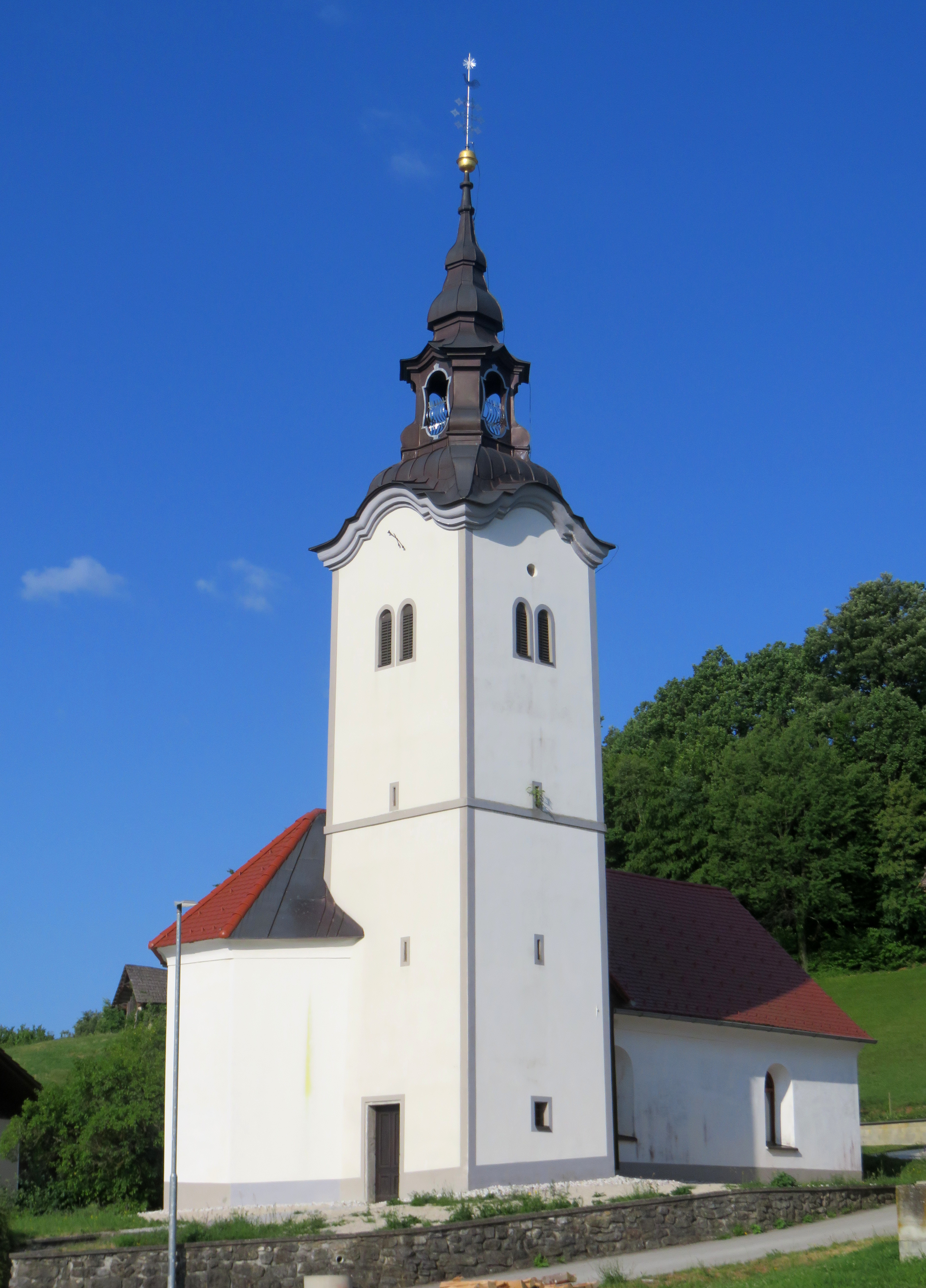
Saint Nicholas's Church

The local church is dedicated to Saint Nicholas and belongs to the Parish of Gabrovka. It was first mentioned in written documents dating to 1373. In 1850 its nave was extended and a belfry added.
