= Čeče =

Čeče Sveta Katarina (until 1955)
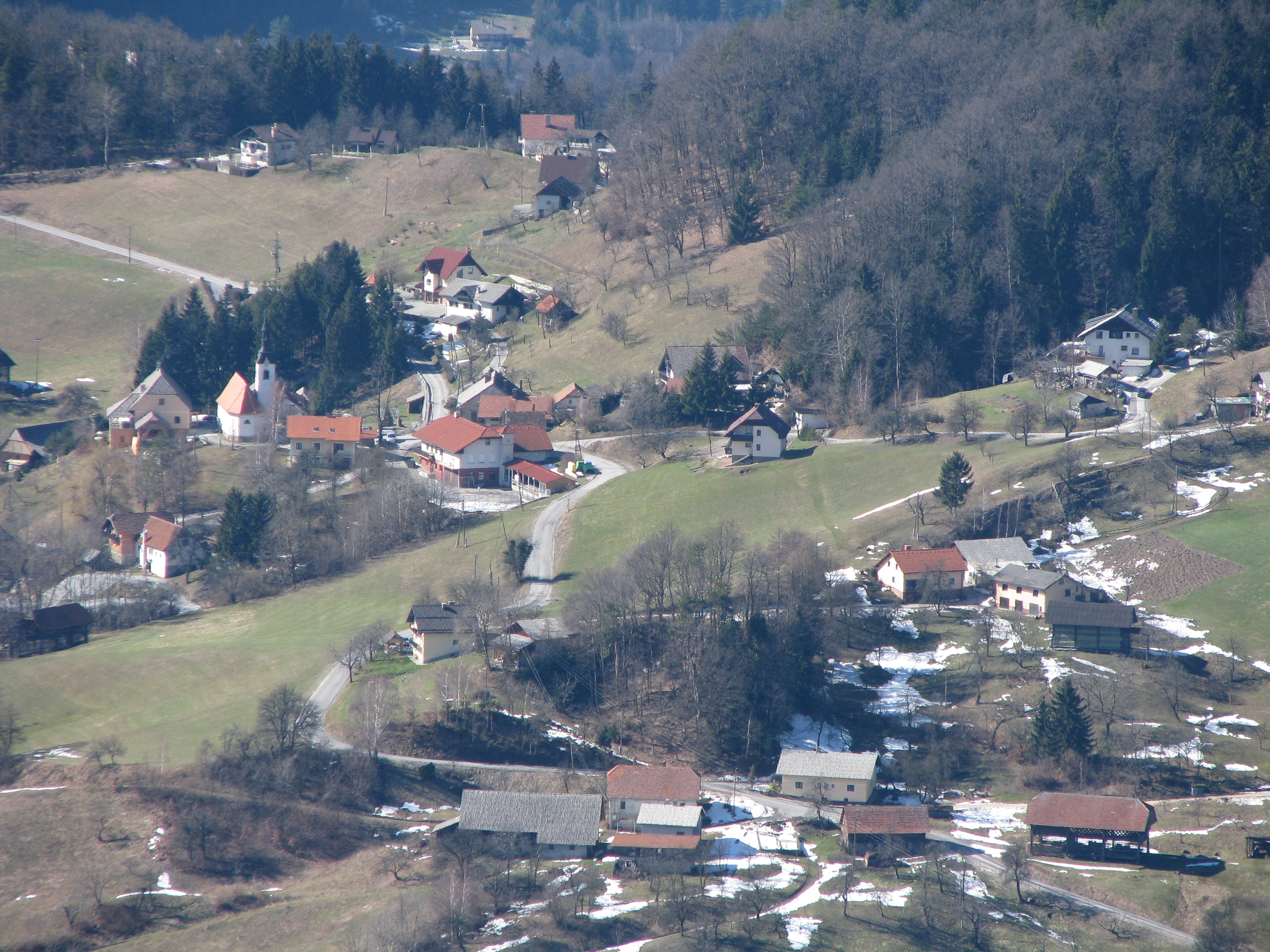

- Location in Slovenia
- Coordinates: 46°10′24.4″N 15°4′35.55″E
- Country: Slovenia
- Traditional region: Styria
- Statistical region: Central Sava
- Municipality: Trbovlje, Hrastnik

Area
  - Total: 3.82 km^{2} (1.47 sq mi)
- Elevation: 561.6 m (1,843 ft)

Population (2002)
  - Total: 303
- Postal code: 1420

Čeče (pronounced [ˈtʃeːtʃɛ]) is a settlement in central Slovenia. It lies in the hills northeast of the town of Trbovlje. Administratively it is divided between the municipalities of Trbovlje and Hrastnik. The area is part of the traditional region of Styria. It is now included in the Central Sava Statistical Region.

== Name ==
The name of the settlement was changed from Sveta Katarina (literally, 'Saint Catherine') to Čeče (literally, 'hayfields') in 1955. The name was changed on the basis of the 1948 Law on Names of Settlements and Designations of Squares, Streets, and Buildings as part of efforts by Slovenia's postwar communist government to remove religious elements from toponyms.

== Church ==
The local church is dedicated to Saint Catherine and belongs to the Parish of Trbovlje. It dates to the 17th century.
