= Janko Orožen =

Slovene historian and schoolteacher

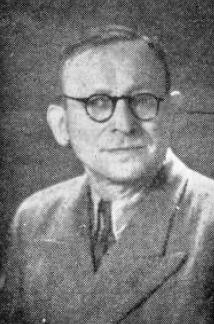
- Born: 10 December 1891; Sveti Štefan, Austria-Hungary
- Died: 30 September 1989 (aged 97); Celje, Yugoslavia
- Occupation: Historian
- Known for: Works on the history of Celje and the Central Sava Valley

Janko Orožen (pronounced [ˈjaːnkɔ ɔˈɾoːʒən]; 10 December 1891 – 30 September 1989) was a Slovene historian and schoolteacher.

== Life ==
Orožen was born in Sveti Štefan (now Turje), where he also attended a one-room school. He attended a teacher training school in Maribor and then graduated from high school in Celje. He enrolled in law school in Prague in 1913, but withdrew due to a lack of funds. During the First World War he was called up to serve in the Austro-Hungarian army in 1915 and was captured on the Russian front. He then joined the volunteers in the Czechoslovak Legion in 1918 and fought with them on the Macedonian front. In 1922 he graduated from the Faculty of Arts at the University of Ljubljana, after which he taught as a historian, Slavic specialist, and geographer in Murska Sobota, and then in Celje at the Celje First Grammar School from 1924 until 1941, when he was exiled to Serbia with his family. He taught in Užice and then temporarily went into retirement in 1942.

During the interwar period, Orožen wrote textbooks for history, geography, Russian, and Czech. Altogether he wrote 30 scholarly volumes, 170 articles and reports, and 12 textbooks. Orožen also studied the history of Celje and the Savinja and Sava valleys. After the Second World War, he returned to Celje in 1946 and taught at a high school there until his retirement in 1954. Following the major flood in the town that year, he dedicated himself to work at the Celje Historical Archives and served as director of the archives until his retirement in 1965.

== Family ==
Orožen's daughter Božena Orožen is a Slavic specialist, Russian specialist, literary historian, and journalist.

== Works ==
- Zgodovina Celja I. Prazgodovinska in rimska Celeja (History of Celje I. Prehistoric and Roman Celje), 1927.
- Zgodovina Celja II. Srednjeveško Celje (History of Celje II. Medieval Celje), 1927.
- Zgodovina Celja III. Novoveško Celje (1456–1848) (History of Celje III. Celje in the Modern Era, 1456–1848), 1930.
- Gradovi in graščine v narodnem izročilu (Castles and Manors in Folk Heritage), 1936. A collection of folk heritage gathered with the help of his students in various localities between the Savinja, Sotla, and Sava rivers.
