= Turje, Hrastnik =

Turje Sveti Štefan (until 1955)
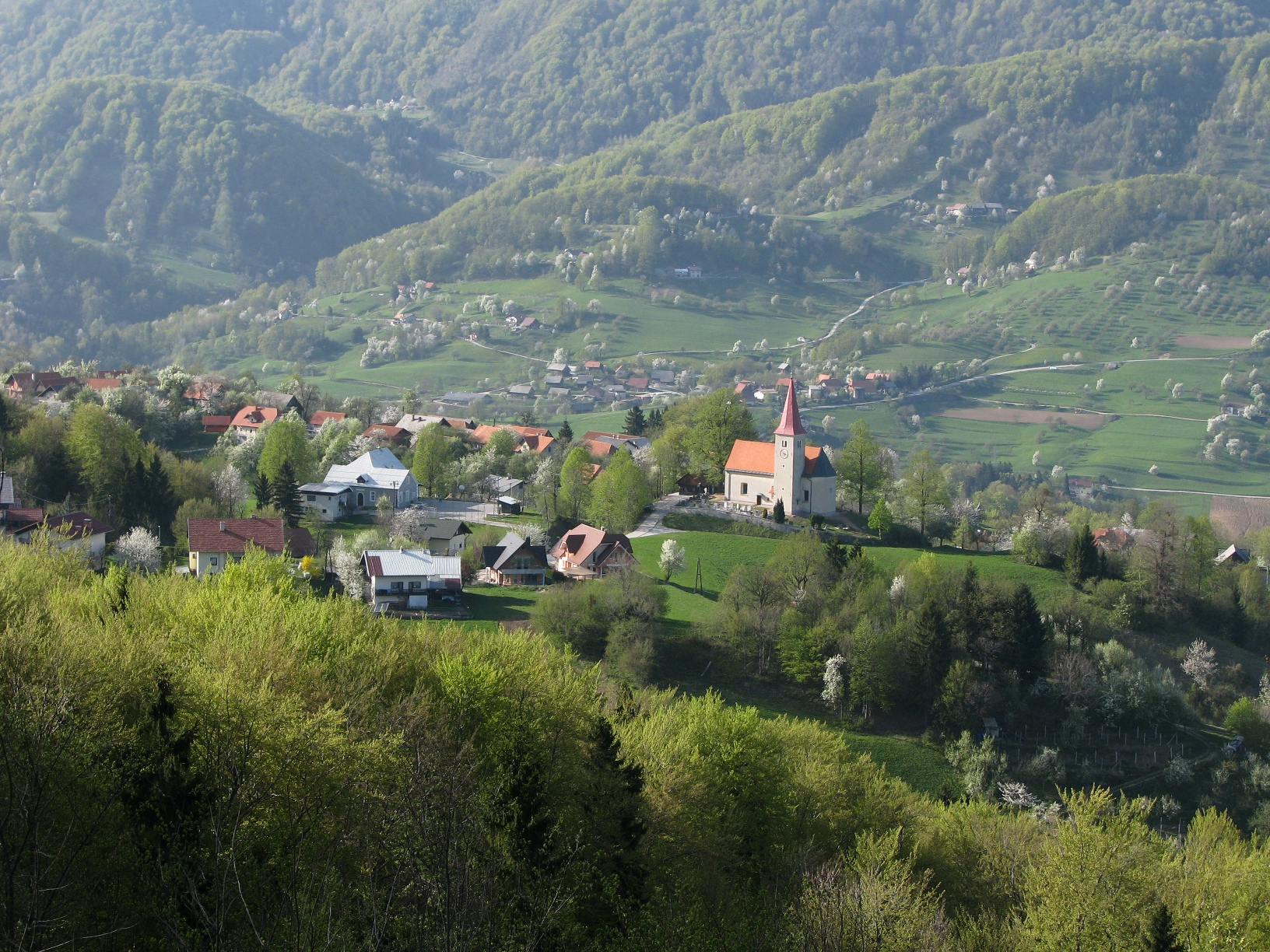
- Village of Turje with Saint Stephen's Church

- Location in Slovenia
- Coordinates: 46°7′48.65″N 15°9′3.68″E
- Country: Slovenia
- Traditional region: Styria
- Statistical region: Central Sava
- Municipality: Hrastnik

Area
  - Total: 5 km^{2} (1.9 sq mi)
- Elevation: 567.4 m (1,862 ft)

Population (2002)
  - Total: 273
- Postal code: 1431

Turje (pronounced [ˈtuːɾjɛ]) is a settlement in the hills southeast of Dol in the Municipality of Hrastnik in central Slovenia. The area is part of the traditional region of Styria. It is now included with the rest of the municipality in the Central Sava Statistical Region.

== Name ==
The name of the settlement was changed from Sveti Štefan (literally, 'Saint Stephen') to Turje in 1955. The name was changed on the basis of the 1948 Law on Names of Settlements and Designations of Squares, Streets, and Buildings as part of efforts by Slovenia's postwar communist government to remove religious elements from toponyms.

== Church ==
The parish church in the settlement is dedicated to Saint Stephen and belongs to the Parish of Dol pri Hrastniku.

== Notable people ==
Notable people that were born or lived in Turje include:

- Janko Orožen (1891–1989), historian
