= List of Slovenian regions by Human Development Index =

This is a list of Slovenian statistical regions by Human Development Index as of 2023.

Rank	Region	HDI (2023)
Very high human development
1	Central Slovenia	0.968
2	Coastal–Karst	0.932
–	Slovenia	0.931
3	Upper Carniola	0.924
4	Gorizia	0.916
5	Southeast Slovenia	0.909
6	Savinja	0.907
7	Drava	0.902
8	Carinthia	0.897
9	Lower Sava	0.893
10	Littoral–Inner Carniola	0.892
11	Mura	0.872
12	Central Sava	0.853
