= Benečija, Trebnje =

Benečija
- Location in Slovenia
- Coordinates: 45°54′21.49″N 14°59′30.74″E
- Country: Slovenia
- Traditional region: Lower Carniola
- Statistical region: Southeast Slovenia
- Municipality: Trebnje

Area
  - Total: 1.13 km^{2} (0.44 sq mi)
- Elevation: 274.5 m (901 ft)

Population (2002)
  - Total: 32

Benečija (pronounced [bɛnɛˈtʃiːja]) is a settlement in the Municipality of Trebnje in eastern Slovenia. It lies on the right bank of the Temenica River, just southwest of Trebnje. The area is part of the traditional region of Lower Carniola. The municipality is now included in the Southeast Slovenia Statistical Region.

Iron Age and Roman-period artefacts have been found at sites near the settlement.
