= Municipality of Hrastnik =

Municipality of Slovenia

Municipality of Hrastnik Občina Hrastnik
- Municipality
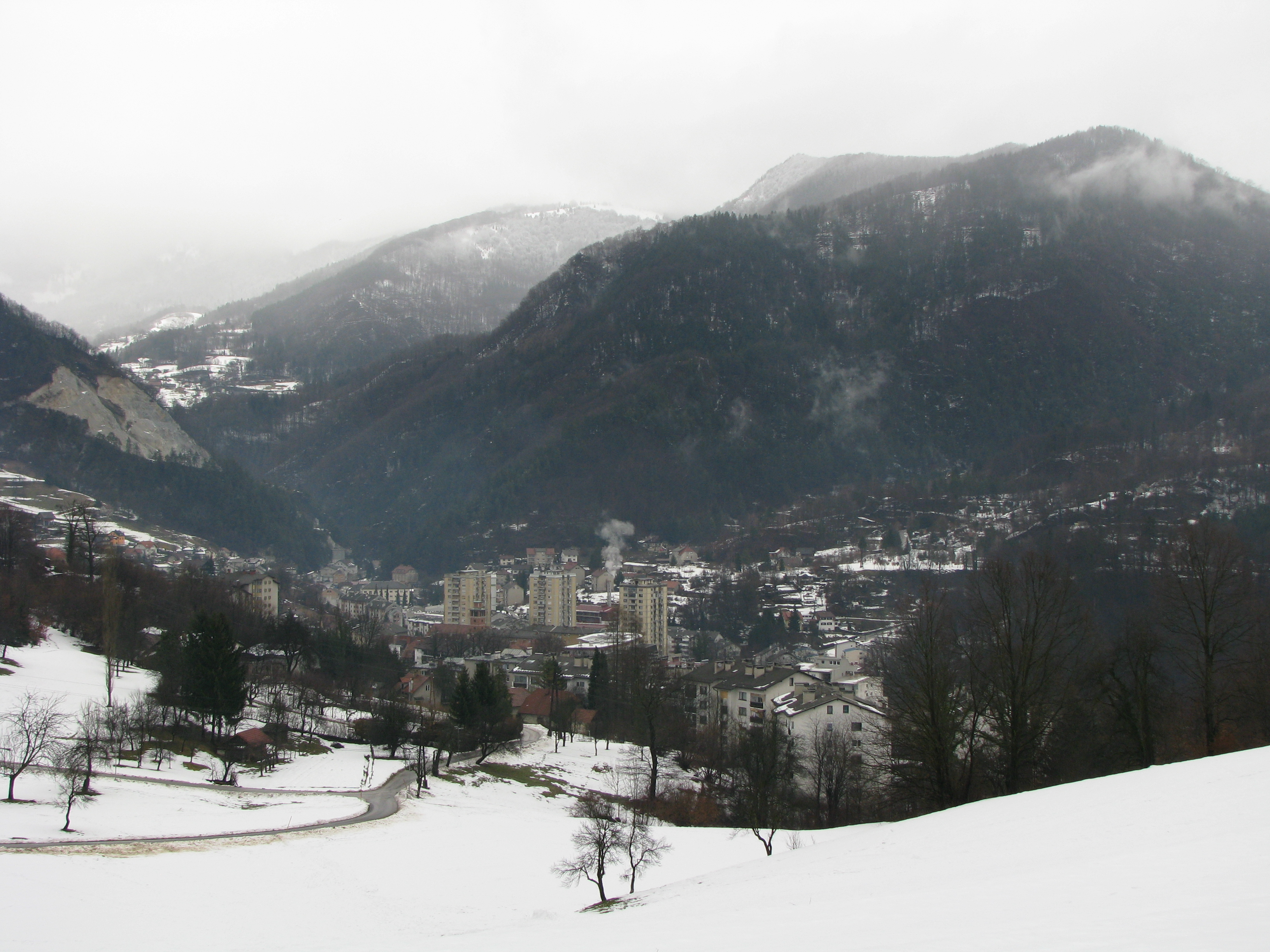

- Location of the Municipality of Hrastnik in Slovenia
- Coordinates: 46°08′N 15°06′E
- Country: Slovenia

Government
  - Mayor: Marko Funkl (Independent)

Area
  - Total: 58.6 km^{2} (22.6 sq mi)

Population (2002)
  - Total: 10,121
  - Density: 173/km^{2} (447/sq mi)
- Time zone: UTC+01 (CET)
  - Summer (DST): UTC+02 (CEST)
- Website: www.hrastnik.si

The Municipality of Hrastnik (pronounced [ˈxɾaːstnik]; Slovene: Občina Hrastnik) is a municipality in central Slovenia. The seat of the municipality is the town of Hrastnik. The area is part of the traditional Styria region. The entire municipality is now included in the Central Sava Statistical Region.

Located in the valley of a minor left bank tributary of the Sava River, the area is known for its rich deposits of coal. Coal mining began in the area in 1804. Surrounding peaks include Mount Kum (1220 m), Mount Mrzlica (1122 m), and Kopitnik Hill (910 m). The area around Kopitnik is protected as a nature reserve. Species such as the capercaillie and chamois run wild in the surrounding forests.

== Settlements ==
In addition to the municipal seat of Hrastnik, the municipality also includes the following settlements:

- Boben
- Brdce
- Brnica
- Čeče
- Dol pri Hrastniku
- Gore
- Kal
- Kovk
- Krištandol
- Krnice
- Marno
- Plesko
- Podkraj
- Prapretno pri Hrastniku
- Šavna Peč
- Studence
- Turje
- Unično
