= Brdce, Hrastnik =

Brdce
- Location in Slovenia
- Coordinates: 46°8′37.57″N 15°8′54.96″E
- Country: Slovenia
- Traditional region: Styria
- Statistical region: Central Sava
- Municipality: Hrastnik

Area
  - Total: 1.72 km^{2} (0.66 sq mi)
- Elevation: 397.7 m (1,305 ft)

Population (2002)
  - Total: 281
- Postal code: 1431

Brdce (pronounced [ˈbəɾtsɛ]) is a settlement in the Municipality of Hrastnik in central Slovenia. The area is part of the traditional region of Styria. It is now included with the rest of the municipality in the Central Sava Statistical Region.
