= Southeast Slovenia Statistical Region =

Coordinates: 45°39′00″N 15°00′00″E

Southeast Slovenia Statistical Region statistična regija jugovzhodna Slovenija
- Statistical region
- Municipalities: 21
- Largest city: Novo Mesto

Area
  - Total: 2,675 km^{2} (1,033 sq mi)

Population (2020)
  - Total: 145,357
  - Density: 54.34/km^{2} (140.7/sq mi)

Statistics
  - Households: 53499
  - Employed: 51247
  - Registered unemployed: 9224
  - College/university students: 6077
  - Regional GDP (2019): EUR 3,341 bn (EUR 23,096 per capita)
- HDI (2022): 0.905 very high · 5th

The Southeast Slovenia Statistical Region (Slovene: statistična regija jugovzhodna Slovenija) is a statistical region in southeast Slovenia. It is the largest statistical region. The development of this region is largely the result of industry (the auto industry, pharmaceuticals, and other light industry), which generated nearly half of the gross value added in the region in 2012. According to the latest available data for 2013, 94% of waste water in the region was treated before it was discharged from the public sewage system. This is significantly more than in Slovenia as a whole (78%). The expenditure on research and development (R&D), which amounted to 5.2% of the regional GDP in 2012, highlights the importance of R&D in the region. Businesses accounted for 90% of the sources of financing. The population's age structure in this region is favourable. In mid-2013 the value of the ageing index was 105.2, which means that the ratio between the population 65 or older and the population 15 or less was 105 older people per 100 young people.

== Cities and towns ==
The Southeast Slovenia Statistical Region includes six cities and towns, the largest of which is Novo mesto.

Rank	Name	Population (2021)
1.	Novo mesto	23,878
2.	Kočevje	8,113
3.	Črnomelj	5,451
4.	Trebnje	3,858
5.	Ribnica	3,671
6.	Metlika	3,226

== Municipalities ==
The Southeast Slovenia Statistical Region comprises the following 21 municipalities:

- Črnomelj
- Dolenjske Toplice
- Kočevje
- Kostel
- Loški Potok
- Metlika
- Mirna
- Mirna Peč
- Mokronog-Trebelno
- Novo Mesto
- Osilnica
- Ribnica
- Semič
- Šentjernej
- Šentrupert
- Škocjan
- Šmarješke Toplice
- Sodražica
- Straža
- Trebnje
- Žužemberk

== Demographics ==
The population in 2020 was 145,357. It has a total area of 2,675 km^{2}.

== Economy ==
Employment structure: 43.4% services, 52.6% industry, 4% agriculture.

=== Tourism ===
It attracts only 3.3% of the total number of tourists in Slovenia, most being from Slovenia (52.8%).

== Transportation ==
- Length of motorways: 52.7 km
- Length of other roads: 3603.1 km

== Sources ==
- Slovenian regions in figures 2014
