= Dol pri Hrastniku =

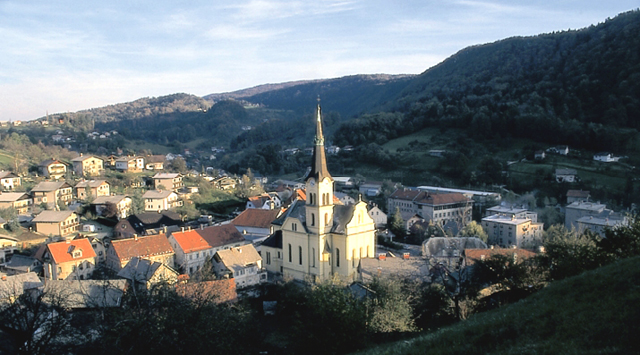

- Location in Slovenia
- Coordinates: 46°8′32.84″N 15°7′1.25″E
- Country: Slovenia
- Traditional region: Styria
- Statistical region: Central Sava
- Municipality: Hrastnik

Area
  - Total: 4.6 km^{2} (1.8 sq mi)
- Elevation: 331.3 m (1,087 ft)

Population (2002)
  - Total: 1,493
- Postal code: 1431

Dol pri Hrastniku (pronounced [ˈdoːu̯ pɾi ˈxɾaːstniku]) is a settlement in the Municipality of Hrastnik in central Slovenia. The area is part of the traditional region of Styria. It is now included with the rest of the municipality in the Central Sava Statistical Region. In addition to the main settlement, it includes the hamlets of Črdenc, Grča, Javorje, Novi Dol, Pod Bregom (Slovene: Pod bregom), Rakovec, and Slatno.

== Names ==
The name Dol pri Hrastniku literally means 'Dol near Hrastnik'. The name Dol is a common toponym in Slovenia. It is derived from the common noun dol 'small valley', referring to a local geographical feature.

At one time, the hamlet of Novi Dol was known as Meksiko. The hamlet of Črdenc is a contraction of Črni studenec 'black spring', referring to the source of Black Creek (Slovene: Črna).

== History ==
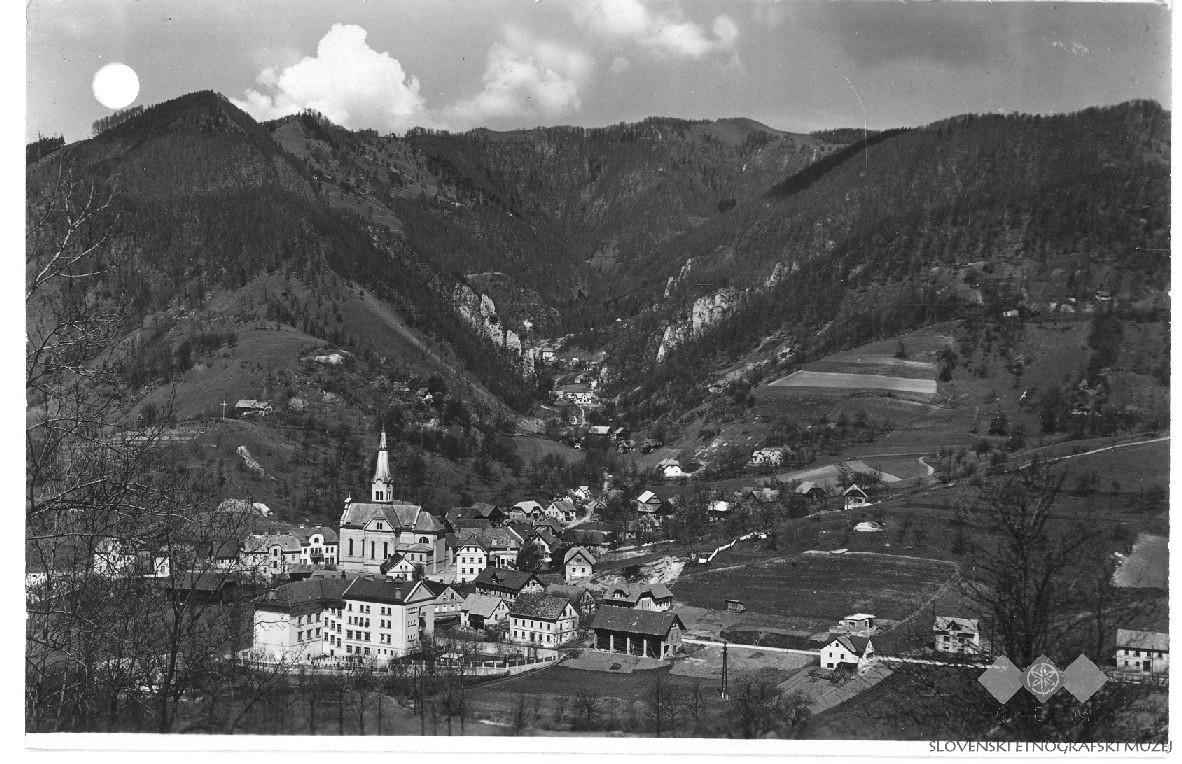
Postcard of Dol pri Hrastniku from the first half of the 20th century

Roman-era graves have been found in Dol pri Hrastniku, testifying to ancient settlement in the area. Part of a Roman sacrificial altar was discovered during roadwork and is now built into the rectory wall next to the entrance. During the feudal era, the village consisted of nine full farms and three smaller farms. During the Second World War, there was Partisan activity in the area from 1941 onward. In early March 1945, a Partisan unit attacked a German base at the school, resulting in the surrender of 100 German troops that then joined an Austrian partisan unit. After the Second World War, a new mining operation was established in the hamlet of Novi Dol, resulting in construction that made many of the hamlets contiguous.

=== Mass graves ===
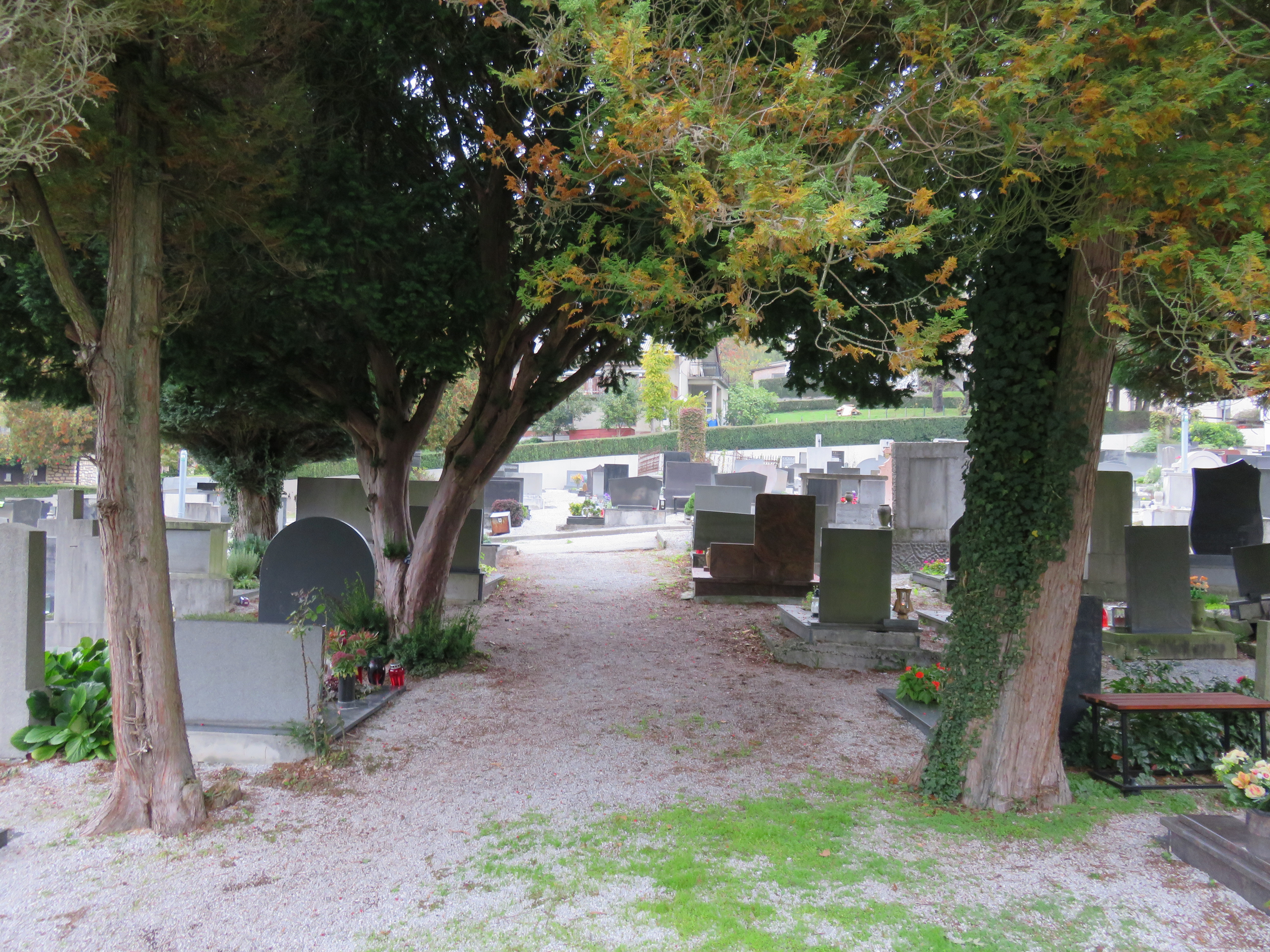
Cemetery Mass Grave

Dol pri Hrastniku is the site of two known mass graves from during and after the Second World War. The Old Hrastnik Mass Grave (Slovene: Grobišče Stari Hrastnik), also known as the Tierberg Mass Grave (Grobišče Tierberg) or Brnica Mass Grave (Grobišče Brnica), is believed to extend across the entire plateau northwest of the settlement. It contains the remains of Serbs murdered in May 1945 and Slovene civilians and Home Guard soldiers murdered in June 1945. Their bodies were placed in open shafts and pits in the abandoned mine on the plateau. The Cemetery Mass Grave (Grobišče na pokopališču) is located in the upper part of the local cemetery, about 50 m from the north wall near the road and 50 m from the east wall. A path through the cemetery crosses the grave site. It contains the remains of 17 German soldiers killed in an ambush on 23 December 1944 in Boben.

== Church ==
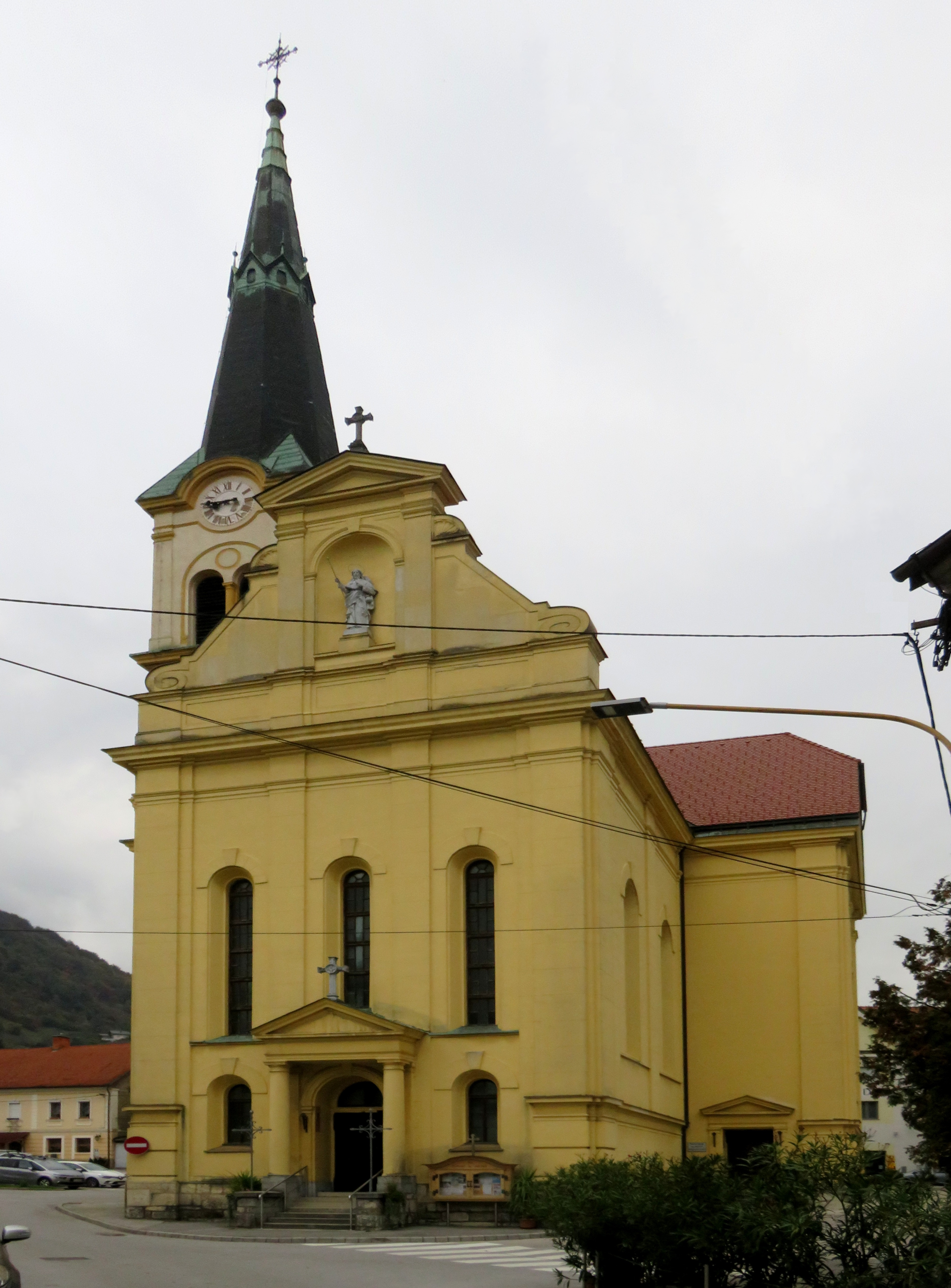
View from west

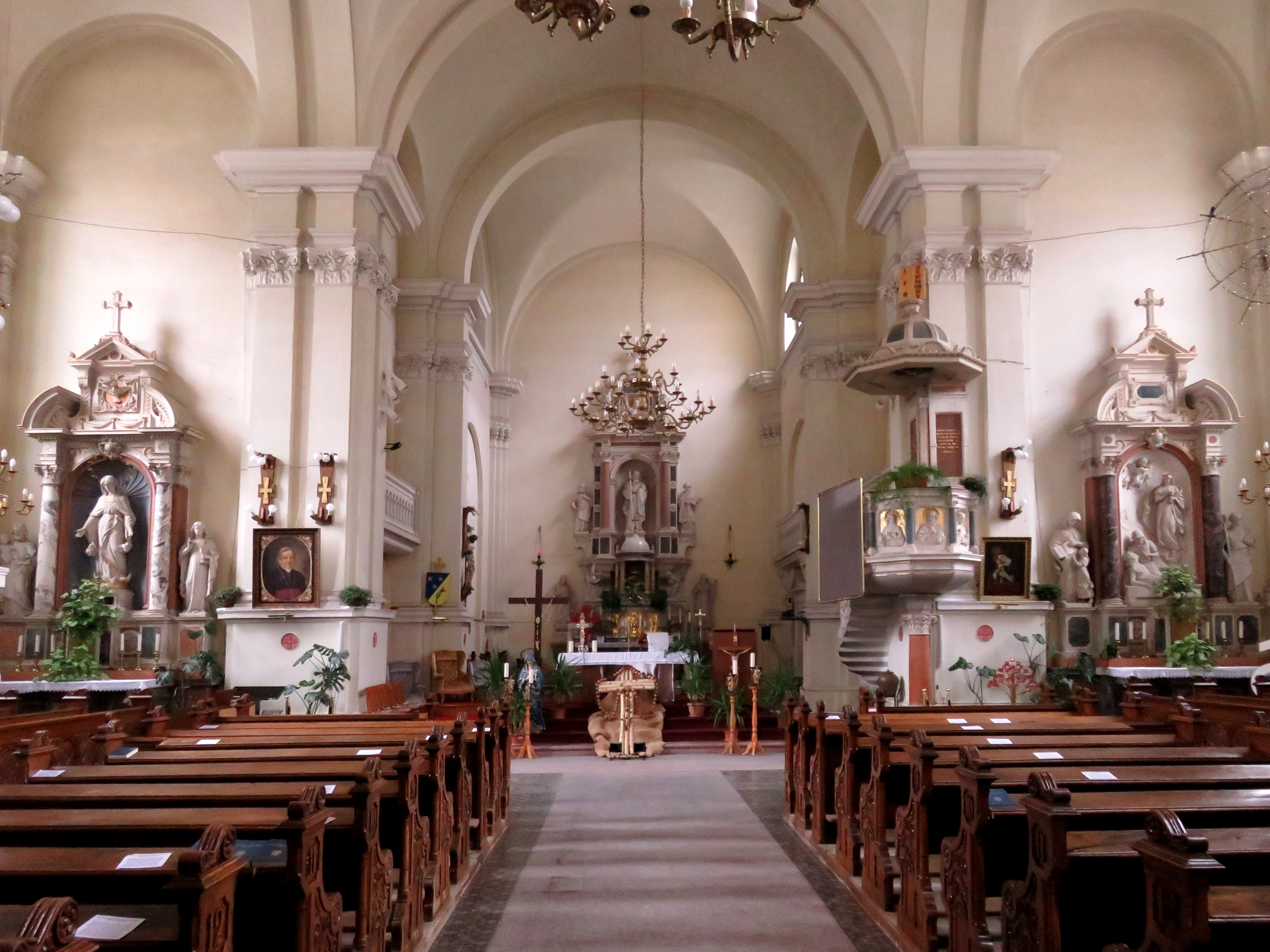
Interior

Saint James' Church

The parish church in the settlement is dedicated to Saint James (Slovene: sveti Jakob) and belongs to the Roman Catholic Diocese of Celje. It was built in 1908 on the site of a Gothic predecessor. In addition to the main, marble altar, the church has two side altars created by the stonemason Ignacij Čamernik. Two Venetian mosaics commissioned by Baroness de Seppi to commemorate the brothers Jurij and Franc Gossleth are of special value. Dol pri Hrastniku was made the seat of a parish in 1771.

== Other cultural heritage ==
Dol pri Hrastniku has a small stone wayside shrine engraved with the years 1668 and 1671. Next to it is a masonry chapel-shrine with columns dating from 1808. Another chapel-shrine, dating from the mid-19th century and with the remnants of frescoes, stand next to the house at Dol pri Hrastniku no. 92.

== Notable people ==
Notable people that were born or lived in Dol pri Hrastniku include:

- Anton Bantan (1909–1971), agricultural expert
- Sonja Draksler (born 1927), opera singer
- Anton Gnus (1853–1944), schoolmaster and library founder
- Jožef Hasl (1733–1804), religious writer
- Drago Kotnik (born 1927), economist
- Janko Polak (1878–1974), poet and story writer
