= Hrastnik =

- Town
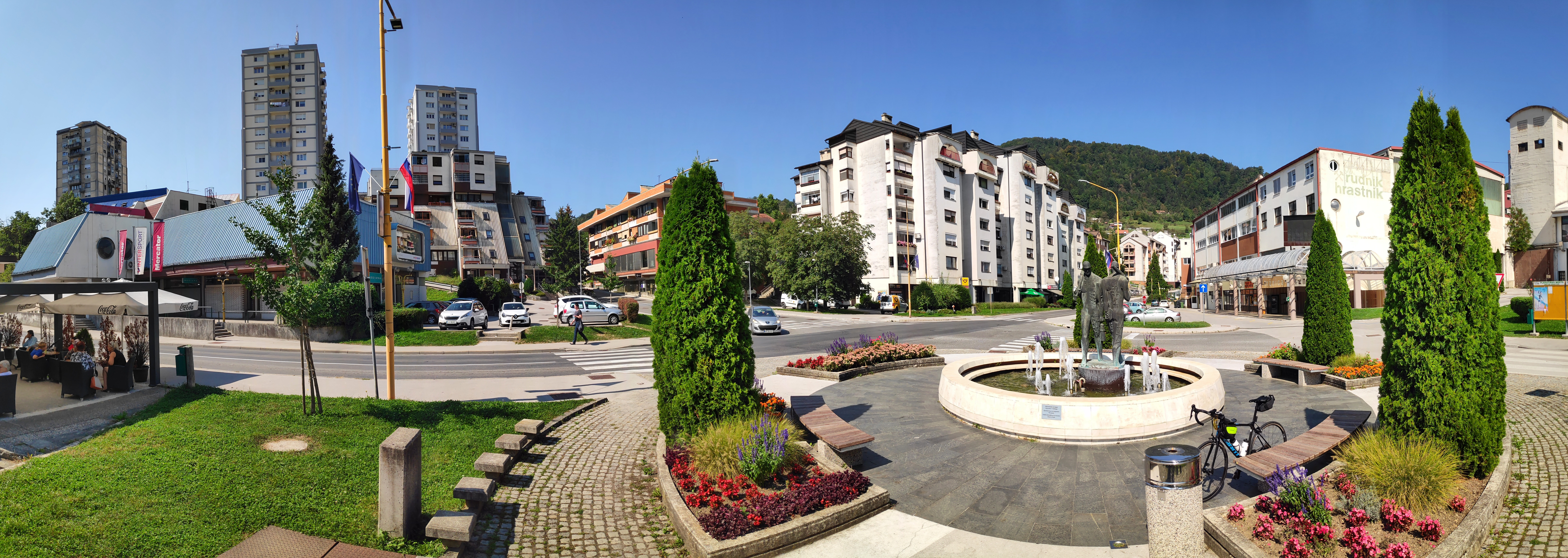
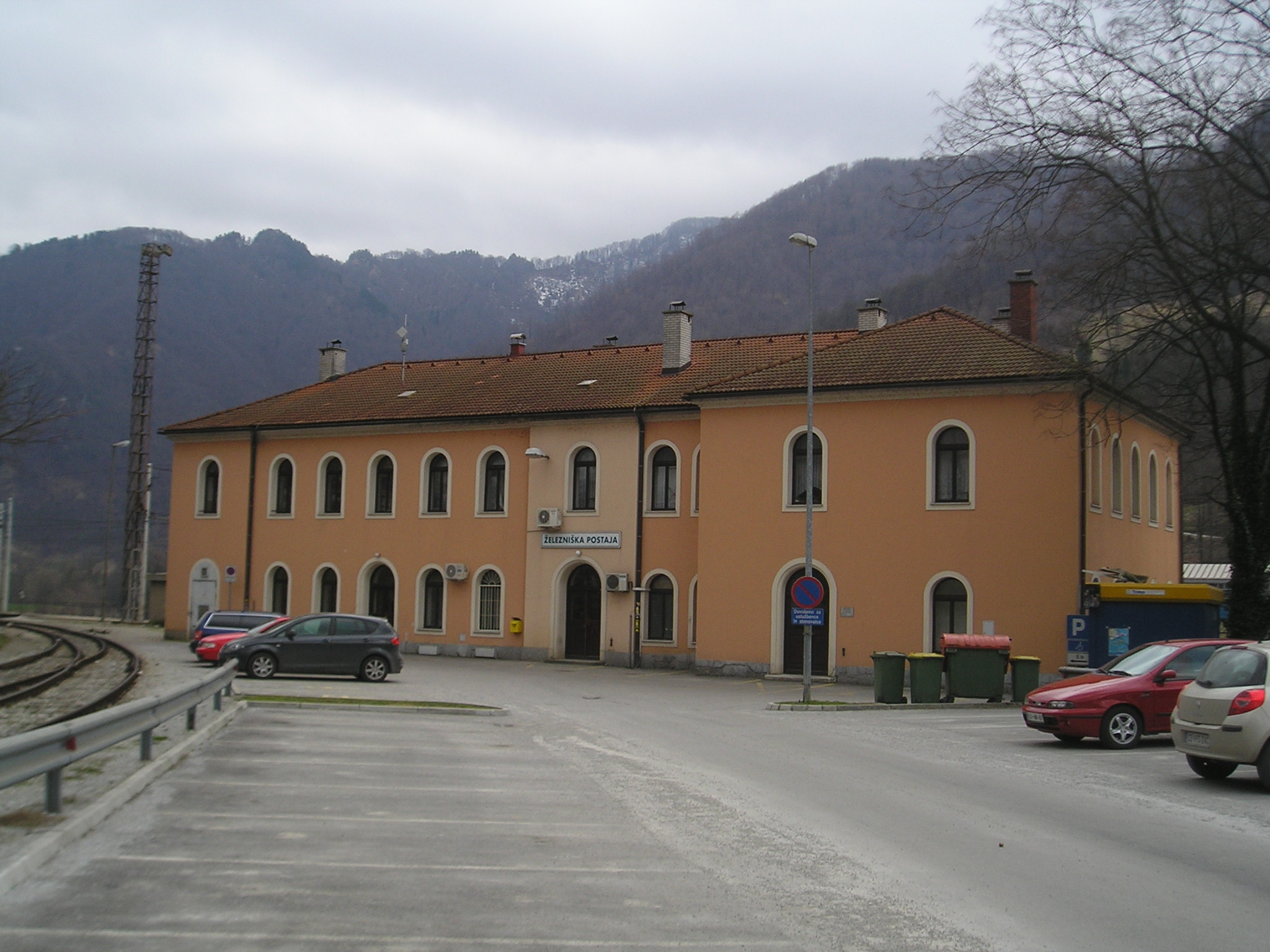
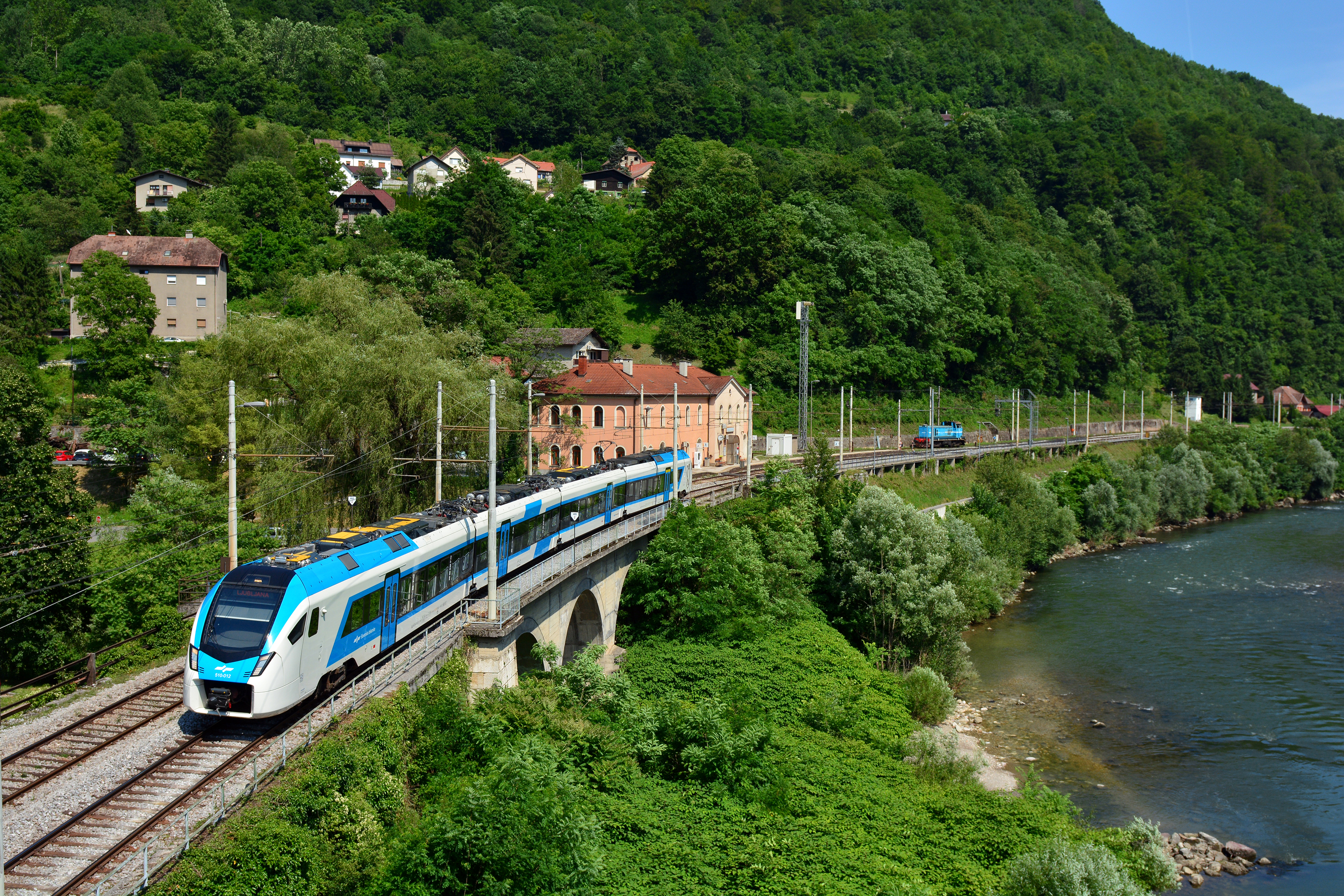
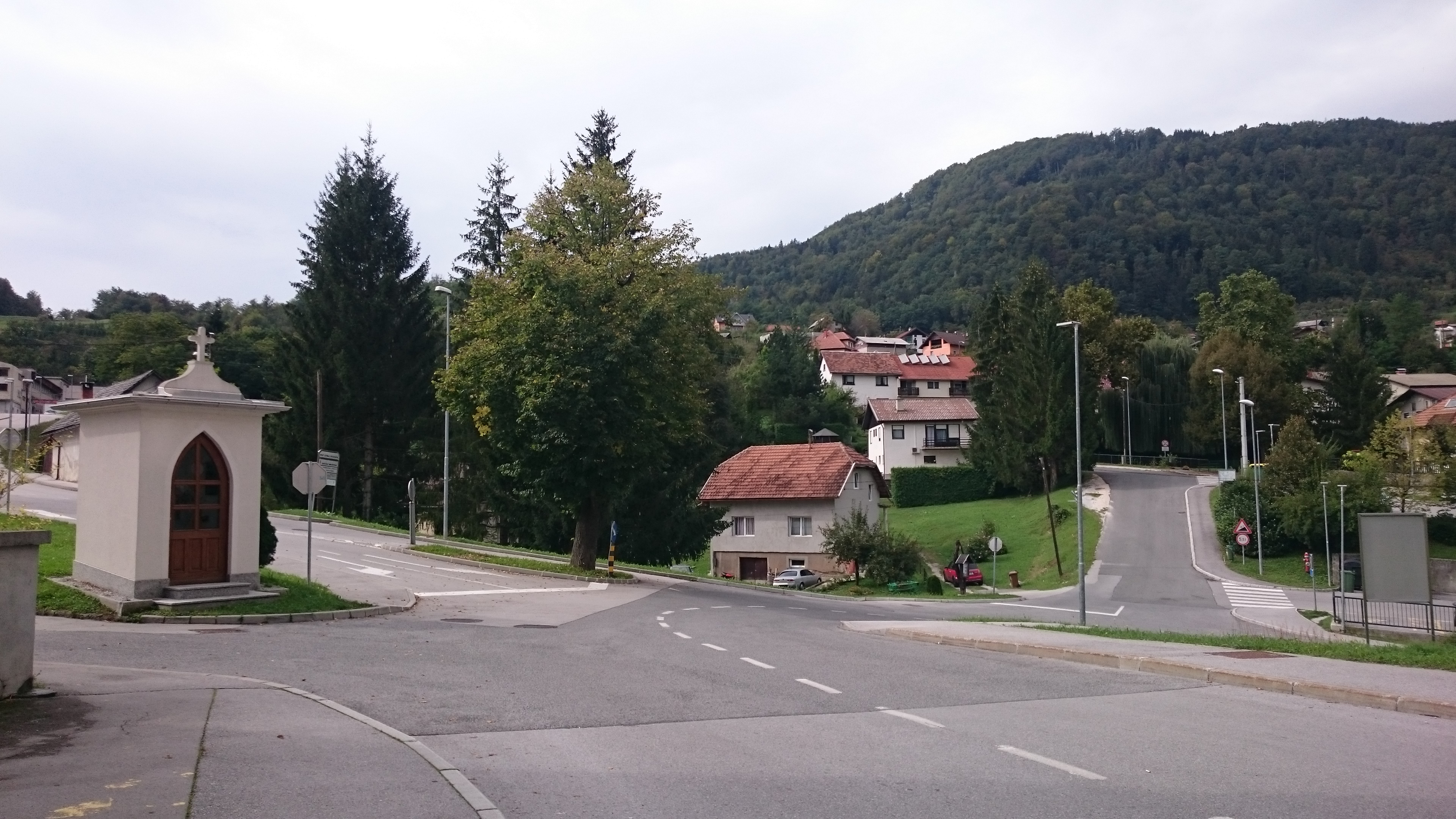
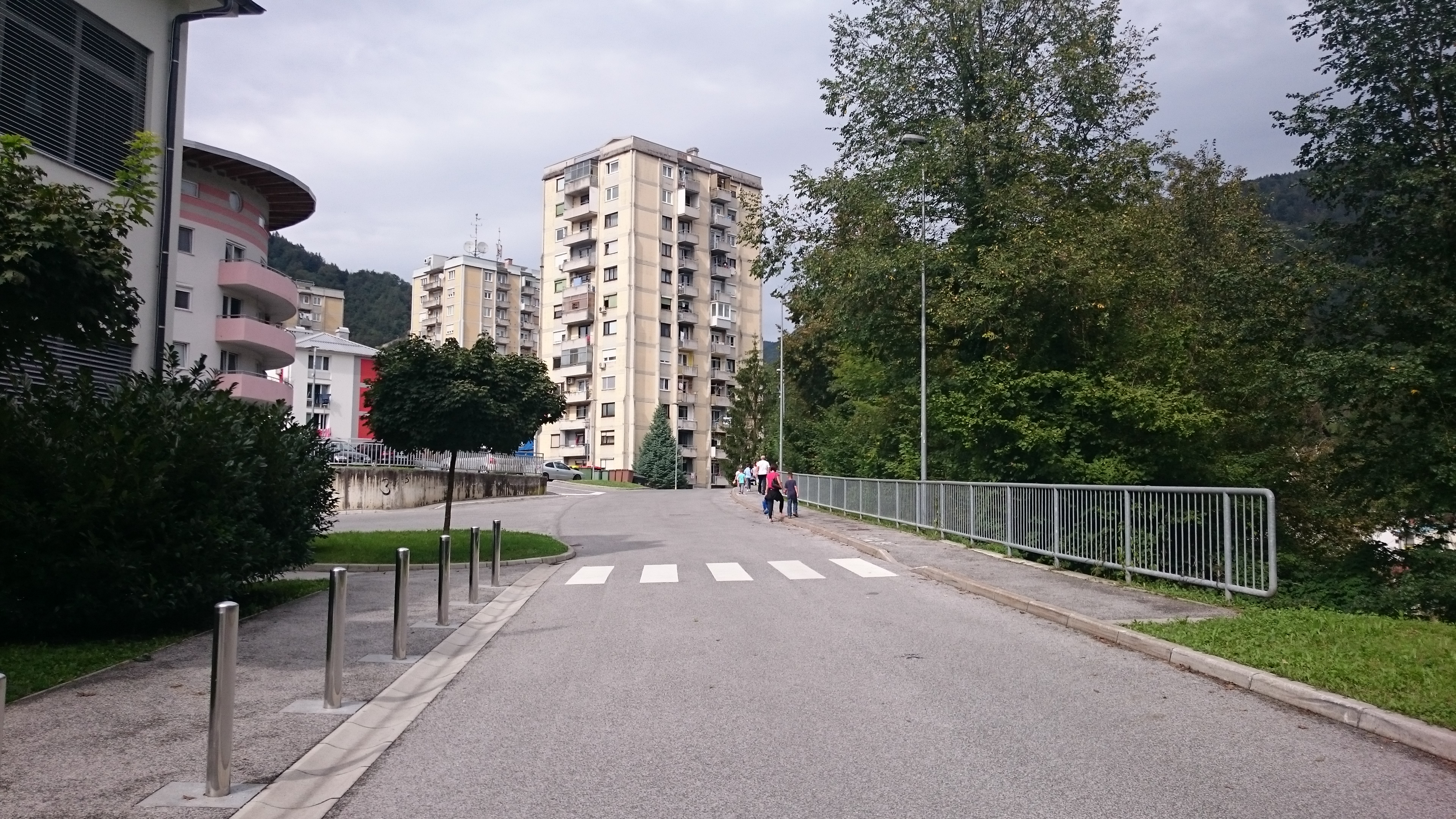
- From top, left to right: Overview of Hrastnik's center, Railway station, Train passing Hrastnik, Street with a chapel, Log street

- Flag Coat of arms

- Location in Slovenia
- Coordinates: 46°8′52.38″N 15°9′9.91″E
- Country: Slovenia
- Traditional region: Styria
- Statistical region: Central Sava
- Municipality: Hrastnik

Area
  - Total: 5.8 km^{2} (2.2 sq mi)
- Elevation: 296.2 m (972 ft)

Population (2012)
  - Total: 5,561
- Postal code: 1430 Hrastnik
- Vehicle registration: LJ
- Climate: Cfb

Hrastnik (pronounced [ˈxɾáːstnik], German: Hrastnigg) is a town in the Central Sava Valley in central Slovenia. It is the seat of the Municipality of Hrastnik. The area is part of the traditional region of Styria. The entire municipality is now included in the Central Sava Statistical Region.

== History ==
In the past, the majority of locals were employed in the glass, coal, or chemical industry. Today the glass and chemicals factories still operate, but many people also go to work in neighbouring towns such as Trbovlje or Zagorje ob Savi. Coal started being mined in Hrastnik in 1822. Production was limited until 1849, when the town was connected to the Austrian Southern Railway. Hrastnik is also known for glass manufacturing. The first school was opened in Hrastnik in 1860. It was originally operated for miners' children at the miners' restaurant but became a public school in 1872. A separate school building was built in 1879. A German-language school was established in 1907 and operated until the end of the First World War.

=== Mass grave ===
Hrastnik is the site of a mass grave associated with the Second World War. The Senica Ravine Mass Grave (Slovene: Grobišče Senicatov graben) is located below an orchard by the house at Pot na Kal no. 2. It contains an undetermined number of victims.

=== Recent ===
On 16 September 2022, heavy wind and rains left a leak in the roof of the music school in Hrastnik, which firefighters had to repair.

== Church ==
The parish church in the settlement is dedicated to Christ the King and belongs to the Roman Catholic Diocese of Celje. It was built in 1936. A second church in the south of the settlement, belonging to the same parish, is dedicated to Our Lady of Mount Carmel. It dates to the 16th century with major 17th-century adaptations.

Historical population
Year	Pop.	±%
1948	4,629	—
1953	5,161	+11.5%
1961	6,097	+18.1%
1971	6,092	−0.1%
1981	6,851	+12.5%
1991	6,786	−0.9%
2002	5,865	−13.6%
2011	5,621	−4.2%
2021	4,872	−13.3%
Population size may be affected by changes in administrative divisions.

== Twin Towns ==
- Codroipo, Italy
