= Central Sava Statistical Region =

Coordinates: 46°09′00″N 14°58′00″E

Central Sava Statistical Region zasavska statistična regija
- Statistical region
- Municipalities: 4
- Largest town: Trbovlje

Area
  - Total: 264 km^{2} (102 sq mi)

Population (2018)
  - Total: 57,050
  - Density: 216/km^{2} (560/sq mi)

Statistics
  - Households: 23529
  - Employed: 12301
  - Registered unemployed: 3374
  - College/university students: 2094
  - Regional GDP (2019): EUR 701 m (EUR 12,287 per capita)
- HDI (2022): 0.848 very high · 12th

The Central Sava Statistical Region (Slovene: zasavska statistična regija) is a statistical region in Slovenia. This statistical region in the Sava Hills is the smallest region in the country in terms of both area and population. In early-2010 almost 41,700 people lived on 264 km^{2}, meaning that together with the Central Slovenia Statistical Region it is the most densely populated statistical region. The natural and geographic features of this region create conditions for industrial activities and more than a third of gross value added is still generated by manufacturing, mining, and other industry. In 2013, the region once again recorded the highest negative annual population growth rate (−11.9‰), which was mainly a result of migration to other statistical regions. Among all statistical regions in 2013, this region had the highest negative net migration between regions; namely, −9.5. This region also stands out by age of mothers at childbirth. In 2013 first-time mothers in the region were on average 28.5 years old, whereas first-time mothers in the Central Slovenia Statistical Region were on average 1 year older. In the same year, the number of unemployed persons increased further. The registered unemployment rate was among the highest in the country (16.6%). In comparison with other regions, this is 7 percentage points more than in the region with the lowest registered unemployment rate, Upper Carniola, and almost 1 percentage point less than in the region with the highest unemployment rate, the Mura Statistical Region. According to the labour migration index, this is the most residential statistical region. In 2013, 60% of people in the region worked in their region of residence, and 40% worked in another region.

== Municipalities ==
The Central Sava Statistical Region comprises the following four municipalities:

- Hrastnik
- Litija
- Trbovlje
- Zagorje ob Savi

== Demographics ==
The population in 2020 was 41,657. It has a total area of 264 km^{2}.

== Economy ==
Employment structure: 51.2% services, 46.9% industry, 1.9% agriculture.

=== Tourism ===
It attracts very few tourists with only 0.1% of the total number of tourists in Slovenia.

== Transportation ==
- Length of motorways: 0.6 km
- Length of other roads: 751 km

== Sources ==
- Slovenian regions in figures 2014
