= Brhovo =

- Location in Slovenia
- Coordinates: 45°56′52″N 15°00′43″E
- Country: Slovenia
- Traditional region: Lower Carniola
- Statistical region: Southeast Slovenia
- Municipality: Trebnje
- Elevation: 340 m (1,120 ft)

Brhovo (pronounced [bəɾˈxoːʋɔ], sometimes Vrhovo or in older sources Verhovo, German: Werchou) is a former village in eastern Slovenia in the Municipality of Trebnje. It is now part of the village of Mala Ševnica. It is part of the traditional region of Lower Carniola and is now included in the Southeast Slovenia Statistical Region.

== Geography ==
Brhovo lies northeast of the village center of Mala Ševnica. Žug Hill (Slovene: Žugov hrib, elevation: 349 meters or 1,145 feet) rises to the west, and Trnič Hill (elevation: 435 meters or 1,427 feet) to the north. The Cejniče Woods lie north of Brhovo, where there is a powerful spring known as Na studencu (literally, 'at the spring').

== Name ==
The toponym Brhovo, like the variant Vrhovo, is found only in Lower Carniola. The pronunciation with an initial B- (also found in the local pronunciation of Vrhovo in the Municipality of Radeče and for Vrhovo pri Šentlovrencu) and medieval attestations indicate that the name is not derived from the common noun vrh 'summit, peak'. Instead, it is believed to have resulted from ellipsis of a name like *Bryxovo selo (literally, 'Bryxъ's village') or *Bryxovo poľe (literally, 'Bryxъ's field'), referring to an early resident of the place.

== History ==
Brhovo was annexed by Mala Ševnica in 1953, ending its existence as a separate settlement.
