= Podhajce (disambiguation) =

Podhajce is a city in Ternopil Oblast, Ukraine.

Podhajce may also refer to:

- Battle of Podhajce (disambiguation)

== See also ==
- Podgaj (disambiguation)
- Podgaje (disambiguation)
- Podhajcer Shul, a former synagogue in Manhattan, New York City
