= Lamovje =

- Location in Slovenia
- Coordinates: 46°3′40″N 15°03′25″E
- Country: Slovenia
- Traditional region: Lower Carniola
- Statistical region: Central Sava
- Municipality: Litija
- Elevation: 580 m (1,900 ft)

Lamovje (Slovene pronunciation: [laˈmoːu̯jɛ], in older sources Lomovje) is a former settlement in the Municipality of Litija in central Slovenia. It is now part of the village of Sopota. The area is part of the traditional region of Lower Carniola and is now included with the rest of the municipality in the Central Sava Statistical Region.

== Geography ==
Lamovje stands in the eastern part of Sopota, on a small road branching off of the local road from Sopota to Jagnjenica.

== Name ==
Lamovje was attested in historical sources as Lumbay c. 1420 and as Lumba in 1499.

== History ==
Lamovje had a population of 12 living in one house in 1900. Lamovje was annexed by Dobovica in 1952, ending its existence as a separate settlement. When Sopota became a separate settlement in 1995, Lamovje was assigned to its territory.
