= Čimerno =

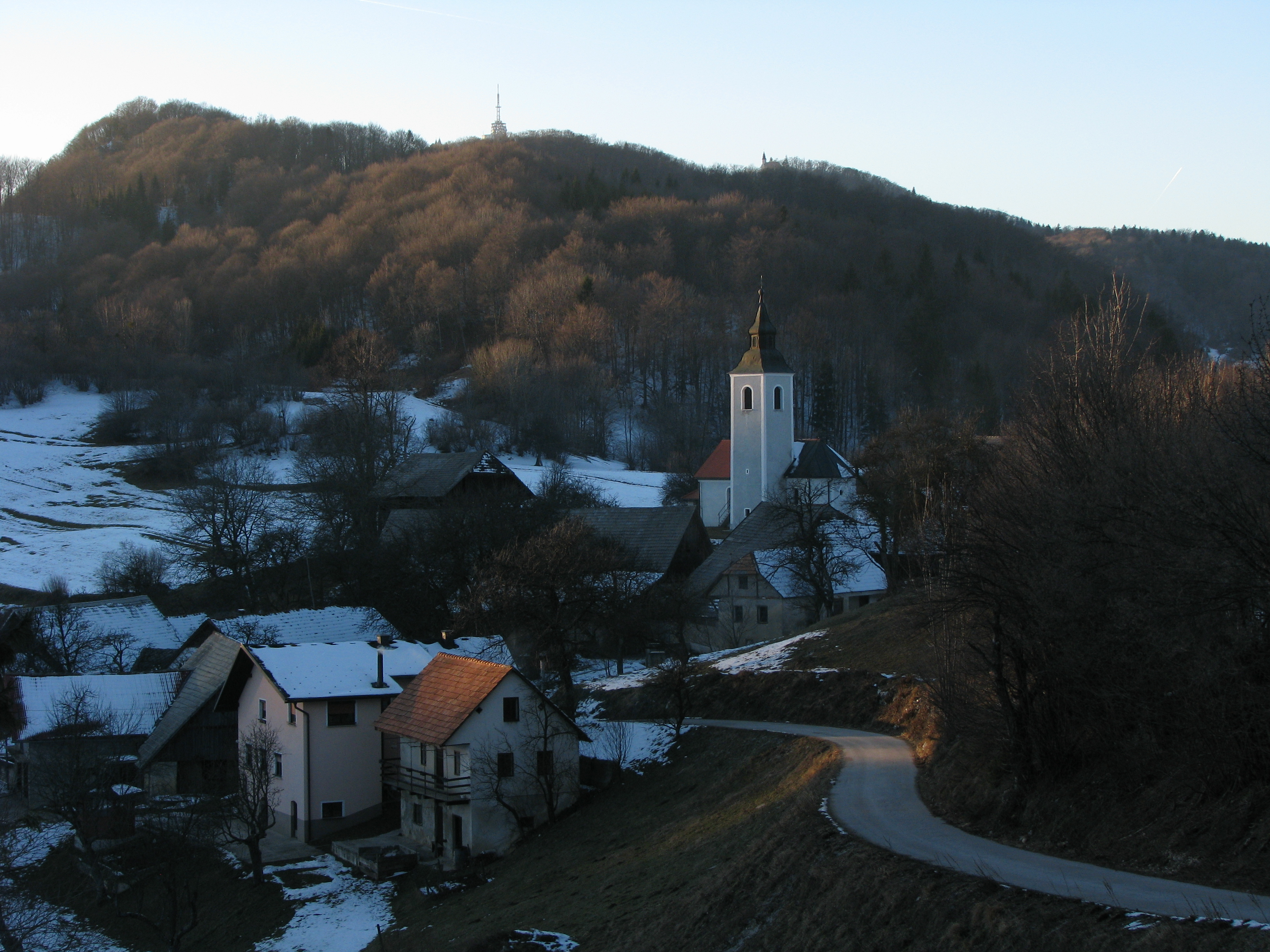

- Location in Slovenia
- Coordinates: 46°4′55.49″N 15°7′11.95″E
- Country: Slovenia
- Traditional region: Lower Carniola
- Statistical region: Lower Sava
- Municipality: Radeče

Area
  - Total: 4 km^{2} (1.5 sq mi)
- Elevation: 813.2 m (2,668 ft)

Population (2002)
  - Total: 36

Čimerno (pronounced [ˈtʃiːmɛɾnɔ]) is a small settlement in the Municipality of Radeče in eastern Slovenia. The area is part of the historical region of Lower Carniola. The municipality is now included in the Lower Sava Statistical Region; until January 2014 it was part of the Savinja Statistical Region.

The local church is dedicated to the Holy Trinity and belongs to the Parish of Svibno. It is a medieval church that was extended and rebuilt on a number of occasions.
