= Rudna Vas =

- Location in Slovenia
- Coordinates: 46°2′40.21″N 15°9′55.86″E
- Country: Slovenia
- Traditional region: Lower Carniola
- Statistical region: Lower Sava
- Municipality: Radeče

Area
  - Total: 1.05 km^{2} (0.41 sq mi)
- Elevation: 590.6 m (1,938 ft)

Population (2002)
  - Total: 19

Rudna Vas (pronounced [ˈɾuːdna ˈʋaːs]) is a small settlement in the Municipality of Radeče in eastern Slovenia. It lies in the hills south of Radeče, to the northwest of Brunk in the historical region of Lower Carniola. The municipality is now included in the Lower Sava Statistical Region; until January 2014 it was part of the Savinja Statistical Region.
