= Log pri Vrhovem =

- Location in Slovenia
- Coordinates: 46°2′4.23″N 15°13′19.92″E
- Country: Slovenia
- Traditional region: Lower Carniola
- Statistical region: Lower Sava
- Municipality: Radeče

Area
  - Total: 1.52 km^{2} (0.59 sq mi)
- Elevation: 217.9 m (715 ft)

Population (2002)
  - Total: 84

Log pri Vrhovem (pronounced [ˈloːk pɾi ʋəɾˈxɔːʋɛm]) is a small settlement next to Vrhovo in the Municipality of Radeče in eastern Slovenia. The area is part of the historical region of Lower Carniola. The municipality is now included in the Lower Sava Statistical Region; until January 2014 it was part of the Savinja Statistical Region.

== Name ==
The name of the settlement was changed from Log to Log pri Vrhovem in 1953.

== Erkenstein Castle ==
The remains of a late 12th-century castle known as Erkenstein Castle (Slovene: grad Erkenštajn) are located in the settlement. It was partially destroyed in the mid-15th century and abandoned in the 17th century some time soon after it was burnt down by rebellious peasants in 1635.
