= Žebnik =

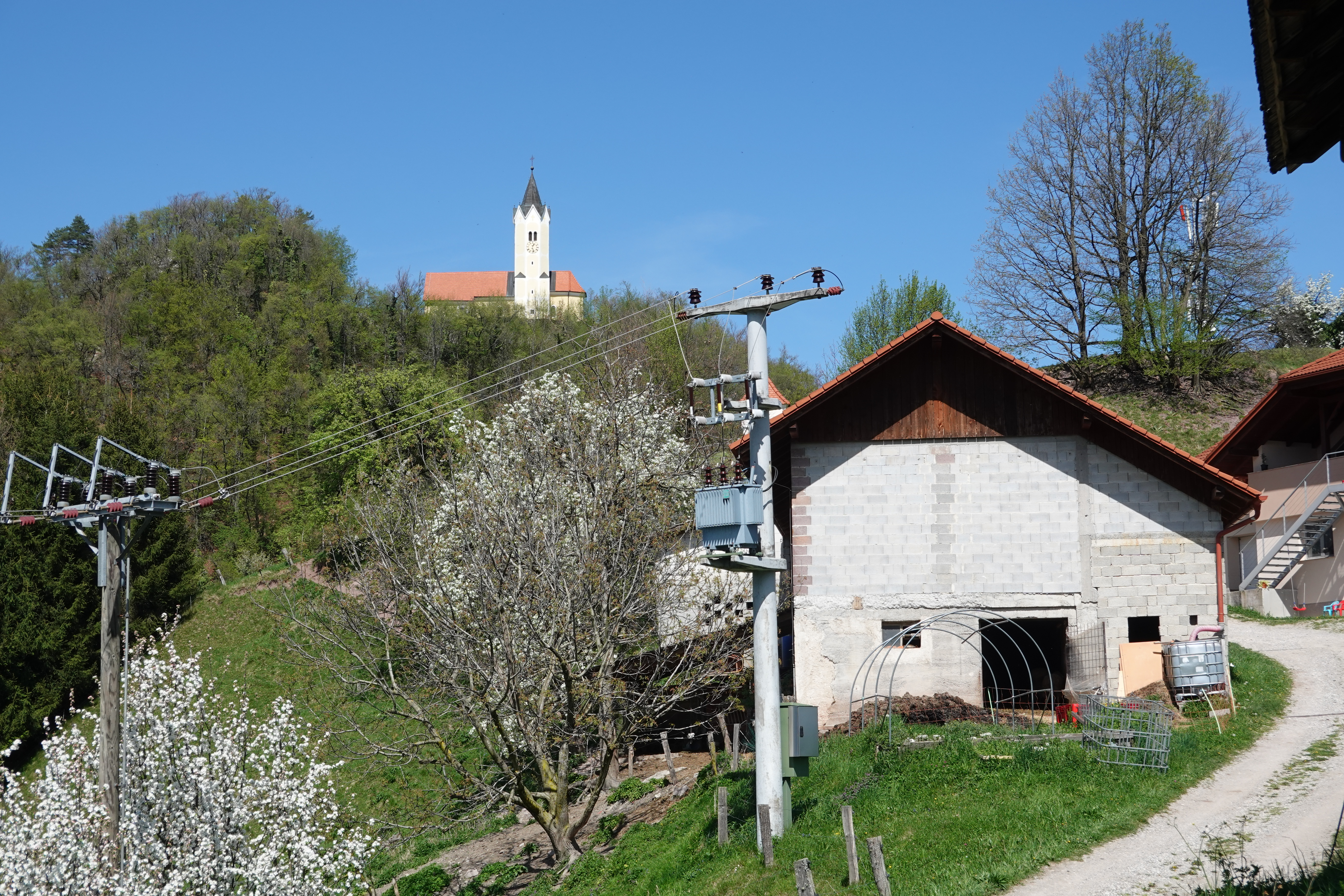

- Location in Slovenia
- Coordinates: 46°3′39.56″N 15°9′4.85″E
- Country: Slovenia
- Traditional region: Lower Carniola
- Statistical region: Lower Sava
- Municipality: Radeče

Area
  - Total: 1.69 km^{2} (0.65 sq mi)
- Elevation: 411.5 m (1,350 ft)

Population (2002)
  - Total: 152

Žebnik (pronounced [ˈʒeːbnik] or [ʒɛbˈniːk]; in older sources also Žibnik, German: Siebeneck) is a dispersed settlement in the hills west of Radeče in eastern Slovenia. The area is part of the historical region of Lower Carniola. The municipality is now included in the Lower Sava Statistical Region; until January 2014 it was part of the Savinja Statistical Region.

The local church is dedicated to Our Lady of Sorrows and belongs to the Parish of Radeče. The nave dates to the 16th century, the sanctuary dates to the 17th century, and the belfry to the 18th century.
