= Podgaj =

Podgaj may refer to the following places:

== Bosnia and Herzegovina ==
- Podgaj, Srebrenica, a village in the municipality of Srebrenica
- Podgaj, Tomislavgrad, a village in the municipality of Tomislavgrad

== Poland ==
- Podgaj, Lower Silesian Voivodeship (south-west Poland)
- Podgaj, Aleksandrów County in Kuyavian-Pomeranian Voivodeship (north-central Poland)
- Podgaj, Inowrocław County in Kuyavian-Pomeranian Voivodeship (north-central Poland)
- Podgaj, Łódź Voivodeship (central Poland)
- Podgaj, Lublin Voivodeship (east Poland)
- Podgaj, Greater Poland Voivodeship (west-central Poland)

== Slovenia ==
- Podgaj, Šentjur, a settlement in the Municipality of Šentjur

== See also ==
- Podkraj (disambiguation)
- Potkraj (disambiguation)
