= Podkraj =

Podkraj may refer to several places in Slovenia:

- Podkraj, Ajdovščina, a settlement in the Municipality of Ajdovščina
- Podkraj, Hrastnik, a settlement in the Municipality of Hrastnik
- Podkraj, Ig, a settlement in the Municipality of Ig
- Podkraj, Ravne na Koroškem, a settlement in the Municipality of Ravne na Koroškem
- Podkraj, Velike Lašče, a settlement in the Municipality of Velike Lašče
- Podkraj, Žalec, a settlement in the Municipality of Žalece
- Podkraj pri Mežici, a settlement in the Municipality of Mežica
- Podkraj pri Velenju, a settlement in the Municipality of Velenje
- Podkraj pri Zagorju, a settlement in the Municipality of Zagorje ob Savi
- Zavrate, a settlement in the Municipality of Radeče (known as Podkraj until 1984)

and to:

- Podkraj, Glamoč, a village in Bosnia and Herzegovina
- Podkraj, Travnik, a village in Bosnia and Herzegovina
