= Počakovo =

- Location in Slovenia
- Coordinates: 46°3′18.4″N 15°5′47.99″E
- Country: Slovenia
- Traditional region: Lower Carniola
- Statistical region: Lower Sava
- Municipality: Radeče

Area
  - Total: 7.85 km^{2} (3.03 sq mi)
- Elevation: 553.7 m (1,817 ft)

Population (2002)
  - Total: 138

Počakovo (pronounced [pɔˈtʃaːkɔʋɔ]; in older sources also Sveti Janez v Kotu, German: Sankt Johann) is a small settlement in the Municipality of Radeče in eastern Slovenia. The area is part of the historical region of Lower Carniola. The municipality is now included in the Lower Sava Statistical Region; until January 2014 it was part of the Savinja Statistical Region. It includes the hamlets of Spodnje Počakovo, Zgornje Počakovo, Češence (German: Kerschdorf), Sveti Janez, and Jatne Kote.

The local church is dedicated to Saint John the Evangelist and belongs to the Parish of Svibno. It was built in 1881 on the site of a Baroque chapel.
