= Plat, Mežica =

Plat
- Location in Slovenia
- Coordinates: 46°30′32.14″N 14°53′40.54″E
- Country: Slovenia
- Traditional region: Carinthia
- Statistical region: Carinthia
- Municipality: Mežica

Area
  - Total: 6.56 km^{2} (2.53 sq mi)
- Elevation: 1,013 m (3,323 ft)

Population (2002)
  - Total: 70

Plat (pronounced [ˈplaːt]) is a dispersed settlement in the hills southeast of Mežica in the Carinthia region in northern Slovenia.

The local church is dedicated to Saint Leonard and belongs to the Parish of Mežica. It was built in the second half of the 15th century.
