= Breg, Mežica =

Breg
- Location in Slovenia
- Coordinates: 46°30′10.61″N 14°50′51.76″E
- Country: Slovenia
- Traditional region: Carinthia
- Statistical region: Carinthia
- Municipality: Mežica

Area
  - Total: 3.42 km^{2} (1.32 sq mi)
- Elevation: 712.5 m (2,338 ft)

Population (2002)
  - Total: 79

Breg (pronounced [ˈbɾeːk]) is a settlement in the hills south of Mežica in the Carinthia region in northern Slovenia.

It was a typical miners' settlement associated with the nearby lead and zinc mine under Mount Peca. As such, the entire late-19th century miners' village has been declared a monument of national heritage by the Slovenian Ministry of Culture.
