= Močilno =

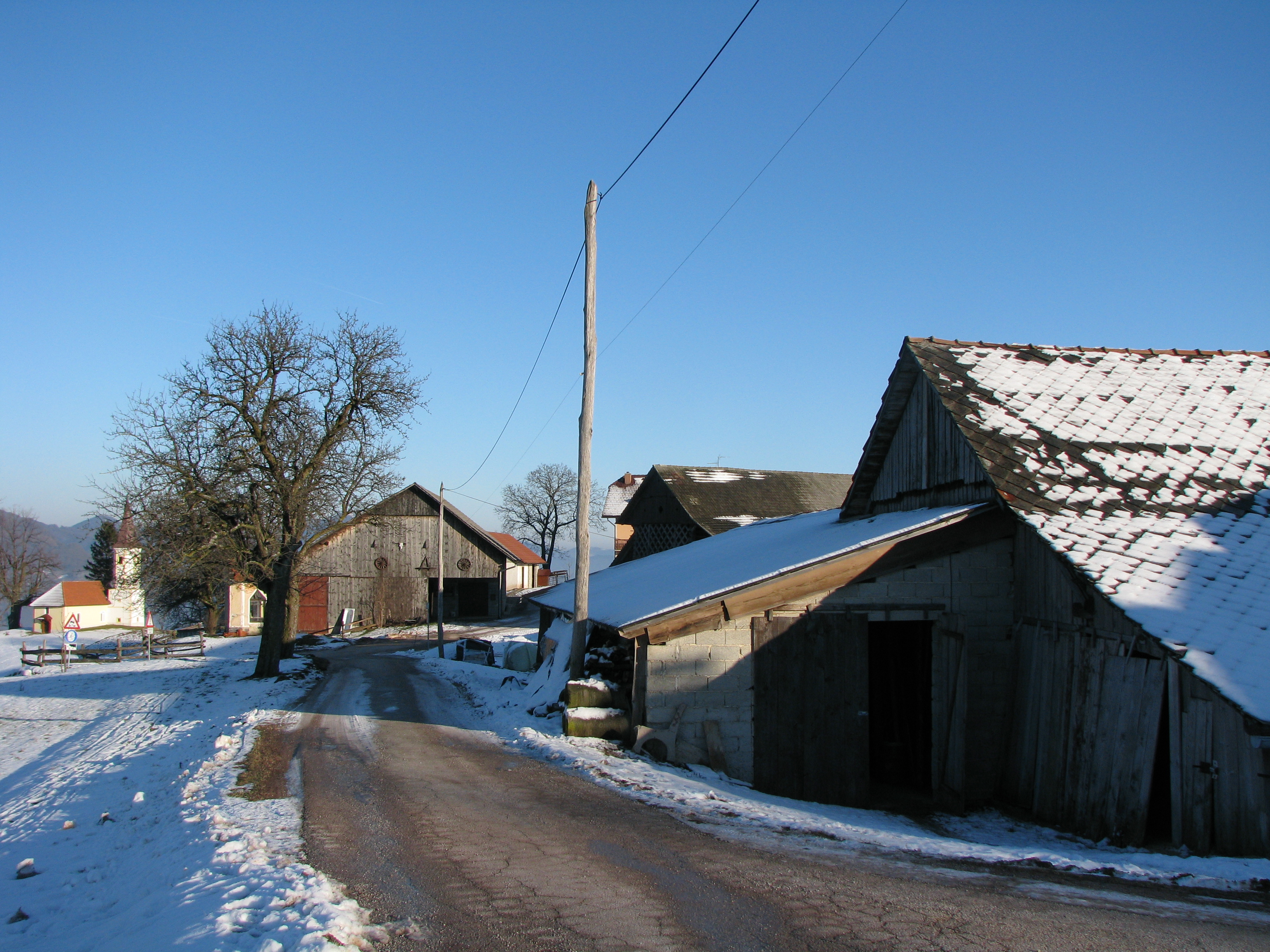

- Location in Slovenia
- Coordinates: 46°3′4.59″N 15°8′50.33″E
- Country: Slovenia
- Traditional region: Lower Carniola
- Statistical region: Lower Sava
- Municipality: Radeče

Area
  - Total: 3.25 km^{2} (1.25 sq mi)
- Elevation: 579.8 m (1,902 ft)

Population (2002)
  - Total: 109

Močilno (pronounced [mɔˈtʃiːu̯nɔ]) is a dispersed settlement in the Municipality of Radeče in the historical region of Lower Carniola of Slovenia. The municipality is now included in the Lower Sava Statistical Region; until January 2014 it was part of the Savinja Statistical Region.

The local church is dedicated to Saint Nicholas and belongs to the Parish of Radeče. It dates to the late 17th century.
