= Loška Gora, Radeče =

Loška Gora
- Location in Slovenia
- Coordinates: 46°3′8.94″N 15°10′58.28″E
- Country: Slovenia
- Traditional region: Lower Carniola
- Statistical region: Lower Sava
- Municipality: Radeče

Area
  - Total: 0.64 km^{2} (0.25 sq mi)
- Elevation: 318.3 m (1,044 ft)

Population (2002)
  - Total: 5

Loška Gora (pronounced [ˈloːʃka ˈɡɔːɾa]) is a small dispersed settlement in the Municipality of Radeče in eastern Slovenia. It lies in the hills just south of Radeče in the historical region of Lower Carniola. The municipality is now included in the Lower Sava Statistical Region; until January 2014 it was part of the Savinja Statistical Region.
