= Jagnjenica =

- Village
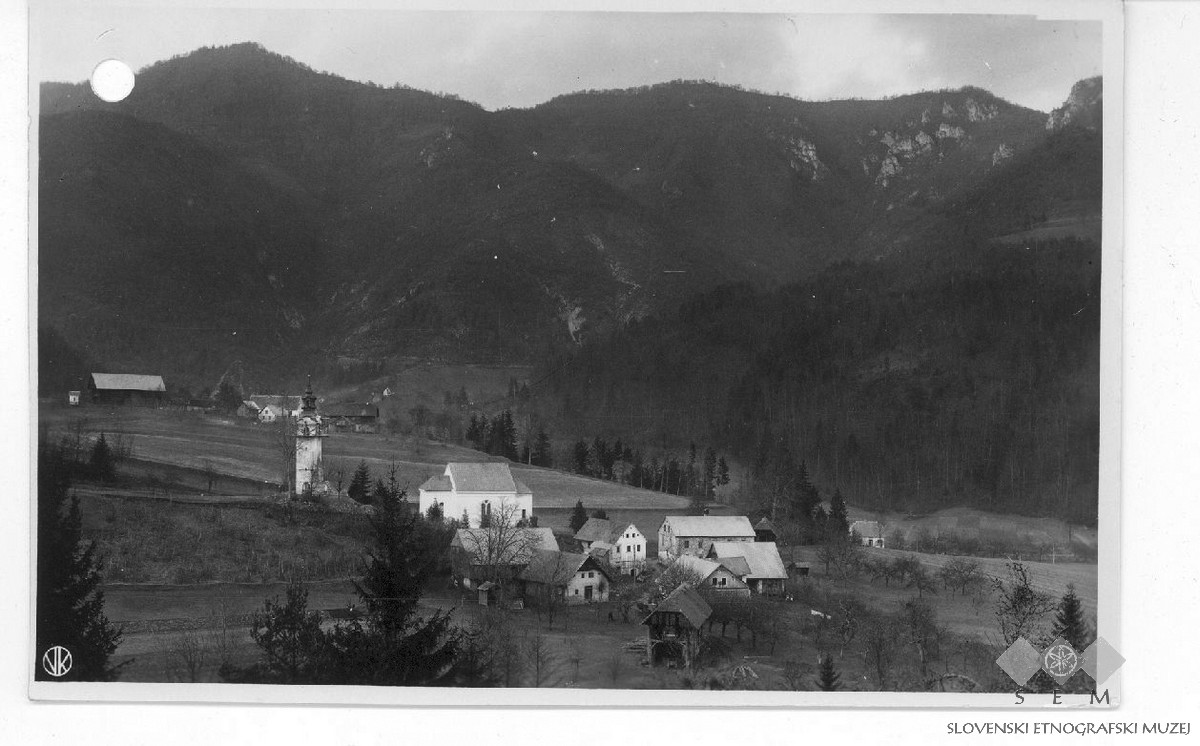
- Postcard of Jagnjenica

- Location in Slovenia
- Coordinates: 46°4′1.37″N 15°7′30.91″E
- Country: Slovenia
- Traditional region: Lower Carniola
- Statistical region: Lower Sava
- Municipality: Radeče

Area
  - Total: 4.44 km^{2} (1.71 sq mi)
- Elevation: 352.9 m (1,158 ft)

Population (2002)
  - Total: 326

Jagnjenica (pronounced [ˈjaːɡnjɛnitsa]) is a settlement in the Municipality of Radeče in eastern Slovenia. The area is part of the historical region of Lower Carniola. The municipality is now included in the Lower Sava Statistical Region; until January 2014 it was part of the Savinja Statistical Region.

The local church is dedicated to Saint Margaret (Slovene: sveta Marjeta) and belongs to the Parish of Svibno. It was built in 1900 on the site of an earlier church mentioned in written documents in the 16th century. Parts of the belfry include remnants of an 18th-century structure.
