= Brunška Gora =

- Location in Slovenia
- Coordinates: 46°2′48.57″N 15°10′35.42″E
- Country: Slovenia
- Traditional region: Lower Carniola
- Statistical region: Lower Sava
- Municipality: Radeče

Area
  - Total: 0.74 km^{2} (0.29 sq mi)
- Elevation: 453.5 m (1,488 ft)

Population (2002)
  - Total: 74

Brunška Gora (pronounced [ˈbɾuːnʃka ˈɡɔːɾa]; in older sources also Bruniška Gora) is a small dispersed settlement in the Municipality of Radeče in eastern Slovenia. The area is part of the historical region of Lower Carniola and the municipality is now included in the Lower Sava Statistical Region; until January 2014 it was part of the Savinja Statistical Region.
