= Lom, Mežica =

Lom
- Location in Slovenia
- Coordinates: 46°32′26.24″N 14°50′12.85″E
- Country: Slovenia
- Traditional region: Carinthia
- Statistical region: Carinthia
- Municipality: Mežica

Area
  - Total: 3.77 km^{2} (1.46 sq mi)
- Elevation: 692.3 m (2,271 ft)

Population (2002)
  - Total: 113

Lom (pronounced [ˈlɔm]) is a dispersed settlement in the hills north of Mežica in the Carinthia region in northern Slovenia.
