= Stari Dvor, Radeče =

Stari Dvor
- Location in Slovenia
- Coordinates: 46°4′0.03″N 15°8′9.53″E
- Country: Slovenia
- Traditional region: Lower Carniola
- Statistical region: Lower Sava
- Municipality: Radeče

Area
  - Total: 0.66 km^{2} (0.25 sq mi)
- Elevation: 374 m (1,227 ft)

Population (2002)
  - Total: 85

Stari Dvor (pronounced [ˈstaːɾi ˈdʋɔɾ]) is a small settlement in the Municipality of Radeče in eastern Slovenia. The municipality is now included in the Lower Sava Statistical Region; until January 2014 it was part of the Savinja Statistical Region. The area is part of the traditional region of Lower Carniola.
