= Obrežje, Radeče =

Obrežje
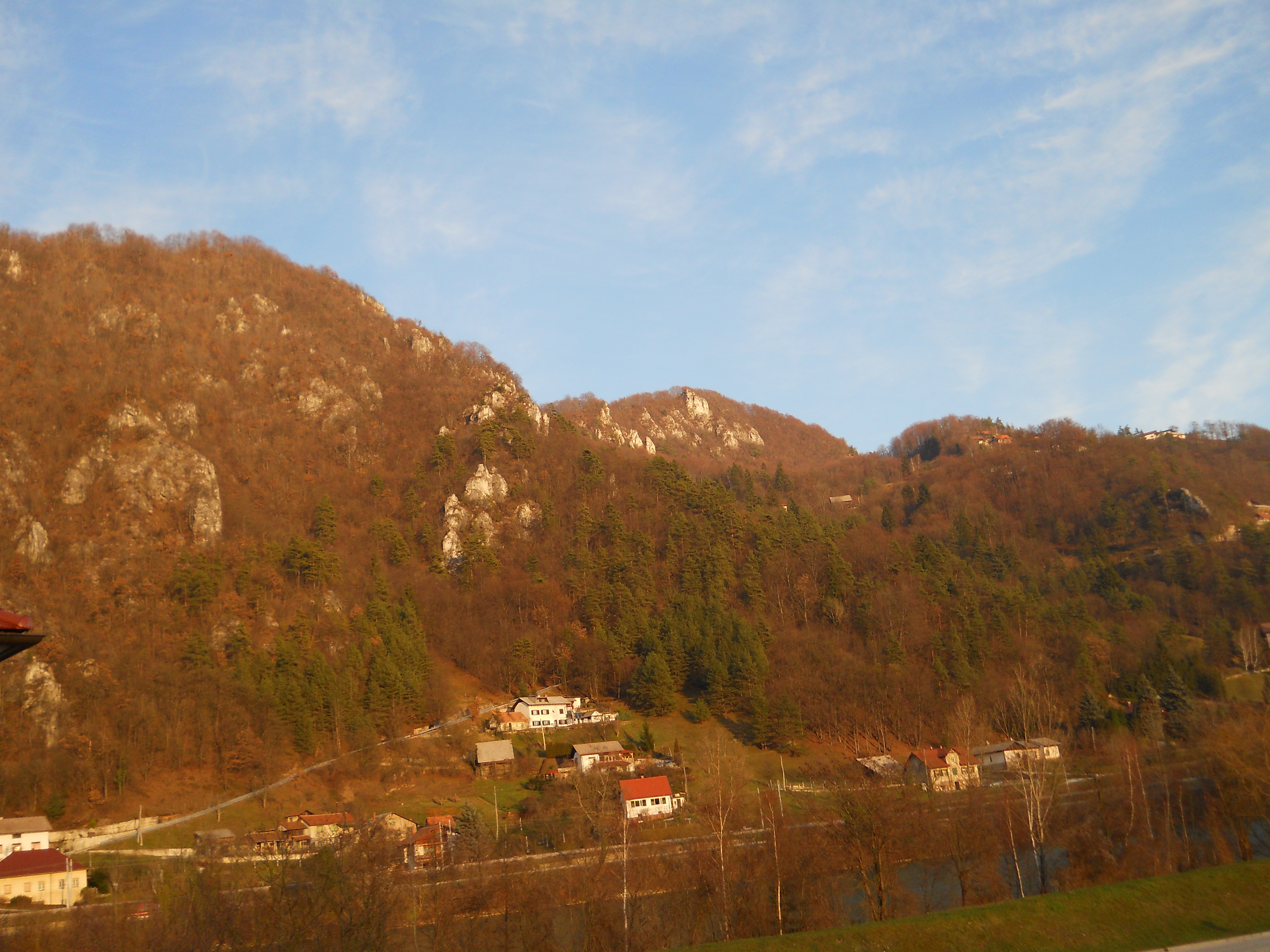

- Location in Slovenia
- Coordinates: 46°3′52.29″N 15°11′34.26″E
- Country: Slovenia
- Traditional region: Lower Styria
- Statistical region: Lower Sava
- Municipality: Radeče

Area
  - Total: 1.62 km^{2} (0.63 sq mi)
- Elevation: 198 m (650 ft)

Population (2002)
  - Total: 166

Obrežje (pronounced [ɔˈbɾeːʒjɛ]) is a settlement in the Municipality of Radeče in central Slovenia. It lies on the left bank of the Sava River and is thus part of the traditional region of Lower Styria, rather than Lower Carniola, where the rest of the municipality on the opposite bank of the river belongs. The entire municipality is now included in the Lower Sava Statistical Region; until January 2014 it was part of the Savinja Statistical Region.

== History ==
Obrežje was formerly part of the neighboring settlement of Obrežje pri Zidanem Mostu in the Municipality of Laško. In 1994, part of that settlement was split off to become the separate settlement of Obrežje in the Municipality of Radeče.

=== Mass grave ===
Obrežje is the site of a mass grave associated with the Second World War. The Bunker Mass Grave (Slovene: Grobišče Bunker) is located in a concrete-sealed bunker on a slope above the house at Obrežje no. 60. The bunker is 8 to 10 meters (26 to 33 ft) long and the entrance is now covered by soil. It contains the remains of an unknown number of Montenegrin Chetnik soldiers.
