= Jelovo =

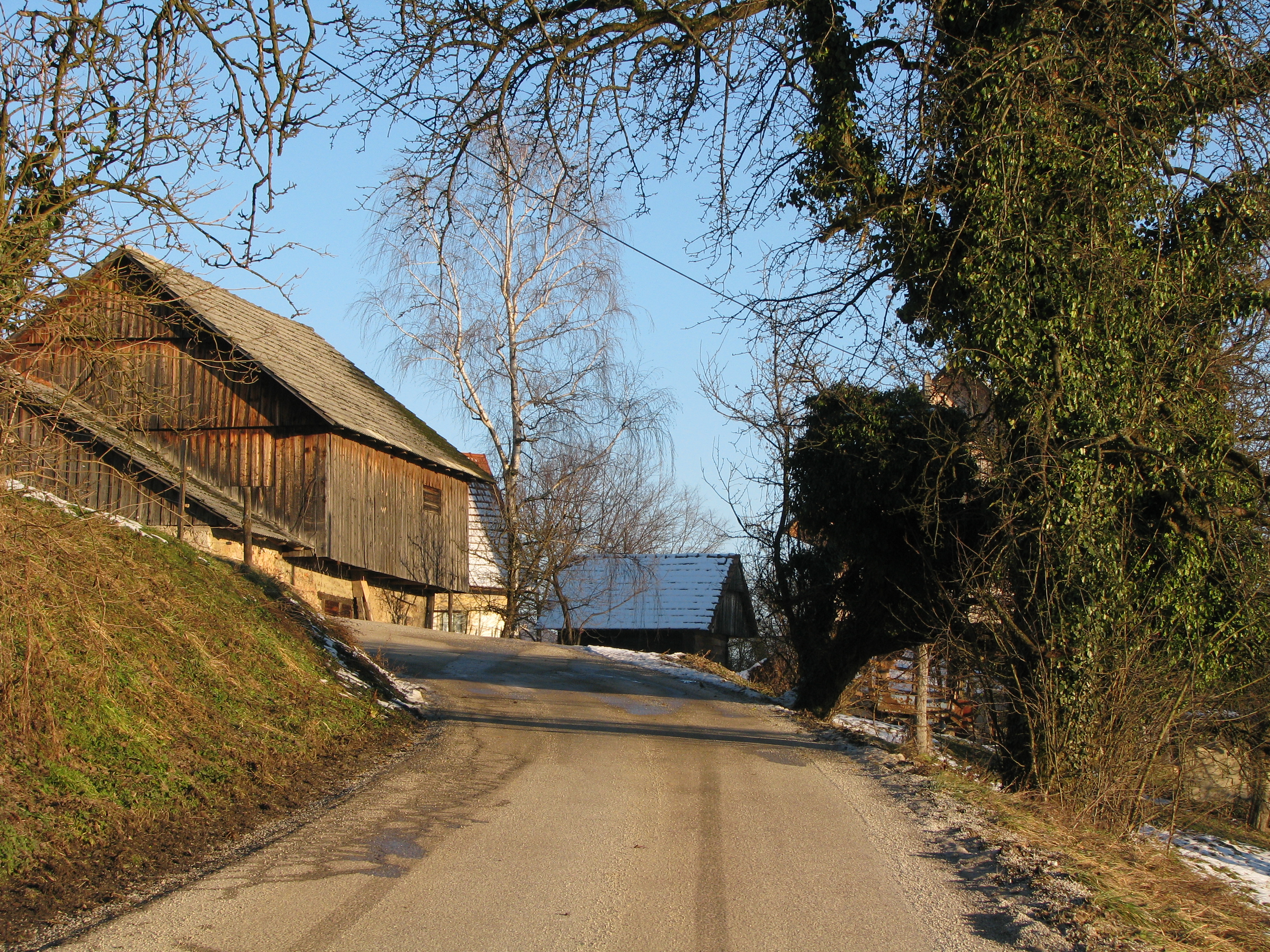

- Location in Slovenia
- Coordinates: 46°4′24.59″N 15°9′1.25″E
- Country: Slovenia
- Traditional region: Lower Carniola
- Statistical region: Lower Sava
- Municipality: Radeče

Area
  - Total: 2.44 km^{2} (0.94 sq mi)
- Elevation: 426.8 m (1,400 ft)

Population (2002)
  - Total: 147

Jelovo (pronounced [jɛˈlɔːʋɔ]) is a settlement in the Municipality of Radeče in eastern Slovenia. It is dispersed in the hills northwest of Radeče in the historical region of Lower Carniola. The municipality is now included in the Lower Sava Statistical Region; until January 2014 it was part of the Savinja Statistical Region.

The local church is dedicated to the Three Kings and belongs to the Parish of Radeče. It dates to around 1520.
