= Njivice =

Njivice may refer to:

- Njivice, Montenegro, a village near Igalo
- Njivice, Croatia, a village near Omišalj
- Njivice, Radeče, a village in Slovenia
