= Borje, Litija =

Borje
- Location in Slovenia
- Coordinates: 46°2′30″N 15°02′40″E
- Country: Slovenia
- Traditional region: Lower Carniola
- Statistical region: Central Sava
- Municipality: Litija
- Elevation: 741 m (2,431 ft)

Borje (pronounced [ˈbɔːɾjɛ]) is a former settlement in the Municipality of Litija in central Slovenia. It is now part of the village of Dobovica. The area is part of the traditional region of Lower Carniola and is now included with the rest of the municipality in the Central Sava Statistical Region.

== Geography ==
Borje stands at the top of a hill southwest of the main part of Dobovica.

== Name ==
The name Borje is derived from the Slovene common noun borje 'pine forest' (< bor 'pine'), referring to the local vegetation.

== History ==
Borje had a population of 85 living in 13 houses in 1900. Dobovica was originally a hamlet of Borje, but this relationship was reversed in 1952, when Borje was made a hamlet of Dobovica, ending its existence as a separate settlement.
