= Radeče =

- Town
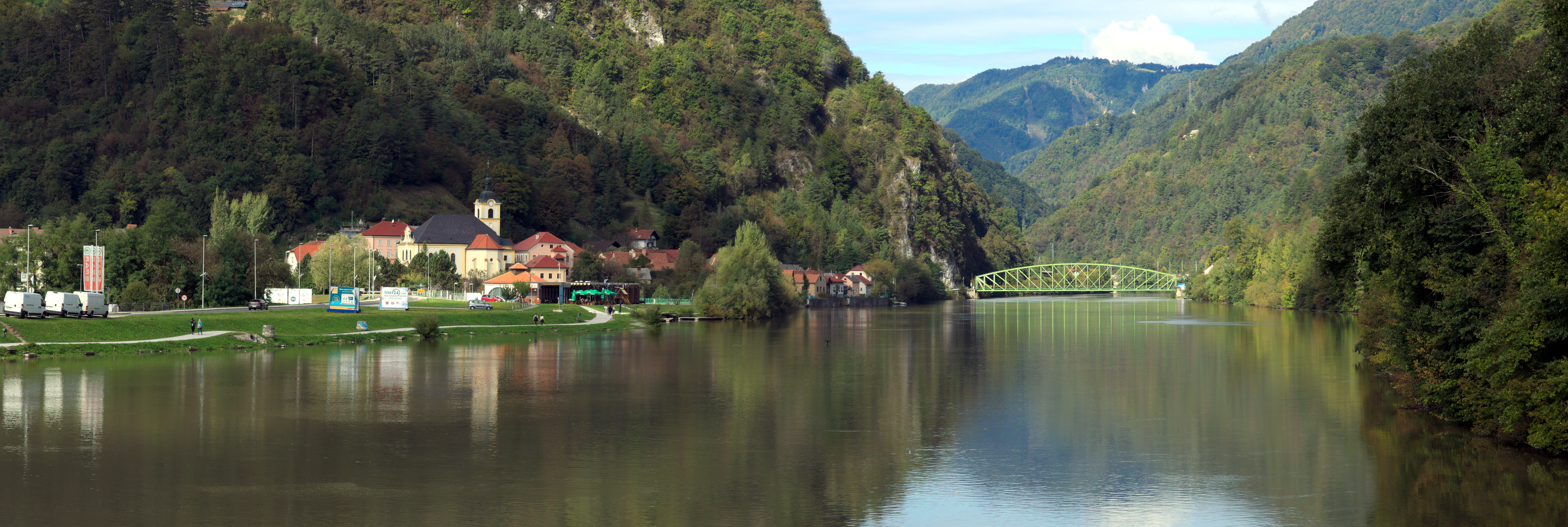
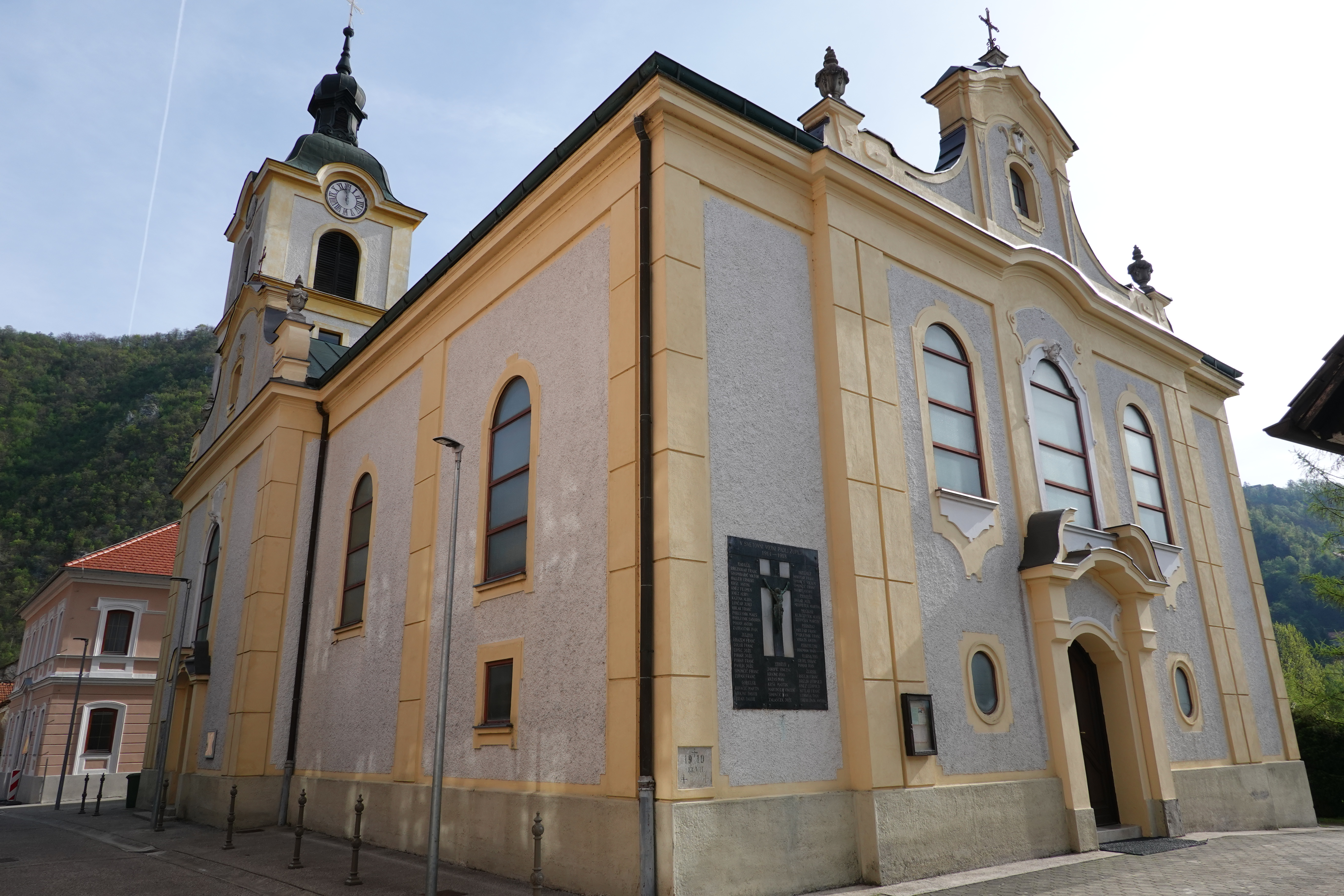
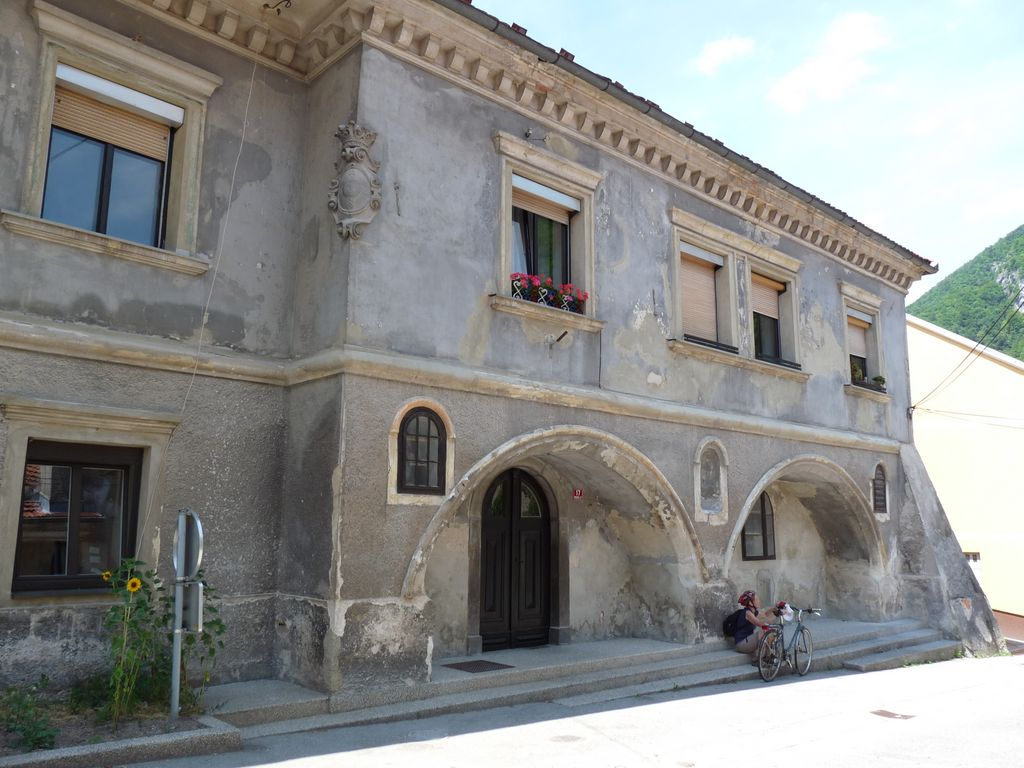
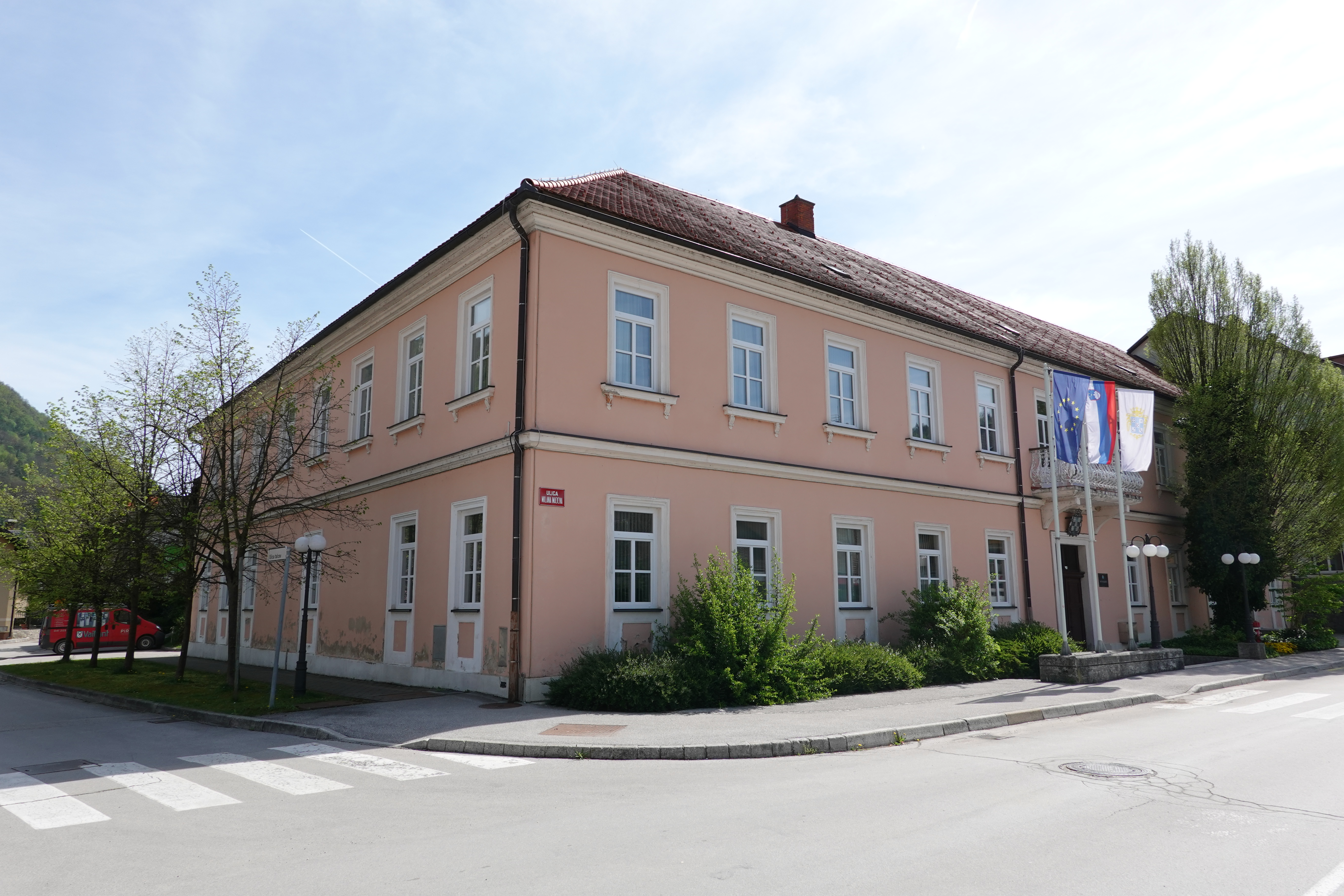
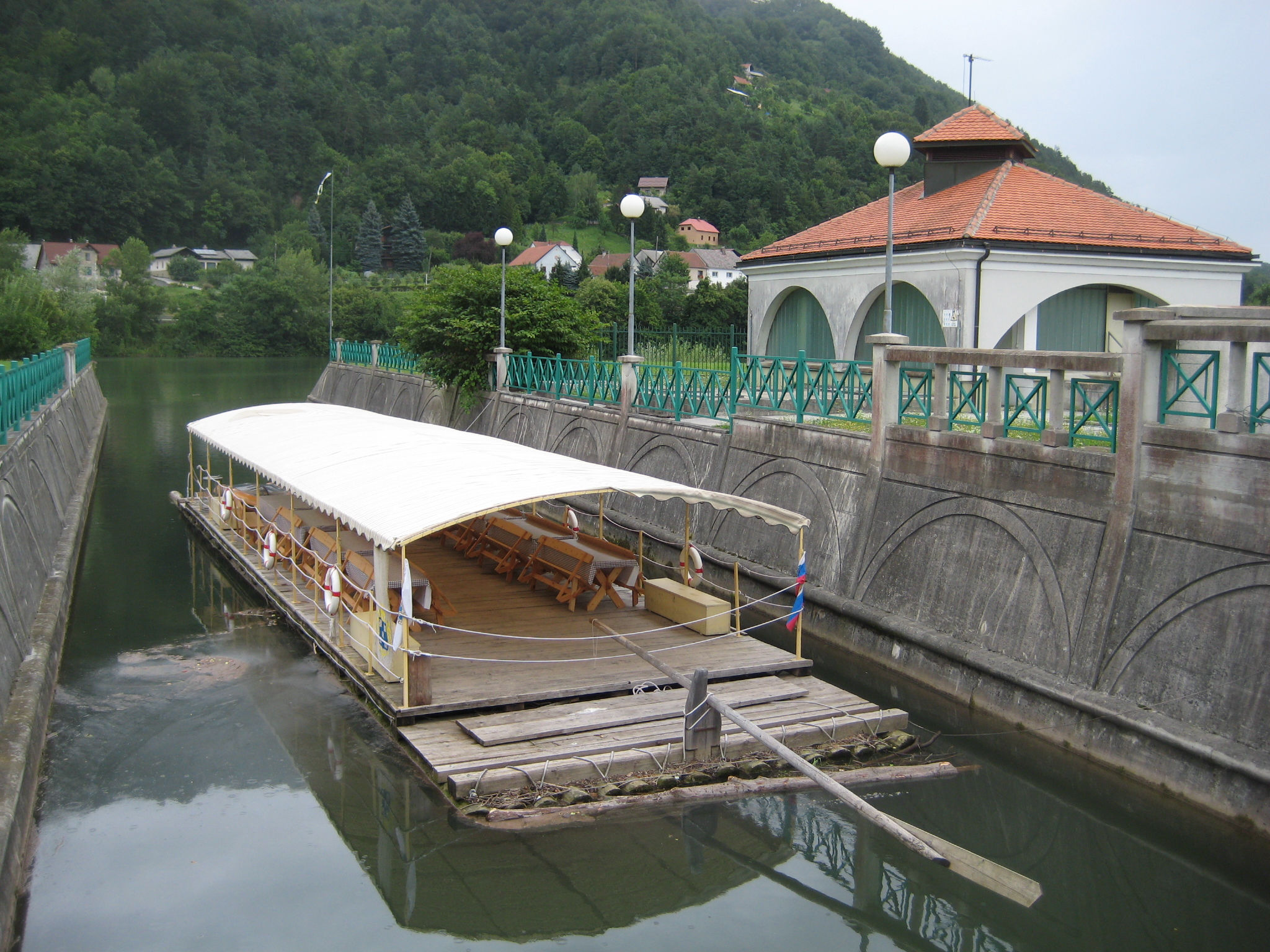
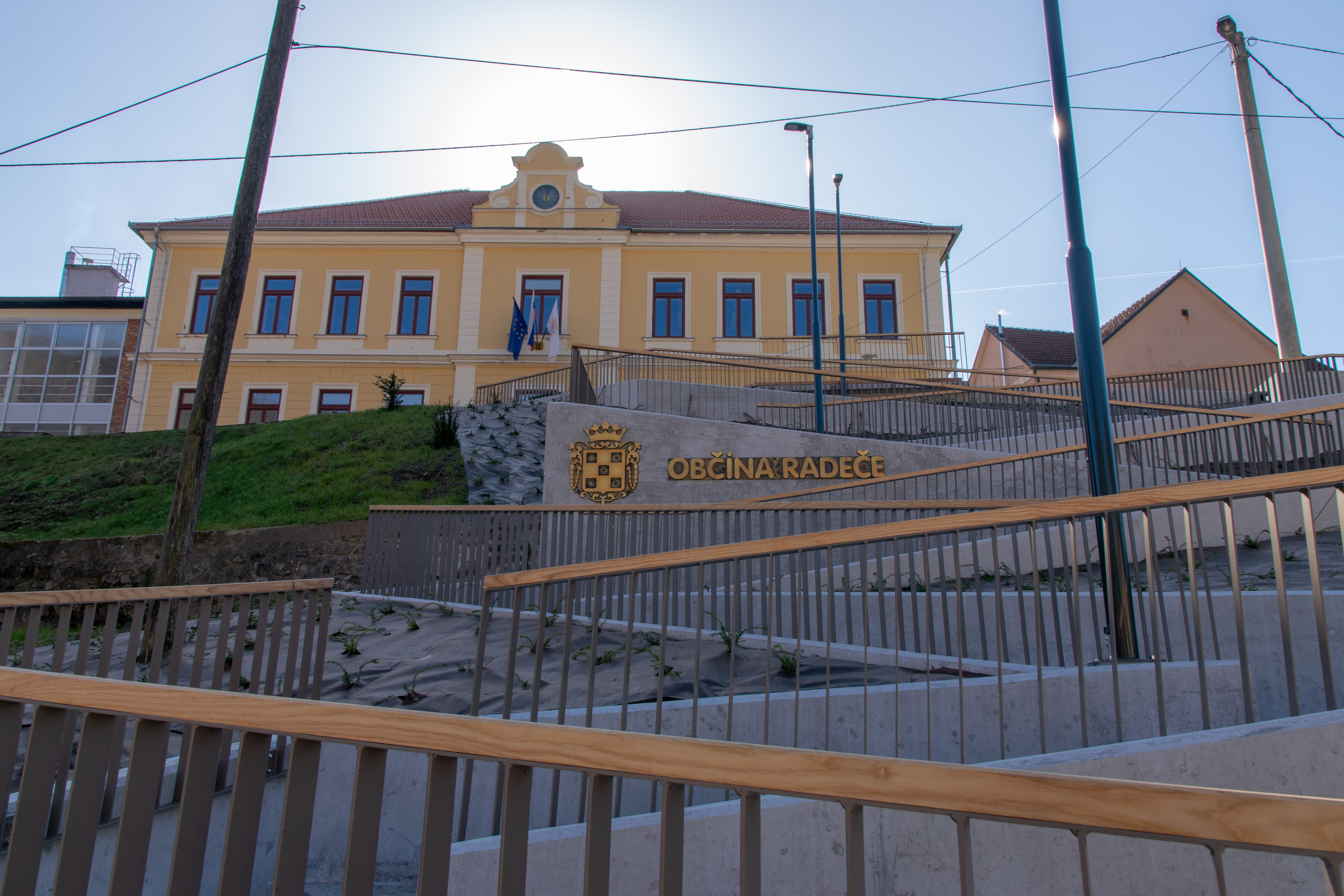
- From top, left to right: Radeče by the river Sava, St. Peter's Church, Turn Manor, Town Hall, Lumber Raft, Stairway to school

- Flag Coat of arms

- Location in Slovenia
- Coordinates: 46°03′57″N 15°10′22″E
- Country: Slovenia
- Traditional region: Lower Carniola
- Statistical region: Lower Sava
- Municipality: Radeče

Area
  - Total: 2.90 km^{2} (1.12 sq mi)
- Elevation: 194.1 m (637 ft)

Population (2022)
  - Total: 1,939

Radeče (pronounced [ˈɾàːdɛtʃɛ]; German: Ratschach) is a small town in the Lower Sava Valley in eastern Slovenia. It is located in the Sava Hills (Slovene: Posavsko hribovje) on the right bank of the Sava River at the confluence with Sopota Creek. It is the seat of the Municipality of Radeče and part of the traditional province of Lower Carniola. The town and the municipality are now included in the Lower Sava Statistical Region; until January 2014 they were part of the Savinja Statistical Region.

== History ==
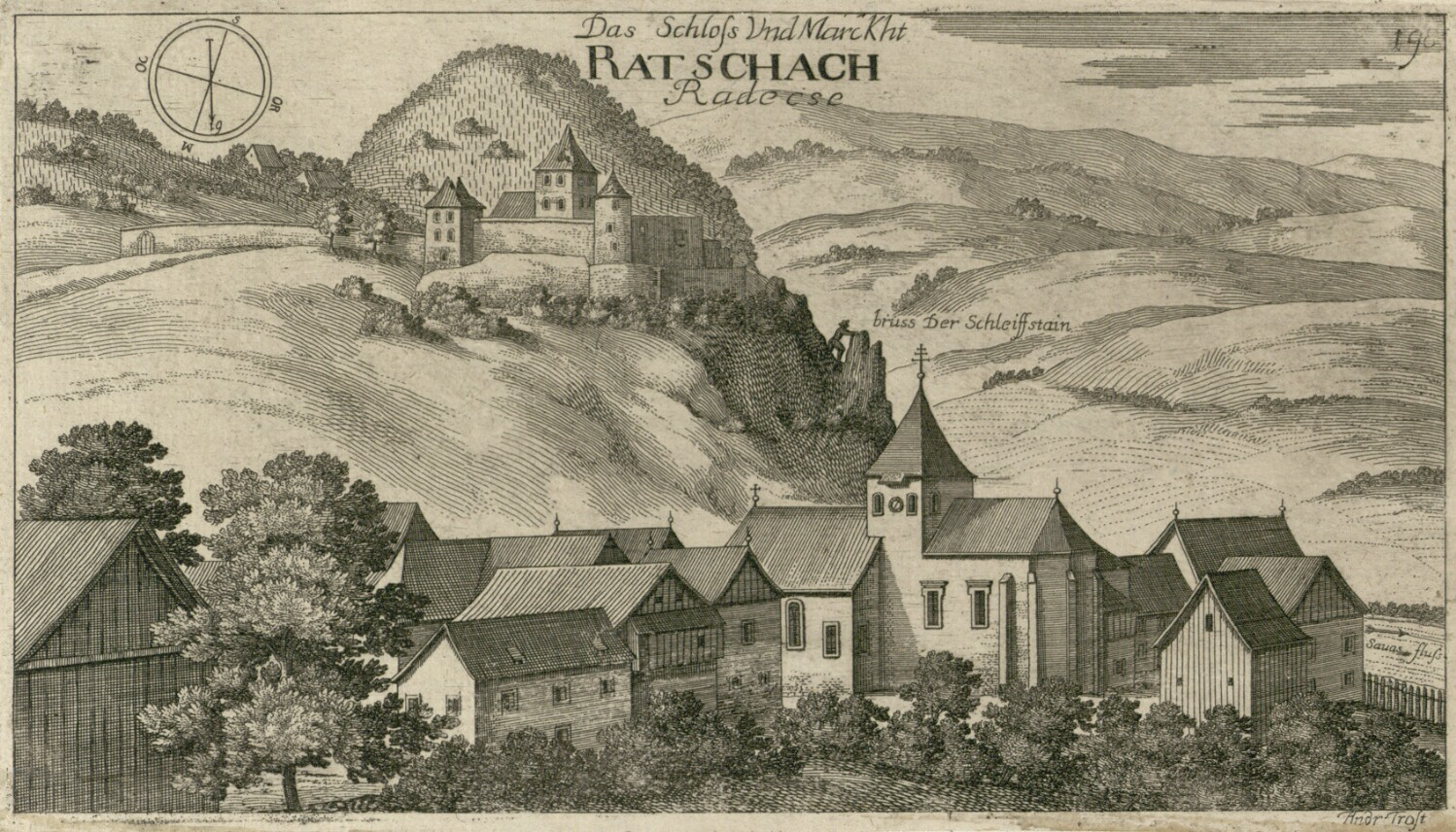
Radeče (Ratschach), second half of the 17th century, copper engraving by Johann Weikhard von Valvasor

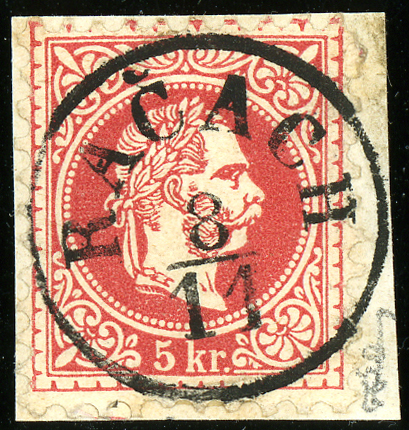
Ratschach postmark c. 1867. Note the hybrid spelling Račach.

Archaeological finds in the area, including such items as bone tools, cave bear bones, altars to water gods, and an altar to the goddess Adsaluta and god Savus indicate that it has a long history of human occupation. Radeče was first mentioned in written documents dating to 1297. The town was granted market rights in 1338.

Until 1918, the town was part of the Austrian monarchy (Cisleithania after the compromise of 1867), in the Gurkfeld (Krško) district, one of the 11 Bezirkshauptmannschaften in the province of Carniola.

In 1925, Radeče was formally given town status by a decree issued by King Alexander. In 1994, it became the seat of the Municipality of Radeče.

== Landmarks ==
=== Church ===
The parish church in the town is dedicated to Saint Peter and belongs to the Roman Catholic Archdiocese of Ljubljana. It was built in 1911 on the site of an earlier church. The Gothic chancel of the former church has been incorporated into the new one as a side chapel at its eastern side. The bell tower stands at the western side of the church.

Historical population
Year	Pop.	±%
1948	1,191	—
1953	1,266	+6.3%
1961	1,500	+18.5%
1971	1,645	+9.7%
1981	1,980	+20.4%
1991	2,465	+24.5%
2002	2,296	−6.9%
2011	2,168	−5.6%
2021	1,949	−10.1%
Population size may be affected by changes in administrative divisions.

== Bridges ==
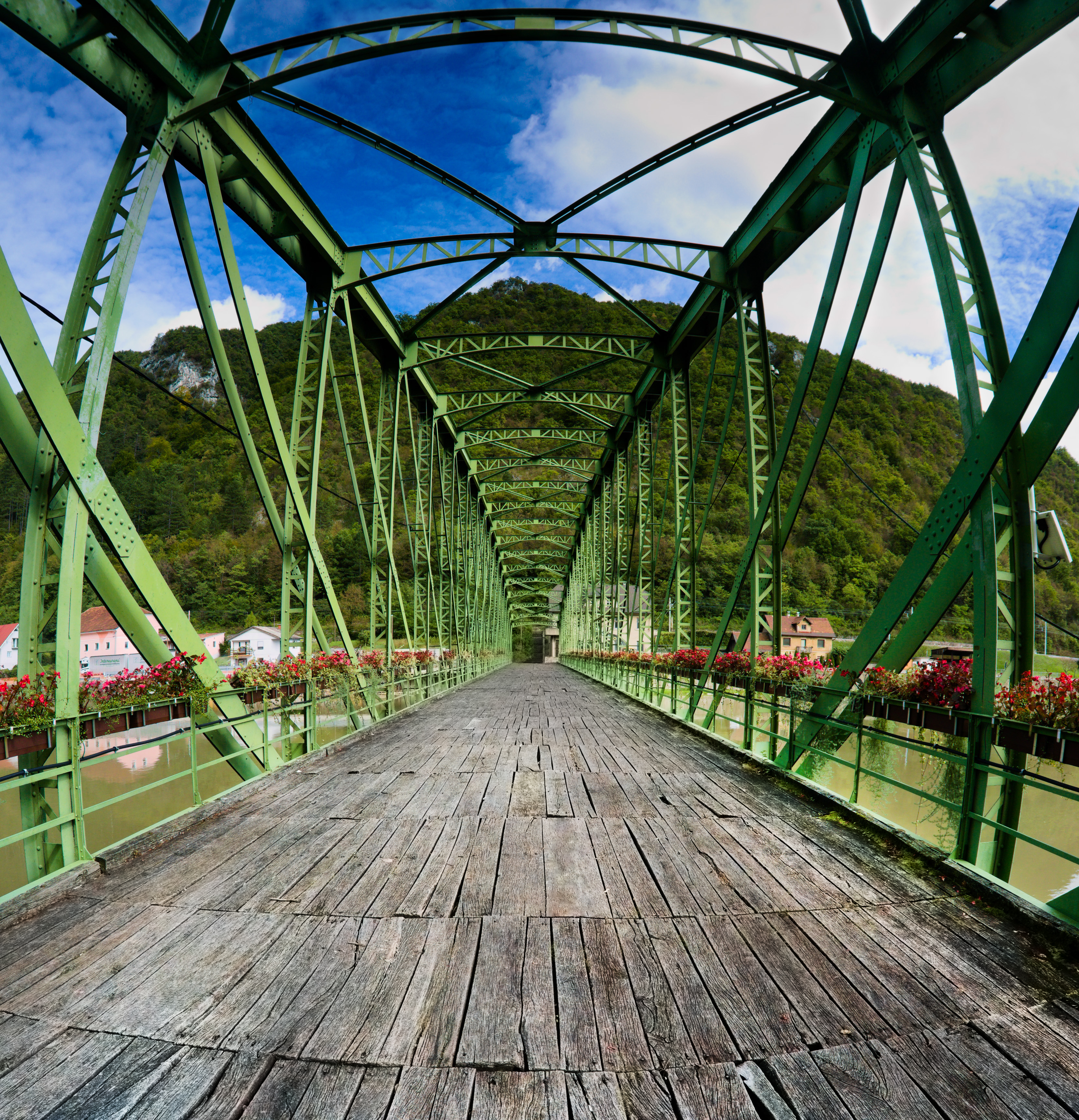
The Radeče Iron Bridge was built in 1893 and 1894 based on a plan by the Czech architect Jan Vladimír Hráský. It is protected as a cultural monument of local significance.

An old one-arch iron road bridge links the town center of Radeče with an old railway station on the other side of the Sava. It was built in the time of Austria-Hungary and originally linked the crown lands of Carniola and Styria. It was designed by the Czech architect Jan Vladimír Hráský. Its construction started in September 1893 and was completed in August 1894. It was open for traffic in June 1894.

The riveted bridge is 84 metres (276 ft) long and 6 m (20 ft) wide and originally had a bearing strength of 12 tonnes (12 long tons; 13 short tons), but was reinforced after World War II. Its steel construction was made by the Griedl company from Vienna, whereas its supporting foundations were made by the builder Tršek from Šmarjeta. Since 1980, when a staircase was added to it on the left bank, it has been used only by pedestrians and cyclists.

A new concrete road bridge across the Sava in Radeče stands near Hotemež. It is 133 m (436 ft) long and 10.5 m (34 ft) wide. It was constructed by the Ingrad corporation (TOZD Laško branch) and was solemnly opened in December 1980.

=== Weixelstein Castle ===
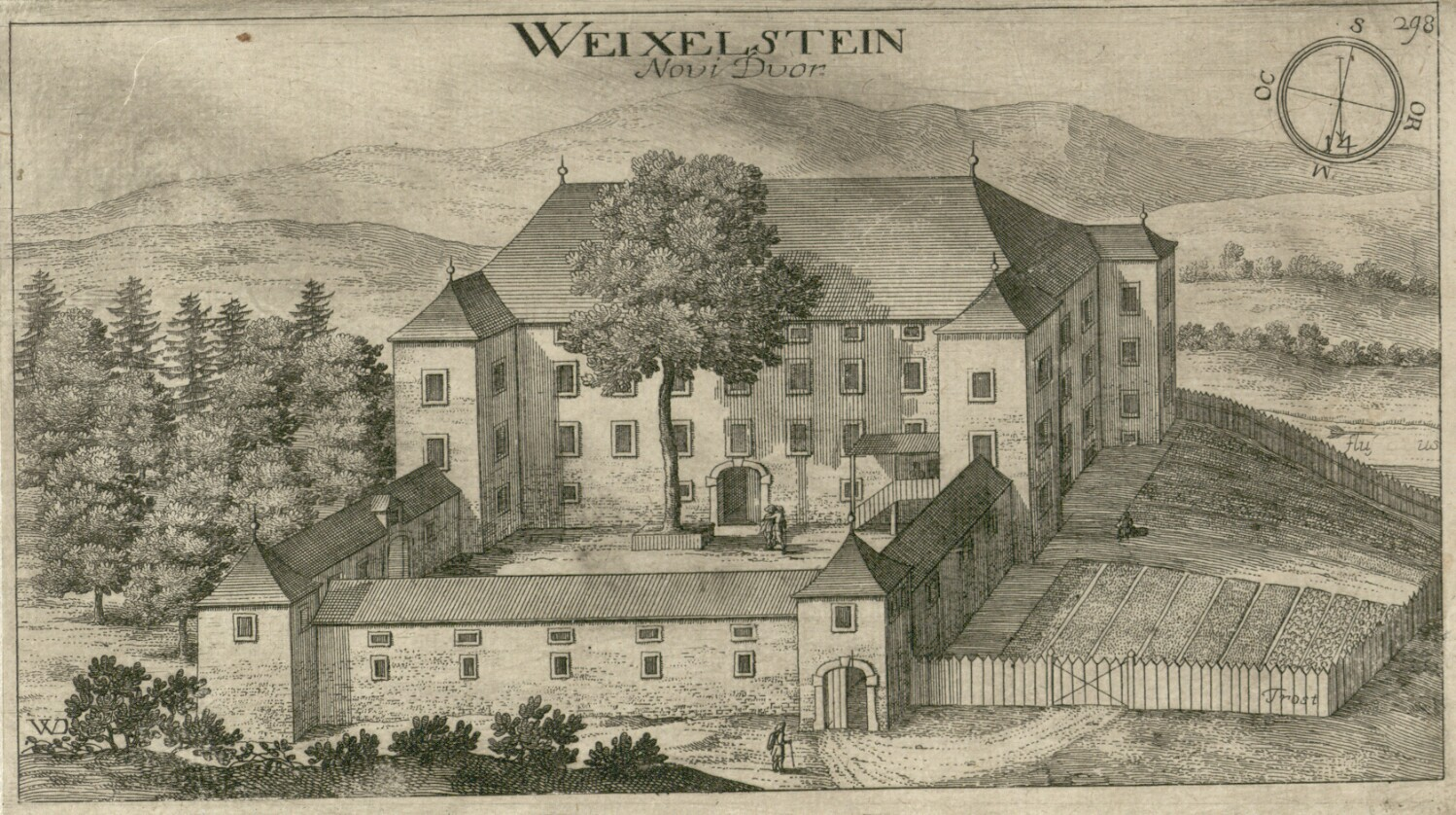
Weixelstein Castle (Novi dvor) as depicted by Valvasor in 1679

Weixelstein Castle (Slovene: Dvor or Novi dvor) stands east of Radeče at Pot na Brod no. 23. It is a four-winged two-story structure with an arcade courtyard. The building mainly dates from the 16th century, and the courtyard from the 17th century. Some wooden ceilings are preserved in the interior. The castle park originally had a geometric pattern, but was redesigned in a landscaped style in the 18th century. The castle's 16th-century owner Johann von Weixelstein sold it to Christoph von Raumschussl (or Rambschüssel) in 1595, after which it was owned by the Zetschker family, the Augustinians of Ljubljana, Franz Johann von Amigoni, Anton Gollmayer, the Plusk family, and Ludwig Guttmannsthal-Benvenuti. It was purchased by the Ljubljana-based Daughters of Charity of Saint Vincent de Paul in 1926. The nuns were evicted by German forces during the Second World War. After the war, the property was nationalized and converted into a reform school.

== Economy ==
The community's development is closely connected to the Sava River because it used to be an important traffic route for water transport. The confluence of the Sava and Savinja in nearby Zidani Most gave Radeče a role of the central rafting port. This tradition is preserved by modern Radeče rafters, who nurture memories of the customs of their ancestors at the annual event Rafting Days on the Sava (Dnevi splavarjenja na Savi).

The town has a long-standing papermaking tradition. Historically, it was believed to have started in 1736, but recent archival research has confirmed that paper production in the Sopot Valley began as early as 1725.

For a detailed historical analysis, see: The Beginnings of the Radeče Paper Mill (in Slovenian)

Radeče has been renowned for its paper industry, and has modern foundations for development in its rich cultural heritage and unspoiled nature. After the paper producer entered bankruptcy proceedings in April 2012, a new company was established in June 2012.
