= Onkraj Meže =

- Location in Slovenia
- Coordinates: 46°31′13.16″N 14°51′47.85″E
- Country: Slovenia
- Traditional region: Carinthia
- Statistical region: Carinthia
- Municipality: Mežica

Area
  - Total: 3.7 km^{2} (1.4 sq mi)
- Elevation: 573.7 m (1,882 ft)

Population (2002)
  - Total: 87

Onkraj Meže (pronounced [ˈoːŋkɾai̯ ˈmeːʒɛ]) is a dispersed settlement in the hills above the right bank of the Meža River in the Municipality of Mežica in the Carinthia region in northern Slovenia.
