= Podkraj pri Mežici =

- Location in Slovenia
- Coordinates: 46°31′35.05″N 14°50′7.84″E
- Country: Slovenia
- Traditional region: Carinthia
- Statistical region: Carinthia
- Municipality: Mežica

Area
  - Total: 7.24 km^{2} (2.80 sq mi)
- Elevation: 615.2 m (2,018 ft)

Population (2002)
  - Total: 130

Podkraj pri Mežici (pronounced [ˈpoːtkɾai̯ pɾi mɛˈʒiːtsi]) is a dispersed settlement northwest of Mežica in the Carinthia region in northern Slovenia.

== Name ==
The name of the settlement was changed from Podkraj to Podkraj pri Mežici in 1955.
