= Njivice, Radeče =

Njivice
- Location in Slovenia
- Coordinates: 46°3′50.93″N 15°8′39.29″E
- Country: Slovenia
- Traditional region: Lower Carniola
- Statistical region: Lower Sava
- Municipality: Radeče

Area
  - Total: 0.48 km^{2} (0.19 sq mi)
- Elevation: 251.2 m (824 ft)

Population (2002)
  - Total: 119

Njivice (pronounced [ˈnjiːʋitsɛ]; German: Niwitz) is a small settlement in the Municipality of Radeče in eastern Slovenia. It lies on Sopota Creek west of the town of Radeče. The area is part of the historical region of Lower Carniola. The municipality is now included in the Lower Sava Statistical Region; until January 2014 it was part of the Savinja Statistical Region.
