= Brunk, Radeče =

Brunk
- Location in Slovenia
- Coordinates: 46°2′24.24″N 15°10′55.81″E
- Country: Slovenia
- Traditional region: Lower Carniola
- Statistical region: Lower Sava
- Municipality: Radeče

Area
  - Total: 1.57 km^{2} (0.61 sq mi)
- Elevation: 465.4 m (1,527 ft)

Population (2002)
  - Total: 12

Brunk (pronounced [ˈbɾuːŋk]; in older sources also Brunik) is a small settlement in the Municipality of Radeče in southeastern Slovenia. The area is part of the historical region of Lower Carniola. The municipality is now included in the Lower Sava Statistical Region; until January 2014, Brunk was part of the Savinja Statistical Region.

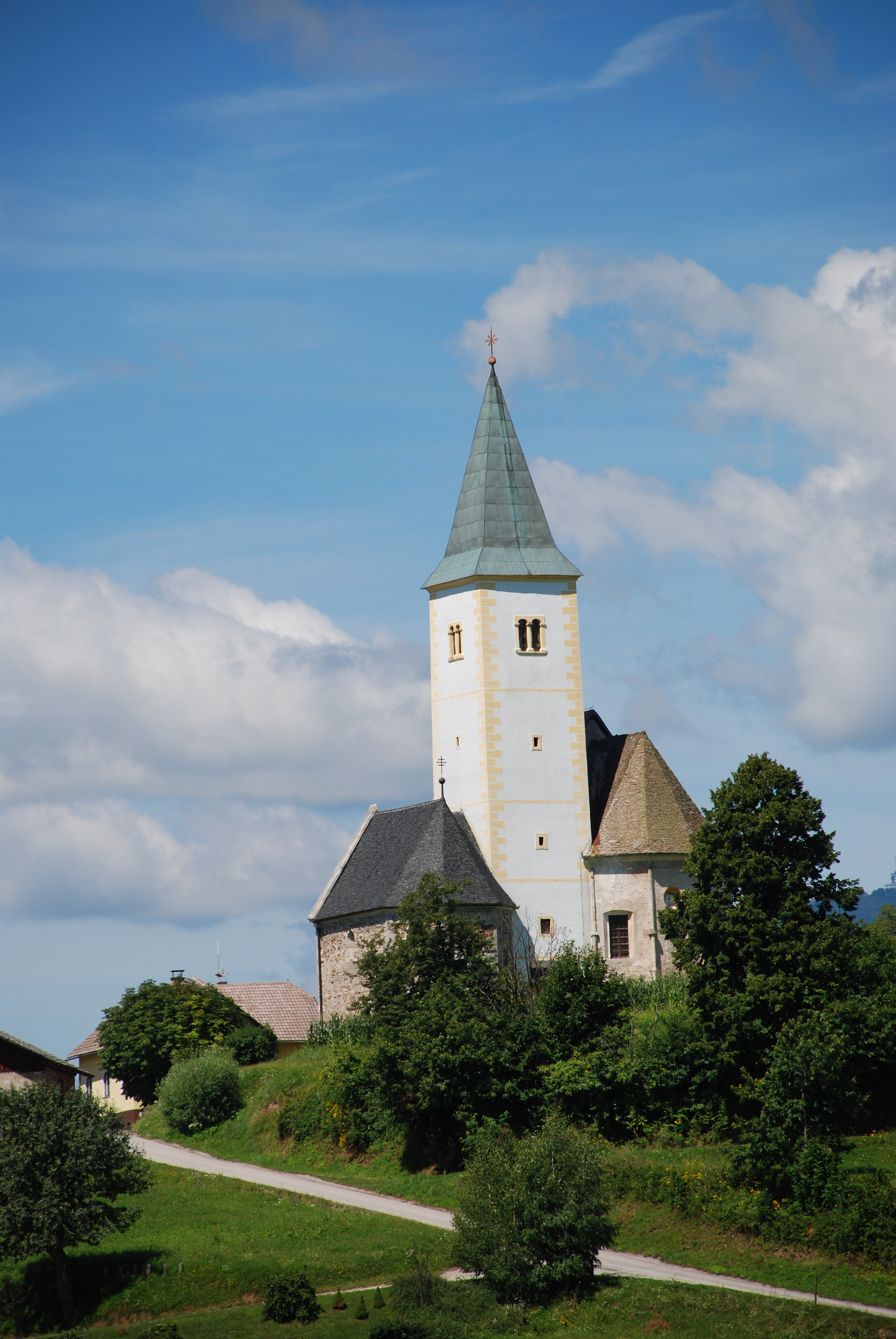
Holy Magi Church in Brunk

The local church is dedicated to the Hoy Magi and belongs to the Parish of Radeče. It dates to around 1520.
