= Sopota, Litija =

Sopota
- Location in Slovenia
- Coordinates: 46°3′34.06″N 15°2′48.89″E
- Country: Slovenia
- Traditional region: Lower Carniola
- Statistical region: Central Sava
- Municipality: Litija

Area
  - Total: 1.04 km^{2} (0.40 sq mi)
- Elevation: 543.9 m (1,784 ft)
- Postal code: 1414

Sopota (pronounced [sɔˈpoːta]) is a small dispersed settlement north of Dole pri Litiji in the Municipality of Litija in central Slovenia. The area is part of the traditional region of Lower Carniola and is now included with the rest of the municipality in the Central Sava Statistical Region.

== History ==
Sopota was a hamlet of Dobovica until 1995, when it became a separate settlement.
