= Zavrate =

- Location in Slovenia
- Coordinates: 46°4′56.28″N 15°9′36.25″E
- Country: Slovenia
- Traditional region: Lower Carniola
- Statistical region: Lower Sava
- Municipality: Radeče

Area
  - Total: 2.6 km^{2} (1.0 sq mi)
- Elevation: 520.6 m (1,708 ft)

Population (2002)
  - Total: 26

Zavrate (pronounced [zaˈwɾaːtɛ]) is a dispersed settlement in the Municipality of Radeče in eastern Slovenia. It lies in the hills above the right bank of the Sava River in the historical region of Lower Carniola. The municipality is now included in the Lower Sava Statistical Region; until January 2014 it was part of the Savinja Statistical Region.

== History ==
Zavrate was formerly a hamlet of neighboring Podkraj. It was separated from Podkraj and made an independent settlement in 1986.

== Cultural heritage ==
Archaeological evidence of a Roman settlement in the area indicates that the Romans built a bridge over the Sava River at its confluence with the Savinja.
