= Hotemež =

- Location in Slovenia
- Coordinates: 46°3′15.03″N 15°11′36.92″E
- Country: Slovenia
- Traditional region: Lower Carniola
- Statistical region: Lower Sava
- Municipality: Radeče

Area
  - Total: 2.23 km^{2} (0.86 sq mi)
- Elevation: 211.8 m (695 ft)

Population (2002)
  - Total: 89

Hotemež (pronounced [xɔˈteːmɛʃ]; German: Hitemesch) is a settlement on the right bank of the Sava River in the Municipality of Radeče in eastern Slovenia. The area is part of the historical region of Lower Carniola. The municipality is now included in the Lower Sava Statistical Region; until January 2014 it was part of the Savinja Statistical Region.
