= Municipality of Mežica =

Municipality of Slovenia

Municipality of Mežica Občina Mežica
- Municipality
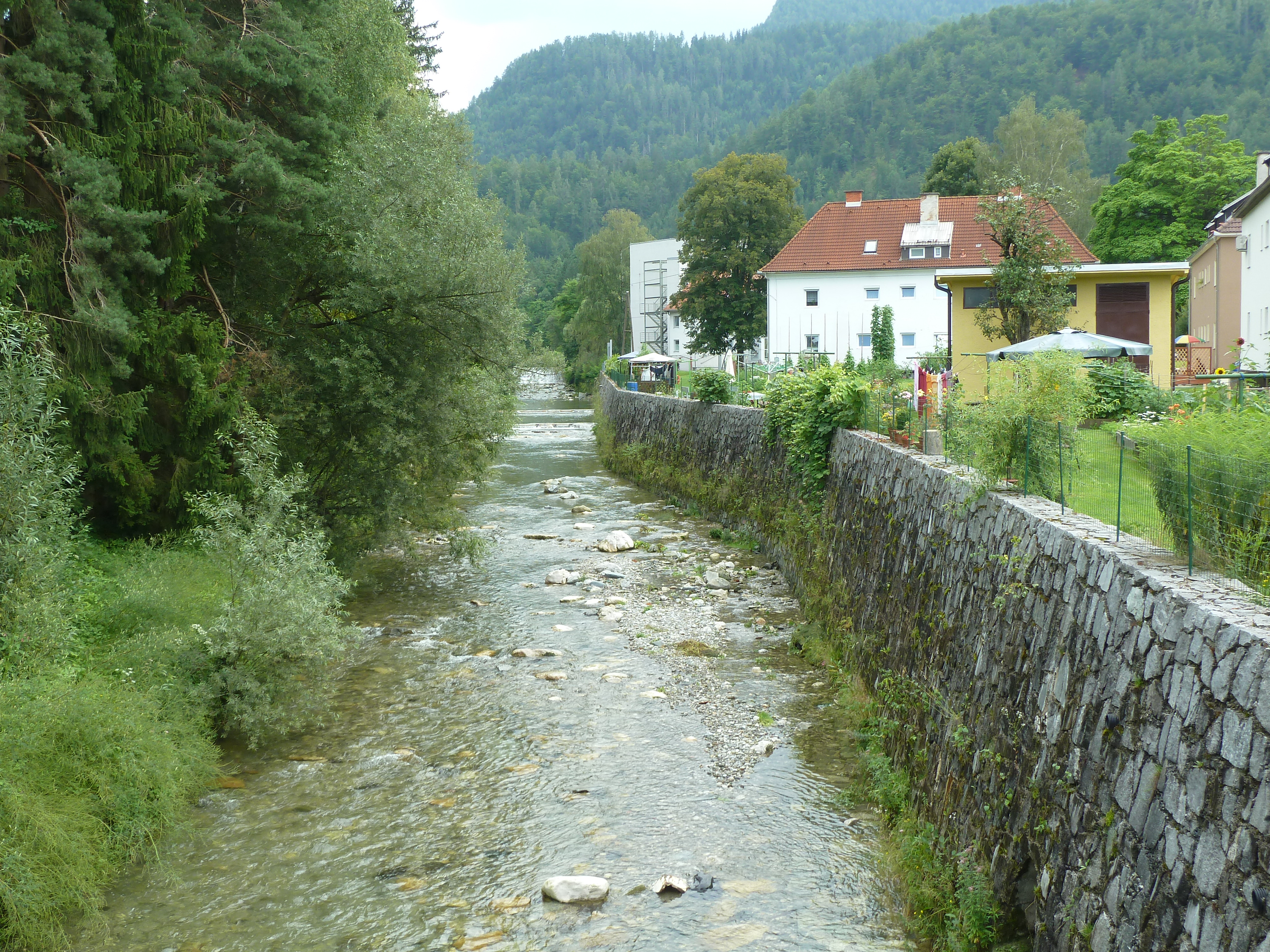

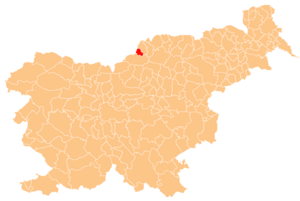
- Location of the Municipality of Mežica in Slovenia
- Coordinates: 46°31′N 14°51′E
- Country: Slovenia

Government
  - Mayor: Dušan Krebel (Independent)

Area
  - Total: 26.4 km^{2} (10.2 sq mi)

Population (2016)
  - Total: 3,573
  - Density: 135/km^{2} (351/sq mi)
- Time zone: UTC+01 (CET)
  - Summer (DST): UTC+02 (CEST)
- Website: www.mezica.si

The Municipality of Mežica (pronounced [mɛˈʒiːtsa]; Slovene: Občina Mežica) is a municipality in the traditional region of Carinthia in northern Slovenia. The seat of the municipality is the town of Mežica. Mežica became a municipality in 1994. It borders Austria.

== Settlements ==
In addition to the municipal seat of Mežica, the municipality also includes the following settlements:

- Breg
- Lom
- Onkraj Meže
- Plat
- Podkraj pri Mežici
