= Potkraj =

Potkraj may refer to the following places in Bosnia and Herzegovina:

- Potkraj, Breza, a village in the municipality of Brezi
- Potkraj, Donji Vakuf, a village in the municipality of Donjem Vakuf
- Potkraj, Kiseljak, a village in the municipality of Kiseljak
- Potkraj, Livno, a village in the municipality of Livno
- Potkraj, Široki Brijeg, a village in the municipality of Širokom Brijeg

== See also ==
- Podkraj (disambiguation)
