= Battle of Podhajce =

Battle of Podhajce may refer to:

- Battle of Podhajce (1667)
- Battle of Podhajce (1698)
