= Municipality of Radeče =

Municipality of Slovenia

Municipality of Radeče Občina Radeče
- Municipality
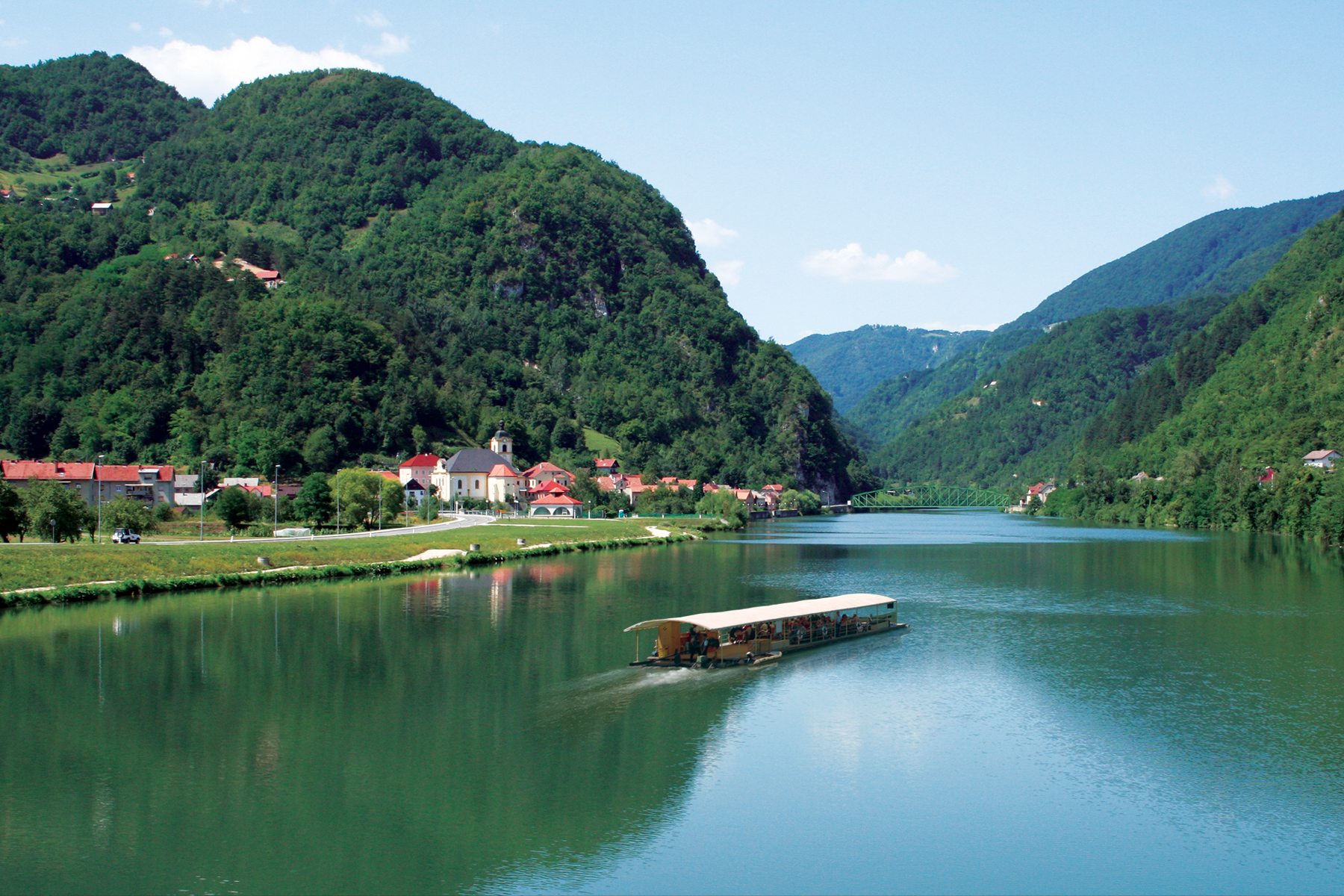

- Flag Coat of arms

- Location of the Municipality of Radeče in Slovenia
- Coordinates: 46°4′N 15°9′E
- Country: Slovenia

Government
  - Mayor: Tomaž Režun (SD)

Area
  - Total: 52.0 km^{2} (20.1 sq mi)

Population (July 1, 2018)
  - Total: 4,202
  - Density: 80.8/km^{2} (209/sq mi)
- Time zone: UTC+01 (CET)
  - Summer (DST): UTC+02 (CEST)
- Website: www.radece.si

The Municipality of Radeče (pronounced [ˈɾaːdɛtʃɛ]; Slovene: Občina Radeče) is a municipality in central Slovenia. Its seat is the town of Radeče. The area is part of the traditional region of Lower Carniola. It is now included in the Lower Sava Statistical Region. Radeče became a municipality in 1994.

== Settlements ==
In addition to the municipal seat of Radeče, the municipality also includes the following settlements:

- Brunk
- Brunška Gora
- Čimerno
- Dobrava
- Goreljce
- Hotemež
- Jagnjenica
- Jelovo
- Log pri Vrhovem
- Loška Gora
- Močilno
- Njivice
- Obrežje
- Počakovo
- Prapretno
- Rudna Vas
- Stari Dvor
- Svibno
- Vrhovo
- Zagrad
- Zavrate
- Žebnik
