= Podgaj, Srebrenica =

Podgaj
- Village
- Location within Bosnia and Herzegovina
- Coordinates: 44°07′03″N 19°09′34″E
- Country: Bosnia and Herzegovina
- Municipality: Srebrenica
- Time zone: UTC+1 (CET)
  - Summer (DST): UTC+2 (CEST)

Podgaj (Serbian: Подгај) is a village in the municipality of Srebrenica, Bosnia and Herzegovina.
