= Podgaje =

Podgaje may refer to the following places:

- Podgaje, Greater Poland Voivodeship (west-central Poland)
- Podgaje, Busko County in Świętokrzyskie Voivodeship (south-central Poland)
- Podgaje, Kazimierza County in Świętokrzyskie Voivodeship (south-central Poland)
