= Vrhovo pri Šentlovrencu =

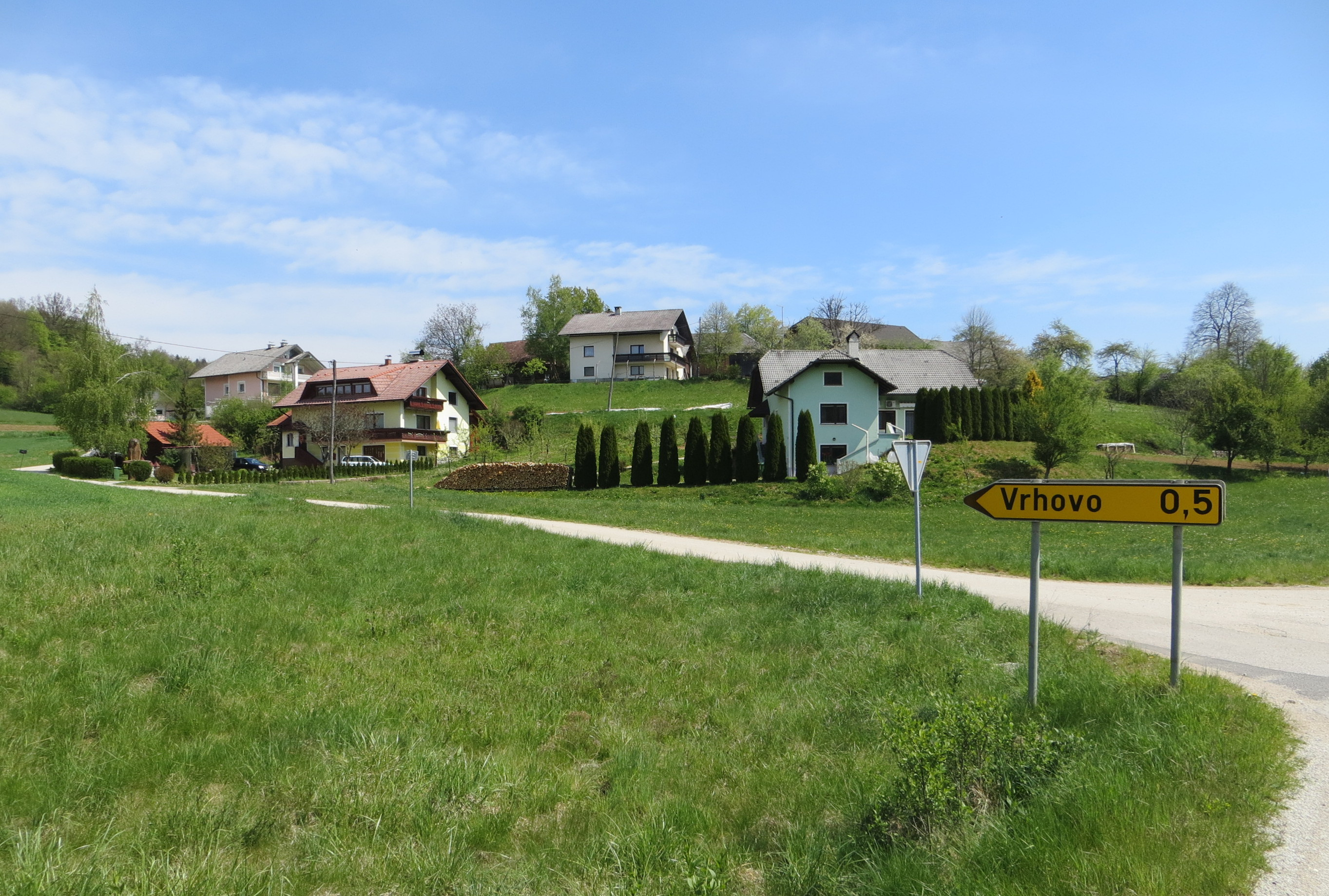

- Location in Slovenia
- Coordinates: 45°56′17.38″N 14°55′40.91″E
- Country: Slovenia
- Traditional region: Lower Carniola
- Statistical region: Southeast Slovenia
- Municipality: Trebnje

Area
  - Total: 0.51 km^{2} (0.20 sq mi)
- Elevation: 310.5 m (1,019 ft)

Population (2002)
  - Total: 38

Vrhovo pri Šentlovrencu (pronounced [ʋəɾˈxɔːʋɔ pɾi ʃɛnˈtloːu̯ɾɛntsu] or [ʋəɾˈxɔːʋɔ pɾi ʃənˈtloːu̯ɾɛntsu]; German: Werchow) is a small settlement in the Municipality of Trebnje in eastern Slovenia. It lies on the left bank of the Temenica River west of Šentlovrenc. The area is part of the historical region of Lower Carniola. The municipality is now included in the Southeast Slovenia Statistical Region.

== Name ==
The name of the settlement was changed from Vrhovo to Vrhovo pri Šentlovrencu in 1953. In the past the German name was Werchow.
