= Podkraj, Travnik =

Podkraj
- Village
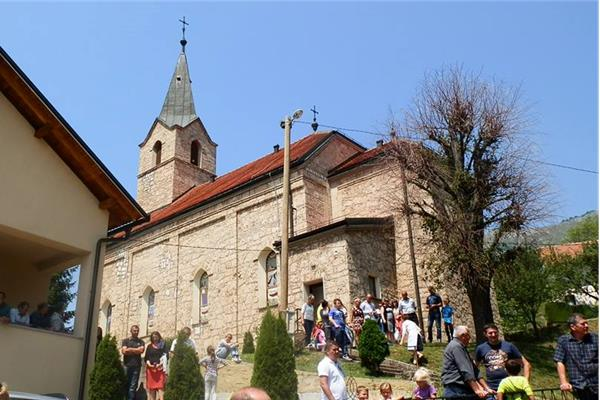

- Location within Bosnia and Herzegovina
- Coordinates: 44.2579545°N 17.5550697°E
- Country: Bosnia and Herzegovina
- Entity: Federation of Bosnia and Herzegovina
- Canton: Central Bosnia
- Municipality: Travnik

Area
  - Total: 0.89 sq mi (2.30 km^{2})

Population (2013)
  - Total: 507
  - Density: 571/sq mi (220/km^{2})
- Time zone: UTC+1 (CET)
  - Summer (DST): UTC+2 (CEST)

Podkraj is a village in the municipality of Travnik, Bosnia and Herzegovina.

== Demographics ==
According to the 2013 census, its population was 507.

Ethnicity in 2013
Ethnicity	Number	Percentage
Croats	455	89.7%
Bosniaks	49	9.7%
Serbs	1	0.2%
other/undeclared	2	0.4%
Total	507	100%
