= Svibno =

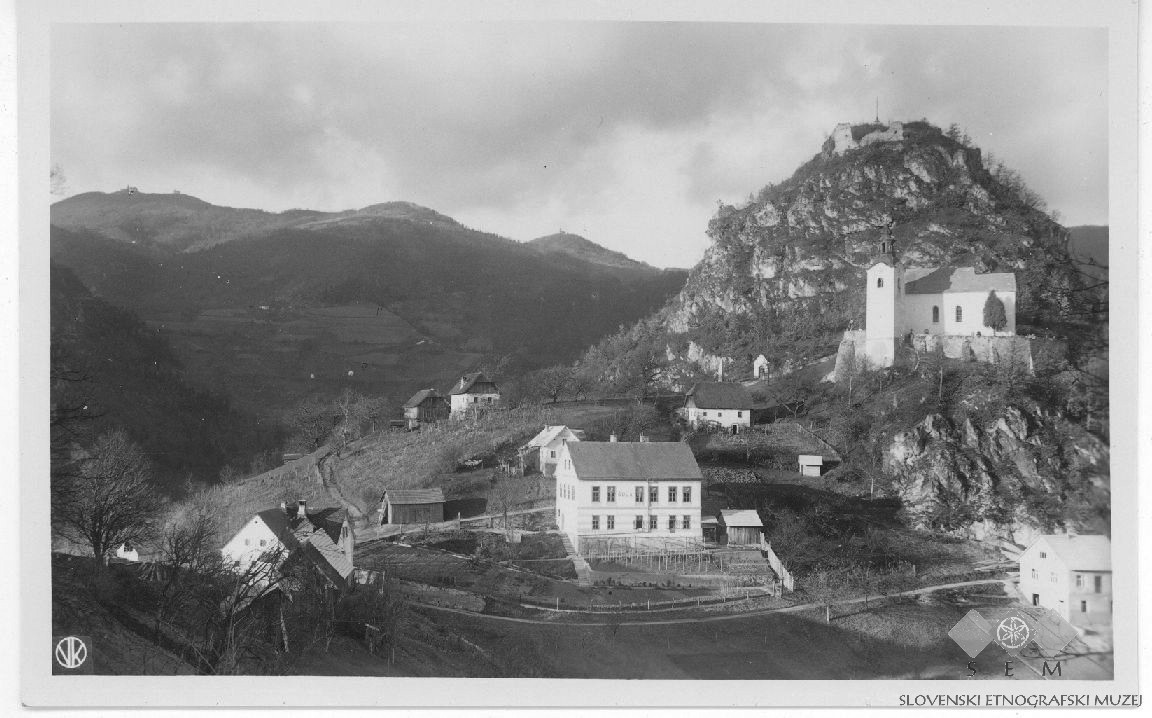
- Postcard of Svibno

- Location in Slovenia
- Coordinates: 46°3′49.17″N 15°5′50.37″E
- Country: Slovenia
- Traditional region: Lower Carniola
- Statistical region: Lower Sava
- Municipality: Radeče

Area
  - Total: 3.61 km^{2} (1.39 sq mi)
- Elevation: 538.6 m (1,767 ft)

Population (2002)
  - Total: 183

Svibno (pronounced [ˈsʋiːbnɔ]; German: Scharfenberg) is a settlement in the Municipality of Radeče in eastern Slovenia. The area is part of the historical region of Lower Carniola. The municipality is now included in the Lower Sava Statistical Region; until January 2014 it was part of the Savinja Statistical Region. It includes the hamlets of Malarija, Cumer, Pristava, Rasberg, and Podlog.

== Name ==
Svibo was attested in written sources as Scharffenberg in 1169, Scharphenberch c. 1175, and Sappffenberch in 1191, among other spellings. The name is derived from the Slovene common noun sviba 'dogwood', referring to the local vegetation.

== Church ==
The local parish church is dedicated to the Holy Cross and belongs to the Roman Catholic Archdiocese of Ljubljana. Its earliest phases date to the 13th century, but it was rebuilt and restyled over the centuries.
