= Dobovica =

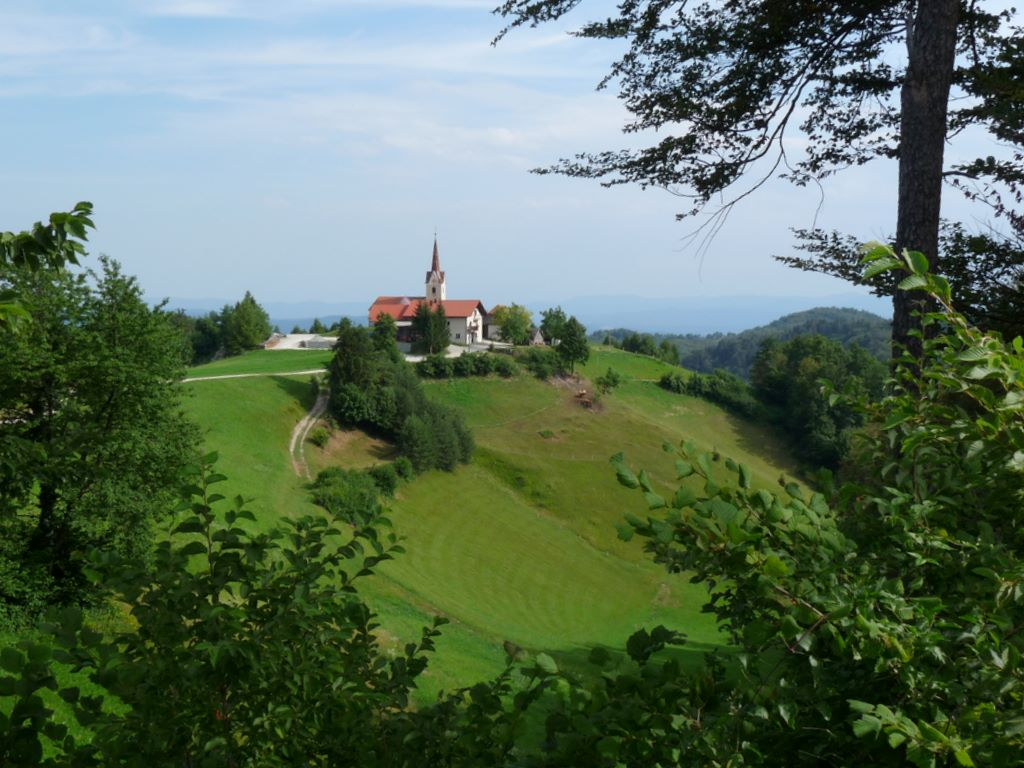

- Location in Slovenia
- Coordinates: 46°2′45.47″N 15°2′44.19″E
- Country: Slovenia
- Traditional region: Lower Carniola
- Statistical region: Central Sava
- Municipality: Litija

Area
  - Total: 2.53 km^{2} (0.98 sq mi)
- Elevation: 706.9 m (2,319 ft)

Population (2002)
  - Total: 43
- Postal code: 1273

Dobovica (pronounced [dɔbɔˈʋiːtsa]) is a settlement in the Municipality of Litija in central Slovenia. The area is part of the traditional region of Lower Carniola. It is now included with the rest of the municipality in the Central Sava Statistical Region.

The local church, built on a small hill south of the main settlement, is dedicated to Saint Catherine and belongs to the Parish of Dole pri Litiji. It is a Baroque building dating to the early 18th century when a nave, a belfry, and a new sanctuary were added to a 17th-century chapel that is now preserved as a side chapel.
