= Mežica =

- Town
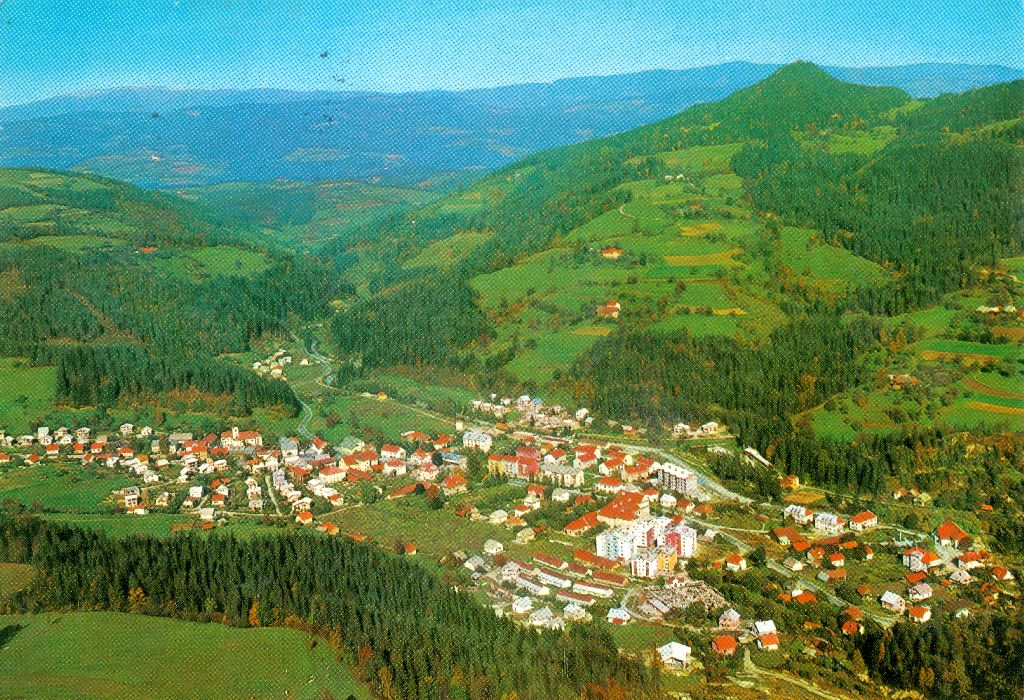
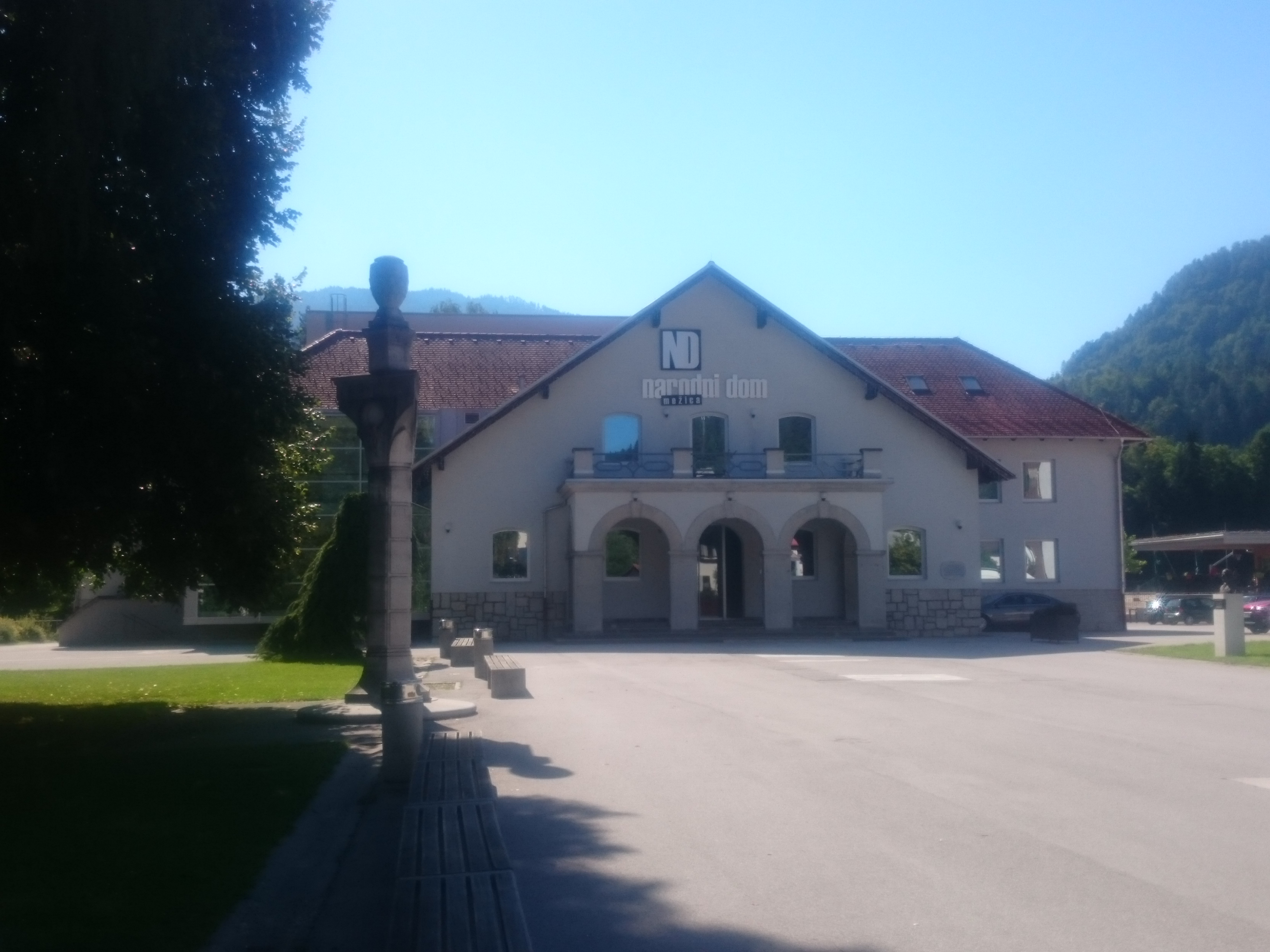
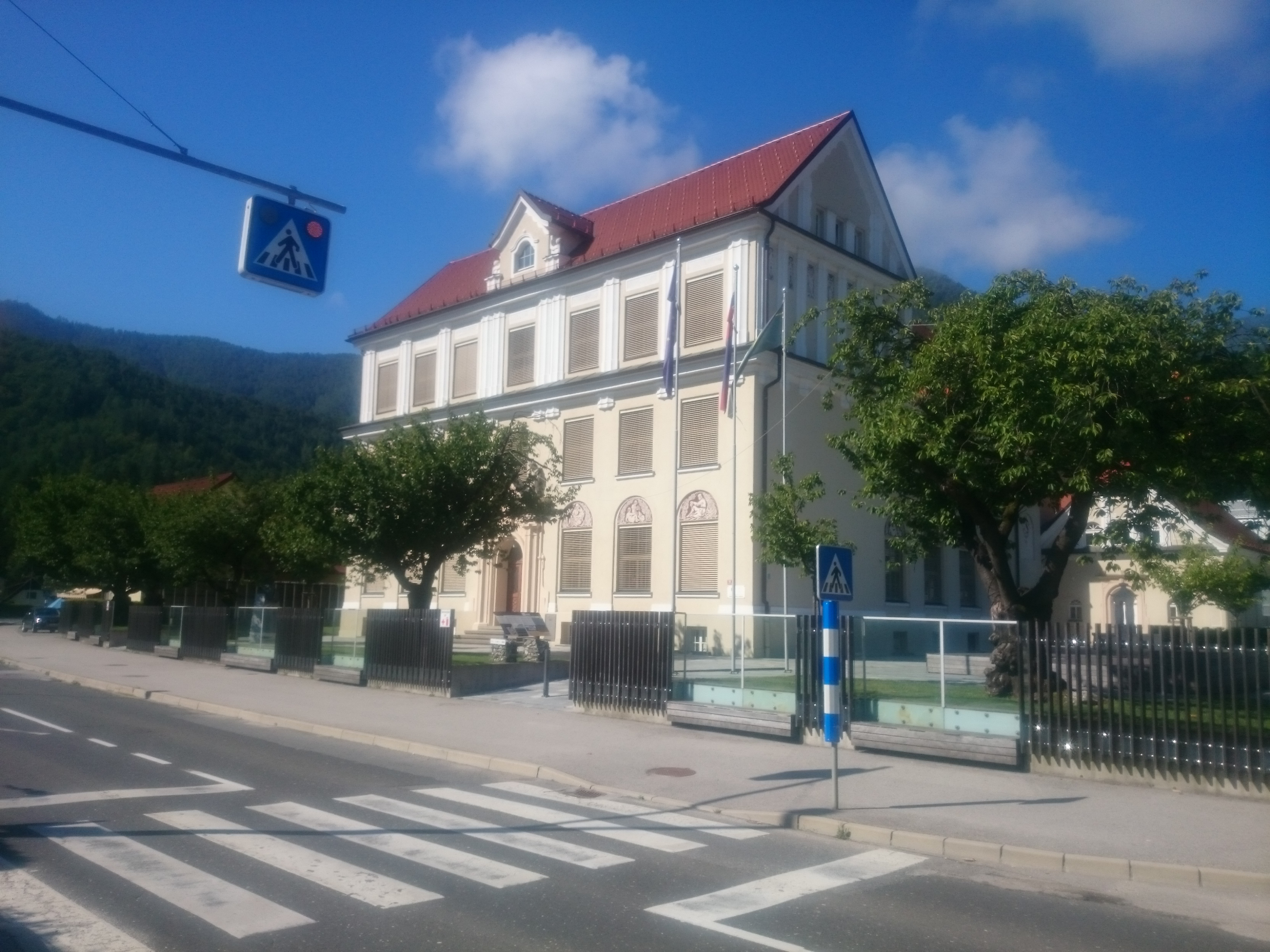
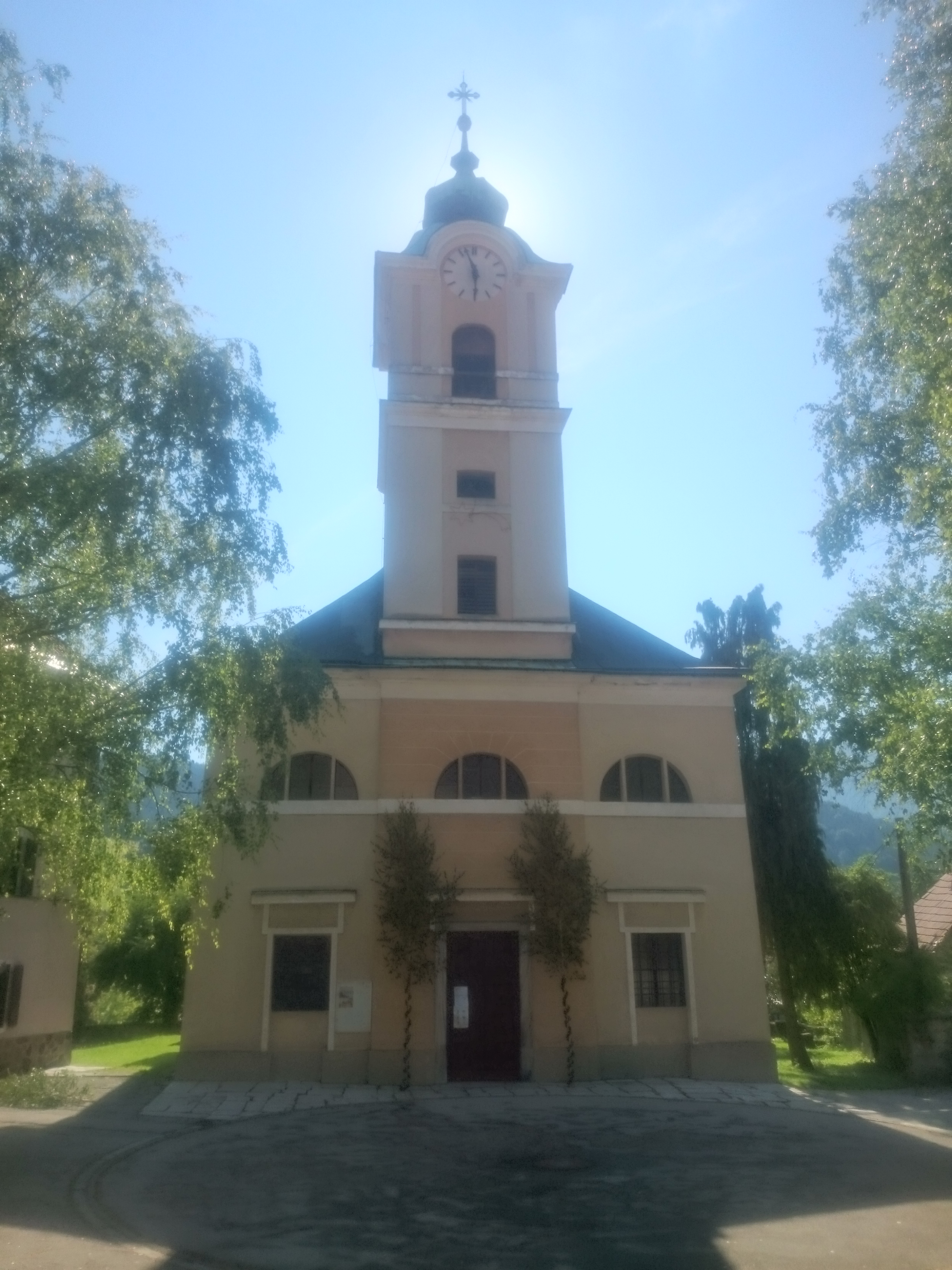
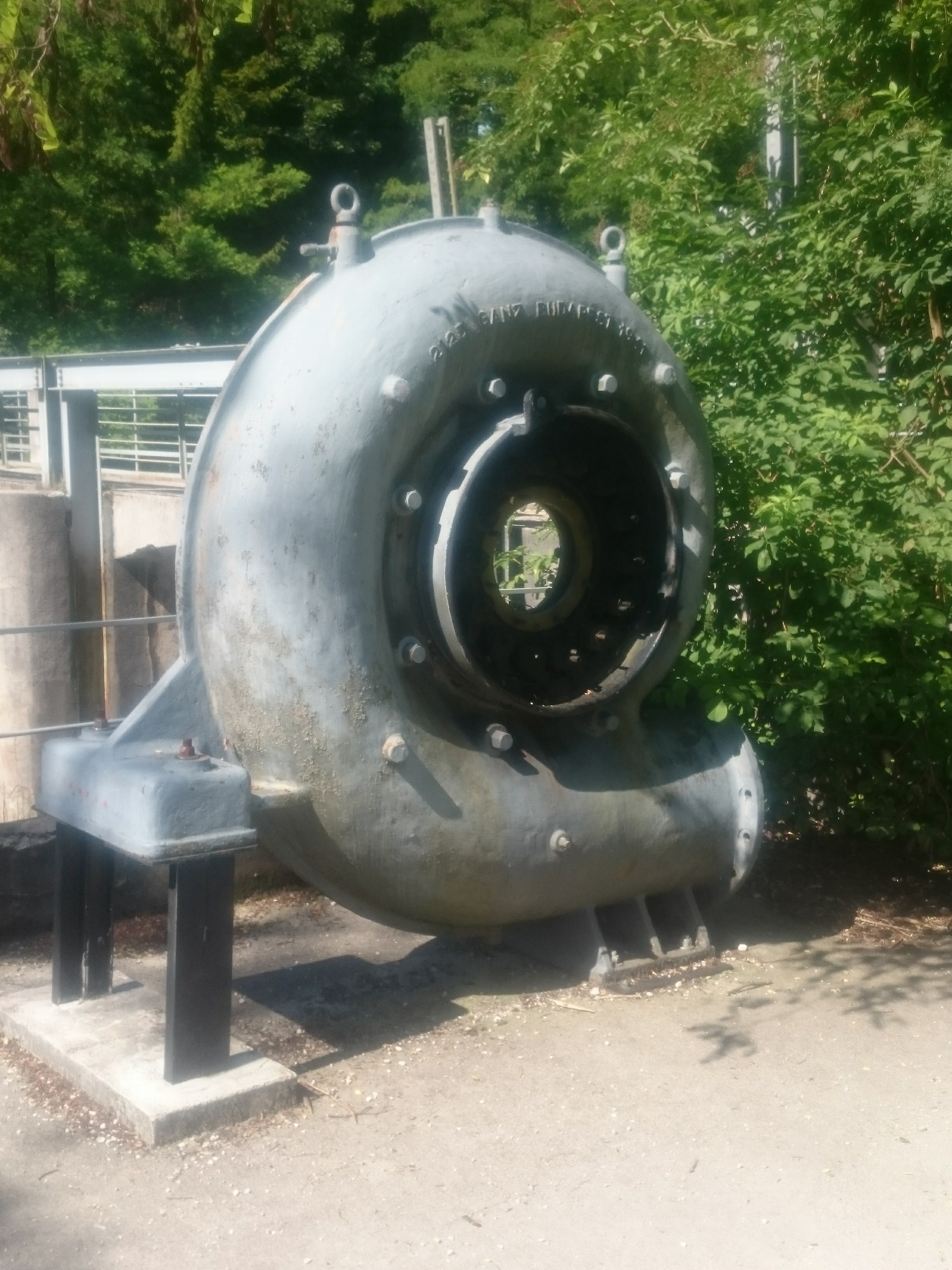
- From top, left to right: Old postcard of Mežica, National Hall, Primary School, St. James' Church, Francis turbine

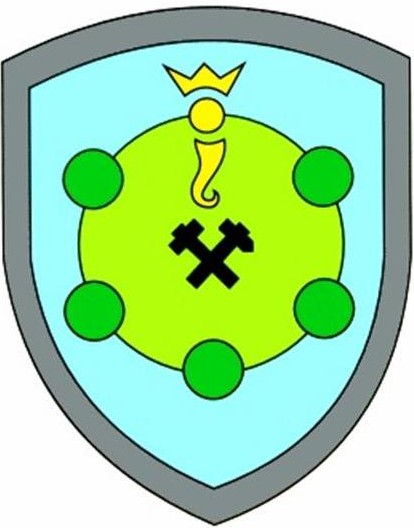
- Coat of arms

- Location in Slovenia
- Coordinates: 46°31′14″N 14°51′13″E
- Country: Slovenia
- Traditional region: Carinthia
- Statistical region: Carinthia
- Municipality: Mežica

Area
  - Total: 1.75 km^{2} (0.68 sq mi)
- Elevation: 480.7 m (1,577 ft)

Population (2019)
  - Total: 3,158

Mežica (pronounced [mɛˈʒìːtsa]; German: Mießdorf) is a town in northern Slovenia. It is the seat of the Municipality of Mežica. It lies on the Meža River in the traditional Slovenian province of Carinthia) near the Austrian border. The town developed close to a lead and zinc mine under Mount Peca. Mining began in 1665 and ended in 1994. Today the mine is only open for tourist visits.

The town once had a small ski area on Mount Peca, but this closed soon after the mining operations ceased to operate.

The parish church in the settlement is dedicated to Saint James. It is a single-nave building built in 1840 to replace an earlier smaller building.

Historical population
Year	Pop.	±%
1948	1,661	—
1953	2,078	+25.1%
1961	2,781	+33.8%
1971	3,495	+25.7%
1981	3,764	+7.7%
1991	3,840	+2.0%
2002	3,487	−9.2%
2011	3,254	−6.7%
2021	3,164	−2.8%
Population size may be affected by changes in administrative divisions.
