= Lower Sava Statistical Region =

Coordinates: 45°56′00″N 15°26′00″E

Lower Sava Statistical Region posavska statistična regija
- Statistical region
- Municipalities: 6
- Largest town: Brežice

Area
  - Total: 885 km^{2} (342 sq mi)

Population (2020)
  - Total: 70,349
  - Density: 79.5/km^{2} (206/sq mi)

Statistics
  - Households: 30147
  - Employed: 23414
  - Registered unemployed: 4695
  - College/university students: 3019
  - Regional GDP (2019): EUR 1,475 bn (EUR 19,456 per capita)
- HDI (2022): 0.889 very high · 9th

The Lower Sava Statistical Region (Slovene: posavska statistična regija; until December 31, 2014 spodnjeposavska statistična regija) is a statistical region in Slovenia. It has good traffic accessibility and is located in the Sava and Krka Valleys, with hilly areas with vineyards and an abundance of water. It is the second-smallest statistical region in Slovenia. The only nuclear power plant in the country and Čatež spa are located in the region. The region annually spends EUR 22 million on environmental protection. In 2013, the employment rate in the region was 57.5%. The region was characterized by the largest difference between the employment rate for men and for women (for men it was 12 percentage points higher than for women). In 2013 this region also stood out in number of convicted persons per 1,000 population (8.3).

== Cities and towns ==
The Lower Sava Statistical Region includes 5 cities and towns, the largest of which are Krško and Brežice.

Rank	Name	Population (2021)
1.	Brežice	6,888
2.	Krško	6,778
3.	Sevnica	4,521
4.	Radeče	1,949
5.	Kostanjevica na Krki	702

== Municipalities ==
The Lower Sava Statistical Region comprises six municipalities:

- Bistrica ob Sotli
- Brežice
- Kostanjevica na Krki
- Krško
- Radeče
- Sevnica

== Demographics ==
The population in 2020 was 70,349. It has a total area of 885 square kilometers (342 sq mi).

== Economy ==
Employment structure: 45.8% services, 50% industry, 4.2% agriculture.

=== Tourism ===
It attracts 5.1% of the total number of tourists in Slovenia, most being from Slovenia (53%).

== Transportation ==
- Length of motorways: 36.6 kilometers (22.7 mi)
- Length of other roads: 2,346.3 kilometers (1,457.9 mi)

== Sources ==
- Slovenian regions in figures 2014
