= Dobrá Voda =

Dobrá Voda or Dobra Voda may refer to places:

== Bosnia and Herzegovina ==
- Dobra Voda (Modriča), a village in Modriča municipality

== Croatia ==
- Dobra Voda, Zadar County, a village in Benkovac municipality
- Dobra Voda, Požega-Slavonia County, a village in Čaglin municipality

== Czech Republic ==
- Dobrá Voda (Pelhřimov District), a municipality and village in the Vysočina Region
- Dobrá Voda (Žďár nad Sázavou District), a municipality and village in the Vysočina Region
- Dobrá Voda, a village and part of Březnice (Příbram District) in the Central Bohemian Region
- Dobrá Voda, a village and part of Číměř (Jindřichův Hradec District) in the South Bohemian Region
- Dobrá Voda, a village and part of Hartmanice (Klatovy District) in the Plzeň Region
- Dobrá Voda, a village and part of Horní Stropnice in the South Bohemian Region
- Dobrá Voda, a village and part of Jedlá in the Vysočina Region
- Dobrá Voda, a village and part of Klatovy in the Plzeň Region
- Dobrá Voda, a hamlet and part of Kovářov in the South Bohemian Region
- Dobrá Voda, a hamlet and part of Malčín in the Vysočina Region
- Dobrá Voda, a village and part of Mladoňovice (Třebíč District) in the Vysočina Region
- Dobrá Voda, a village and part of Mrákotín (Jihlava District) in the Vysočina Region
- Dobrá Voda, a village and part of Mnichovo Hradiště in the Central Bohemian Region
- Dobrá Voda, a village and part of Orlické Podhůří in the Pardubice Region
- Dobrá Voda, a village and part of Toužim in the Karlovy Vary Region
- Dobrá Voda Lipnická, a village and part of Dolní Město in the Vysočina Region
- Dobrá Voda u Českých Budějovic, a municipality and village in the South Bohemian Region
- Dobrá Voda u Hořic, a municipality and village in the Hradec Králové Region
- Dobrá Voda u Pacova, a municipality and village in the Vysočina Region

== Kosovo ==
- Dobra Voda, a village in Klina municipality

== Montenegro ==
- Dobra Voda (Bar)

== North Macedonia ==
- Dobra Voda (peak), a mountain peak

== Slovakia ==
- Dobrá Voda, Trnava District, a municipality and village in the Trnava Region
  - Dobrá Voda castle, a castle in Dobrá Voda
