= Voda =

Voda (Cyrillic: Вода, Polish: Woda, Belarusian: Вада Vada) is water in several Slavic languages. It may refer to:

- "Voda" (song), a song by Ana Soklič representing Slovenia in Eurovision Song Contest 2020
- Voda, Kansas, United States
- Krista Voda (born 1974), American sportscaster

== See also ==
- Bhoda is a village located in the Ludhiana East tehsil, of Ludhiana district, Punjab.
- Bhoda is a village in Phillaur in Jalandhar district of Punjab State, India.
- Bhoda Hoshnak is a village in Fatehabad district of Haryana, India.
- Bela Voda (disambiguation)
- Červená Voda (disambiguation)
- Dobrá Voda (disambiguation)
- Stará Voda (disambiguation)
- Vodice (disambiguation)
- Wasser (disambiguation)
