= Vodice =

Vodice may refer to:

== Croatia ==
- Vodice, Croatia, a town and municipality in Šibenik-Knin County
- Vodice, Cres, a village on Cres
- Vodice, Istria County, a village near Lanišće

== Czech Republic ==
- Vodice (Tábor District), a municipality and village in the South Bohemian Region
- Vodice, a village and part of Lhenice in the South Bohemian Region

== Slovenia ==
- Vodice, Ajdovščina, a settlement in the Municipality of Ajdovščina
- Vodice, Dobrepolje, a settlement in the Municipality of Dobrepolje
- Vodice nad Kamnikom, a settlement in the Municipality of Kamnik
- Vodice pri Gabrovki, a settlement in the Municipality of Litija
- Vodice pri Kalobju, a settlement in the Municipality of Šentjur
- Vodice pri Slivnici, a settlement in the Municipality of Šentjur
- Vodice, Vodice, a settlement in the Municipality of Vodice
- Vodice, Zagorje ob Savi, a former settlement in the Municipality of Zagorje ob Savi, now part of Jablana
- Municipality of Vodice, a municipality in north-central Slovenia

== Albania ==
- Vodicë, a village in the municipality of Kolonjë
- Vodicë, a village in the municipality of Vlorë
- Vodicë, a village in the municipality of Poliçan
