= Mladoňovice =

Mladoňovice may refer to places in the Czech Republic:

- Mladoňovice (Chrudim District), a municipality and village in the Pardubice Region
- Mladoňovice (Třebíč District), a municipality village in the Vysočina Region
