= Bela Voda =

Bela Voda may refer to the following villages in Serbia:

- Bela Voda (Kruševac)
- Bela Voda (Prokuplje)
