= Srubec =

- Municipality
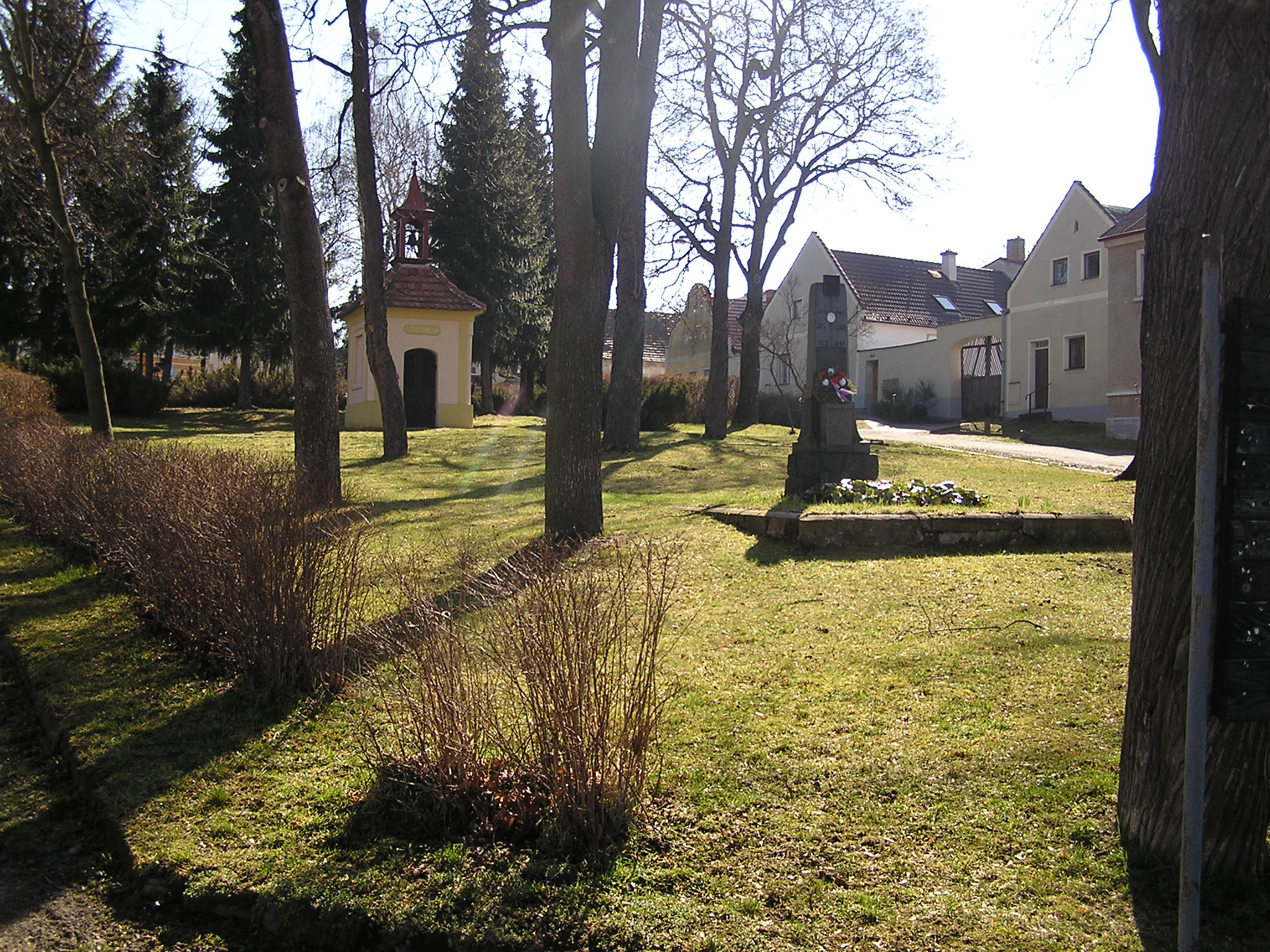
- Stará Pohůrka, a part of Srubec

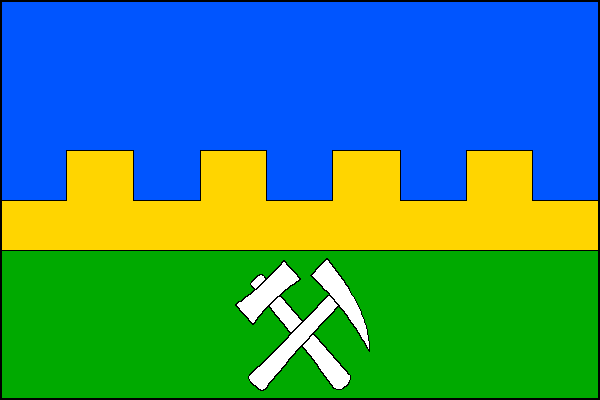
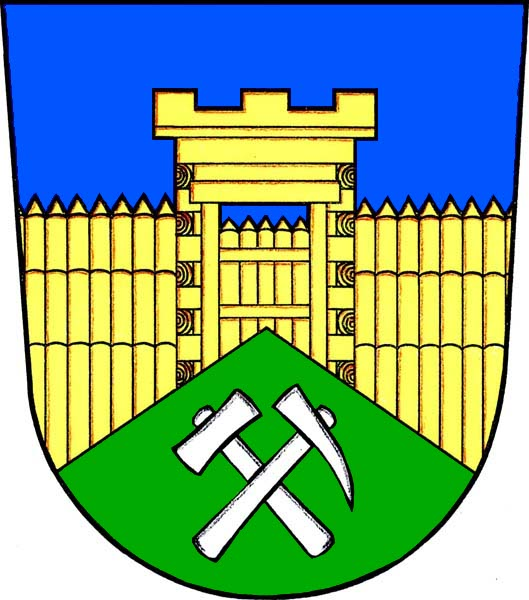
- Flag Coat of arms

- Location in the Czech Republic
- Coordinates: 48°56′53″N 14°32′29″E
- Country: Czech Republic
- Region: South Bohemian
- District: České Budějovice
- First mentioned: 1439

Area
  - Total: 6.00 km^{2} (2.32 sq mi)
- Elevation: 515 m (1,690 ft)

Population (2026-01-01)
  - Total: 2,971
  - Density: 495/km^{2} (1,280/sq mi)
- Time zone: UTC+1 (CET)
  - Summer (DST): UTC+2 (CEST)
- Postal code: 370 06
- Website: www.srubec.cz

Srubec is a municipality and village in České Budějovice District in the South Bohemian Region of the Czech Republic. It has about 3,000 inhabitants.

== Administrative division ==
Srubec consists of two municipal parts (in brackets population according to the 2021 census):

- Srubec (2,600)
- Stará Pohůrka (326)

== Etymology ==
The name arose as a diminutive of the Czech word srub, i.e. 'log cabin'.

== Geography ==
Srubec is located about 5 kilometres (3 mi) southeast of České Budějovice. It lies mostly in the Třeboň Basin, on the western tip of the municipal territory extends into the České Budějovice Basin. The highest point is at 545 m (1,788 ft) above sea level. The villages of Srubec and Stará Pohůrka are urbanistically fused. They are also fused with neighbouring Dobrá Voda u Českých Budějovic.

== History ==
The first written mention of Srubec is from 1439. Until 1602, the owners of the village often changed. From 1602 until the establishment of an independent municipality in 1850, Srubec was a property of the city of České Budějovice. It was an agricultural village, only in the first half of the 19th century it was a silver mining site.

== Demographics ==
Historical population

| Year | Pop. | ±% |
|---|---|---|
| 1869 | 545 | — |
| 1880 | 673 | +23.5% |
| 1890 | 769 | +14.3% |
| 1900 | 740 | −3.8% |
| 1910 | 843 | +13.9% |

| Year | Pop. | ±% |
|---|---|---|
| 1921 | 874 | +3.7% |
| 1930 | 971 | +11.1% |
| 1950 | 827 | −14.8% |
| 1961 | 676 | −18.3% |
| 1970 | 689 | +1.9% |

| Year | Pop. | ±% |
|---|---|---|
| 1980 | 716 | +3.9% |
| 1991 | 695 | −2.9% |
| 2001 | 917 | +31.9% |
| 2011 | 2,015 | +119.7% |
| 2021 | 2,926 | +45.2% |

Source: Censuses

== Transport ==
There are no railways or major roads passing through the municipality.

== Sights ==
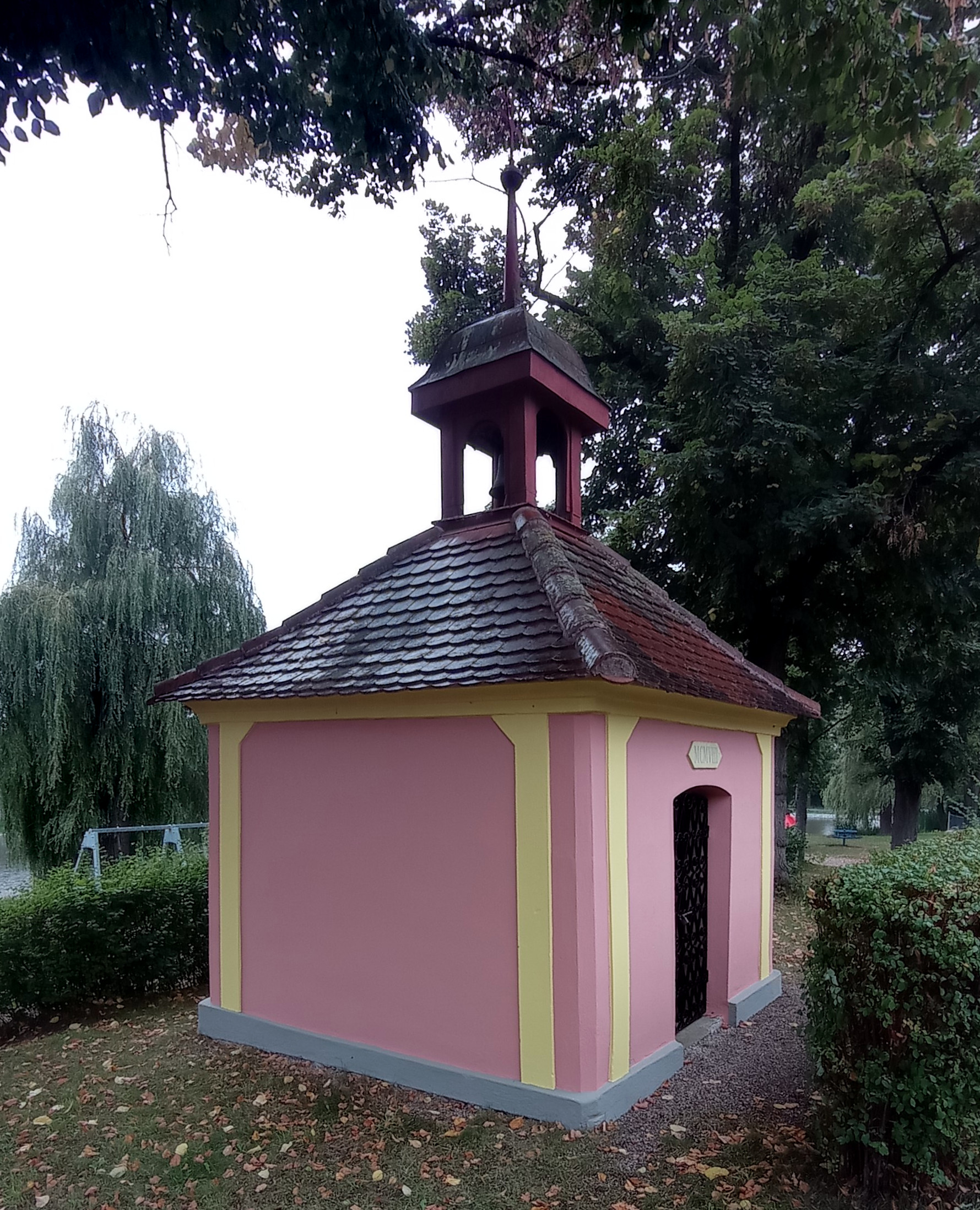
Chapel of the Virgin Mary

There are no protected cultural monuments in the municipality. Among the landmarks are the two chapels, one in the centre of Srubec and one in the centre of Stará Pohůrka. The Chapel of the Virgin Mary in Srubec dates from 1908.
