= Jablana, Zagorje ob Savi =

Jablana
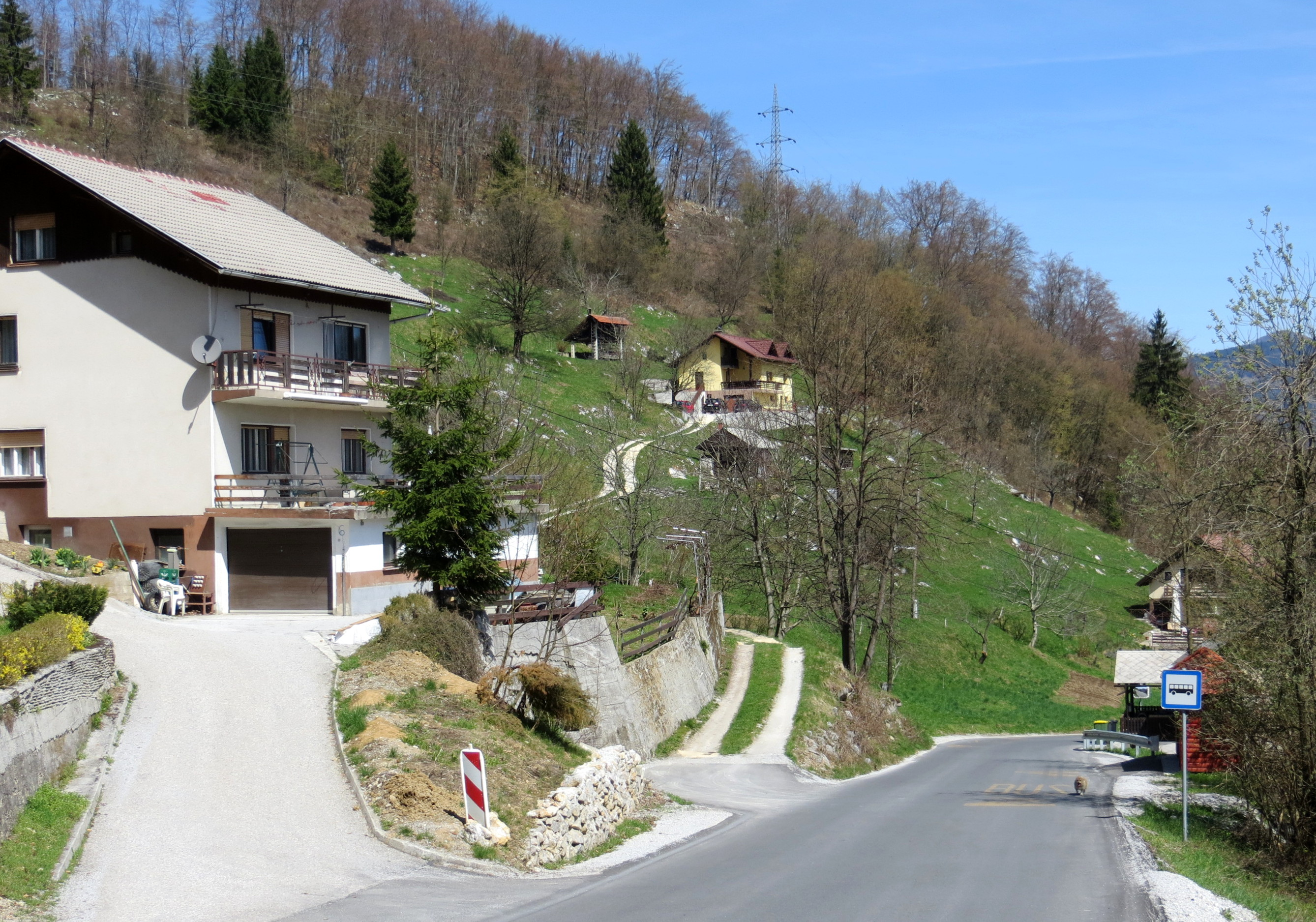

- Location in Slovenia
- Coordinates: 46°7′16.91″N 14°57′1.12″E
- Country: Slovenia
- Traditional region: Upper Carniola
- Statistical region: Central Sava
- Municipality: Zagorje ob Savi

Area
  - Total: 2.48 km^{2} (0.96 sq mi)
- Elevation: 770.7 m (2,529 ft)

Population (2002)
  - Total: 90
- Postal code: 1410

Jablana (pronounced [ˈjaːblana]) is a settlement in the hills west of Zagorje ob Savi in central Slovenia. The area is part of the traditional region of Upper Carniola. It is now included with the rest of the Municipality of Zagorje ob Savi in the Central Sava Statistical Region.

== Geography ==
Jablana is a clustered village on a slope on the east side of Jablana Peak (Slovene: Jablanški vrh; 902 meters or 2,959 feet). It includes the hamlets of Vodice to the northeast and Mala Peč to the east. Kal was formerly a hamlet of Jablana, but it became a separate village in 2000. The soil is sandy.

== Church ==
The local church is dedicated to the Holy Cross and belongs to the Parish of Šentlambert. It dates to the second half of the 16th century.
