= Brezje nad Kamnikom =

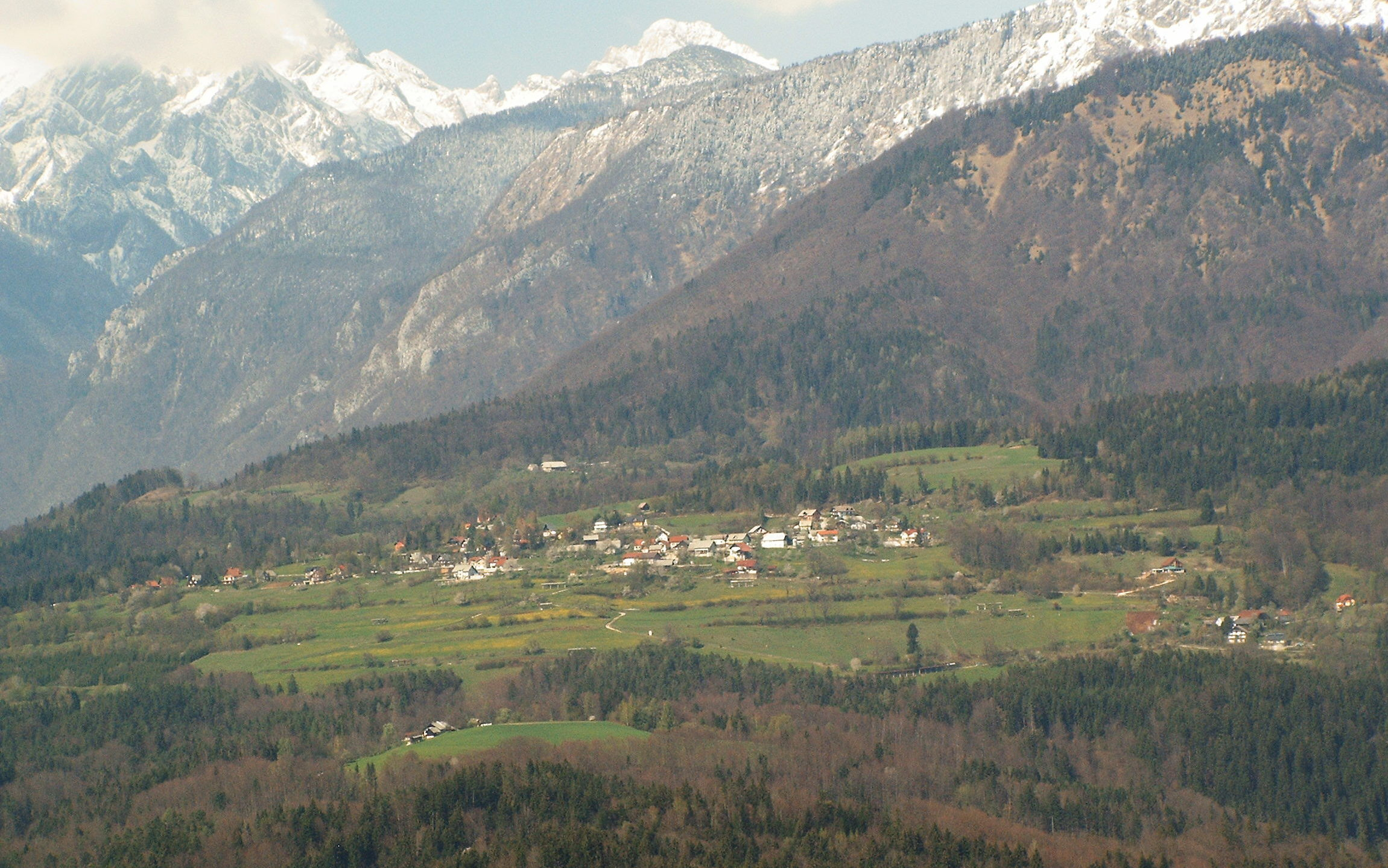
- Brezje nad Kamnikom

- Location in Slovenia
- Coordinates: 46°15′34.22″N 14°37′19.76″E
- Country: Slovenia
- Traditional region: Upper Carniola
- Statistical region: Central Slovenia
- Municipality: Kamnik
- Elevation: 624.7 m (2,050 ft)

Population (2002)
  - Total: 76

Brezje nad Kamnikom (pronounced [ˈbɾeːzjɛ nat ˈkaːmnikɔm]) is a settlement in the Municipality of Kamnik in the Upper Carniola region of Slovenia.

== Geography ==
Brezje nad Kamnikom lies on the northwest slope of Vovar Hill (940 meters or 3,080 feet) on a level sun-exposed ridge. The soil is shallow and loamy. There is a natural cave under the village, with the entrance along the road to Vodice nad Kamnikom.

== Name ==
Brezje nad Kamnikom was attested in written sources as Bresyach in 1368 and Nabresy in 1499, among other spellings. The name of the settlement was changed from Brezje to Brezje nad Kamnikom (literally, 'Brezje above Kamnik') in 1953.

== Cultural heritage ==
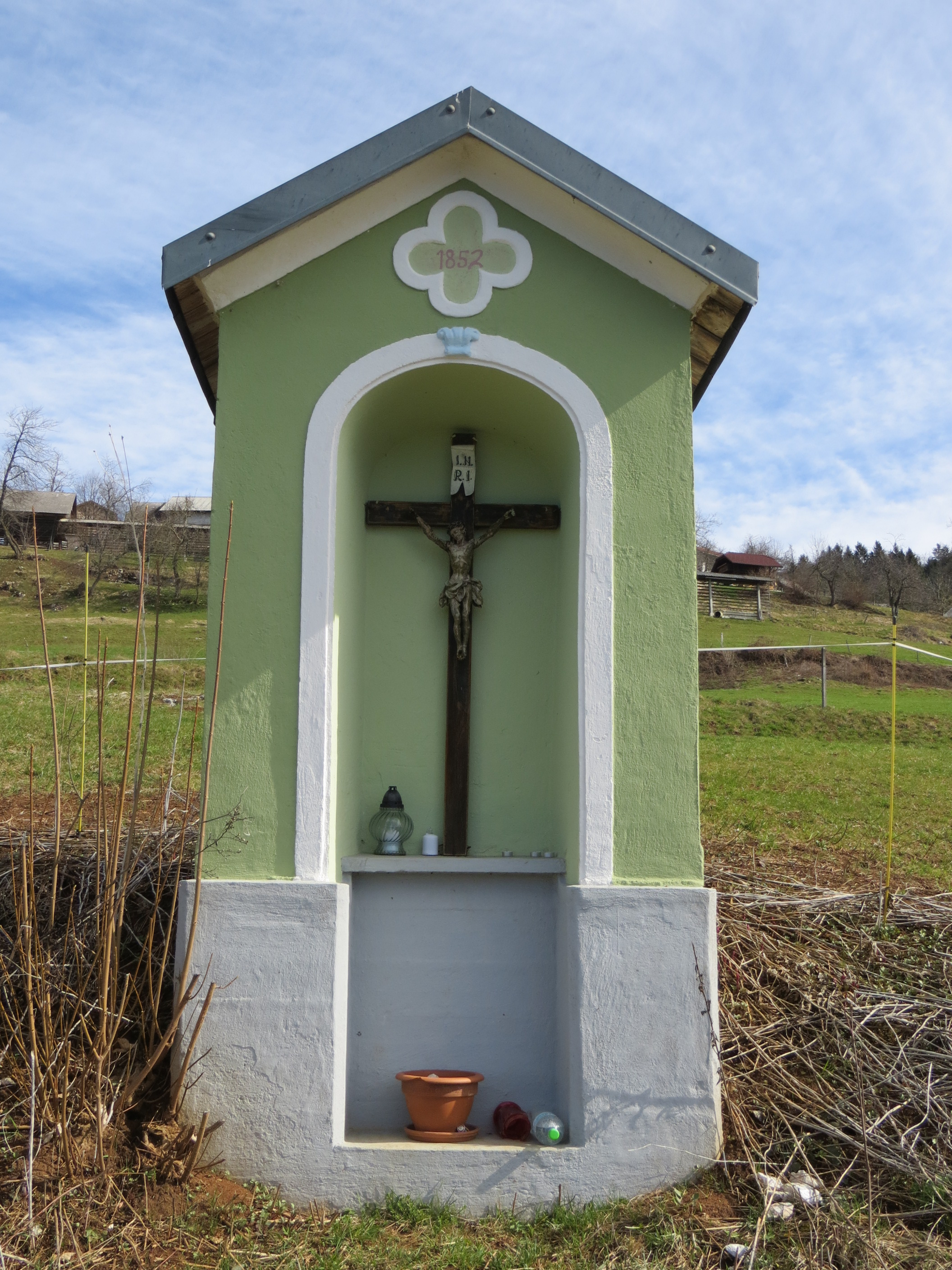
Wayside shrine

A chapel shrine in Brezje nad Kamnikom has been registered as cultural heritage. The shrine stands along the old road from Godič to Brezje nad Kamnikom. It is a closed chapel-shrine (kapelica zaprtega tipa) with a quatrefoil ornament on the gable. The semicircular niche contains a wooden crucifix. The shrine dates from 1852.
