= Kal, Zagorje ob Savi =

Kal
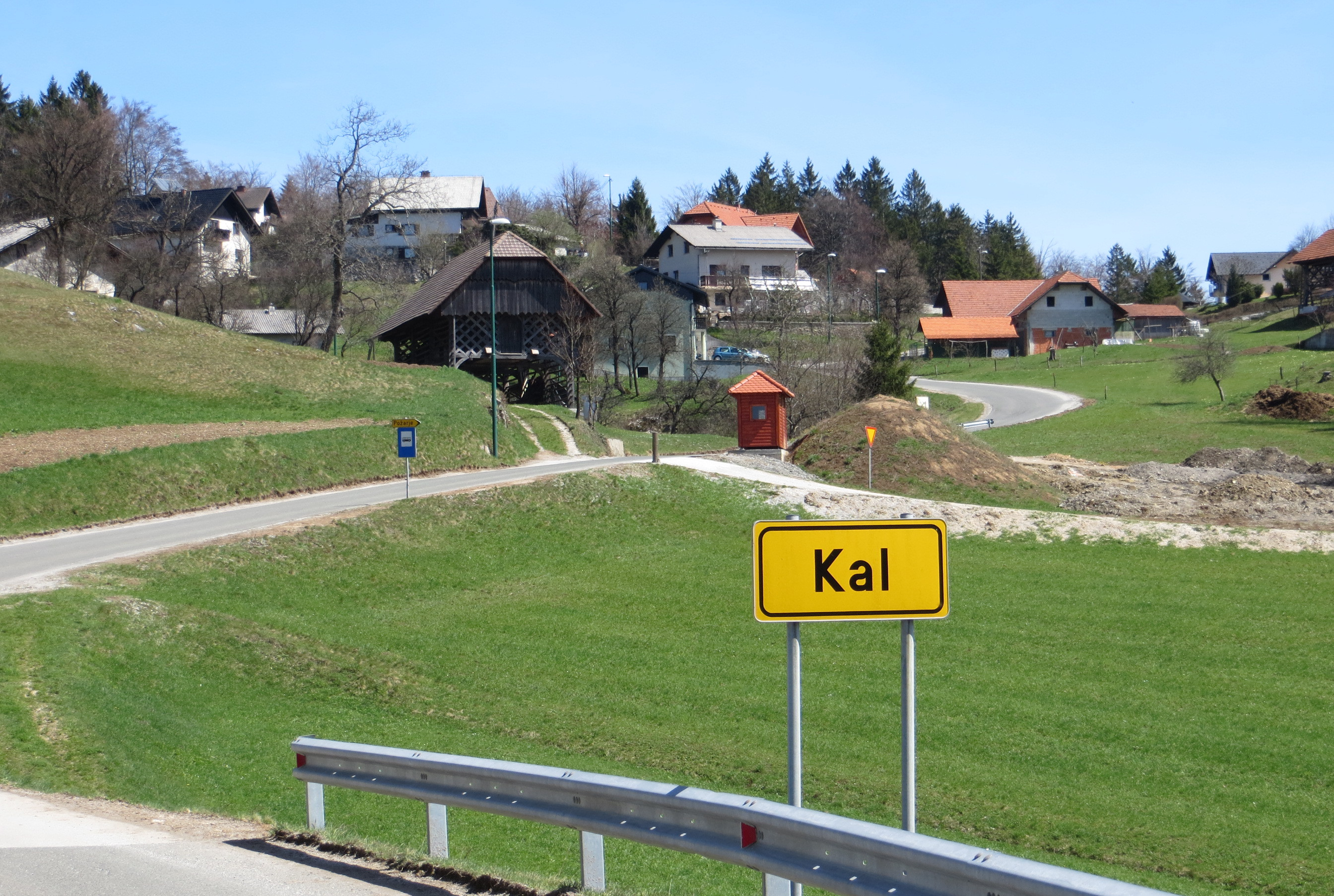

- Location in Slovenia
- Coordinates: 46°6′55.07″N 14°57′9.73″E
- Country: Slovenia
- Traditional region: Styria
- Statistical region: Central Sava
- Municipality: Zagorje ob Savi

Area
  - Total: 0.7 km^{2} (0.27 sq mi)
- Elevation: 680 m (2,230 ft)

Population (2015)
  - Total: 100
- Postal code: 1410 Zagorje ob Savi

Kal (pronounced [ˈkaːl]) is a settlement in the hills west of Zagorje ob Savi in central Slovenia. The area is part of the traditional region of Styria. It is now included with the rest of the Municipality of Zagorje ob Savi in the Central Sava Statistical Region.

== History ==
Kal was a separate village until 1953, when, together with Vodice, it was annexed by Jablana. Kal became an independent settlement again in 2000, when it was separated from Jablana. Further territorial adjustment was made in 2001, when Kal annexed part of the territory of Požarje.
