= Vodice pri Gabrovki =

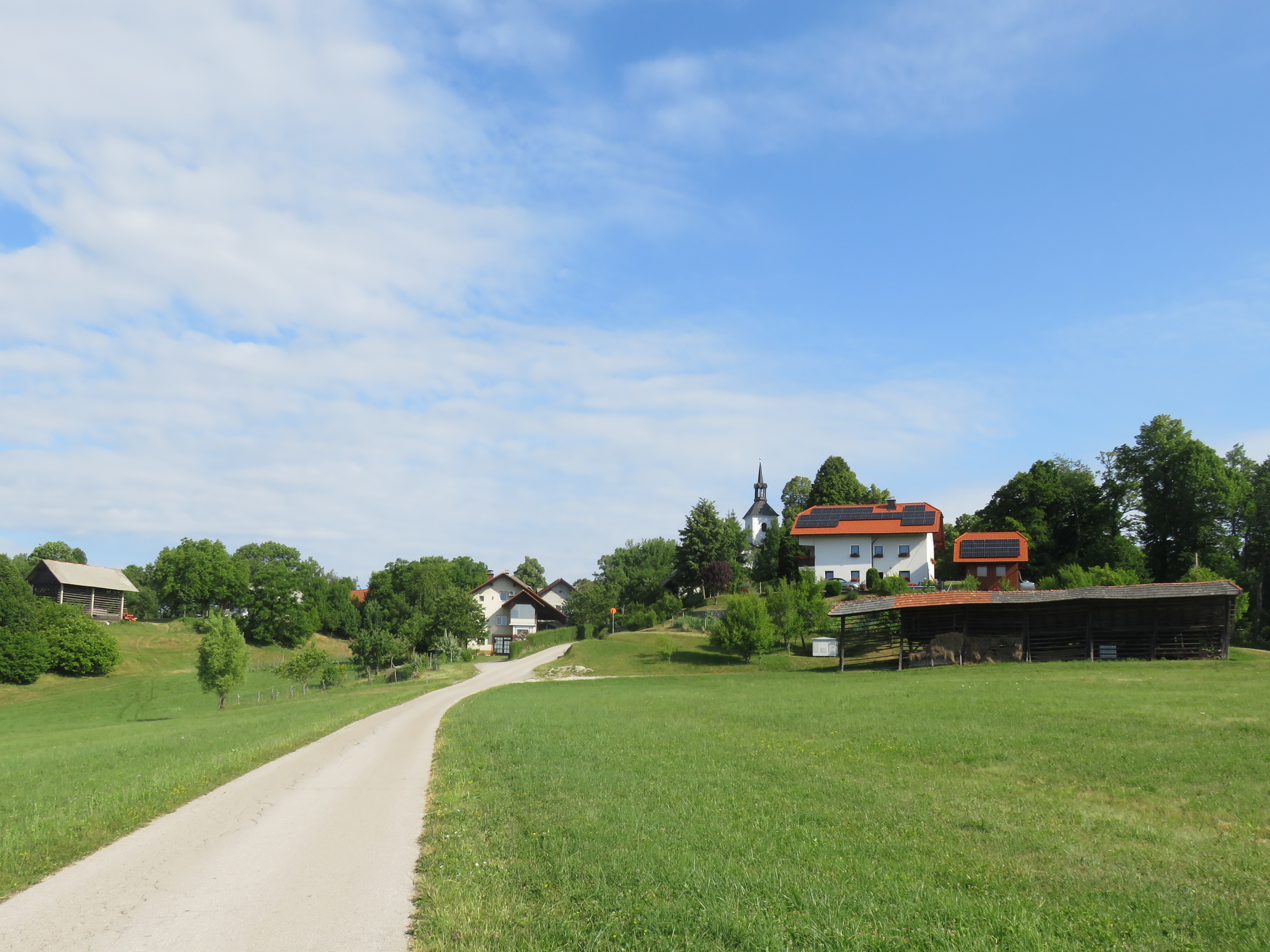

- Location in Slovenia
- Coordinates: 46°0′57.96″N 14°58′34.44″E
- Country: Slovenia
- Traditional region: Lower Carniola
- Statistical region: Central Sava
- Municipality: Litija

Area
  - Total: 2.16 km^{2} (0.83 sq mi)
- Elevation: 693.5 m (2,275 ft)

Population (2002)
  - Total: 41
- Postal code: 1274

Vodice pri Gabrovki (pronounced [ʋɔˈdiːtsɛ pɾi ˈɡaːbɾɔu̯ki]; German: Woditz) is a settlement north of Gabrovka in the Municipality of Litija in central Slovenia. The area is part of the traditional region of Lower Carniola and is now included with the rest of the municipality in the Central Sava Statistical Region. The settlement includes the hamlets of Zgornje Vodice, Spodnje Vodice (German: Unterwoditz), and Greben.

== Name ==
The name of the settlement was changed from Vodice to Vodice pri Gabrovki in 1953. In the past the German name was Woditz.

== Church ==
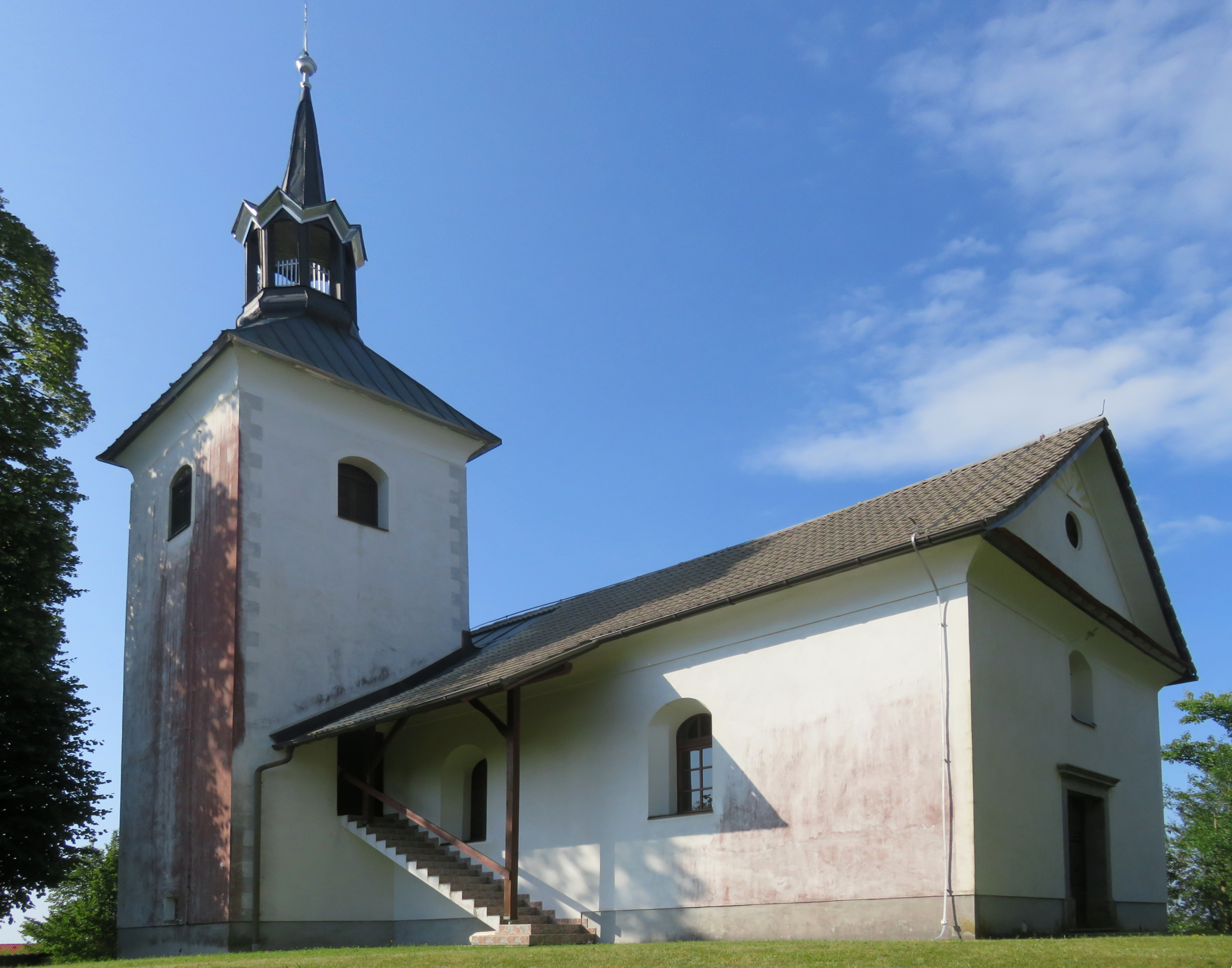
Saint Agnes's Church

The local church is dedicated to Saint Agnes (Slovene: sveta Neža) and belongs to the Parish of Gabrovka. It dates to the late 15th century.
