= Malčín =

- Municipality
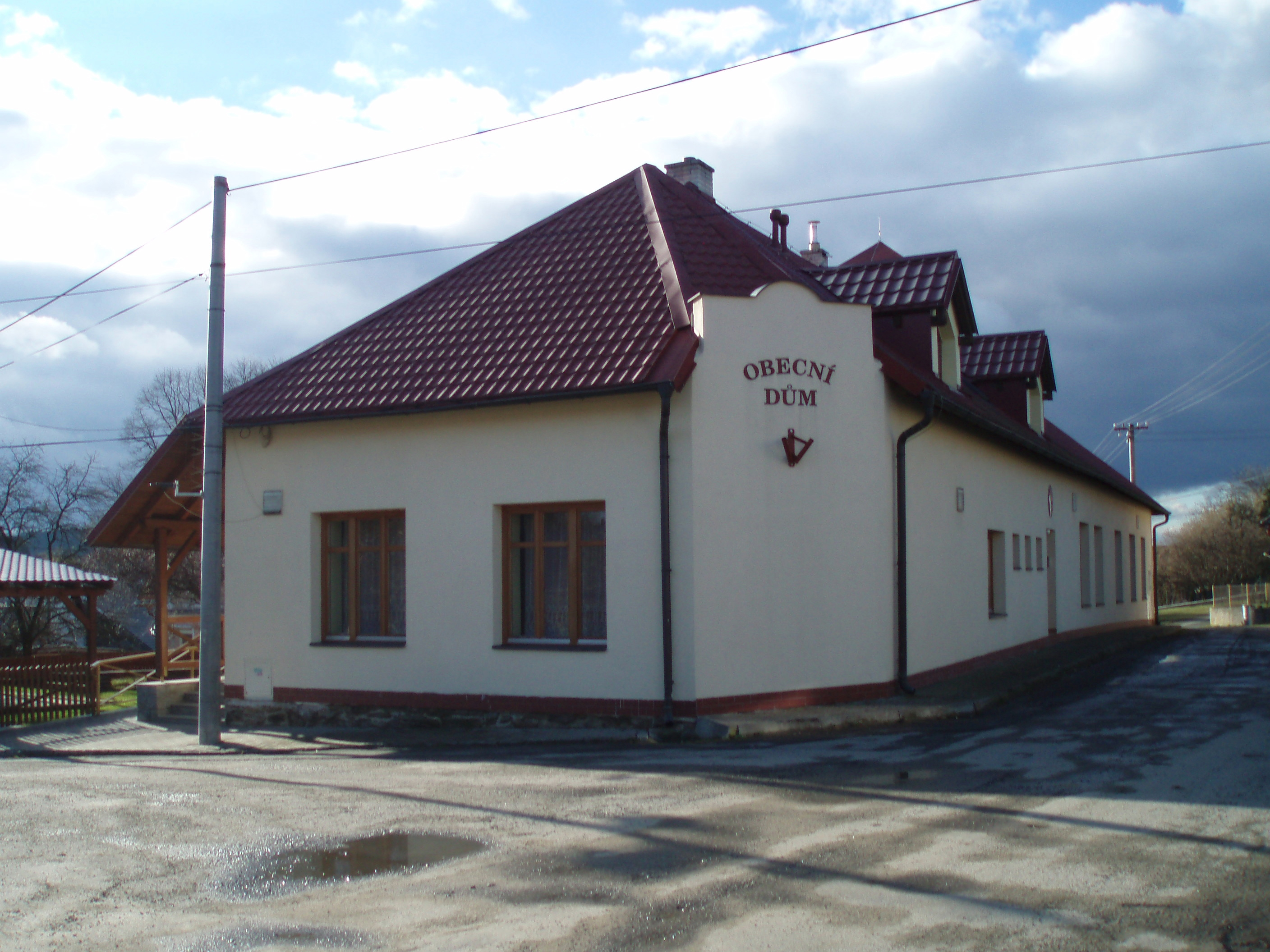
- Municipal office

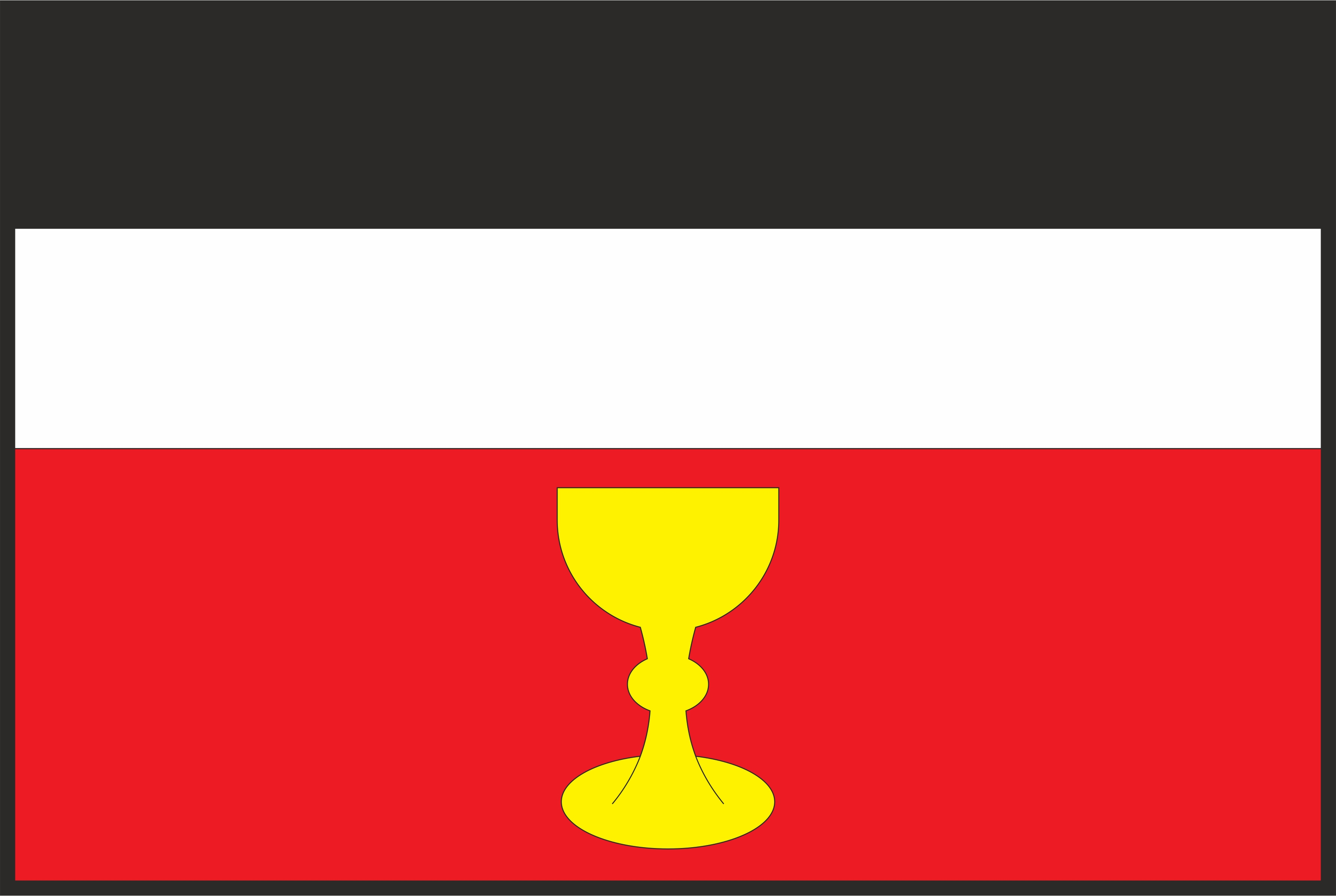
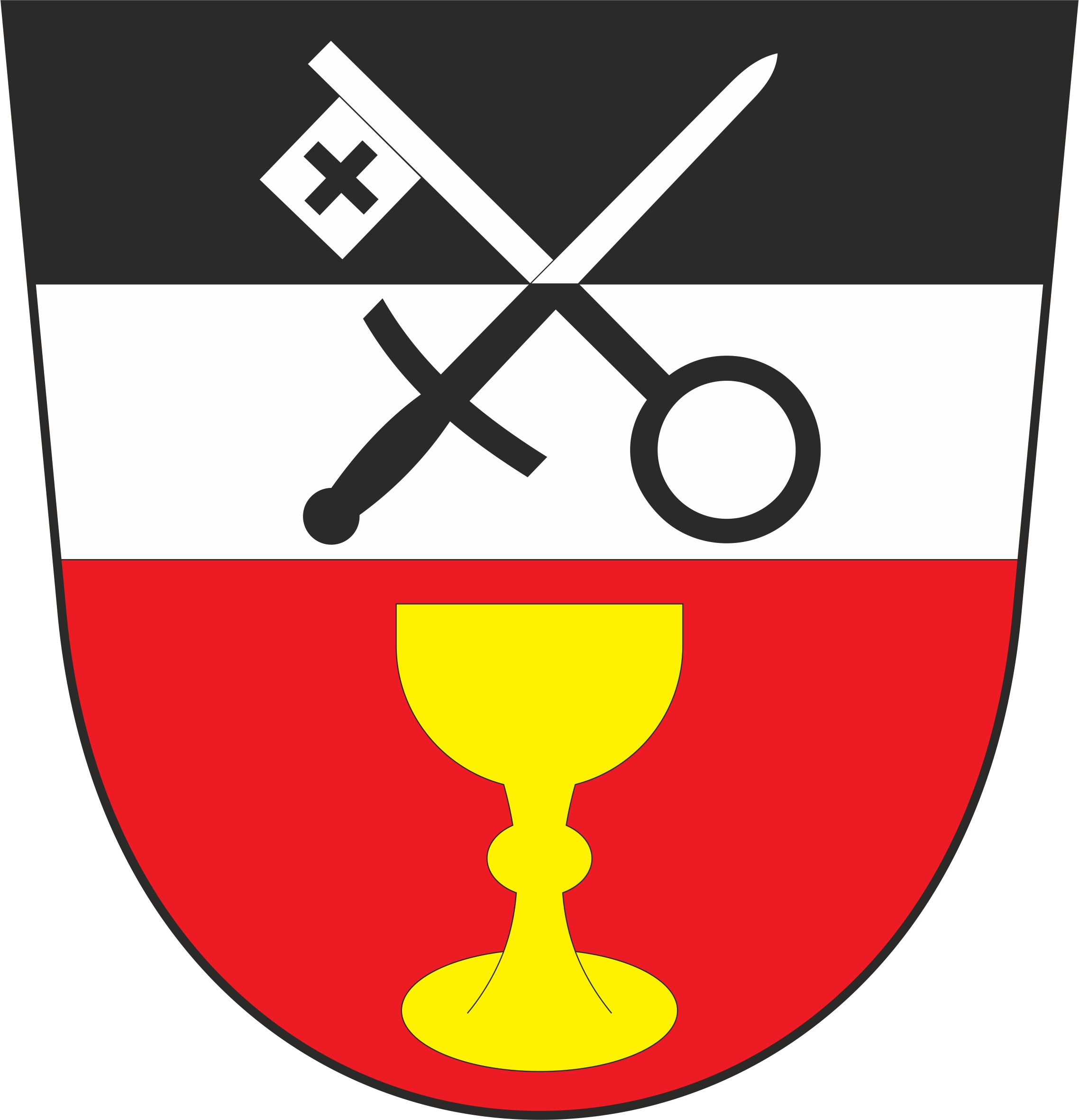
- Flag Coat of arms

- Location in the Czech Republic
- Coordinates: 49°41′19″N 15°27′55″E
- Country: Czech Republic
- Region: Vysočina
- District: Havlíčkův Brod
- First mentioned: 1358

Area
  - Total: 12.74 km^{2} (4.92 sq mi)
- Elevation: 512 m (1,680 ft)

Population (2026-01-01)
  - Total: 211
  - Density: 16.6/km^{2} (42.9/sq mi)
- Time zone: UTC+1 (CET)
  - Summer (DST): UTC+2 (CEST)
- Postal code: 582 91
- Website: www.malcin.cz

Malčín is a municipality and village in Havlíčkův Brod District in the Vysočina Region of the Czech Republic. It has about 200 inhabitants.

Malčín lies approximately 12 kilometres (7 mi) north-west of Havlíčkův Brod, 34 km (21 mi) north of Jihlava, and 89 km (55 mi) south-east of Prague.

== Administrative division ==
Malčín consists of two municipal parts (in brackets population according to the 2021 census):

- Malčín (198)
- Dobrá Voda (3)

== Demographics ==
Historical population
Year	Pop.	±%
1869	432	—
1880	351	−18.8%
1890	430	+22.5%
1900	402	−6.5%
1910	414	+3.0%
1921	379	−8.5%
1930	355	−6.3%
1950	284	−20.0%
1961	288	+1.4%
1970	251	−12.8%
1980	235	−6.4%
1991	225	−4.3%
2001	207	−8.0%
2011	199	−3.9%
2021	201	+1.0%
Source: Censuses
