= Dobrá Voda u Hořic =

- Municipality
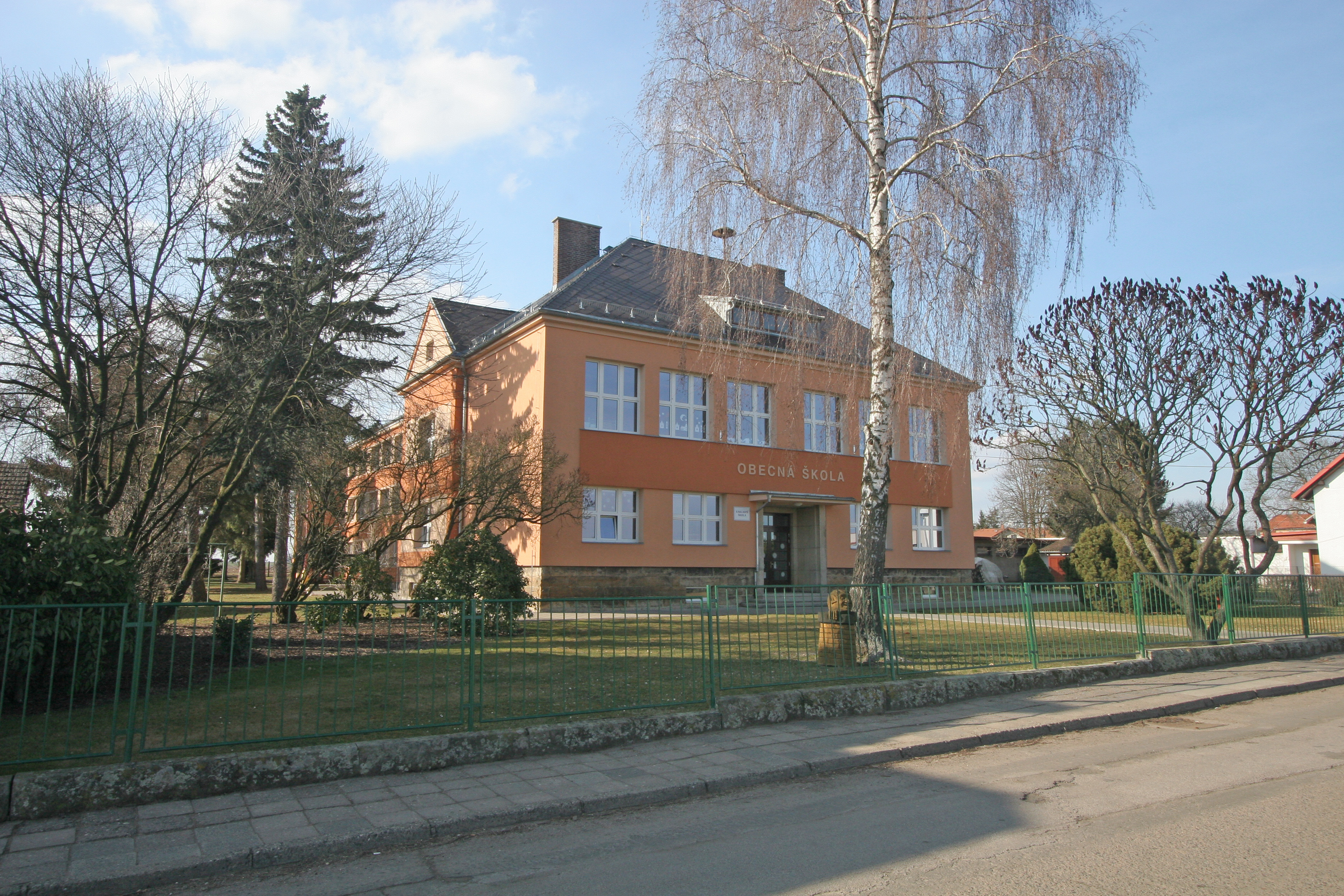
- Primary school

- Flag Coat of arms

- Location in the Czech Republic
- Coordinates: 50°20′53″N 15°36′10″E
- Country: Czech Republic
- Region: Hradec Králové
- District: Jičín
- First mentioned: 1395

Area
  - Total: 5.82 km^{2} (2.25 sq mi)
- Elevation: 274 m (899 ft)

Population (2026-01-01)
  - Total: 603
  - Density: 104/km^{2} (268/sq mi)
- Time zone: UTC+1 (CET)
  - Summer (DST): UTC+2 (CEST)
- Postal code: 507 73
- Website: dobravodauhoric.cz

Dobrá Voda u Hořic is a municipality and village in Jičín District in the Hradec Králové Region of the Czech Republic. It has about 600 inhabitants.

== Demographics ==
Historical population
Year	Pop.	±%
1869	591	—
1880	675	+14.2%
1890	774	+14.7%
1900	754	−2.6%
1910	750	−0.5%
1921	725	−3.3%
1930	696	−4.0%
1950	533	−23.4%
1961	532	−0.2%
1970	553	+3.9%
1980	542	−2.0%
1991	523	−3.5%
2001	512	−2.1%
2011	589	+15.0%
2021	579	−1.7%
Source: Censuses
