= Vodice nad Kamnikom =

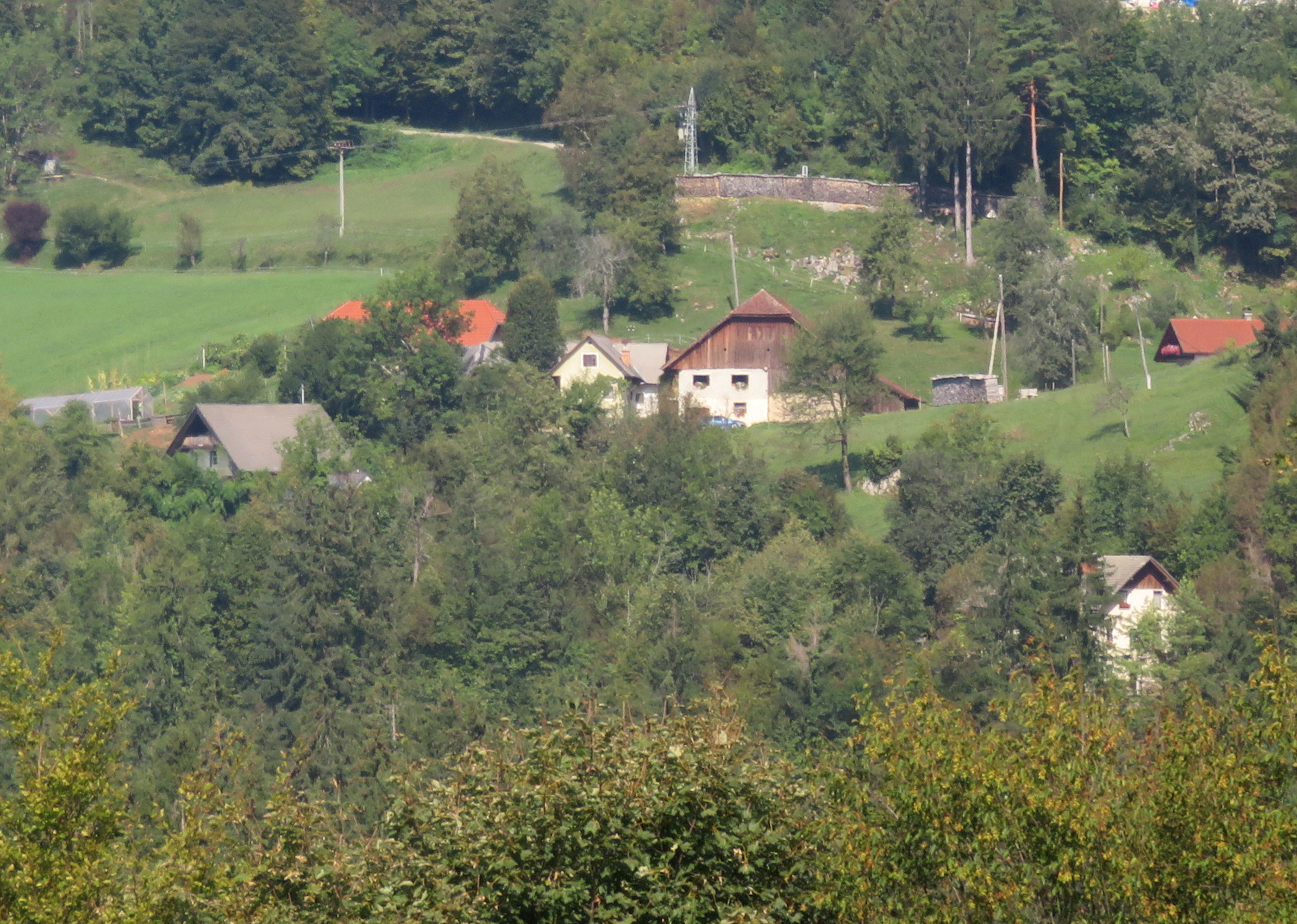

- Location in Slovenia
- Coordinates: 46°15′21.31″N 14°37′44.08″E
- Country: Slovenia
- Traditional region: Upper Carniola
- Statistical region: Central Slovenia
- Municipality: Kamnik

Area
  - Total: 1.39 km^{2} (0.54 sq mi)
- Elevation: 518.2 m (1,700 ft)

Population (2002)
  - Total: 22

Vodice nad Kamnikom (pronounced [ʋɔˈdiːtsɛ nat ˈkaːmnikɔm]) is a small settlement above Godič in the Municipality of Kamnik in the Upper Carniola region of Slovenia.

== Geography ==
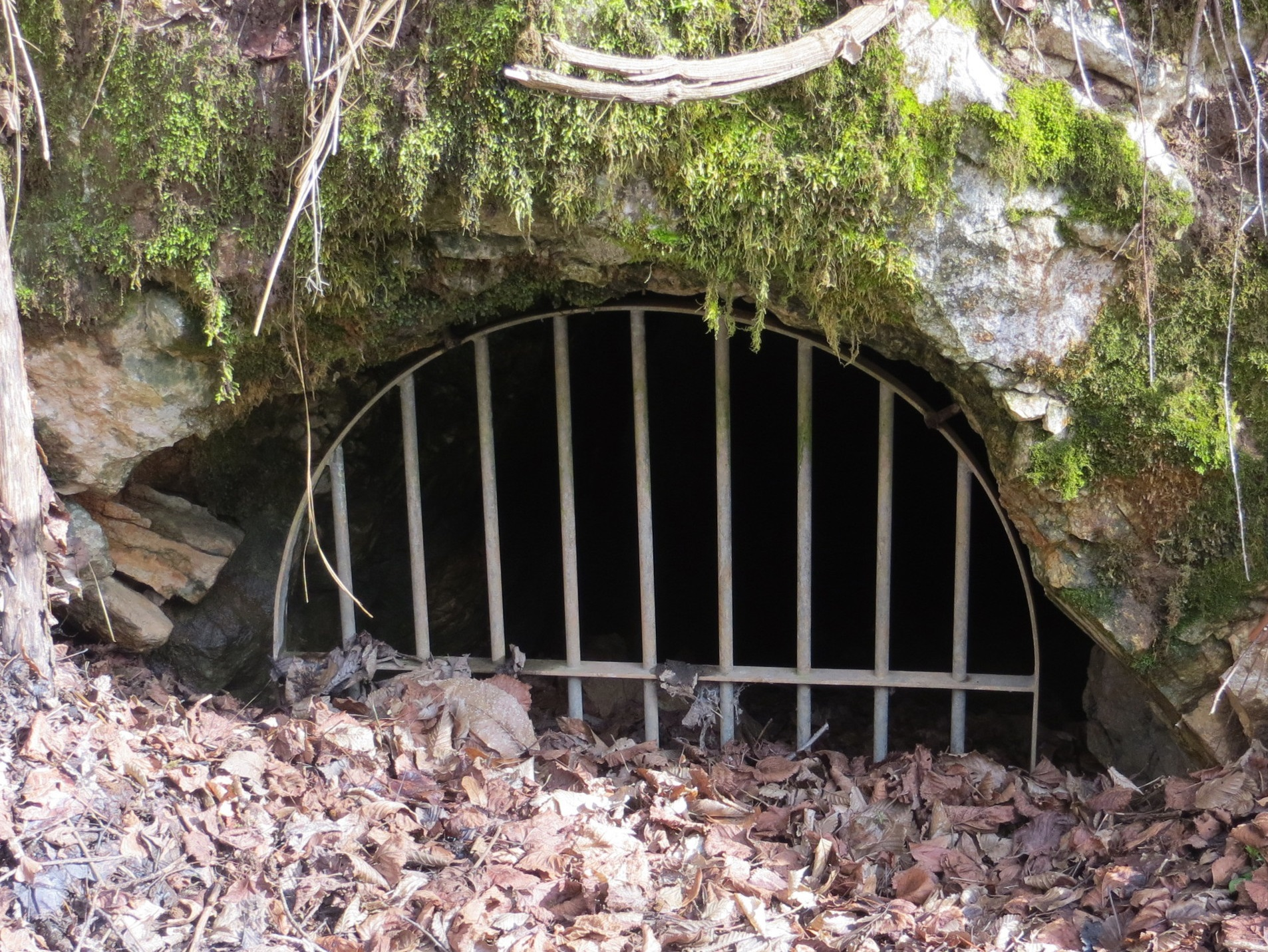
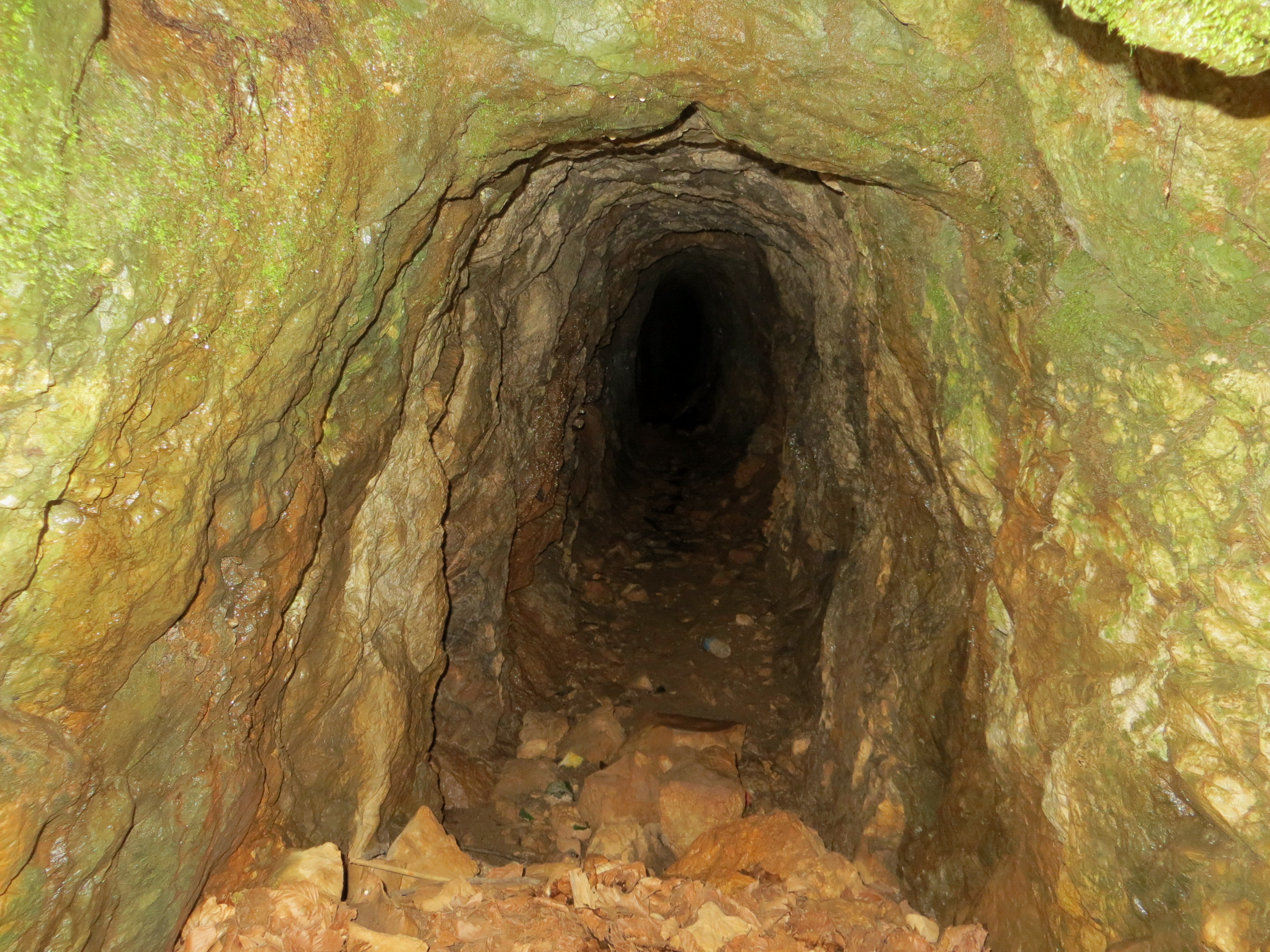
Cave entrance in Vodice nad Kamnikom

Vodice nad Kamnikom lies on a high level area on the northwest slope of Vovar Hill (940 meters or 3,080 feet). The lower end of the village is swampy, and in the higher parts the soil is loamy and stony with good sun exposure. Oševek Creek (a.k.a. Uševk), a tributary of the Nevljica River, starts at a spring south of the village center. The entrance to a natural cave that extends under Brezje nad Kamnikom lies along the road to Vodice nad Kamnikom.

== Name ==
The name of the settlement was changed from Vodice to Vodice nad Kamnikom (literally, 'Vodice above Kamnik') in 1953.
