= Bhoda Hoshnak =

- town
- Location in Haryana, India Bhoda Hoshnak (India)
- Coordinates: 29.352591°N 75.599023°E
- Country: India
- State: Haryana
- District: Fatehabad

Languages
  - Official: Hindi
- Time zone: UTC+5:30 (IST)
- ISO 3166 code: IN-HR
- Vehicle registration: HR
- Website: haryana.gov.in

Bhoda Hoshnak is a village in Fatehabad district of Haryana, India. It is 187 km west of Delhi on National Highway 9 (old NH10).
