= Dobrá Voda u Pacova =

- Municipality
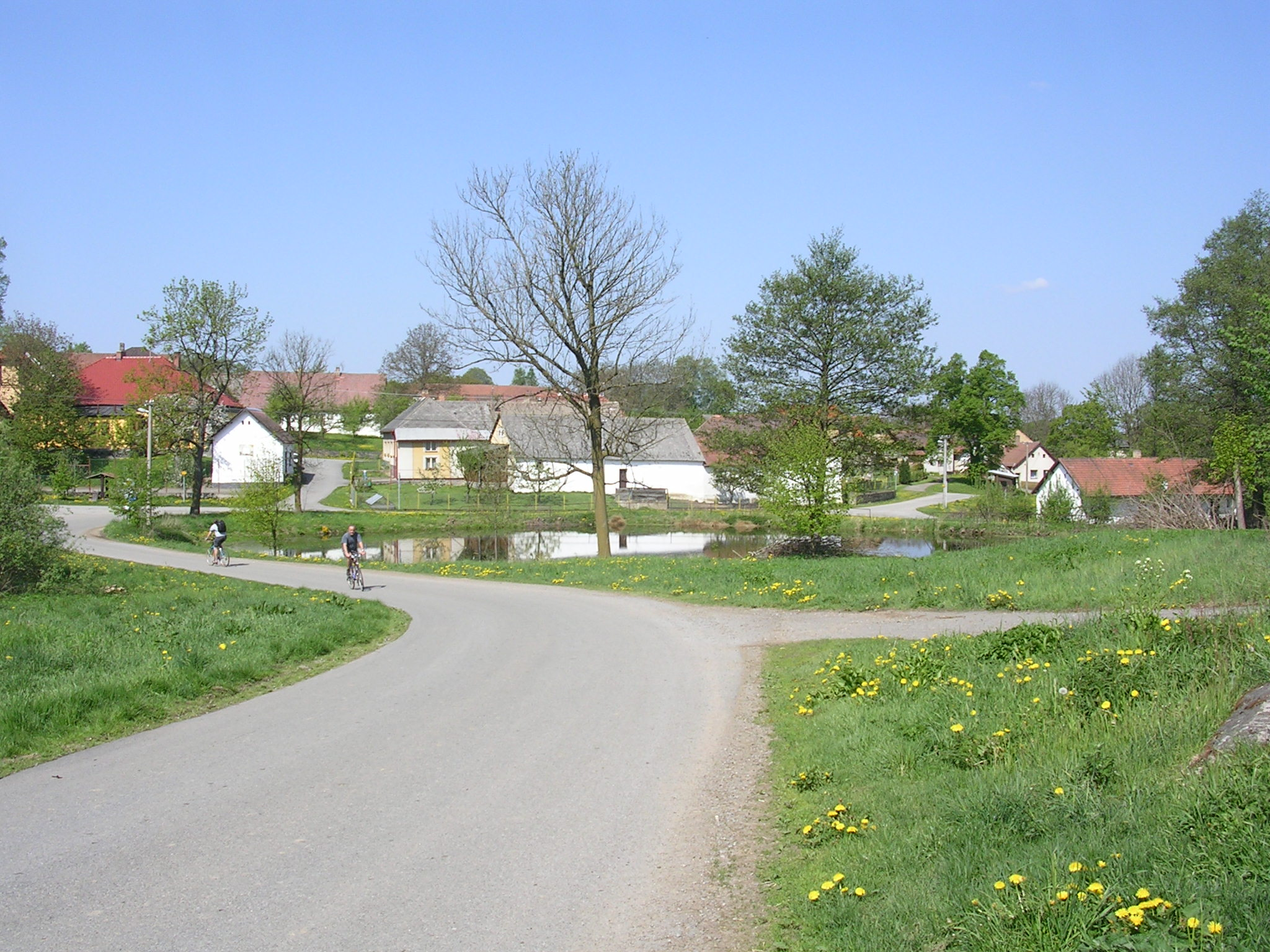
- Centre of Dobrá Voda u Pacova

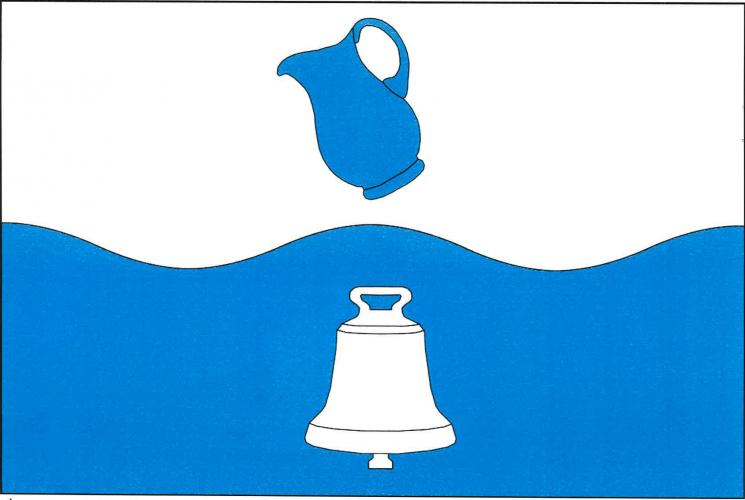
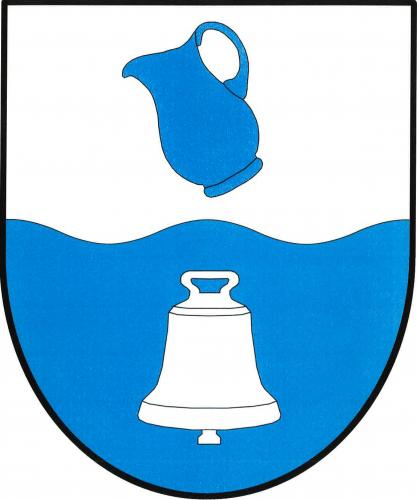
- Flag Coat of arms

- Location in the Czech Republic
- Coordinates: 49°24′16″N 15°1′40″E
- Country: Czech Republic
- Region: Vysočina
- District: Pelhřimov
- First mentioned: 1318

Area
  - Total: 4.16 km^{2} (1.61 sq mi)
- Elevation: 624 m (2,047 ft)

Population (2026-01-01)
  - Total: 108
  - Density: 26.0/km^{2} (67.2/sq mi)
- Time zone: UTC+1 (CET)
  - Summer (DST): UTC+2 (CEST)
- Postal code: 395 01
- Website: www.obecdobravoda.cz

Dobrá Voda u Pacova is a municipality and village in Pelhřimov District in the Vysočina Region of the Czech Republic. It has about 100 inhabitants.

Dobrá Voda u Pacova lies approximately 15 kilometres (9 mi) west of Pelhřimov, 41 km (25 mi) west of Jihlava, and 88 km (55 mi) south-east of Prague.

== Demographics ==
Historical population
Year	Pop.	±%
1869	256	—
1880	231	−9.8%
1890	247	+6.9%
1900	250	+1.2%
1910	235	−6.0%
1921	239	+1.7%
1930	201	−15.9%
1950	130	−35.3%
1961	108	−16.9%
1970	117	+8.3%
1980	94	−19.7%
1991	89	−5.3%
2001	80	−10.1%
2011	80	+0.0%
2021	89	+11.3%
Source: Censuses
