= Dobrá Voda (Žďár nad Sázavou District) =

- Municipality
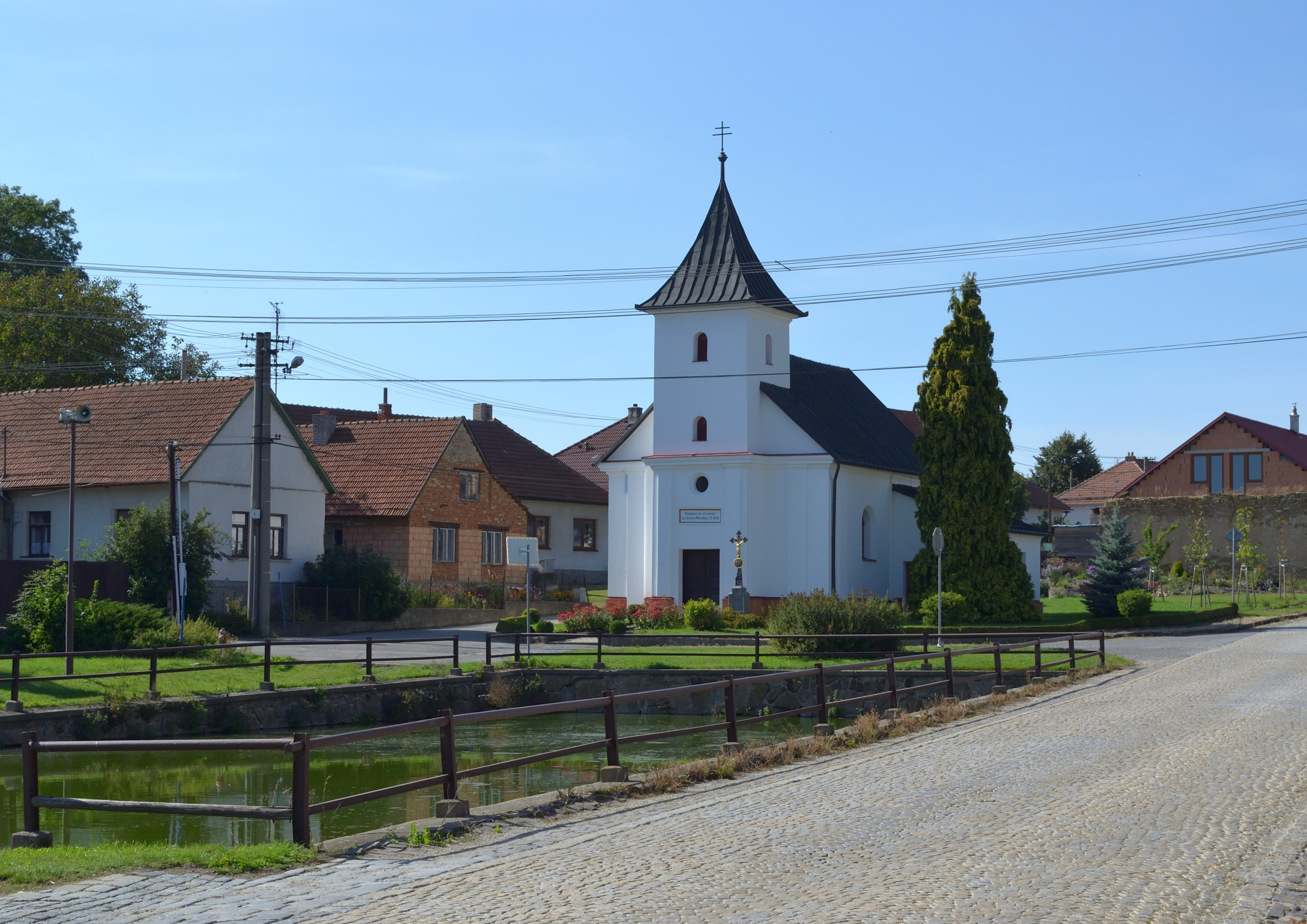
- Chapel of Saints Cyril and Methodius

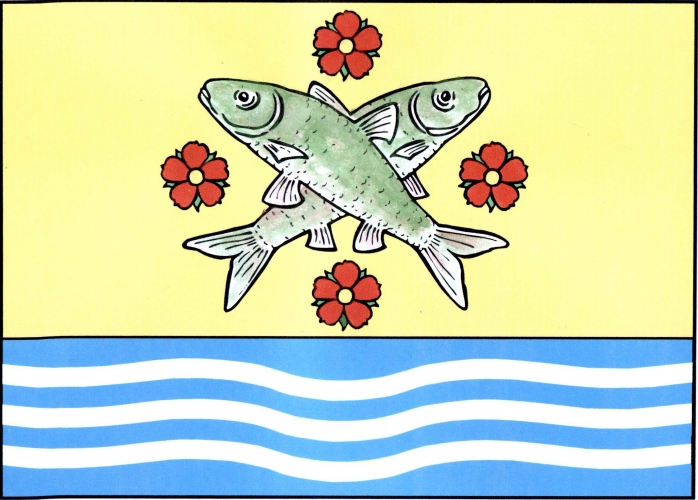
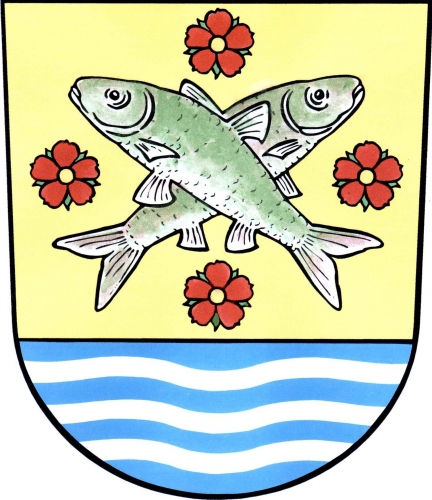
- Flag Coat of arms

- Location in the Czech Republic
- Coordinates: 49°23′38″N 16°3′54″E
- Country: Czech Republic
- Region: Vysočina
- District: Žďár nad Sázavou
- First mentioned: 1252

Area
  - Total: 8.30 km^{2} (3.20 sq mi)
- Elevation: 545 m (1,788 ft)

Population (2026-01-01)
  - Total: 408
  - Density: 49.2/km^{2} (127/sq mi)
- Time zone: UTC+1 (CET)
  - Summer (DST): UTC+2 (CEST)
- Postal code: 594 51
- Website: www.obec-dobravoda.cz

Dobrá Voda is a municipality and village in Žďár nad Sázavou District in the Vysočina Region of the Czech Republic. It has about 400 inhabitants.

Dobrá Voda is situated approximately 21 kilometres (13 mi) south-east of Žďár nad Sázavou, 35 km (22 mi) east of Jihlava, and 141 km (88 mi) south-east of Prague.

== Demographics ==
Historical population
Year	Pop.	±%
1869	558	—
1880	496	−11.1%
1890	493	−0.6%
1900	511	+3.7%
1910	509	−0.4%
1921	465	−8.6%
1930	488	+4.9%
1950	401	−17.8%
1961	397	−1.0%
1970	364	−8.3%
1980	347	−4.7%
1991	329	−5.2%
2001	342	+4.0%
2011	328	−4.1%
2021	346	+5.5%
Source: Censuses
