= Vodice, Zagorje ob Savi =

Vodice
- Location in Slovenia
- Coordinates: 46°7′30″N 14°57′30″E
- Country: Slovenia
- Traditional region: Upper Carniola
- Statistical region: Central Sava
- Municipality: Zagorje ob Savi
- Elevation: 705 m (2,313 ft)

Vodice (pronounced [ʋɔˈdiːtsɛ], German: Wodize) is a former village in central Slovenia in the Municipality of Zagorje ob Savi. It is now part of the village of Jablana. It is part of the traditional region of Upper Carniola and is now included in the Central Sava Statistical Region.

== Geography ==
Vodice stands northeast of the village center of Jablana. It is accessible by a side road that passes below Holy Cross Church parallel to the main road to Čolnišče.

== Name ==
The name Vodice is ultimately derived from the Slovene common noun vodica, a diminutive of voda 'water, creek'. The name may therefore be based on the singular locative form *Vodicě (literally, 'by the small creek'), or it may have originally been plural, referring to springs in the area.

== History ==
Vodice had a population of 28 (in three houses) in 1890 and 21 (in three houses) in 1900. Together with Kal, Vodice was annexed by Jablana in 1953, ending its existence as a separate settlement.
