= Červená Voda =

Červená Voda may refer to places:

- Červená Voda (Ústí nad Orlicí District), a municipality and village in the Pardubice Region of the Czech Republic
- Červená Voda, Sabinov District, a municipality and village in the Prešov Region of Slovakia

== See also ==
- Stará Červená Voda
