= Bela Voda (Kruševac) =

Coordinates: 43.6172°N 21.1983°E

- Village
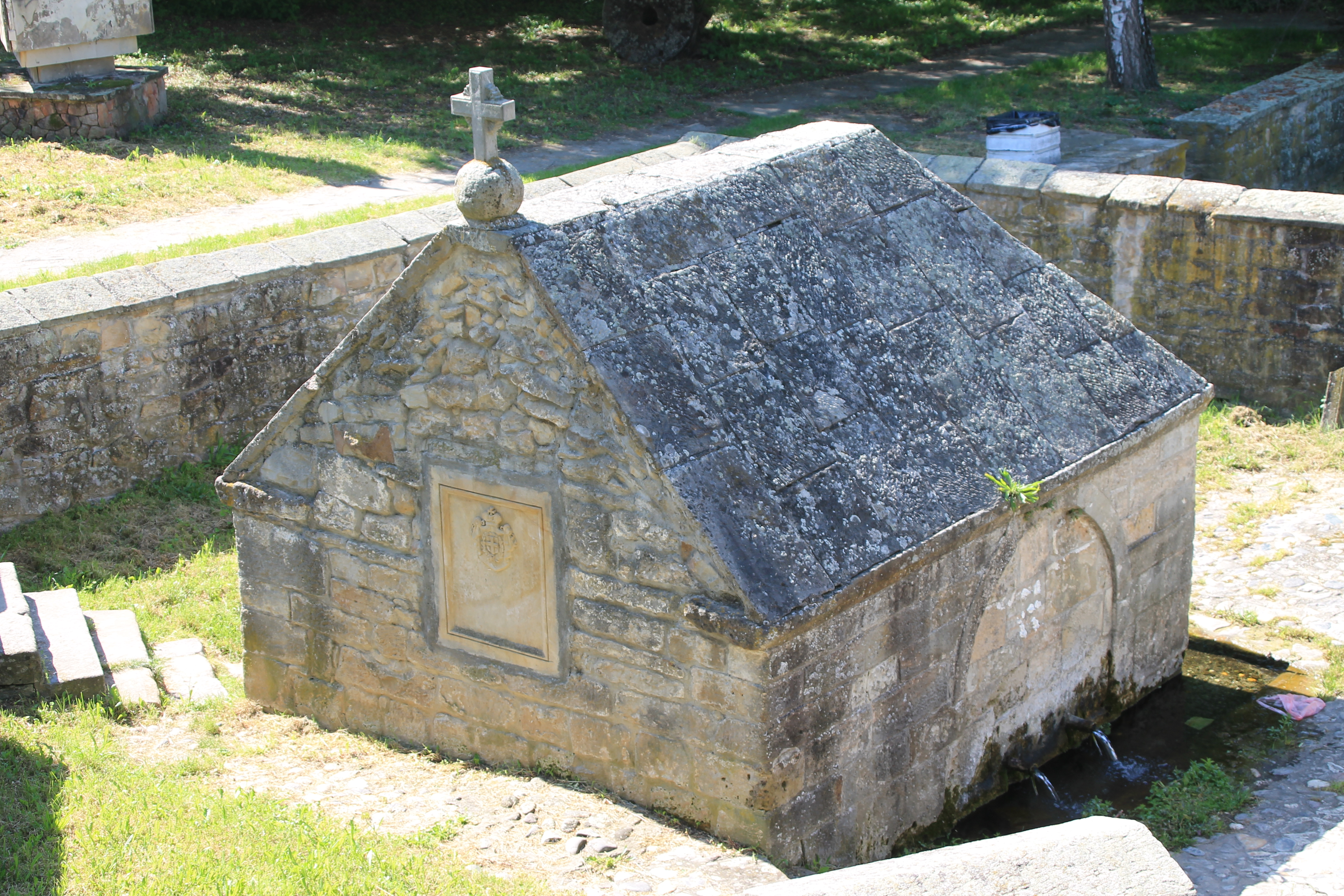
- Interactive map of Bela Voda
- Country: Serbia
- District: Rasina District
- Municipality: Kruševac

Population (2002)
  - Total: 1,387
- Time zone: UTC+1 (CET)
  - Summer (DST): UTC+2 (CEST)

Bela Voda is a village in the municipality of Kruševac, Serbia. According to the 2002 census, the village has a population of 1387 people.
