= Dobrá Voda (Pelhřimov District) =

- Municipality
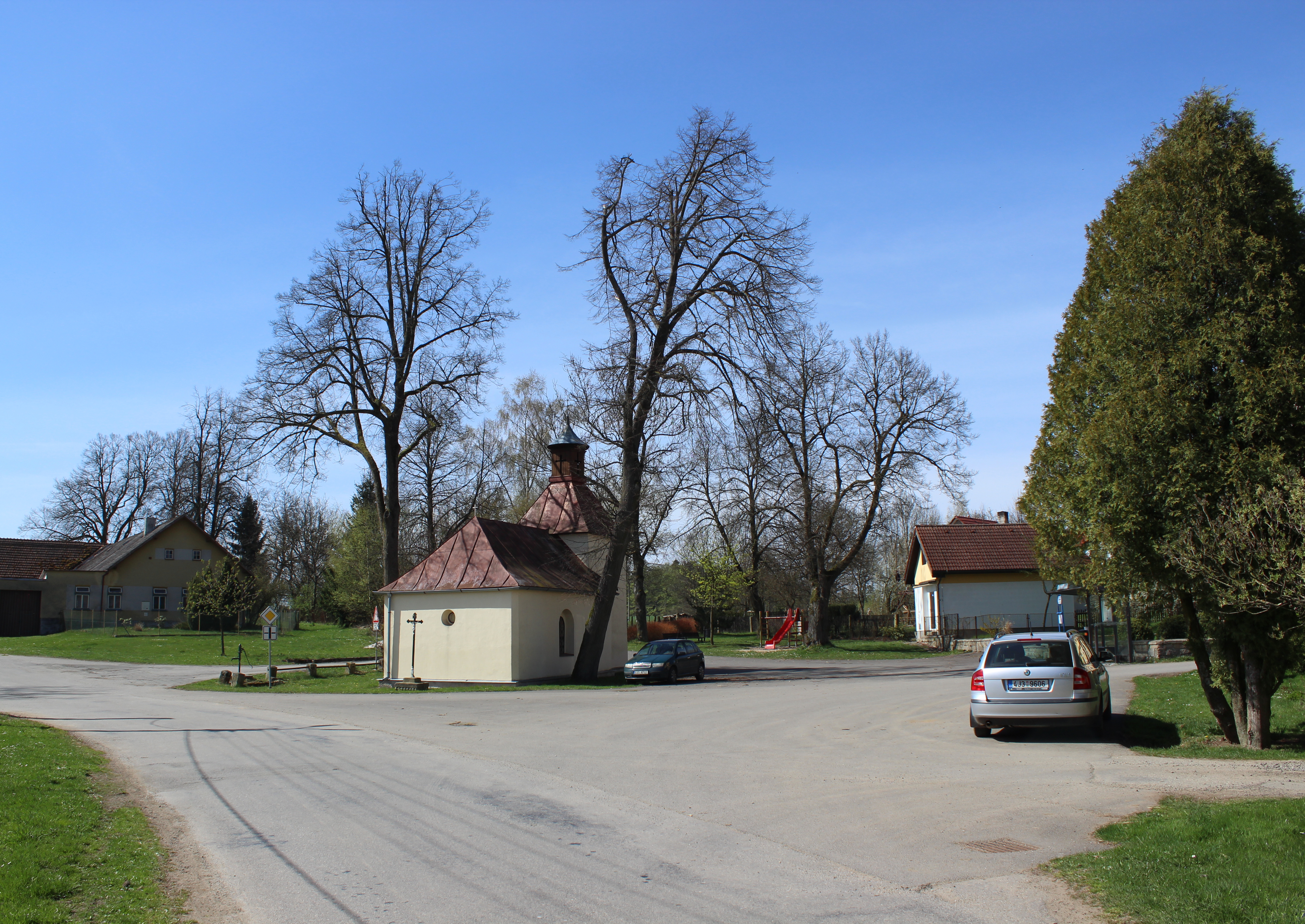
- Centre of Dobrá Voda

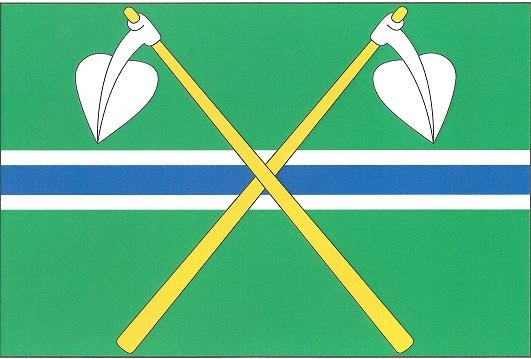
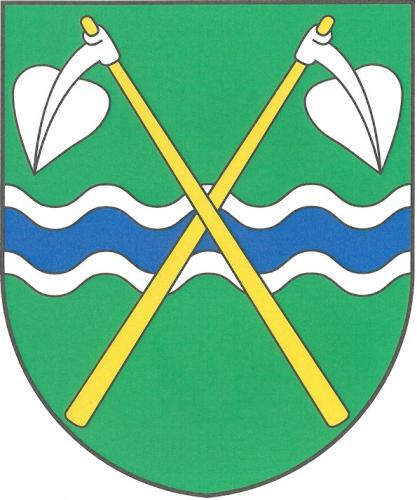
- Flag Coat of arms

- Location in the Czech Republic
- Coordinates: 49°21′30″N 15°16′12″E
- Country: Czech Republic
- Region: Vysočina
- District: Pelhřimov
- First mentioned: 1414

Area
  - Total: 8.41 km^{2} (3.25 sq mi)
- Elevation: 643 m (2,110 ft)

Population (2026-01-01)
  - Total: 209
  - Density: 24.9/km^{2} (64.4/sq mi)
- Time zone: UTC+1 (CET)
  - Summer (DST): UTC+2 (CEST)
- Postal code: 393 01
- Website: www.obec-dobra-voda.cz

Dobrá Voda is a municipality and village in Pelhřimov District in the Vysočina Region of the Czech Republic. It has about 200 inhabitants.

Dobrá Voda lies approximately 9 kilometres (6 mi) south-east of Pelhřimov, 24 km (15 mi) west of Jihlava, and 102 km (63 mi) south-east of Prague.

== Administrative division ==
Dobrá Voda consists of three municipal parts (in brackets population according to the 2021 census):

- Dobrá Voda (123)
- Letny (24)
- Rohovka (34)

== History ==
The first written mention of Dobrá Voda is from 1414.

== Demographics ==
Historical population
| Year | Pop. | ±% |
|---|---|---|
| 1869 | 485 | — |
| 1880 | 514 | +6.0% |
| 1890 | 443 | −13.8% |
| 1900 | 432 | −2.5% |
| 1910 | 412 | −4.6% |
| 1921 | 411 | −0.2% |
| 1930 | 410 | −0.2% |
| 1950 | 288 | −29.8% |
| 1961 | 308 | +6.9% |
| 1970 | 299 | −2.9% |
| 1980 | 259 | −13.4% |
| 1991 | 254 | −1.9% |
| 2001 | 214 | −15.7% |
| 2011 | 192 | −10.3% |
| 2021 | 181 | −5.7% |
Source: Censuses
