= Dobrá Voda u Českých Budějovic =

- Municipality
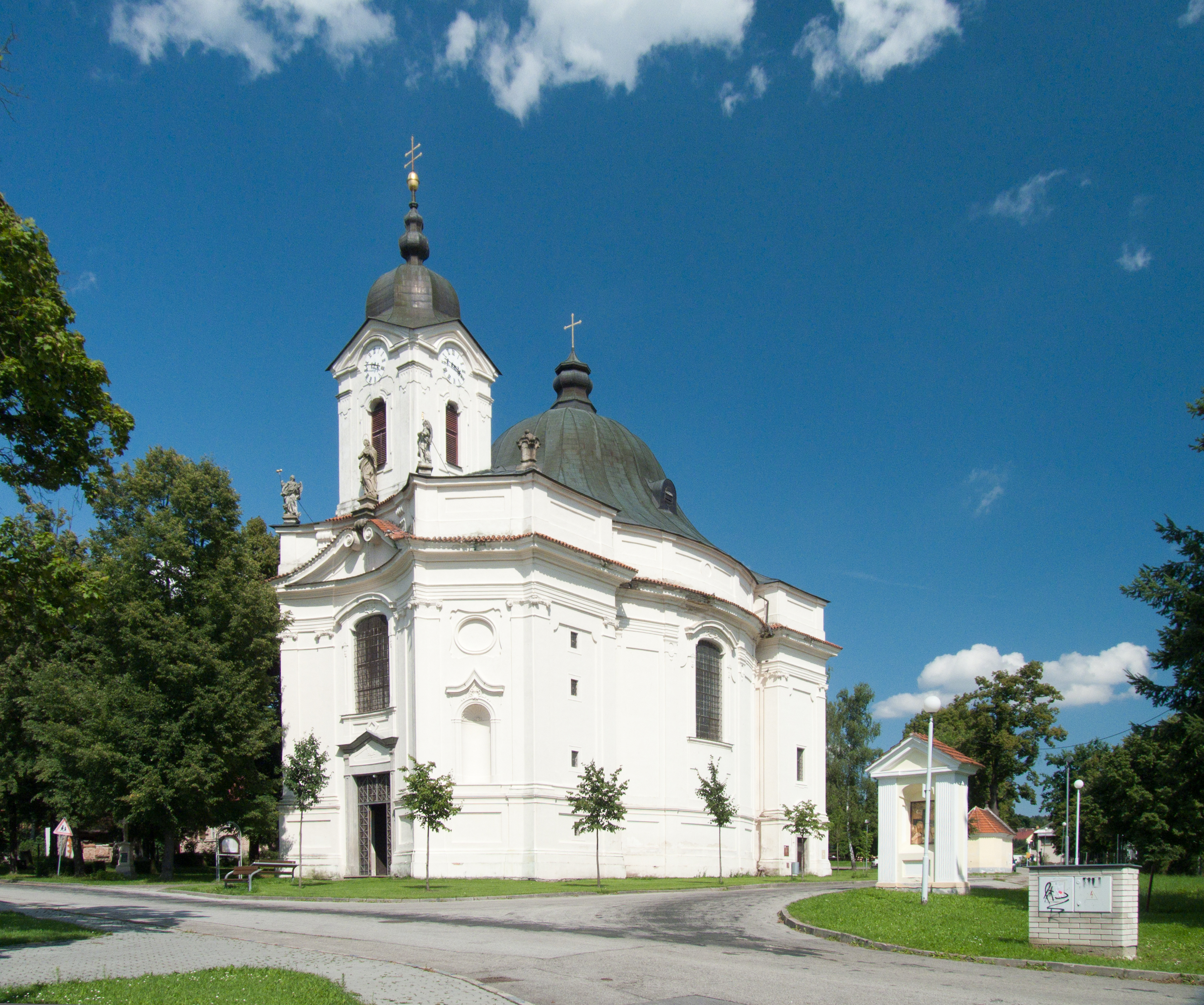
- Church of Our Lady of Sorrows

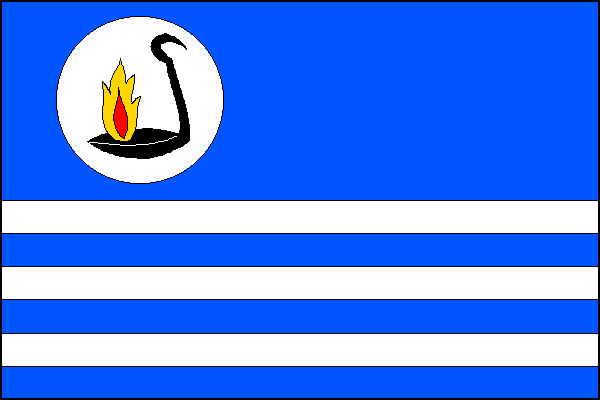
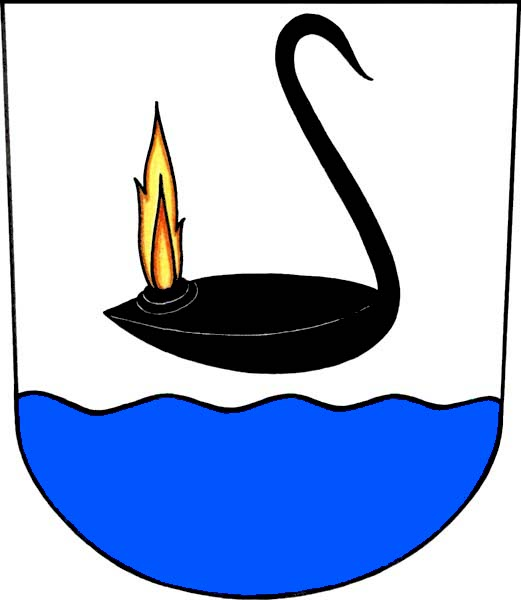
- Flag Coat of arms

- Location in the Czech Republic
- Coordinates: 48°58′6″N 14°31′30″E
- Country: Czech Republic
- Region: South Bohemian
- District: České Budějovice
- First mentioned: 1720

Area
  - Total: 1.55 km^{2} (0.60 sq mi)
- Elevation: 450 m (1,480 ft)

Population (2026-01-01)
  - Total: 2,625
  - Density: 1,690/km^{2} (4,390/sq mi)
- Time zone: UTC+1 (CET)
  - Summer (DST): UTC+2 (CEST)
- Postal code: 373 16
- Website: www.dobravodaucb.cz

Dobrá Voda u Českých Budějovic (German: Gutwasser) is a municipality and village in České Budějovice District in the South Bohemian Region of the Czech Republic. It has about 2,600 inhabitants.

== Etymology ==
The name literally means 'good water'. It refers to a spring of allegedly healing water, above which a chapel was founded.

== Geography ==
Dobrá Voda u Českých Budějovic is located about east of České Budějovice, in its immediate vicinity. It lies mostly in the Třeboň Basin, only the western part of the municipal territory extends into the České Budějovice Basin. The highest point is at 505 m (1,657 ft) above sea level. The municipality is urbanistically fused with neighbouring Srubec.

== History ==
The first written mention of Dobrá Voda is from 1720.

== Demographics ==
Historical population

Year	Pop.	±%
1869	249	—
1880	277	+11.2%
1890	327	+18.1%
1900	329	+0.6%
1910	661	+100.9%

Year	Pop.	±%
1921	735	+11.2%
1930	984	+33.9%
1950	908	−7.7%
1961	1,056	+16.3%
1970	1,519	+43.8%

Year	Pop.	±%
1980	2,252	+48.3%
1991	2,251	−0.0%
2001	2,373	+5.4%
2011	2,649	+11.6%
2021	2,800	+5.7%

Source: Censuses

== Transport ==
There are no railways or major roads passing through the municipality.

== Sights ==
The main landmark is the Church of Our Lady of Sorrows. It was built in the Baroque style in 1733–1735, probably according to the design by the architect Kilian Ignaz Dientzenhofer. It is known as a pilgrimage site.
