= Jedlá =

- Municipality
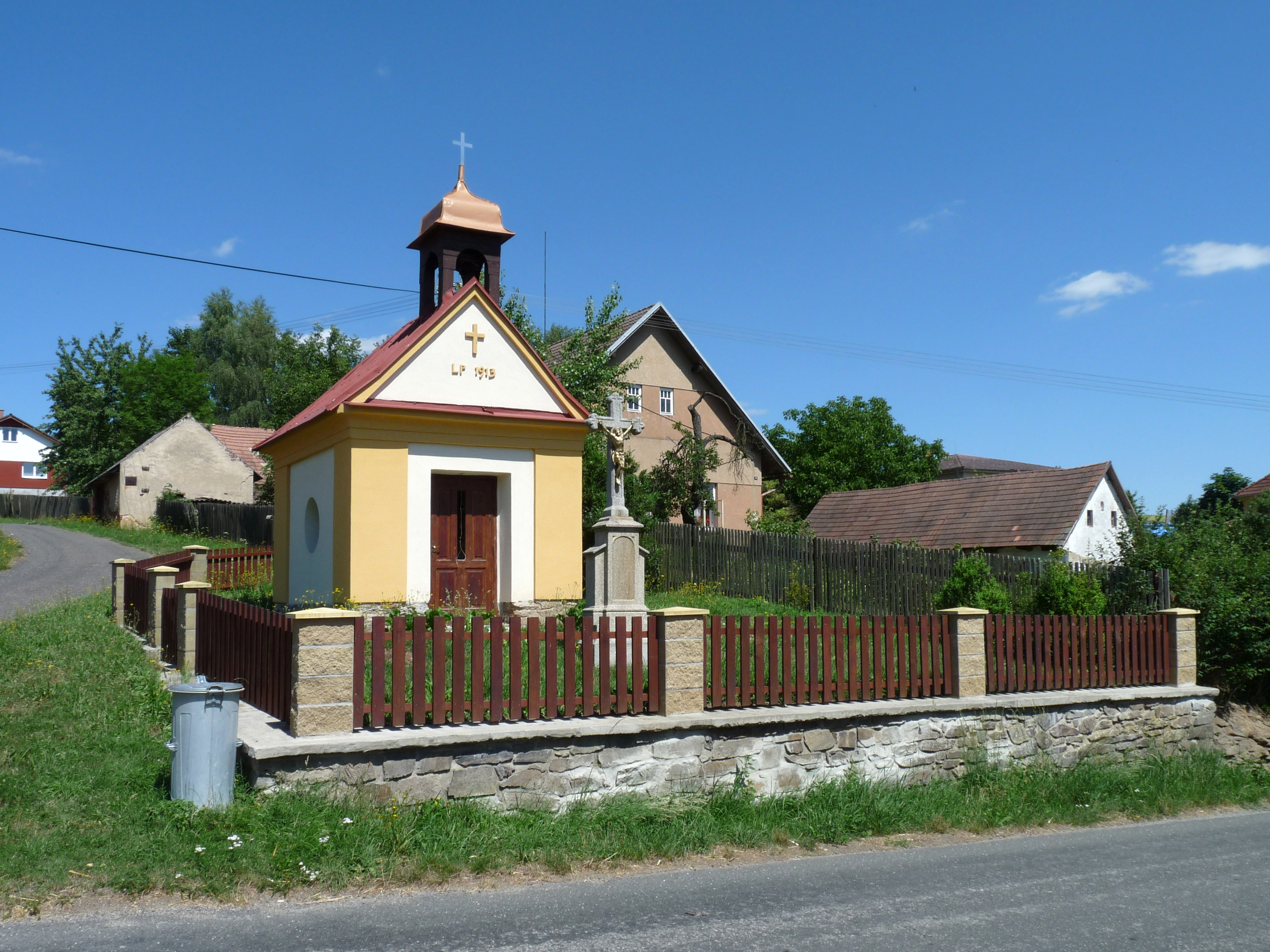
- Chapel in Jedlá

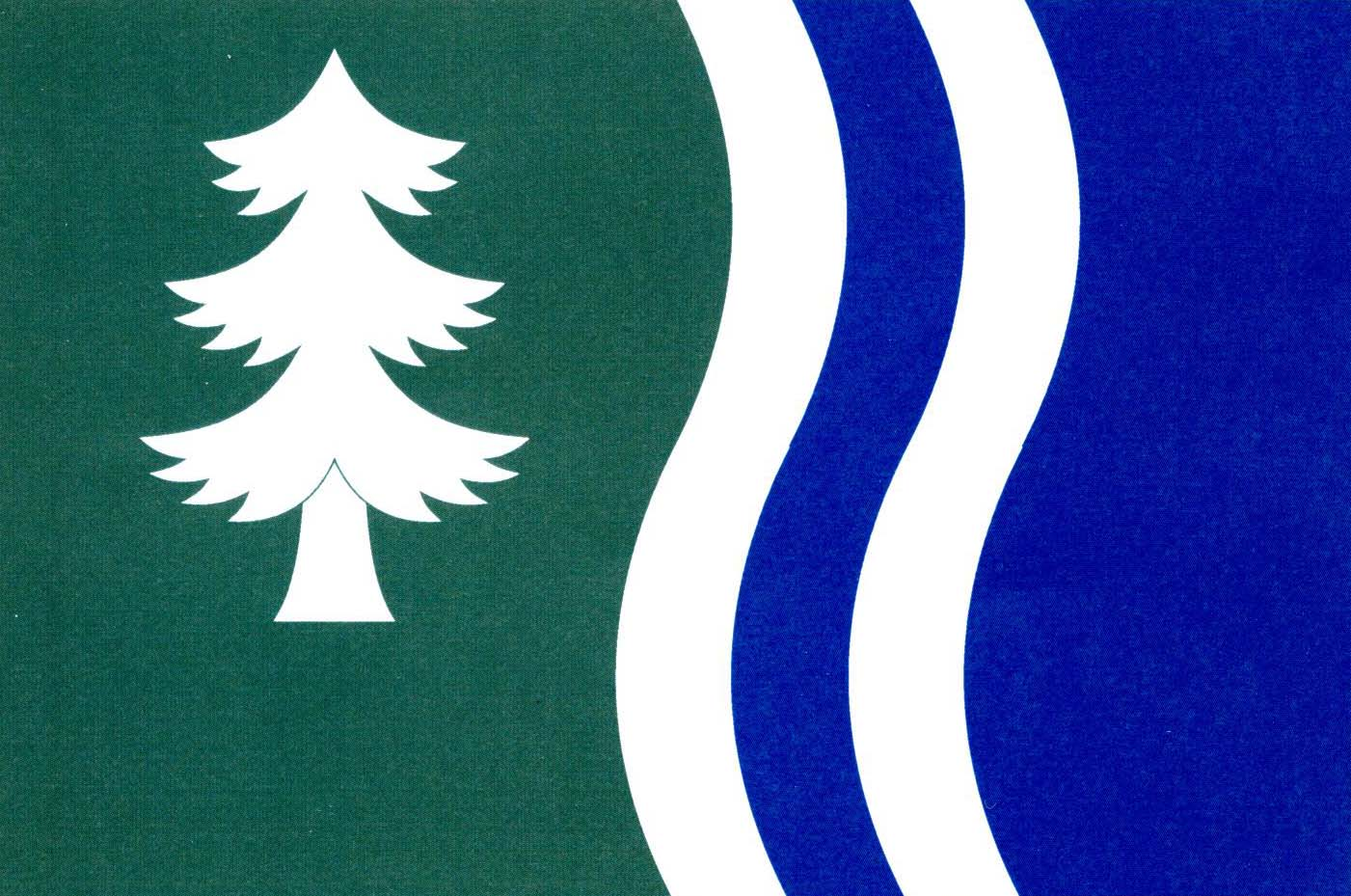
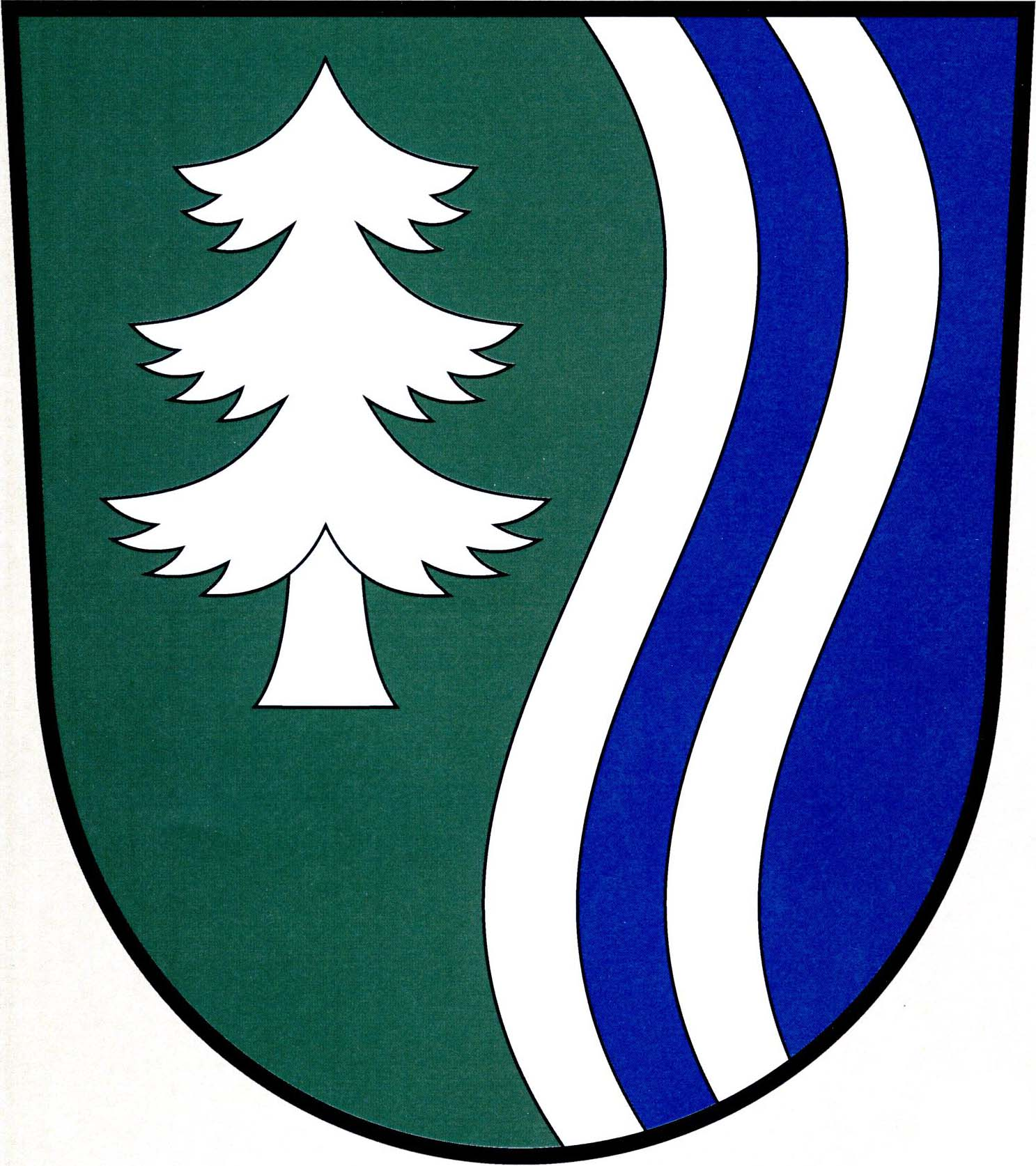
- Flag Coat of arms

- Location in the Czech Republic
- Coordinates: 49°44′17″N 15°14′4″E
- Country: Czech Republic
- Region: Vysočina
- District: Havlíčkův Brod
- First mentioned: 1554

Area
  - Total: 6.25 km^{2} (2.41 sq mi)
- Elevation: 515 m (1,690 ft)

Population (2026-01-01)
  - Total: 84
  - Density: 13/km^{2} (35/sq mi)
- Time zone: UTC+1 (CET)
  - Summer (DST): UTC+2 (CEST)
- Postal code: 584 01
- Website: jedla-dobravoda.cz

Jedlá is a municipality and village in Havlíčkův Brod District in the Vysočina Region of the Czech Republic. It has about 80 inhabitants.

Jedlá lies approximately 29 kilometres (18 mi) north-west of Havlíčkův Brod, 46 km (29 mi) north-west of Jihlava, and 71 km (44 mi) south-east of Prague.

== Administrative division ==
Jedlá consists of two municipal parts (in brackets population according to the 2021 census):

- Jedlá (45)
- Dobrá Voda (38)

== Demographics ==
Historical population
Year	Pop.	±%
1869	293	—
1880	288	−1.7%
1890	272	−5.6%
1900	253	−7.0%
1910	267	+5.5%
1921	245	−8.2%
1930	206	−15.9%
1950	195	−5.3%
1961	196	+0.5%
1970	148	−24.5%
1980	119	−19.6%
1991	86	−27.7%
2001	61	−29.1%
2011	80	+31.1%
2021	83	+3.8%
Source: Censuses
