= Bhoda, Jalandhar =

Bhoda
- Village
- Country: India
- State: Punjab
- District: Jalandhar
- Tehsil: Phillaur

Government
  - Type: Panchayat raj
  - Body: Gram panchayat

Area
  - Total: 207 ha (510 acres)

Population (2011)
  - Total: 824; 445/379 ♂/♀
  - Scheduled Castes: 669; 354/315 ♂/♀
  - Total Households: 171

Languages
  - Official: Punjabi
- Time zone: UTC+5:30 (IST)
- Telephone: 01826
- ISO 3166 code: IN-PB
- Vehicle registration: PB-37
- Website: jalandhar.gov.in

Bhoda is a village in Phillaur in Jalandhar district of Punjab State, India. It is located 12 kilometres (7.5 mi) from sub district headquarter and 40 kilometres (25 mi) from district headquarter. The village is administrated by Sarpanch an elected representative of the village.

== Demography ==
As of 2011, the village has a total number of 171 houses and a population of 824 of which 445 are males while 379 are females. According to the report published by Census India in 2011, out of the total population of the village 669 people are from Schedule Caste and the village does not have any Schedule Tribe population so far.

== See also ==
- List of villages in India
