= Dobra Voda (Modriča) =

Dobra Voda Добра Вода (Serbian)
- Village (Selo)
- Location within Bosnia and Herzegovina
- Coordinates: 44°59′33″N 18°08′56″E
- Country: Bosnia and Herzegovina
- Republic: Republika Srpska
- Municipality: Modriča

Population (1991)
  - Total: 89
- Time zone: UTC+1 (CET)
  - Summer (DST): UTC+2 (CEST)

Dobra Voda is a village in the municipality of Modriča, Republika Srpska, Bosnia and Herzegovina.
