= Stará Voda =

Stará Voda may refer to places:

== Czech Republic ==
- Stará Voda (Cheb District), a municipality and village in the Karlovy Vary Region
- Stará Voda (Hradec Králové District), a municipality and village in the Hradec Králové Region
- Stará Voda, a village and part of Horčápsko in the Central Bohemian Region
- Stará Voda, a village and part of Světlá Hora in the Moravian-Silesian Region

== Slovakia ==
- Stará Voda, Gelnica District, a municipality and village
