= Mladoňovice (Třebíč District) =

- Municipality
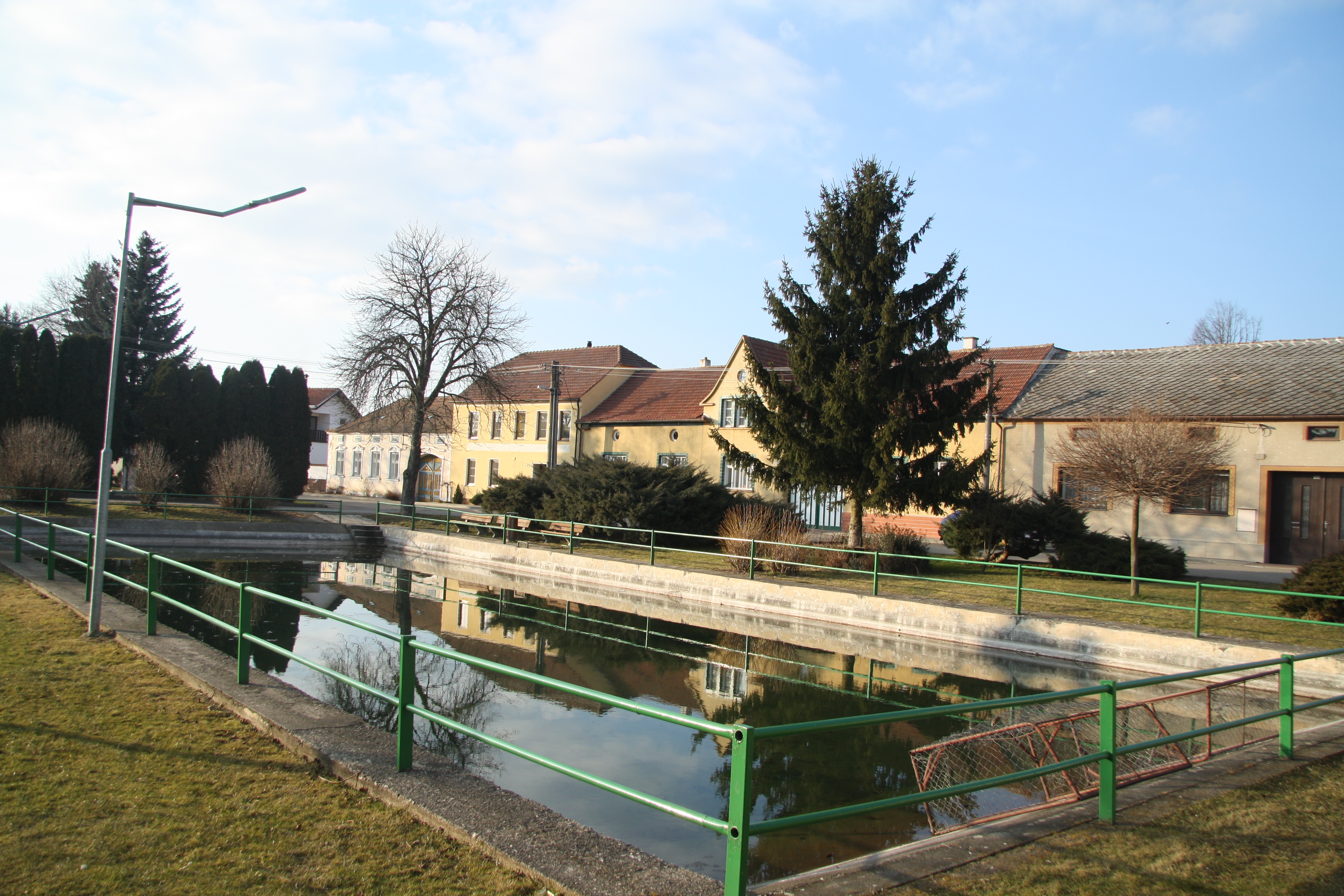
- Centre of Mladoňovice

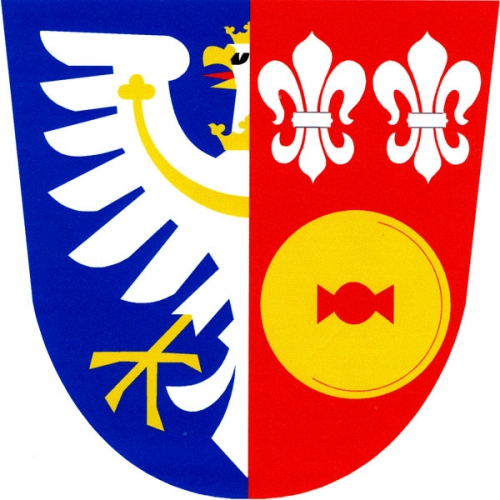
- Flag Coat of arms

- Location in the Czech Republic
- Coordinates: 49°0′37″N 15°38′37″E
- Country: Czech Republic
- Region: Vysočina
- District: Třebíč
- First mentioned: 1319

Area
  - Total: 10.01 km^{2} (3.86 sq mi)
- Elevation: 452 m (1,483 ft)

Population (2026-01-01)
  - Total: 391
  - Density: 39.1/km^{2} (101/sq mi)
- Time zone: UTC+1 (CET)
  - Summer (DST): UTC+2 (CEST)
- Postal code: 675 32
- Website: www.mladonovice.cz

Mladoňovice is a municipality and village in Třebíč District in the Vysočina Region of the Czech Republic. It has about 400 inhabitants.

Mladoňovice lies approximately 29 kilometres (18 mi) south-west of Třebíč, 44 km (27 mi) south of Jihlava, and 149 km (93 mi) south-east of Prague.

== Demographics ==
Historical population
Year	Pop.	±%
1869	429	—
1880	411	−4.2%
1890	473	+15.1%
1900	483	+2.1%
1910	487	+0.8%
1921	540	+10.9%
1930	525	−2.8%
1950	457	−13.0%
1961	430	−5.9%
1970	409	−4.9%
1980	375	−8.3%
1991	370	−1.3%
2001	370	+0.0%
2011	383	+3.5%
2021	373	−2.6%
Source: Censuses
