= Sveti Štefan =

Sveti Štefan may refer to several places in Slovenia:

- Štefan pri Trebnjem, a settlement in the Municipality of Trebnje, known as Sveti Štefan until 1955
- Sveti Štefan, Šmarje pri Jelšah, a settlement in the Municipality of Šmarje pri Jelšah
- Turje, Hrastnik, a settlement in the Municipality of Hrastnik, known as Sveti Štefan until 1955
