= Dolenji Podboršt pri Trebnjem =

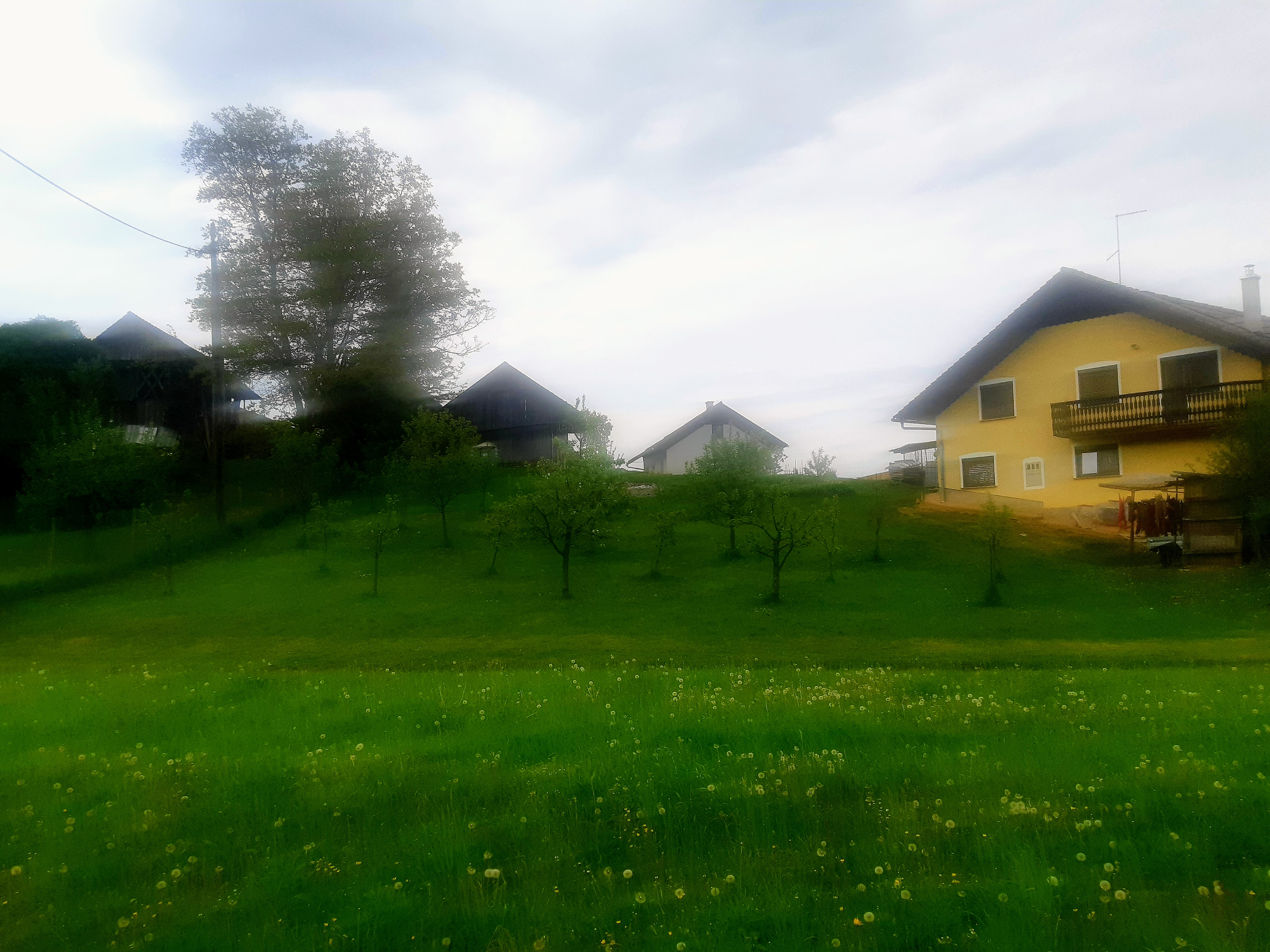

- Location in Slovenia
- Coordinates: 45°54′6.55″N 15°1′25.01″E
- Country: Slovenia
- Traditional region: Lower Carniola
- Statistical region: Southeast Slovenia
- Municipality: Trebnje
- Elevation: 285 m (935 ft)

Population (2002)
  - Total: 38

Dolenji Podboršt pri Trebnjem (pronounced [dɔˈleːnji pɔdˈbɔɾʃt pɾi ˈtɾeːbnjɛm]) is a small settlement on the right bank of the Temenica River southeast of Trebnje in eastern Slovenia. The area is part of the traditional region of Lower Carniola. The Municipality of Trebnje is now included in the Southeast Slovenia Statistical Region.

== Name ==
The name of the settlement was changed from Dolenji Podboršt to Dolenji Podboršt pri Trebnjem in 1953.
