= Vrhtrebnje =

- Location in Slovenia
- Coordinates: 45°53′41.97″N 14°59′56.26″E
- Country: Slovenia
- Traditional region: Lower Carniola
- Statistical region: Southeast Slovenia
- Municipality: Trebnje

Area
  - Total: 1.2 km^{2} (0.46 sq mi)
- Elevation: 530.9 m (1,742 ft)

Population (2002)
  - Total: 74

Vrhtrebnje (pronounced [ʋəɾxˈtɾeːbnjɛ]) is a village in the Municipality of Trebnje in eastern Slovenia. It lies in the hills south of Trebnje. The area is part of the historical region of Lower Carniola. The municipality is now included in the Southeast Slovenia Statistical Region.

The local church is dedicated to Saint James (Slovene: sveti Jakob) and belongs to the Parish of Trebnje. It dates to the 16th century.
