= Veliki Videm =

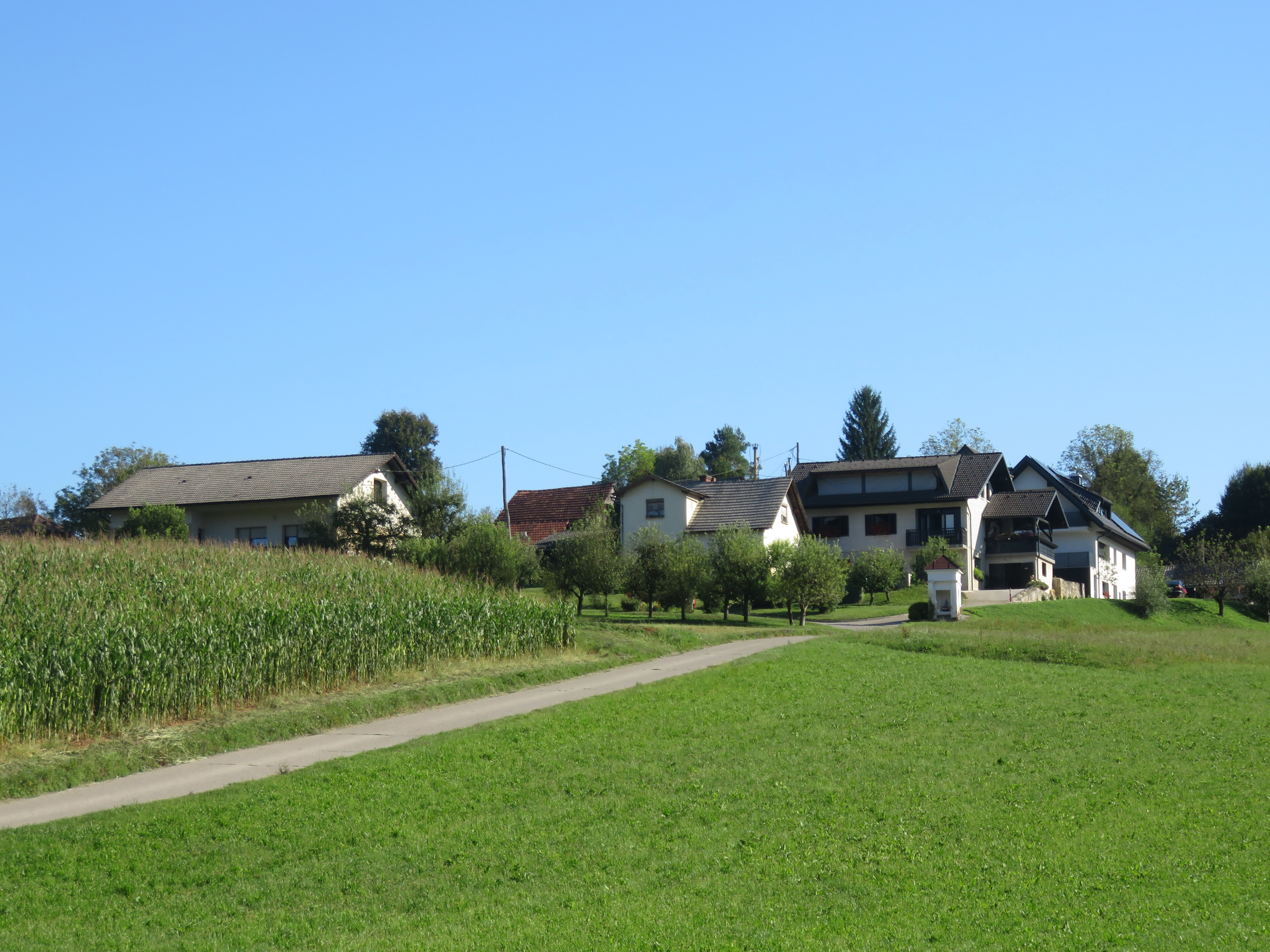

- Location in Slovenia
- Coordinates: 45°57′0.04″N 14°56′38.62″E
- Country: Slovenia
- Traditional region: Lower Carniola
- Statistical region: Southeast Slovenia
- Municipality: Trebnje

Area
  - Total: 0.91 km^{2} (0.35 sq mi)
- Elevation: 363.4 m (1,192 ft)

Population (2002)
  - Total: 59

Veliki Videm (pronounced [ˈʋeːliki ˈʋiːdəm]) is a small settlement north of Šentlovrenc in the Municipality of Trebnje in eastern Slovenia. The area is part of the traditional region of Lower Carniola. The Municipality of Trebnje is now included in the Southeast Slovenia Statistical Region.
