= Meglenik =

- Location in Slovenia
- Coordinates: 45°54′40.22″N 15°3′23.22″E
- Country: Slovenia
- Traditional region: Lower Carniola
- Statistical region: Southeast Slovenia
- Municipality: Trebnje

Area
  - Total: 0.39 km^{2} (0.15 sq mi)
- Elevation: 332.9 m (1,092 ft)

Population (2002)
  - Total: 24

Meglenik (pronounced [mɛˈɡleːnik]) is a small settlement northeast of Trebnje in the traditional region of Lower Carniola in Slovenia. The Municipality of Trebnje is now included in the Southeast Slovenia Statistical Region.
