= Dolenje Kamenje pri Dobrniču =

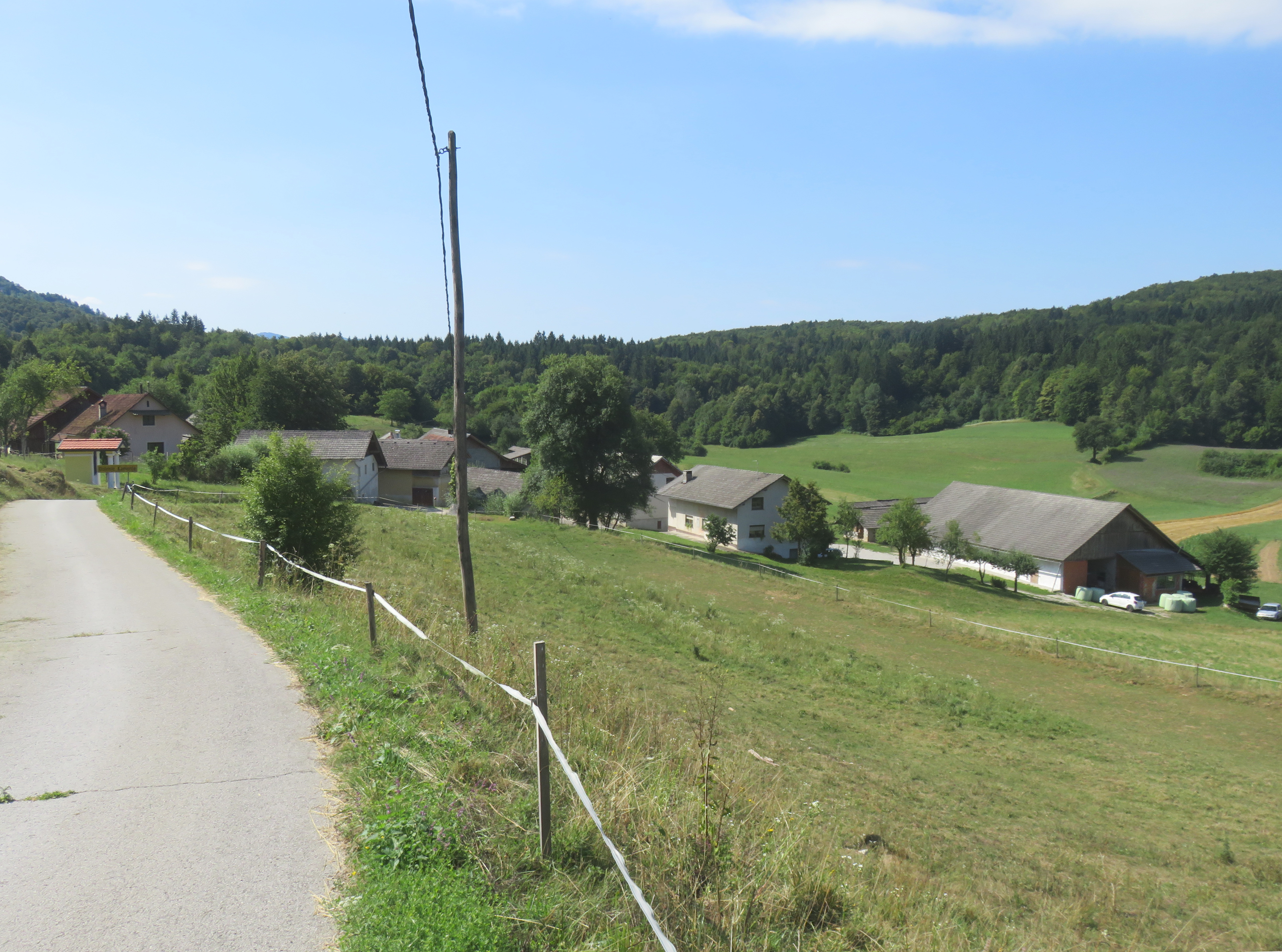

- Location in Slovenia
- Coordinates: 45°53′10.82″N 14°56′19.64″E
- Country: Slovenia
- Traditional region: Lower Carniola
- Statistical region: Southeast Slovenia
- Municipality: Trebnje

Area
  - Total: 1.52 km^{2} (0.59 sq mi)
- Elevation: 294.2 m (965 ft)

Population (2002)
  - Total: 14

Dolenje Kamenje pri Dobrniču (pronounced [dɔˈleːnjɛ ˈkaːmɛnjɛ pɾi ˈdoːbəɾnitʃu]) is a small settlement west of Dobrnič in the Municipality of Trebnje in southeastern Slovenia. The area is part of the historical region of Lower Carniola. The Municipality of Trebnje is now included in the Southeast Slovenia Statistical Region.

== Name ==
The name of the settlement was changed from Dolenje Kamenje to Dolenje Kamenje pri Dobrniču in 1953.
