= Korenitka =

- Location in Slovenia
- Coordinates: 45°55′2.26″N 14°56′48.76″E
- Country: Slovenia
- Traditional region: Lower Carniola
- Statistical region: Southeast Slovenia
- Municipality: Trebnje

Area
  - Total: 1.77 km^{2} (0.68 sq mi)
- Elevation: 335.5 m (1,101 ft)

Population (2002)
  - Total: 33

Korenitka (pronounced [kɔɾɛˈniːtka]) is a small village in the Municipality of Trebnje in eastern Slovenia. The area is part of the historical region of Lower Carniola. The municipality is now included in the Southeast Slovenia Statistical Region.

The local church is dedicated to Saint Anne and belongs to the Parish of Šentlovrenc. It is a Gothic building, expanded in the 18th century when a chapel dedicated to the Prophet Elijah was added.
