= Češnjevek, Trebnje =

Češnjevek
- Location in Slovenia
- Coordinates: 45°54′23.04″N 15°3′44.55″E
- Country: Slovenia
- Traditional region: Lower Carniola
- Statistical region: Southeast Slovenia
- Municipality: Trebnje

Area
  - Total: 1.37 km^{2} (0.53 sq mi)
- Elevation: 302.2 m (991 ft)

Population (2002)
  - Total: 88

Češnjevek (pronounced [ˈtʃeːʃnjɛʋək]) is a settlement in the Municipality of Trebnje in eastern Slovenia. The area is part of the traditional region of Lower Carniola and is now included in the Southeast Slovenia Statistical Region.
