= Belšinja Vas =

- Location in Slovenia
- Coordinates: 45°54′28.29″N 14°58′50.37″E
- Country: Slovenia
- Traditional region: Lower Carniola
- Statistical region: Southeast Slovenia
- Municipality: Trebnje

Area
  - Total: 1.27 km^{2} (0.49 sq mi)
- Elevation: 309 m (1,014 ft)

Population (2002)
  - Total: 46

Belšinja Vas (pronounced [bɛu̯ˈʃiːnja ˈʋaːs]; Slovene: Belšinja vas) is a small village in the Municipality of Trebnje in eastern Slovenia. It lies on the right bank of the Temenica River west of Trebnje. The area is part of the traditional region of Lower Carniola. The municipality is now included in the Southeast Slovenia Statistical Region.

== Name ==
Belšinja Vas was attested in historical documents as Velestoͤrf in 1383, Willissendorff in 1433, and Valschen in 1463, among other spellings.
