= Dolenji Vrh =

- Location in Slovenia
- Coordinates: 45°52′37.83″N 15°0′34.28″E
- Country: Slovenia
- Traditional region: Lower Carniola
- Statistical region: Southeast Slovenia
- Municipality: Trebnje

Area
  - Total: 0.63 km^{2} (0.24 sq mi)
- Elevation: 467.7 m (1,534 ft)

Population (2002)
  - Total: 36

Dolenji Vrh (pronounced [dɔˈleːnji ˈʋəɾx]) is a small settlement in the hills south of Trebnje in eastern Slovenia. The area is part of the traditional region of Lower Carniola. The entire Municipality of Trebnje is now included in the Southeast Slovenia Statistical Region.
