= Podlisec =

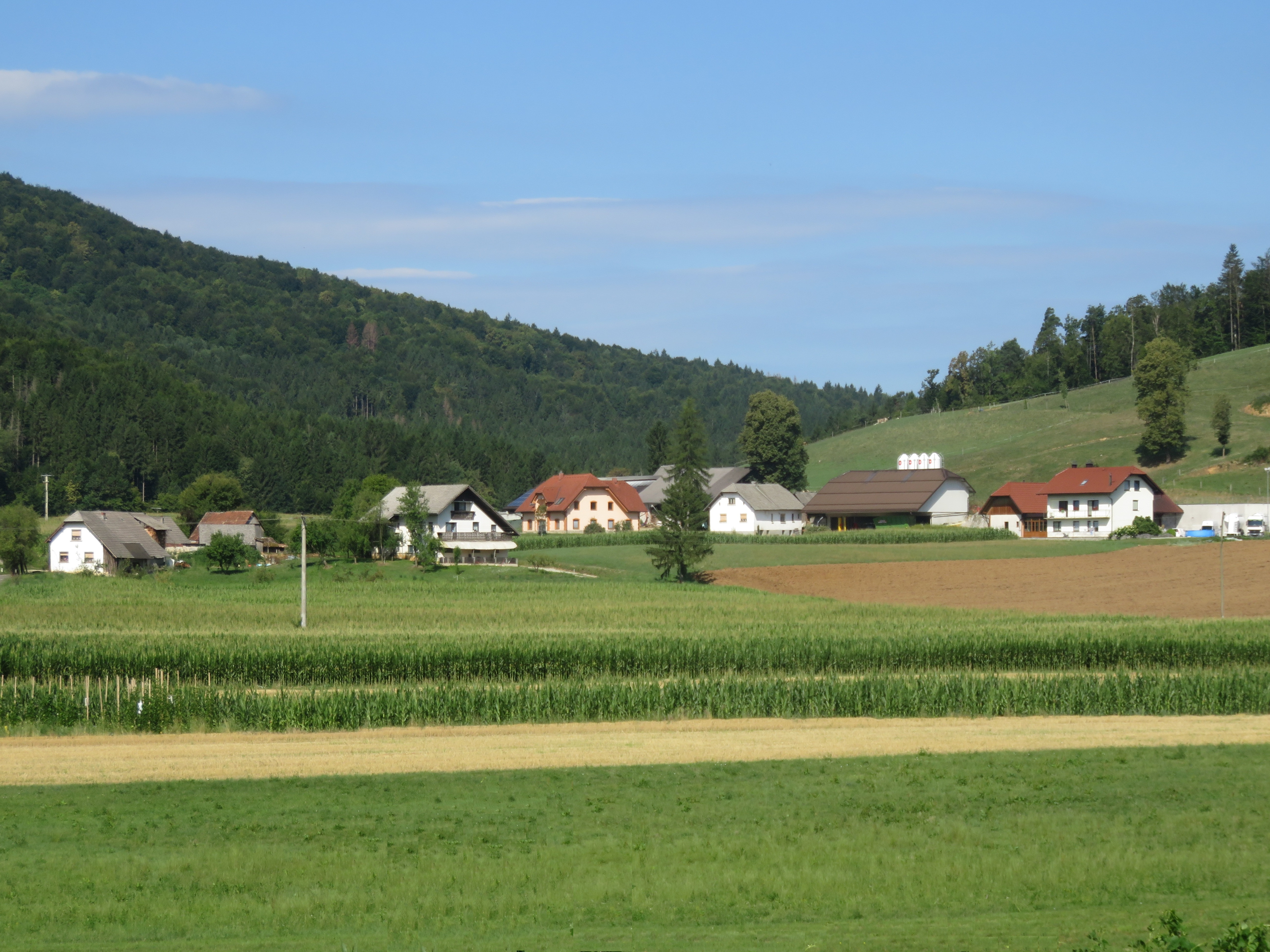

- Location in Slovenia
- Coordinates: 45°52′41.38″N 14°58′12.37″E
- Country: Slovenia
- Traditional region: Lower Carniola
- Statistical region: Southeast Slovenia
- Municipality: Trebnje

Area
  - Total: 2.65 km^{2} (1.02 sq mi)
- Elevation: 245.7 m (806 ft)

Population (2002)
  - Total: 24

Podlisec (pronounced [pɔˈdliːsəts]) is a small settlement just west of Dobrnič in the Municipality of Trebnje in eastern Slovenia. It lies on the northeastern slope of Lisec Hill on the regional road to Trebnje. The area is part of the historical region of Lower Carniola. The municipality is now included in the Southeast Slovenia Statistical Region.

The local church built on Lisec Hill south of the settlement, is dedicated to the Holy Cross and belongs to the Parish of Dobrnič. It was first mentioned in written documents dating to 1526, but contains fragments of frescos dated to the early 15th century. The sanctuary and belfry date to the 17th century and in the 19th century a porch was added.
