= Odrga =

- Location in Slovenia
- Coordinates: 45°54′12.09″N 15°0′48.69″E
- Country: Slovenia
- Traditional region: Lower Carniola
- Statistical region: Southeast Slovenia
- Municipality: Trebnje

Area
  - Total: 0.98 km^{2} (0.38 sq mi)
- Elevation: 302.5 m (992 ft)

Population (2002)
  - Total: 57

Odrga (pronounced [ˈoːdəɾɡa]) is a small settlement in the Municipality of Trebnje in eastern Slovenia. It lies on the right bank of the Temenica River opposite Trebnje. The area is part of the historical region of Lower Carniola. The municipality is now included in the Southeast Slovenia Statistical Region.
