= Krušni Vrh =

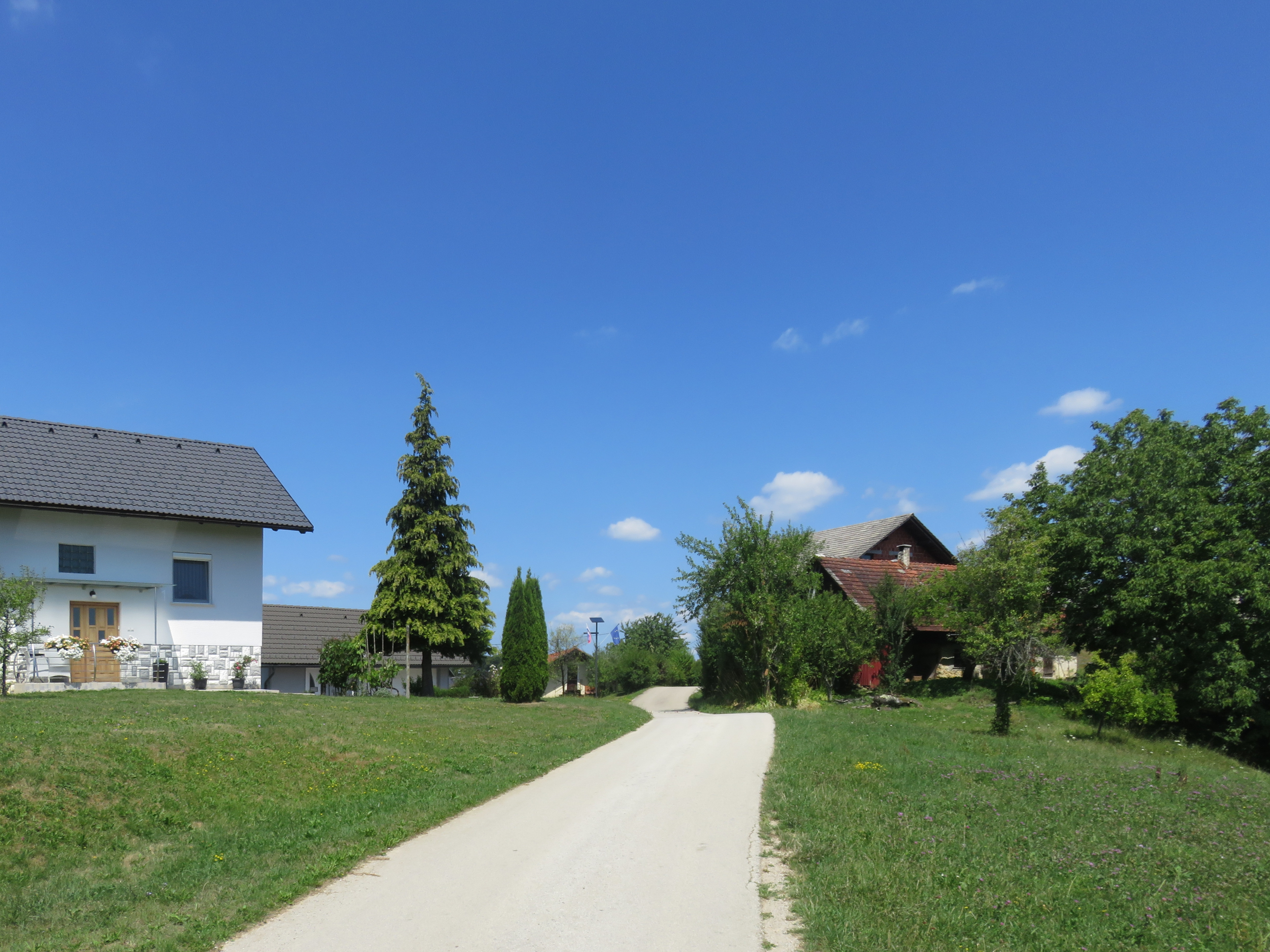

- Location in Slovenia
- Coordinates: 45°54′24.02″N 14°56′11.21″E
- Country: Slovenia
- Traditional region: Lower Carniola
- Statistical region: Southeast Slovenia
- Municipality: Trebnje

Area
  - Total: 1.18 km^{2} (0.46 sq mi)
- Elevation: 388.6 m (1,275 ft)

Population (2002)
  - Total: 25

Krušni Vrh (pronounced [ˈkɾuːʃni ˈʋəɾx]) is a small settlement in the hills west of Trebnje in the Lower Carniola region of Slovenia. The Municipality of Trebnje is included in the Southeast Slovenia Statistical Region.
