= Gorenji Podboršt pri Veliki Loki =

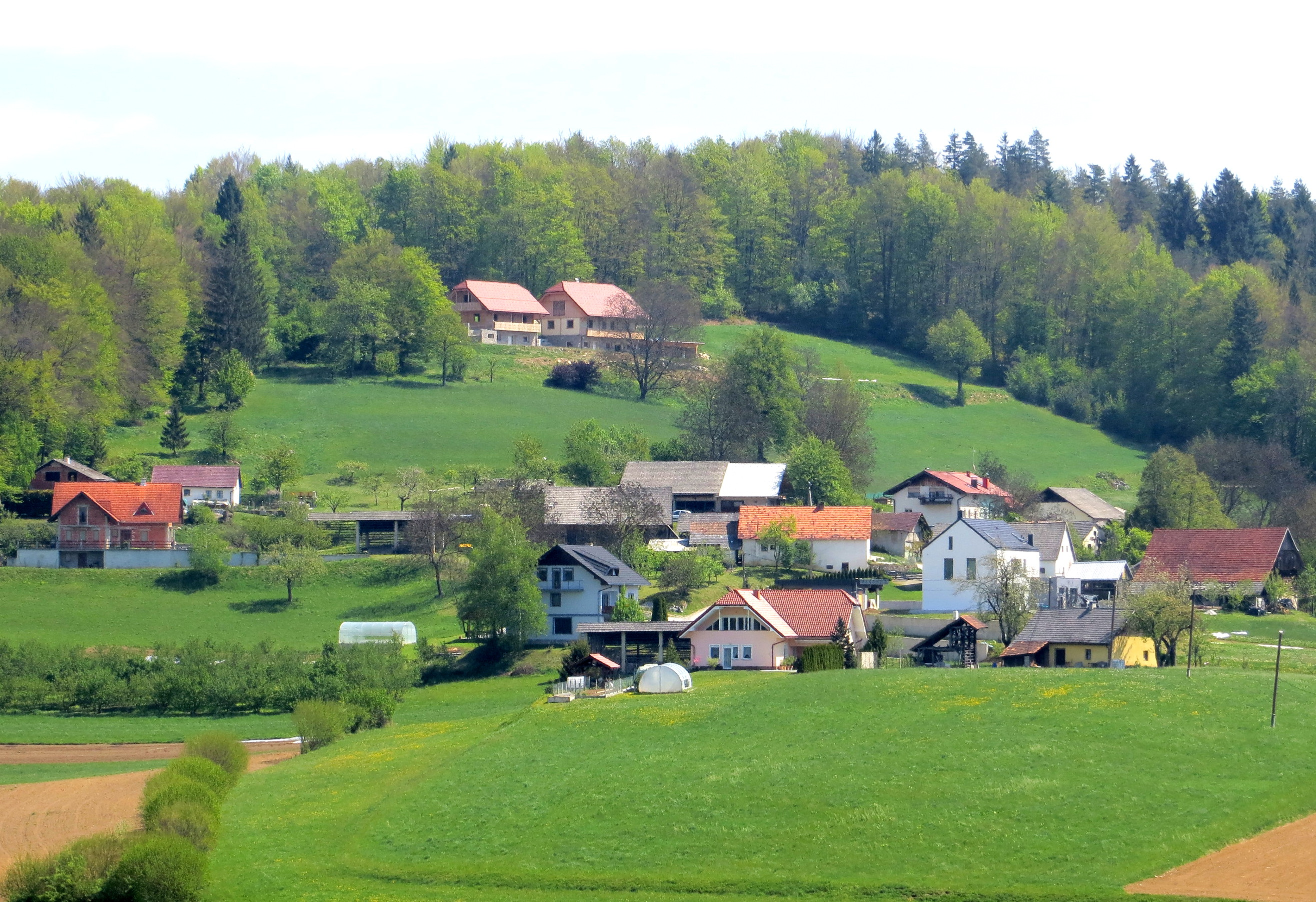

- Location in Slovenia
- Coordinates: 45°56′38.51″N 14°59′3.33″E
- Country: Slovenia
- Traditional region: Lower Carniola
- Statistical region: Southeast Slovenia
- Municipality: Trebnje

Area
  - Total: 0.62 km^{2} (0.24 sq mi)
- Elevation: 326 m (1,070 ft)

Population (2002)
  - Total: 16

Gorenji Podboršt pri Veliki Loki (pronounced [ɡɔˈɾeːnji pɔdˈbɔɾʃt pɾi ˈʋeːliki ˈloːki]) is a small settlement in the hills northeast of Velika Loka in the Municipality of Trebnje in eastern Slovenia. The area is part of the historical region of Lower Carniola. The municipality is now included in the Southeast Slovenia Statistical Region.

== Name ==
The name of the settlement was changed from Gorenji Podboršt to Gorenji Podboršt pri Veliki Loki in 1953.
