= Mala Ševnica =

- Location in Slovenia
- Coordinates: 45°56′45.96″N 15°0′15.3″E
- Country: Slovenia
- Traditional region: Lower Carniola
- Statistical region: Southeast Slovenia
- Municipality: Trebnje

Area
  - Total: 1.01 km^{2} (0.39 sq mi)
- Elevation: 300.1 m (985 ft)

Population (2002)
  - Total: 19

Mala Ševnica (pronounced [ˈmaːla ˈʃeːu̯nitsa]) is a small dispersed settlement north of Račje Selo in the Municipality of Trebnje in Slovenia. The area is part of the traditional region of Lower Carniola and is now included in the Southeast Slovenia Statistical Region.
