= Žabjek =

- Location in Slovenia
- Coordinates: 45°56′41.07″N 14°57′26.75″E
- Country: Slovenia
- Traditional region: Lower Carniola
- Statistical region: Southeast Slovenia
- Municipality: Trebnje

Area
  - Total: 0.41 km^{2} (0.16 sq mi)
- Elevation: 297.9 m (977 ft)

Population (2002)
  - Total: 22

Žabjek (pronounced [ˈʒaːbjɛk]) is a small settlement in the Municipality of Trebnje in eastern Slovenia. It lies north of Velika Loka. The area is part of the traditional region of Lower Carniola. The municipality is now included in the Southeast Slovenia Statistical Region.
