= Dobravica pri Velikem Gabru =

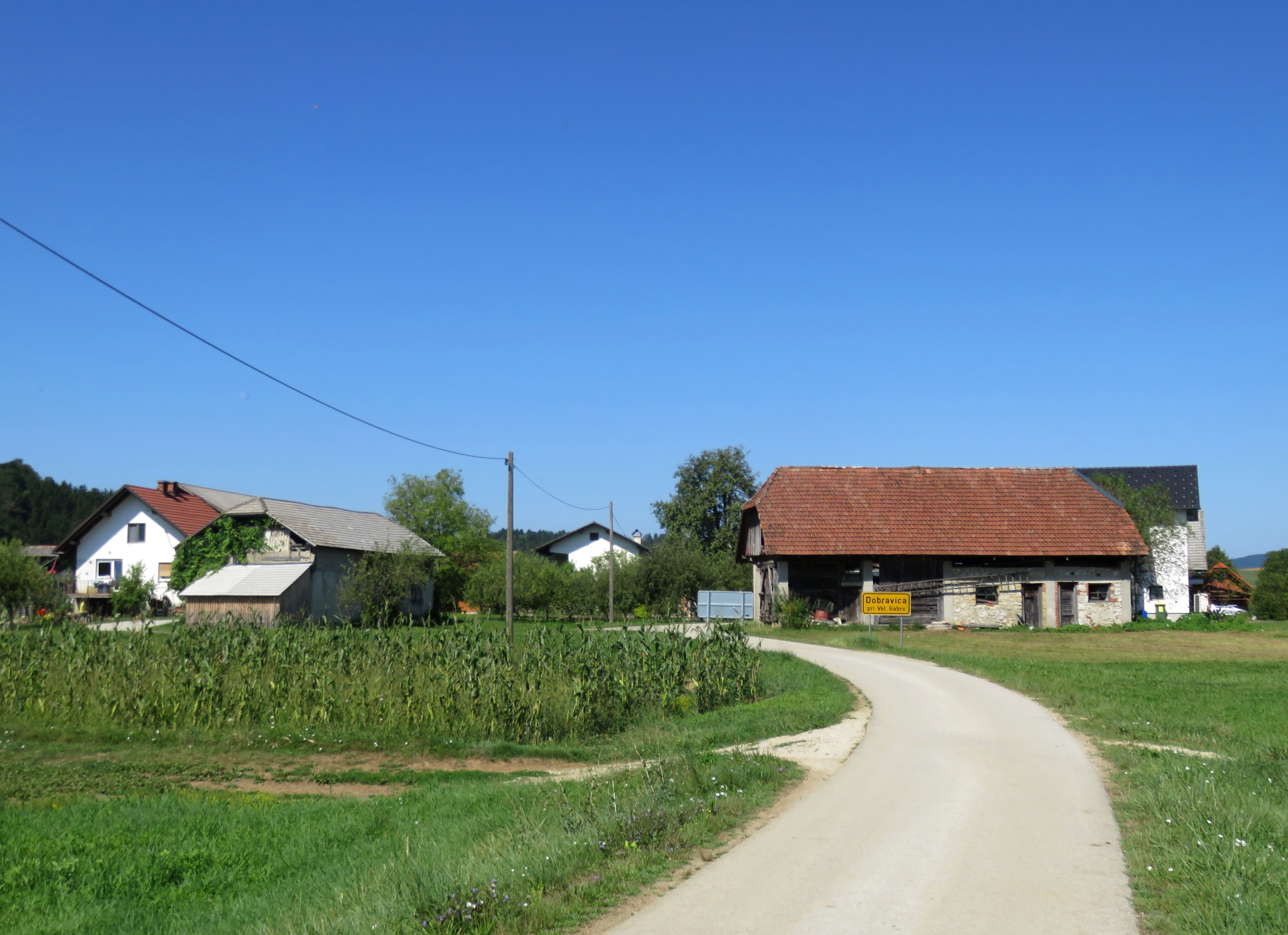

- Location in Slovenia
- Coordinates: 45°55′21.53″N 14°53′1.32″E
- Country: Slovenia
- Traditional region: Lower Carniola
- Statistical region: Southeast Slovenia
- Municipality: Trebnje

Area
  - Total: 0.54 km^{2} (0.21 sq mi)
- Elevation: 304 m (997 ft)

Population (2002)
  - Total: 16

Dobravica pri Velikem Gabru (pronounced [dɔˈbɾaːʋitsa pɾi ˈʋeːlikɛm ˈɡaːbɾu]; in older sources also Dobrovica) is a small settlement in the Municipality of Trebnje in eastern Slovenia. It lies southwest of Veliki Gaber, just south of the Slovenian A2 motorway. The area is part of the traditional region of Lower Carniola. The municipality is now included in the Southeast Slovenia Statistical Region.

== Name ==
The name of the settlement was changed from Dobravica to Dobravica pri Velikem Gabru in 1953.
