= Iglenik pri Veliki Loki =

- Location in Slovenia
- Coordinates: 45°56′1.9″N 14°59′9.83″E
- Country: Slovenia
- Traditional region: Lower Carniola
- Statistical region: Southeast Slovenia
- Municipality: Trebnje

Area
  - Total: 1.16 km^{2} (0.45 sq mi)
- Elevation: 324.2 m (1,064 ft)

Population (2002)
  - Total: 52

Iglenik pri Veliki Loki (pronounced [iˈɡleːnik pɾi ˈʋeːliki ˈloːki]) is a small village east of Velika Loka in the Municipality of Trebnje in eastern Slovenia. The municipality is included in the Southeast Slovenia Statistical Region. The entire area is part of the traditional region of Lower Carniola.

== Name ==
The name of the settlement was changed from Iglenik to Iglenik pri Veliki Loki in 1953.
