= Breza, Trebnje =

Breza
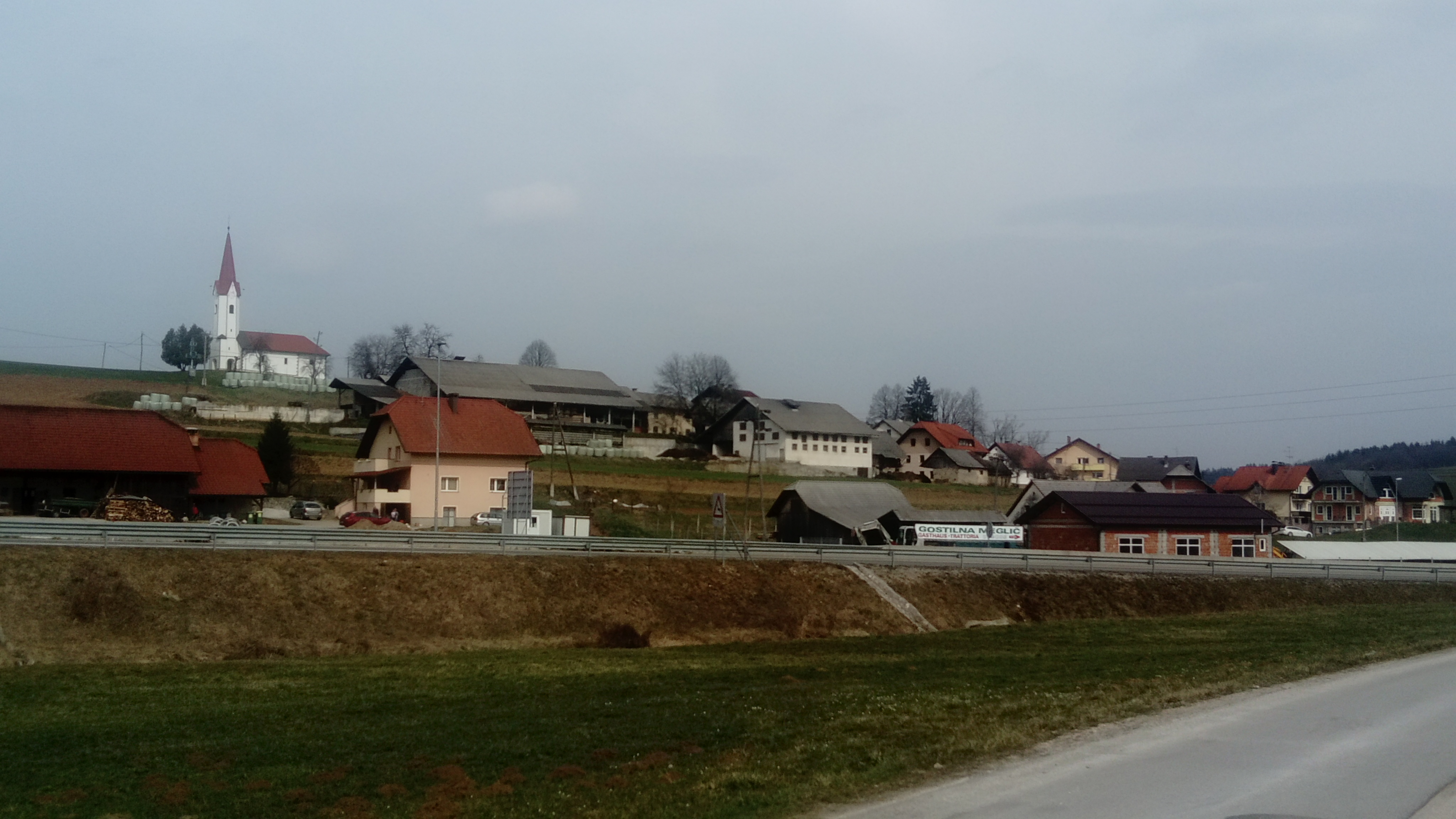

- Location in Slovenia
- Coordinates: 45°54′48.69″N 14°58′40.61″E
- Country: Slovenia
- Traditional region: Lower Carniola
- Statistical region: Southeast Slovenia
- Municipality: Trebnje

Area
  - Total: 0.52 km^{2} (0.20 sq mi)
- Elevation: 288.5 m (947 ft)

Population (2002)
  - Total: 83

Breza (pronounced [ˈbɾeːza]) is a small settlement in the Municipality of Trebnje in eastern Slovenia. The area is part of the traditional region of Lower Carniola. The municipality is now included in the Southeast Slovenia Statistical Region.

== Name ==
Breza was attested in written sources as Pirk between 1395 and 1396, and Pirkch in 1436, among other spellings.

== Church ==
The local church is dedicated to John the Baptist and belongs to the Parish of Trebnje. It is a 15th-century building, although the earliest written reference dates to 1581. The belfry dates to the 17th century.
