= Gorenji Vrh pri Dobrniču =

- Location in Slovenia
- Coordinates: 45°52′42.69″N 15°0′59.79″E
- Country: Slovenia
- Traditional region: Lower Carniola
- Statistical region: Southeast Slovenia
- Municipality: Trebnje

Area
  - Total: 0.55 km^{2} (0.21 sq mi)
- Elevation: 492 m (1,614 ft)

Population (2002)
  - Total: 37

Gorenji Vrh pri Dobrniču (pronounced [ɡɔˈɾeːnji ˈʋəɾx pɾi ˈdoːbəɾnitʃu]) is a small village in the Municipality of Trebnje in eastern Slovenia. The area is part of the historical region of Lower Carniola. The municipality is now included in the Southeast Slovenia Statistical Region. The nucleated village was built around a small pond in the 18th century and is included on the list of cultural monuments published by the Ministry of Culture of the Republic of Slovenia.

== Name ==
The name of the settlement was changed from Gorenji Vrh to Gorenji Vrh pri Dobrniču in 1953.
