= Velika Ševnica =

- Location in Slovenia
- Coordinates: 45°56′35.59″N 15°0′10.65″E
- Country: Slovenia
- Traditional region: Lower Carniola
- Statistical region: Southeast Slovenia
- Municipality: Trebnje

Area
  - Total: 1.17 km^{2} (0.45 sq mi)
- Elevation: 304.5 m (999 ft)

Population (2002)
  - Total: 47

Velika Ševnica (pronounced [ˈʋeːlika ˈʃeːu̯nitsa]) is a settlement in the Municipality of Trebnje in eastern Slovenia. It lies north of Trebnje on the road from Račje Selo to Čatež. The area is part of the historical region of Lower Carniola. The municipality is now included in the Southeast Slovenia Statistical Region.
