= Repče, Trebnje =

Repče
- Location in Slovenia
- Coordinates: 45°53′29.66″N 15°0′51.46″E
- Country: Slovenia
- Traditional region: Lower Carniola
- Statistical region: Southeast Slovenia
- Municipality: Trebnje

Area
  - Total: 1.29 km^{2} (0.50 sq mi)
- Elevation: 512.9 m (1,683 ft)

Population (2002)
  - Total: 75

Repče (pronounced [ˈɾeːptʃɛ]) is a small village in the hills south of Trebnje in Lower Carniola in eastern Slovenia. The Municipality of Trebnje is part of the Southeast Slovenia Statistical Region.
