= Kriška Reber =

- Location in Slovenia
- Coordinates: 45°57′18.03″N 14°59′55.79″E
- Country: Slovenia
- Traditional region: Lower Carniola
- Statistical region: Southeast Slovenia
- Municipality: Trebnje

Area
  - Total: 0.48 km^{2} (0.19 sq mi)
- Elevation: 359.5 m (1,179 ft)

Population (2002)
  - Total: 28

Kriška Reber (pronounced [ˈkɾiːʃka ˈɾeːbəɾ]) is a small settlement in the Municipality of Trebnje in eastern Slovenia. Traditionally the Trebnje area was part of Lower Carniola and is now included in the Southeast Slovenia Statistical Region.
