= Dečja Vas, Trebnje =

Dečja Vas
- Location in Slovenia
- Coordinates: 45°52′43.63″N 15°2′28.37″E
- Country: Slovenia
- Traditional region: Lower Carniola
- Statistical region: Southeast Slovenia
- Municipality: Trebnje

Area
  - Total: 3.06 km^{2} (1.18 sq mi)
- Elevation: 344.2 m (1,129 ft)

Population (2002)
  - Total: 88

Dečja Vas (pronounced [ˈdeːtʃja ˈʋaːs]; Slovene: Dečja vas) is a village in the hills southeast of Trebnje in eastern Slovenia. The area is part of the traditional region of Lower Carniola. The Municipality of Trebnje is now included in the Southeast Slovenia Statistical Region.

The local church is dedicated to Saint Michael and belongs to the Parish of Trebnje. It was first mentioned in written documents dating to 1526, but was extensively rebuilt in the mid-19th century.
