= Roženpelj =

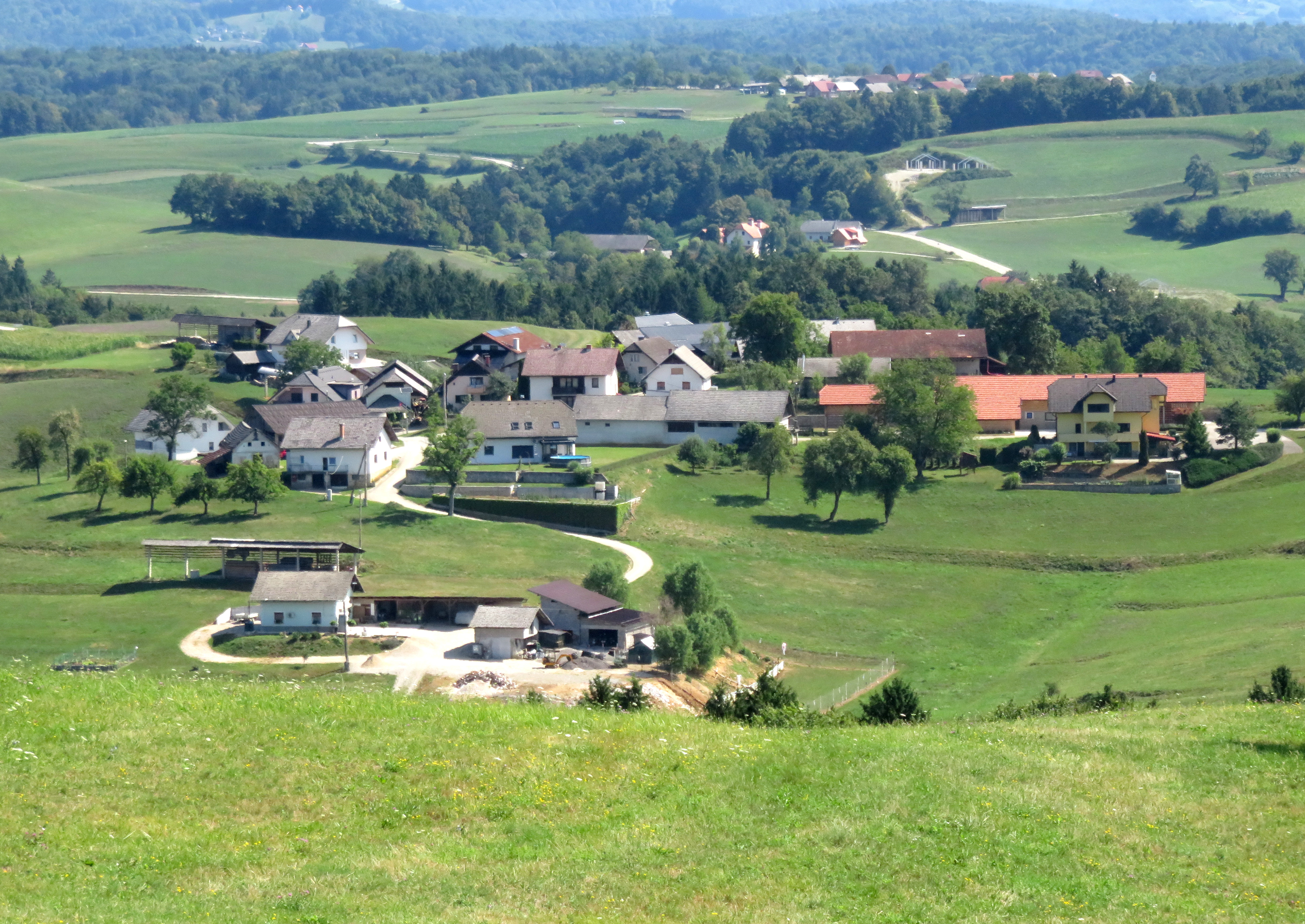

- Location in Slovenia
- Coordinates: 45°53′52.6″N 14°56′18.67″E
- Country: Slovenia
- Traditional region: Lower Carniola
- Statistical region: Southeast Slovenia
- Municipality: Trebnje

Area
  - Total: 0.63 km^{2} (0.24 sq mi)
- Elevation: 342.4 m (1,123 ft)

Population (2002)
  - Total: 47

Roženpelj (pronounced [ˈɾoːʒəmpəl]) is a small settlement west of Knežja Vas in the Municipality of Trebnje in eastern Slovenia. The area is part of Lower Carniola and is included in the Southeast Slovenia Statistical Region.
