= Zagorica pri Dobrniču =

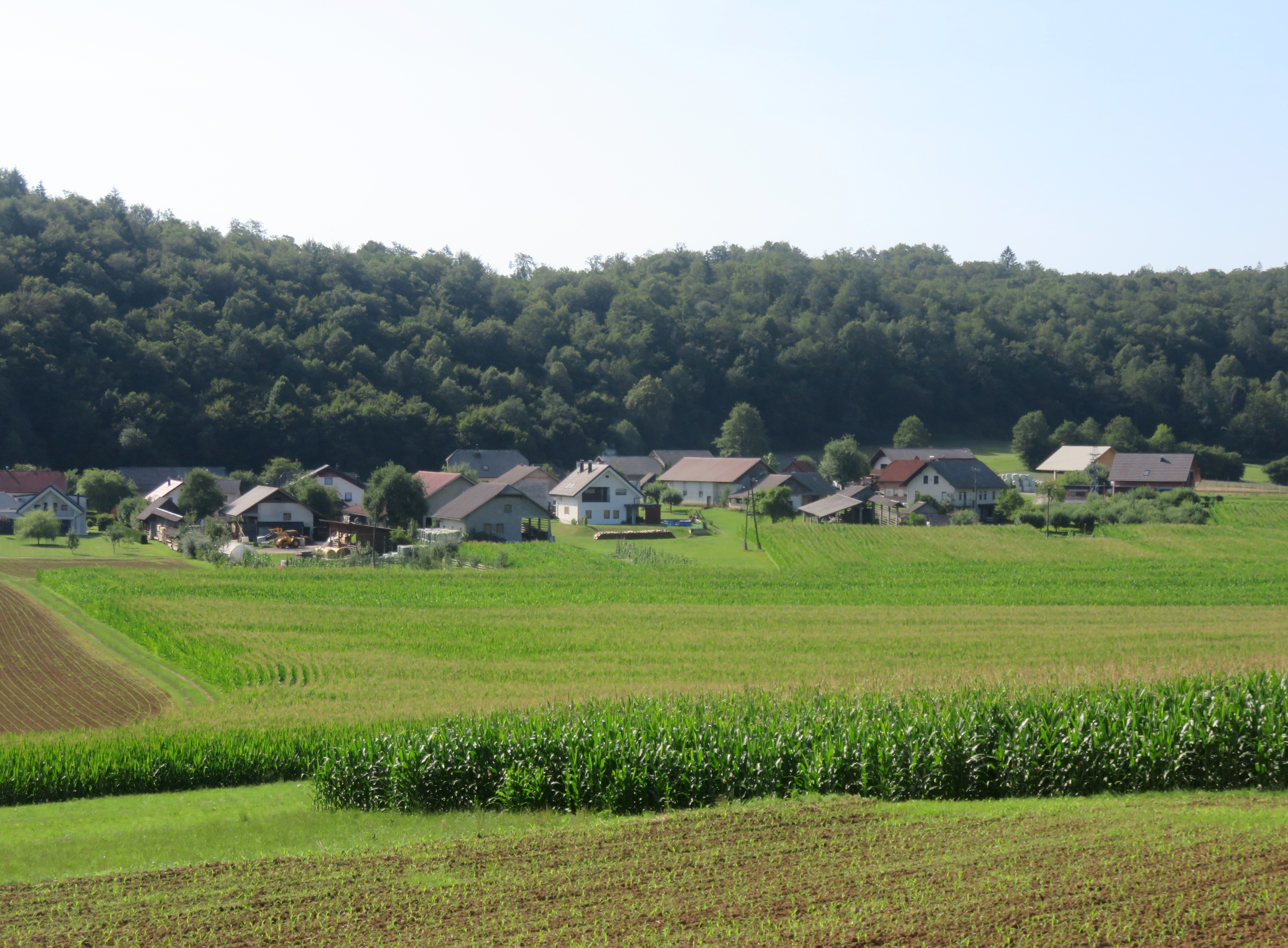

- Location in Slovenia
- Coordinates: 45°51′48.26″N 14°58′26.31″E
- Country: Slovenia
- Traditional region: Lower Carniola
- Statistical region: Southeast Slovenia
- Municipality: Trebnje

Area
  - Total: 0.97 km^{2} (0.37 sq mi)
- Elevation: 241.7 m (793 ft)

Population (2002)
  - Total: 57

Zagorica pri Dobrniču (pronounced [zaɡɔˈɾiːtsa pɾi ˈdoːbəɾnitʃu]) is a small settlement in the Municipality of Trebnje in eastern Slovenia. It lies south of Dobrnič below the eastern slopes of Mount Lisec (Slovene: Liška gora). The area is part of the historical region of Lower Carniola. The municipality is now included in the Southeast Slovenia Statistical Region.

== Name ==
The name of the settlement was changed from Zagorica to Zagorica pri Dobrniču in 1953.
