= Gorenje Ponikve =

- Location in Slovenia
- Coordinates: 45°53′48.42″N 15°2′26.1″E
- Country: Slovenia
- Traditional region: Lower Carniola
- Statistical region: Southeast Slovenia
- Municipality: Trebnje

Area
  - Total: 1.91 km^{2} (0.74 sq mi)
- Elevation: 274.7 m (901 ft)

Population (2002)
  - Total: 108

Gorenje Ponikve (pronounced [ɡɔˈɾeːnjɛ pɔˈniːkʋɛ]) is a small village in the Municipality of Trebnje in eastern Slovenia. It lies just off the road leading southeast out of Trebnje towards Novo Mesto through Mirna Peč. The area is part of the historical region of Lower Carniola. The municipality is now included in the Southeast Slovenia Statistical Region.
