= Male Dole pri Stehanji Vasi =

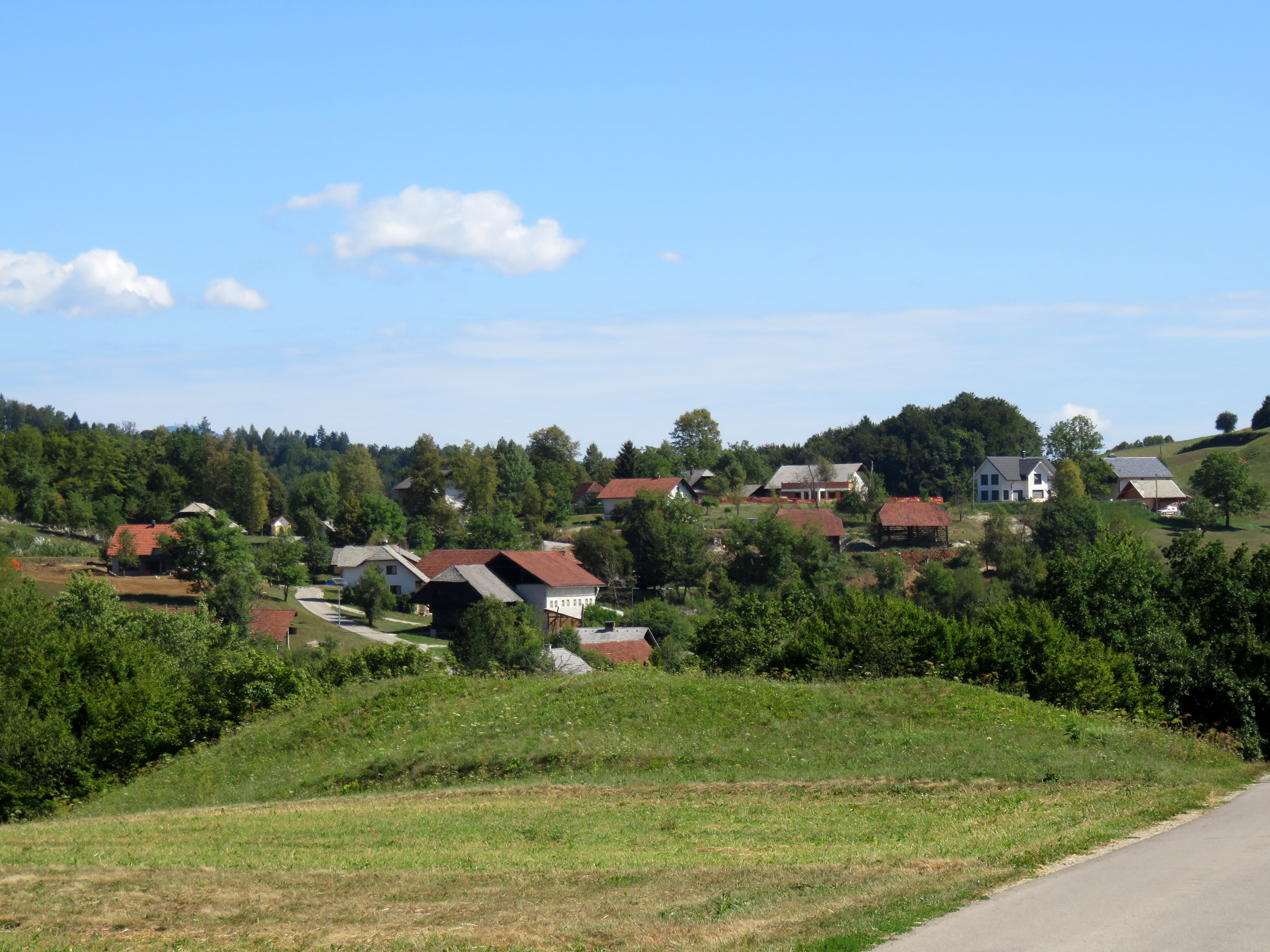

- Location in Slovenia
- Coordinates: 45°54′45.35″N 14°54′48.12″E
- Country: Slovenia
- Traditional region: Lower Carniola
- Statistical region: Southeast Slovenia
- Municipality: Trebnje

Area
  - Total: 1.21 km^{2} (0.47 sq mi)
- Elevation: 360.4 m (1,182 ft)

Population (2002)
  - Total: 46

Male Dole pri Stehanji Vasi (pronounced [ˈmaːle ˈdoːlɛ pɾi stɛˈxaːnji ˈʋaːsi]; Slovene: Male Dole pri Stehanji vasi, German: Kleindule) is a small settlement just west of Stehanja Vas in the Municipality of Trebnje in eastern Slovenia. The area is part of the historical region of Lower Carniola. The municipality is now included in the Southeast Slovenia Statistical Region.

== Name ==
The name of the settlement was changed from Male Dole to Male Dole pri Stehanji vasi in 1953. In the past the German name was Kleindule.
