= Gorenja Vas, Trebnje =

Gorenja Vas
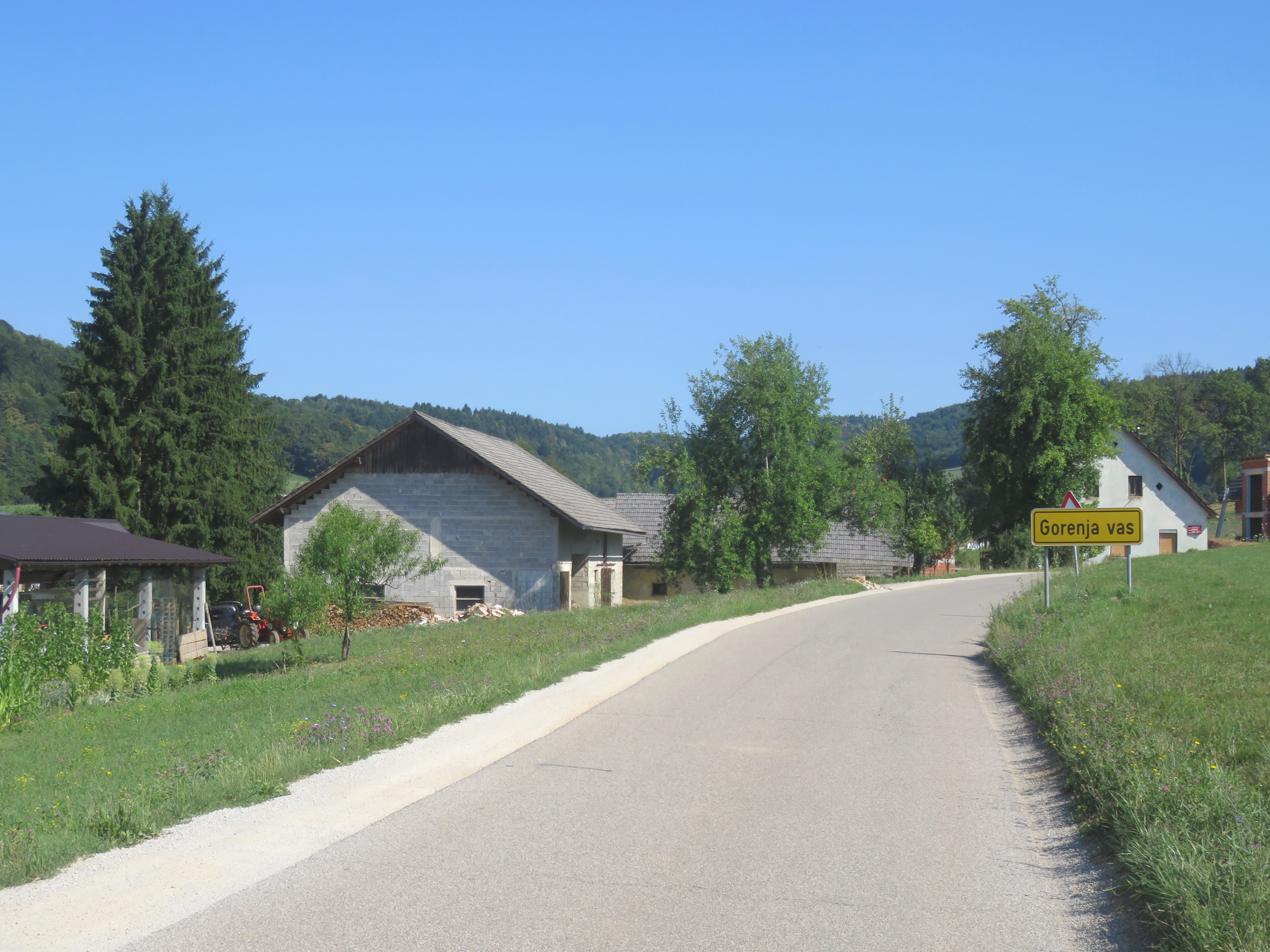

- Location in Slovenia
- Coordinates: 45°52′45.6″N 14°58′34.63″E
- Country: Slovenia
- Traditional region: Lower Carniola
- Statistical region: Southeast Slovenia
- Municipality: Trebnje

Area
  - Total: 0.36 km^{2} (0.14 sq mi)
- Elevation: 239.1 m (784 ft)

Population (2002)
  - Total: 19

Gorenja Vas (pronounced [ɡɔˈɾeːnja ˈʋaːs]; Slovene: Gorenja vas) is a small settlement just north of Dobrnič in the Municipality of Trebnje in eastern Slovenia. The area is part of the historical region of Lower Carniola. The municipality is now included in the Southeast Slovenia Statistical Region.
