= Dol pri Trebnjem =

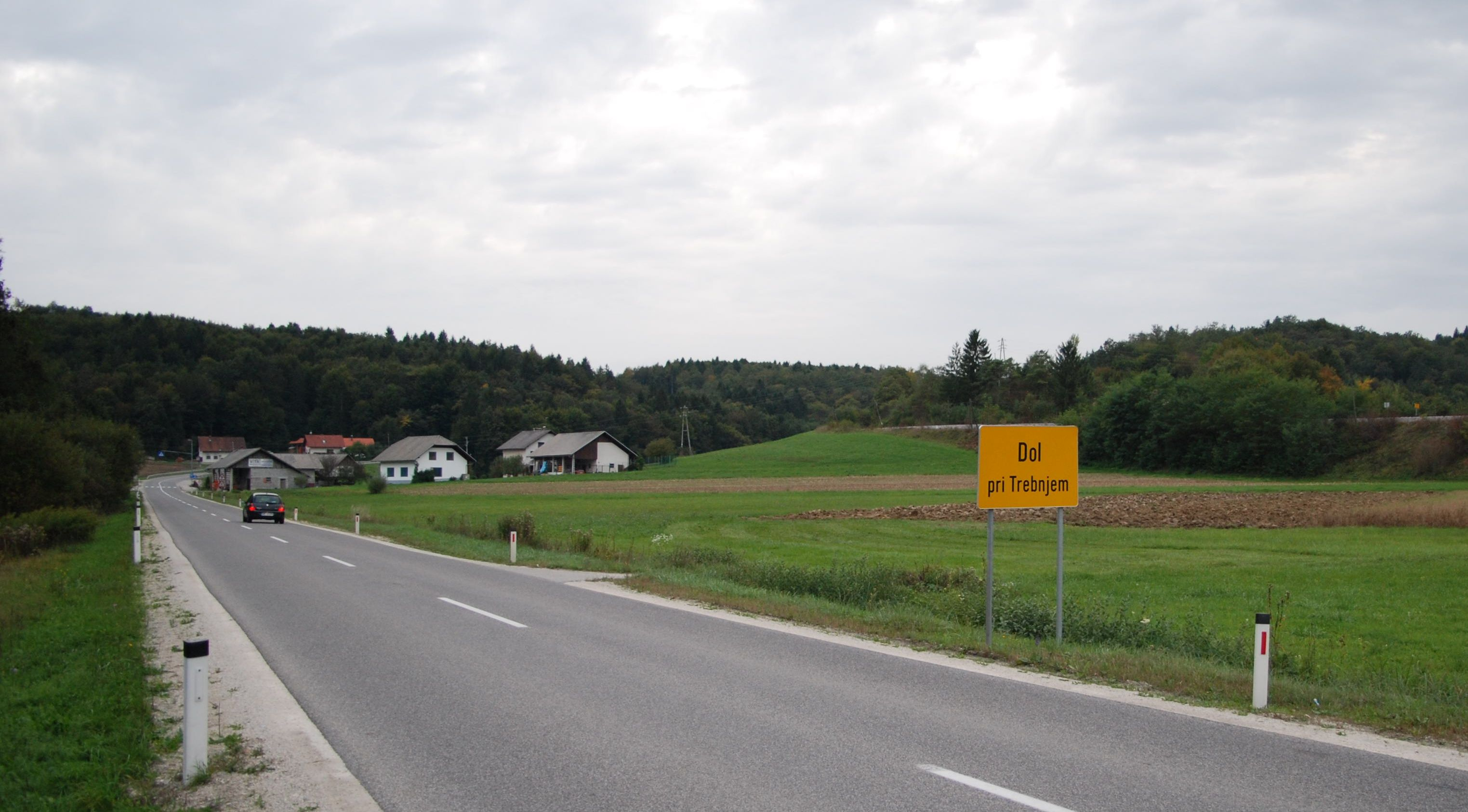

- Location in Slovenia
- Coordinates: 45°55′34.68″N 15°1′57.87″E
- Country: Slovenia
- Traditional region: Lower Carniola
- Statistical region: Southeast Slovenia
- Municipality: Trebnje

Area
  - Total: 1.39 km^{2} (0.54 sq mi)
- Elevation: 275 m (902 ft)

Population (2002)
  - Total: 72

Dol pri Trebnjem (pronounced [ˈdoːu̯ pɾi ˈtɾeːbnjɛm]) is a small settlement in the Municipality of Trebnje in eastern Slovenia. It lies just north of Trebnje itself, off the regional road leading to Mirna. The area is part of the historical region of Lower Carniola. The municipality is now included in the Southeast Slovenia Statistical Region.

== Name ==
The name of the settlement was changed from Dol to Dol pri Trebnjem in 1955.
