= Rdeči Kal, Trebnje =

Rdeči Kal
- Location in Slovenia
- Coordinates: 45°51′54.1″N 15°0′50.5″E
- Country: Slovenia
- Traditional region: Lower Carniola
- Statistical region: Southeast Slovenia
- Municipality: Trebnje

Area
  - Total: 6.31 km^{2} (2.44 sq mi)
- Elevation: 296.2 m (972 ft)

Population (2002)
  - Total: 90

Rdeči Kal (pronounced [əɾˈdeːtʃi ˈkaːu̯]) is a settlement in the hills to the southeast of Dobrnič in the Municipality of Trebnje in eastern Slovenia. It lies below the northern slope of Sharp Peak (Slovene: Ostri vrh, 523 m). The area is part of the historical region of Lower Carniola. The municipality is now included in the Southeast Slovenia Statistical Region.
