= Gorica na Medvedjeku =

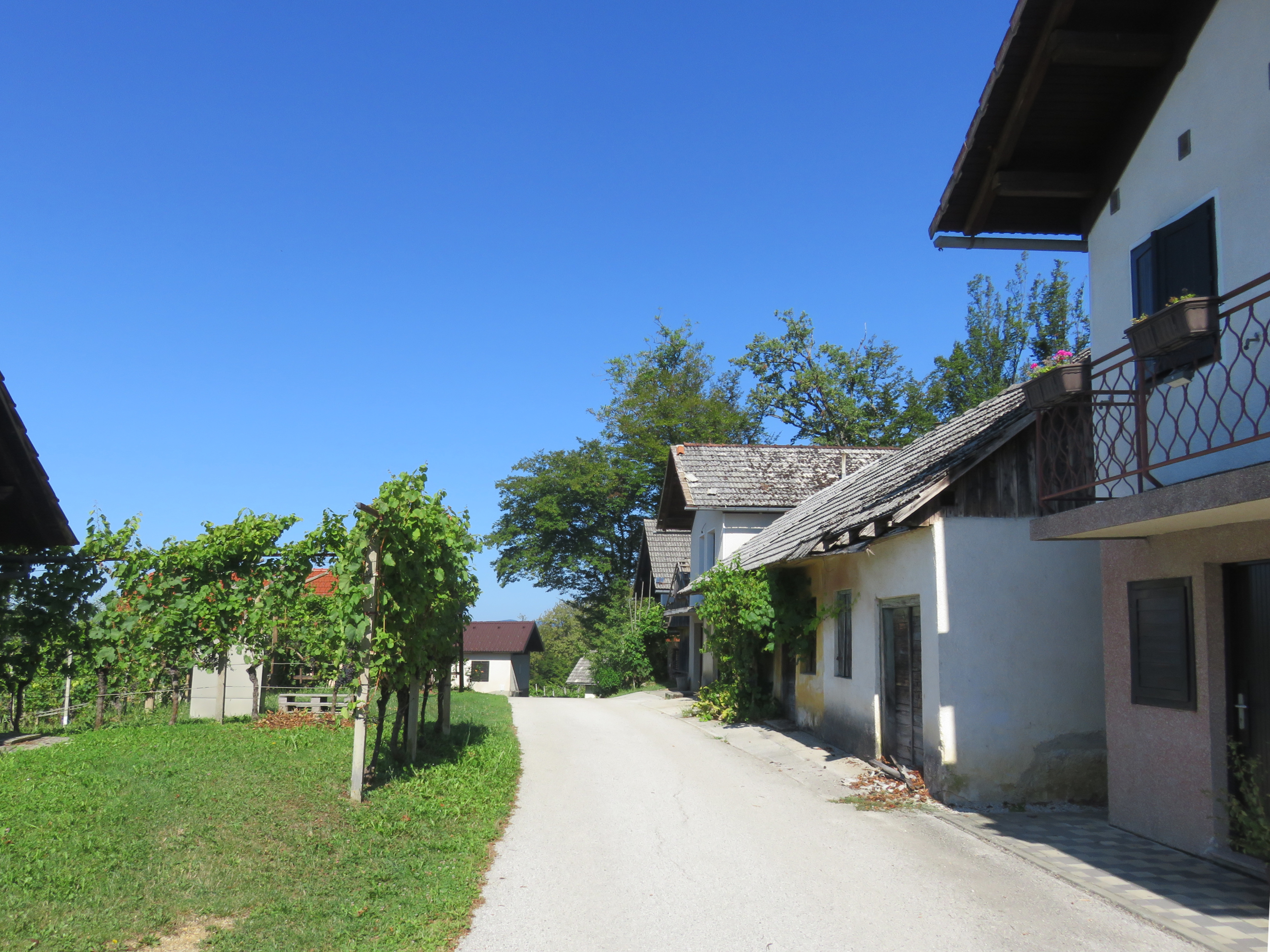

- Location in Slovenia
- Coordinates: 45°55′40.84″N 14°56′2.16″E
- Country: Slovenia
- Traditional region: Lower Carniola
- Statistical region: Southeast Slovenia
- Municipality: Trebnje

Area
  - Total: 0.6 km^{2} (0.23 sq mi)

Population
  - Total: 1
  - Density: 2/km^{2} (5.2/sq mi)

Gorica na Medvedjeku (pronounced [ɡɔˈɾiːtsa na mɛˈdʋeːdjɛku]) is a small village in the Municipality of Trebnje in eastern Slovenia. The area is part of the historical region of Lower Carniola. The municipality is now included in the Southeast Slovenia Statistical Region.

== History ==
Gorica na Medvedjeku was established as an independent settlement in 2013, when it was separated from Martinja Vas.
