= Grm, Trebnje =

Grm
- Location in Slovenia
- Coordinates: 45°53′48.73″N 15°3′5.07″E
- Country: Slovenia
- Traditional region: Lower Carniola
- Statistical region: Southeast Slovenia
- Municipality: Trebnje

Area
  - Total: 0.78 km^{2} (0.30 sq mi)
- Elevation: 280.3 m (920 ft)

Population (2002)
  - Total: 96

Grm (pronounced [ˈɡəɾm]) is a small village in the Municipality of Trebnje in eastern Slovenia. The area is part of the historical region of Lower Carniola. The municipality is now included in the Southeast Slovenia Statistical Region.

The local church is dedicated to Saint Margaret (Slovene: sveta Marjeta) and belongs to the Parish of Trebnje. It is a 15th-century church with major 17th-century remodelling in the Baroque style.
