= Dolenje Medvedje Selo =

- Location in Slovenia
- Coordinates: 45°54′47.07″N 15°1′24.89″E
- Country: Slovenia
- Traditional region: Lower Carniola
- Statistical region: Southeast Slovenia
- Municipality: Trebnje

Area
  - Total: 0.29 km^{2} (0.11 sq mi)
- Elevation: 275 m (902 ft)

Population (2002)
  - Total: 37

Dolenje Medvedje Selo (pronounced [dɔˈleːnjɛ mɛˈdʋeːdjɛ ˈsɛːlɔ]; Slovene: Dolenje Medvedje selo) is a small settlement on the northern outskirts of Trebnje in eastern Slovenia. The area is part of the historical region of Lower Carniola and the Municipality of Trebnje is now included in the Southeast Slovenia Statistical Region.
