= Grič pri Trebnjem =

- Location in Slovenia
- Coordinates: 45°54′26.66″N 14°58′10.93″E
- Country: Slovenia
- Traditional region: Lower Carniola
- Statistical region: Southeast Slovenia
- Municipality: Trebnje

Area
  - Total: 0.8 km^{2} (0.31 sq mi)
- Elevation: 320.8 m (1,052 ft)

Population (2002)
  - Total: 10

Grič pri Trebnjem (pronounced [ˈɡɾiːtʃ pɾi ˈtɾeːbnjɛm]) is a small settlement west of Trebnje in eastern Slovenia. It lies below the northern slopes of Fat Hill (Slovene: Debeli hrib, 420 m). The Municipality of Trebnje is part of the historical region of Lower Carniola and is now included in the Southeast Slovenia Statistical Region.

== Name ==
The name of the settlement was changed from Grič to Grič pri Trebnjem in 1955.
