= Artmanja Vas =

- Location in Slovenia
- Coordinates: 45°52′12.24″N 14°59′12.67″E
- Country: Slovenia
- Traditional region: Lower Carniola
- Statistical region: Southeast Slovenia
- Municipality: Trebnje

Area
  - Total: 0.99 km^{2} (0.38 sq mi)
- Elevation: 231.9 m (761 ft)

Population (2002)
  - Total: 27

Artmanja Vas (pronounced [ˈaːɾtmanja ˈʋaːs] or [aɾˈtmaːnja ˈʋaːs]; Slovene: Artmanja vas) is a small village southeast of Dobrnič in the Municipality of Trebnje in eastern Slovenia. The area is part of the traditional region of Lower Carniola. The municipality is now included in the Southeast Slovenia Statistical Region.

== Name ==
Artmanja Vas was attested in historical sources as Herttendorf in 1250, Armansdorf in 1261, Hartmansdorff in 1354, and Artmansdarff in 1463, among other spellings.

== Climate ==
The local climate is warm, with an average temperature of 10.9 °C and an average rainfall of 1,220 mm.
