= Studenec, Trebnje =

Studenec
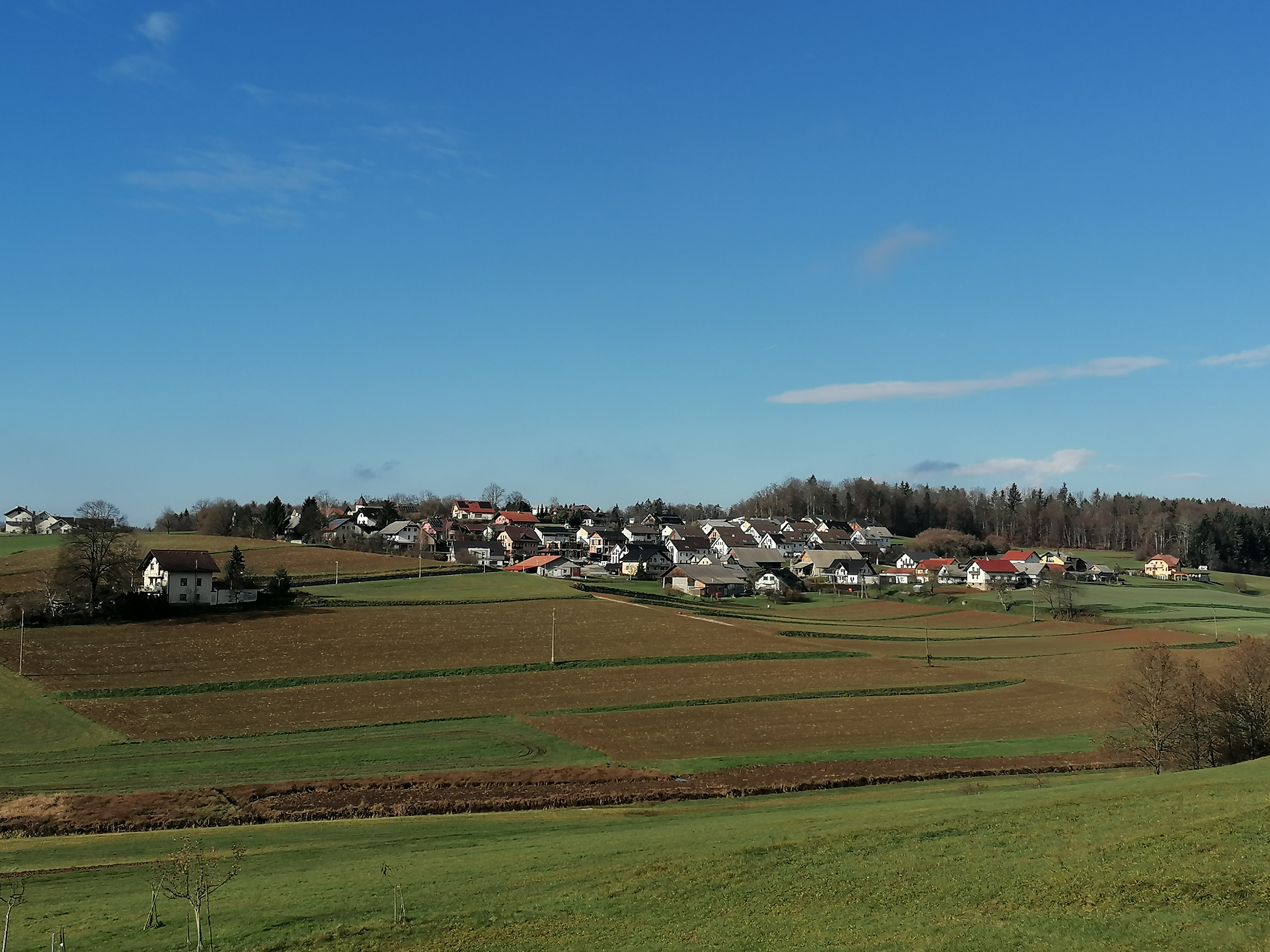

- Location in Slovenia
- Coordinates: 45°54′48.7″N 14°59′55.33″E
- Country: Slovenia
- Traditional region: Lower Carniola
- Statistical region: Southeast Slovenia
- Municipality: Trebnje

Area
  - Total: 0.51 km^{2} (0.20 sq mi)
- Elevation: 293.1 m (962 ft)

Population (2002)
  - Total: 78

Studenec (pronounced [stuˈdɛːnəts]; in older sources also Prudorf or Prudof, German: Brunndorf) is a small settlement west of Trebnje in eastern Slovenia. The Municipality of Trebnje is included in the Southeast Slovenia Statistical Region. The entire area is part of the historical region of Lower Carniola.

== History ==
The area was settled by German colonists in the 14th century and named Brunndorf (literally, 'spring village') because of the many springs in the area. Locally, the settlement is still known as Prudof.
