= Rihpovec =

- Location in Slovenia
- Coordinates: 45°54′12.61″N 15°5′28″E
- Country: Slovenia
- Traditional region: Lower Carniola
- Statistical region: Southeast Slovenia
- Municipality: Trebnje

Area
  - Total: 2.65 km^{2} (1.02 sq mi)
- Elevation: 399.4 m (1,310 ft)

Population (2002)
  - Total: 87

Rihpovec (pronounced [ˈɾiːxpɔʋəts]) is a dispersed settlement in the hills east of Trebnje in eastern Slovenia. The area is part of the historical region of Lower Carniola and is included in the Southeast Slovenia Statistical Region.
