= Dolga Njiva pri Šentlovrencu =

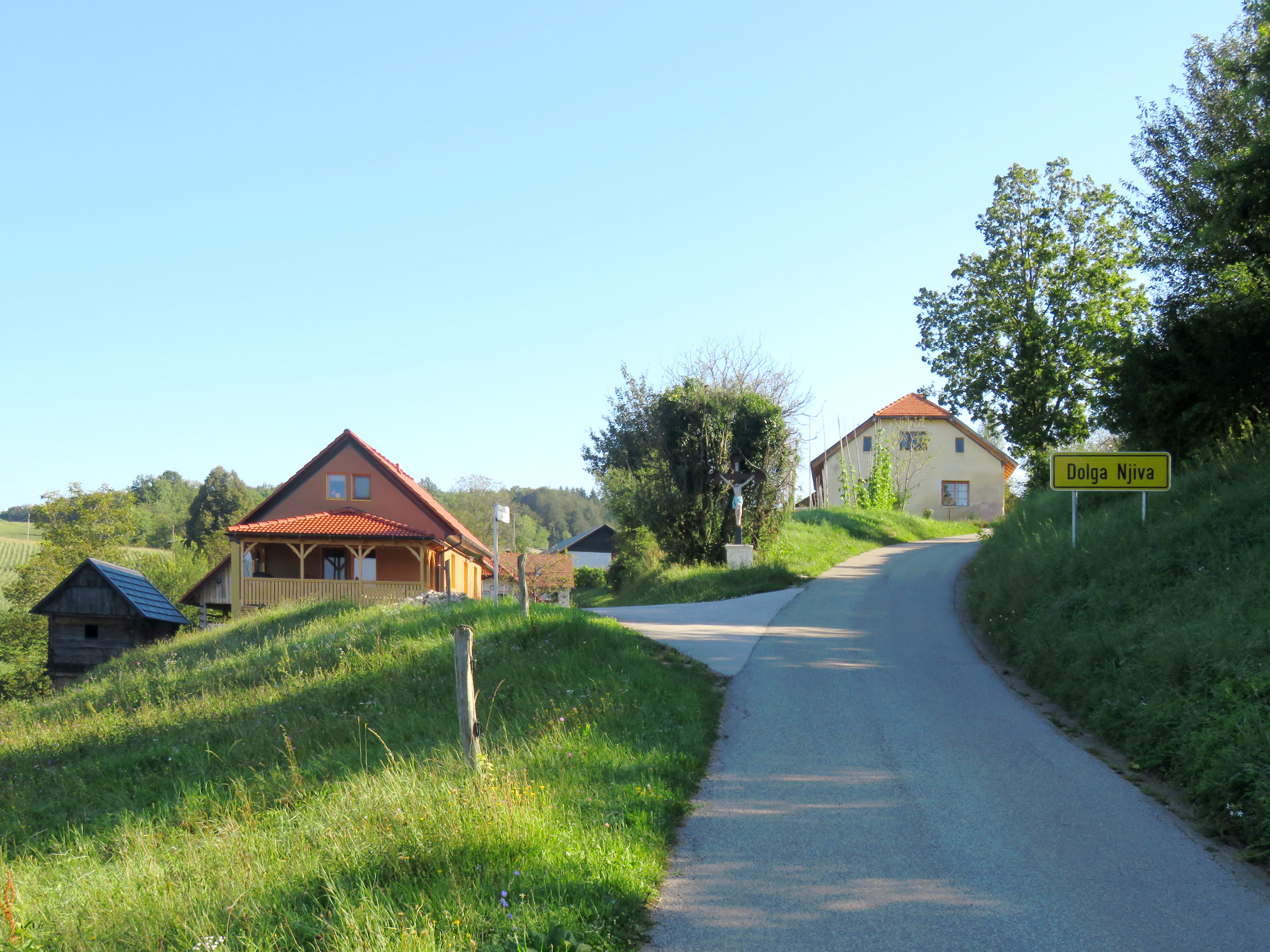

- Location in Slovenia
- Coordinates: 45°57′8.25″N 14°56′8.24″E
- Country: Slovenia
- Traditional region: Lower Carniola
- Statistical region: Southeast Slovenia
- Municipality: Trebnje

Area
  - Total: 1.42 km^{2} (0.55 sq mi)
- Elevation: 331 m (1,086 ft)

Population (2002)
  - Total: 65

Dolga Njiva pri Šentlovrencu (pronounced [ˈdoːu̯ɡa ˈnjiːʋa pɾi ʃɛntˈloːu̯ɾɛntsu] or pronounced [- ʃənt-]) is a small village north of Šentlovrenc in the Municipality of Trebnje in eastern Slovenia. The area is part of the traditional region of Lower Carniola. The municipality is now included in the Southeast Slovenia Statistical Region.

== Name ==
The name of the settlement was changed from Dolga Njiva to Dolga Njiva pri Šentlovrencu in 1953.

== Church ==
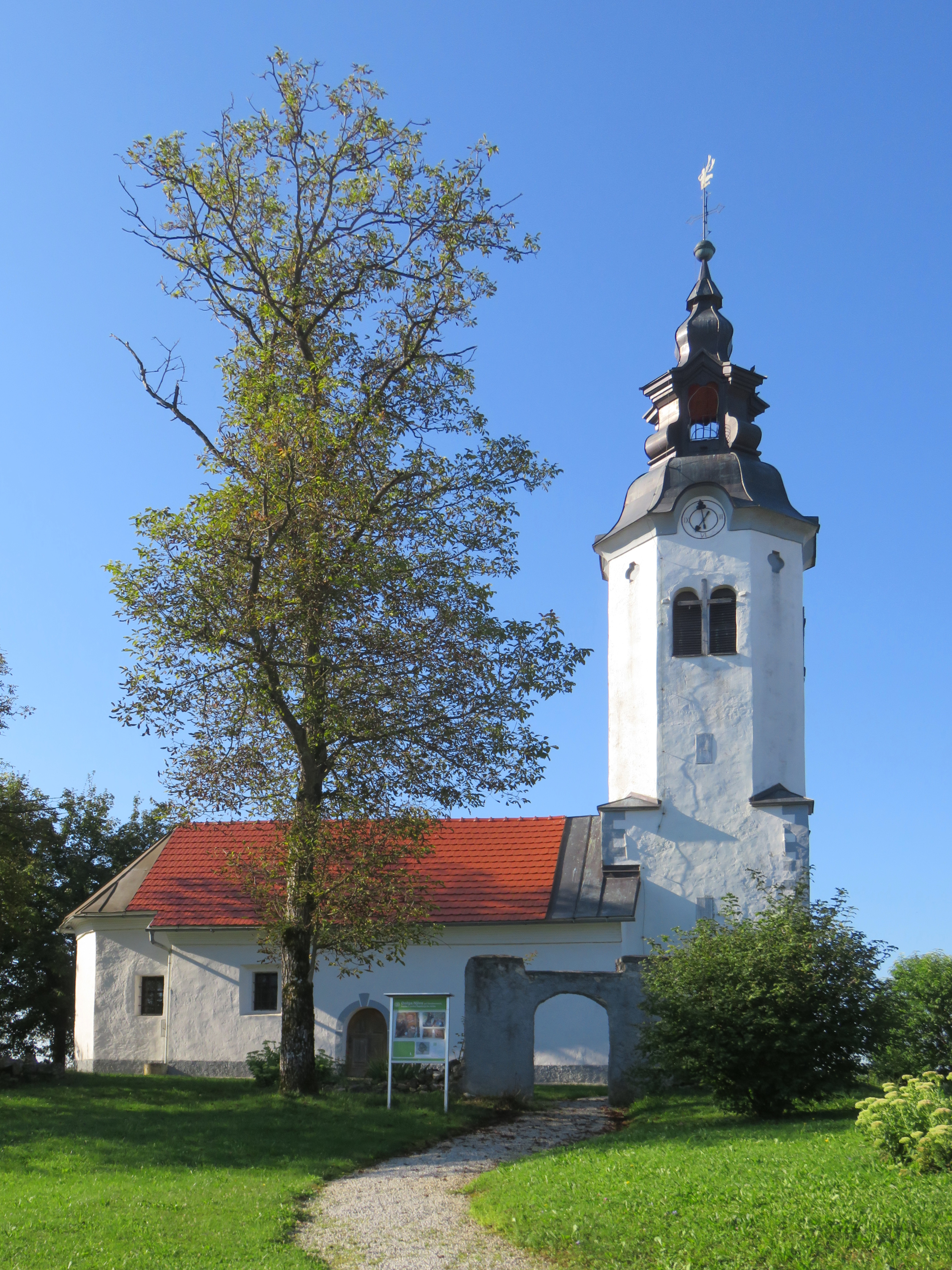
Holy Cross Church

A small church in the settlement is dedicated to the Finding of the Holy Cross and belongs to the Parish of Šentlovrenc. It is a medieval building and contains fragments of 16th-century frescos in the nave.
