= Mrzla Luža =

- Location in Slovenia
- Coordinates: 45°55′49.27″N 14°58′47.09″E
- Country: Slovenia
- Traditional region: Lower Carniola
- Statistical region: Southeast Slovenia
- Municipality: Trebnje

Area
  - Total: 0.65 km^{2} (0.25 sq mi)
- Elevation: 279.8 m (918 ft)

Population (2002)
  - Total: 28

Mrzla Luža (pronounced [ˈməɾzla ˈluːʒa]) is a small settlement in the Municipality of Trebnje in eastern Slovenia. It lies just east of Velika Loka on the road leading to Račje Selo. The area is part of the historical region of Lower Carniola. The municipality is now included in the Southeast Slovenia Statistical Region.
