= Sejenice =

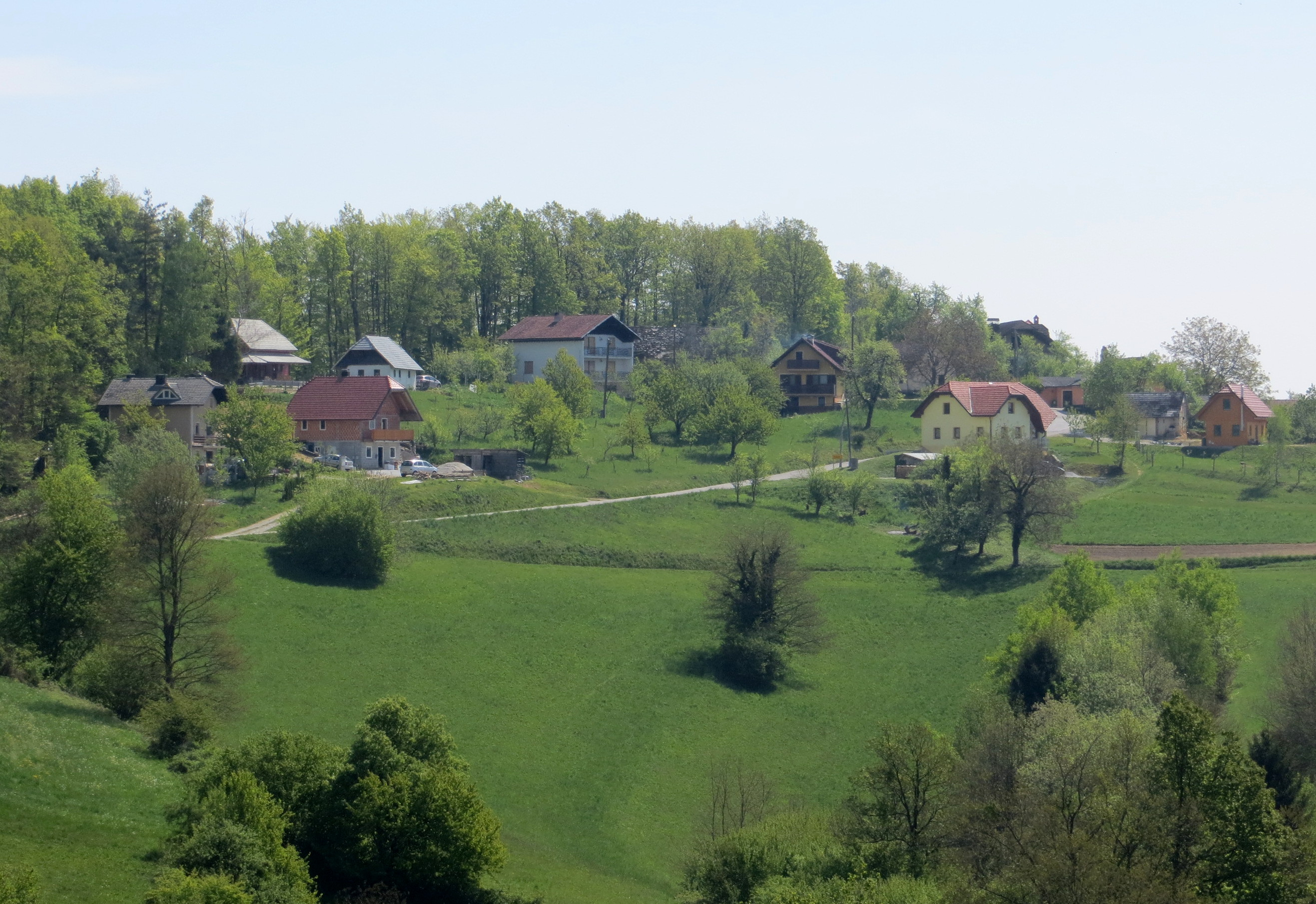

- Location in Slovenia
- Coordinates: 45°57′40.37″N 14°59′2.85″E
- Country: Slovenia
- Traditional region: Lower Carniola
- Statistical region: Southeast Slovenia
- Municipality: Trebnje

Area
  - Total: 0.75 km^{2} (0.29 sq mi)
- Elevation: 448.3 m (1,471 ft)

Population (2002)
  - Total: 25

Sejenice (pronounced [sɛjɛˈniːtsɛ]) is a small roadside settlement east of Čatež in the Municipality of Trebnje in eastern Slovenia. The area is part of the traditional region of Lower Carniola. The municipality is now included in the Southeast Slovenia Statistical Region.
