= Gorenja Nemška Vas =

- Location in Slovenia
- Coordinates: 45°54′49.02″N 14°59′2.89″E
- Country: Slovenia
- Traditional region: Lower Carniola
- Statistical region: Southeast Slovenia
- Municipality: Trebnje

Area
  - Total: 1.74 km^{2} (0.67 sq mi)
- Elevation: 301.9 m (990 ft)

Population (2002)
  - Total: 33

Gorenja Nemška Vas (pronounced [ɡɔˈɾeːnja ˈneːmʃka ˈʋaːs]; Slovene: Gorenja Nemška vas) is a settlement in the Municipality of Trebnje in eastern Slovenia. The area is part of the historical region of Lower Carniola. The municipality is now included in the Southeast Slovenia Statistical Region.

A Roman period burial ground has been identified near the settlement.
