= Municipality of Trebnje =

Municipality of Trebnje Občina Trebnje
- Municipality
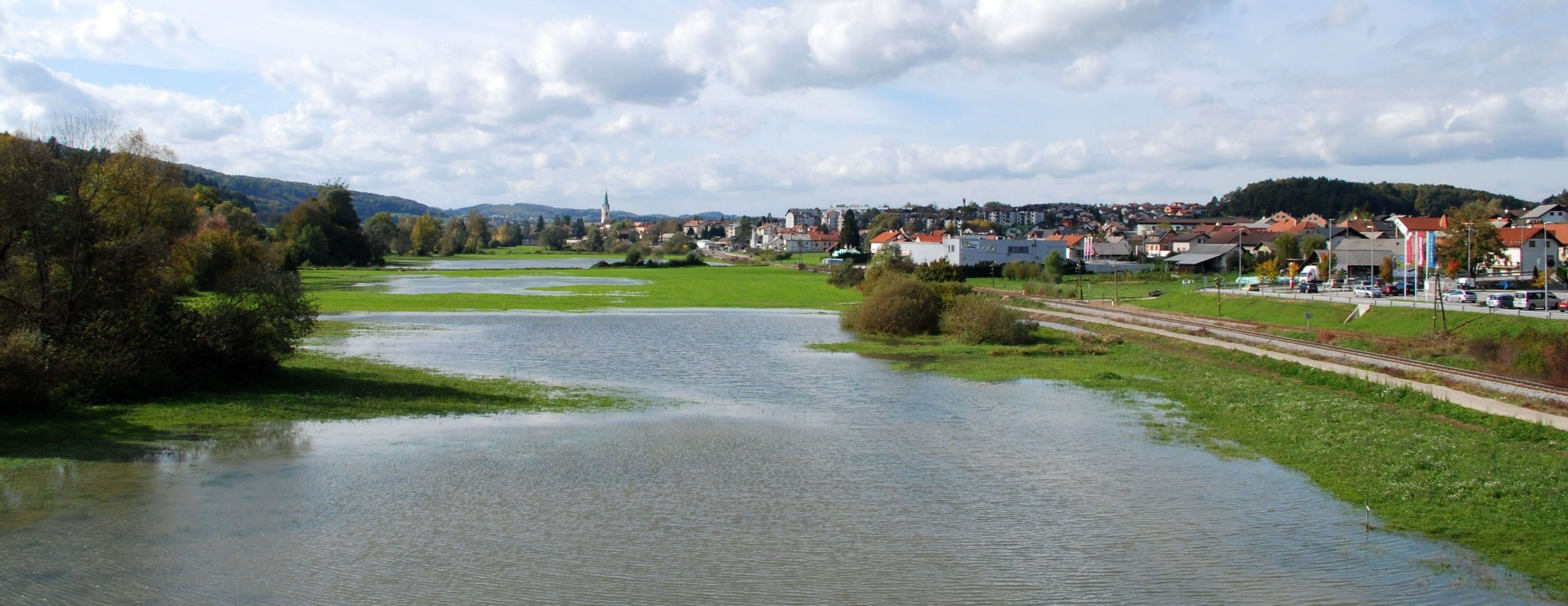

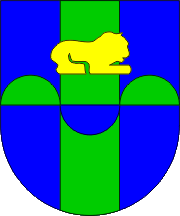
- Coat of arms

- Location of the Municipality of Trebnje in Slovenia
- Coordinates: 45°54′N 15°01′E
- Country: Slovenia

Government
  - Mayor: Mateja Povhe (Za Razvojne)

Area
  - Total: 195 km^{2} (75 sq mi)

Population (2010)
  - Total: 14,641
  - Density: 75.1/km^{2} (194/sq mi)
- Time zone: UTC+01 (CET)
  - Summer (DST): UTC+02 (CEST)
- Vehicle registration: NM
- Website: www.trebnje.si

The Municipality of Trebnje (pronounced [ˈtɾeːbnjɛ]; Slovene: Občina Trebnje) is a municipality in Slovenia in the traditional region of Lower Carniola. The seat of the municipality is the town of Trebnje.

The municipality was established on 3 October 1994. It was increased in size on 6 August 1998, when the settlements of Kostanjevica and Ravne nad Šentrupertom were transferred to the municipality from the neighboring Municipality of Litija. It was then reduced in size on 13 June 2006 with the formation of the new municipalities of Mokronog-Trebelno and Šentrupert from the municipality's territory. On February 26, 2011, Trebnje was again reduced in size when the Municipality of Mirna was reestablished.

== Settlements ==
In addition to the municipal seat of Trebnje, the municipality also includes the following settlements:

- Arčelca
- Artmanja Vas
- Babna Gora
- Belšinja Vas
- Benečija
- Bič
- Blato
- Breza
- Čatež
- Češnjevek
- Cesta
- Dečja Vas
- Dobrava
- Dobravica pri Velikem Gabru
- Dobrnič
- Dol pri Trebnjem
- Dolenja Dobrava
- Dolenja Nemška Vas
- Dolenja Vas pri Čatežu
- Dolenje Kamenje pri Dobrniču
- Dolenje Medvedje Selo
- Dolenje Ponikve
- Dolenje Selce
- Dolenji Podboršt pri Trebnjem
- Dolenji Podšumberk
- Dolenji Vrh
- Dolga Njiva pri Šentlovrencu
- Dolnje Prapreče
- Goljek
- Gombišče
- Gorenja Dobrava
- Gorenja Nemška Vas
- Gorenja Vas
- Gorenja Vas pri Čatežu
- Gorenje Kamenje pri Dobrniču
- Gorenje Medvedje Selo
- Gorenje Ponikve
- Gorenje Selce
- Gorenji Podboršt pri Veliki Loki
- Gorenji Podšumberk
- Gorenji Vrh pri Dobrniču
- Gorica na Medvedjeku
- Gornje Prapreče
- Gradišče pri Trebnjem
- Grič pri Trebnjem
- Grm
- Grmada
- Hudeje
- Iglenik pri Veliki Loki
- Jezero
- Kamni Potok
- Knežja Vas
- Korenitka
- Korita
- Kriška Reber
- Križ
- Krtina
- Krušni Vrh
- Kukenberk
- Lipnik
- Lisec
- Log pri Žužemberku
- Lokve pri Dobrniču
- Lukovek
- Luža
- Mačji Dol
- Mačkovec
- Mala Loka
- Mala Ševnica
- Male Dole pri Stehanji Vasi
- Mali Gaber
- Mali Videm
- Martinja Vas
- Medvedjek
- Meglenik
- Mrzla Luža
- Muhabran
- Občine
- Odrga
- Orlaka
- Pekel
- Pluska
- Podlisec
- Potok
- Preska pri Dobrniču
- Primštal
- Pristavica pri Velikem Gabru
- Račje Selo
- Razbore
- Rdeči Kal
- Repče
- Replje
- Reva
- Rihpovec
- Rodine pri Trebnjem
- Roje pri Čatežu
- Roženpelj
- Rožni Vrh
- Šahovec
- Sejenice
- Sela pri Šumberku
- Šentlovrenc
- Škovec
- Šmaver
- Štefan pri Trebnjem
- Stehanja Vas
- Stranje pri Dobrniču
- Stranje pri Velikem Gabru
- Studenec
- Svetinja
- Trebanjski Vrh
- Trnje
- Vavpča Vas pri Dobrniču
- Vejar
- Velika Loka
- Velika Ševnica
- Velike Dole
- Veliki Gaber
- Veliki Videm
- Volčja Jama
- Vrbovec
- Vrhovo pri Šentlovrencu
- Vrhtrebnje
- Vrtače
- Žabjek
- Zagorica pri Čatežu
- Zagorica pri Dobrniču
- Zagorica pri Velikem Gabru
- Zavrh
- Železno
- Zidani Most
- Žubina
