= Pluska =

- Location in Slovenia
- Coordinates: 45°54′43.17″N 14°57′37.04″E
- Country: Slovenia
- Traditional region: Lower Carniola
- Statistical region: Southeast Slovenia
- Municipality: Trebnje

Area
  - Total: 0.75 km^{2} (0.29 sq mi)
- Elevation: 319.5 m (1,048 ft)

Population (2002)
  - Total: 44

Pluska (pronounced [ˈpluːska]) is a small settlement in the Municipality of Trebnje in eastern Slovenia. It lies west of Trebnje with the A2 motorway running across the settlement's territory. The area is part of the traditional region of Lower Carniola and is now included in the Southeast Slovenia Statistical Region.
