= Mačji Dol =

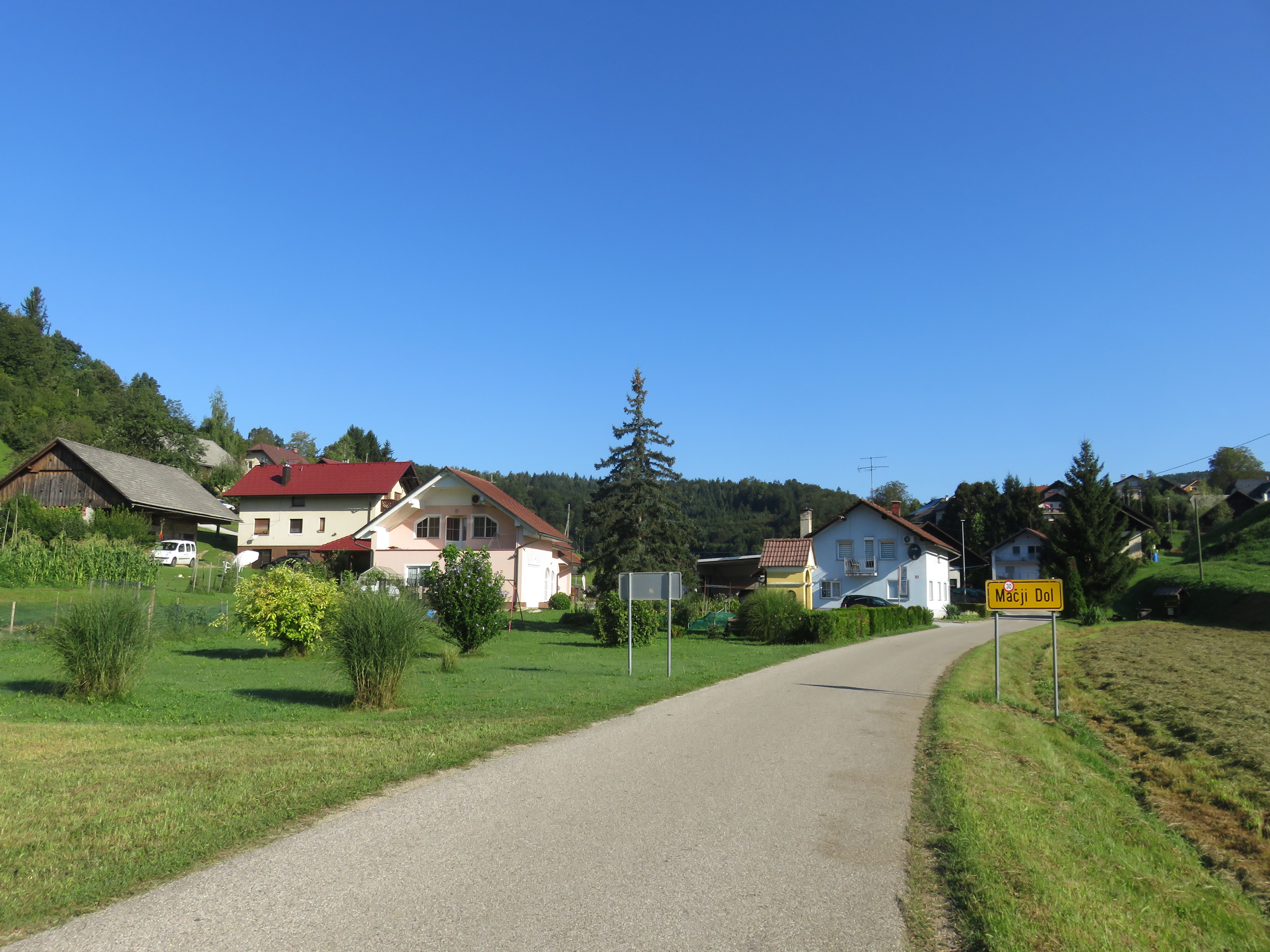

- Location in Slovenia
- Coordinates: 45°57′6.94″N 14°55′44.56″E
- Country: Slovenia
- Traditional region: Lower Carniola
- Statistical region: Southeast Slovenia
- Municipality: Trebnje

Area
  - Total: 1.26 km^{2} (0.49 sq mi)
- Elevation: 302.5 m (992 ft)

Population (2002)
  - Total: 64

Mačji Dol (pronounced [ˈmaːtʃji ˈdoːu̯], German: Katzenthal) is a small settlement northwest of Šentlovrenc in the Municipality of Trebnje in eastern Slovenia. The municipality is part of the historical region of Lower Carniola and is now included in the Southeast Slovenia Statistical Region.

== Name ==
Mačji Dol is also known locally as Marč(j)i Dol, from which the local adjective marovski/marovški is derived (e.g., Marovška zijalka 'Mačji Dol Cave' at the north end of the village, as well as Marovška dolina 'Mačji Dol Valley' extending southeast of the village).

== Cultural heritage ==
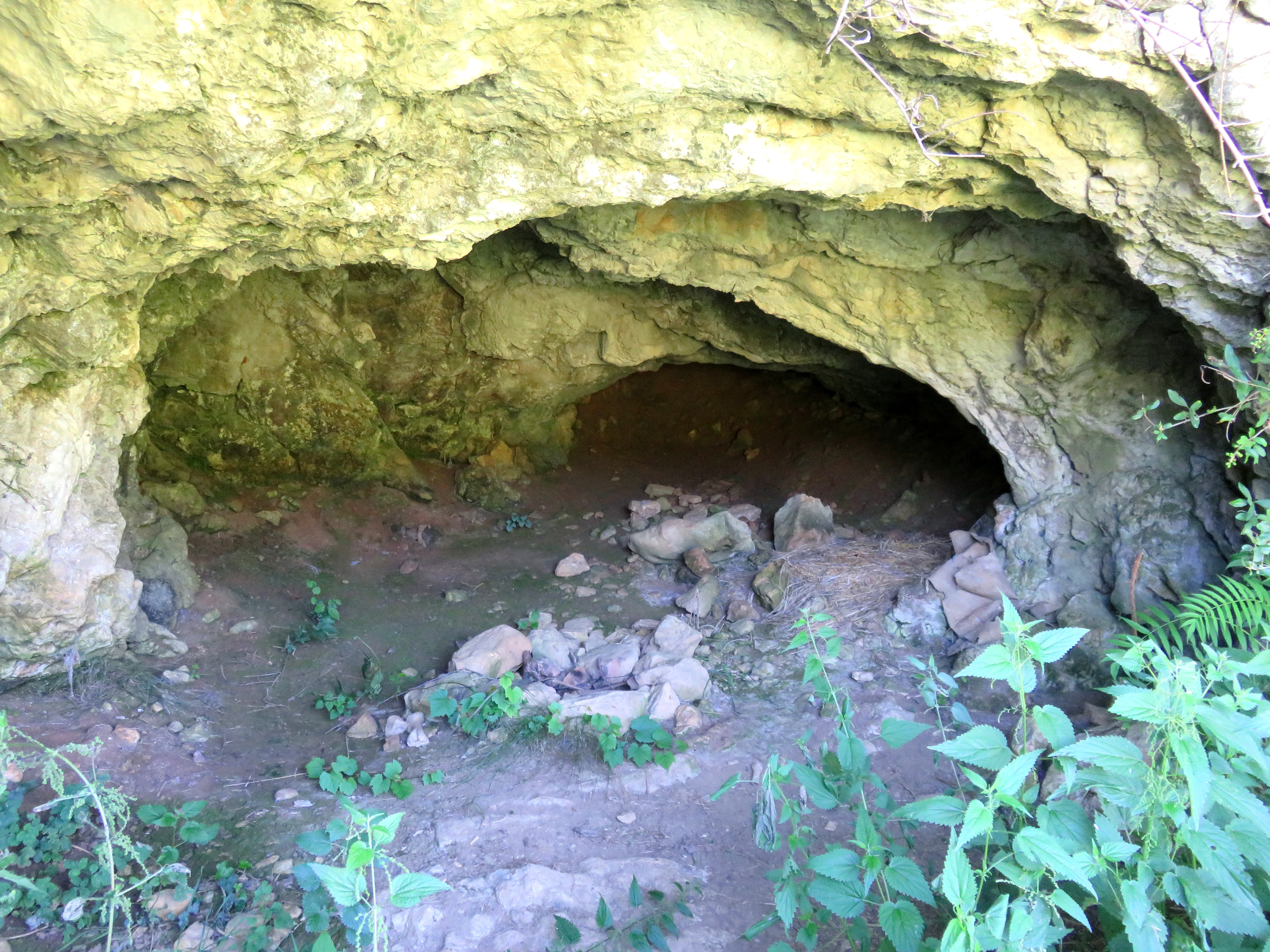
Mačji Dol Cave

Mačji Dol Cave (Slovene: Marovška zijalka) is an archaeological site along the road from Mačji Dol to Dolnji Vrh. It was used by Pleistocene hunters, and stone tools from the Middle Paleolithic have been found. The site was investigated by the archaeologist Franc Osole in 1974 and 1975.
