= Babna Gora, Trebnje =

Babna Gora
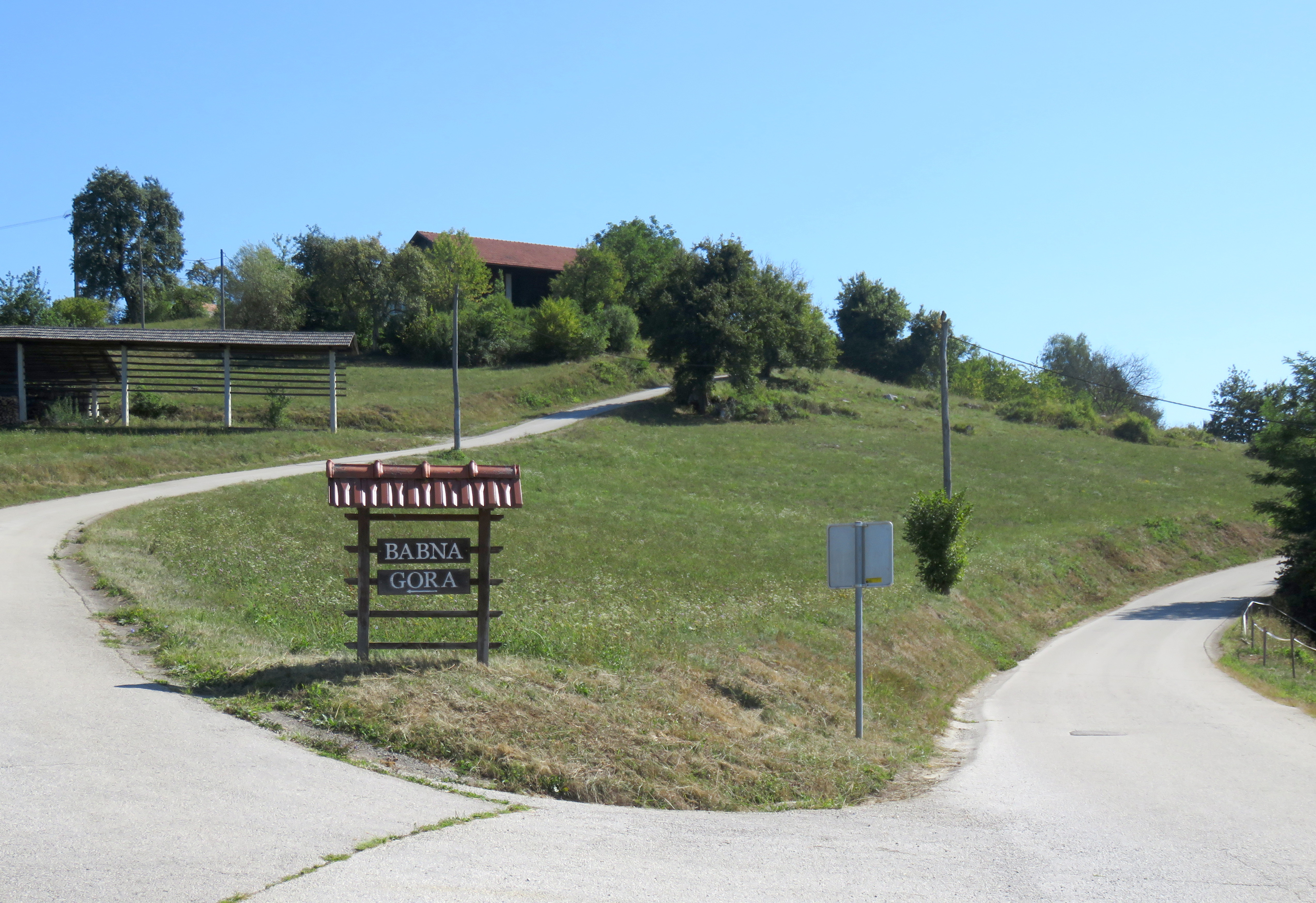

- Location in Slovenia
- Coordinates: 45°54′4.87″N 14°55′2.1″E
- Country: Slovenia
- Traditional region: Lower Carniola
- Statistical region: Southeast Slovenia
- Municipality: Trebnje

Area
  - Total: 1.04 km^{2} (0.40 sq mi)
- Elevation: 393.5 m (1,291 ft)

Population (2002)
  - Total: 16

Babna Gora (pronounced [ˈbaːbna ˈɡɔːɾa]) is a small settlement in the Municipality of Trebnje in eastern Slovenia. The municipality is included in the Southeast Slovenia Statistical Region. The entire area is part of the traditional region of Lower Carniola.
