= Šahovec =

- Location in Slovenia
- Coordinates: 45°52′42.69″N 14°59′50.23″E
- Country: Slovenia
- Traditional region: Lower Carniola
- Statistical region: Southeast Slovenia
- Municipality: Trebnje

Area
  - Total: 1.18 km^{2} (0.46 sq mi)
- Elevation: 343.6 m (1,127 ft)

Population (2002)
  - Total: 68

Šahovec (pronounced [ˈʃaːxɔʋəts]) is a small village east of Dobrnič in the Municipality of Trebnje in eastern Slovenia. The area is part of the historical region of Lower Carniola. The municipality is now included in the Southeast Slovenia Statistical Region.

The local church is dedicated to the Holy Spirit and belongs to the Parish of Dobrnič. It was first mentioned in written documents dating to 1526 and was extensively remodelled in the Baroque style in the early 18th century.
