= Stranje pri Velikem Gabru =

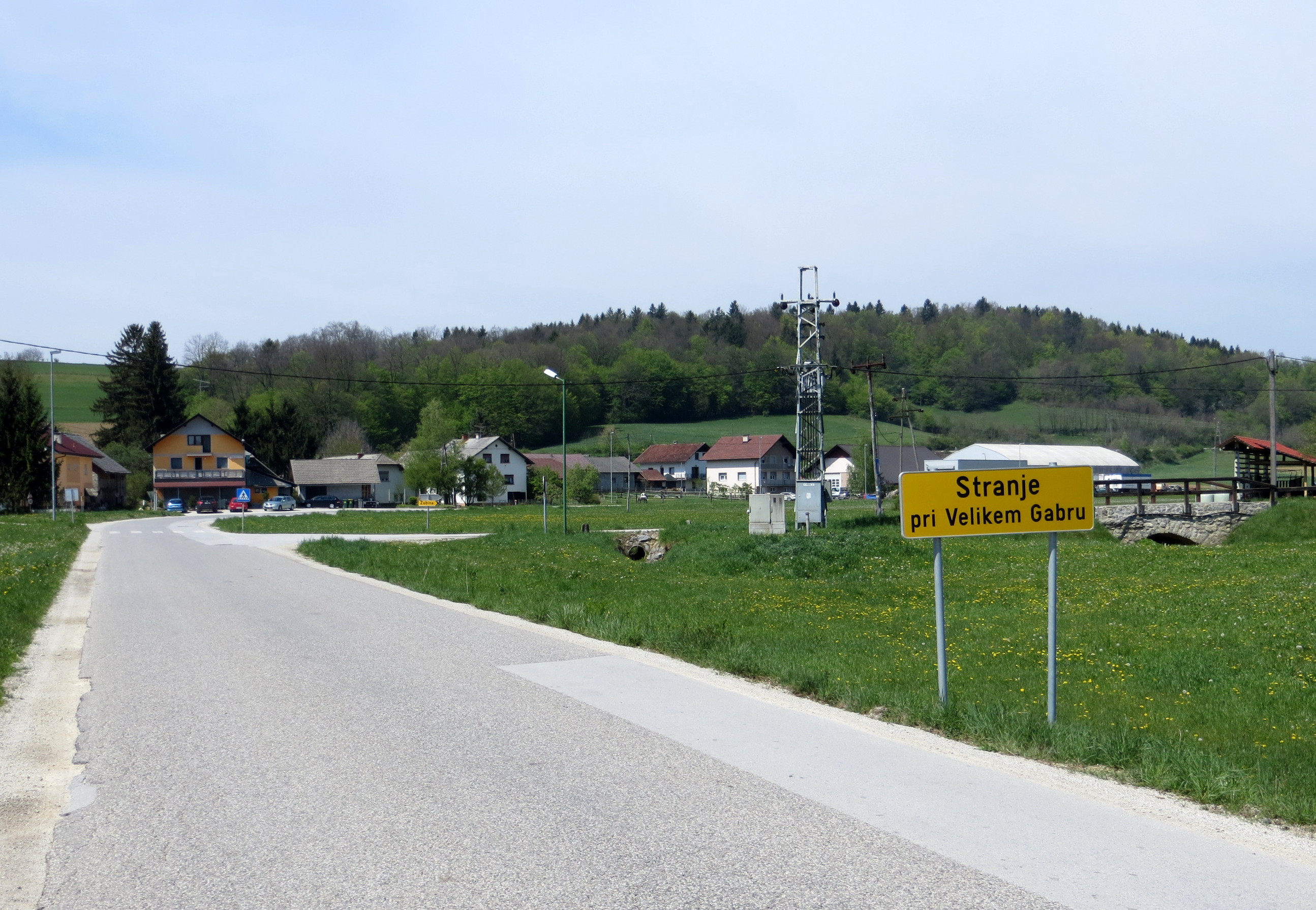

- Location in Slovenia
- Coordinates: 45°56′30.61″N 14°54′35.43″E
- Country: Slovenia
- Traditional region: Lower Carniola
- Statistical region: Southeast Slovenia
- Municipality: Trebnje

Area
  - Total: 0.55 km^{2} (0.21 sq mi)
- Elevation: 297.3 m (975 ft)

Population (2002)
  - Total: 42

Stranje pri Velikem Gabru (pronounced [ˈstɾaːnjɛ pɾi ˈʋeːlikɛm ˈɡaːbɾu]; German: Straindorf) is a settlement in the Municipality of Trebnje in eastern Slovenia. It lies on the Temenica River just north of Veliki Gaber. The area is part of the historical region of Lower Carniola. The municipality is now included in the Southeast Slovenia Statistical Region.

== Name ==
The name of the settlement was changed from Stranje to Stranje pri Velikem Gabru in 1953. In the past the German name was Straindorf.

== Cultural heritage ==
A Roman-period burial ground was excavated in the settlement between 1885 and 1903. Fifty graves were documented.
