= Dolenja Vas pri Čatežu =

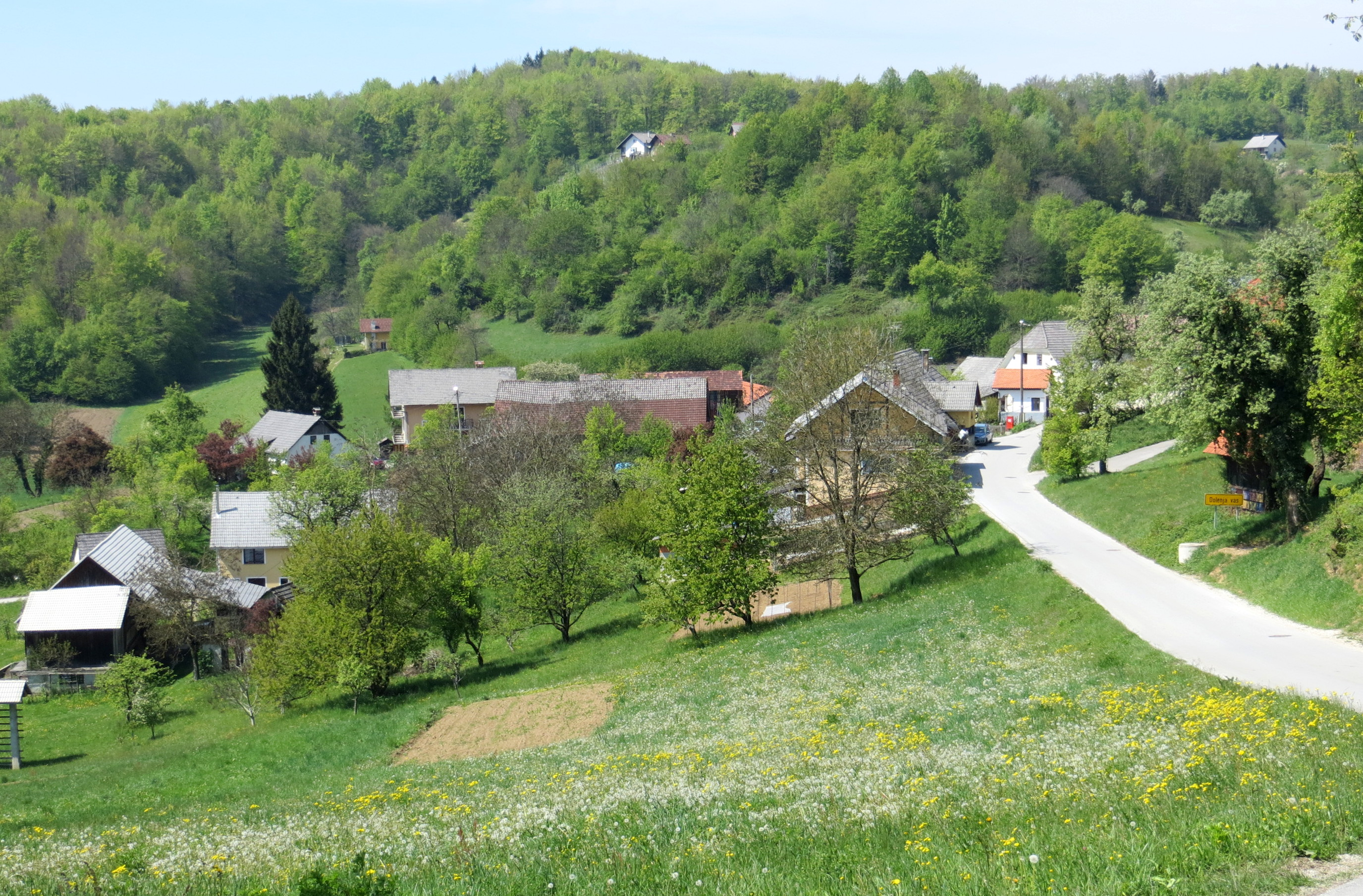

- Location in Slovenia
- Coordinates: 45°57′56.24″N 14°58′9.89″E
- Country: Slovenia
- Traditional region: Lower Carniola
- Statistical region: Southeast Slovenia
- Municipality: Trebnje

Area
  - Total: 0.72 km^{2} (0.28 sq mi)
- Elevation: 417.4 m (1,369 ft)

Population (2002)
  - Total: 55

Dolenja Vas pri Čatežu (pronounced [dɔˈleːnja ˈʋaːs pɾi ˈtʃaːtɛʒu]; Slovene: Dolenja vas pri Čatežu) is a small settlement in the Municipality of Trebnje in eastern Slovenia. It lies in the hills north of Trebnje, just east of Čatež. The area is part of the historical Lower Carniola region. The municipality is now included in the Southeast Slovenia Statistical Region.

== Name ==
The name of the settlement was changed from Dolenja vas to Dolenja vas pri Čatežu in 1955.
