= Mali Gaber =

- Location in Slovenia
- Coordinates: 45°56′24.11″N 14°54′5.26″E
- Country: Slovenia
- Traditional region: Lower Carniola
- Statistical region: Southeast Slovenia
- Municipality: Trebnje

Area
  - Total: 1.12 km^{2} (0.43 sq mi)
- Elevation: 338.6 m (1,111 ft)

Population (2002)
  - Total: 78

Mali Gaber (pronounced [ˈmaːli ˈɡaːbəɾ]; German: Kleingaber) is a small village northwest of Veliki Gaber in the Municipality of Trebnje in eastern Slovenia. The area is part of the historical region of Lower Carniola. The municipality is now included in the Southeast Slovenia Statistical Region.

The local church is dedicated to Saint Michael and belongs to the Parish of Veliki Gaber. It was first mentioned in written documents dating to 1643 and was extensively rebuilt in the 18th and 19th centuries.
