= Gornje Prapreče =

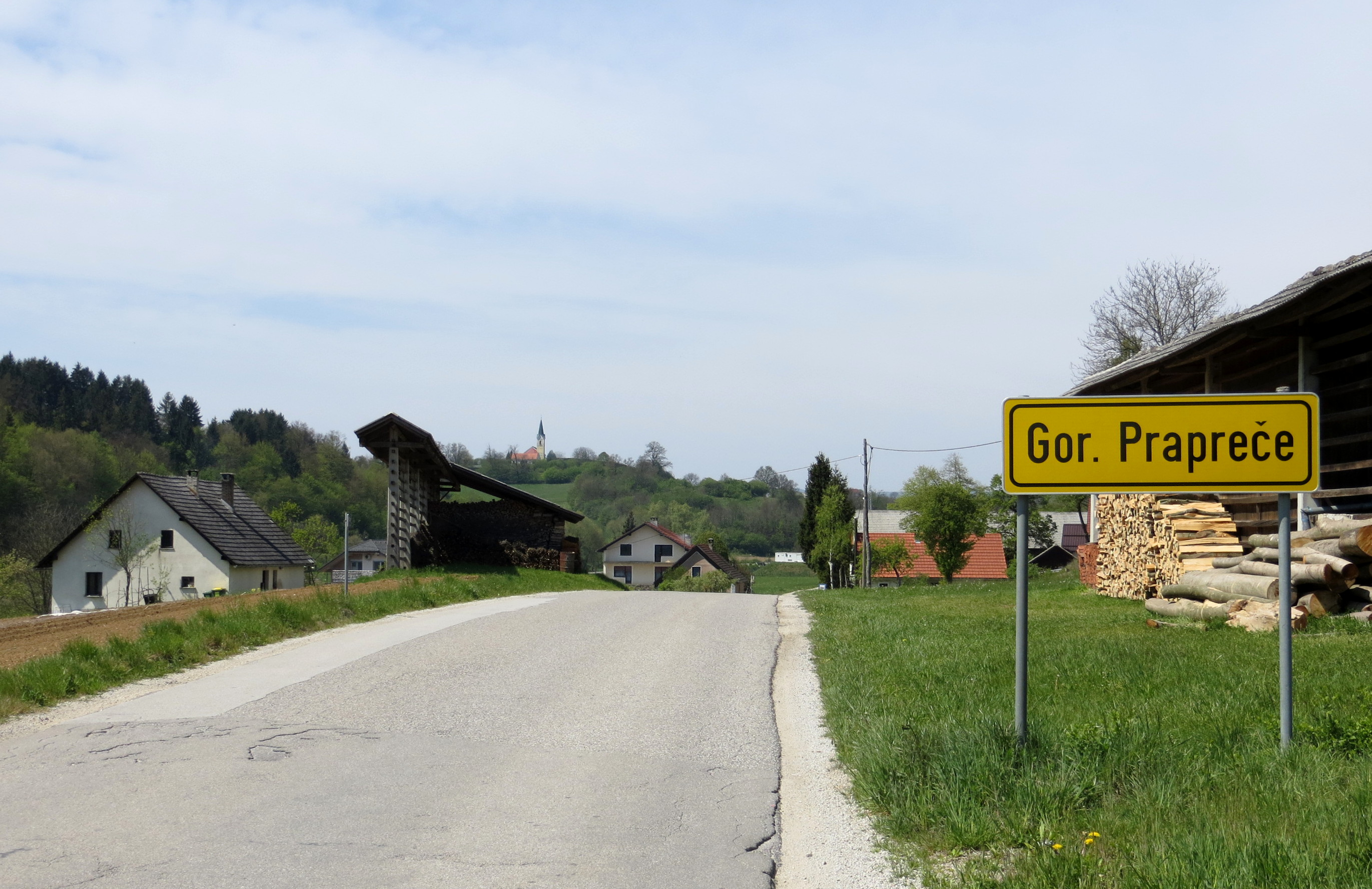

- Location in Slovenia
- Coordinates: 45°56′15.42″N 14°55′15.38″E
- Country: Slovenia
- Traditional region: Lower Carniola
- Statistical region: Southeast Slovenia
- Municipality: Trebnje

Area
  - Total: 0.56 km^{2} (0.22 sq mi)
- Elevation: 296.7 m (973 ft)

Population (2002)
  - Total: 31

Gornje Prapreče (pronounced [ˈɡoːɾnjɛ ˈpɾaːpɾɛtʃɛ]; in older sources also Gorenje Prapreče, German: Oberprapretsche) is a small settlement in the Municipality of Trebnje in eastern Slovenia. It lies on the left bank of the Temenica River west of Šentlovrenc. The area is part of the historical region of Lower Carniola. The municipality is now included in the Southeast Slovenia Statistical Region.
