= Lukovek =

- Location in Slovenia
- Coordinates: 45°54′10.72″N 15°4′10.05″E
- Country: Slovenia
- Traditional region: Lower Carniola
- Statistical region: Southeast Slovenia
- Municipality: Trebnje

Area
  - Total: 1.37 km^{2} (0.53 sq mi)
- Elevation: 306.6 m (1,006 ft)

Population (2002)
  - Total: 78

Lukovek (pronounced [ˈluːkɔʋək]) is a village in the Municipality of Trebnje in eastern Slovenia. The area is part of the historical region of Lower Carniola. The municipality is now included in the Southeast Slovenia Statistical Region.

The local church is dedicated to Saint George and belongs to the Parish of Trebnje. It was first mentioned in written documents dating to 1498.
