= Stranje pri Dobrniču =

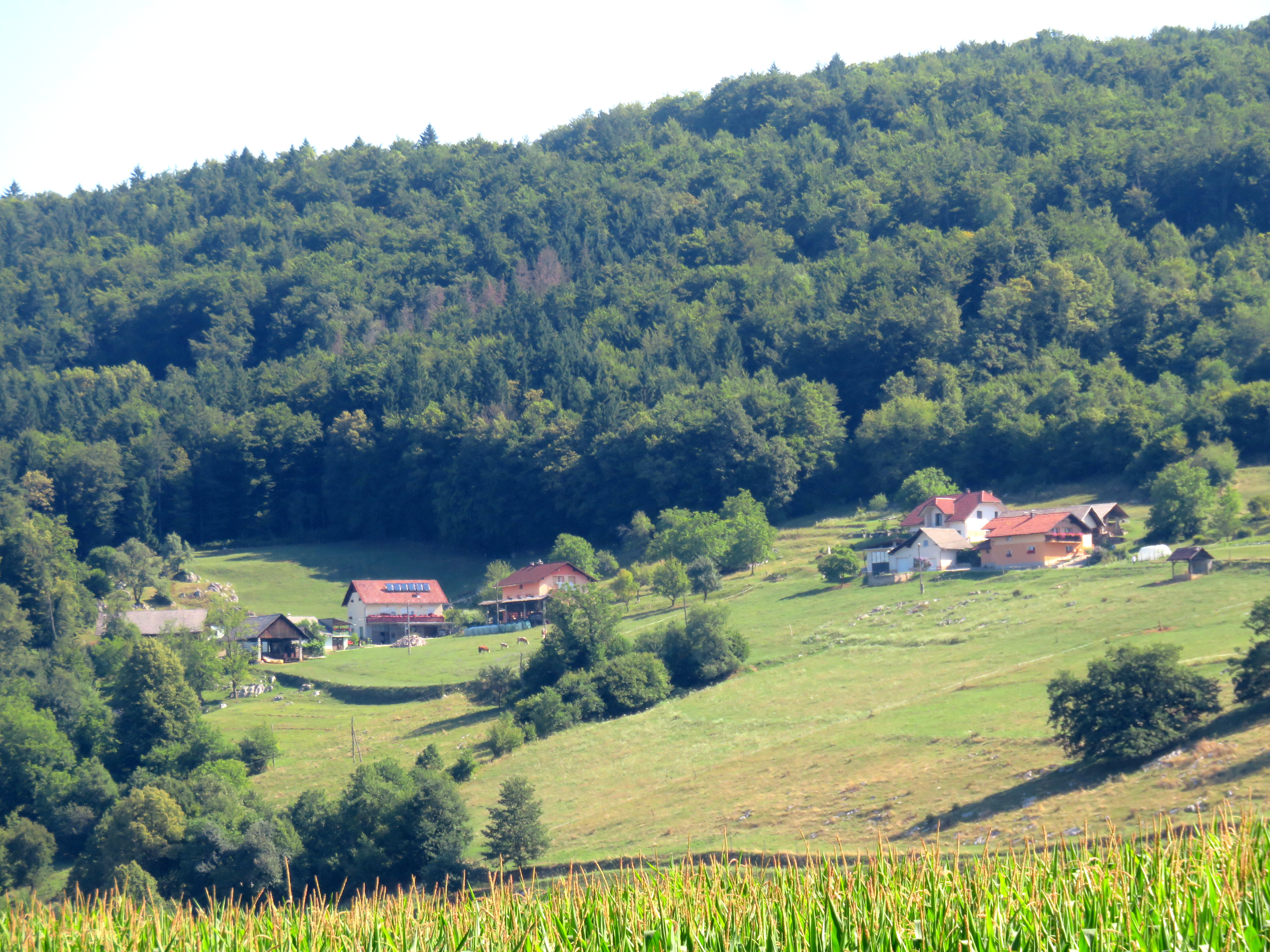

- Location in Slovenia
- Coordinates: 45°53′17.67″N 14°58′34.6″E
- Country: Slovenia
- Traditional region: Lower Carniola
- Statistical region: Southeast Slovenia
- Municipality: Trebnje

Area
  - Total: 1.99 km^{2} (0.77 sq mi)
- Elevation: 254.5 m (835 ft)

Population (2002)
  - Total: 20

Stranje pri Dobrniču (pronounced [ˈstɾaːnjɛ pɾi ˈdoːbəɾnitʃu]) is a small settlement north of Dobrnič in the Municipality of Trebnje in eastern Slovenia. The municipality is included in the Southeast Slovenia Statistical Region. The entire area is part of the historical region of Lower Carniola.

== Name ==
The name of the settlement was changed from Stranje to Stranje pri Dobrniču in 1953.
