= Preska pri Dobrniču =

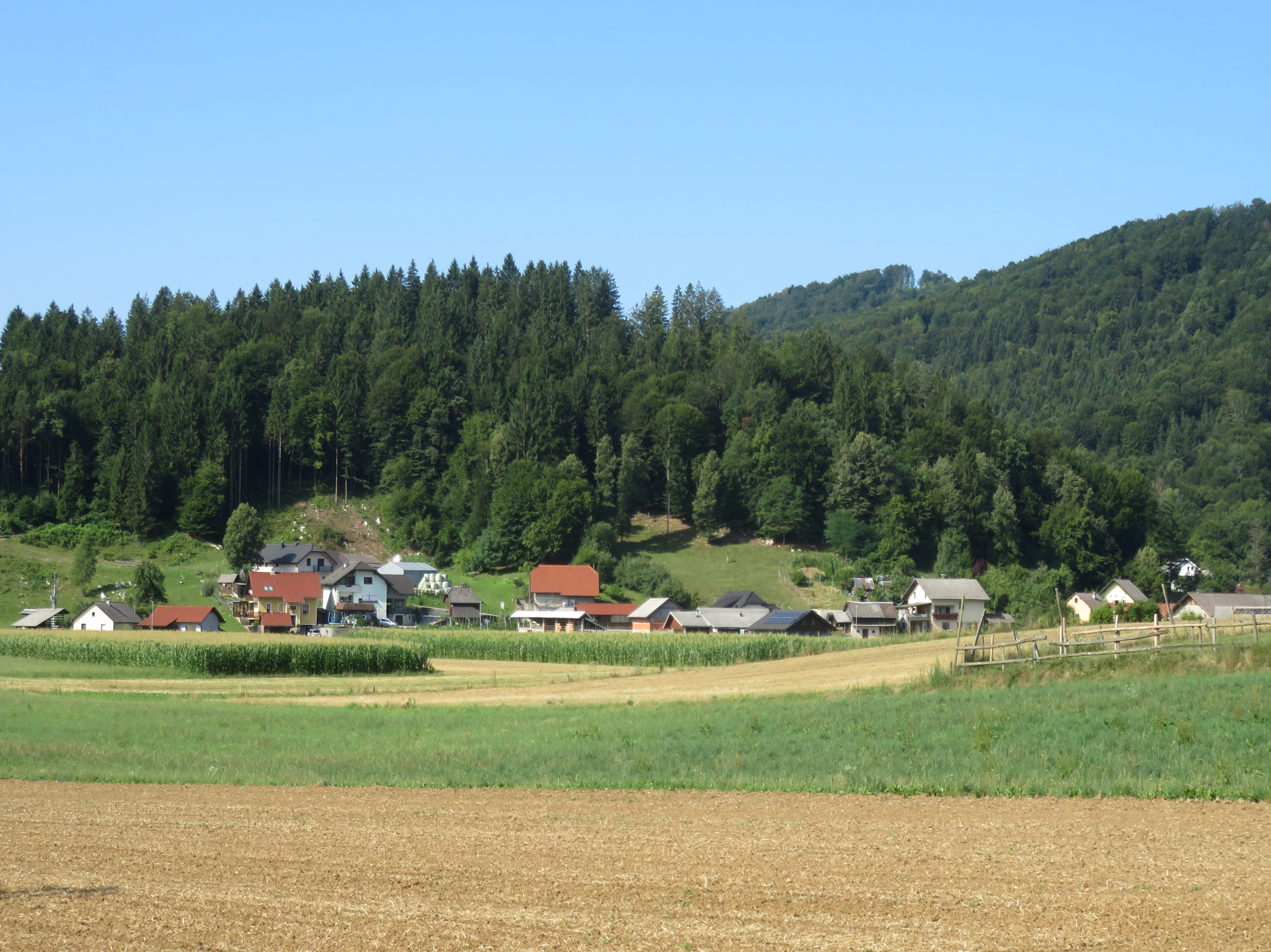

- Location in Slovenia
- Coordinates: 45°52′16.45″N 14°58′34.18″E
- Country: Slovenia
- Traditional region: Lower Carniola
- Statistical region: Southeast Slovenia
- Municipality: Trebnje

Area
  - Total: 0.48 km^{2} (0.19 sq mi)
- Elevation: 235 m (771 ft)

Population (2002)
  - Total: 75

Preska pri Dobrniču (pronounced [ˈpɾeːska pɾi ˈdoːbəɾnitʃu]) is a small settlement just south of Dobrnič in the Municipality of Trebnje in eastern Slovenia. The area is part of the traditional region of Lower Carniola and is now included in the Southeast Slovenia Statistical Region.

== Name ==
Preska was attested in historical sources as Gehag in 1397, Ghag in 1425, Kag and Presekch in 1447, and Pressek in 1507. The name is derived from the common noun presika (standardized as preseka) 'cleared area through the woods' and 'hedge; drainage ditch; cross-valley', referring to a feature that divides the terrain into two parts. The name of the settlement was changed from Preska to Preska pri Dobrniču in 1953.
