= Štefan pri Trebnjem =

Štefan pri Trebnjem Sveti Štefan (until 1955)
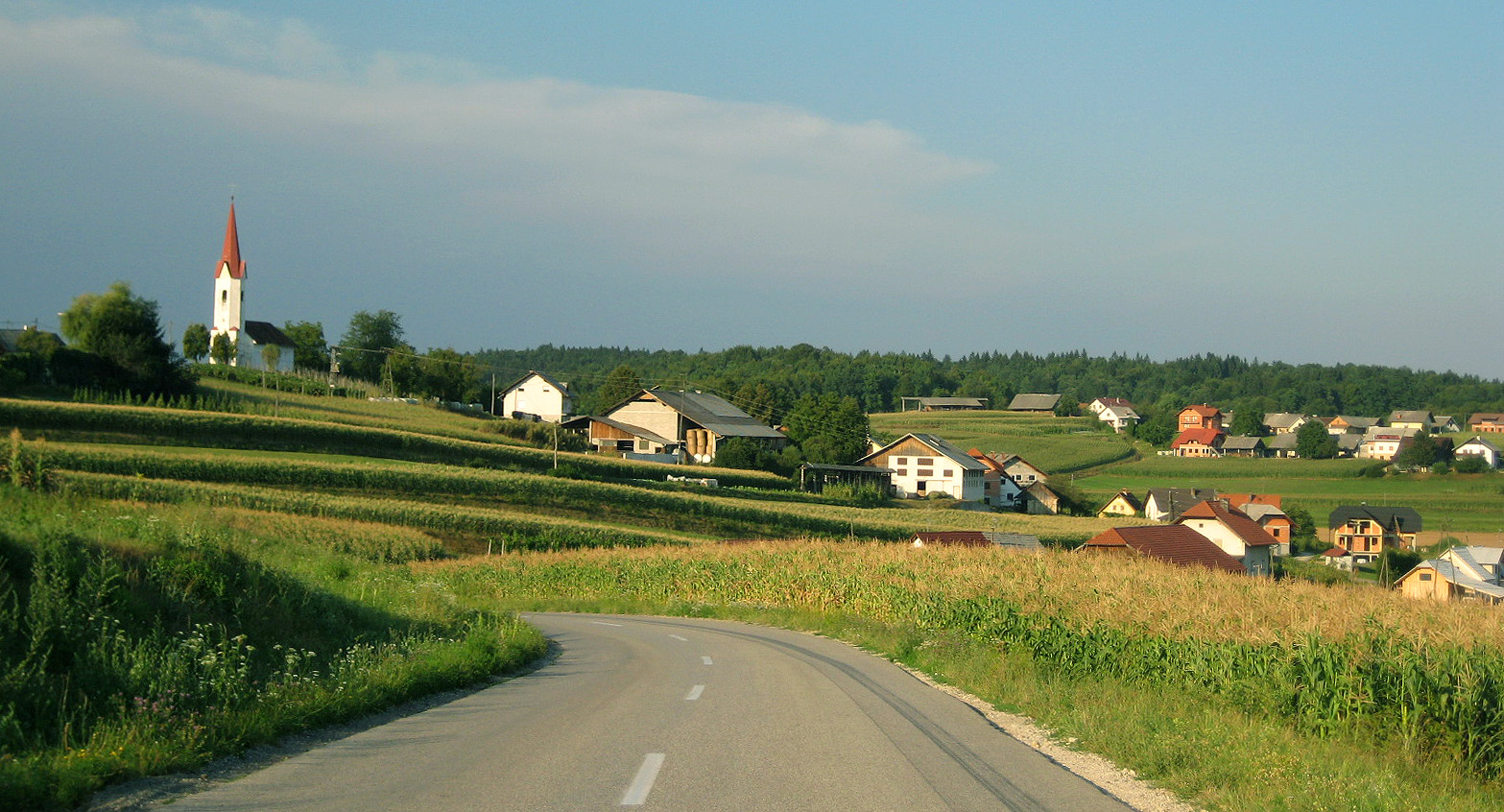

- Location in Slovenia
- Coordinates: 45°54′32.18″N 14°59′19.6″E
- Country: Slovenia
- Traditional region: Lower Carniola
- Statistical region: Southeast Slovenia
- Municipality: Trebnje

Area
  - Total: 0.33 km^{2} (0.13 sq mi)
- Elevation: 277.7 m (911 ft)

Population (2002)
  - Total: 146

Štefan pri Trebnjem (pronounced [ˈʃteːfam pɾi ˈtɾeːbnjɛm]) is a small village in the Municipality of Trebnje in eastern Slovenia. It lies on the left bank of the Temenica River just west of Trebnje. The area is part of the historical region of Lower Carniola. The municipality is now included in the Southeast Slovenia Statistical Region.

== Name ==
The name of the settlement was changed from Sveti Štefan (literally, 'Saint Stephen') to Štefan pri Trebnjem (literally, 'Stephen near Trebnje') in 1955. The name was changed on the basis of the 1948 Law on Names of Settlements and Designations of Squares, Streets, and Buildings as part of efforts by Slovenia's postwar communist government to remove religious elements from toponyms.

== Church ==
The local church, from which the settlement gets its name, is dedicated to Saint Stephen and belongs to the Parish of Trebnje. It was first mentioned in written documents dating to 1526. It was expanded in the 17th century. The belfry dates to the 18th century.
