= List of cities, towns, and villages in Slovenia: M =

This is a list of cities, towns, and villages in Slovenia, starting with M.

Settlement	Municipality
Mače	Preddvor
Mačji Dol	Trebnje
Mački	Velike Lašče
Mačkovci	Puconci
Mačkovec pri Dvoru	Žužemberk
Mačkovec pri Suhorju	Metlika
Mačkovec pri Škocjanu	Škocjan
Mačkovec	Kočevje
Mačkovec	Laško
Mačkovec	Trebnje
Magolnik	Litija
Magozd	Kobarid
Mahneti	Cerknica
Mahniči	Sežana
Mahovci	Gornja Radgona
Mahovnik	Kočevje
Majcni	Sežana
Majski Vrh	Videm
Majšperk	Majšperk
Makole	Slovenska Bistrica
Makoše	Ribnica
Mala Brda	Postojna
Mala Breza	Laško
Mala Bukovica	Ilirska Bistrica
Mala Cikava	Novo mesto
Mala Dobrava	Ivančna Gorica
Mala Dolina	Brežice
Mala Goba	Litija
Mala Gora	Kočevje
Mala Gora	Zreče
Mala Goričica	Ivančna Gorica
Mala Hubajnica	Sevnica
Mala Ilova Gora	Grosuplje
Mala Kostrevnica	Litija
Mala Lahinja	Črnomelj
Mala Lašna	Lukovica
Mala Ligojna	Vrhnika
Mala Loka pri Višnji Gori	Grosuplje
Mala Loka	Domžale
Mala Loka	Trebnje
Mala Mislinja	Mislinja
Mala Nedelja	Ljutomer
Mala Pirešica	Žalec
Mala Polana	Velika Polana
Mala Pristava	Pivka
Mala Pristava	Šmarje pri Jelšah
Mala Račna	Grosuplje
Mala Sela	Črnomelj
Mala Sela	Litija
Mala Slevica	Velike Lašče
Mala Stara vas	Grosuplje
Mala Strmica	Novo mesto
Mala Ševnica	Trebnje
Mala Štanga	Litija
Mala Varnica	Videm
Mala vas pri Grosupljem	Grosuplje
Mala vas pri Ormožu	Ormož
Mala vas	Dobrepolje
Mala vas	Gorišnica
Malahorna	Oplotnica
Male Braslovče	Braslovče
Male Brusnice	Novo mesto
Male Češnjice	Ivančna Gorica
Male Dole pri Stehanji Vasi	Trebnje
Male Dole pri Temenici	Ivančna Gorica
Male Dole	Vojnik
Male Grahovše	Laško
Male Kompolje	Ivančna Gorica
Male Lašče	Velike Lašče
Male Lese	Ivančna Gorica
Male Lipljene	Grosuplje
Male Loče	Ilirska Bistrica
Male Pece	Ivančna Gorica
Male Poljane	Škocjan
Male Rebrce	Ivančna Gorica
Male Rodne	Rogaška Slatina
Male Vinice	Sodražica
Male Vodenice	Krško
Male Vrhe	Ivančna Gorica
Male Žablje	Ajdovščina
Malečnik	Maribor
Malence	Krško
Malenska vas	Mirna Peč
Malenski Vrh	Gorenja vas-Poljane
Mali Ban	Šentjernej
Mali Brebrovnik	Ormož
Mali Breg	Slovenske Konjice
Mali Cerovec	Novo mesto
Mali Cirnik pri Šentjanžu	Trebnje
Mali Cirnik	Brežice
Mali Dol	Komen
Mali Dol	Pesnica
Mali Gaber	Trebnje
Mali Hrib	Kamnik
Mali Jelnik	Lukovica
Mali Kal	Ivančna Gorica
Mali Kal	Mirna Peč
Mali Kamen	Krško
Mali Konec	Grosuplje
Mali Koren	Krško
Mali Korinj	Ivančna Gorica
Mali Kum	Zagorje ob Savi
Mali Lipoglav	Ljubljana
Mali Lipovec	Žužemberk
Mali Ločnik	Velike Lašče
Mali Log	Loški Potok
Mali Moravščak	Sveti Jurij ob Ščavnici
Mali Nerajec	Črnomelj
Mali Obrež	Brežice
Mali Okič	Gorišnica
Mali Orehek	Novo mesto
Mali Osolnik	Velike Lašče
Mali Otok	Postojna
Mali Podljuben	Novo mesto
Mali Podlog	Krško
Mali Rakitovec	Kamnik
Mali Rigelj	Dolenjske Toplice
Mali Slatnik	Novo mesto
Mali Trn	Krško
Mali Videm	Trebnje
Mali Vrh pri Prežganju	Ljubljana
Mali Vrh pri Šmarju	Grosuplje
Mali Vrh	Brežice
Mali Vrh	Mirna Peč
Mali Vrh	Šmartno ob Paki
Malija	Izola
Maline pri Štrekljevcu	Semič
Maline	Trebnje
Malinišče	Osilnica
Malkovec	Sevnica
Malna	Lenart
Malni	Bloke
Malo Črnelo	Ivančna Gorica
Malo Globoko	Ivančna Gorica
Malo Hudo	Ivančna Gorica
Malo Lešče	Metlika
Malo Lipje	Žužemberk
Malo Mlačevo	Grosuplje
Malo Mraševo	Krško
Malo Naklo	Naklo
Malo Polje	Ajdovščina
Malo Tinje	Slovenska Bistrica
Malo Trebeljevo	Ljubljana
Malo Ubeljsko	Postojna
Malovše	Ajdovščina
Mamolj	Litija
Manče	Vipava
Manžan	Koper
Marezige	Koper
Maribor	Maribor
Marija Dobje	Šentjur
Marija Gradec	Laško
Marija Reka	Prebold
Marijina vas	Laško
Marinča vas	Ivančna Gorica
Marinčki	Velike Lašče
Marindol	Črnomelj
Marjeta na Dravskem Polju	Starše
Markečica	Oplotnica
Markišavci	Murska Sobota
Markovci	Markovci
Markovci	Šalovci
Markovec	Loška Dolina
Markovo	Kamnik
Markovščina	Hrpelje-Kozina
Marno	Hrastnik
Marolče	Ribnica
Maršiči	Koper
Maršiči	Ribnica
Martinj Vrh	Železniki
Martinja vas pri Mokronogu	Trebnje
Martinja vas	Trebnje
Martinjak	Cerknica
Martinje	Gornji Petrovci
Martinuči	Nova Gorica
Martjanci	Moravske Toplice
Masore	Idrija
Mašelj	Semič
Matavun	Divača
Matena	Ig
Matenja vas	Postojna
Materija	Hrpelje-Kozina
Matjaševci	Kuzma
Matke	Prebold
Mavčiče	Kranj
Mavrc	Kostel
Mavrlen	Črnomelj
Medana	Brda
Medija	Zagorje ob Savi
Medlog	Celje
Medno	Ljubljana
Medribnik	Gorišnica
Medvedce	Majšperk
Medvedica	Grosuplje
Medvedje Brdo	Logatec
Medvedjek	Trebnje
Medvedjek	Velike Lašče
Medvode	Medvode
Meglenik	Trebnje
Meja	Kranj
Meje	Gorišnica
Mekinje nad Stično	Ivančna Gorica
Mekinje	Kamnik
Mekotnjak	Ljutomer
Melanjski Vrh	Radenci
Mele	Gornja Radgona
Melinci	Beltinci
Meliše	Ljubno
Meljski Hrib	Maribor
Mengeš	Mengeš
Meniška vas	Dolenjske Toplice
Merče	Sežana
Mereče	Ilirska Bistrica
Merljaki	Nova Gorica
Mestinje	Šmarje pri Jelšah
Mestni Vrh	Ptuj
Metava	Maribor
Metlika	Metlika
Metnaj	Ivančna Gorica
Metni Vrh	Sevnica
Metulje	Bloke
Mevce	Ivančna Gorica
Mevkuž	Bled
Mezgovci ob Pesnici	Dornava
Mezgovci	Ormož
Mežica	Mežica
Migojnice	Žalec
Migolica	Mirna
Migolska Gora	Mirna
Mihalovci	Ormož
Mihalovec	Brežice
Mihelca	Litija
Mihele	Hrpelje-Kozina
Mihelja vas	Črnomelj
Mihovce	Kidričevo
Mihovci pri Veliki Nedelji	Ormož
Mihovec	Novo mesto
Mihovica	Šentjernej
Mihovo	Šentjernej
Miklarji	Črnomelj
Miklavž na Dravskem Polju	Miklavž na Dravskem polju
Miklavž pri Ormožu	Ormož
Miklavž pri Taboru	Tabor (občina)
Mikote	Krško
Milava	Cerknica
Miliči	Črnomelj
Milje	Šenčur
Miren	Miren-Kostanjevica
Mirke	Vrhnika
Mirna Peč	Mirna Peč
Mirna vas	Trebnje
Mirna	Mirna
Mirtoviči	Osilnica
Misliče	Divača
Mislinja	Mislinja
Mislinjska Dobrava	Slovenj Gradec
Mišače	Radovljica
Mišji Dol	Litija
Mlače	Slovenske Konjice
Mladica	Semič
Mladje	Krško
Mlajtinci	Moravske Toplice
Mlaka nad Lušo	Gorenja vas-Poljane
Mlaka pri Kočevju	Kočevje
Mlaka pri Kočevski Reki	Kočevje
Mlaka pri Kranju	Kranj
Mlaka	Komenda
Mlaka	Radovljica
Mlake	Metlika
Mlake	Muta
Mleščevo	Ivančna Gorica
Mlinsko	Kobarid
Mlinše	Zagorje ob Savi
Močile	Črnomelj
Močilno	Radeče
Močle	Šmarje pri Jelšah
Močna	Lenart
Močunigi	Koper
Močvirje	Škocjan
Modraže	Slovenska Bistrica
Modrej	Tolmin
Modrejce	Tolmin
Modrič	Laško
Modrič	Slovenska Bistrica
Mohorini	Nova Gorica
Mohorje	Velike Lašče
Mojstrana	Kranjska Gora
Mokri Potok	Kočevje
Mokronog	Trebnje
Montinjan	Koper
Morava	Kočevje
Moravci v Slovenskih Goricah	Ljutomer
Moravče pri Gabrovki	Litija
Moravče	Moravče
Moravske Toplice	Moravske Toplice
Moravška Gora	Litija
Morje	Rače-Fram
Morsko	Kanal
Most na Soči	Tolmin
Most	Trebnje
Moste	Komenda
Moste	Žirovnica
Mostec	Brežice
Mostečno	Slovenska Bistrica
Mostje	Juršinci
Mostje	Lendava
Moščanci	Puconci
Moše	Medvode
Mošenik	Moravče
Mošenik	Zagorje ob Savi
Moškanjci	Gorišnica
Moškrin	Škofja Loka
Mošnje	Radovljica
Mota	Ljutomer
Motnik	Kamnik
Motovilci	Grad
Motvarjevci	Moravske Toplice
Moverna vas	Semič
Movraž	Koper
Mozelj	Kočevje
Mozirje	Mozirje
Možjanca	Preddvor
Mramorovo pri Lužarjih	Bloke
Mramorovo pri Pajkovem	Bloke
Mrčna Sela	Krško
Mrše	Hrpelje-Kozina
Mršeča vas	Šentjernej
Mrtovec	Sevnica
Mrtvice	Kočevje
Mrtvice	Krško
Mrzla Luža	Trebnje
Mrzla Planina	Sevnica
Mrzlava vas	Brežice
Mrzli Log	Idrija
Mrzli Vrh	Idrija
Mrzli Vrh	Žiri
Mrzlo Polje	Ivančna Gorica
Mrzlo Polje	Laško
Muha vas	Kočevje
Muhabran	Trebnje
Mulhe	Litija
Muljava	Ivančna Gorica
Murave	Gorenja vas-Poljane
Muretinci	Gorišnica
Murska Sobota	Murska Sobota
Murski Črnci	Tišina (občina)
Murski Petrovci	Tišina (občina)
Murski Vrh	Radenci
Murščak	Radenci
Muta	Muta
