= Brode, Moravče =

Brode
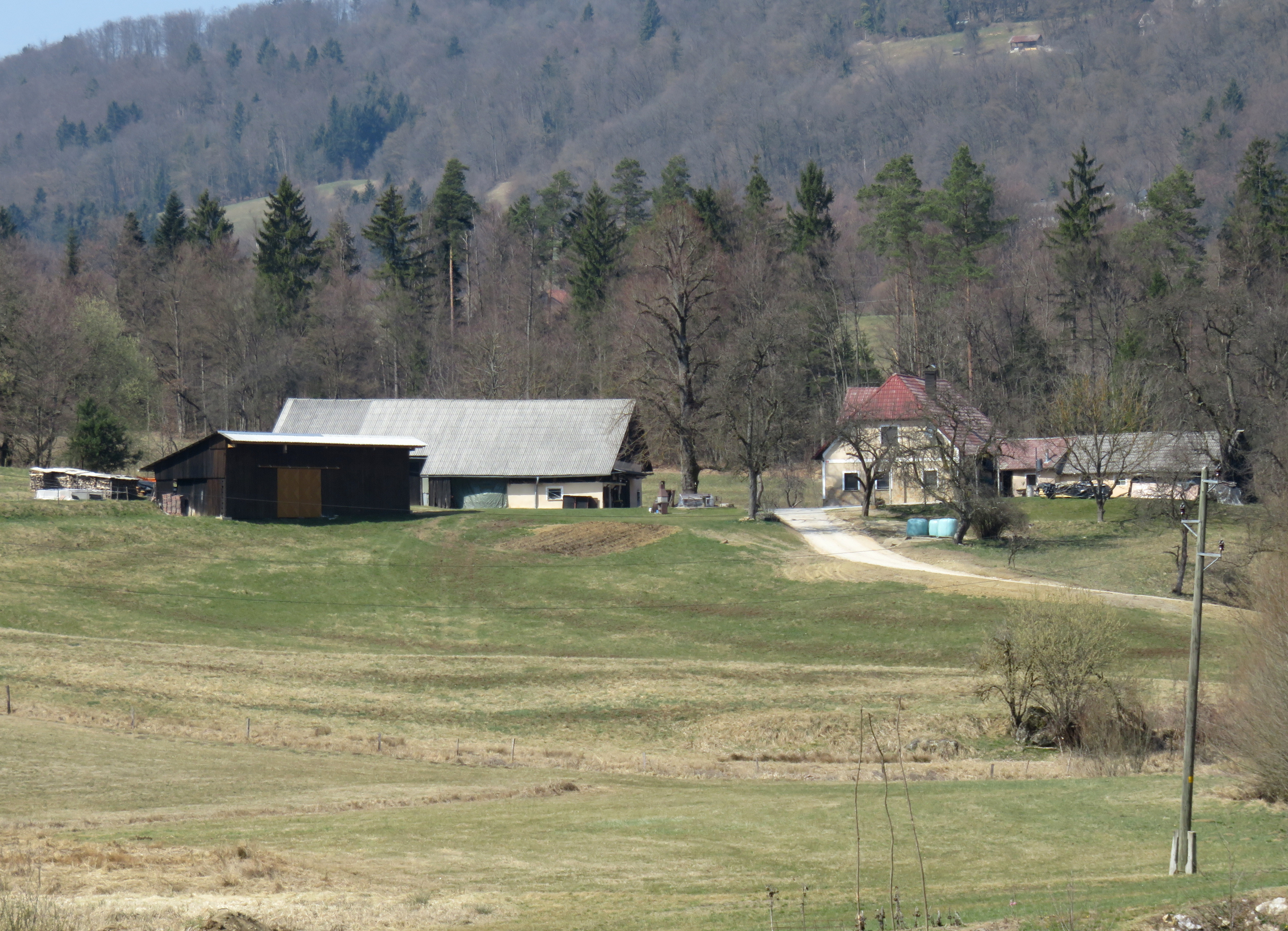

- Location in Slovenia
- Coordinates: 46°8′28″N 14°46′42″E
- Country: Slovenia
- Traditional region: Upper Carniola
- Statistical region: Central Slovenia
- Municipality: Moravče
- Elevation: 398 m (1,306 ft)

Brode (Slovene pronunciation: [ˈbɾoːdɛ]) is a former settlement in the Municipality of Moravče in central Slovenia. It is now part of the village of Mošenik. The area is part of the traditional region of Upper Carniola. The municipality is now included in the Central Slovenia Statistical Region.

== Geography ==
Brode lies in the southwestern part of the village of Mošenik, in a wooded area south of the main part of the village and west of Mošeniščnica Creek.

== History ==
Brode had a population of five living in one house in 1900. Brode was annexed by Mošenik in 1953, ending its existence as an independent settlement.
