= Mali Lipovec =

Mali Lipovec may refer to:

- Mali Lipovec, Žužemberk, a village in Slovenia
- Mali Lipovec, Croatia, a village near Samobor
