= Hudej =

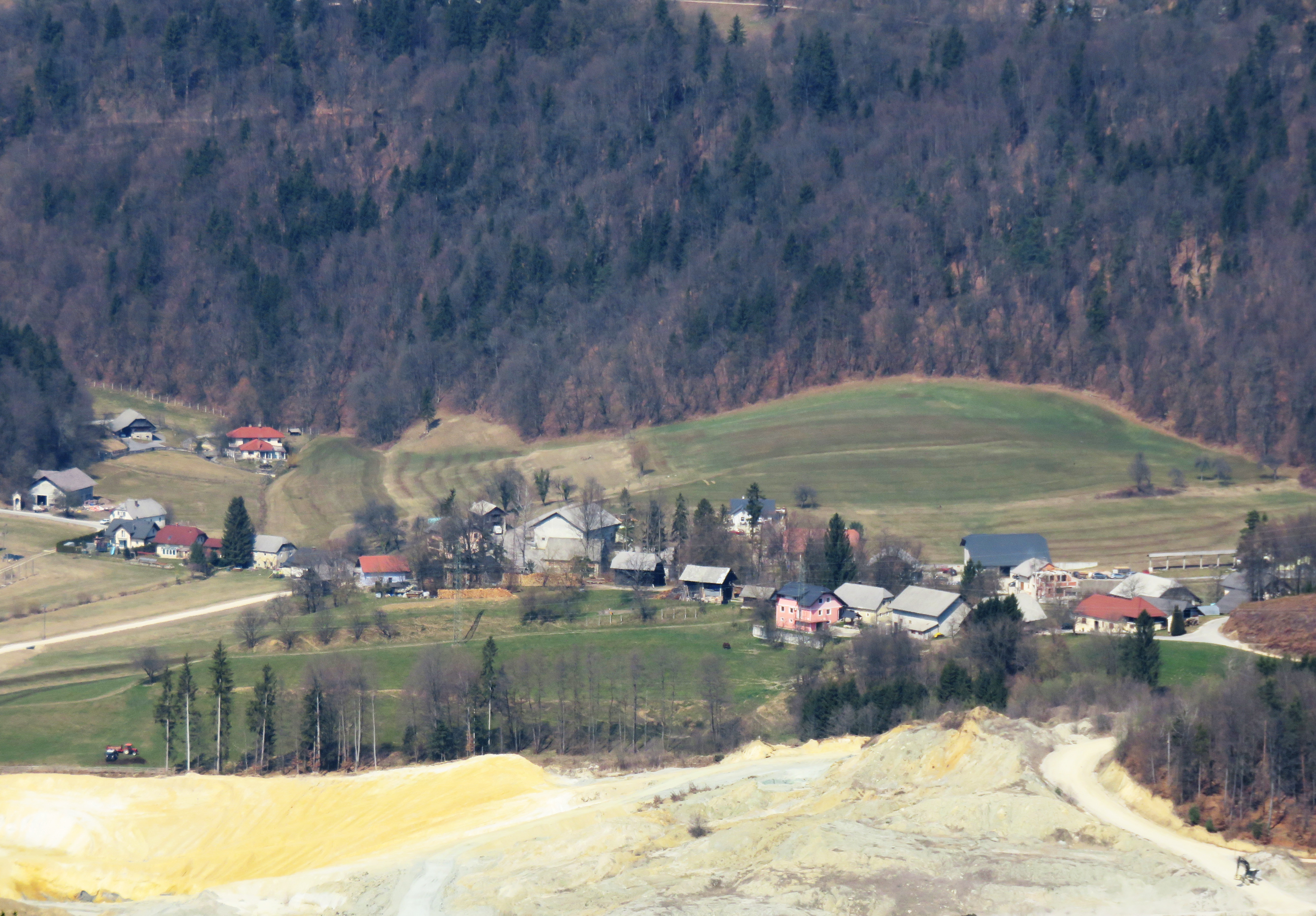

- Location in Slovenia
- Coordinates: 46°8′38″N 14°47′02″E
- Country: Slovenia
- Traditional region: Upper Carniola
- Statistical region: Central Slovenia
- Municipality: Moravče
- Elevation: 423 m (1,388 ft)

Hudej (Slovene pronunciation: [huˈdeːi̯]) is a former settlement in the Municipality of Moravče in central Slovenia. It is now part of the village of Mošenik. The area is part of the traditional region of Upper Carniola. The municipality is now included in the Central Slovenia Statistical Region.

== Geography ==
Hudej lies in the southern part of the village of Mošenik, southeast of the main part of the settlement and east of Mošeniščnica Creek. A large pit where diatomaceous earth is extracted lies southeast of Hudej.

== History ==
Hudej had a population of 20 living in three houses in 1900. Hudej was annexed by Mošenik in 1953, ending its existence as an independent settlement.
