= Dolnje Prapreče =

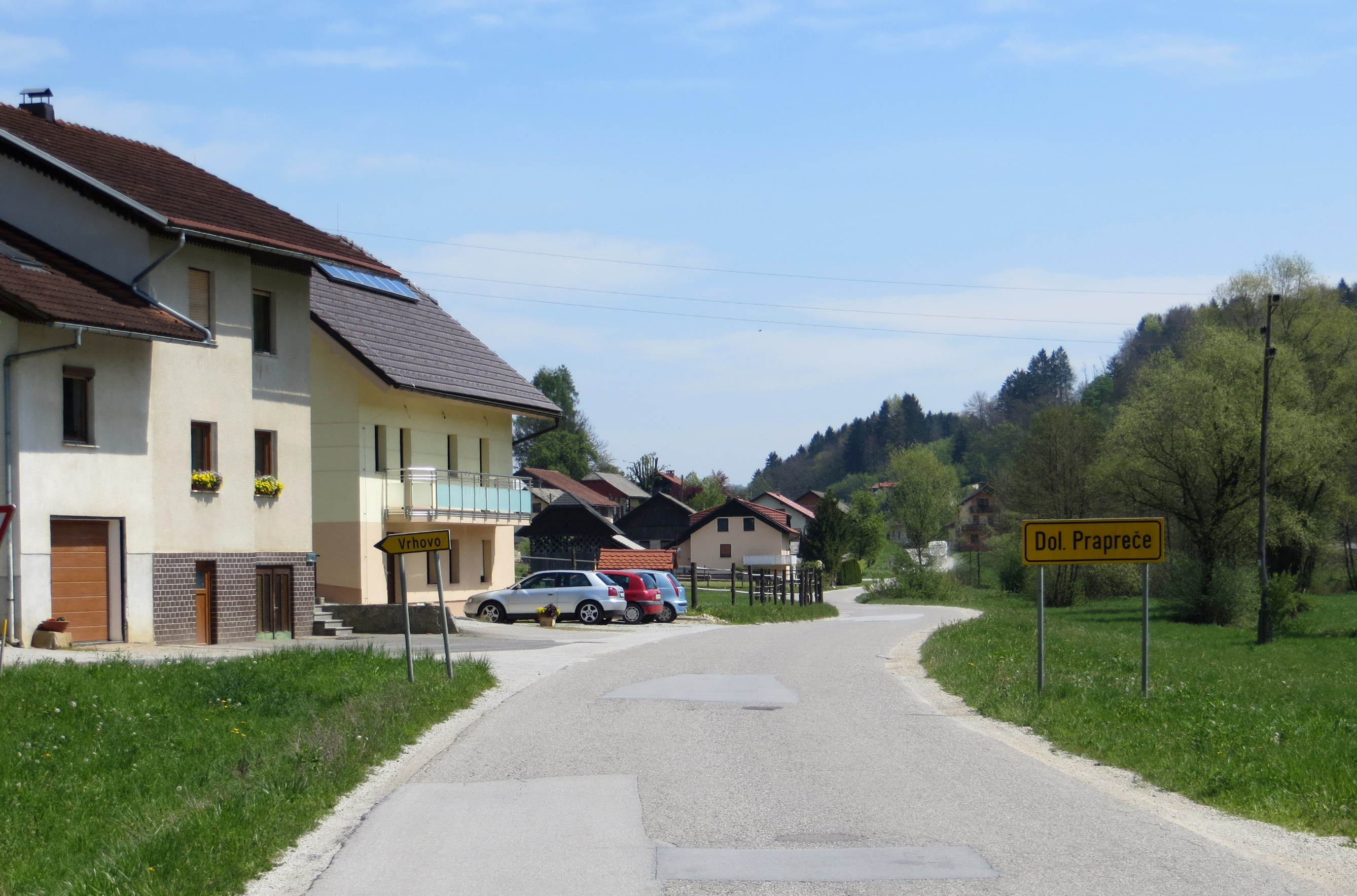

- Location in Slovenia
- Coordinates: 45°56′22.9″N 14°56′19.44″E
- Country: Slovenia
- Traditional region: Lower Carniola
- Statistical region: Southeast Slovenia
- Municipality: Trebnje

Area
  - Total: 0.58 km^{2} (0.22 sq mi)
- Elevation: 312.4 m (1,025 ft)

Population (2002)
  - Total: 67

Dolnje Prapreče (pronounced [ˈdoːlnjɛ ˈpɾaːpɾɛtʃɛ]; in older sources also Dolenje Prapreče, German: Unterprapretsche) is a small settlement west of Šentlovrenc in the Municipality of Trebnje in eastern Slovenia. The area is part of the historical region of Lower Carniola. The municipality is now included in the Southeast Slovenia Statistical Region.

A section of the Roman road from Emona to Siscia and Roman graves were found at a site near the settlement.
