= Brezovica, Velika Polana =

Brezovica Lendvanyíres
- Location in Slovenia
- Coordinates: 46°35′39.42″N 16°20′5.63″E
- Country: Slovenia
- Traditional region: Prekmurje
- Statistical region: Mura
- Municipality: Velika Polana

Area
  - Total: 3.1 km^{2} (1.2 sq mi)
- Elevation: 166.9 m (548 ft)

Population (2002)
  - Total: 217

Brezovica (pronounced [ˈbɾéːzɔʋitsa]; Hungarian: Lendvanyíres) is a village north of Velika Polana in the Prekmurje region of Slovenia.
