= Muhabran =

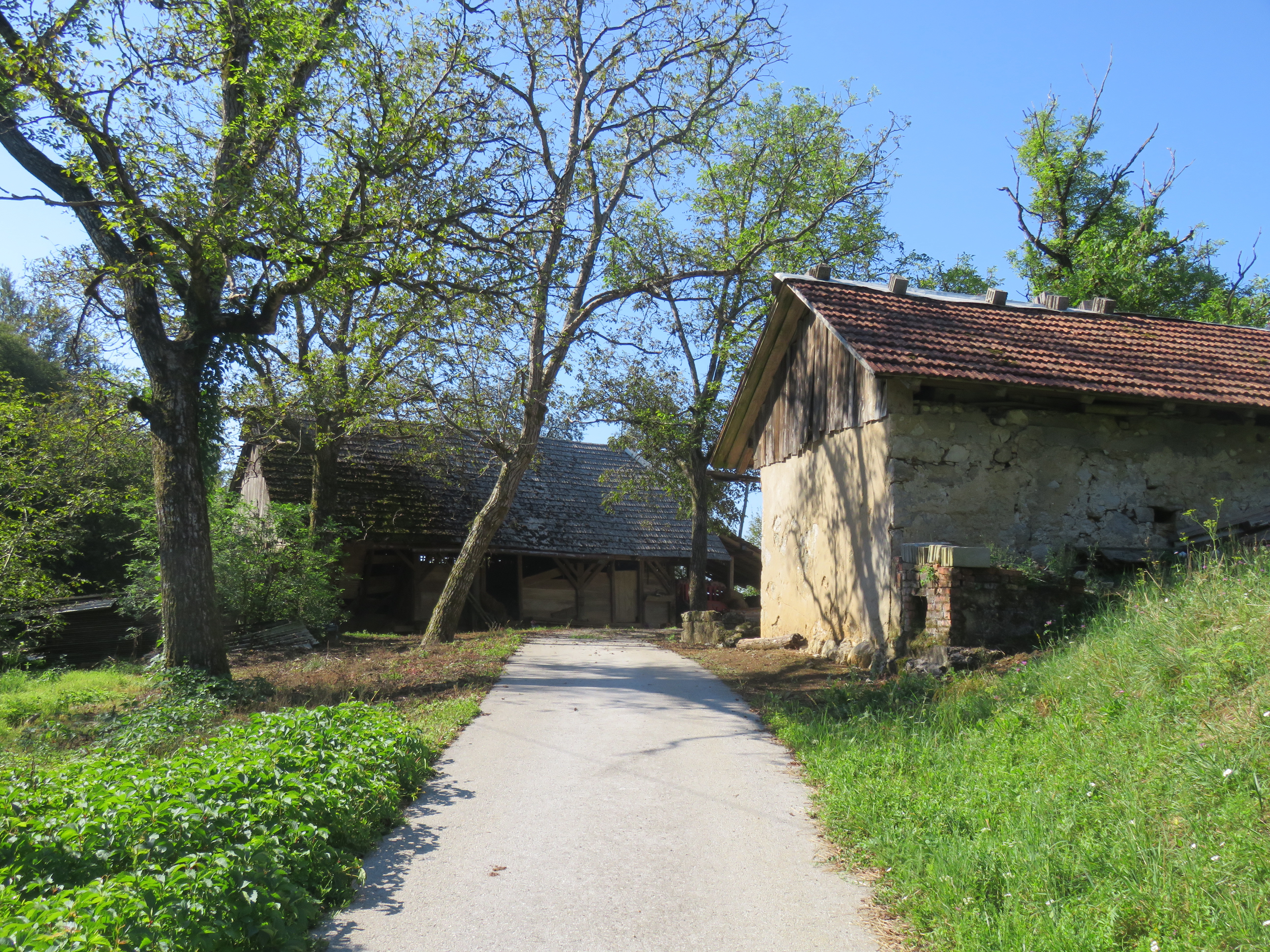

- Location in Slovenia
- Coordinates: 45°56′7.38″N 14°57′0.77″E
- Country: Slovenia
- Traditional region: Lower Carniola
- Statistical region: Southeast Slovenia
- Municipality: Trebnje

Area
  - Total: 0.2 km^{2} (0.077 sq mi)
- Elevation: 361.6 m (1,186 ft)

Population (2002)
  - Total: 15

Muhabran (pronounced [ˈmuːxabɾan]) is a small dispersed settlement just south of Šentlovrenc in the Municipality of Trebnje in eastern Slovenia. The area is part of the traditional region of Lower Carniola and is now included in the Southeast Slovenia Statistical Region.

== Name ==
The name Muhabran literally means 'fighting flies'. Muhabran was attested in historical documents as Muhaber in 1780 and Muchabran in 1825. Like the related Slovenian toponym Muhaber (literally, 'gathering flies'), the name is a relatively recent toponymization of a jocular nickname (*Muhobrani 'fly fighters') for the residents of the village.
