= Mala Loka, Trebnje =

Mala Loka
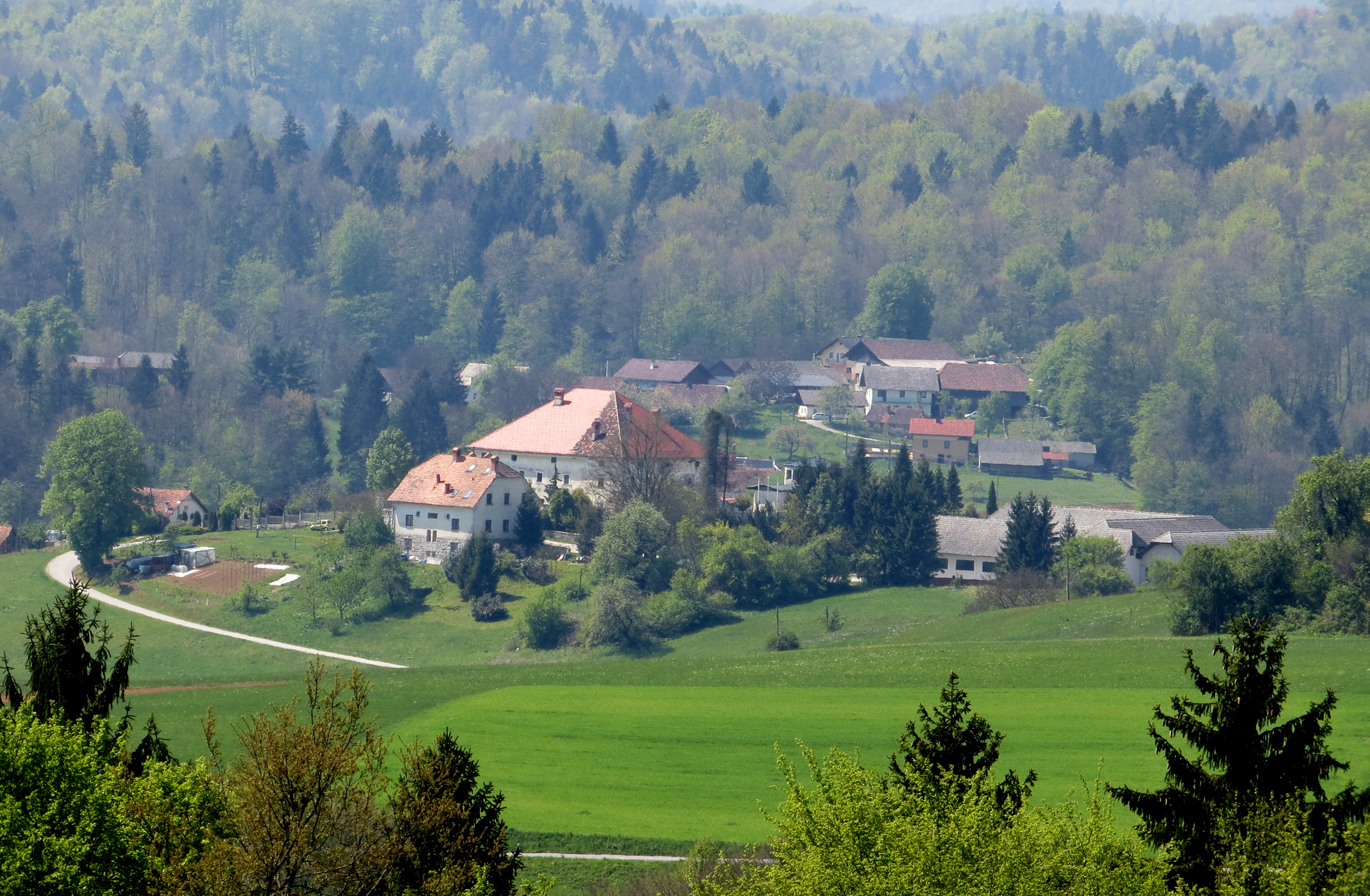

- Location in Slovenia
- Coordinates: 45°56′32.99″N 14°57′56.93″E
- Country: Slovenia
- Traditional region: Lower Carniola
- Statistical region: Southeast Slovenia
- Municipality: Trebnje

Area
  - Total: 0.84 km^{2} (0.32 sq mi)
- Elevation: 322.7 m (1,059 ft)

Population (2002)
  - Total: 60

Mala Loka (pronounced [ˈmaːla ˈloːka]) is a settlement in the Municipality of Trebnje in eastern Slovenia. It lies north of Velika Loka and east of Šentlovrenc. The area is part of the historical region of Lower Carniola. The municipality is now included in the Southeast Slovenia Statistical Region.

A mansion west of the settlement on a small hill above the left bank of the Temenica River dates to the 16th century. A contemporary chapel next to the main building was extended and remodelled by Ivan Vurnik in the 1930s.
