= Kukenberk =

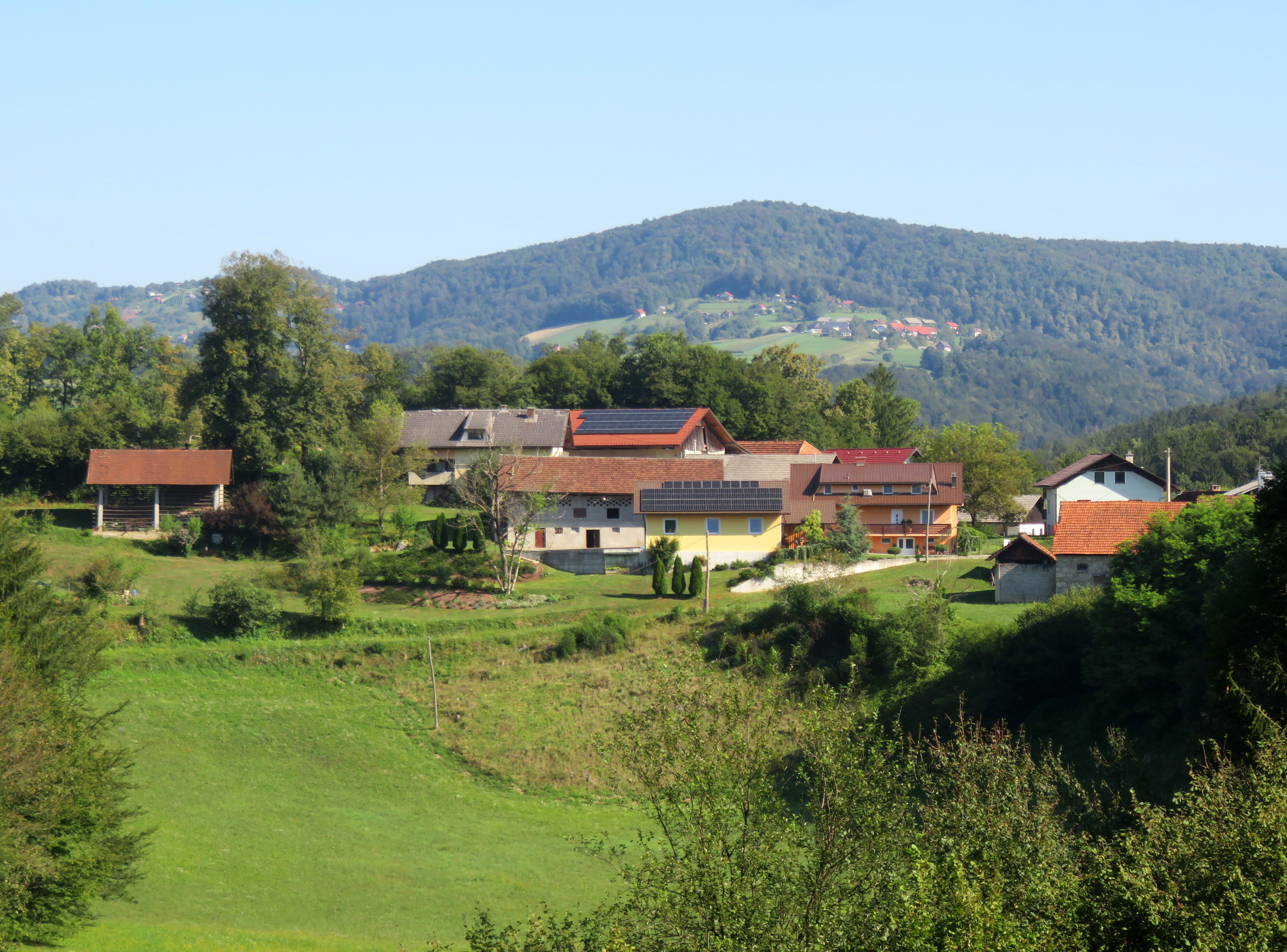

- Location in Slovenia
- Coordinates: 45°56′16.45″N 14°57′17.94″E
- Country: Slovenia
- Traditional region: Lower Carniola
- Statistical region: Southeast Slovenia
- Municipality: Trebnje

Area
  - Total: 0.34 km^{2} (0.13 sq mi)
- Elevation: 322.2 m (1,057 ft)

Population (2002)
  - Total: 28

Kukenberk (pronounced [ˈkuːkəmbɛɾk]) is a small settlement on the right bank of the Temenica River east of Šentlovrenc in the Municipality of Trebnje in Slovenia. The municipality is included in the Southeast Slovenia Statistical Region. The entire area is part of the historical region of Lower Carniola.
