= Velika Loka, Trebnje =

Velika Loka
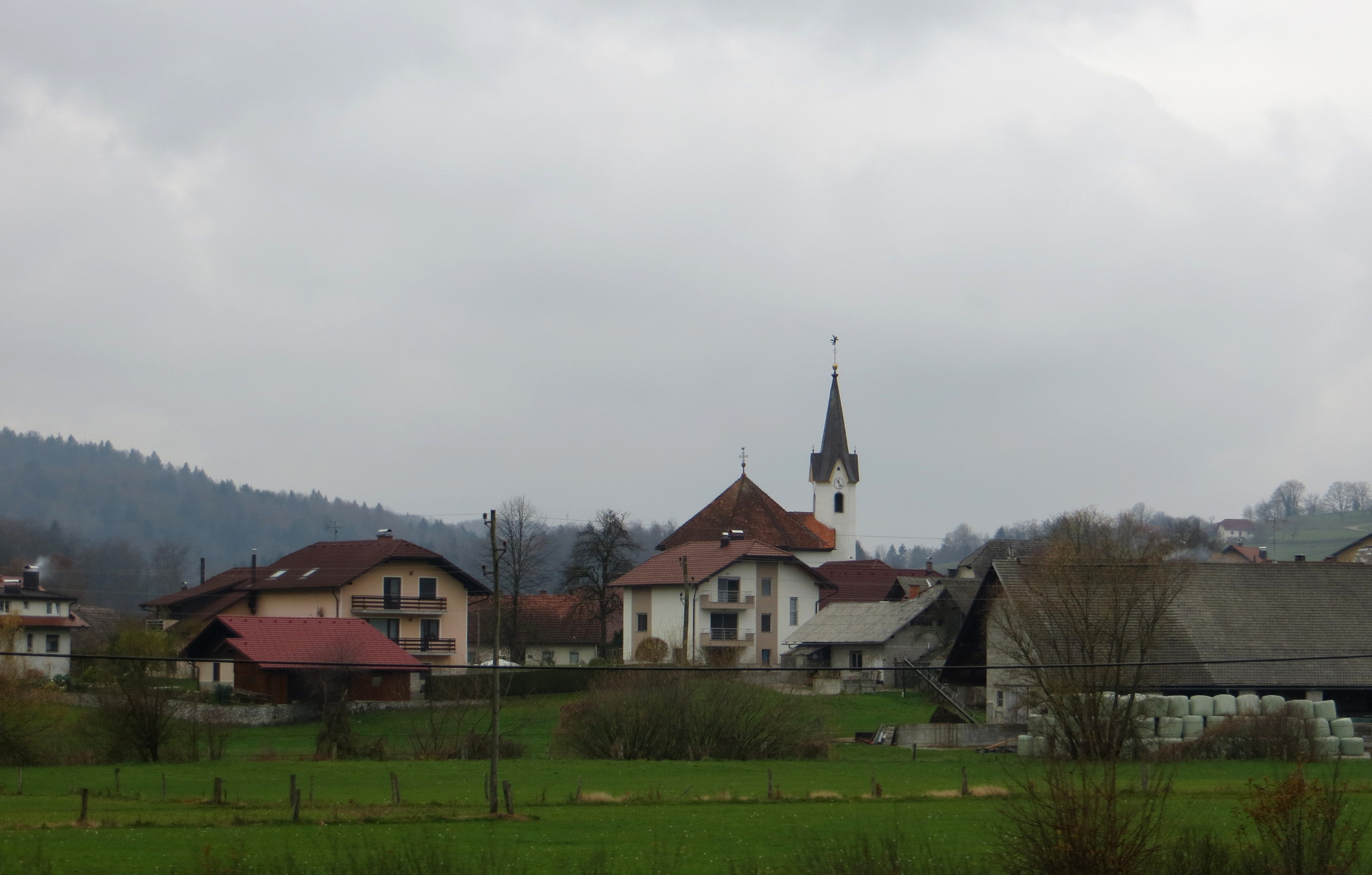

- Location in Slovenia
- Coordinates: 45°55′49.58″N 14°58′4.38″E
- Country: Slovenia
- Traditional region: Lower Carniola
- Statistical region: Southeast Slovenia
- Municipality: Trebnje

Area
  - Total: 4.16 km^{2} (1.61 sq mi)
- Elevation: 279.1 m (916 ft)

Population (2002)
  - Total: 329

Velika Loka (pronounced [ˈʋeːlika ˈloːka]) is a village in the Municipality of Trebnje in eastern Slovenia. It lies on the Temenica River northwest of Trebnje, just off the old regional road leading to Ivančna Gorica. The area is part of the traditional region of Lower Carniola. The municipality is now included in the Southeast Slovenia Statistical Region.

The local church is dedicated to Saint James (Slovene: sveti Jakob) and belongs to the Parish of Šentlovrenc. It was first mentioned in written sources dating to 1581, but was greatly modified in the 18th century.
