= Muhaber =

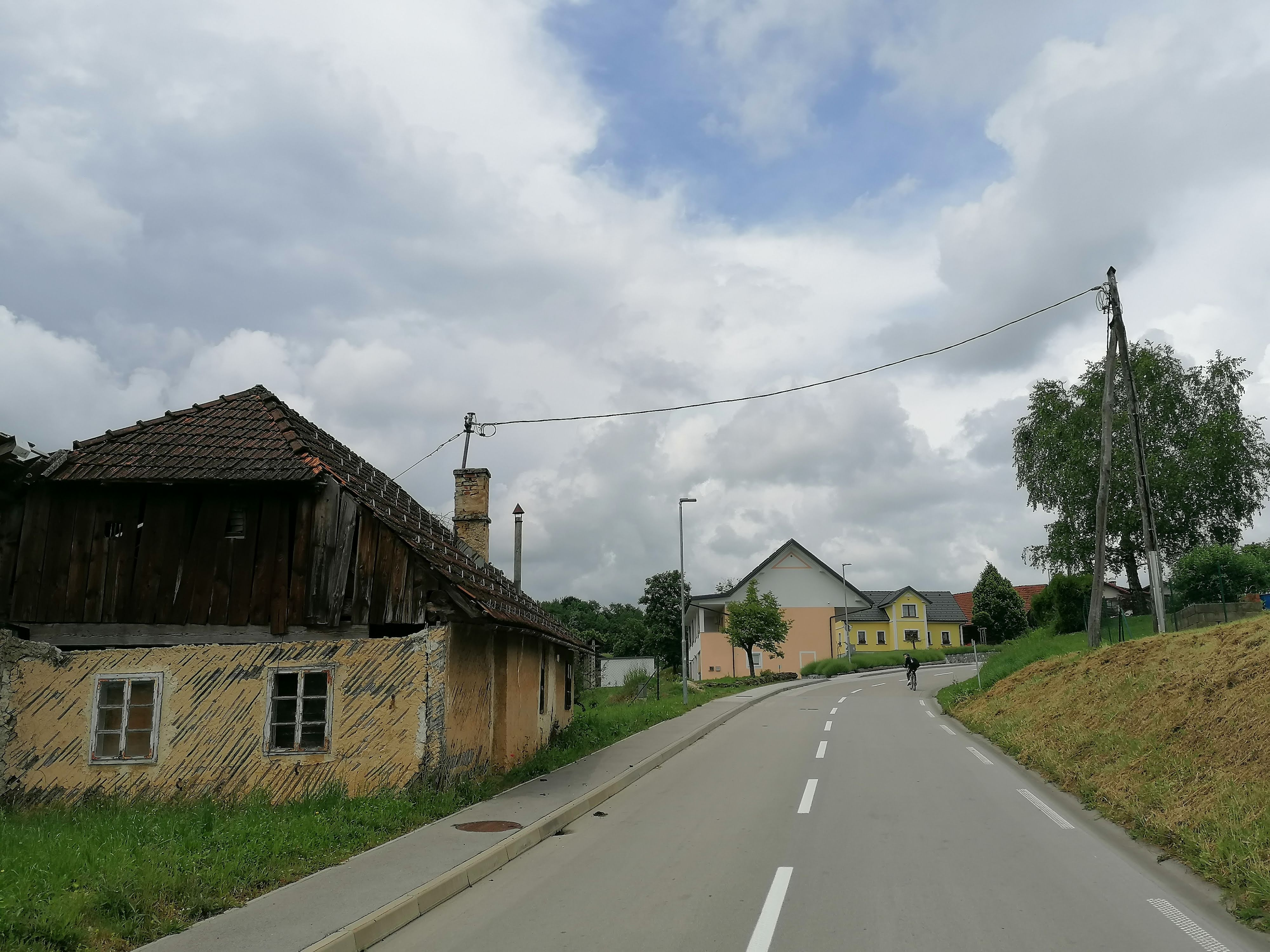

- Location in Slovenia
- Coordinates: 45°49′20″N 15°08′42″E
- Country: Slovenia
- Traditional region: Lower Carniola
- Statistical region: Southwest Slovenia
- Municipality: Novo Mesto
- Elevation: 206 m (676 ft)

Muhaber (pronounced [ˈmuːxabɛɾ], in older sources also Muhober, German: Muchaber) is a former village in southeastern Slovenia in the Municipality of Novo Mesto. It is now part of the city of Novo Mesto. It is part of the traditional region of Lower Carniola and is now included in the Southeast Slovenia Statistical Region.

== Geography ==
Muhaber is a scattered settlement on a terrace above the railway line from Ljubljana to Metlika. Žabjek Hill, covered with mixed forest, rises to the west, and there is a Roma settlement to the northwest.

== Name ==
The name Muhaber literally means 'gathering flies'. Muhaber was attested in historical documents as Muhober and Muhoberi in 1780. Like the related Slovenian toponym Muhabran (literally, 'fighting flies'), the name is a relatively recent toponymization of a jocular nickname (*Muhoberi 'fly gatherers') for the residents of the village.

== History ==
Archeological investigations have discovered a Hallstatt culture cemetery in Muhaber with cremation burials as well as a Roman cemetery, testifying to early settlement in the area. Muhaber was annexed by the city of Novo Mesto in 1979, ending its existence as an independent settlement.
