= Miško Kranjec =

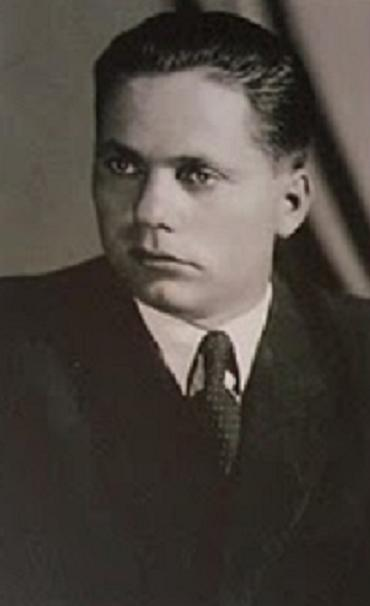
Miško Kranjec in the 1930s

Miško Kranjec (Hungarian: Krányecz Mihály) (September 15, 1908 – June 8, 1983), baptized Mihály Krányecz, was a Slovene writer.

== Life ==
Kranjec was born in the village of Velika Polana in what was then Zala County of the Kingdom of Hungary in the Austro-Hungarian Empire, as the son of the village tailor Mihalj Kranjec. When he was eleven years old, his native region of Prekmurje was incorporated into the Kingdom of Serbs, Croats and Slovenes and thus into Slovenia.

Kranjec studied Slavic philology at the University of Ljubljana. In the 1930s, he started writing his first short stories, following the emerging trend of social realism. He incorporated themes from his native Prekmurje region, which was a novelty back then. In Ljubljana, he became a journalist and a left-wing political activist. In 1941, just prior to the Axis invasion of Yugoslavia, Kranjec became a member of the Yugoslav Communist Party.

During World War II he collaborated with the Liberation Front of the Slovenian People. After the Communist takeover in 1945, he held several positions in the regime's cultural policy. In 1953, he became a member of the Slovenian Academy of Sciences and Arts.

He died in Ljubljana.

== Legacy ==
Among his many works, the best known are the collections of short stories entitled Povest o dobrih ljudeh (A Story about Good People) and Strici so mi povedali (As My Uncles Told Me).
