= Mala Sela, Črnomelj =

Mala Sela
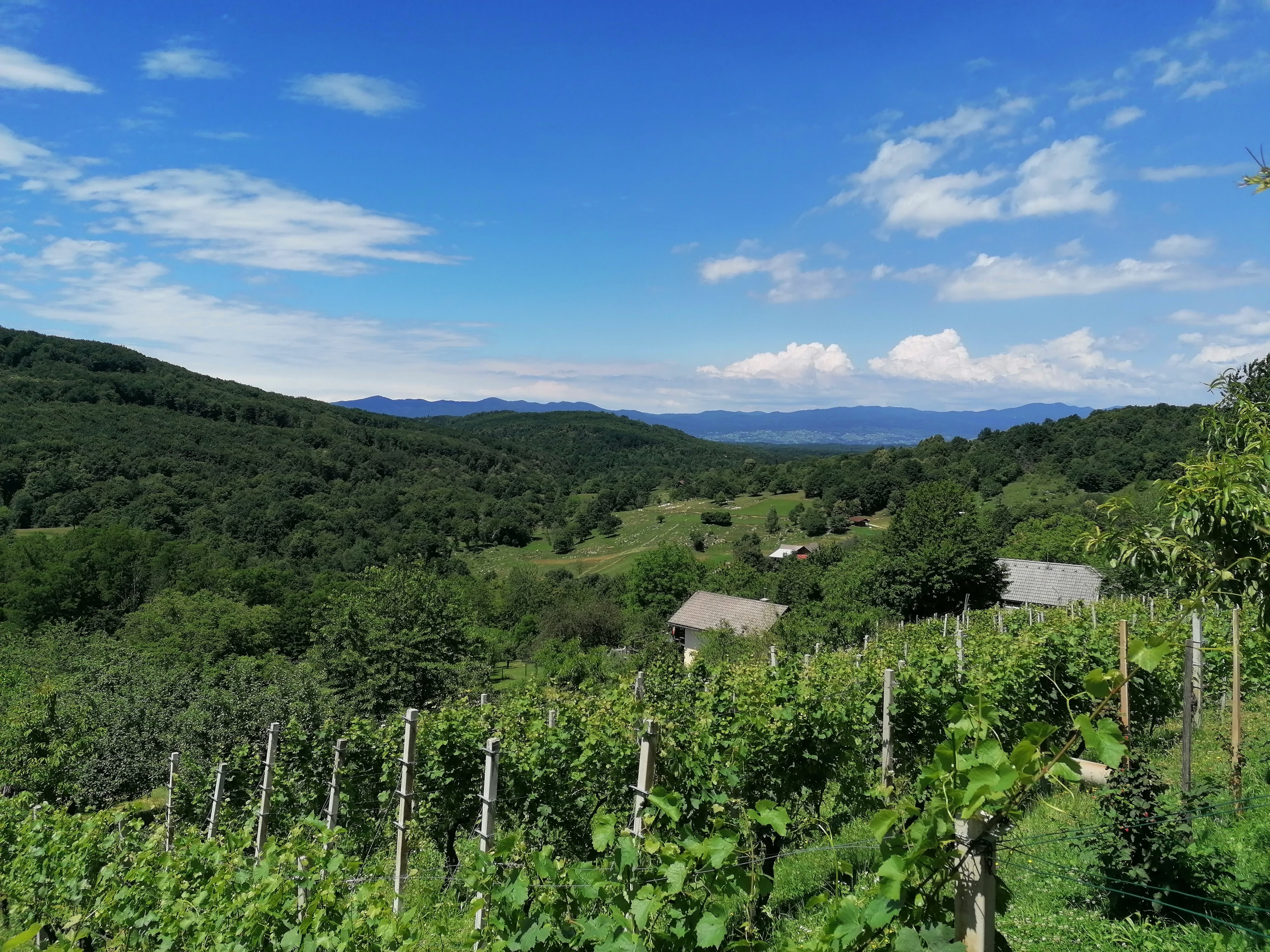

- Location in Slovenia
- Coordinates: 45°30′58.67″N 15°18′17.06″E
- Country: Slovenia
- Traditional region: White Carniola
- Statistical region: Southeast Slovenia
- Municipality: Črnomelj

Area
  - Total: 0.69 km^{2} (0.27 sq mi)
- Elevation: 268.2 m (880 ft)

Population (2020)
  - Total: 17
  - Density: 25/km^{2} (64/sq mi)
- Postal code: 8341

Mala Sela (pronounced [ˈmaːla ˈseːla]; Slovene: Mala sela, German: Kleinsela) is a settlement is a small settlement south of Adlešiči in the Municipality of Črnomelj in the White Carniola area of southeastern Slovenia. The area is part of the traditional region of Lower Carniola and is now included in the Southeast Slovenia Statistical Region.

== Name ==
The settlement was created in 1955 by dividing the former settlement of Sela into two parts: Mala Sela (Mala sela) and Velika Sela (Velika sela).
