= Mačkovec, Trebnje =

Mačkovec
- Location in Slovenia
- Coordinates: 45°57′4.08″N 14°57′54.59″E
- Country: Slovenia
- Traditional region: Lower Carniola
- Statistical region: Southeast Slovenia
- Municipality: Trebnje

Area
  - Total: 1.17 km^{2} (0.45 sq mi)
- Elevation: 329.3 m (1,080 ft)

Population (2002)
  - Total: 30

Mačkovec (pronounced [matʃˈkɔːʋəts] or [matʃˈkoːʋəts]) is a small village north of Velika Loka in the Municipality of Trebnje in eastern Slovenia. The municipality is included in the Southeast Slovenia Statistical Region. The entire area is part of the historical region of Lower Carniola.
