= Martinja Vas, Trebnje =

Martinja Vas
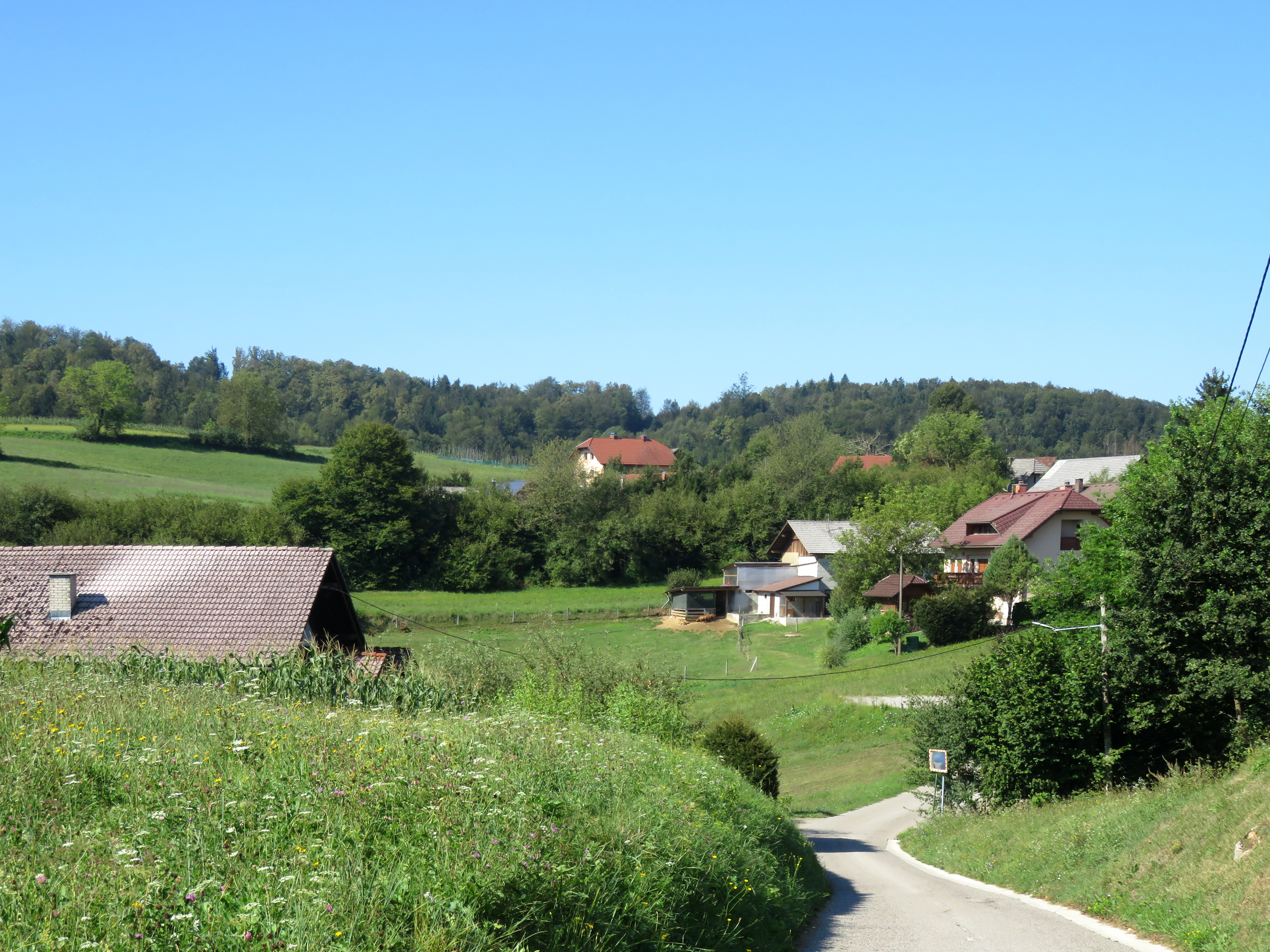

- Location in Slovenia
- Coordinates: 45°56′4.44″N 14°56′14.35″E
- Country: Slovenia
- Traditional region: Lower Carniola
- Statistical region: Southeast Slovenia
- Municipality: Trebnje

Area
  - Total: 1.98 km^{2} (0.76 sq mi)
- Elevation: 327.4 m (1,074 ft)

Population (2002)
  - Total: 101

Martinja Vas (pronounced [maɾˈtiːnja ˈʋaːs]; Slovene: Martinja vas, German: Martinsdorf) is a small village southwest of Šentlovrenc in the Municipality of Trebnje in eastern Slovenia. The area is part of the historical region of Lower Carniola. The municipality is now included in the Southeast Slovenia Statistical Region.

== Church ==
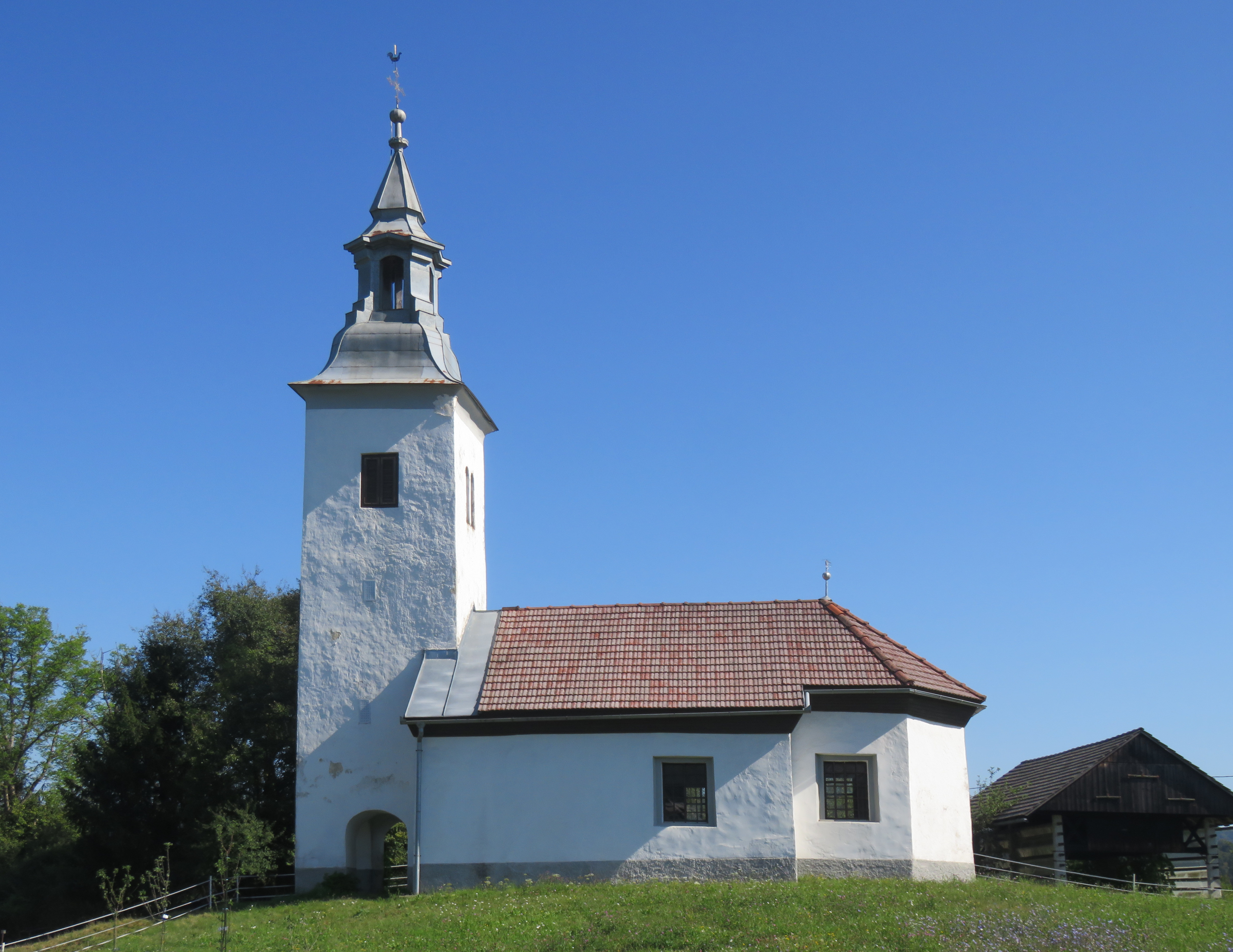
Saint Mary Magdalene Church

The local church is dedicated to Mary Magdalene and belongs to the Parish of Šentlovrenc. It is a Gothic building, first mentioned in written documents dating to 1526.
