= Sela, Litija =

Sela
- Location in Slovenia
- Coordinates: 46°6′42″N 14°48′49″E
- Country: Slovenia
- Traditional region: Upper Carniola
- Statistical region: Central Sava
- Municipality: Litija
- Elevation: 591 m (1,939 ft)

Sela (pronounced [ˈseːla]) is a former settlement in the Municipality of Litija in central Slovenia. It is now part of the village of Mala Sela. The area is part of the traditional region of Upper Carniola and is now included with the rest of the municipality in the Central Sava Statistical Region.

== Geography ==
Sela stands on a slope above the left bank of the Sava River along the road from Slivna to Zapodje.

== History ==
There were formerly two neighboring settlements: Sela and Mala Sela (literally, 'village' and 'little village'). Mala Sela was annexed by Sela in 1953 at the same time that Sela was defined as a separate settlement, and then in 1955 the name of the consolidated settlement was changed from Sela to Mala sela.
