= Municipality of Velika Polana =

Municipality of Slovenia

Municipality of Velika Polana Občina Velika Polana
- Municipality
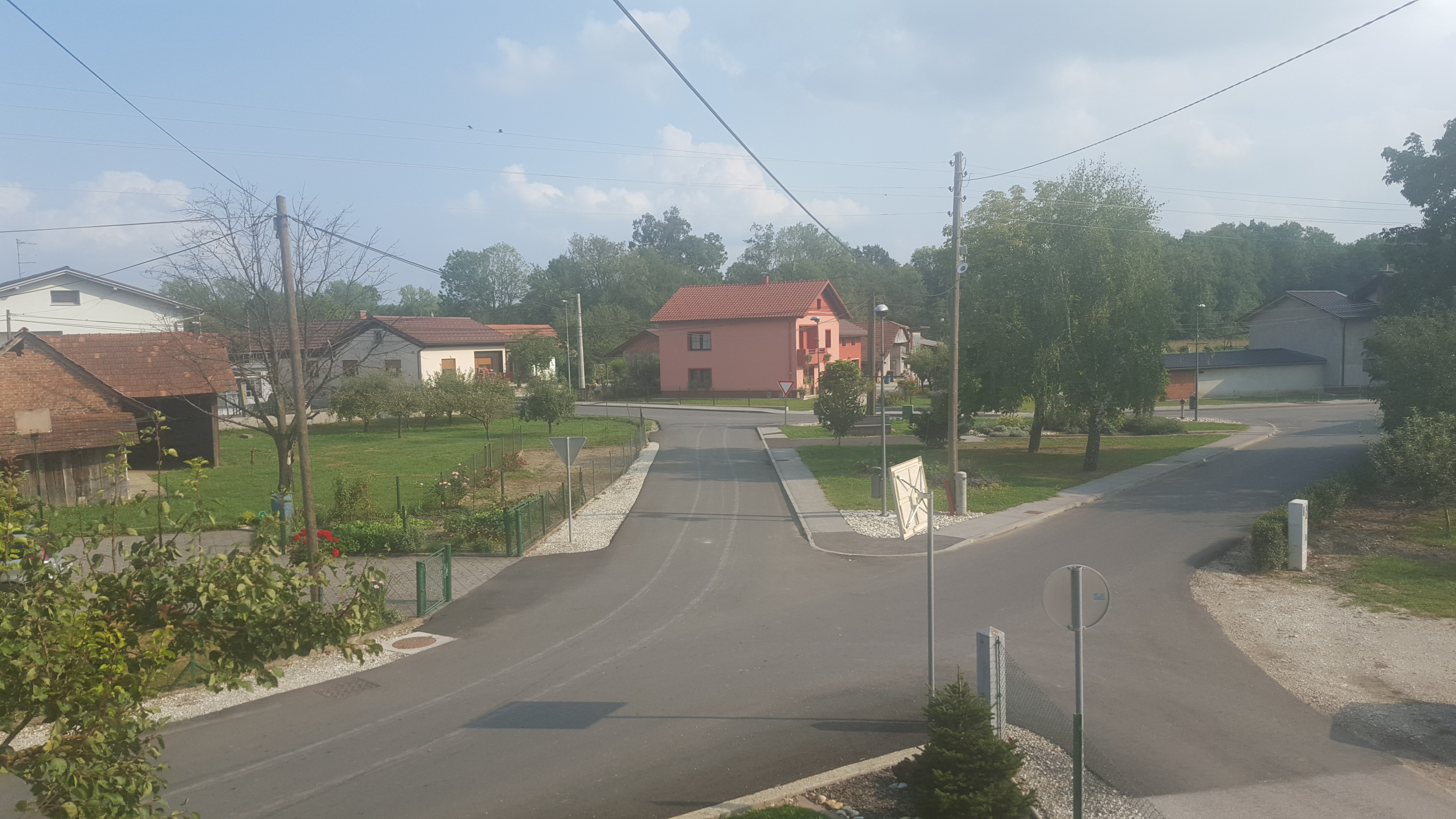

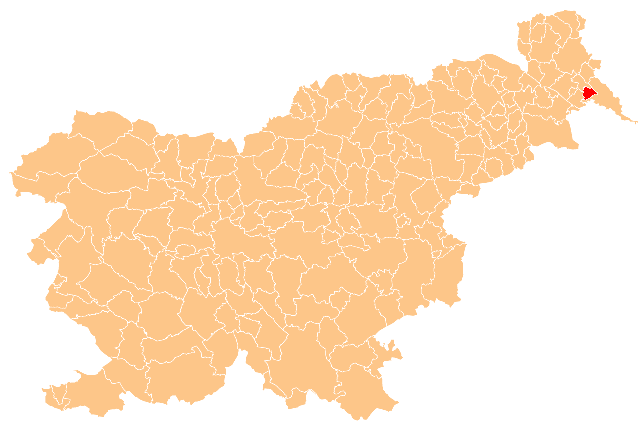
- Location of the Municipality of Velika Polana in Slovenia
- Coordinates: 46°35′N 16°21′E
- Country: Slovenia

Government
  - Mayor: Damijan Jaklin

Area
  - Total: 18.7 km^{2} (7.2 sq mi)

Population (July 1, 2018)
  - Total: 1,433
  - Density: 76.6/km^{2} (198/sq mi)
- Time zone: UTC+01 (CET)
  - Summer (DST): UTC+02 (CEST)
- Website: www.velika-polana.si

The Municipality of Velika Polana (pronounced [ˈʋeːlika ˈpoːlana]; Slovene: Občina Velika Polana) is a municipality in the traditional region of Prekmurje in northeastern Slovenia. The seat of the municipality is the town of Velika Polana. Velika Polana became a municipality in 1998.

== Settlements ==
In addition to the municipal seat of Velika Polana, the municipality also includes the settlements of Brezovica and Mala Polana.
