= Mala Polana =

Mala Polana Kispalina
- Location in Slovenia
- Coordinates: 46°34′35.74″N 16°21′44.11″E
- Country: Slovenia
- Traditional region: Prekmurje
- Statistical region: Mura
- Municipality: Velika Polana

Area
  - Total: 7.96 km^{2} (3.07 sq mi)
- Elevation: 164.8 m (541 ft)

Population (2002)
  - Total: 380

Mala Polana (pronounced [ˈmaːla ˈpoːlana]; Hungarian: Kispalina) is a village northeast of Velika Polana in the Prekmurje region of Slovenia. Črnec Creek, a tributary of the Ledava, flows past the settlement.
