= Mrzlo Polje, Ivančna Gorica =

Mrzlo Polje
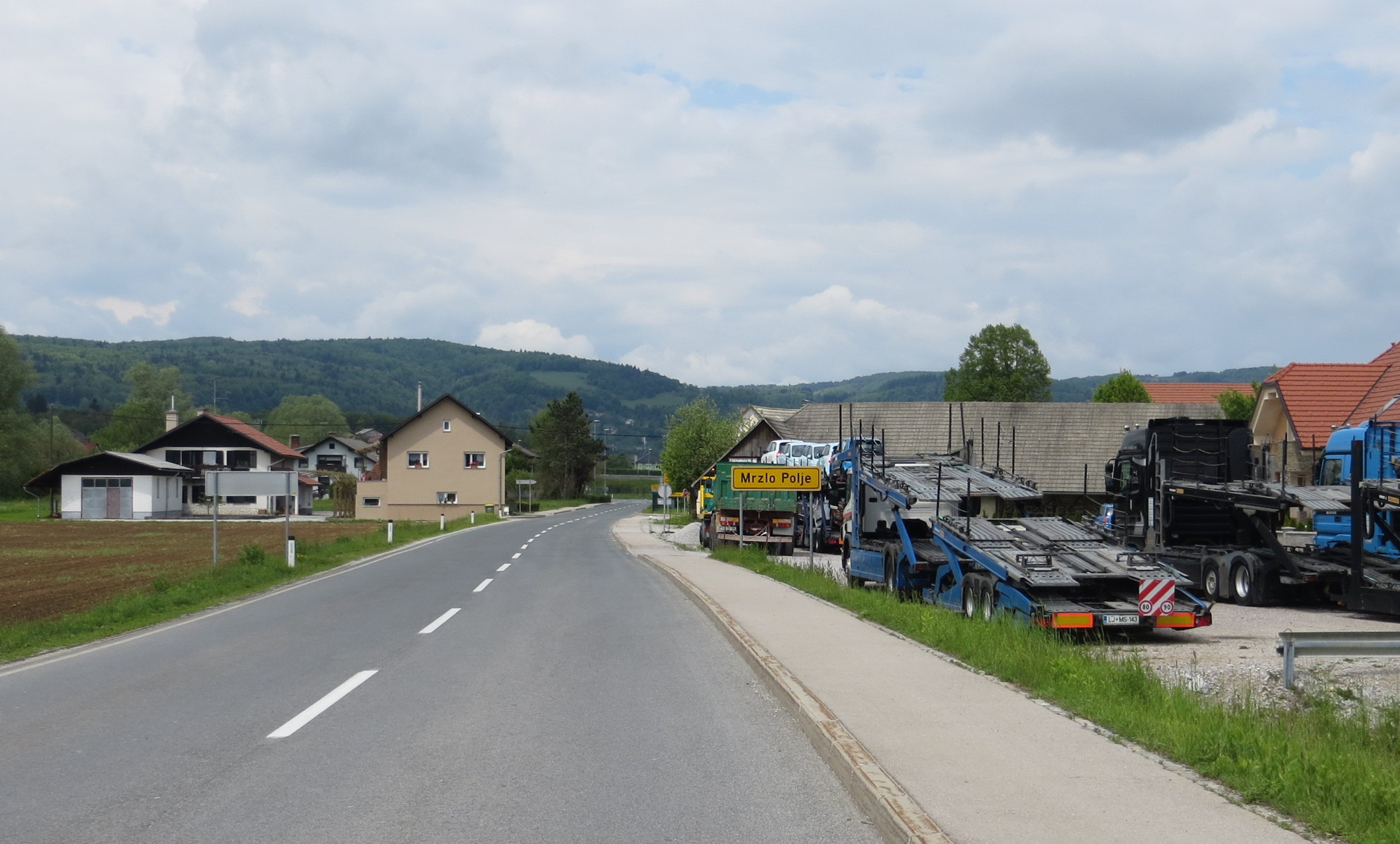

- Location in Slovenia
- Coordinates: 45°55′52.9″N 14°48′20.4″E
- Country: Slovenia
- Traditional region: Lower Carniola
- Statistical region: Central Slovenia
- Municipality: Ivančna Gorica

Area
  - Total: 0.23 km^{2} (0.089 sq mi)
- Elevation: 321.7 m (1,055 ft)

Population (2002)
  - Total: 33

Mrzlo Polje (pronounced [ˈməɾzlɔ ˈpoːljɛ]; German: Kaltenfeld) is a small settlement in the Municipality of Ivančna Gorica in central Slovenia. It lies south of Ivančna Gorica, just south of the A2 motorway in the historical region of Lower Carniola. The municipality is part of the Central Slovenia Statistical Region.
