= Mrzli Vrh, Žiri =

Mrzli Vrh
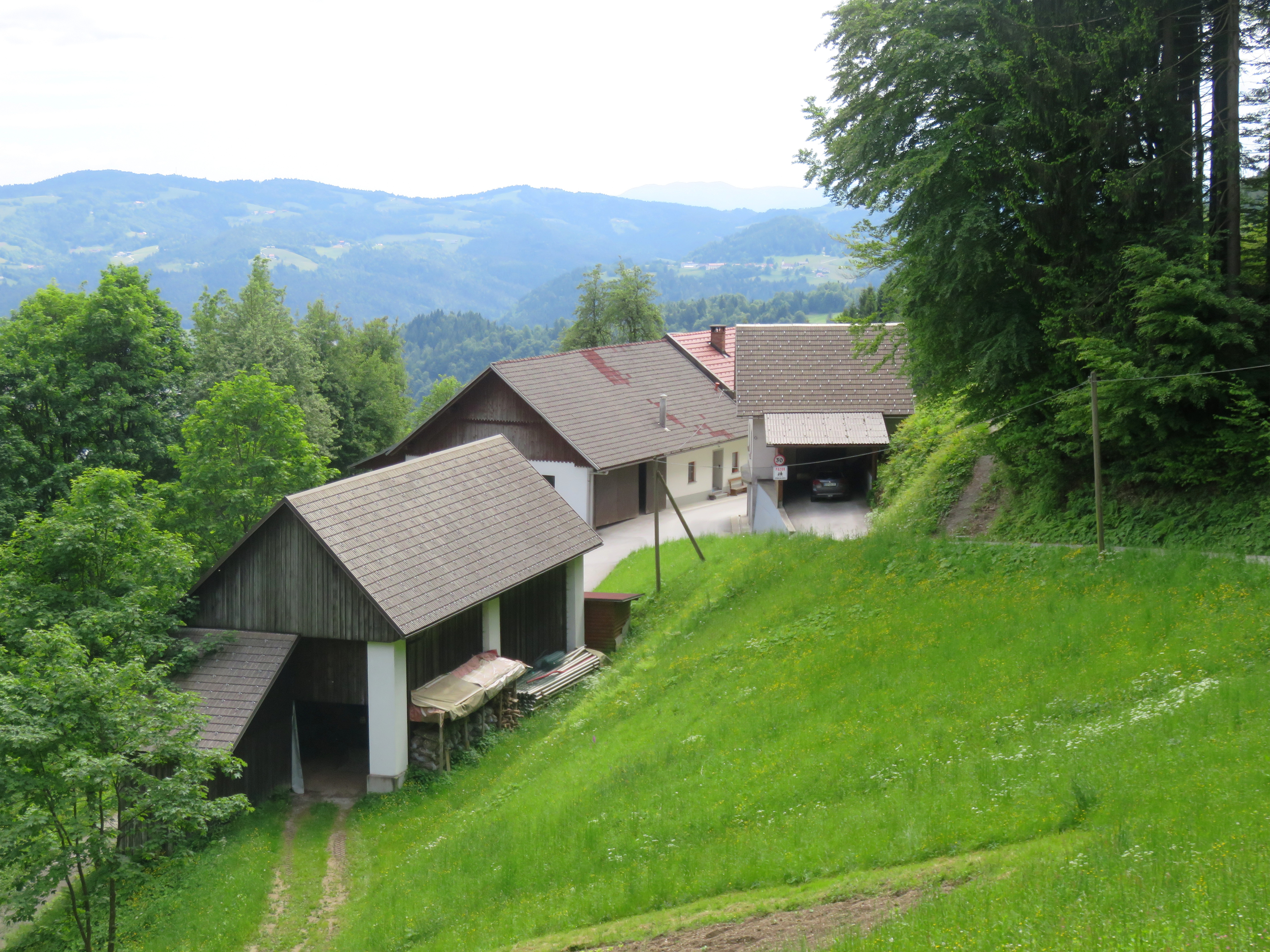

- Location in Slovenia
- Coordinates: 46°3′11″N 14°4′44″E
- Country: Slovenia
- Traditional region: Upper Carniola
- Statistical region: Upper Carniola
- Municipality: Žiri

Area
  - Total: 1.23 km^{2} (0.47 sq mi)
- Elevation: 840.2 m (2,757 ft)

Population (2002)
  - Total: 29

Mrzli Vrh (pronounced [ˈməɾzli ˈʋəɾx]) is a small dispersed settlement in the hills west of Žiri in the Upper Carniola region of Slovenia. It is a continuation of the settlement of Mrzli Vrh in the neighboring Municipality of Idrija.
