= Maršiči, Ribnica =

Maršiči
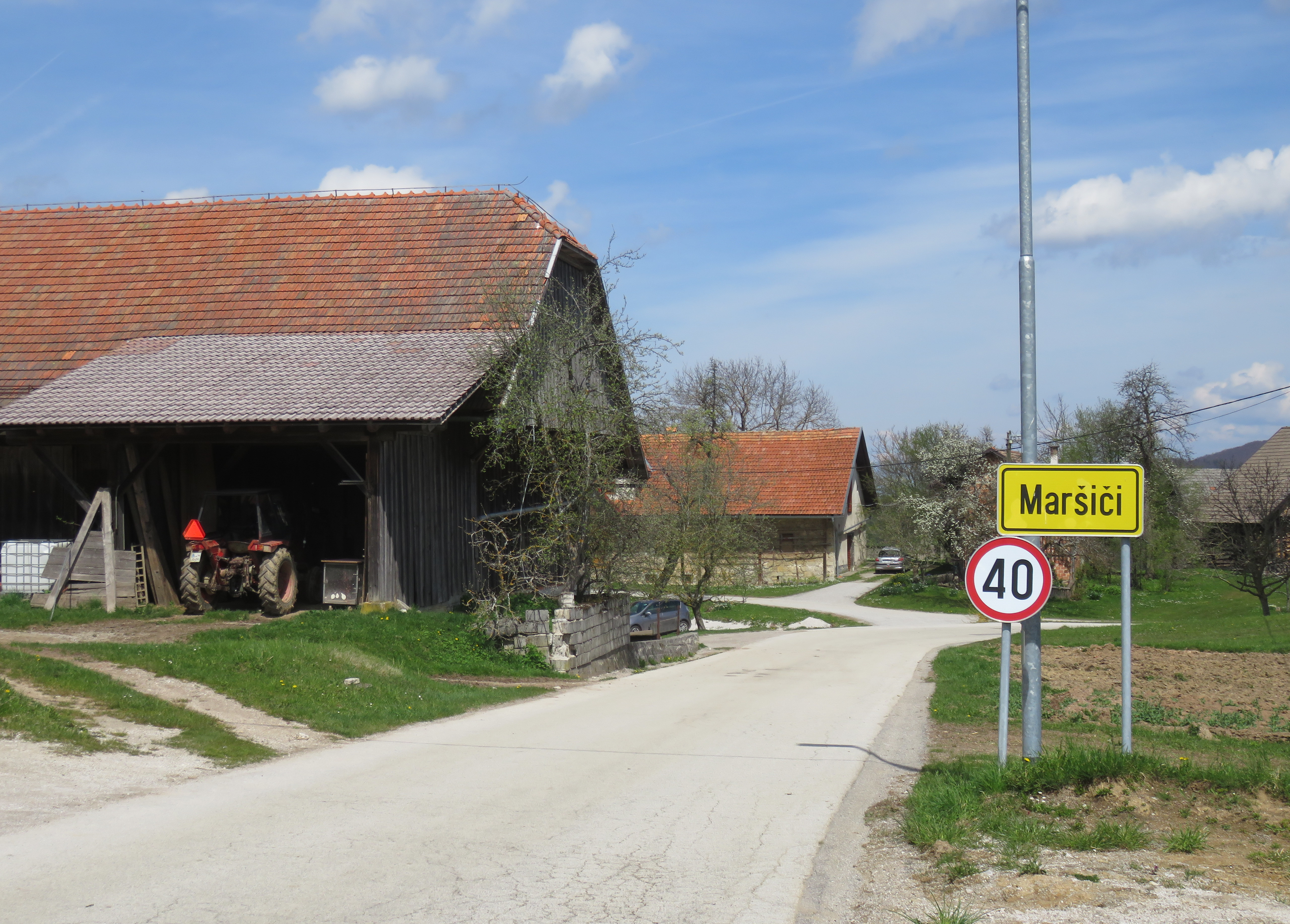

- Location in Slovenia
- Coordinates: 45°47′46.12″N 14°39′35.55″E
- Country: Slovenia
- Traditional region: Lower Carniola
- Statistical region: Southeast Slovenia
- Municipality: Ribnica

Area
  - Total: 0.47 km^{2} (0.18 sq mi)
- Elevation: 680.5 m (2,233 ft)

Population (2002)
  - Total: 20
- Postal code: 1316

Maršiči (pronounced [ˈmaːɾʃitʃi]) is a small village in the Municipality of Ribnica in southern Slovenia. The area is part of the traditional region of Lower Carniola and is now included in the Southeast Slovenia Statistical Region.

== Name ==
The name Maršiči is a collective toponym, referring to a settlement where several people with the surname Maršič lived.

== Church ==
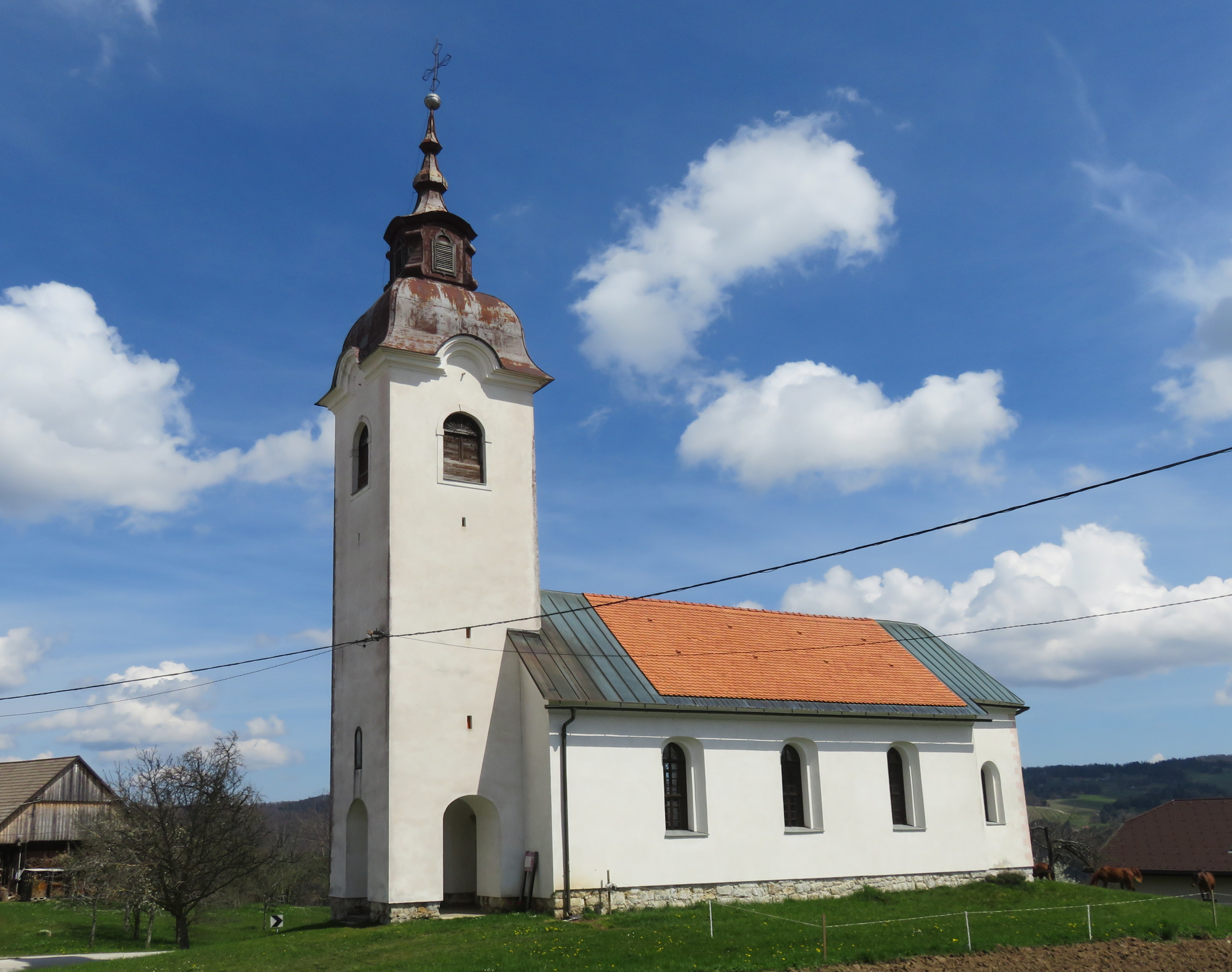
Saint Ulrich's Church

The local church, built on the southeastern edge of the settlement, is dedicated to Saint Ulrich (Slovene: sveti Urh) and belongs to the Parish of Sveti Gregor. It dates to the 16th century.
