= Mali Kal, Ivančna Gorica =

Mali Kal Farški Kal (until 1953)
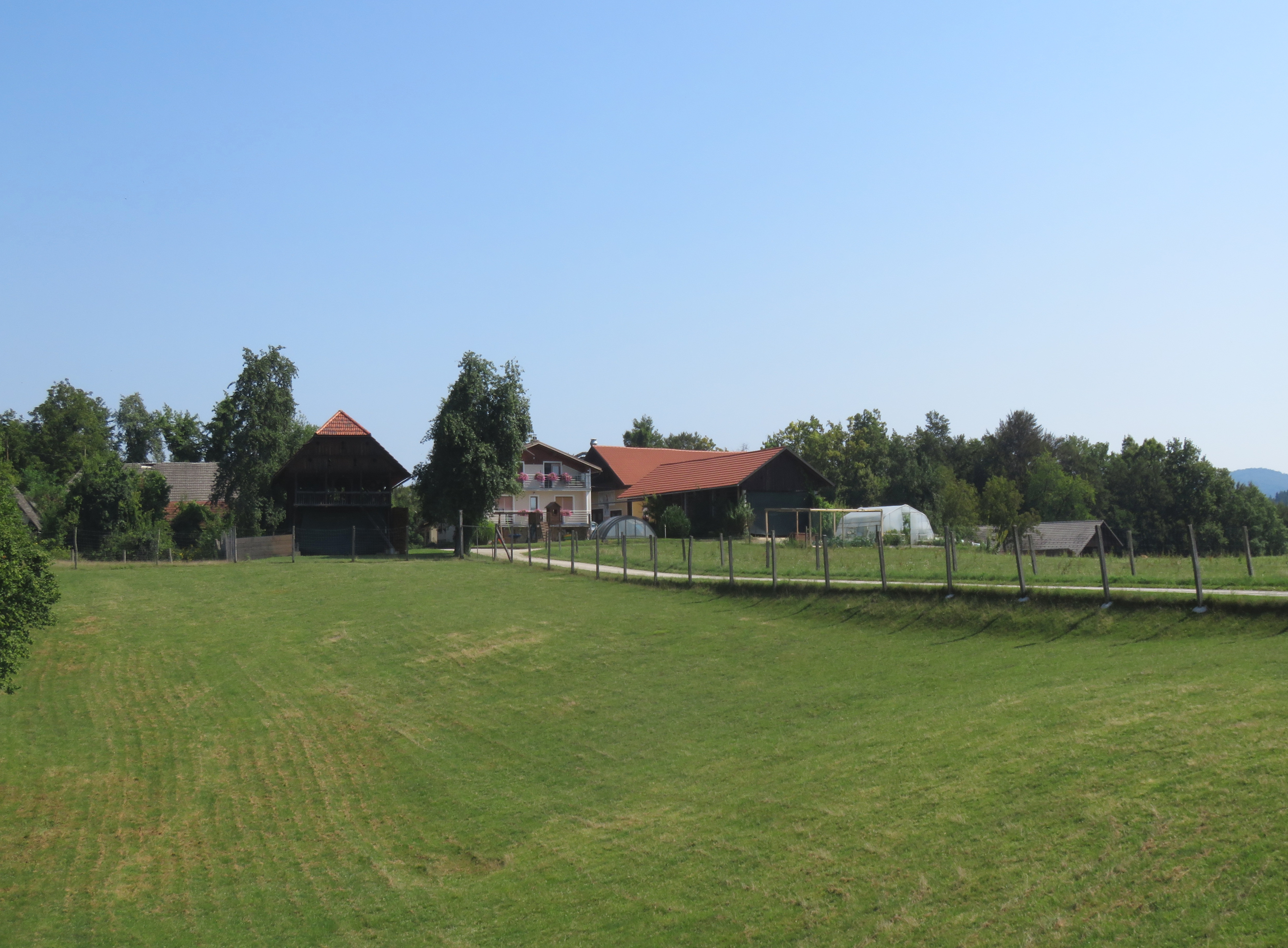

- Location in Slovenia
- Coordinates: 45°58′38.66″N 14°50′59.18″E
- Country: Slovenia
- Traditional region: Lower Carniola
- Statistical region: Central Slovenia
- Municipality: Ivančna Gorica

Area
  - Total: 0.88 km^{2} (0.34 sq mi)
- Elevation: 453.2 m (1,487 ft)

Population (2002)
  - Total: 11

Mali Kal (pronounced [ˈmaːli ˈkaːu̯]) is a small settlement in the hills north of Šentvid pri Stični in the Municipality of Ivančna Gorica in central Slovenia. The area is part of the historical region of Lower Carniola. The municipality is now included in the Central Slovenia Statistical Region.

== Name ==
The name of the settlement was changed from Farški Kal (literally, 'parish pond') to Mali Kal (literally, 'little pond') in 1953. The name was changed on the basis of the 1948 Law on Names of Settlements and Designations of Squares, Streets, and Buildings as part of efforts by Slovenia's postwar communist government to remove religious elements from toponyms. Prior to this, Mali Kal (German: Kleinkal) was the name of a hamlet of Farški Kal.
