= Mala Sela, Litija =

Mala Sela
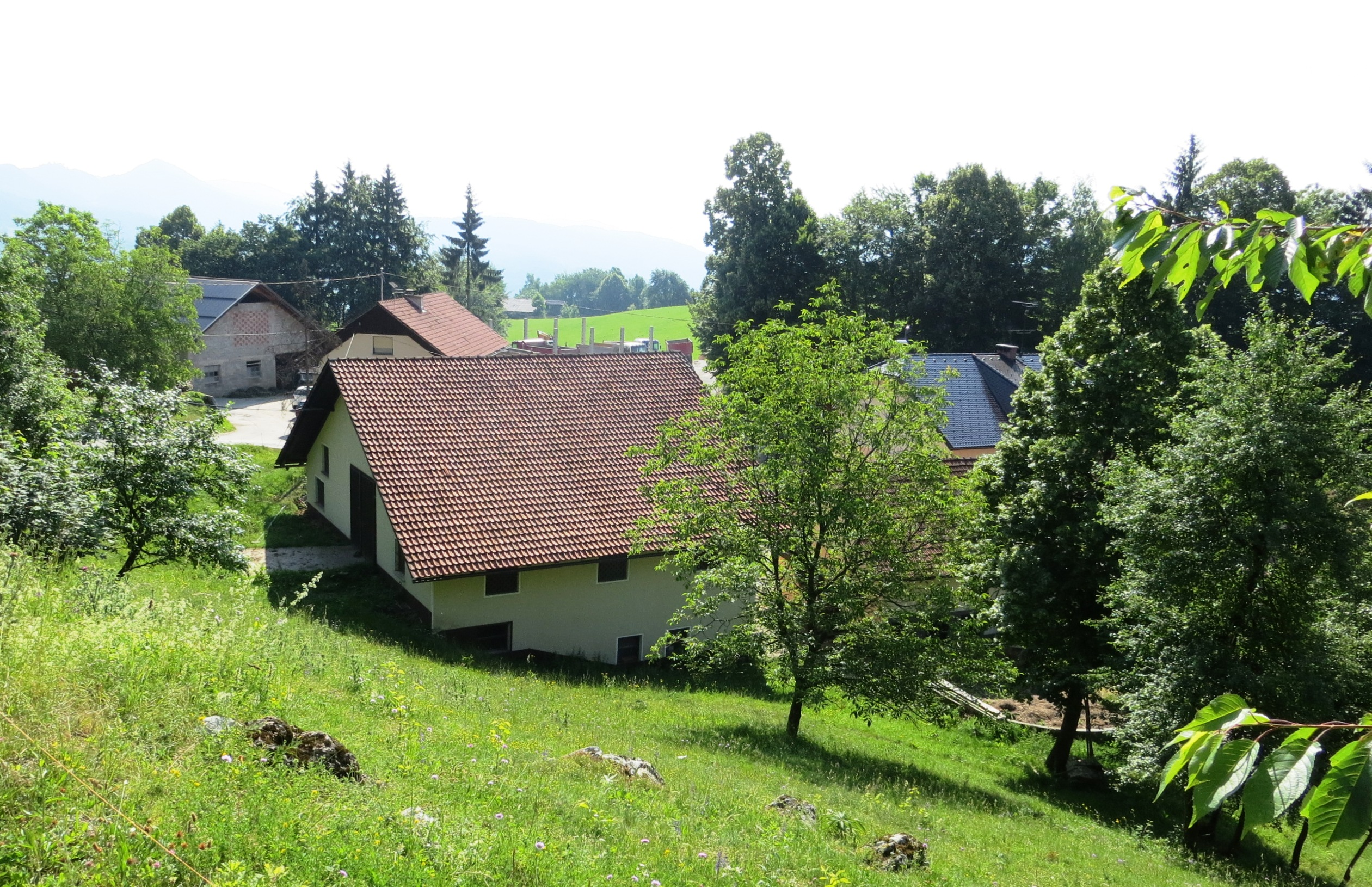

- Location in Slovenia
- Coordinates: 46°6′42.4″N 14°48′49.35″E
- Country: Slovenia
- Traditional region: Upper Carniola
- Statistical region: Central Slovenia
- Municipality: Litija

Area
  - Total: 1.1 km^{2} (0.42 sq mi)
- Elevation: 590.9 m (1,939 ft)

Population (2002)
  - Total: 26
- Postal code: 1252

Mala Sela (pronounced [ˈmaːla ˈseːla]; Slovene: Mala sela) is a small settlement west of Vače in the Municipality of Litija in central Slovenia. The area is part of the traditional region of Upper Carniola. It is now included with the rest of the municipality in the Central Sava Statistical Region.

== Name ==
There were formerly two neighboring settlements: Sela and Mala Sela (literally, 'village' and 'little village'). Mala Sela was annexed by Sela in 1953, and then in 1955 the name of the consolidated settlement was changed from Sela to Mala sela.
