= Mrzli Vrh, Idrija =

Mrzli Vrh
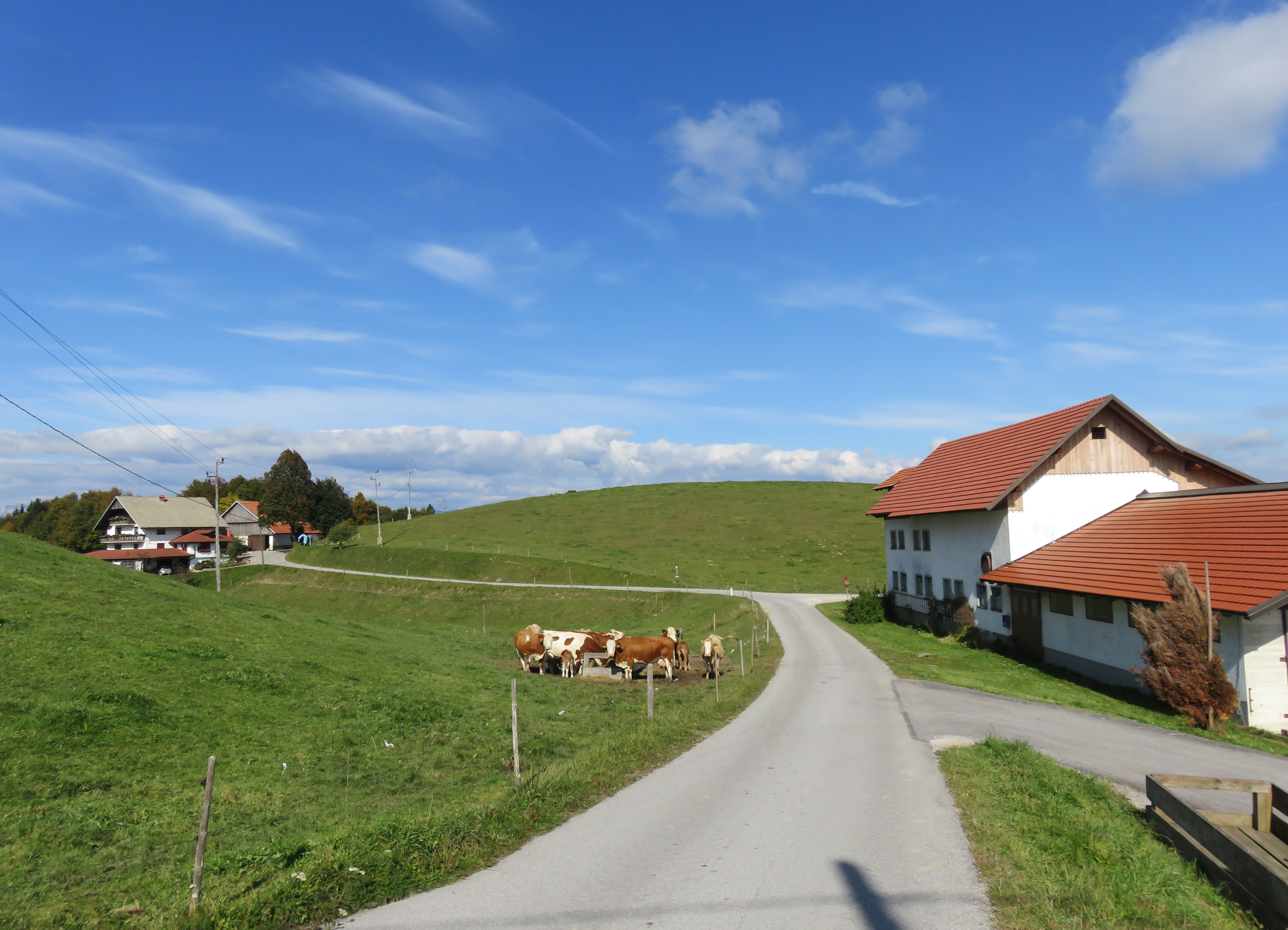

- Location in Slovenia
- Coordinates: 46°3′22.63″N 14°3′12.42″E
- Country: Slovenia
- Traditional region: Inner Carniola
- Statistical region: Gorizia
- Municipality: Idrija

Area
  - Total: 3.15 km^{2} (1.22 sq mi)
- Elevation: 961.7 m (3,155 ft)

Population (2002)
  - Total: 50

Mrzli Vrh (pronounced [ˈməɾzli ˈʋəɾx]) is a dispersed settlement in the hills northeast of Spodnja Idrija in the Municipality of Idrija in the traditional Inner Carniola region of Slovenia. It is a continuation of the settlement of Mrzli Vrh in the neighboring Municipality of Žiri.
