= Mali Lipovec, Žužemberk =

Mali Lipovec
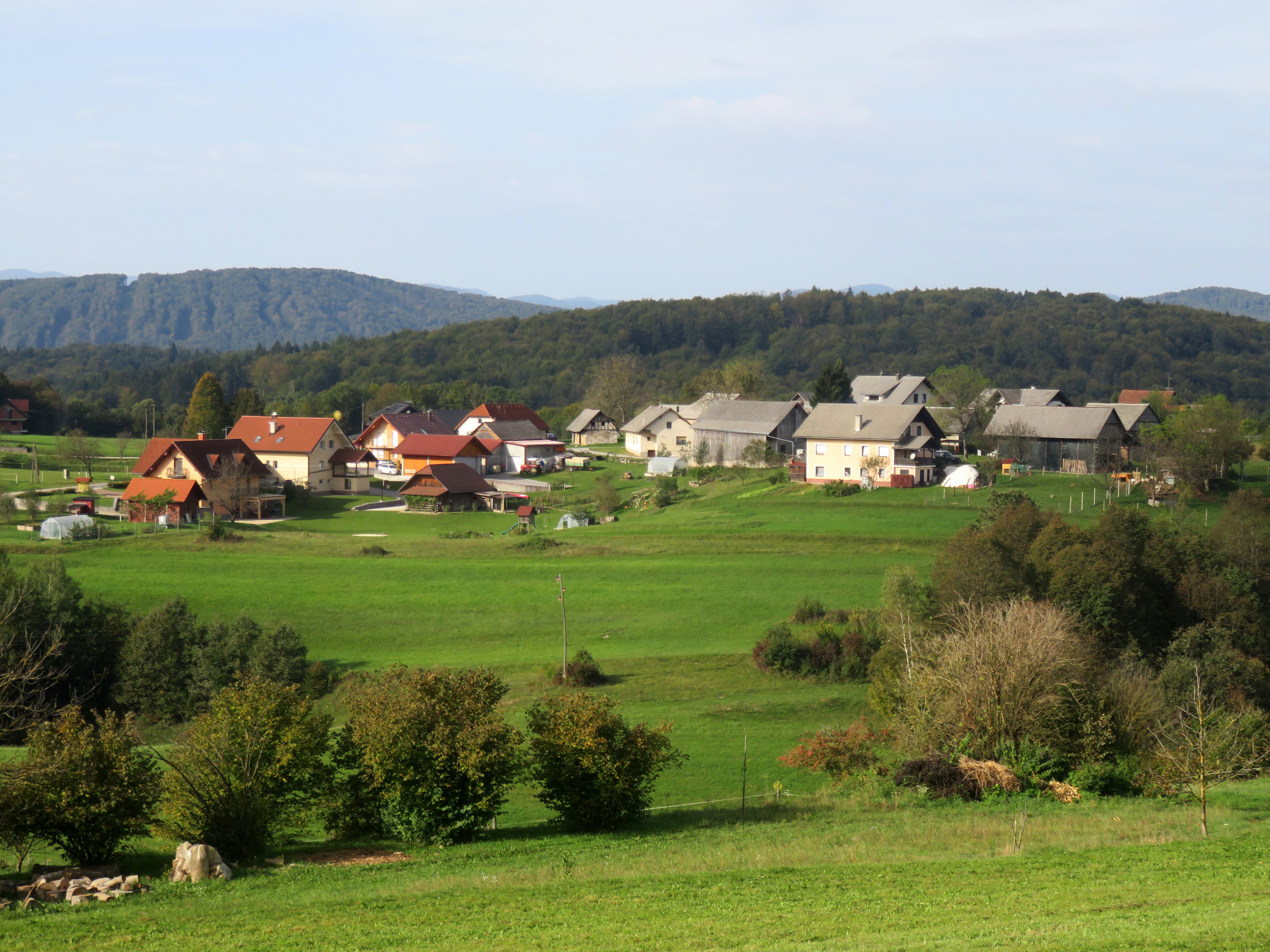

- Location in Slovenia
- Coordinates: 45°49′9.87″N 14°59′31.7″E
- Country: Slovenia
- Traditional region: Lower Carniola
- Statistical region: Southeast Slovenia
- Municipality: Žužemberk

Area
  - Total: 2.72 km^{2} (1.05 sq mi)
- Elevation: 342.8 m (1,125 ft)

Population (2002)
  - Total: 53

Mali Lipovec (pronounced [ˈmaːli ˈliːpɔʋəts]) is a settlement in the hills to the east of Dvor in the Municipality of Žužemberk in southeastern Slovenia. The area is part of the historical region of Lower Carniola. The municipality is now included in the Southeast Slovenia Statistical Region.
