= Adlešiči =

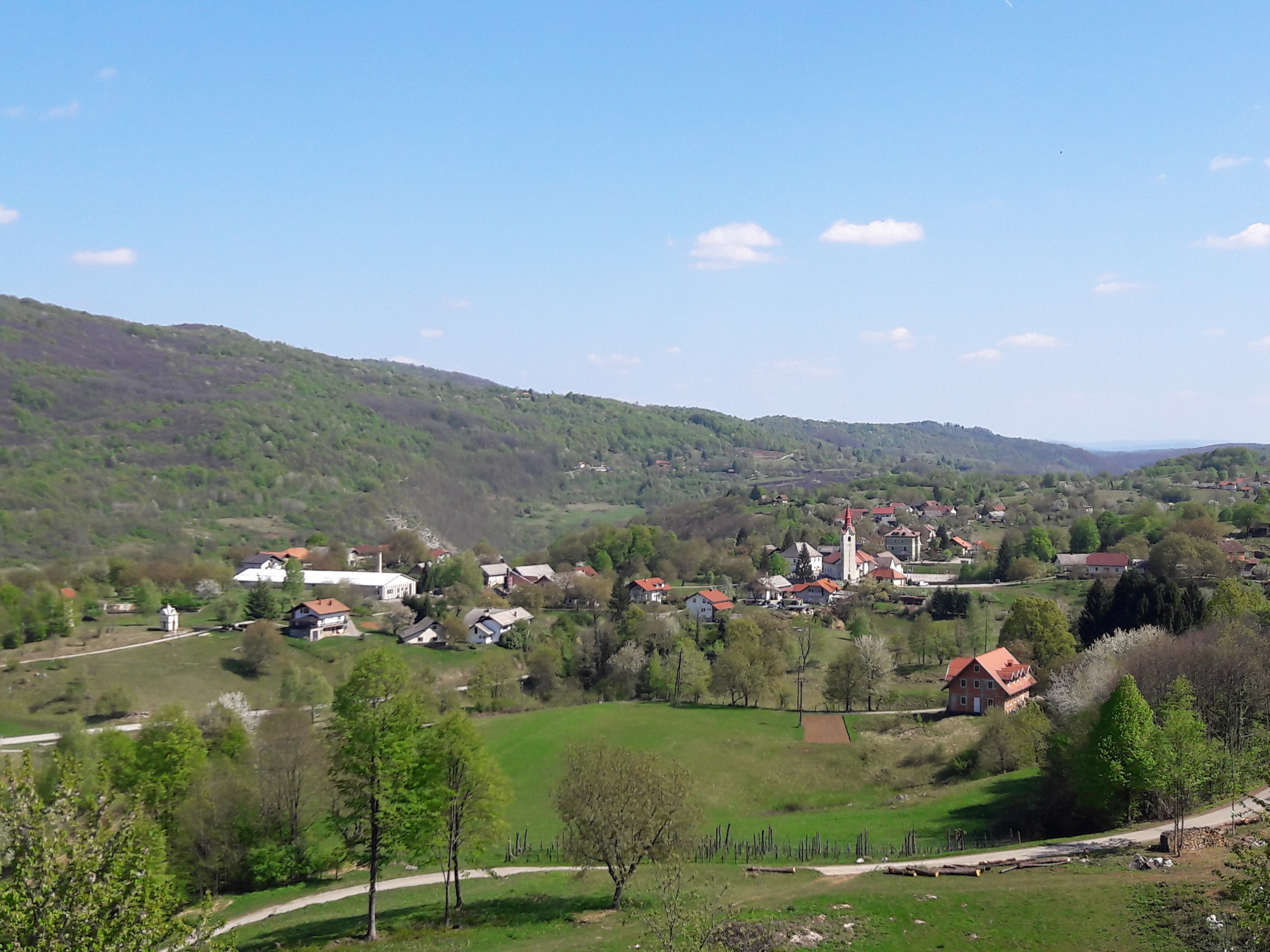
- Adlešiči

- Location in Slovenia
- Coordinates: 45°31′20.63″N 15°18′39.76″E
- Country: Slovenia
- Traditional region: White Carniola
- Statistical region: Southeast Slovenia
- Municipality: Črnomelj

Area
  - Total: 1.58 km^{2} (0.61 sq mi)
- Elevation: 212.6 m (698 ft)

Population (2020)
  - Total: 108
  - Density: 68.4/km^{2} (177/sq mi)
- Postal code: 8341
- Climate: Cfb

Adlešiči (pronounced [ˈaːdlɛʃitʃi]; German: Adleschitz) is a settlement on the left bank of the Kolpa River in the Municipality of Črnomelj in the White Carniola area of southeastern Slovenia. The area is part of the traditional region of Lower Carniola and is now included in the Southeast Slovenia Statistical Region. It also encompasses a hamlet to the east near the bank of the Kolpa River called Nabrežci (literally, 'on the bank'), also known as Nabreško Selo (Slovene: Nabreško selo, literally 'settlement on the bank').

== Name ==
Adlešiči was attested in historical sources as sancti Nicolai in 1334.

== Church ==
The local parish church is dedicated to Saint Nicholas (Slovene: sveti Miklavž) and belongs to the Roman Catholic Diocese of Novo Mesto. The church was first mentioned in written documents dating to 1334, but it owes its current Baroque look to a major remodelling in the second half of the 18th century. The main altar dates to 1782.
