= Ivančna Gorica =

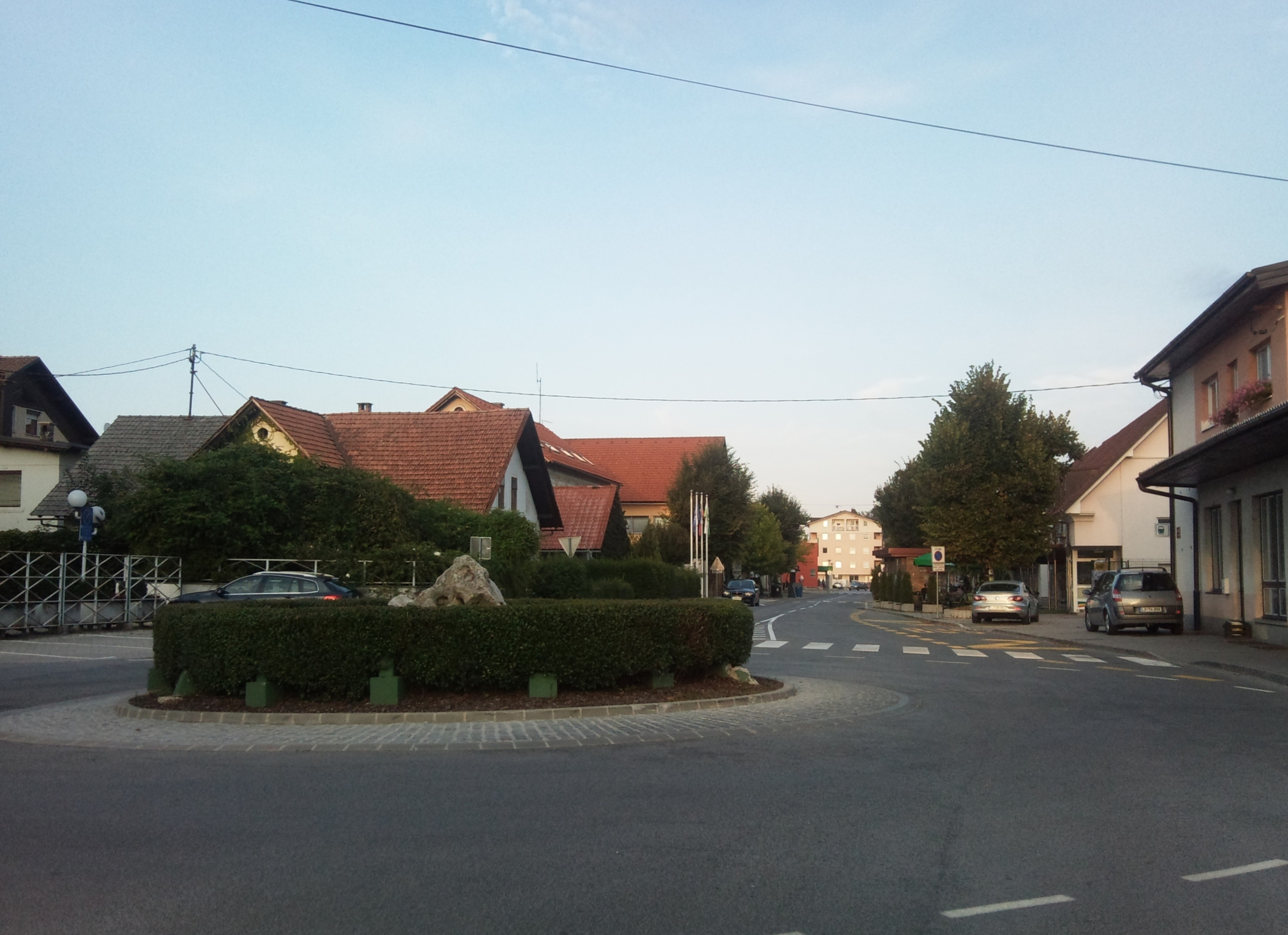

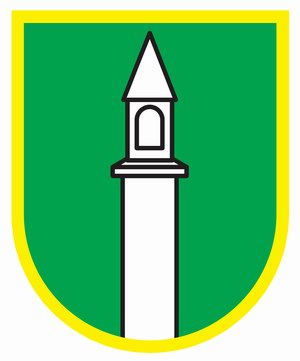
- Coat of arms

- Location in Slovenia
- Coordinates: 45°56′14.59″N 14°48′10.58″E
- Country: Slovenia
- Traditional region: Lower Carniola
- Statistical region: Central Slovenia
- Municipality: Ivančna Gorica

Area
  - Total: 1.82 km^{2} (0.70 sq mi)
- Elevation: 355.2 m (1,165 ft)

Population (2019)
  - Total: 2,205

Ivančna Gorica (pronounced [iˈʋaːntʃna ɡɔˈɾiːtsa]; in older sources also Vanjčina Gorica) is a settlement in central Slovenia. It is the seat of the Municipality of Ivančna Gorica. It is part of the traditional region of Lower Carniola and is now included in the Central Slovenia Statistical Region.

== Name ==
The name Ivančna Gorica literally means 'Ivanko's hill', which is the name of a local hill. While the settlement was still a hamlet, it was known as Pod Ivančno gorico (literally, 'below Ivanko's hill'). Like similar names (e.g., Ivanjkovci, Spodnji Ivanjci, etc.), it is derived from the hypocorism *Ivanko, based on the personal name Ivan 'John'.

== History ==
Ivančna Gorica did not exist as a settlement until 1945, before which it was a hamlet of Stična and Mleščevo. After the Second World War, the spruce forest on Ivanko's Hill (Slovene: Ivančna gorica) was cleared and houses were built. The number of houses in the settlement grew rapidly during the 1960s.

== Church and shrine ==
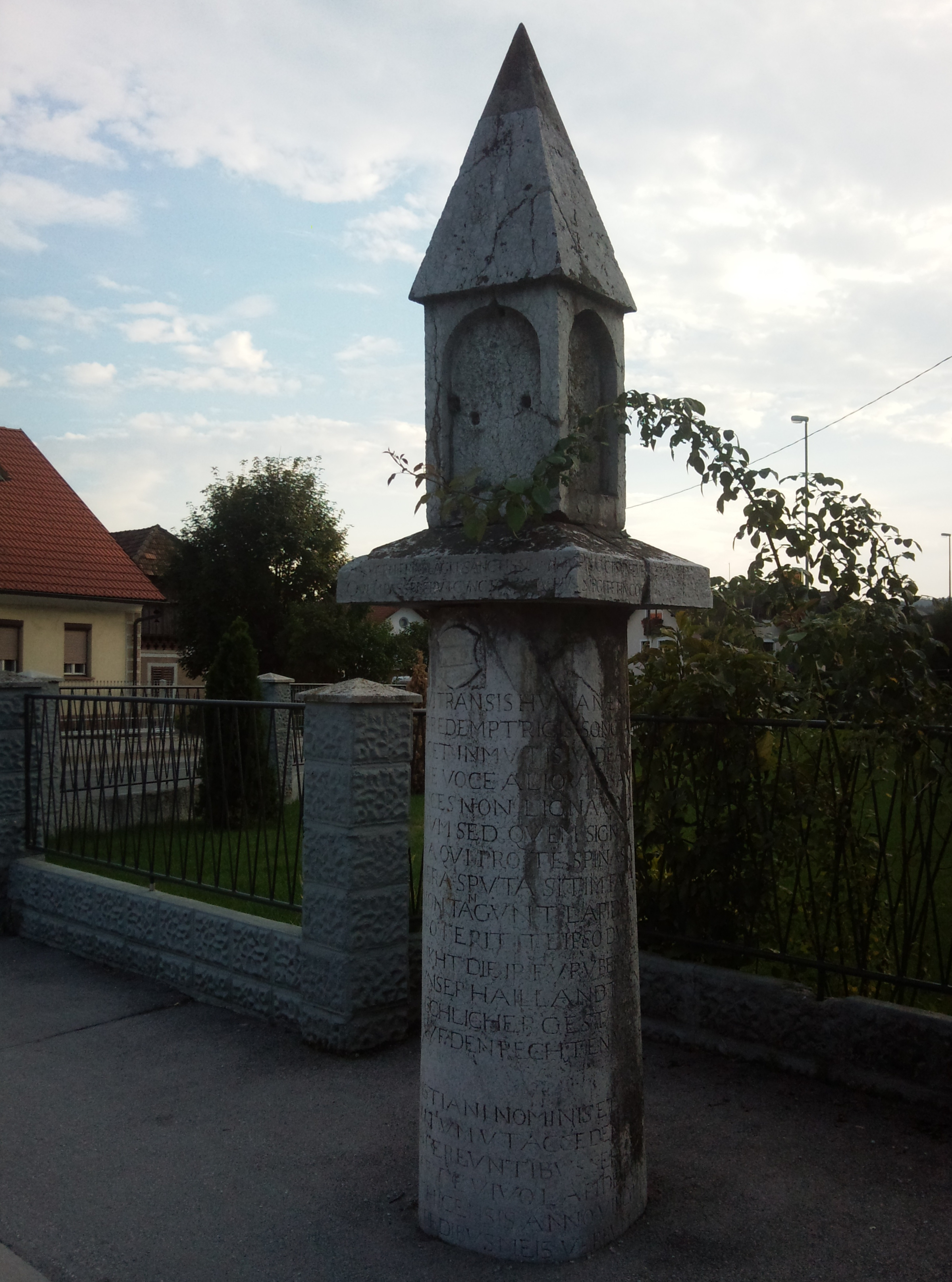
Roman milestone

The parish church in the settlement is dedicated to Saint Joseph and belongs to the Roman Catholic Archdiocese of Ljubljana. A wayside shrine in the centre of the settlement known as the Abbot's shrine (Slovene: Opatovo znamenje) appears on the coat of arms of the municipality. It was a Roman milestone that was recarved in 1583 on the orders of Laurentius Rainer, the abbot of the Cistercian Abbey at nearby Stična.

== Notable people ==
Notable people that were born or lived in Ivančna Gorica include:

- Janez Eržen (1929–2009), theater actor
- Nina Pušlar (born 1988), musician
- Mark Kastelic (born 2007), racing driver

== Economy ==
Akrapovič, a Slovenian firm manufacturing motorcycle exhaust systems, is based in Ivančna Gorica.
