= Mošenik, Moravče =

Mošenik
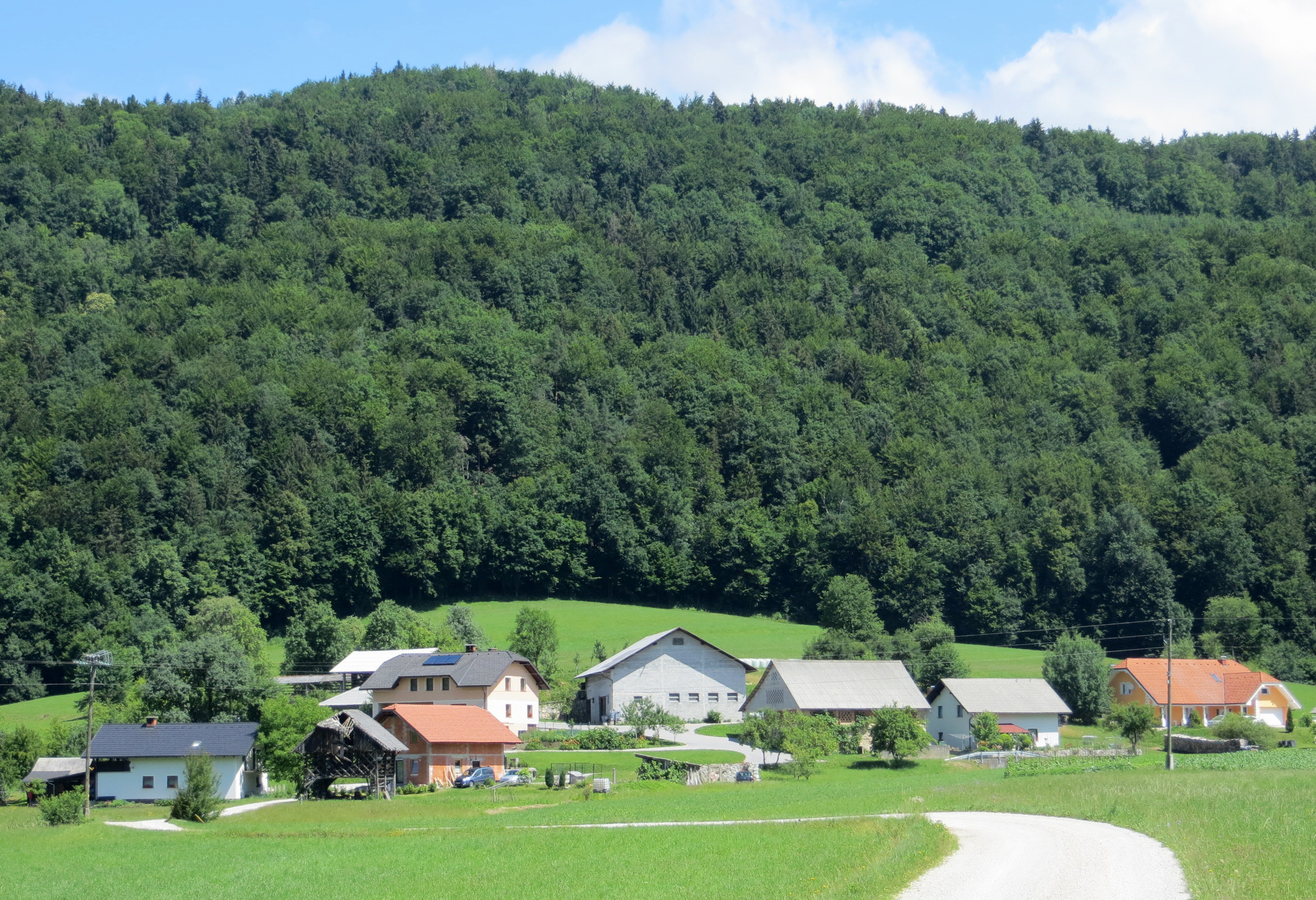

- Location in Slovenia
- Coordinates: 46°8′45.27″N 14°46′43.58″E
- Country: Slovenia
- Traditional region: Upper Carniola
- Statistical region: Central Slovenia
- Municipality: Moravče

Area
  - Total: 1.26 km^{2} (0.49 sq mi)
- Elevation: 389.5 m (1,278 ft)

Population (2002)
  - Total: 63
- Postal code: 1251

Mošenik (pronounced [mɔʃɛˈniːk]) is a settlement northeast of Moravče in central Slovenia. The area is part of the traditional region of Upper Carniola. It is now included with the rest of the Municipality of Moravče in the Central Slovenia Statistical Region.

== Name ==
Mošenik was attested in historical sources as Moschznik in 1335, Moschtzenik in 1347, Moͤschnik in 1349, and Mosschanichk in 1392, among other spellings.
