= Velika Polana =

Settlement of Slovenia

Velika Polana Nagypalina (Hungarian)
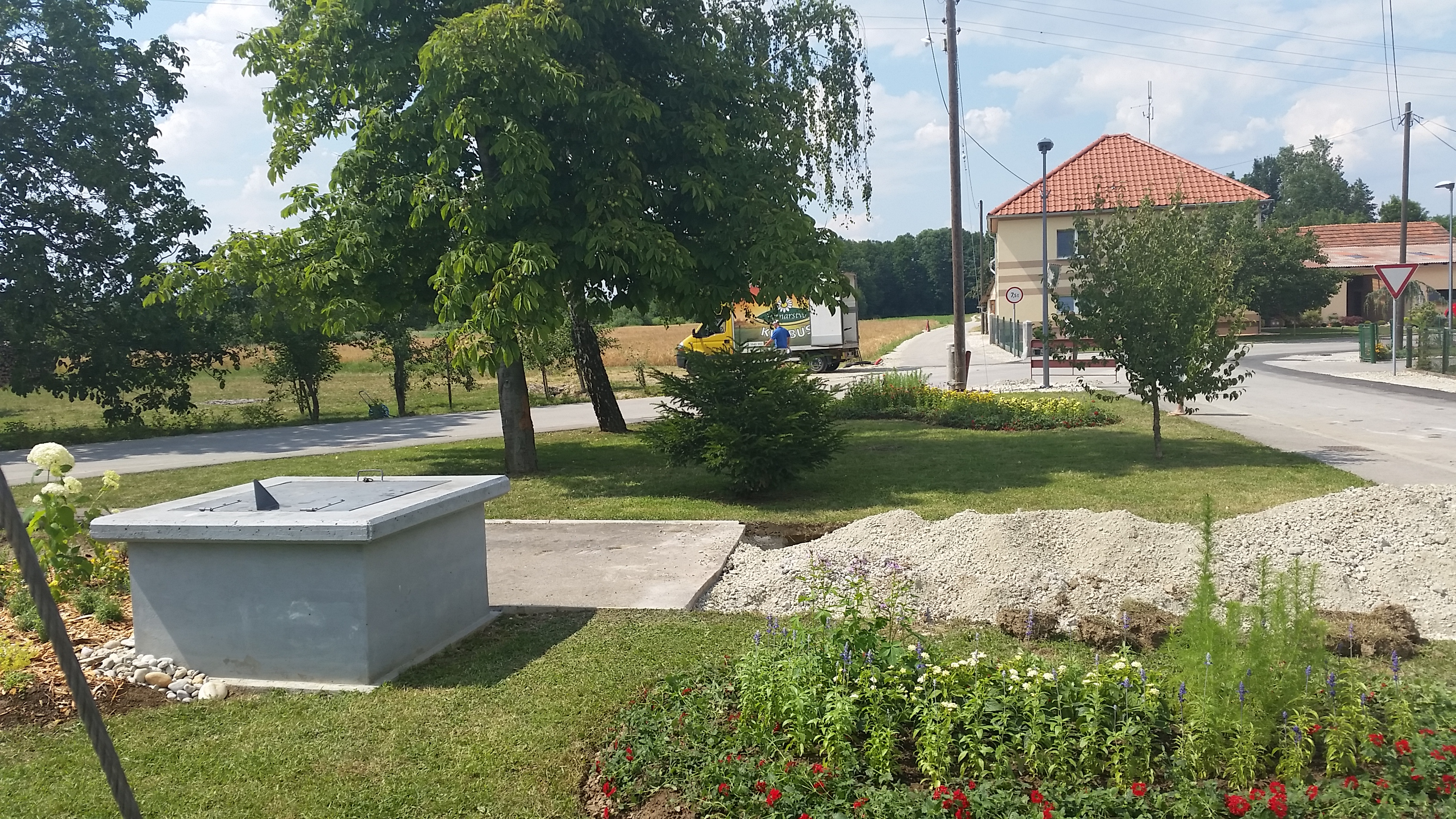

- Flag Coat of arms

- Location in Slovenia
- Coordinates: 46°34′19″N 16°20′50″E
- Country: Slovenia
- Traditional region: Prekmurje
- Statistical region: Mura
- Municipality: Velika Polana

Area
  - Total: 7.61 km^{2} (2.94 sq mi)
- Elevation: 166.6 m (547 ft)

Population (2019)
  - Total: 870

Velika Polana (pronounced [ˈʋeːlika ˈpoːlana]; Hungarian: Nagypalina) is a town in Slovenia. It is the seat of the Municipality of Velika Polana.

It has been designated a "stork village" (i.e., a settlement with 10 or more stork nests). It was also the home of the Slovene writer Miško Kranjec. The house where he was born (which is also the tourist information office) can be visited. The village is surrounded by fenland and fields of sunflowers, pumpkins, and wheat. Črnec Creek, a tributary of the Ledava, flows past the settlement. The best way to explore the area is by cycling or walking the numerous trails.

== Church ==
The parish church in the settlement is dedicated to the Sacred Heart of Jesus and belongs to the Roman Catholic Diocese of Murska Sobota. It was built in 1924.

== Notable people ==
Notable people that were born or lived in Velika Polana include:

- Miško Kranjec (1908–1983), writer
