= Šentlovrenc =

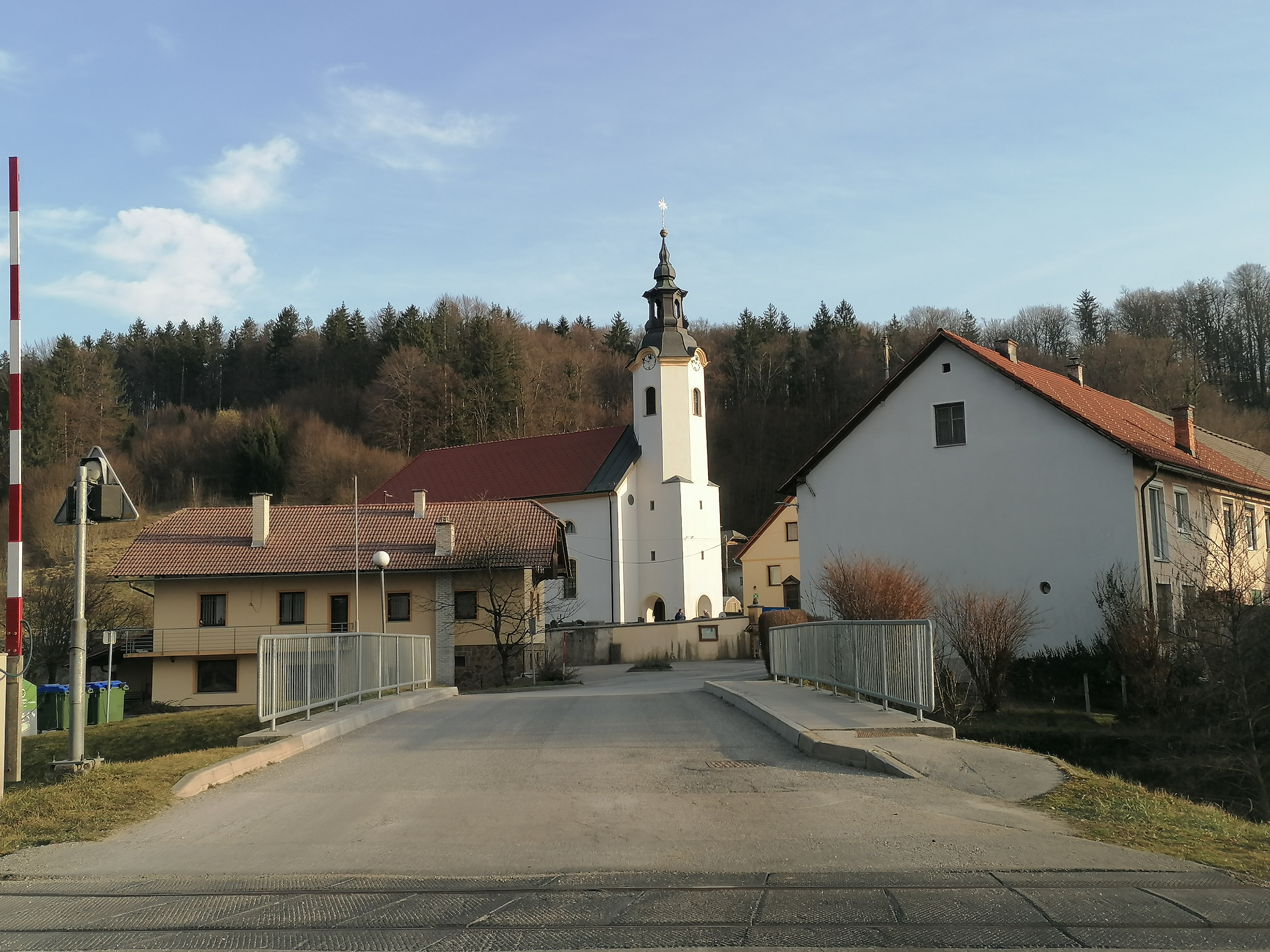

- Location in Slovenia
- Coordinates: 45°56′58.1″N 14°56′44.04″E
- Country: Slovenia
- Traditional region: Lower Carniola
- Statistical region: Southeast Slovenia
- Municipality: Trebnje

Area
  - Total: 0.48 km^{2} (0.19 sq mi)
- Elevation: 287.5 m (943 ft)

Population (2002)
  - Total: 102

Šentlovrenc (pronounced [ʃɛnˈtloːu̯ɾɛnts] or [ʃənˈtloːu̯ɾɛnts]) is a village on the Temenica River in the Municipality of Trebnje in eastern Slovenia. The area is part of the traditional region of Lower Carniola. The municipality is now included in the Southeast Slovenia Statistical Region.

== Church ==
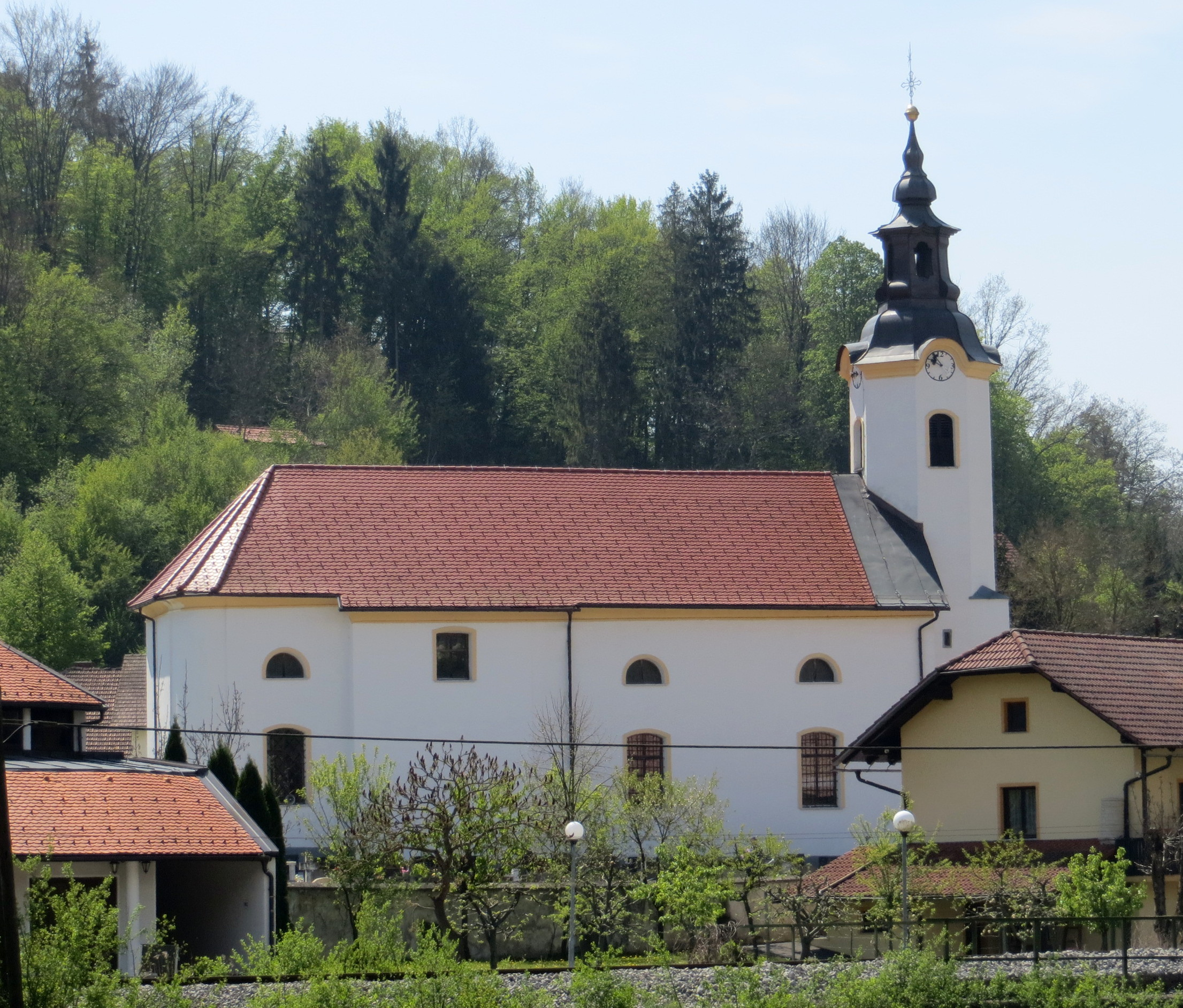
Saint Lawrence's Church

The local parish church, from which the settlement gets its name, is dedicated to Saint Lawrence and belongs to the Roman Catholic Diocese of Novo Mesto. It was first mentioned in written documents dating to 1177, but the current building is a result of various extensive rebuilding stages, most recently in the 19th century.
