= Albina Mali =

Slovenian communist activist and partisan (1925-2001)

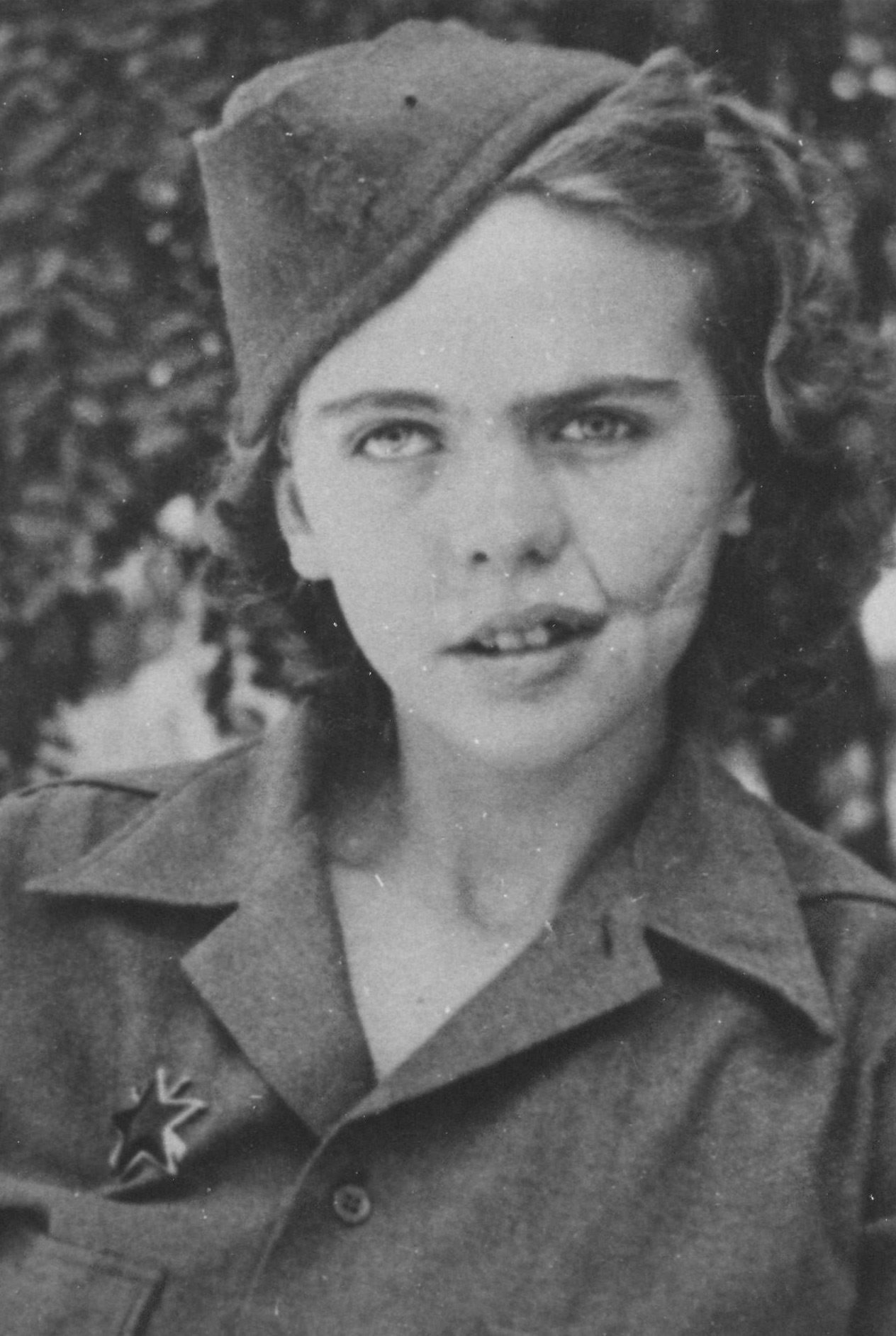
Albina Mali

Albina Mali-Hočevar (12 September 1925 – 24 January 2001) was a Slovenian member of the Yugoslav Partisans, serving as a soldier during the Second World War and later served various political roles in the Yugoslav Communist Party. Albina Mali is historically significant as one of the youngest and most active female Slovenian Partisan fighters and resistance couriers during World War II, whose life reflects the broader story of Yugoslav anti-fascist resistance, women’s participation in the liberation struggle, and the formation of postwar socialist leadership in Slovenia.

== Biography ==
Albina Mali was born 12 September 1925 in the Slovenian village of Vinica in Črnomelj Municipality, to a working-class family with eight children. Her father was a shoemaker and her mother was a general worker. Mali began her studies in Črnomelj but in her third year, her father became ill and the family moved to Jurka Vas, where he would die in 1934. Due to this, Mali would leave school to join the work force to support the family, originally in Vrh pri Šmihel and two years later in Brezova Reber pri Dvoru. While living with family in Brezova Reber pri Dvoru that Mali attended the school of Dolnji Ajdovec, where she graduated in 1941. Following the beginning of World War II in Yugoslavia, Mali joined the National Liberation Movement and was trained under Herman Heningman, a partisan from Dolenjske Toplice. She maintained communication between Novo Mesto and Brezova Reber, where the activists and the partisan encampment were located.

In December 1941, she left Brezova Reber and, on Heningman's orders, got a job in Novo Mesto. Operating out of the hotel where she worked, Mali disseminated leaflets and flyers and kept contact with incoming couriers. Three months later, Mali moved in with her mother in Češča Vas. During this time, she coordinated contact between Novo Mesto, Češča Vas, Brezova Reber and Prečna. In June 1942, a company of guards from the West Lower Carniola detachment was liberated and transferred from Vrezovo Rebro to Jošt. As the Italian counterassault on liberated partisan territory continued, the detachment was split into several smaller groups, reforming into a single unit in Podstenice following the end of the offensive. It was in Podstenice, in August 1942 that Mali was admitted into the Young Communist League of Yugoslavia. In December 1942, Mali became a soldier in the movement, serving in the 3rd Company of the 3rd battalion of the 1st national liberation Slovenian proletarian strike brigade “Tone Tomšič”. Mali worked as a nurse, first in a brigade, then later in a company, and a battalion, where she became battalion secretary for the Young Communist League. Mali was unhappy in her role as a nurse, crying from the frustration caused by the job.

Mali fought in military campaigns across Slovenia through 1942 and 1943. She was wounded three times during this campaign; on the battlefield in September 1942 near Suvoj, on 21 January 1943 in a battle against a White Guard redoubt near Zagorica pri Čatežu, and on 15 September 1943 near Veliki Osolnik during the battle for Turjak, when a mine exploded next to her causing her severe injuries including the loss of her left eye & her iconic facial disfigurement Following this injury, Mali was moved to Jelendol Partisan hospital in Kočevski Rog, and later to Črmošnjice (Note: There are two settlements near Kočevski Rog named Črmošnjice: Črmošnjice, Semič (the closer of the two) and Črmošnjice pri Stopičah. A source has not been found to determine which is correct.) and then Žumberak in Croatia. In 1944 she became a member of the League of Communists of Yugoslavia.

Mali left Žumberak at the end of 1944 and returned to White Carniola, where she participated in battles with the local Partisan detachment. She attended the communist party school from May to July of 1944 in Kočevski Rog. Following the end of her studies, Mali worked as a nurse transporting wounded Italians in Bari, Gravina, Barletta until November 1944 when she worked in Split. Mali fought with the 8th Dalmatian Corps as a nurse until 14 January 1945 when she was transferred to an orphanage in Novigrad. At the end of the war, Mali moved first to Zadar, and later to Trieste, Novo Mesto, Pag, Poreč, Kobarid, and Ilirska Bistrica, before finally settling in Maribor in December 1955. In Ljubljana, she became a member of the Krsko and Maribor committees of the League of Communists of Slovenia.

== Death ==
Albina Mali-Hočevar died on 24 January 2001, aged 75.

== Awards ==
Among other Yugoslav decorations, Mali was awarded the Commemorative Medal of the Partisans in 1946 and in 1953 was awarded the Order of the People's Hero.

== See also ==
• Danuta Siedzikowna
