= Osolnik =

Osolnik may refer to:

== People ==
- Rude Osolnik (1915–2001) American woodturner, author, and educator

== Places ==
- Osolnik, Medvode, dispersed settlement in Upper Carniola, Slovenia
- Mali Osolnik, village in Lower Carniola, Slovenia
- Veliki Osolnik, village in Lower Carniola, Slovenia
