= Zagorica =

Zagorica may refer to:

In Serbia:

- Zagorica, Serbia, a village in the Municipality of Topola

In Slovenia:

- Zagorica, Dobrepolje, a settlement in the Municipality of Dobrepolje, southern Slovenia
- Zagorica, Litija, a settlement in the Municipality of Litija, central Slovenia
- Zagorica, Mirna, a settlement in the Municipality of Mirna, southeastern Slovenia
- Zagorica nad Kamnikom, a settlement in the Municipality of Kamnik, northern Slovenia
- Zagorica pri Čatežu, a settlement in the Municipality of Trebnje, southeastern Slovenia
- Zagorica pri Dobrniču, a settlement in the Municipality of Trebnje, southeastern Slovenia
- Zagorica pri Dolskem, a settlement in the Municipality of Dol pri Ljubljani, central Slovenia
- Zagorica pri Rovah, a settlement in the Municipality of Domžale, northern Slovenia
- Zagorica pri Velikem Gabru, a village in the Municipality of Trebnje, southeastern Slovenia
