= Municipality of Straža =

Municipality of Slovenia

Municipality of Straža Občina Straža
- Municipality
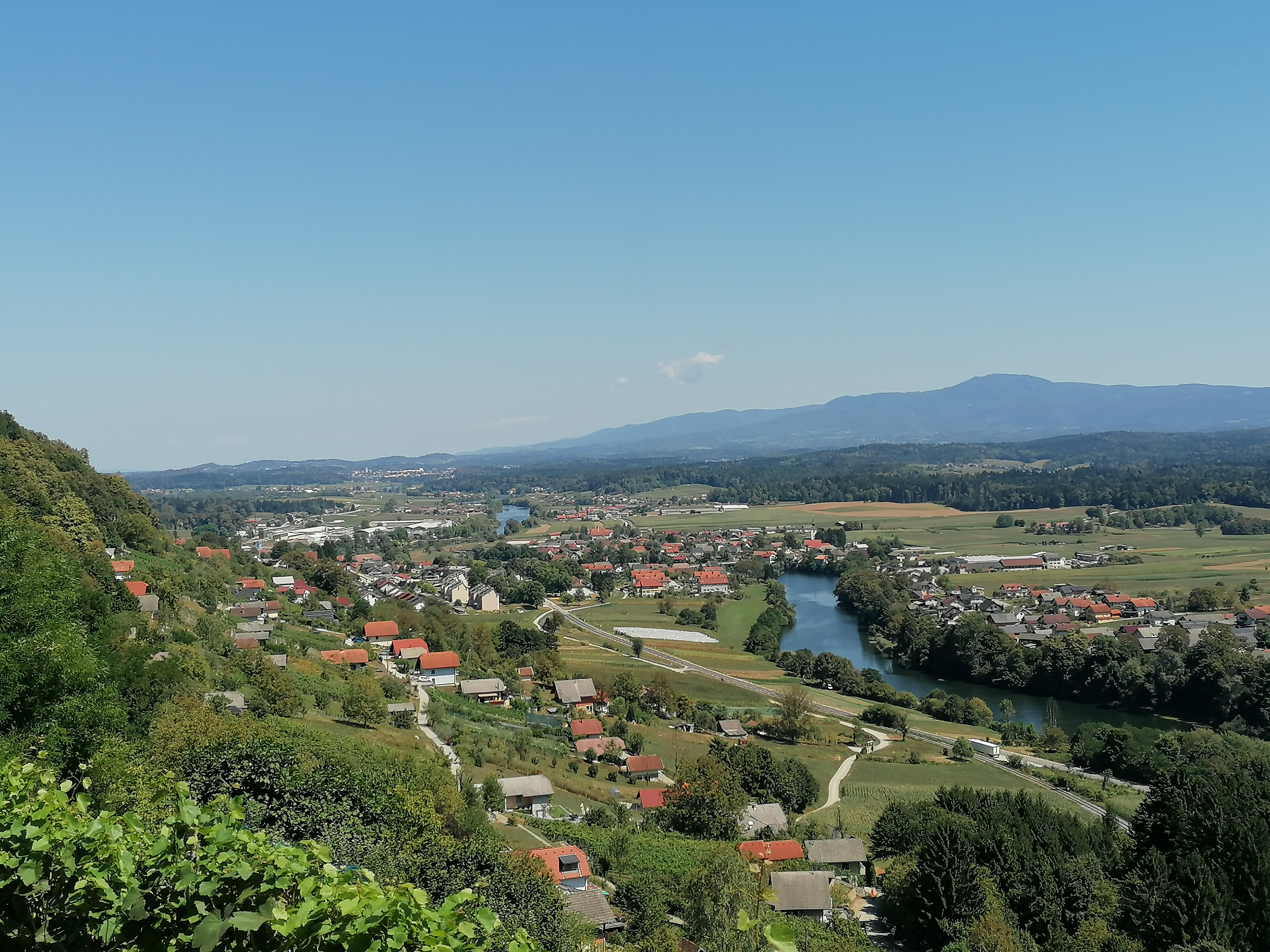

- Location of the Municipality of Straža in Slovenia
- Coordinates: 45°47′11″N 15°04′28″E
- Country: Slovenia

Government
  - Mayor: Dušan Krštinc

Population (2002)
  - Total: 3,661
- Time zone: UTC+01 (CET)
  - Summer (DST): UTC+02 (CEST)
- Website: www.obcina-straza.si

The Municipality of Straža (pronounced [ˈstɾaːʒa]; Slovene: Občina Straža) is a municipality in southeastern Slovenia. It lies on the banks of the Krka River in the traditional region of Lower Carniola. The municipality was created in 2006 when it split from the City Municipality of Novo Mesto. It is included in the Southeast Slovenia Statistical Region. It has over 3,500 inhabitants. Its seat is Straža.

The main employer was the Novoles company, based in the town as well as a number of smaller companies. There are many vineyards in the area.

== Settlements ==
In addition to the municipal seat of Straža, the municipality also includes the following settlements:

- Dolnje Mraševo
- Drganja Sela
- Jurka Vas
- Loke
- Podgora
- Potok
- Prapreče pri Straži
- Rumanja Vas
- Vavta Vas
- Zalog

== Landmarks ==
There are two churches in the settlement. One is dedicated to Saint Thomas and belongs to the parish of Vavta Vas. It is a medieval building that was restyled in the Baroque in the late 17th century. The second is dedicated to the Assumption of Mary and belongs to the Parish of Prečna. It dates to the late 17th century.
