= Drganja Sela =

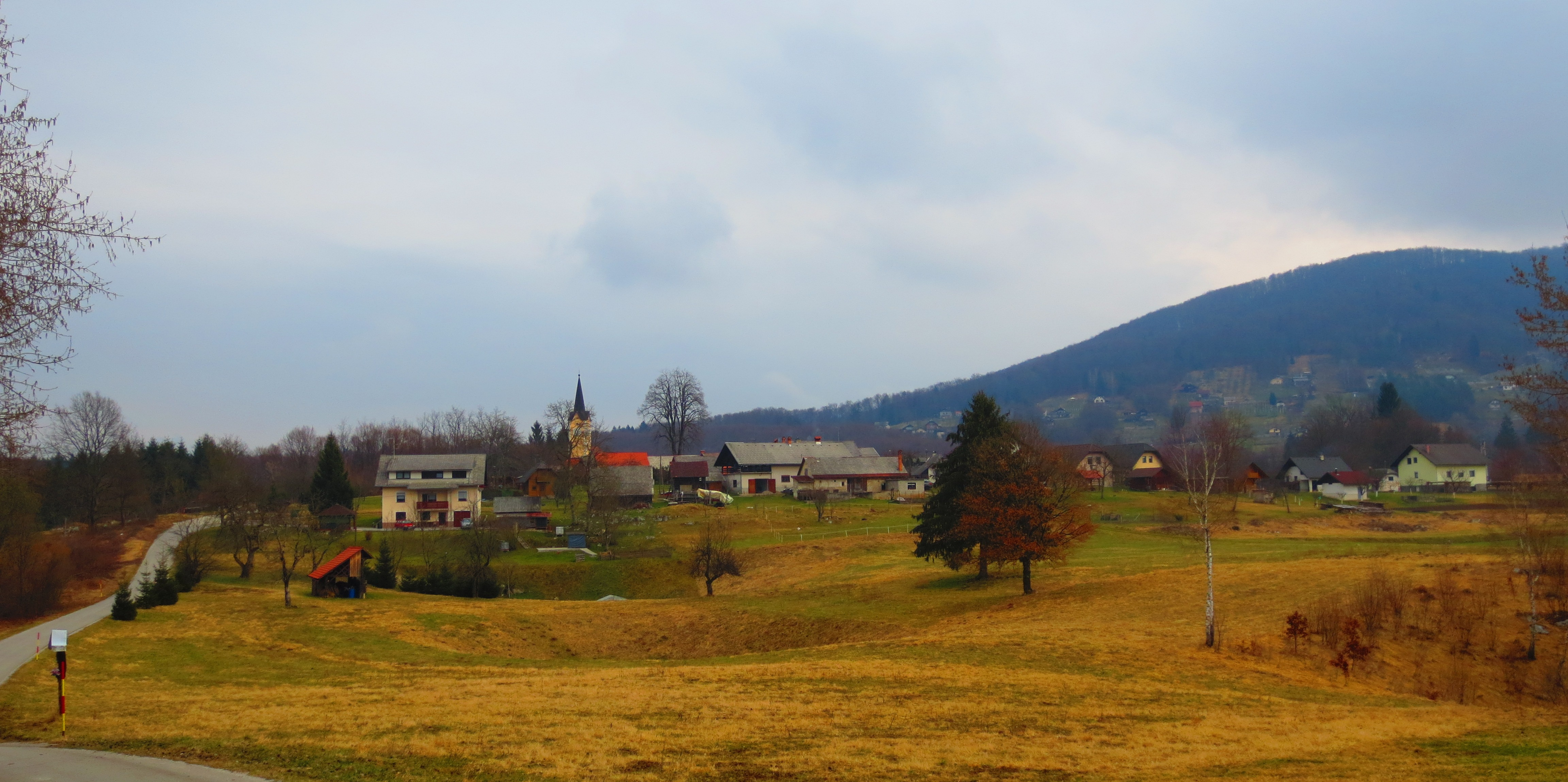

- Location in Slovenia
- Coordinates: 45°44′49.98″N 15°5′28.5″E
- Country: Slovenia
- Traditional region: Lower Carniola
- Statistical region: Southeast Slovenia
- Municipality: Straža

Area
  - Total: 5.4 km^{2} (2.1 sq mi)
- Elevation: 284.1 m (932 ft)

Population (2002)
  - Total: 162

Drganja Sela (pronounced [dəɾˈɡaːnja ˈseːla]; Slovene: Drganja sela) is a village in the Municipality of Straža in southeastern Slovenia. The area is part of the historical region of Lower Carniola. The municipality is now included in the Southeast Slovenia Statistical Region.

The local church is dedicated to Mary, Comforter of the Afflicted and belongs to the Parish of Vavta Vas. It is a medieval building that was restyled in the Baroque in the early 18th century.
