= Prapreče pri Straži =

Prapreče pri Straži Prapreče pri Gorenji Straži (1953–1988)
- Location in Slovenia
- Coordinates: 45°46′27.73″N 15°6′19.54″E
- Country: Slovenia
- Traditional region: Lower Carniola
- Statistical region: Southeast Slovenia
- Municipality: Straža

Area
  - Total: 1.55 km^{2} (0.60 sq mi)
- Elevation: 179.9 m (590 ft)

Population (2002)
  - Total: 124

Prapreče pri Straži (pronounced [ˈpɾaːpɾɛtʃɛ pɾi ˈstɾaːʒi]) is a small settlement in the Municipality of Straža in southeastern Slovenia. It lies just south of Potok. The area is part of the traditional region of Lower Carniola and is now included in the Southeast Slovenia Statistical Region.

== Name ==
The name of the settlement was changed from Prapreče to Prapreče pri Gorenji Straži in 1953. The name was changed again to Prapreče pri Straži in 1988.
