= Straža, Straža =

Straža
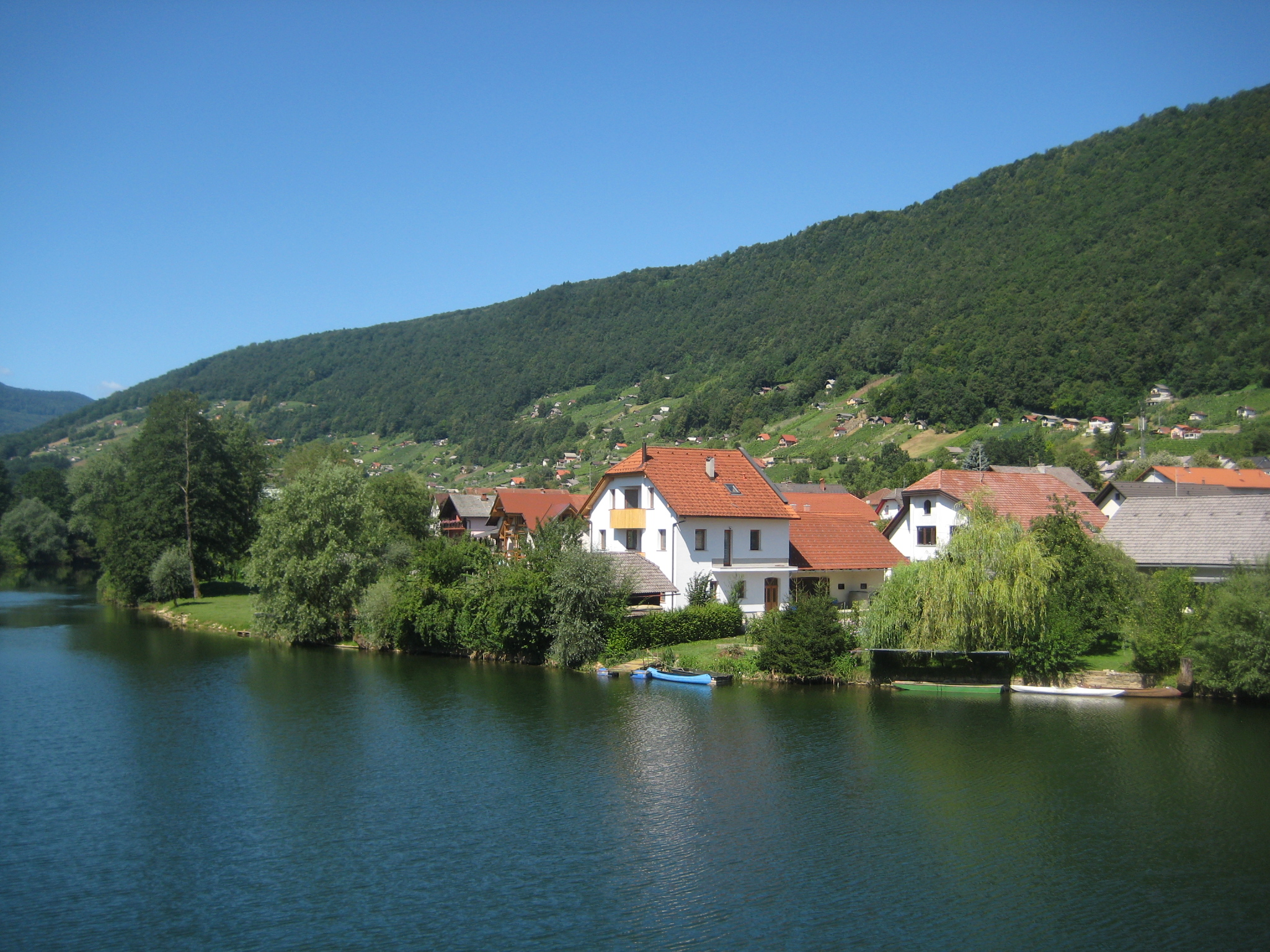

- Location in Slovenia
- Coordinates: 45°47′10.9″N 15°4′28.04″E
- Country: Slovenia
- Traditional region: Lower Carniola
- Statistical region: Southeast Slovenia
- Municipality: Straža

Area
  - Total: 7.26 km^{2} (2.80 sq mi)
- Elevation: 170.8 m (560 ft)

Population (2021)
  - Total: 1,945

Straža (pronounced [ˈstɾaːʒa]) is a settlement on the left bank of the Krka River in the traditional region of Lower Carniola in southeastern Slovenia. It is the largest settlement and the centre of the Municipality of Straža and is included in the Southeast Slovenia Statistical Region. It has close to 2,000 inhabitants. The main employer in the town was the company Novoles. There are many vineyards in the area.

== Geography ==
Straža lies on the left bank of the Krka River. The main part of the town is the former village of Gornja Straža (in older sources Gorenja Straža, German: Oberstrascha), which was joined with former village of Dolnja Straža (in older sources Dolenja Straža, German: Unterstrascha) to the northeast to create today's settlement.

There are two churches in Straža: Assumption Church in Dolenja Straža, which is part of the Parish of Prečna, and St. Thomas's Church in Gorenja Straža, which is part of the Parish of Vavta Vas.

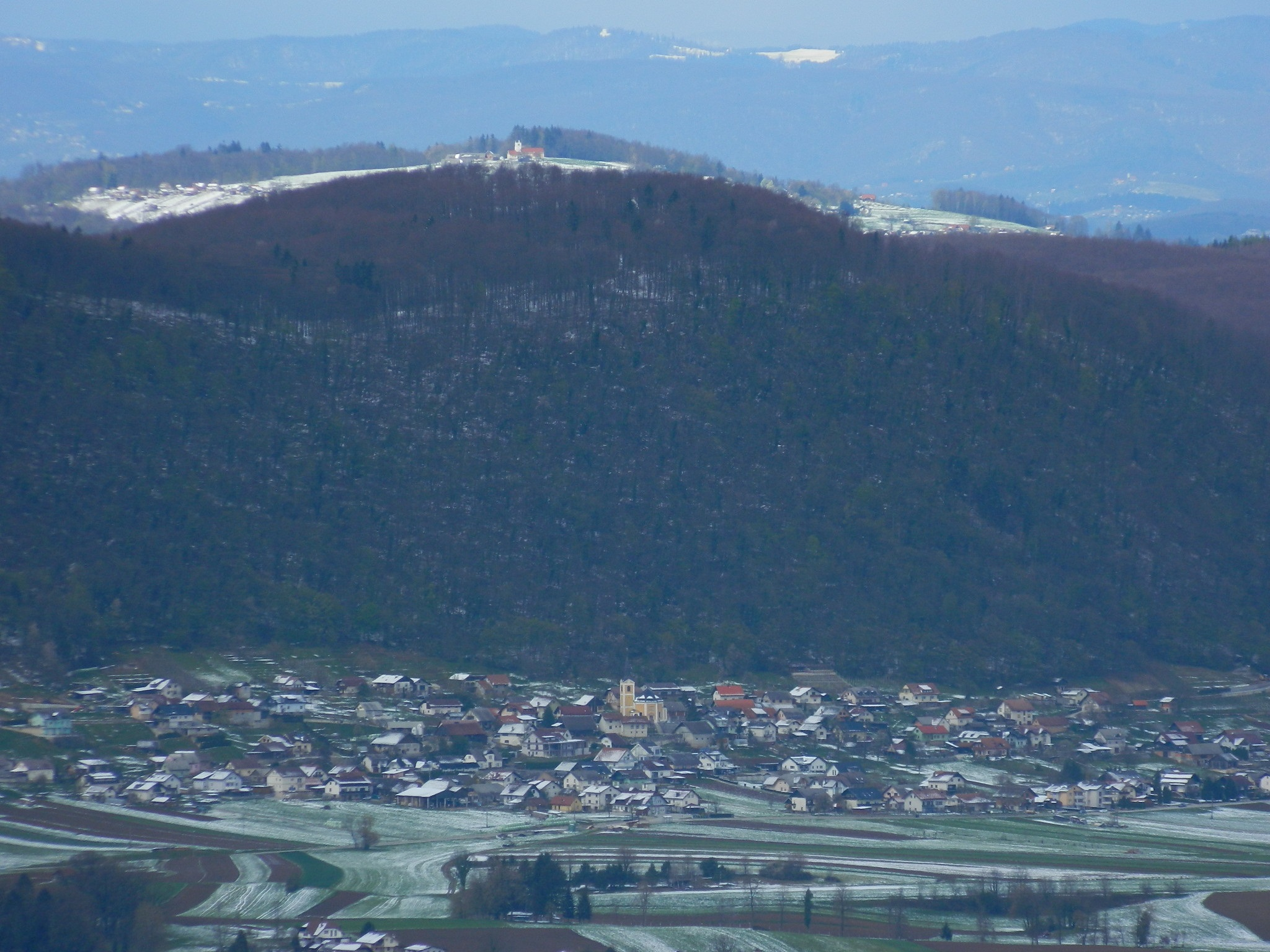
Assumption Church in Dolenja Straža

== Name ==
The name Straža is shared with several other settlements in Slovenia, and it is also found in various toponyms, oronyms, and hydronyms. It is derived from the common noun straža 'guards, guard post', often referring to a place where watch was kept during the danger of Ottoman attacks.
