= Zalog =

Zalog may refer to:

- Zalog (Ljubljana), formerly independent settlement in the eastern part of the capital Ljubljana in central Slovenia
- Zalog, Kranj, small settlement in the hills north of Kranj in the Upper Carniola region of Slovenia
- Zalog, Straža, village in the Municipality of Straža in southeastern Slovenia
