= Rumanja Vas =

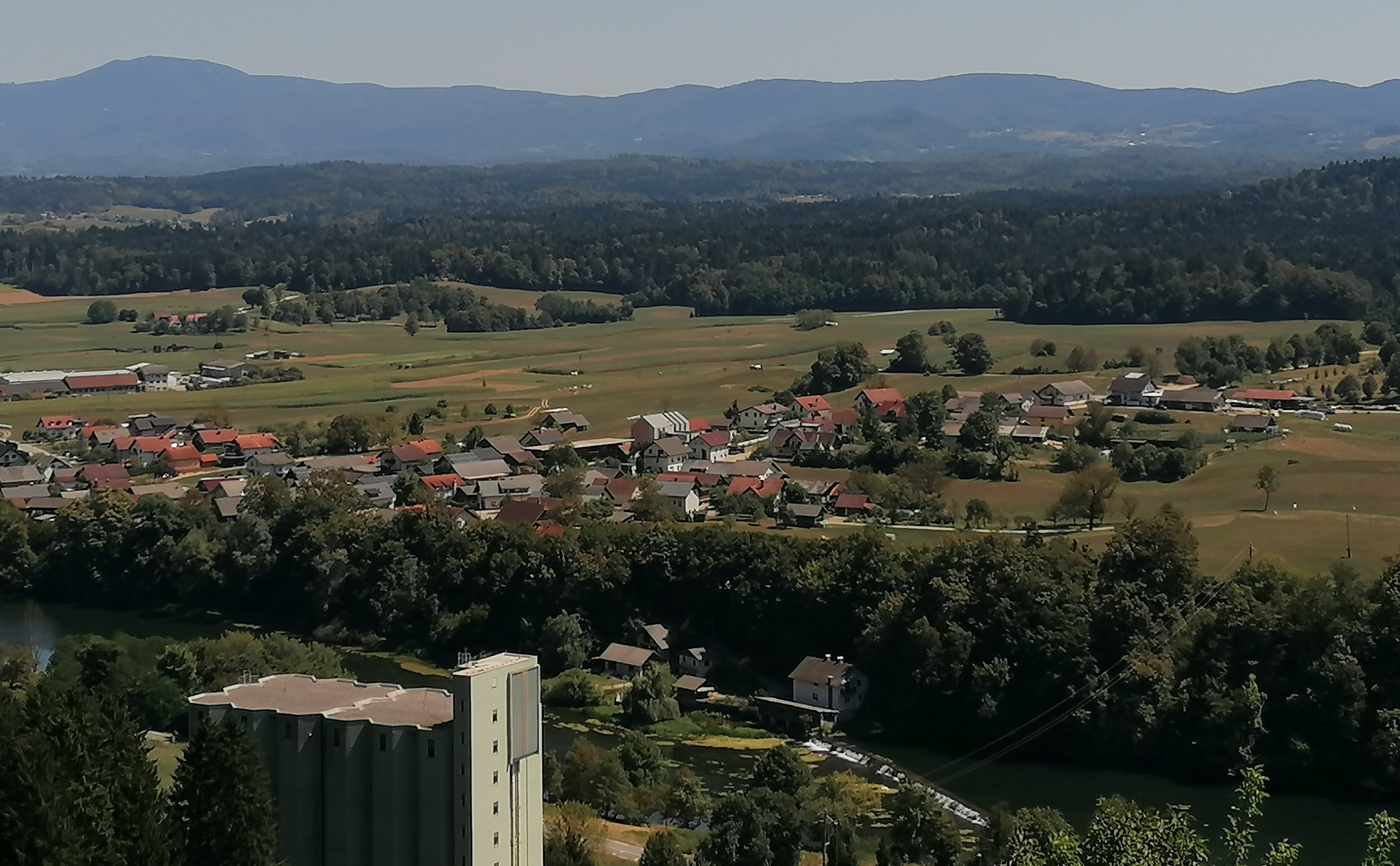

- Location in Slovenia
- Coordinates: 45°46′40.79″N 15°3′56.05″E
- Country: Slovenia
- Traditional region: Lower Carniola
- Statistical region: Southeast Slovenia
- Municipality: Straža

Area
  - Total: 2.87 km^{2} (1.11 sq mi)
- Elevation: 186.2 m (611 ft)

Population (2002)
  - Total: 258

Rumanja Vas (pronounced [ˈɾuːmanja ˈʋaːs]; in older sources also Romanja vas, German: Rumannsdorf) is a village in the Municipality of Straža in southeastern Slovenia. It lies on the right bank of the Krka River on the regional road from Dolenjske Toplice to Novo Mesto. The area is part of the historical region of Lower Carniola. The municipality is now included in the Southeast Slovenia Statistical Region.
