= Vavpča Vas pri Dobrniču =

- Location in Slovenia
- Coordinates: 45°53′17.02″N 14°58′20.7″E
- Country: Slovenia
- Traditional region: Lower Carniola
- Statistical region: Southeast Slovenia
- Municipality: Trebnje

Area
  - Total: 2.1 km^{2} (0.81 sq mi)
- Elevation: 261.9 m (859 ft)

Population (2002)
  - Total: 47

Vavpča Vas pri Dobrniču (pronounced [ˈʋaːu̯ptʃa ˈʋaːs pɾi ˈdoːbəɾnitʃu]; Slovene: Vavpča vas pri Dobrniču) is a settlement in the Municipality of Trebnje in eastern Slovenia. It lies in a small valley north of Dobrnič. The area is part of the traditional region of Lower Carniola. The municipality is now included in the Southeast Slovenia Statistical Region.

== Name ==
The name of the settlement was changed from Vavpča vas to Vavpča vas pri Dobrniču (literally, 'Vavpča Vas near Dobrnič') in 1955. The settlement was first mentioned in written sources in 1335 as Amanstorf (and as Amannstorf in 1383, and Ambtmansdorf in 1467). The Slovene name is derived from *Valp(o)ťa vas, literally 'reeve's village', from the Slovene common noun valpot 'chief steward at a manor' (borrowed from Old High German waltboto 'ruler's deputy'). The medieval German attestations of the name are based on the Middle High German word amman or ambetman 'steward'. Compare also Vavta vas.
