= Schrottenturn Manor =

Coordinates: 46°14′7.47″N 14°20′21.34″E

- Šrotenturn; Grad Schrottenturn; Detelova graščina
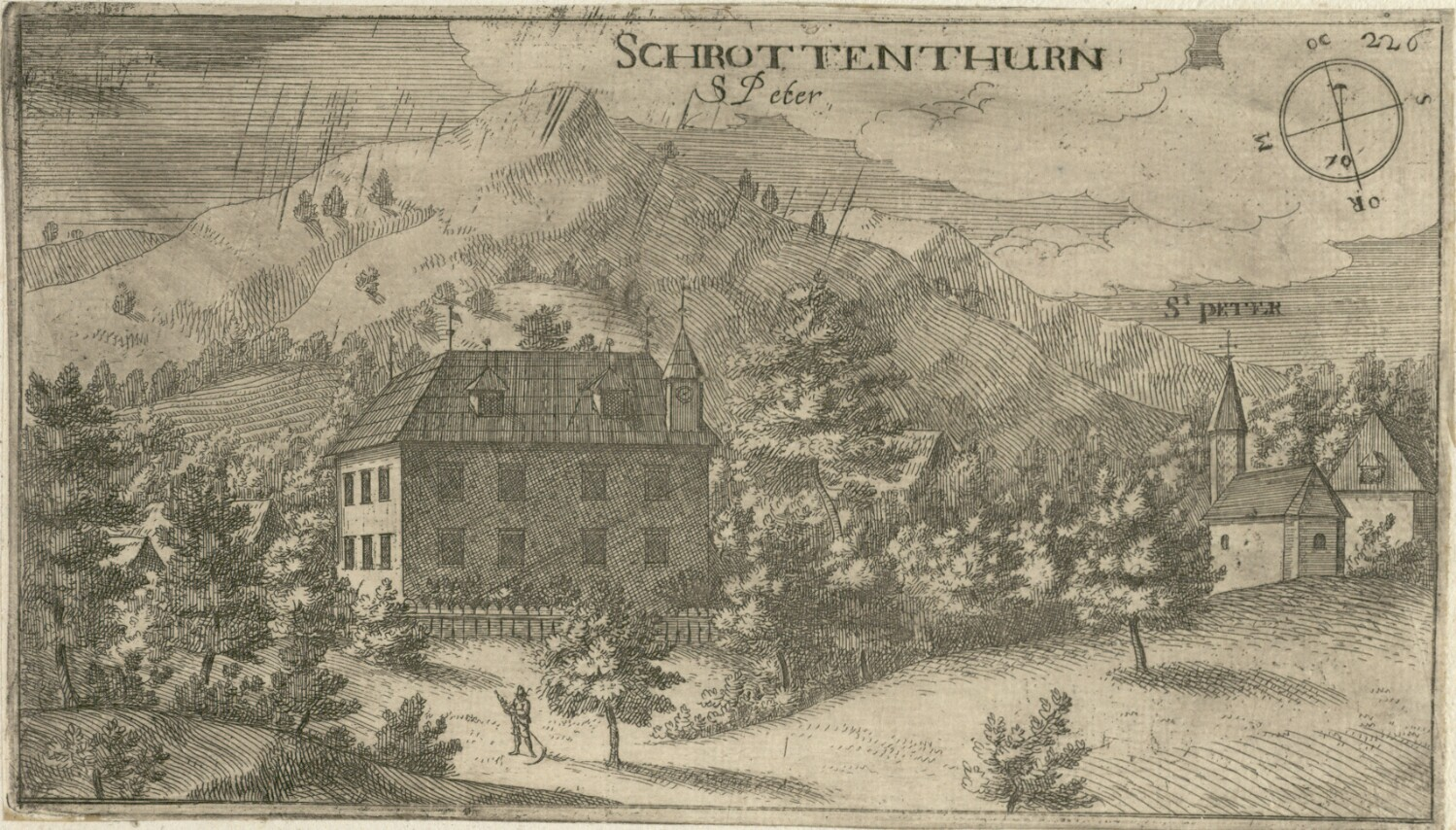
- Interactive map of the Schrottenturn Manor area
- Alternative names: Detel Manor

General information
- Location: Kranj, Slovenija

The Schrottenturn Manor (Slovene: Šrotenturn, Grad Schrottenturn) is a manor in Stražišče, a neighborhood of the town of Kranj in northwestern Slovenia. It was built or owned in the 16th century by the Schrott family. In 1902, it was bought by the politician Oto von Detela and became known as the Detela Manor (Slovene: Detelova graščina). Since World War II, it has been used as a residential building.
