= Podgora, Straža =

Podgora
- Location in Slovenia
- Coordinates: 45°48′25.65″N 15°5′59.38″E
- Country: Slovenia
- Traditional region: Lower Carniola
- Statistical region: Southeast Slovenia
- Municipality: Straža

Area
  - Total: 2.73 km^{2} (1.05 sq mi)
- Elevation: 184.3 m (605 ft)

Population (2002)
  - Total: 173

Podgora (pronounced [pɔdˈɡɔːɾa]) is a settlement in the Municipality of Straža in southeastern Slovenia. The municipality is included in the Southeast Slovenia Statistical Region. The entire area is part of the historical region of Lower Carniola.
