= Stražišče, Kranj =

Stražišče
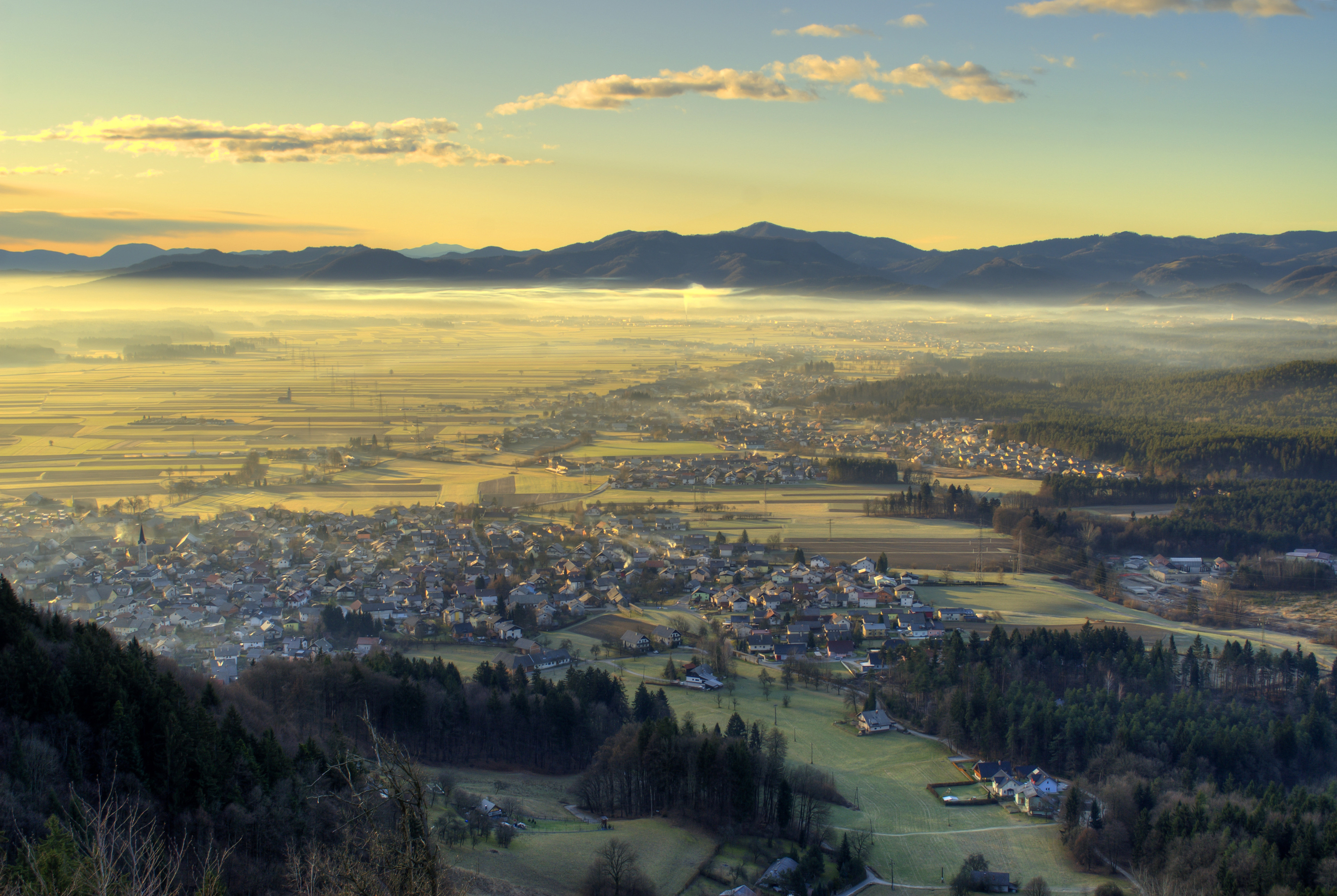
- View of Stražišče from Šmarjetna Gora above Kranj, with Spodnje Bitnje in the background

- Location in Slovenia
- Coordinates: 46°13′52.11″N 14°20′31.32″E
- Country: Slovenia
- Traditional region: Upper Carniola
- Statistical region: Upper Carniola
- Municipality: Kranj
- Elevation: 397 m (1,302 ft)

Stražišče (pronounced [stɾaˈʒiːʃtʃɛ]; German: Straschische) is a former settlement in the Municipality of Kranj in the Upper Carniola region of Slovenia. It is now part of the city of Kranj. It includes the hamlet of Gaštej (German: Gehesteig).

== Geography ==
Tular Cave lies west of the settlement. The cave was described in 1689 by Johann Weikhard von Valvasor and has natural populations of the amphipod crustacean Niphargus ilidzensis slovenicus and the ground beetle Anophthalmus micklitzi . During the Second World War, a large part of the cave was converted into an air raid shelter for a nearby factory. The shelter was converted into the Tular Cave Laboratory (Jamski laboratorij Tular) in 1960.

== Name ==
The name Stražišče, like similar names (e.g., Straža, Straže, Stražica, etc.) is derived from the Slovene common noun straža 'guards' or 'guard post'. Such names are often applied to settlements near hills or mountains where warning fires were lit to warn against Ottoman attacks. Such Slovene names are often paralleled by German names containing the root Wart(e) 'guard, watch'; in this case, Wartenburg Castle stood on a cliff below neighboring Šmarjetna Gora. In the past the German name was Straschische.

== History ==
Stražišče was deeded to Freising Bishop Gottschalk in 1002 by Emperor Henry II. In 1291 it came under Bavarian control and had 17 farms. Stražišče was known for sieve-making in the 16th century; sieves from the village were exported to Italy, France, Belgium, Holland, Germany, Greece, and other destinations, and the horsehair for their manufacture was imported from as far away as France, Russia, Wallachia, and Serbia. Industrialization of sieve-making and also linen production was carried out in the 18th century. Stražišče was annexed by the city of Kranj in 1957, ending its existence as a separate settlement.

== Churches ==
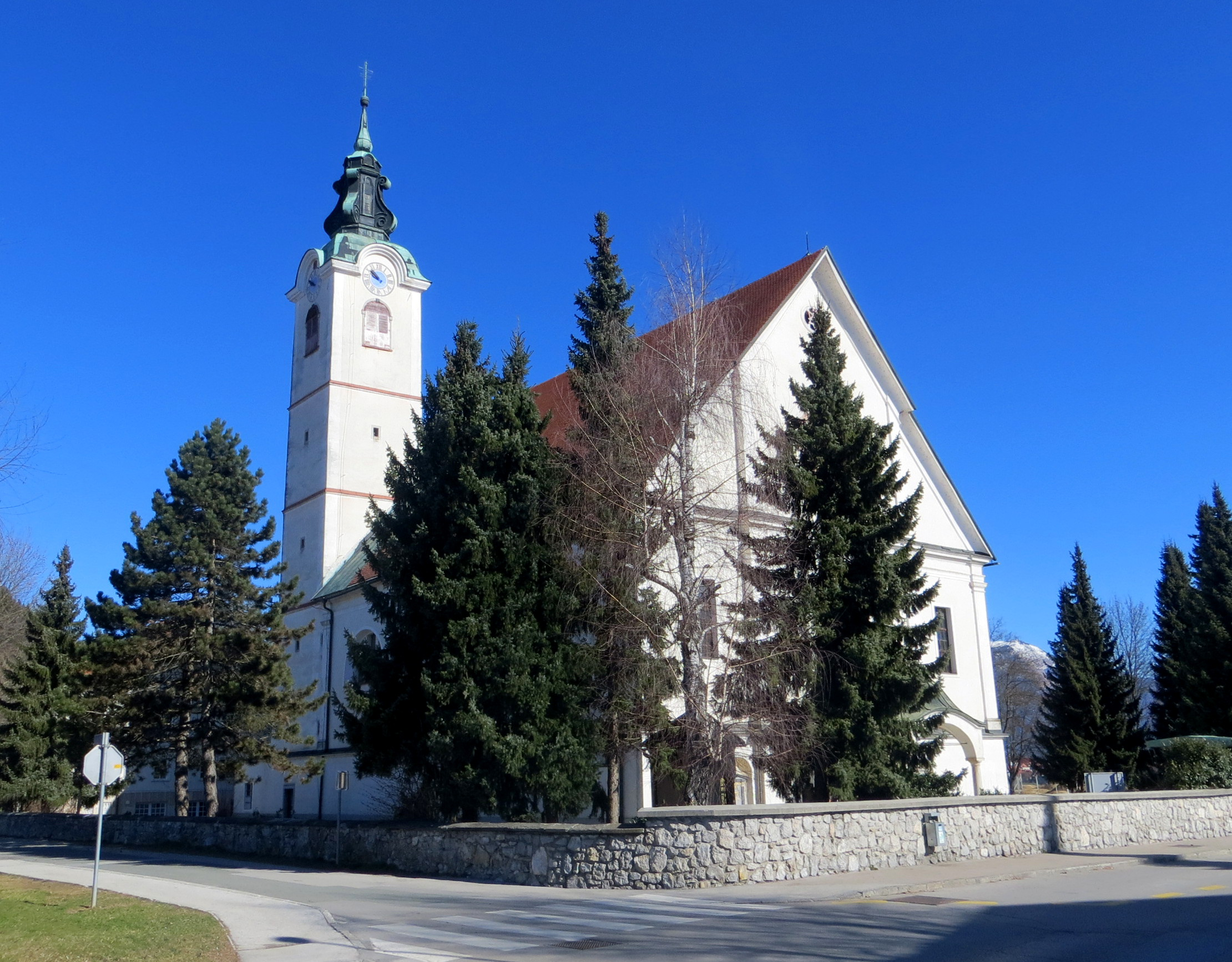
Saint Martin's Church

The chapel of ease in Stražišče dedicated to Saint Bartholomew (Slovene: sveti Jernej) was first mentioned in a visitation record in 1631. It was remodeled several times. The bell tower dates from 1734 and the church contains paintings from 1865 by Janez Wolf (1825–1884). The parish church is dedicated to Saint Martin. The original parish church stood next to the Sava River near the current railroad station, along the old Roman road, and was built during an epidemic. It was razed and replaced by the current church in 1735, attributed to the builder Matija Maček (c. 1657–1737) from the Poljane Valley. The church features a Gothic Pietà and Baroque furnishings by Valentin Metzinger, Leopold Layer, Jožef Egartner, Matevž Langus, and Michael Stroy. Saint Martin's Parish was established very early; a parish priest named Arnold was mentioned in 1163, and Filip in 1248.

== Notable people ==
Notable people that were born or lived in Stražišče include:

- Ivan Bajželj (1877–1937), physical education specialist
- Valentin Burnik (1851–1924), journalist
- Benvenut Krobat (1805–1800), religious writer
- Valter Schmid (1875–1951), archaeologist
- Lovro Tepina (1882–1925), veterinary specialist
