= Dolnje Mraševo =

- Location in Slovenia
- Coordinates: 45°45′57.58″N 15°6′44.47″E
- Country: Slovenia
- Traditional region: Lower Carniola
- Statistical region: Southeast Slovenia
- Municipality: Straža

Area
  - Total: 1.92 km^{2} (0.74 sq mi)
- Elevation: 202.8 m (665 ft)

Population (2002)
  - Total: 29

Dolnje Mraševo (pronounced [ˈdoːlnjɛ ˈmɾaːʃɛʋɔ]) is a small village in the Municipality of Straža in southeastern Slovenia. The area is part of the historical region of Lower Carniola. The municipality is now included in the Southeast Slovenia Statistical Region.
