= Loke, Straža =

Loke
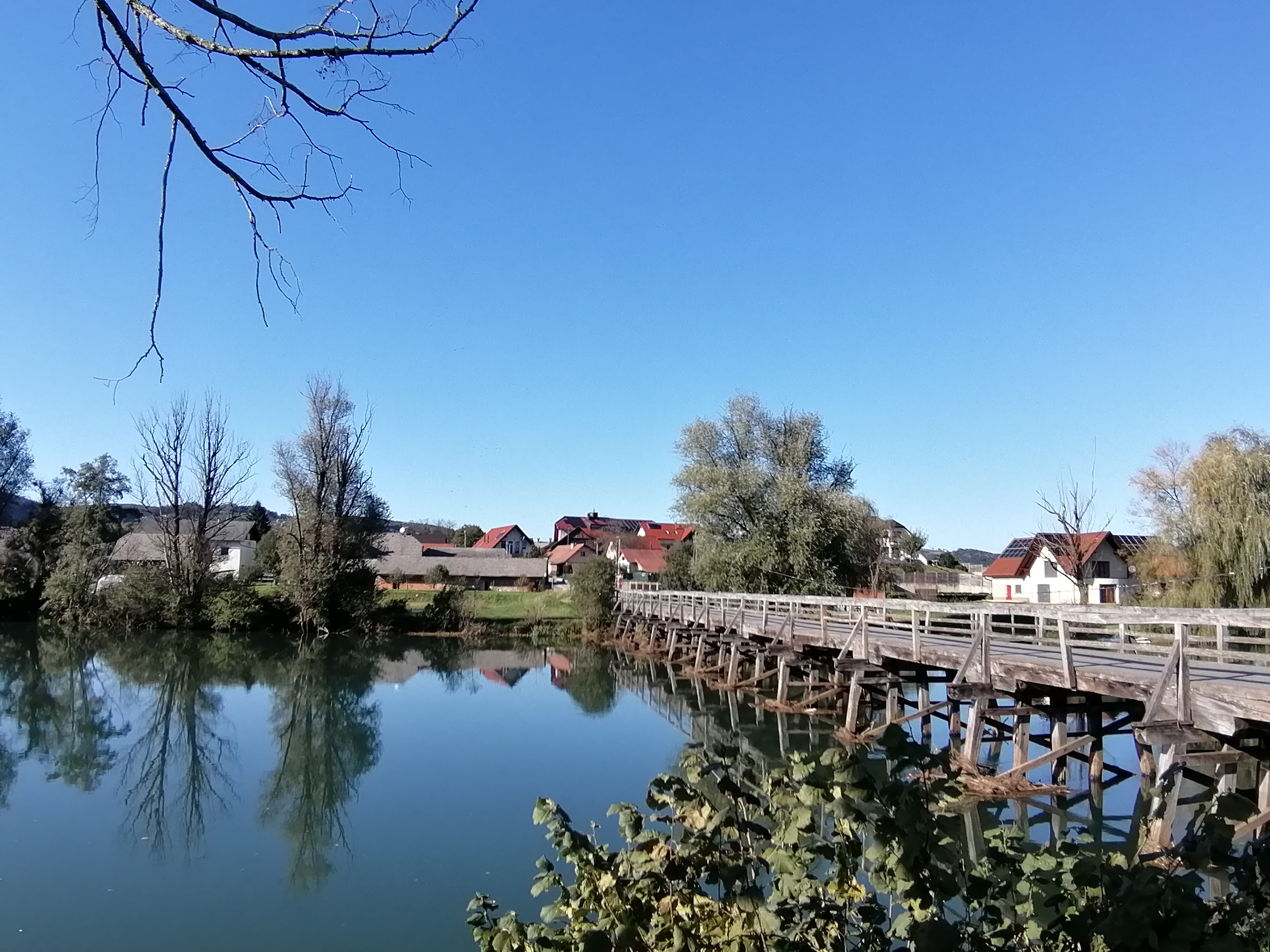
- Wooden bridge on the Krka River at Loke

- Location in Slovenia
- Coordinates: 45°47′23.45″N 15°6′39.6″E
- Country: Slovenia
- Traditional region: Lower Carniola
- Statistical region: Southeast Slovenia
- Municipality: Straža

Area
  - Total: 0.37 km^{2} (0.14 sq mi)
- Elevation: 170.8 m (560 ft)

Population (2002)
  - Total: 61

Loke (pronounced [ˈloːkɛ]) is a small settlement on the left bank of the Krka River in the Municipality of Straža in southeastern Slovenia. The area is part of the traditional region of Lower Carniola. The municipality is now included in the Southeast Slovenia Statistical Region.

== Name ==
The toponym Loke is relatively frequent in Slovenia. It is the plural form of the Slovene common noun loka 'swampy meadow', from Proto-Slavic *lǫka 'swampy, flood-prone meadow', semantically derived from 'meander'. Toponyms of the same origin are also found in other Slavic countries (e.g., Polish Łąka, Serbian Luka, Bulgarian Shiroka Laka, etc.).
