= Potok, Straža =

Potok Potok pri Gorenji Straži (1953–1988)
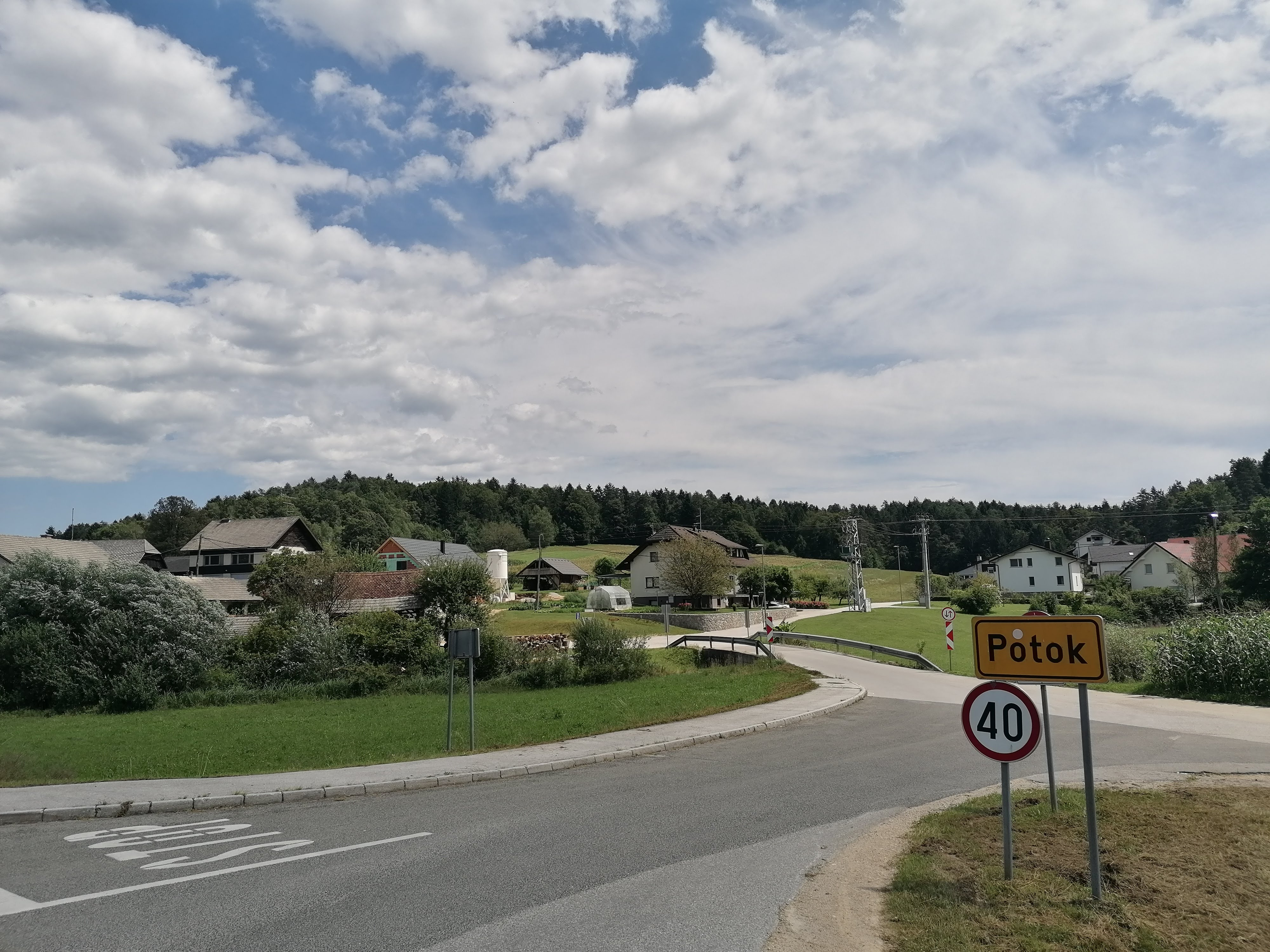

- Location in Slovenia
- Coordinates: 45°47′1.76″N 15°5′59.23″E
- Country: Slovenia
- Traditional region: Lower Carniola
- Statistical region: Southeast Slovenia
- Municipality: Straža

Area
  - Total: 1.1 km^{2} (0.42 sq mi)
- Elevation: 168 m (551 ft)

Population (2002)
  - Total: 211

Potok (pronounced [ˈpɔːtɔk]) is a settlement on the right bank of the Krka River in the Municipality of Straža in the historical region of Lower Carniola of Slovenia. The municipality is now included in the Southeast Slovenia Statistical Region.

== Name ==
The name of the settlement literally means 'creek, stream'. Potok Creek, a tributary of the Krka River, flows through the village. The name of the settlement was changed from Potok to Potok pri Gorenji Straži in 1953. The name was changed back to Potok in 1988.
