= Brezova Reber pri Dvoru =

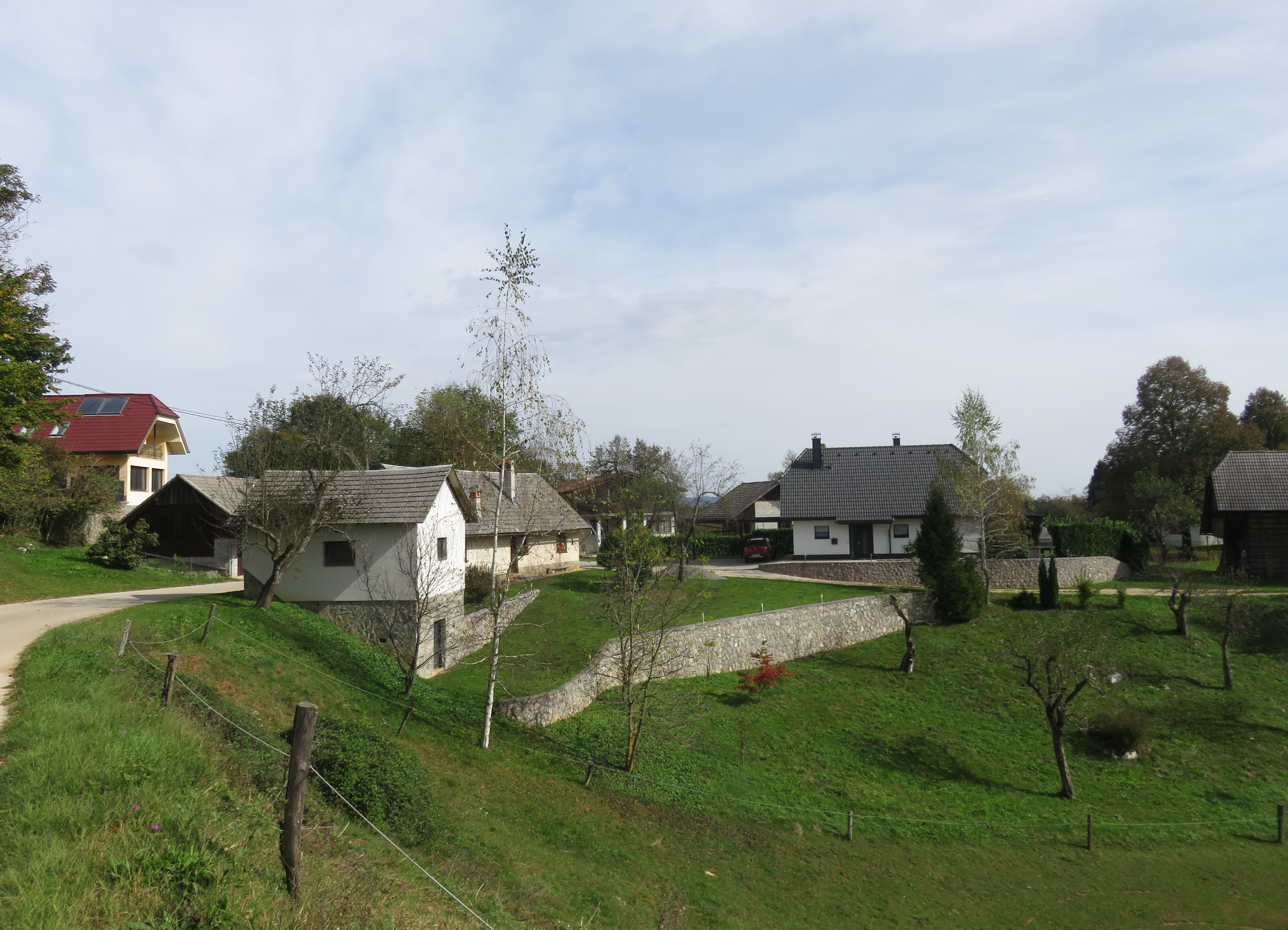

- Location in Slovenia
- Coordinates: 45°49′3.36″N 15°2′48.12″E
- Country: Slovenia
- Traditional region: Lower Carniola
- Statistical region: Southeast Slovenia
- Municipality: Žužemberk

Area
  - Total: 12.36 km^{2} (4.77 sq mi)
- Elevation: 428.1 m (1,405 ft)

Population (2002)
  - Total: 43

Brezova Reber pri Dvoru (pronounced [ˈbɾeːzɔʋa ˈɾeːbəɾ pɾi ˈdʋɔːɾu], German: Birkenleiten) is a settlement in the Municipality of Žužemberk in southeastern Slovenia. It lies in the hills to the east of Dvor in the historical region of Lower Carniola. The municipality is now included in the Southeast Slovenia Statistical Region.

== Name ==
The name of the settlement was recorded as Pirchleyttenn in 1463 and Pirkhleytten in 1467.

== Cultural heritage ==
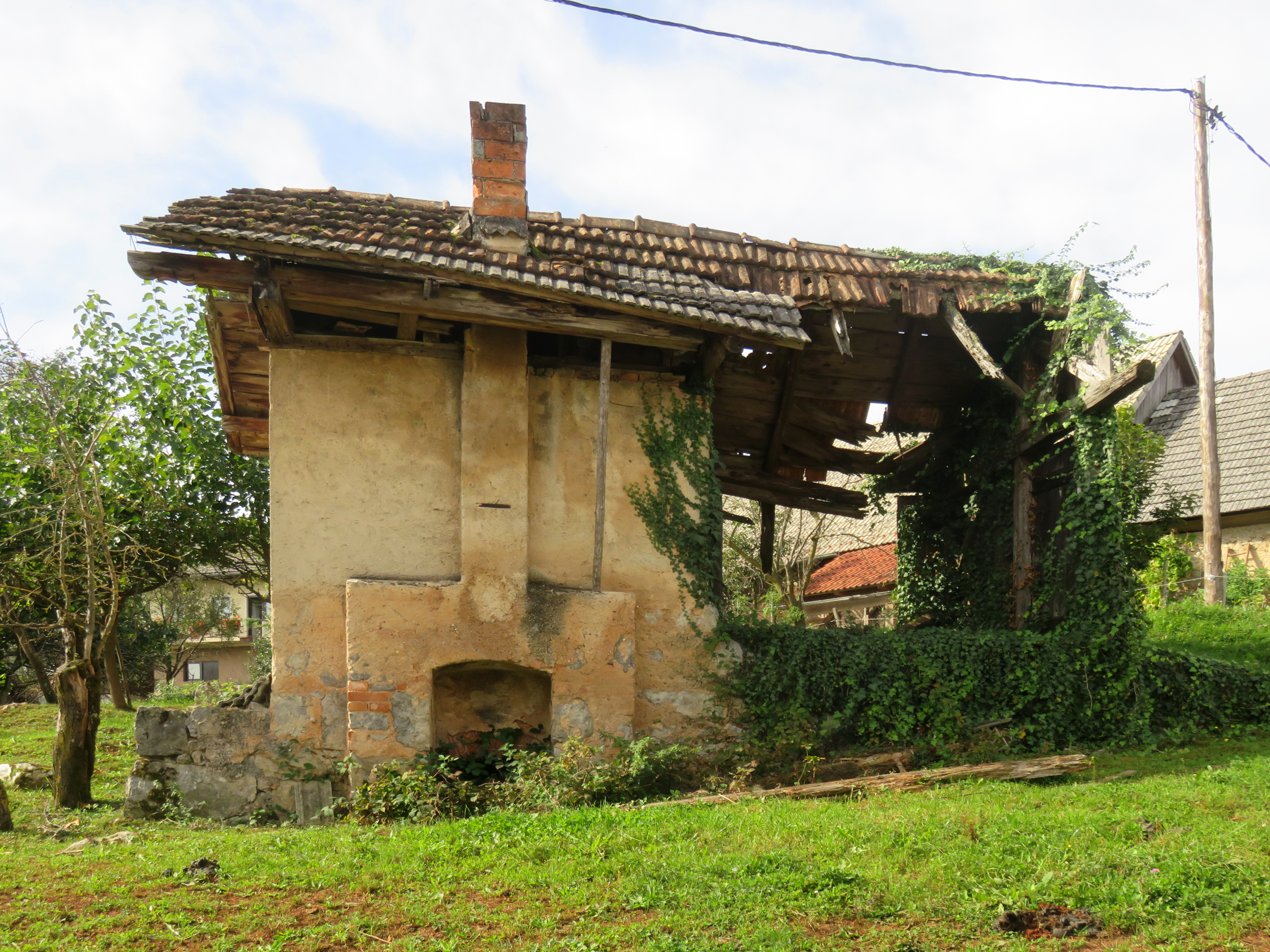
The village drying oven

The village drying oven (Slovene: vaška suševnca) stands in the middle of Brezova Reber pri Dvoru. It was used to dry fruit from 1940 until about 1960. It is a two-room structure; above the vaulted brick oven is the chamber for drying fruit, and there was also a wooden room next to it.
