= Jurka Vas =

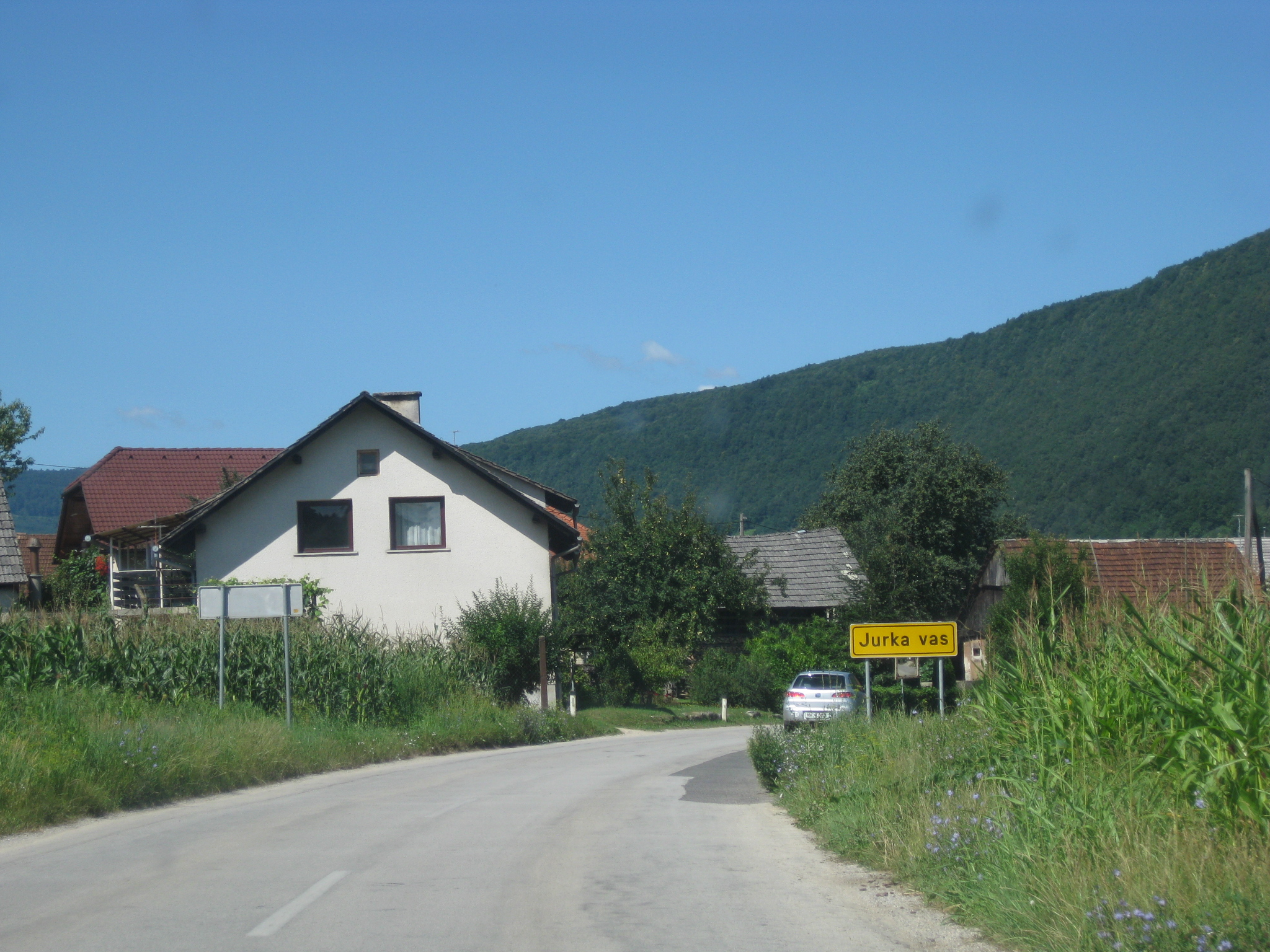

- Location in Slovenia
- Coordinates: 45°47′1.77″N 15°5′40.25″E
- Country: Slovenia
- Traditional region: Lower Carniola
- Statistical region: Southeast Slovenia
- Municipality: Straža

Area
  - Total: 1.22 km^{2} (0.47 sq mi)
- Elevation: 170.9 m (561 ft)

Population (2002)
  - Total: 162

Jurka Vas (pronounced [ˈjuːɾka ˈʋaːs]; Slovene: Jurka vas) is a village on the right bank of the Krka River in the Municipality of Straža in southeastern Slovenia. The area is part of the historical region of Lower Carniola. The municipality is now included in the Southeast Slovenia Statistical Region.
