= Češča Vas =

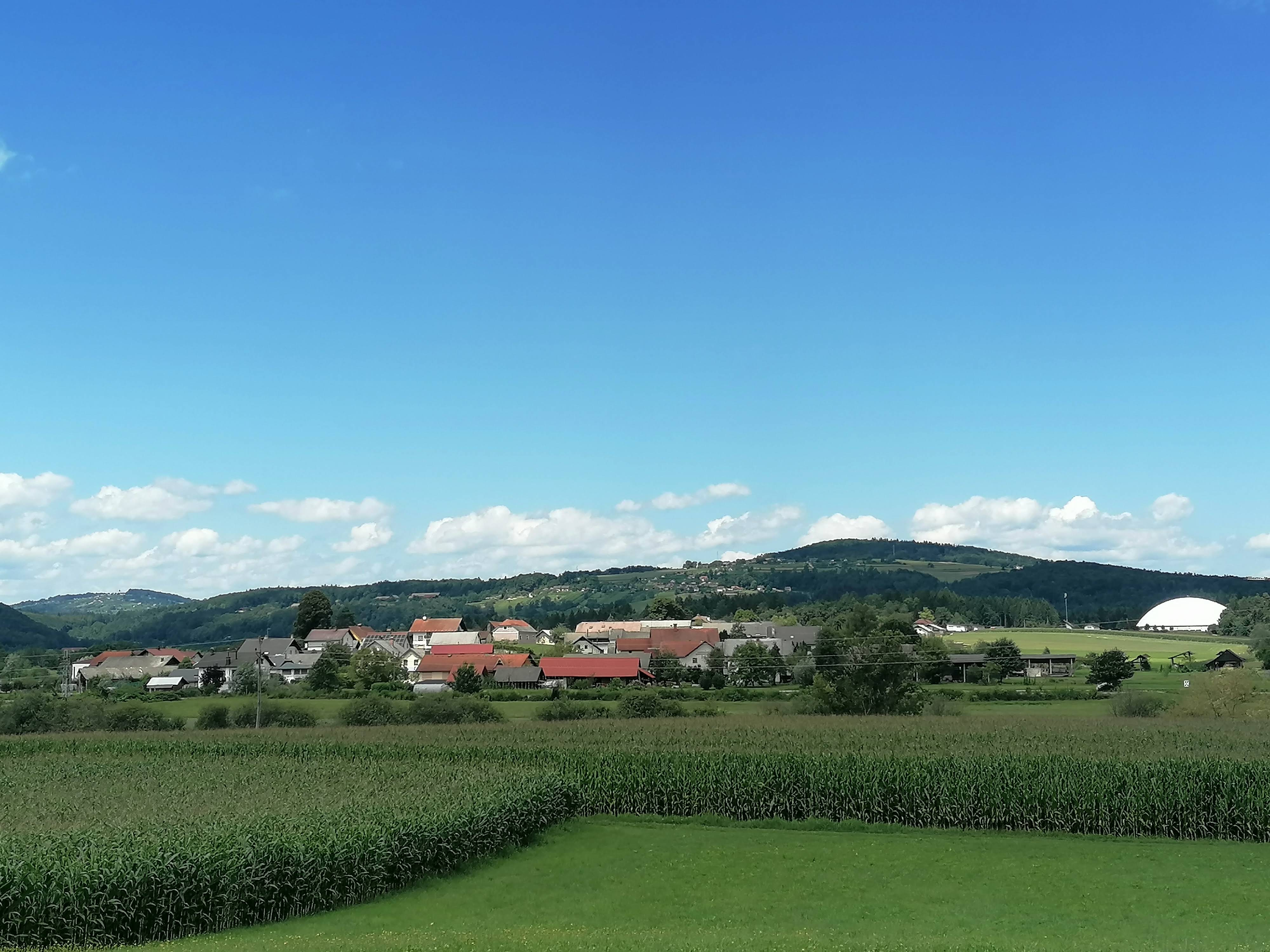

- Location in Slovenia
- Coordinates: 45°47′48.63″N 15°7′36.57″E
- Country: Slovenia
- Traditional region: Lower Carniola
- Statistical region: Southeast Slovenia
- Municipality: Novo Mesto

Area
  - Total: 1.638 km^{2} (0.632 sq mi)
- Elevation: 168.7 m (553 ft)

Population (2026)
  - Total: 140
  - Density: 86/km^{2} (220/sq mi)
- Postal code: 8000

Češča Vas (pronounced [ˈtʃeːʃtʃa ˈʋaːs]; Slovene: Češča vas) is a settlement on the left bank of the Krka River in the City Municipality of Novo Mesto in southeastern Slovenia. The entire municipality is part of the traditional region of Lower Carniola and is now included in the Southeast Slovenia Statistical Region. In January 2026, the population was 140.

The Novo Mesto Olympic Center (Slovene: Olimpijski center Novo mesto), which includes a velodrome, athletics venue, and swimming pool, is located in Češča Vas.

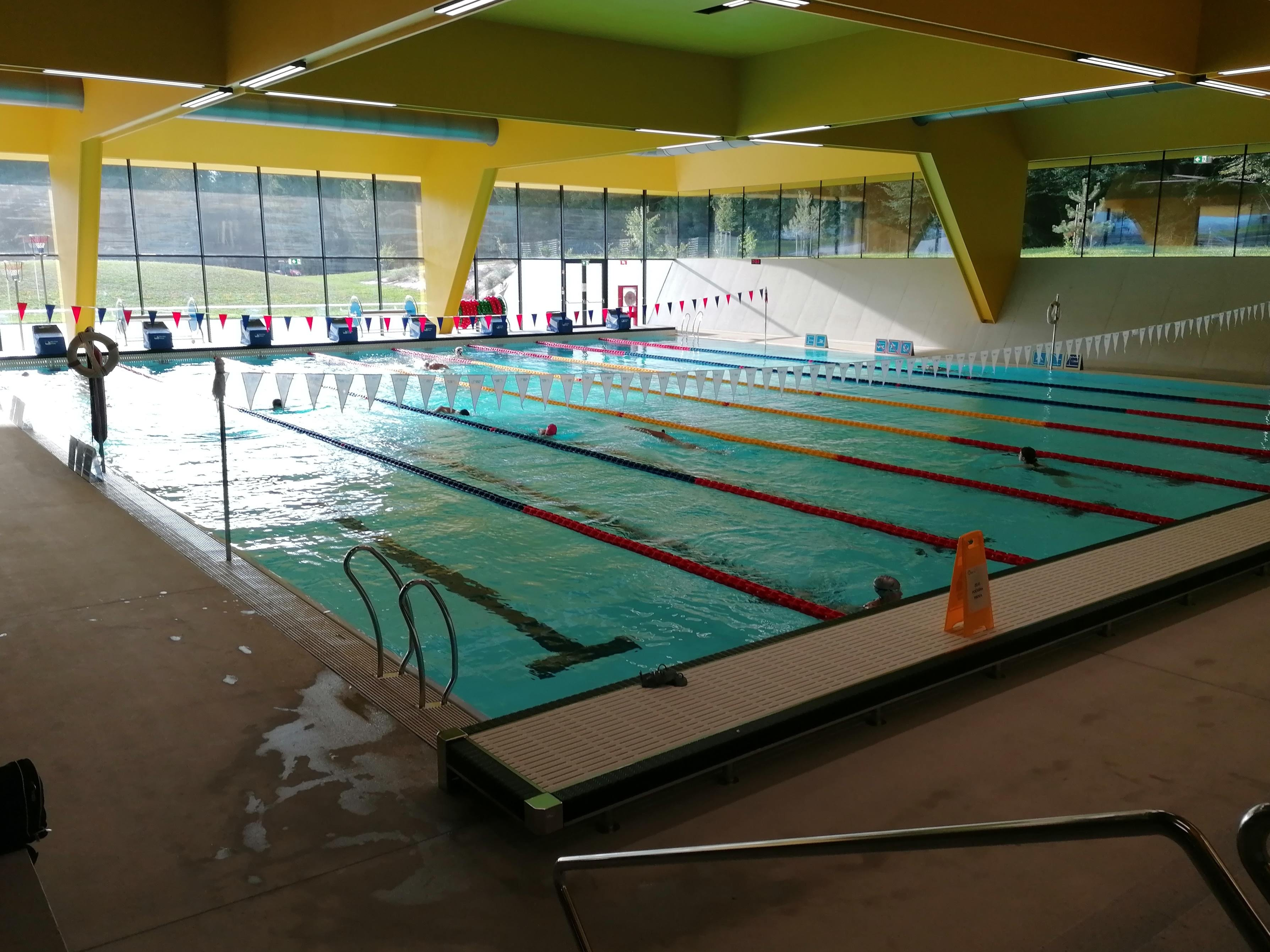
Swimming pool

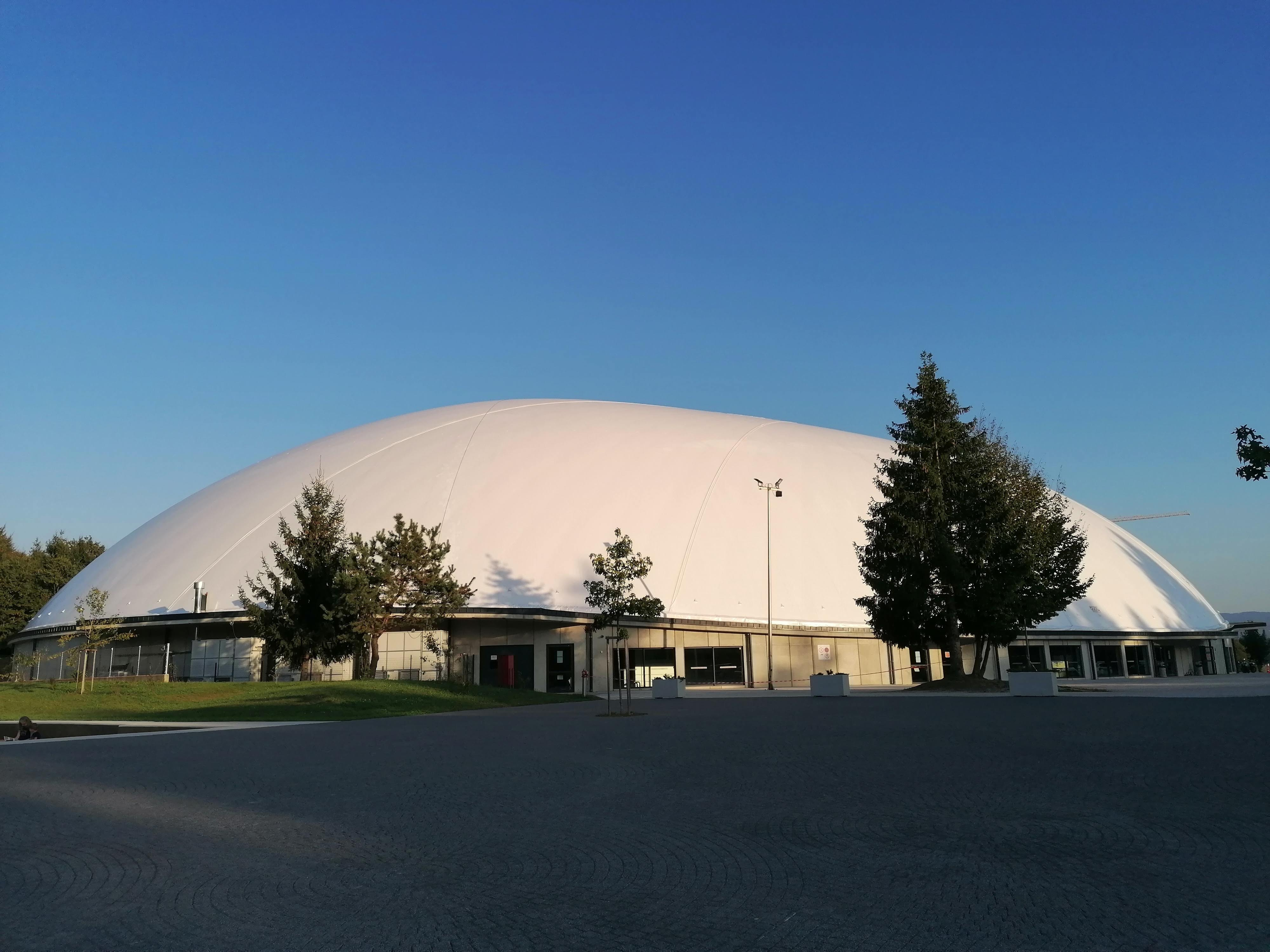
Velodrome
