= Zagorica nad Kamnikom =

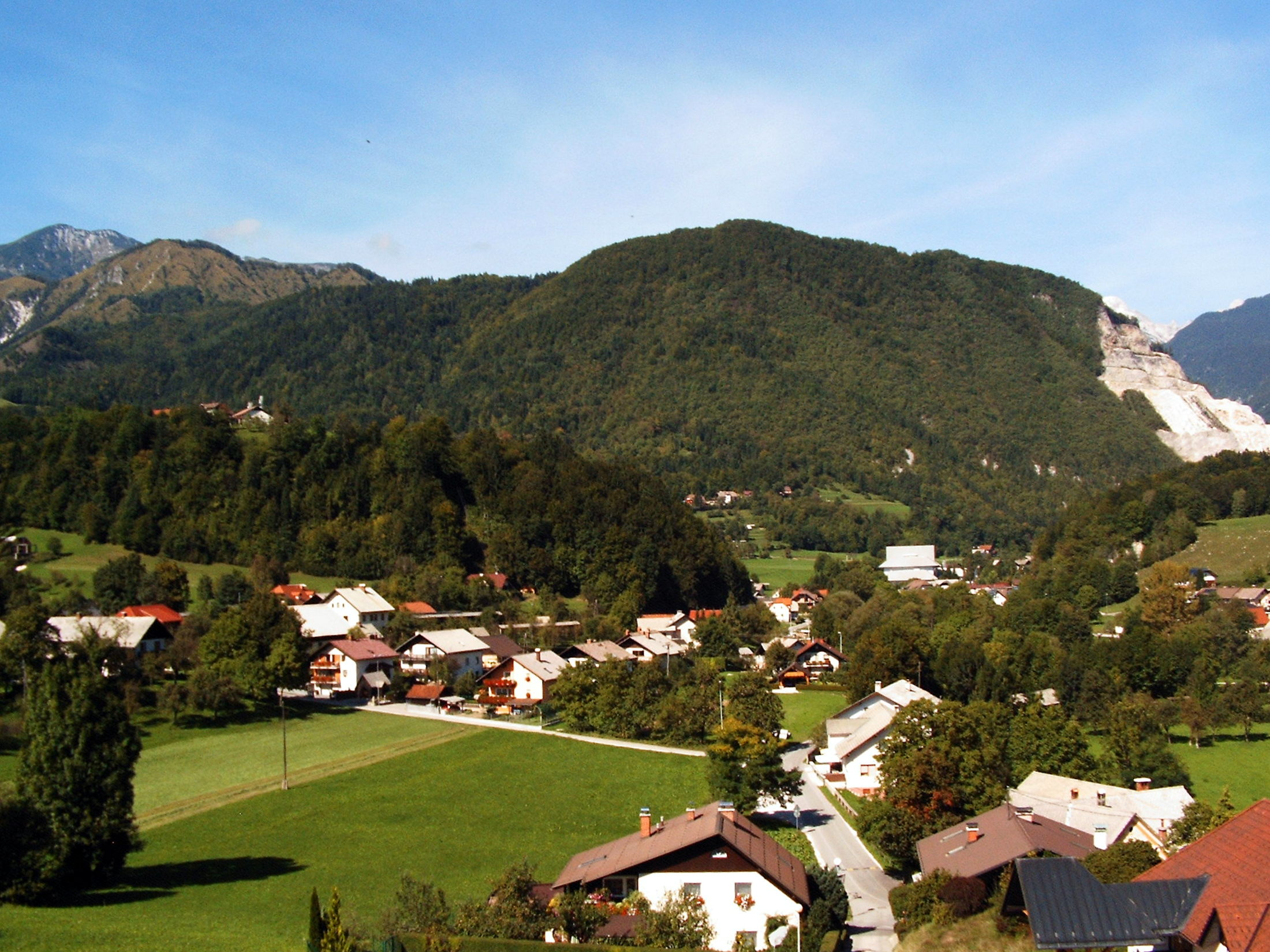

- Location in Slovenia
- Coordinates: 46°15′38.15″N 14°36′4.97″E
- Country: Slovenia
- Traditional region: Upper Carniola
- Statistical region: Central Slovenia
- Municipality: Kamnik

Area
  - Total: 0.39 km^{2} (0.15 sq mi)
- Elevation: 434.7 m (1,426 ft)

Population (2002)
  - Total: 155

Zagorica nad Kamnikom (pronounced [zaɡɔˈɾiːtsa nat ˈkaːmnikɔm]; German: Sagoritz) is a settlement on the right bank of the Kamnik Bistrica River in the Municipality of Kamnik in the Upper Carniola region of Slovenia.

== Name ==
The name of the settlement was changed from Zagorica to Zagorica nad Kamnikom in 1953. In the past the German name was Sagoritz.

== Church ==
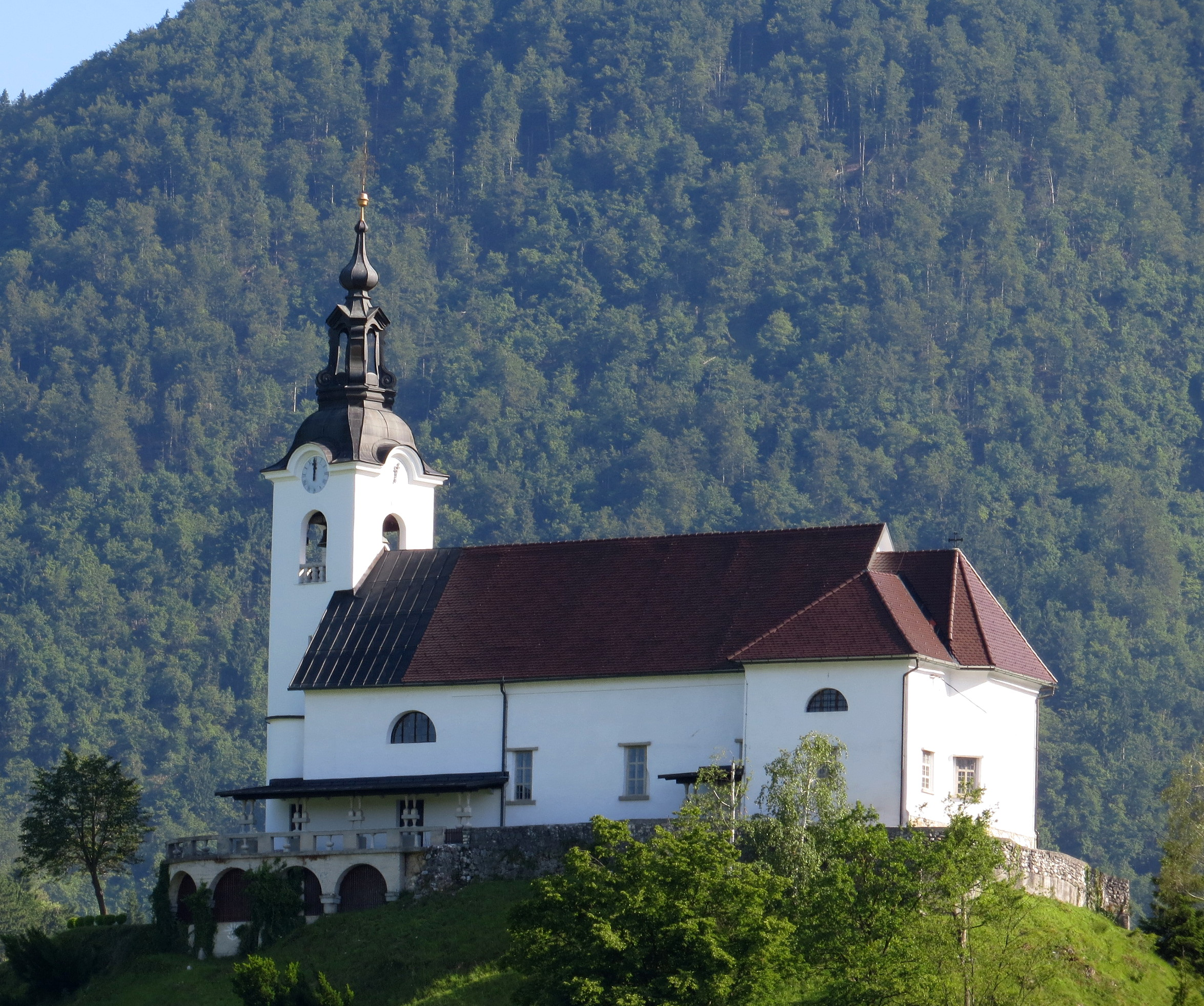
Saint Benedict's Church

The Stranje parish church, dedicated to Saint Benedict, is built on a small hill at the southern end of the settlement. The chapel of Our Lady of the Snows on the Big Pasture Plateau (Slovene: Velika planina) also belongs to this parish.
