= Mali Osolnik =

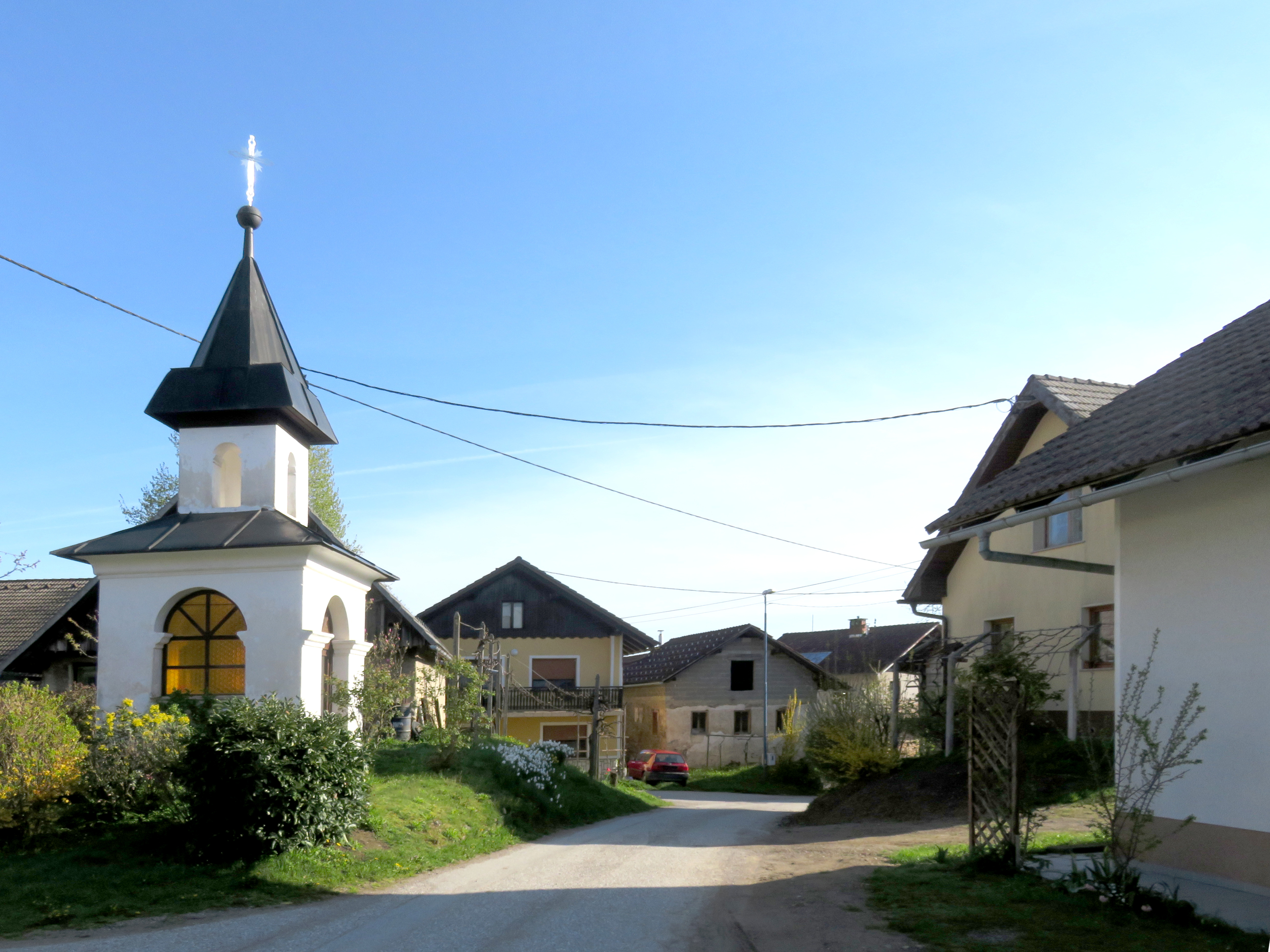

- Location in Slovenia
- Coordinates: 45°51′33.53″N 14°36′18.06″E
- Country: Slovenia
- Traditional region: Lower Carniola
- Statistical region: Central Slovenia
- Municipality: Velike Lašče

Area
  - Total: 1.1 km^{2} (0.42 sq mi)
- Elevation: 568.8 m (1,866 ft)

Population (2002)
  - Total: 49
- Postal code: 1311

Mali Osolnik (pronounced [ˈmaːli ɔˈsoːu̯nik]; German: Kleinosolnik) is a village northwest of Rašica in the Municipality of Velike Lašče in central Slovenia. The entire municipality is part of the traditional region of Lower Carniola and is now included in the Central Slovenia Statistical Region.

== Church ==
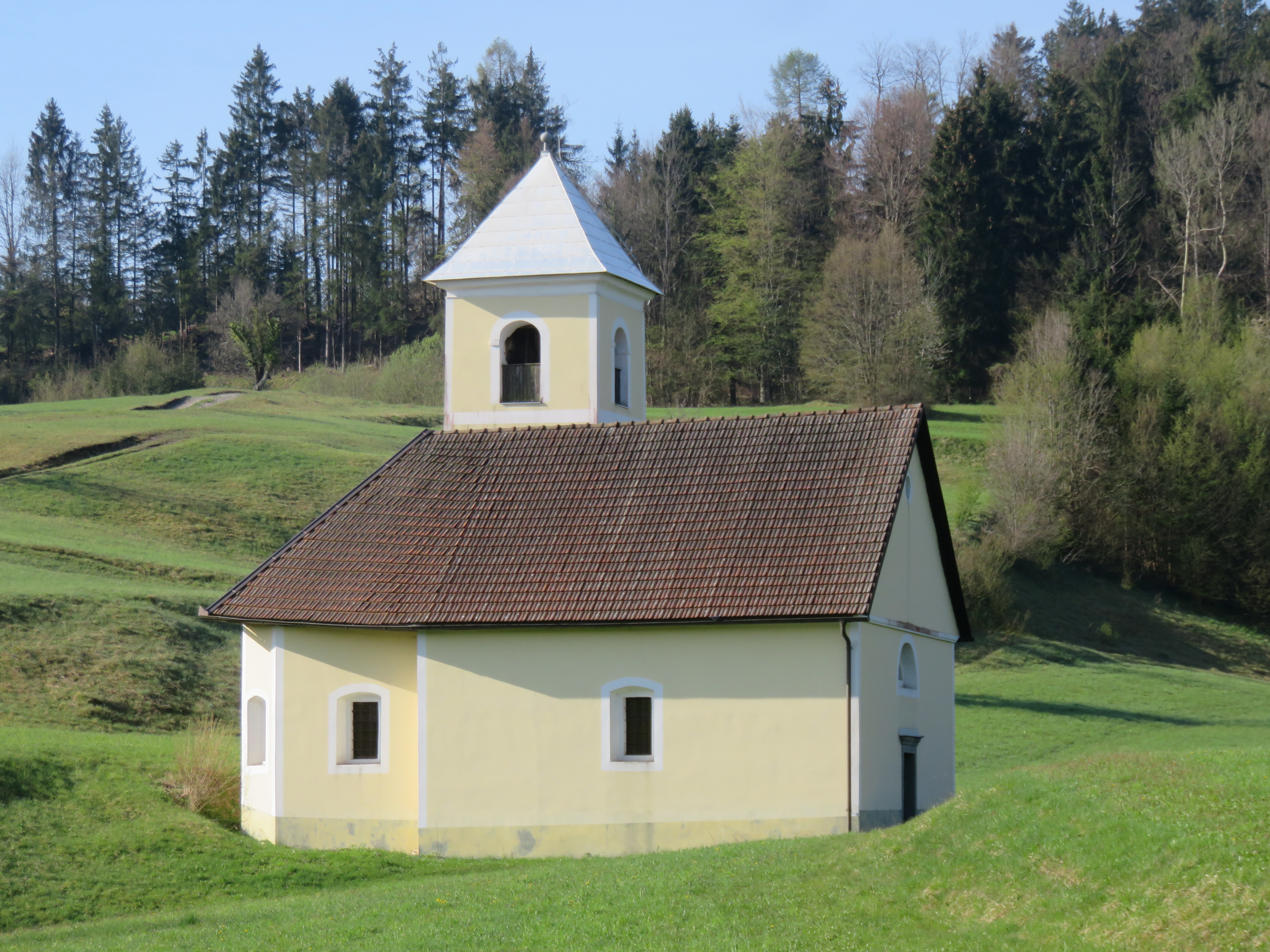
Saint James's Church

The local church, built outside the settlement to the southwest, is dedicated to Saint James (Slovene: sveti Jakob) and belongs to the Parish of Škocjan pri Turjaku. It was built in around 1700.
