= Vavta Vas =

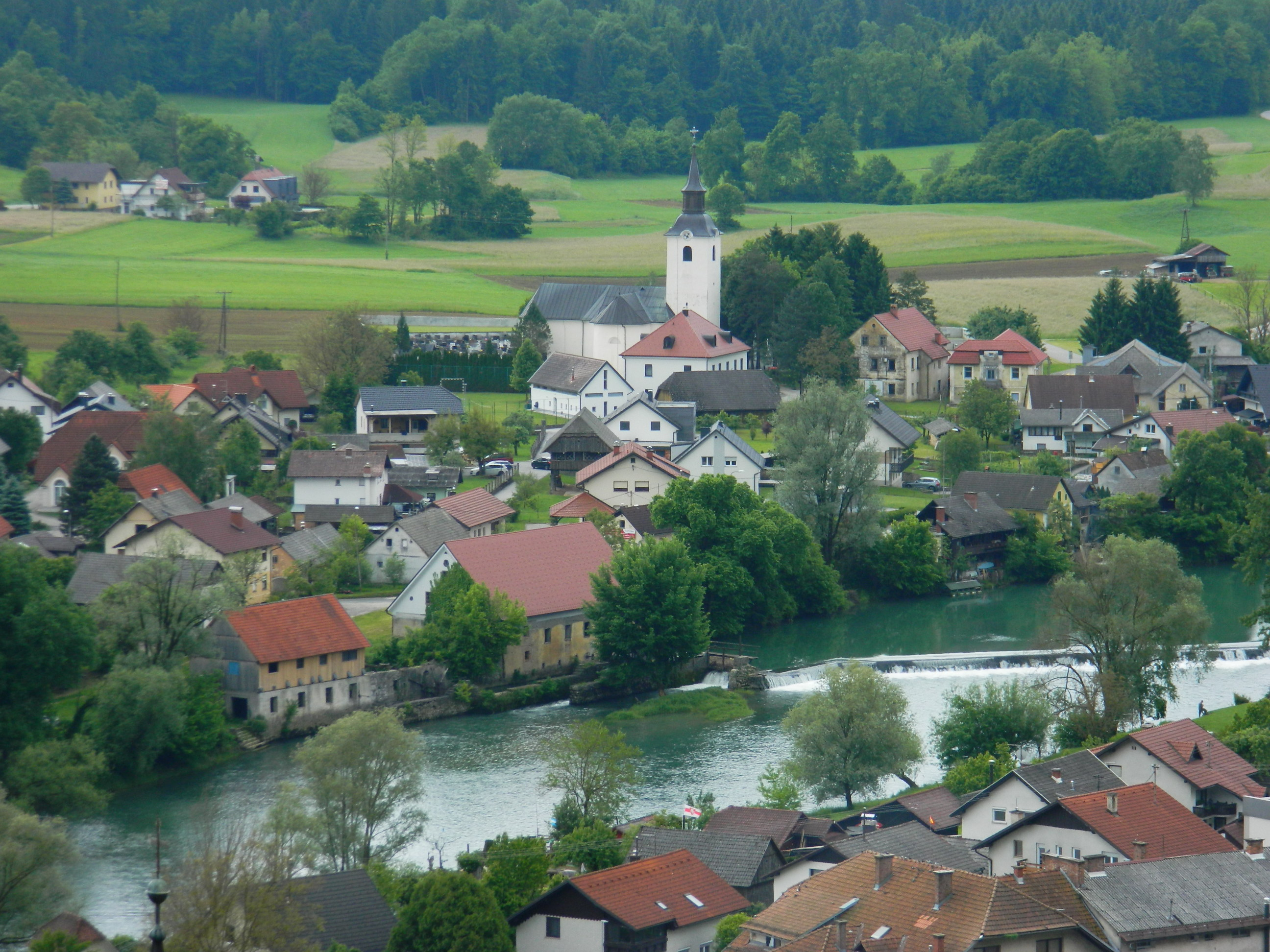
- Vavta Vas with the Dular Mill

- Location in Slovenia
- Coordinates: 45°46′40.11″N 15°4′49.75″E
- Country: Slovenia
- Traditional region: Lower Carniola
- Statistical region: Southeast Slovenia
- Municipality: Straža

Area
  - Total: 2.56 km^{2} (0.99 sq mi)
- Elevation: 179.9 m (590 ft)

Population (2002)
  - Total: 392

Vavta Vas (pronounced [ˈʋaːu̯ta ˈʋaːs]; Slovene: Vavta vas, in older sources also Valta vas; German: Waltendorf) is a village on the right bank of the Krka River in the Municipality of Straža in southeastern Slovenia. The area is part of the historical region of Lower Carniola. The municipality is now included in the Southeast Slovenia Statistical Region. The Dular Mill in the village is represented on the municipal coat of arms.

== Name ==
Vavta Vas was attested in written sources in 1436 as Walpottendorff (and as Waltendorf in 1449 and Waltensdorf in 1465). The medieval names indicate that the Slovene name is derived from *Valpťa vas, literally 'reeve's village', from the Slovene common noun valpot 'chief steward at a manor' (borrowed from Old High German waltboto 'ruler's deputy'). Compare also Vavpča vas.

== Church ==
The local parish church is dedicated to Saint James (Slovene: sveti Jakob) and belongs to the Roman Catholic Diocese of Novo Mesto. It was built in the 18th century on the site of a medieval predecessor.
