= Zagorica pri Čatežu =

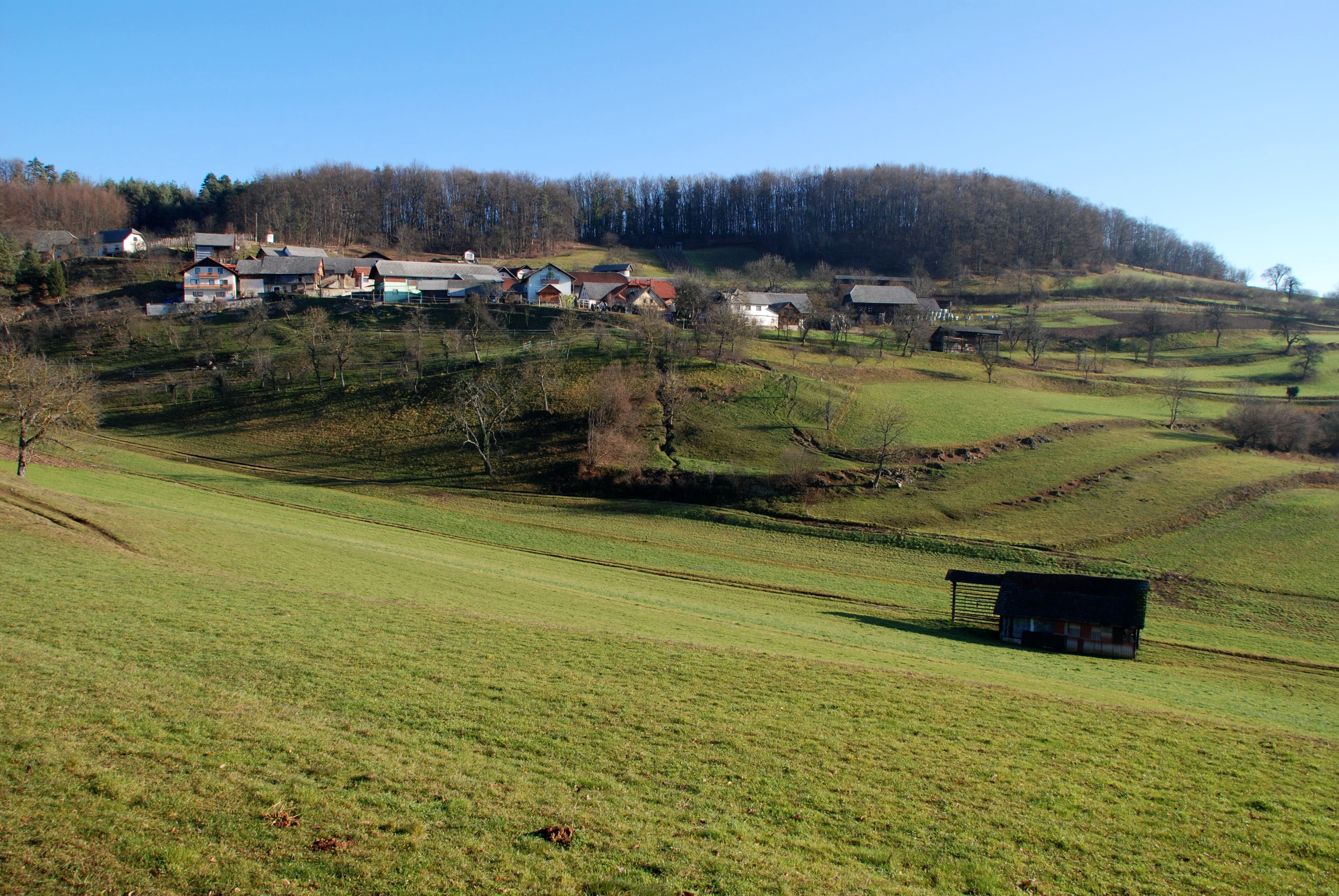

- Location in Slovenia
- Coordinates: 45°57′40.36″N 14°57′46.67″E
- Country: Slovenia
- Traditional region: Lower Carniola
- Statistical region: Southeast Slovenia
- Municipality: Trebnje

Area
  - Total: 0.91 km^{2} (0.35 sq mi)
- Elevation: 421 m (1,381 ft)

Population (2002)
  - Total: 34

Zagorica pri Čatežu (pronounced [zaɡɔˈɾiːtsa pɾi ˈtʃaːtɛʒu]) is a small settlement south of Čatež in the Municipality of Trebnje in eastern Slovenia. The area is part of the historical region of Lower Carniola. The municipality is now included in the Southeast Slovenia Statistical Region.

== Name ==
The name of the settlement was changed from Zagorica to Zagorica pri Čatežu in 1953.
