= Veliki Osolnik =

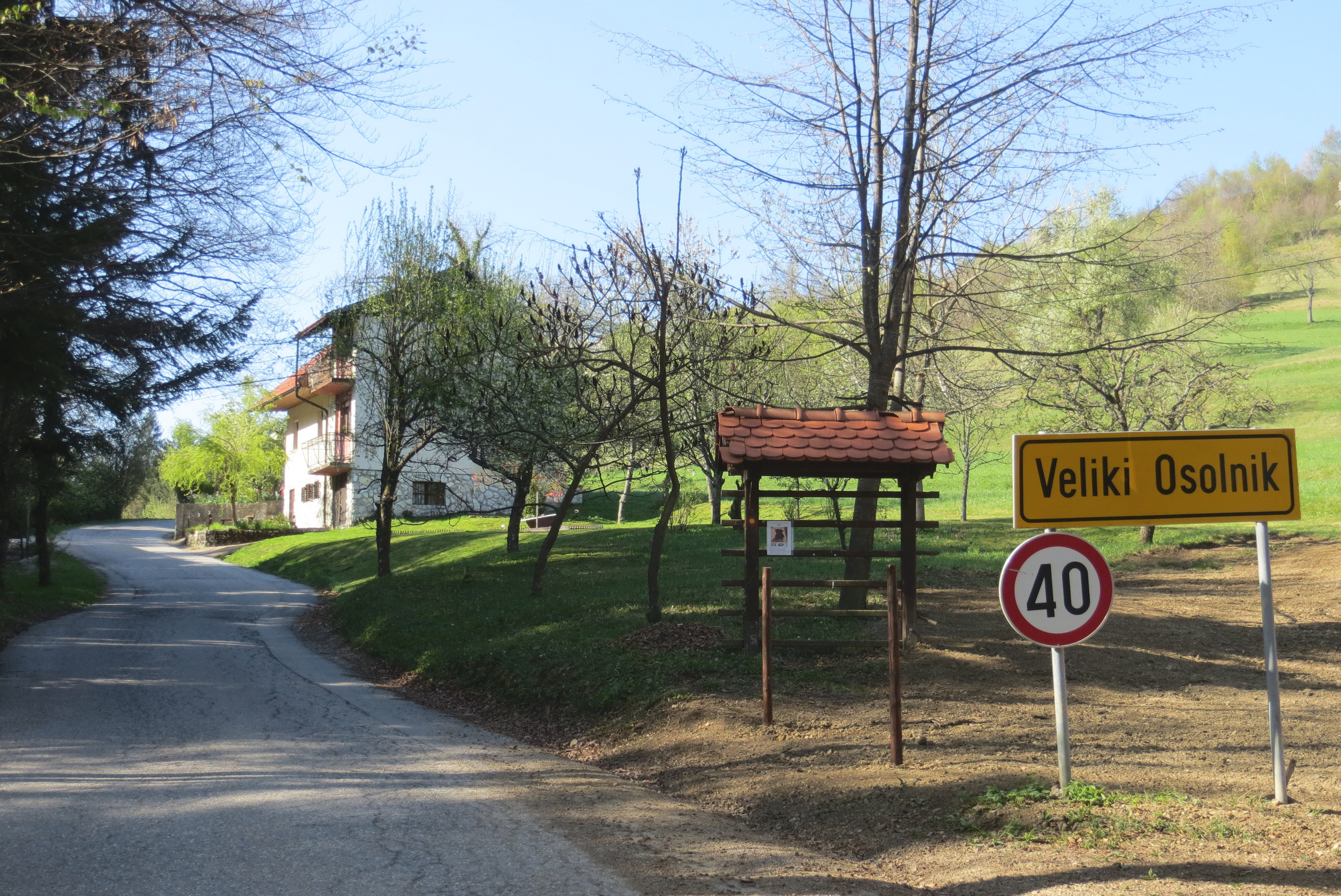

- Location in Slovenia
- Coordinates: 45°51′8.03″N 14°35′12.41″E
- Country: Slovenia
- Traditional region: Lower Carniola
- Statistical region: Central Slovenia
- Municipality: Velike Lašče

Area
  - Total: 1.47 km^{2} (0.57 sq mi)
- Elevation: 678.2 m (2,225 ft)

Population (2002)
  - Total: 78
- Postal code: 1314

Veliki Osolnik (pronounced [ˈʋeːliki ɔˈsoːu̯nik]; German: Großosolnik) is a village west of Rašica in the Municipality of Velike Lašče in central Slovenia. The entire municipality is part of the traditional region of Lower Carniola and is now included in the Central Slovenia Statistical Region.

== Church ==
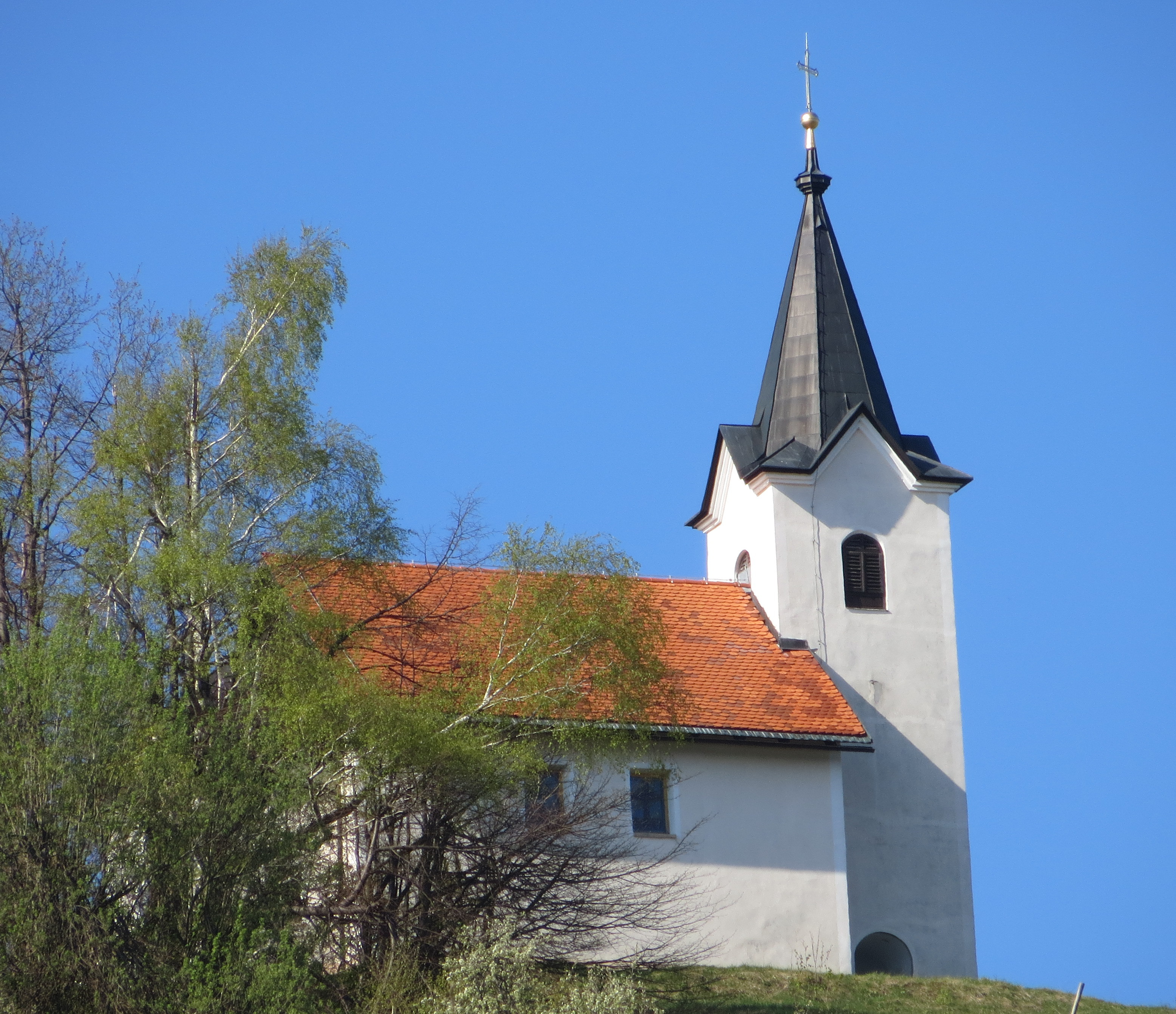
Saint Lawrence's Church

The local church, built on a hill east of the village, is dedicated to Saint Lawrence and belongs to the Parish of Rob. Originally a medieval church, it was thoroughly rebuilt in the 18th century.
