= Prečna =

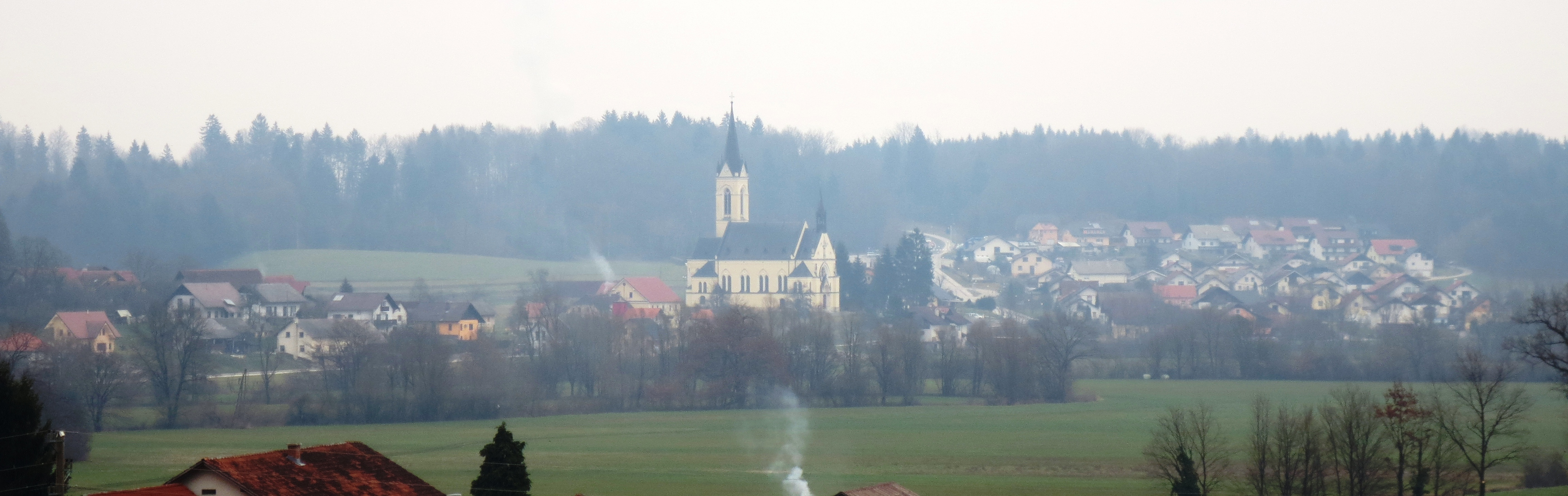

- Location in Slovenia
- Coordinates: 45°48′55.06″N 15°7′10.32″E
- Country: Slovenia
- Traditional region: Lower Carniola
- Statistical region: Southeast Slovenia
- Municipality: Novo Mesto

Area
  - Total: 2.123 km^{2} (0.820 sq mi)
- Elevation: 181.7 m (596 ft)

Population (2026)
  - Total: 409
  - Density: 193/km^{2} (500/sq mi)
- Postal code: 8000

Prečna (pronounced [ˈpɾeːtʃna], German: Pretschna) is a settlement northwest of the town of Novo Mesto in southeastern Slovenia. The area is part of the traditional region of Lower Carniola and is now included in the Southeast Slovenia Statistical Region. In January 2026, the population was 409.

The local parish church is dedicated to Saint Anthony of Padua and belongs to the Roman Catholic Diocese of Novo Mesto. It was built in 1907 in a Neo-Gothic style on the site of an older church dedicated to the Prophet Elijah.
