= Pekel, Trebnje =

Pekel
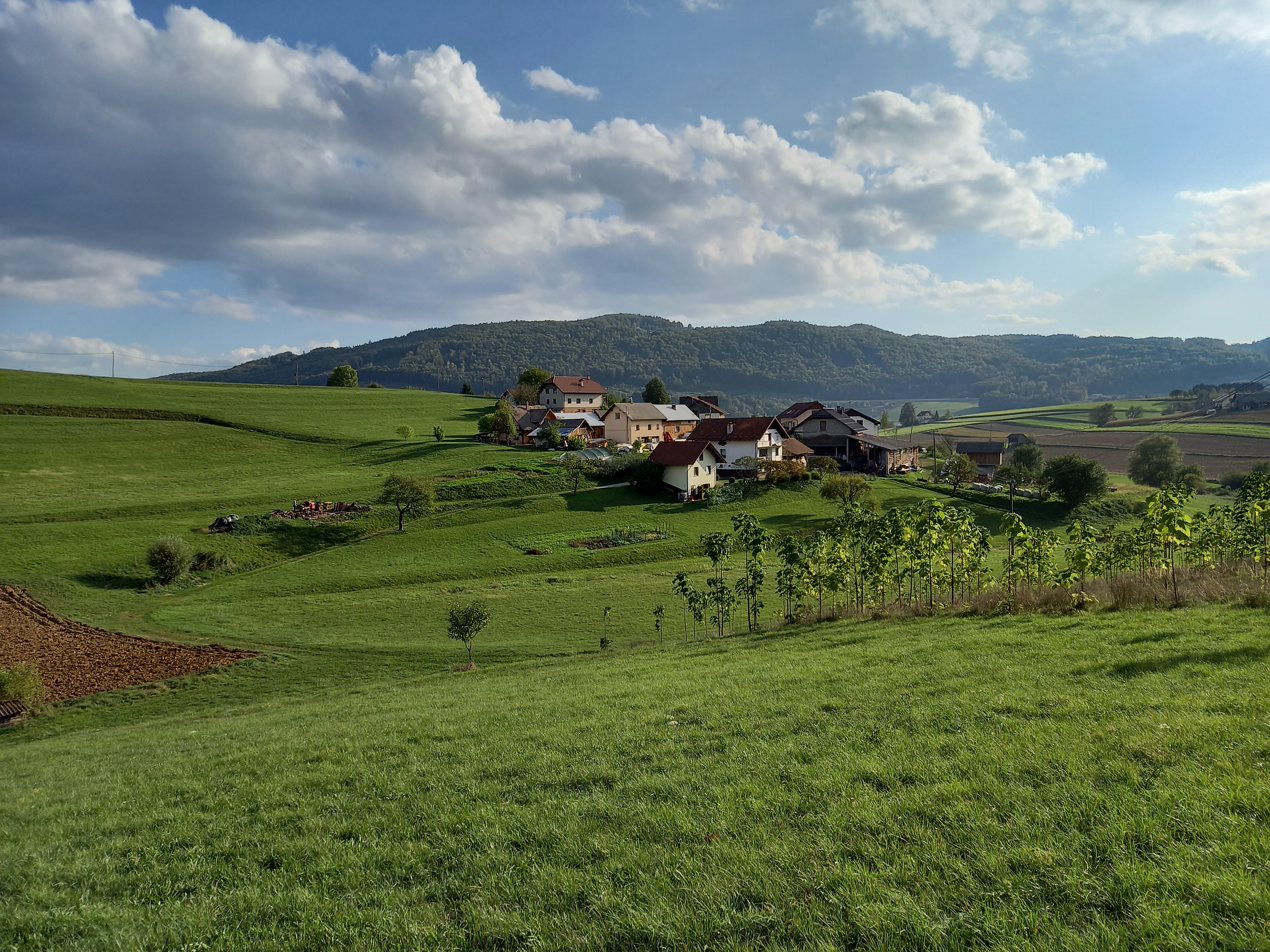

- Location in Slovenia
- Coordinates: 45°54′59.06″N 15°0′12.04″E
- Country: Slovenia
- Traditional region: Lower Carniola
- Statistical region: Southeast Slovenia
- Municipality: Trebnje

Area
  - Total: 0.41 km^{2} (0.16 sq mi)
- Elevation: 289.9 m (951 ft)

Population (2002)
  - Total: 71

Pekel (pronounced [pəˈkəu̯]) is a small settlement in the Municipality of Trebnje in eastern Slovenia. It lies just north of Trebnje itself on the road to Račje Selo. The municipality is included in the Southeast Slovenia Statistical Region. The entire area is part of the historical region of Lower Carniola.

== Name ==
Pekel was attested in written sources in 1436 as Hellentorf. Across Slovenia there are many oronyms, regional names, and microtoponyms named Pekel 'hell'. In folk geography, the name was used to metaphorically designate chasms, caves, shafts, and other narrow, dark places; for example, in Kropa there is the estate name Pekel originally referring to a blacksmith's shop. Semantically related names in Slovenia include Devil's Hole (Slovene: Vragova luknja) in the settlement of Okrog and Devil's Ravine (Slovene: Hudičev graben) in the settlement of Parož. See also Pekel, Maribor, Hell Cave, and Hell Gorge.
