= Pekel =

Pekel may refer to:

== People ==
- Birol Pekel (1938–2004), Turkish football player
- Melike Pekel (born 1995), Turkish-German women's football player

== Settlements ==
- Pako, a settlement in the Municipality of Borovnica, formerly known as Pekel
- Pekel, Maribor, a settlement in the Municipality of Maribor
- Pekel, Trebnje, a settlement in the Municipality of Trebnje

== Other ==
- Hell Cave, known as Jama Pekel in Slovene
- Hell Gorge, known as Soteska Pekel in Slovene
- Pekel A, a river in Groningen
- Pekel Grave, an unmarked Second World War grave
