= Hell Cave =

Cave and archaeological site in Slovenia

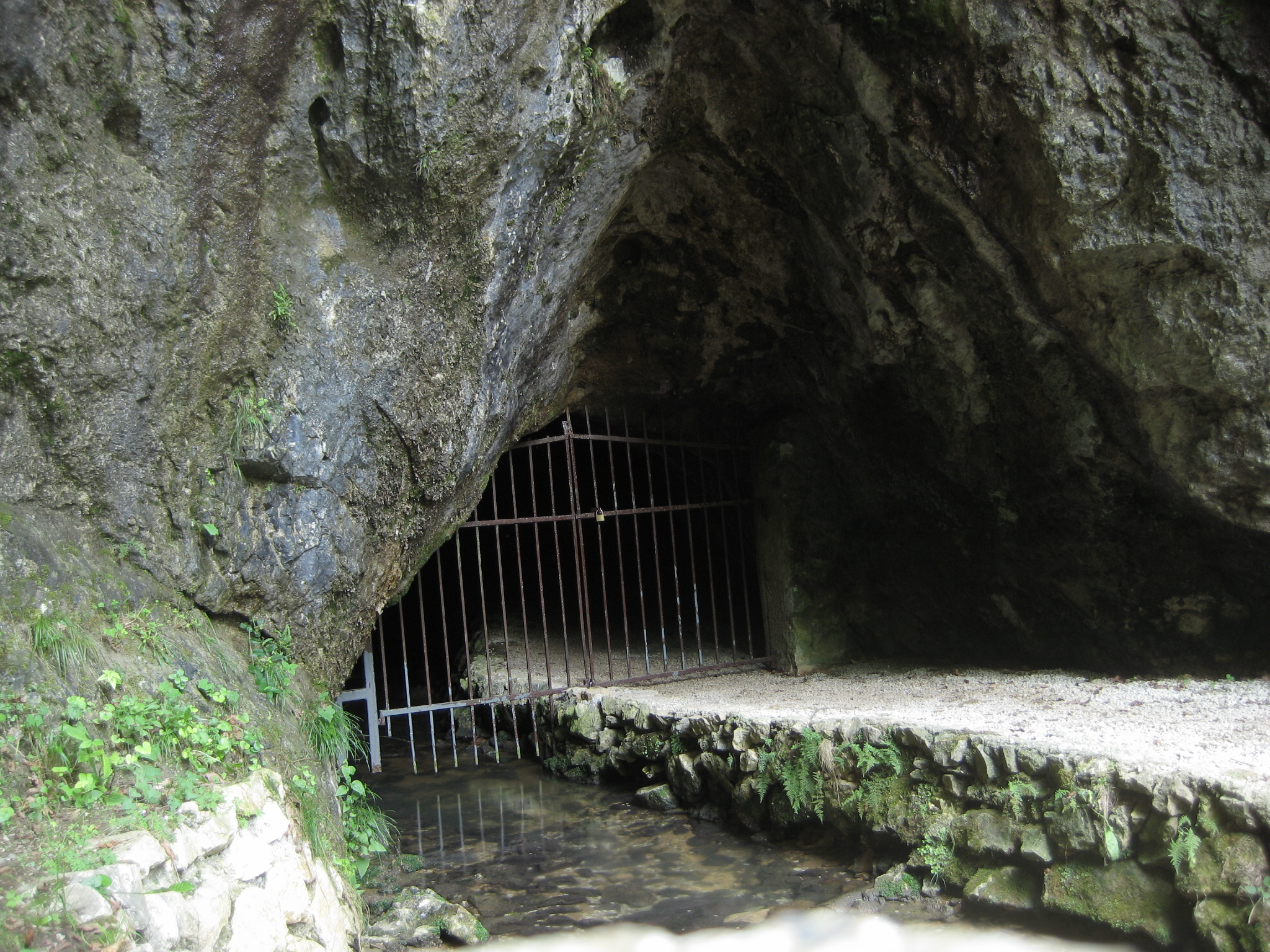
- Entrance to the cave

- Location within Slovenia
- Location: Zalog pri Šempetru, Slovenia
- Coordinates: 46°17′23.28″N 15°7′58.8″E
- Length: 1,159 m
- Discovery: 1860
- Geology: Karst

Hell Cave (Slovene: Jama Pekel) is a karst cave in the settlement of Zalog pri Šempetru in Slovenia.

== Name ==
Across Slovenia there are many oronyms, regional names, and microtoponyms named Pekel or 'hell'. In folk geography, the name was used to metaphorically designate chasms, caves, shafts and other narrow, dark places; for example, in Kropa there is the estate name Pekel originally referring to a blacksmith's shop. Semantically related names in Slovenia include Devil's Hole (Slovene: Vragova luknja) in the settlement of Okrog and Devil's Ravine (Slovene: Hudičev graben) in the settlement of Parož. The cave's dark, black entrance inspired the idea that the Devil lived inside.

Other stories of the name's origin say that one of the rocks near the entrance was thought to look like the Devil or that warm water vapour drifting from the cave in the winter had an eerie effect. See also Hell Gorge, Pekel, Maribor, and Pekel, Trebnje.

== Description ==
The cave is 1,159 m (3,802 ft) long and has two levels. Peklenščica Creek runs through the caverns of the lower part of the cave and comes bursting out of a siphon as the highest-elevation accessible subterranean waterfall in Slovenia. The upper part of the cave is dry, but full of cave formations.

== History ==
The cave is more than three million years old. Finds of human bones in the cave prove that the cave was used as a shelter by these early inhabitants of Europe. Wooden footbridges were set up in the cave in 1860, making it accessible to visitors. The cave became better known between 1860 and 1870, when it was explored by Anton Franz Reibenschuh, a professor from Graz. It was also explored at the end of the 19th century by Ivan Kač, a municipal secretary in Žalec.

The speleologist Anton Suwa died in the cave in 1969. In 1972 the cave was opened to the public and it was visited by 25,000 people the following year. It has been managed by the local tourist association since 1972.
