= Pekel, Maribor =

Pekel
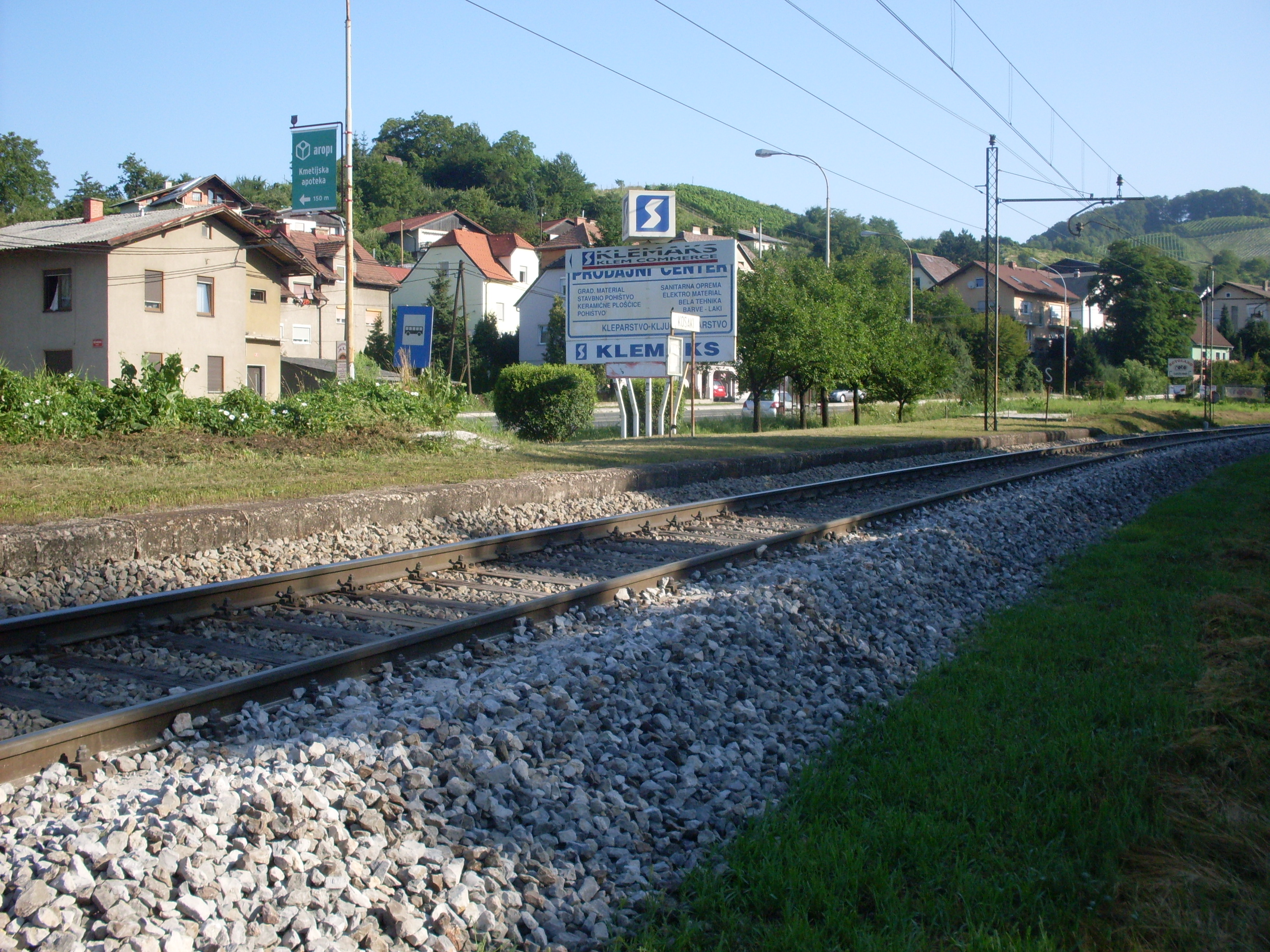
- Railway halt in Pekel

- Location in Slovenia
- Coordinates: 46°35′6.81″N 15°40′41.89″E
- Country: Slovenia
- Traditional region: Styria
- Statistical region: Drava
- Municipality: Maribor

Area
  - Total: 1.98 km^{2} (0.76 sq mi)
- Elevation: 374 m (1,227 ft)

Population (2021)
  - Total: 180

Pekel (pronounced [ˈpɛːkəu̯] or [ˈpɛkəu̯]) is a settlement north of Maribor in northeastern Slovenia. It belongs to the City Municipality of Maribor.

== Name ==
Pekel was attested in written sources circa 1500 as in der Hell. The name is pronounced Pêkel (corresponding to the dialect pronunciation of the common noun pêkel 'Hell') rather than the more standard Pekèl. Across Slovenia there are many oronyms, regional names, and microptoponyms named Pekel. In folk geography, the name was used to metaphorically designate chasms, caves, shafts, and other narrow, dark places; for example, in Kropa there is the estate name Pekel originally referring to a blacksmith's shop. Semantically related names in Slovenia include Devil's Hole (Slovene: Vragova luknja) in the settlement of Okrog and Devil's Ravine (Slovene: Hudičev graben) in the settlement of Parož. See also Pekel, Trebnje, Hell Cave, and Hell Gorge.
