= Strmec =

Strmec may refer to:

Places in Croatia:

- Strmec, Sveta Nedelja, a village near Sveta Nedelja, Zagreb County (also known as Strmec Samoborski from 1910 to 1991)
- Strmec Podravski, a village near Petrijanec, Varaždin County
- Strmec Stubički, a village near Stubičke Toplice, Krapina-Zagorje County
- Strmec, Zagreb, a village part of the Brezovica district, City of Zagreb, Croatia (also known as Odranski Strmec)
- Strmec, Krapina-Zagorje County, a village near Veliko Trgovišće
- Strmec, Preseka, a village near Preseka, Zagreb County
- Strmec Bukevski, a village near Velika Gorica, Zagreb County

Places in Slovenia:

- Nova Cerkev, a settlement in the Municipality of Vojnik (known as Strmec (pri Vojniku) from 1952 to 1992)
- Strmec, Idrija, a settlement in the Municipality of Idrija
- Strmec, Litija, a settlement in the Municipality of Litija
- Strmec, Luče, a settlement in the Municipality of Luče
- Strmec, Velike Lašče, a settlement in the Municipality of Velike Lašče
- Strmec na Predelu, a settlement in the Municipality of Bovec
- Strmec nad Dobrno, a settlement in the Municipality of Dobrna
- Strmec pri Destrniku, a settlement in the Municipality of Destrnik
- Strmec pri Leskovcu, a settlement in the Municipality of Videm
- Strmec pri Ormožu, a settlement in the Municipality of Ormož
- Strmec pri Polenšaku, a settlement in the Municipality of Dornava
- Strmec pri Svetem Florijanu, a settlement in the Municipality of Rogaška Slatina
