= Lokovina =

- Location in Slovenia
- Coordinates: 46°20′10.05″N 15°12′38.51″E
- Country: Slovenia
- Traditional region: Styria
- Statistical region: Savinja
- Municipality: Dobrna

Area
  - Total: 2.31 km^{2} (0.89 sq mi)
- Elevation: 433.7 m (1,423 ft)

Population (2020)
  - Total: 329
  - Density: 142/km^{2} (369/sq mi)

Lokovina (pronounced [ˈloːkɔʋina]) is a settlement west of Dobrna in Slovenia. The Municipality of Dobrna is part of the traditional region of Styria. It is now included in the Savinja Statistical Region.
