= Brezovci =

Brezovci is a Slovene place name that may refer to:

- Brezovci, Dornava, a village in the Municipality of Dornava, northeastern Slovenia
- Brezovci, Puconci, a village in the Municipality of Puconci, northeastern Slovenia
- Brezovci, Hrib, a hamlet in the Municipality of Čabar, Croatia
