= Goljek =

- Location in Slovenia
- Coordinates: 45°57′31.95″N 14°59′29.32″E
- Country: Slovenia
- Traditional region: Lower Carniola
- Statistical region: Southeast Slovenia
- Municipality: Trebnje

Area
  - Total: 0.99 km^{2} (0.38 sq mi)
- Elevation: 425.9 m (1,397 ft)

Population (2002)
  - Total: 62

Goljek (pronounced [ˈɡoːljɛk]) is a small settlement in the Municipality of Trebnje in eastern Slovenia. It lies on the road between Čatež and Račje Selo in the hills north of Trebnje. The area is part of the historical region of Lower Carniola. The municipality is now included in the Southeast Slovenia Statistical Region.

In Goljek there is a small Buddhist forest hermitage called Samaṇadīpa.
