= Loka pri Dobrni =

- Location in Slovenia
- Coordinates: 46°21′3.52″N 15°12′20.01″E
- Country: Slovenia
- Traditional region: Styria
- Statistical region: Savinja
- Municipality: Dobrna

Area
  - Total: 0.63 km^{2} (0.24 sq mi)
- Elevation: 601.7 m (1,974 ft)

Population (2020)
  - Total: 36
  - Density: 57/km^{2} (150/sq mi)

Loka pri Dobrni (pronounced [ˈloːka pɾi ˈdoːbəɾni]) is a small dispersed settlement in the hills northwest of Dobrna in Slovenia. The area is part of the traditional region of Styria. The Municipality of Dobrna is now included in the Savinja Statistical Region.

== Name ==
The name of the settlement was changed from Loka to Loka pri Dobrni in 1953.
