= Cviblje =

- Location in Slovenia
- Coordinates: 45°54′43″N 15°00′30″E
- Country: Slovenia
- Traditional region: Lower Carniola
- Statistical region: Southeast Slovenia
- Municipality: Trebnje
- Elevation: 300 m (980 ft)

Cviblje (pronounced [ˈtsʋiːbljɛ], in older sources also Cvible or Cvibel, German: Zwible or Zwibu) is a former village in eastern Slovenia in the Municipality of Trebnje. It is now part of the town of Trebnje. It is part of the traditional region of Lower Carniola and is now included in the Southeast Slovenia Statistical Region.

== Geography ==
Cviblje is a scattered settlement northwest of the center of Trebnje along both sides of the road from Trebnje to Račje Selo. It included the hamlet of Paradiž to the west, now also part of Trebnje. The terrain is hilly; there are tilled fields on the slopes in sunny locations and mixed woods to the north. Damp meadows lies below the village along the tributaries of the Temenica River.

== Name ==
It is hypothesized that the name Cviblje is derived from the common noun cviba, a dialect form of sviba 'dogwood', referring to the local vegetation.

== History ==
Iron ore was formerly mined in the Reber area northwest of the village and transported to the Auersperg iron foundry in Dvor. Cviblje was annexed by Trebnje in 1972, ending its existence as a separate settlement.
