= Slomi =

- Location in Slovenia
- Coordinates: 46°27′5.56″N 15°59′44″E
- Country: Slovenia
- Traditional region: Styria
- Statistical region: Drava
- Municipality: Dornava

Area
  - Total: 3.12 km^{2} (1.20 sq mi)
- Elevation: 255.8 m (839 ft)

Population (2020)
  - Total: 92
  - Density: 29/km^{2} (76/sq mi)

Slomi (pronounced [ˈsloːmi], German: Slomdorf) is a settlement in the Municipality of Dornava in northeastern Slovenia. It lies on the southeastern edge of the Slovene Hills (Slovene: Slovenske gorice), just north of Dornava on the road to Polenšak. The area is part of the traditional region of Styria. It is now included with the rest of the municipality in the Drava Statistical Region.
