= Pristova =

- Location in Slovenia
- Coordinates: 46°19′35.32″N 15°13′16.72″E
- Country: Slovenia
- Traditional region: Styria
- Statistical region: Savinja
- Municipality: Dobrna

Area
  - Total: 2.48 km^{2} (0.96 sq mi)
- Elevation: 348.8 m (1,144 ft)

Population (2020)
  - Total: 109
  - Density: 44.0/km^{2} (114/sq mi)

Pristova (pronounced [ˈpɾiːstɔʋa]) is a village in the Municipality of Dobrna in Slovenia. It lies on the right bank of Dobrnica Creek, south of Dobrna, extending south into the Hudinja Hills (Slovene: Hudinjsko gričevje). The area is part of the traditional region of Styria. The municipality is now included in the Savinja Statistical Region.
