= Vrba, Dobrna =

Vrba
- Location in Slovenia
- Coordinates: 46°20′20.85″N 15°14′23.31″E
- Country: Slovenia
- Traditional region: Styria
- Statistical region: Savinja
- Municipality: Dobrna

Area
  - Total: 1.27 km^{2} (0.49 sq mi)
- Elevation: 423.9 m (1,391 ft)

Population (2020)
  - Total: 127
  - Density: 100/km^{2} (259/sq mi)

Vrba (pronounced [ˈʋəɾba]) is a settlement in the Municipality of Dobrna in Slovenia. The area is part of the traditional region of Styria. The municipality is now included in the Savinja Statistical Region.

The local church is dedicated to Saint Nicholas (Slovene: sveti Miklavž) and belongs to the Parish of Dobrna. It dates to the late 14th century with 17th- and 18th-century adaptations.
