= Mezgovci ob Pesnici =

- Location in Slovenia
- Coordinates: 46°25′49.09″N 15°57′54.4″E
- Country: Slovenia
- Traditional region: Styria
- Statistical region: Drava
- Municipality: Dornava

Area
  - Total: 2.85 km^{2} (1.10 sq mi)
- Elevation: 216.3 m (710 ft)

Population (2020)
  - Total: 468
  - Density: 164/km^{2} (425/sq mi)

Mezgovci ob Pesnici (pronounced [ˈmeːzɡɔu̯tsi ɔp ˈpeːsnitsi]) is a village on the right bank of the Pesnica River in the Municipality of Dornava in northeastern Slovenia. The area is part of the traditional region of Styria. It is now included with the rest of the municipality in the Drava Statistical Region.

== Name ==
The name of the settlement was changed from Mezgovci to Mezgovci ob Pesnici in 1955.

== Cultural heritage ==
A small chapel-shrine with a belfry was built south of the settlement in the second half of the 19th century.
