= Lasigovci =

- Location in Slovenia
- Coordinates: 46°27′10.88″N 16°1′17.83″E
- Country: Slovenia
- Traditional region: Styria
- Statistical region: Drava
- Municipality: Dornava

Area
  - Total: 2 km^{2} (0.77 sq mi)
- Elevation: 228 m (748 ft)

Population (2020)
  - Total: 119
  - Density: 60/km^{2} (150/sq mi)

Lasigovci (pronounced [ˈlaːsiɡɔu̯tsi]) is a settlement in the Slovene Hills (Slovene: Slovenske gorice) in the Municipality of Dornava in northeastern Slovenia. The area is part of the traditional region of Styria and is now included with the rest of the municipality in the Drava Statistical Region.
