= Klanc =

- Location in Slovenia
- Coordinates: 46°20′48.5″N 15°13′44.66″E
- Country: Slovenia
- Traditional region: Styria
- Statistical region: Savinja
- Municipality: Dobrna

Area
  - Total: 2.59 km^{2} (1.00 sq mi)
- Elevation: 455.5 m (1,494 ft)

Population (2020)
  - Total: 460
  - Density: 180/km^{2} (460/sq mi)

Klanc (pronounced [ˈklaːnts]) is a settlement in the Municipality of Dobrna in Slovenia. It lies in the hills just north of Dobrna. The area is part of the traditional region of Styria and is now included in the Savinja Statistical Region.
