= Strmec pri Polenšaku =

- Location in Slovenia
- Coordinates: 46°26′15.24″N 15°59′57.61″E
- Country: Slovenia
- Traditional region: Styria
- Statistical region: Drava
- Municipality: Dornava

Area
  - Total: 0.49 km^{2} (0.19 sq mi)
- Elevation: 270.3 m (887 ft)

Population (2020)
  - Total: 63
  - Density: 130/km^{2} (330/sq mi)

Strmec pri Polenšaku (pronounced [ˈstəɾməts pɾi ˈpoːlɛnʃaku]) is a small settlement in the Municipality of Dornava in northeastern Slovenia. It lies at the edge of the Slovene Hills (Slovene: Slovenske gorice) east of Dornava and south of Polenšak. The area is part of the traditional region of Styria. It is now included with the rest of the municipality in the Drava Statistical Region.

== Name ==
The name of the settlement was changed from Strmec to Strmec pri Polenšaku in 1953.
