= Strejaci =

- Location in Slovenia
- Coordinates: 46°26′14.63″N 15°59′15.9″E
- Country: Slovenia
- Traditional region: Styria
- Statistical region: Drava
- Municipality: Dornava

Area
  - Total: 1.18 km^{2} (0.46 sq mi)
- Elevation: 216.3 m (710 ft)

Population (2020)
  - Total: 60
  - Density: 51/km^{2} (130/sq mi)

Strejaci (pronounced [ˈstɾeːjatsi]) is a small settlement in the Municipality of Dornava in northeastern Slovenia. It lies in the foothills of the Slovene Hills (Slovene: Slovenske gorice) on the left bank of the Pesnica River. The area is part of the traditional region of Styria. It is now included with the rest of the municipality in the Drava Statistical Region.
