= Polenci =

- Location in Slovenia
- Coordinates: 46°27′36.75″N 16°0′46.44″E
- Country: Slovenia
- Traditional region: Styria
- Statistical region: Drava
- Municipality: Dornava

Area
  - Total: 2.69 km^{2} (1.04 sq mi)
- Elevation: 235 m (771 ft)

Population (2020)
  - Total: 194
  - Density: 72.1/km^{2} (187/sq mi)

Polenci (pronounced [ˈpoːlɛntsi]) is a small settlement in the Municipality of Dornava in northeastern Slovenia. It lies in the Slovene Hills (Slovene: Slovenske gorice). The area is part of the traditional region of Styria. It is now included with the rest of the municipality in the Drava Statistical Region.
