= Municipality of Dobrna =

Municipality of Slovenia

Municipality of Dobrna Občina Dobrna
- Municipality
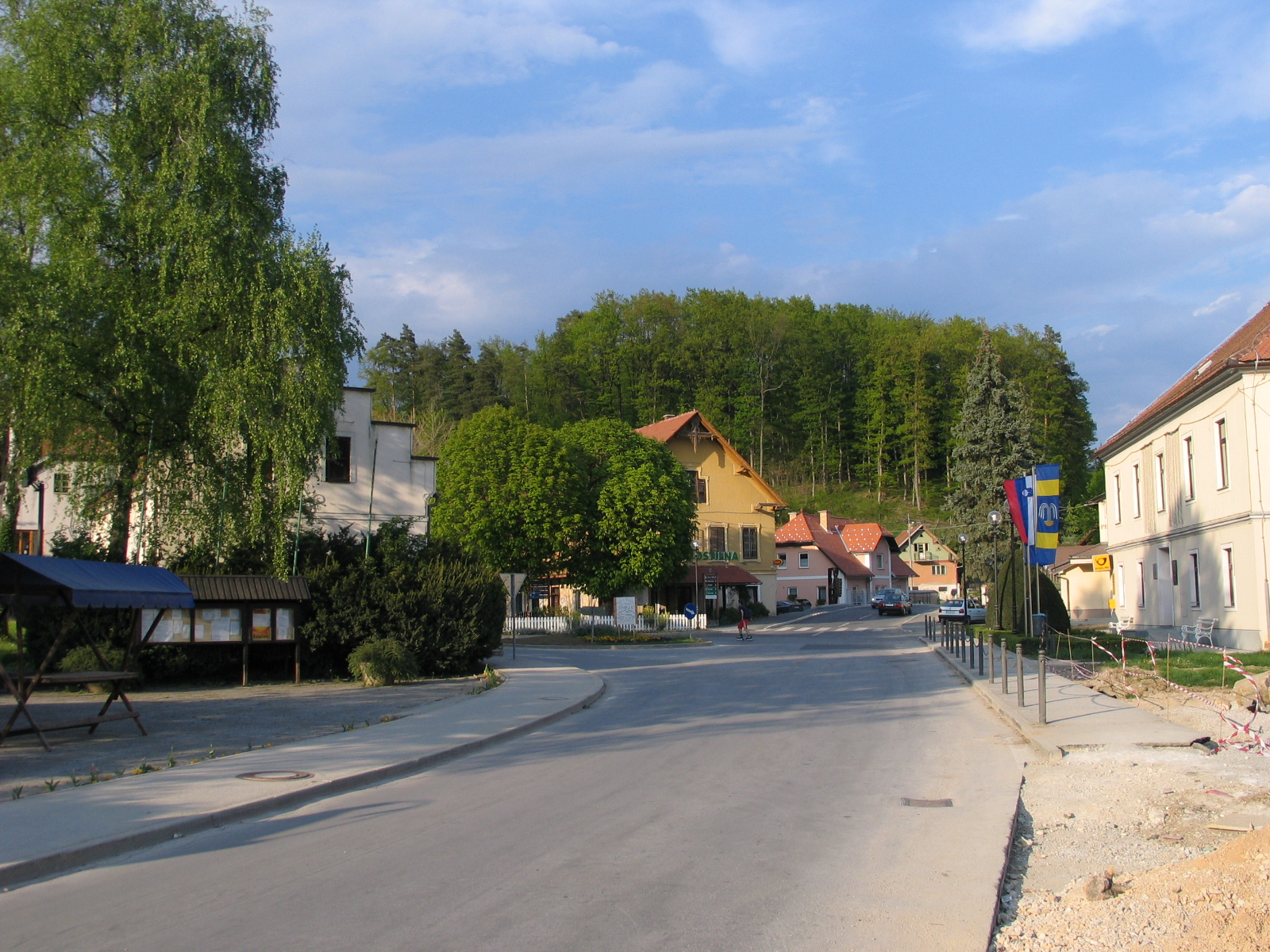

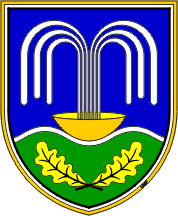
- Coat of arms

- Location of the Municipality of Dobrna in Slovenia
- Coordinates: 46°20′N 15°14′E
- Country: Slovenia

Government
  - Mayor: Martin Brecl (Independent)

Area
  - Total: 31.7 km^{2} (12.2 sq mi)

Population (2002)
  - Total: 2,083
  - Density: 65.7/km^{2} (170/sq mi)
- Time zone: UTC+01 (CET)
  - Summer (DST): UTC+02 (CEST)
- Website: www.dobrna.si

The Municipality of Dobrna (pronounced [ˈdoːbəɾna]; Slovene: Občina Dobrna) is a municipality in Slovenia. It is best known for the spa town of Dobrna, which is also the seat of the municipality. It lies north of Celje and east of Velenje in an area that is part of the traditional region of Styria. The municipality is now included in the Savinja Statistical Region.

== Settlements ==
In addition to the municipal seat of Dobrna, the municipality also includes the following settlements:

- Brdce nad Dobrno
- Klanc
- Loka pri Dobrni
- Lokovina
- Parož
- Pristova
- Strmec nad Dobrno
- Vinska Gorica
- Vrba
- Zavrh nad Dobrno
