= Brdce nad Dobrno =

- Location in Slovenia
- Coordinates: 46°22′8.65″N 15°14′52.79″E
- Country: Slovenia
- Traditional region: Styria
- Statistical region: Savinja
- Municipality: Dobrna

Area
  - Total: 6.43 km^{2} (2.48 sq mi)
- Elevation: 846.5 m (2,777 ft)

Population (2020)
  - Total: 67
  - Density: 10/km^{2} (27/sq mi)

Brdce nad Dobrno (pronounced [ˈbəɾtsɛ nad ˈdoːbəɾnɔ]) is a dispersed settlement in the Municipality of Dobrna in Slovenia. The area is part of the traditional region of Styria. The municipality is now included in the Savinja Statistical Region.

== Name ==
The name of the settlement was changed from Brdce to Brdce nad Dobrno in 1953.

== Cultural heritage ==
A monument to 39 Partisans who were killed in the area in February 1944 was unveiled in 1952.
