= Zavrh nad Dobrno =

- Location in Slovenia
- Coordinates: 46°20′49.02″N 15°14′27.64″E
- Country: Slovenia
- Traditional region: Styria
- Statistical region: Savinja
- Municipality: Dobrna

Area
  - Total: 1.31 km^{2} (0.51 sq mi)
- Elevation: 476.1 m (1,562 ft)

Population (2020)
  - Total: 224
  - Density: 171/km^{2} (443/sq mi)

Zavrh nad Dobrno (pronounced [ˈzaːʋəɾx nad ˈdoːbəɾnɔ]) is a small settlement in the Municipality of Dobrna in Slovenia. It lies in the hills above the left bank of the upper course of Dobrnica Creek, northeast of Dobrna. The area is part of the traditional region of Styria. The municipality is now included in the Savinja Statistical Region.

== Name ==
The name of the settlement was changed from Zavrh to Zavrh nad Dobrno in 1953.
