= Municipality of Dornava =

Municipality of Slovenia

Municipality of Dornava Občina Dornava
- Municipality
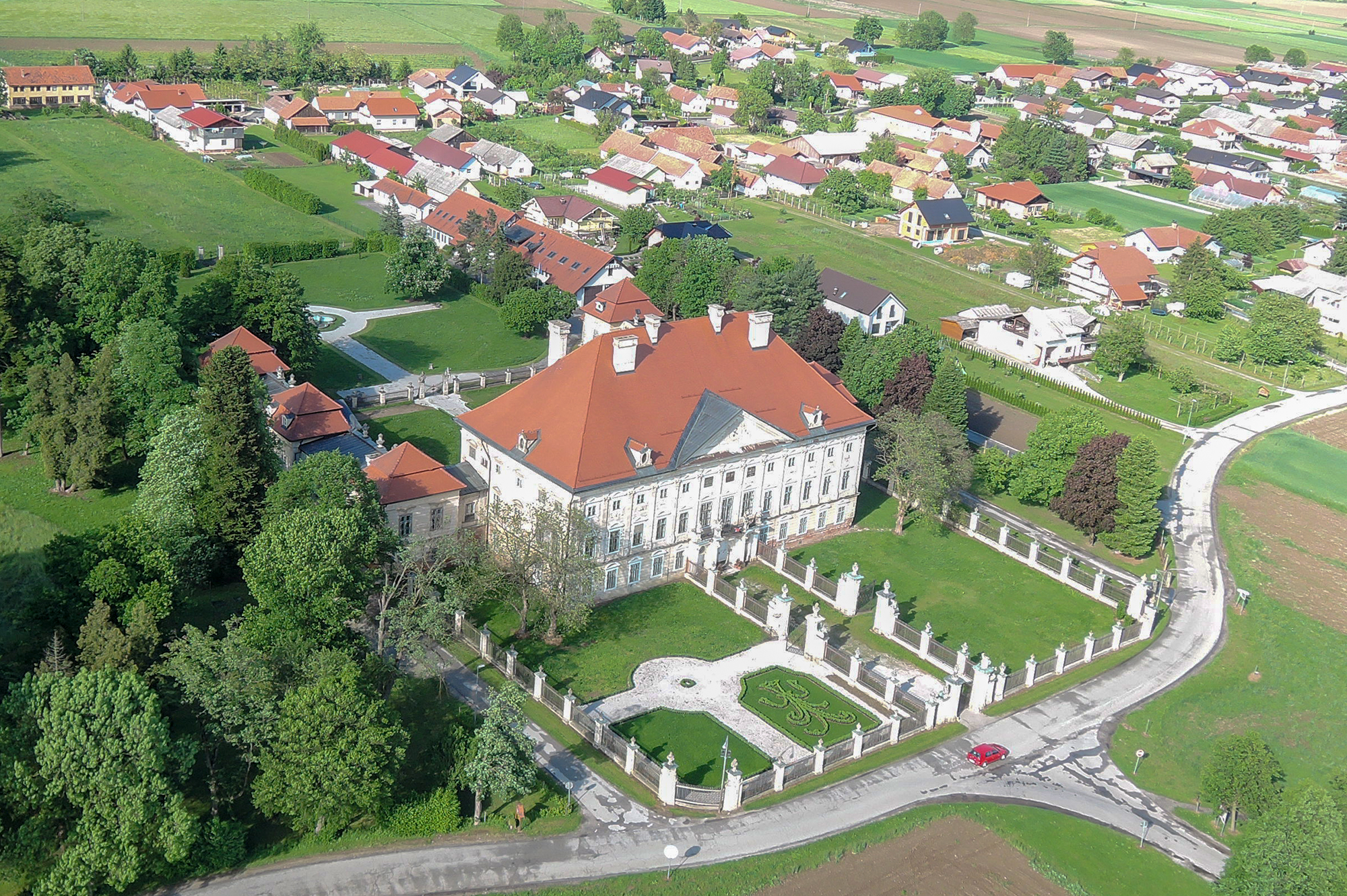

- Location of the Municipality of Dornava in Slovenia
- Coordinates: 46°26′N 15°57′E
- Country: Slovenia

Government
  - Mayor: Rajko Janžekovič (Independent)

Area
  - Total: 28.4 km^{2} (11.0 sq mi)

Population (2002)
  - Total: 2,459
  - Density: 86.6/km^{2} (224/sq mi)
- Time zone: UTC+01 (CET)
  - Summer (DST): UTC+02 (CEST)
- Website: www.dornava.si

The Municipality of Dornava (pronounced [ˈdoːɾnaʋa]; Slovene: Občina Dornava) is a small municipality in northeastern Slovenia. It lies east of Ptuj, partly on the Pesnica River and partly in the Slovene Hills (Slovene: Slovenske gorice). The seat of the municipality is the settlement of Dornava. The area is part of the traditional region of Styria. The municipality is now included in the Drava Statistical Region.

== Settlements ==
In addition to the municipal seat of Dornava, the municipality also includes the following settlements:

- Bratislavci
- Brezovci
- Lasigovci
- Mezgovci ob Pesnici
- Polenci
- Polenšak
- Prerad
- Slomi
- Strejaci
- Strmec pri Polenšaku
- Žamenci

== Gallery ==
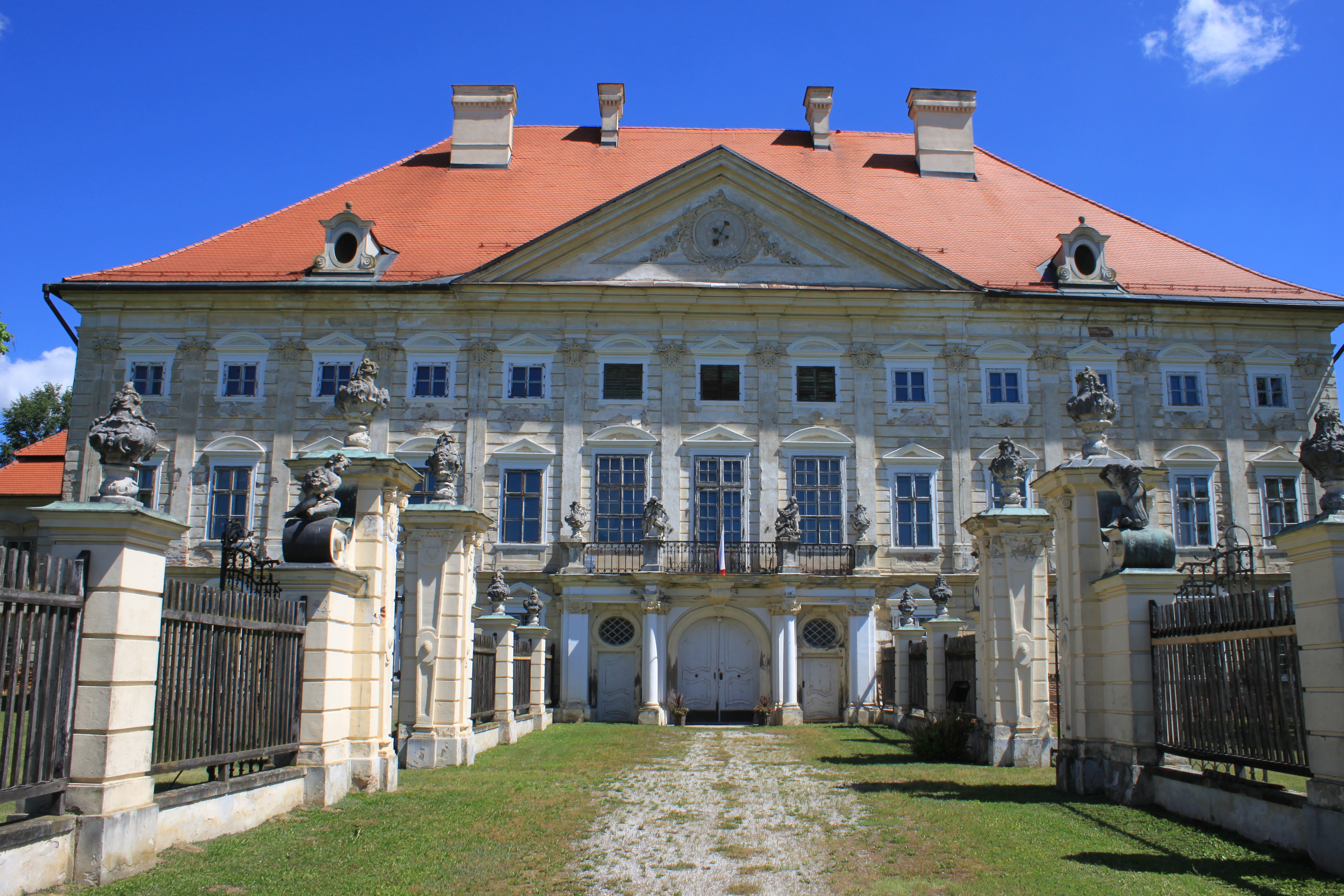
Dornava Mansion, built in 1753
