= Vinska Gorica =

Vinska Gorica Gorica (until 1953)
- Location in Slovenia
- Coordinates: 46°19′40.78″N 15°13′37.78″E
- Country: Slovenia
- Traditional region: Styria
- Statistical region: Savinja
- Municipality: Dobrna

Area
  - Total: 1.51 km^{2} (0.58 sq mi)
- Elevation: 360.4 m (1,182 ft)

Population (2020)
  - Total: 165
  - Density: 109/km^{2} (283/sq mi)

Vinska Gorica (pronounced [ˈʋiːnska ɡɔˈɾiːtsa]) is a settlement in the Municipality of Dobrna in Slovenia. It lies on a small hill just southeast of Dobrna. The area is part of the traditional region of Styria. The municipality is now included in the Savinja Statistical Region.

== Name ==
The name of the settlement was changed from Gorica to Vinska Gorica in 1953.
