= Zalog pri Šempetru =

- Location in Slovenia
- Coordinates: 46°16′39.3″N 15°7′50.88″E
- Country: Slovenia
- Traditional region: Styria
- Statistical region: Savinja
- Municipality: Žalec

Area
  - Total: 2.45 km^{2} (0.95 sq mi)
- Elevation: 274.4 m (900 ft)

Population (2002)
  - Total: 95

Zalog pri Šempetru (pronounced [zaˈloːk pɾi ʃɛmˈpeːtɾu] or [zaˈloːk pɾi ʃəmˈpeːtɾu]) is a settlement in the Municipality of Žalec in east-central Slovenia. It lies in the hills above the left bank of the Ložnica River, a left tributary of the Savinja north of Šempeter v Savinjski Dolini. The area is part of the traditional region of Styria. The municipality is now included in the Savinja Statistical Region.

== Name ==
The name of the settlement was changed from Zalog to Zalog pri Šempetru in 1953.
