= Brezovci, Dornava =

Brezovci
- Location in Slovenia
- Coordinates: 46°27′3.37″N 16°0′12.55″E
- Country: Slovenia
- Traditional region: Styria
- Statistical region: Drava
- Municipality: Dornava

Area
  - Total: 1.61 km^{2} (0.62 sq mi)
- Elevation: 233.2 m (765 ft)

Population (2020)
  - Total: 90
  - Density: 56/km^{2} (140/sq mi)

Brezovci (pronounced [ˈbɾeːzɔu̯tsi]) is a settlement in the Municipality of Dornava in northeastern Slovenia. It lies on the edge of the Slovene Hills (Slovene: Slovenske gorice), east of Dornava. The area is part of the traditional region of Styria. It is now included with the rest of the municipality in the Drava Statistical Region.
