= Strmec nad Dobrno =

- Location in Slovenia
- Coordinates: 46°22′11.23″N 15°12′15.12″E
- Country: Slovenia
- Traditional region: Styria
- Statistical region: Savinja
- Municipality: Dobrna

Area
  - Total: 8.61 km^{2} (3.32 sq mi)
- Elevation: 636.7 m (2,089 ft)

Population (2020)
  - Total: 127
  - Density: 14.8/km^{2} (38.2/sq mi)

Strmec nad Dobrno (pronounced [ˈstəɾməts nad ˈdoːbəɾnɔ]) is a dispersed settlement in the Municipality of Dobrna in Slovenia. It lies on Paka Mount Kozjak north of Dobrna. The area is part of the traditional region of Styria. The municipality is now included in the Savinja Statistical Region.

The parish church in the settlement is dedicated to Saint Jodocus (Slovene: sveti Jošt) and belongs to the Roman Catholic Diocese of Celje. It was built between 1882 and 1884 on the site of a Gothic predecessor.
