= Polenšak =

- Location in Slovenia
- Coordinates: 46°28′7.53″N 16°0′8.57″E
- Country: Slovenia
- Traditional region: Styria
- Statistical region: Drava
- Municipality: Dornava

Area
  - Total: 1.6 km^{2} (0.62 sq mi)
- Elevation: 283.8 m (931 ft)

Population (2020)
  - Total: 169
  - Density: 110/km^{2} (270/sq mi)

Polenšak (pronounced [ˈpoːlɛnʃak], German: Polenschak) is a village in the Slovene Hills (Slovene: Slovenske gorice) in the Municipality of Dornava in northeastern Slovenia. The area is part of the traditional region of Styria. It is now included with the rest of the municipality in the Drava Statistical Region.

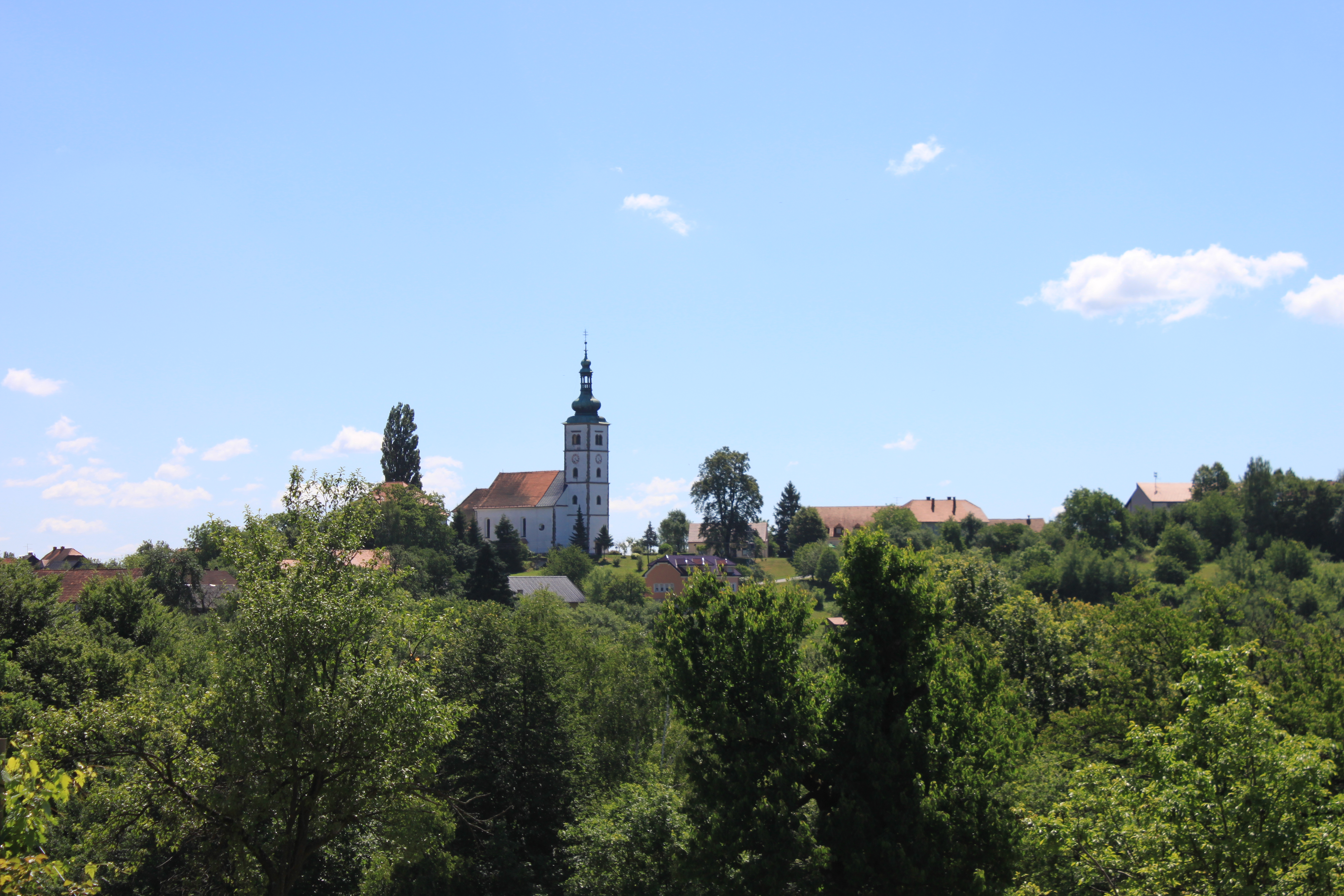
Visitation Church

The parish church in the settlement is dedicated to the Visitation of the Virgin and belongs to the Roman Catholic Archdiocese of Maribor. It was built in the early 17th century.
