= Dobrna =

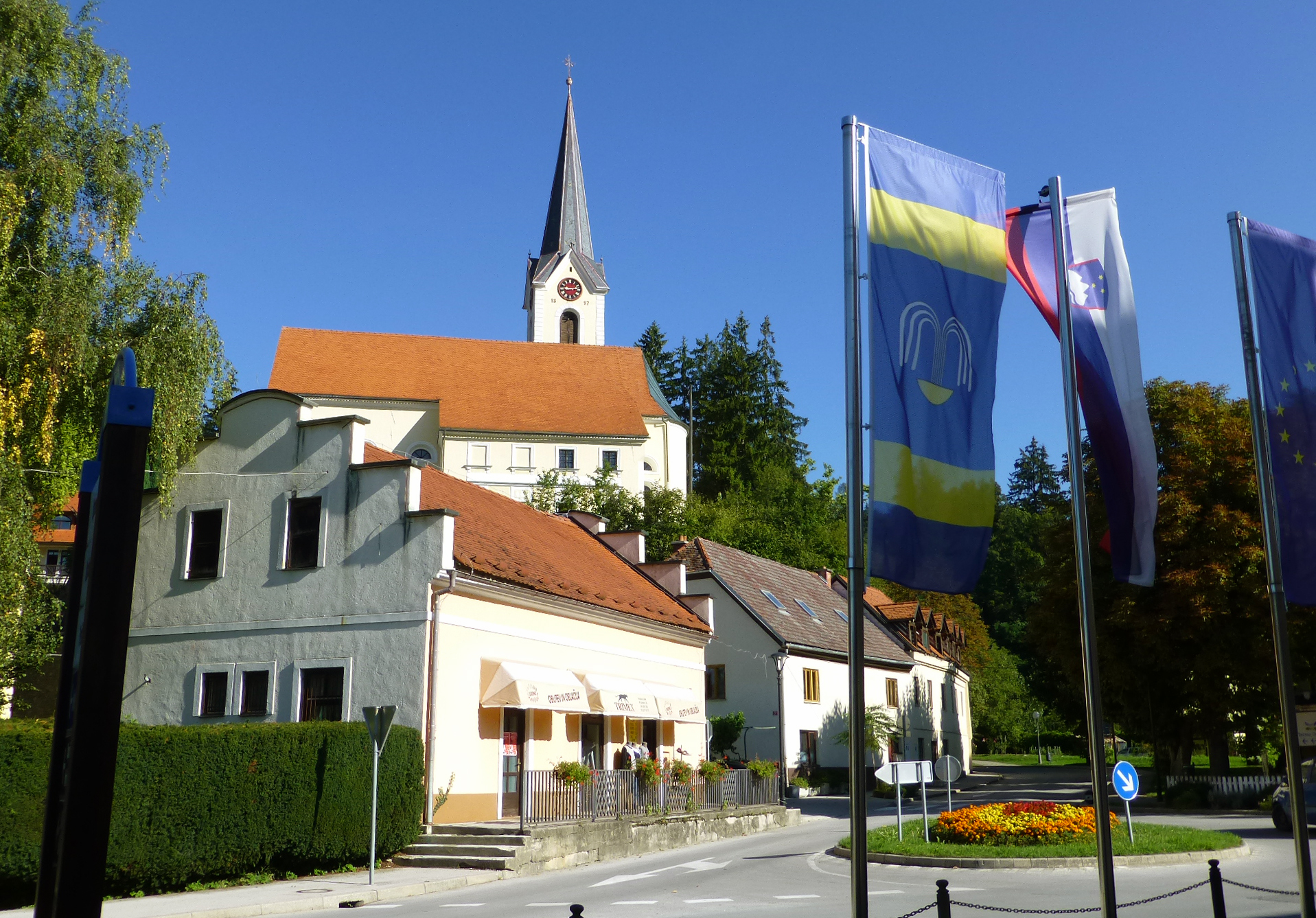
- Main square and church

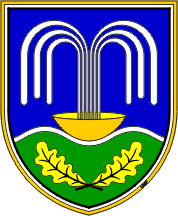
- Coat of arms

- Location in Slovenia
- Coordinates: 46°20′17.04″N 15°13′45.41″E
- Country: Slovenia
- Traditional region: Styria
- Statistical region: Savinja
- Municipality: Dobrna

Area
  - Total: 1.8 km^{2} (0.69 sq mi)
- Elevation: 378.8 m (1,243 ft)

Population (2020)
  - Total: 536
  - Density: 300/km^{2} (770/sq mi)
- Postal code: 3204 Dobrna

Dobrna (pronounced [ˈdoːbəɾna], German: Neuhaus) is a settlement in Slovenia. It is the seat of the Municipality of Dobrna. It is best known for its spa. It lies north of Celje and east of Velenje in an area that is part of the traditional region of Styria. The municipality is now included in the Savinja Statistical Region.

== Name ==
The name Dobrna is probably derived from the Slavic nickname *Dobrъ, referring to an early inhabitant of the place, therefore originally meaning 'Dobrъ's village'. Another possibility is derivation from the common noun *dǫbrъ 'deciduous or oak forest', in turn derived from *dǫbъ 'deciduous tree, oak', referring to the local vegetation.

== Church ==
The parish church in the settlement is dedicated to the Assumption of Mary (Slovene: Marijino vnebovzetje) and belongs to the Roman Catholic Diocese of Celje. It dates to the 16th century with 17th-, 18th-, and 19th-century phases of rebuilding.

== Spa ==
Dobrna is also the site of Terme Dobrna, a spa tracing its history back to 1612. In 1810 and 1811 it was visited by Louis Bonaparte.
