= Kropa =

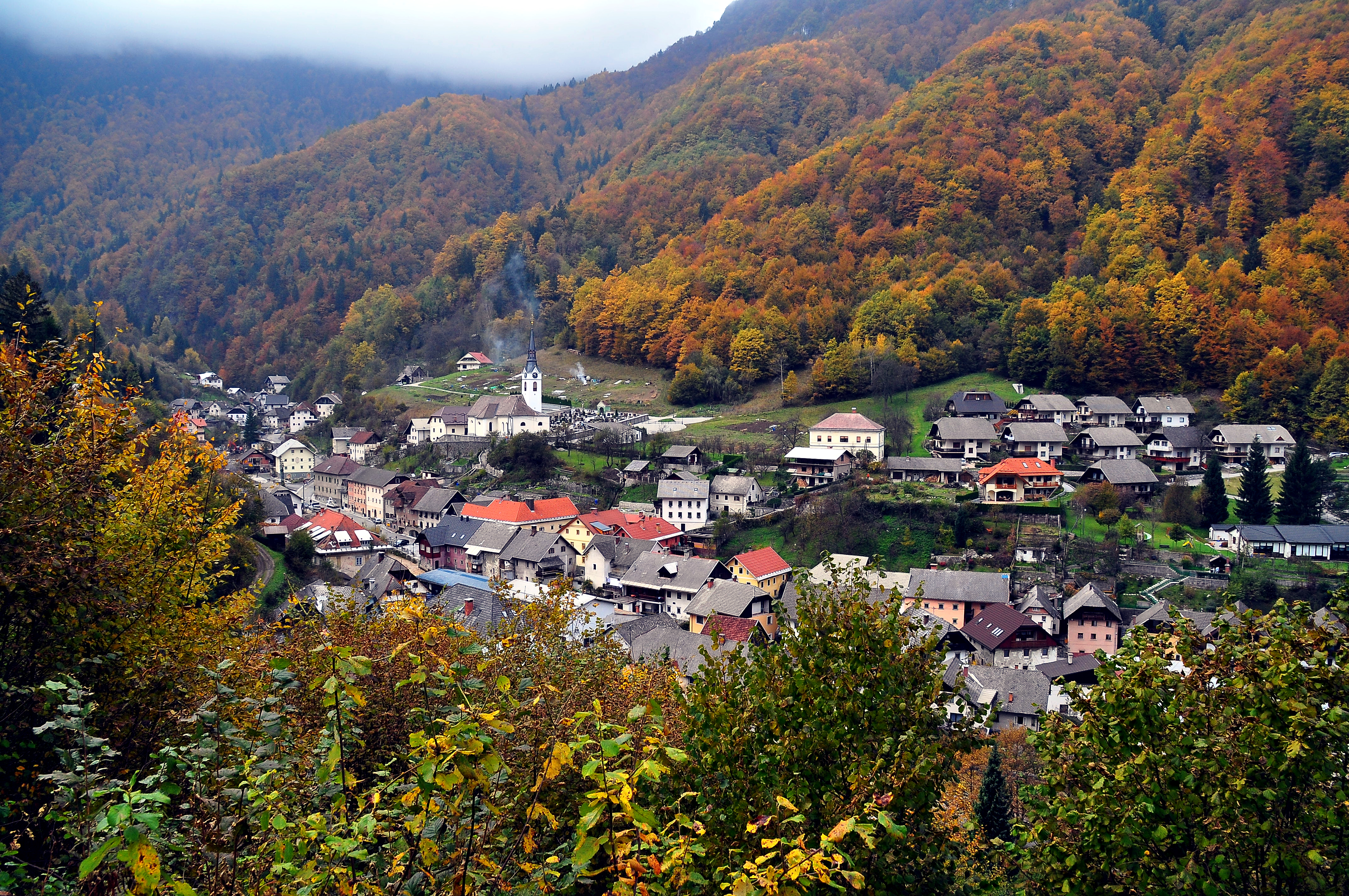

- Location in Slovenia
- Coordinates: 46°17′30.25″N 14°12′18.58″E
- Country: Slovenia
- Traditional region: Upper Carniola
- Statistical region: Upper Carniola
- Municipality: Radovljica
- Elevation: 493.6 m (1,619 ft)

Population (2025)
  - Total: 756

Kropa (pronounced [ˈkɾoːpa]) is a settlement in the Municipality of Radovljica in the Upper Carniola region of Slovenia.

== Name ==
The settlement was first attested in 1498 as Chropp or Krupp. It is believed to derive from the identical hydronym (now Kroparica Creek), first attested in 1481 as pach Khrappa or Khroppa, which has its source at Kroparica Spring (Slovene: Izvir Kroparice) above the settlement. The hydronym is derived from the Slovene common noun kropa 'powerful spring'.

== Metalworking ==
It is known for its traditional smithies, which produce a variety of decorative metal fittings. There is an iron forging museum in Kropa. Metalworking has an ancient tradition in Kropa, with evidence of metalworks from Celtic times in the wider area and the earliest furnaces actually in Kropa from the 14th century onwards.

== Churches ==
There are two churches in Kropa: St Leonard's Church and a church dedicated to the Virgin Mary. Saint Leonard's Church is originally a Gothic structure that was expanded in 1694, remodeled in the Baroque style in 1768, and extended in 1862. It stands below the Jelovica Plateau on the northwest edge of the historic center of Kropa and is flanked by the cemetery. The chancel and nave with two side chapels are barrel-vaulted and were painted by Matija Bradaška in 1900 and 1901. The church's Baroque altars were created by Peter Žiwobski and the paintings are by Leopold Layer, Ivana Kobilca, Matevž Langus, and others. Saint Mary's Church stands on a slope east of the historic town center. It is a Baroque structure with a rectangular nave and chancel, and a semicircular side chapel dating from 1712. The bell tower is Baroque with a neo-Gothic roof and an entry portico in the lower part. The furnishings of the church are Baroque.

== Gallery ==
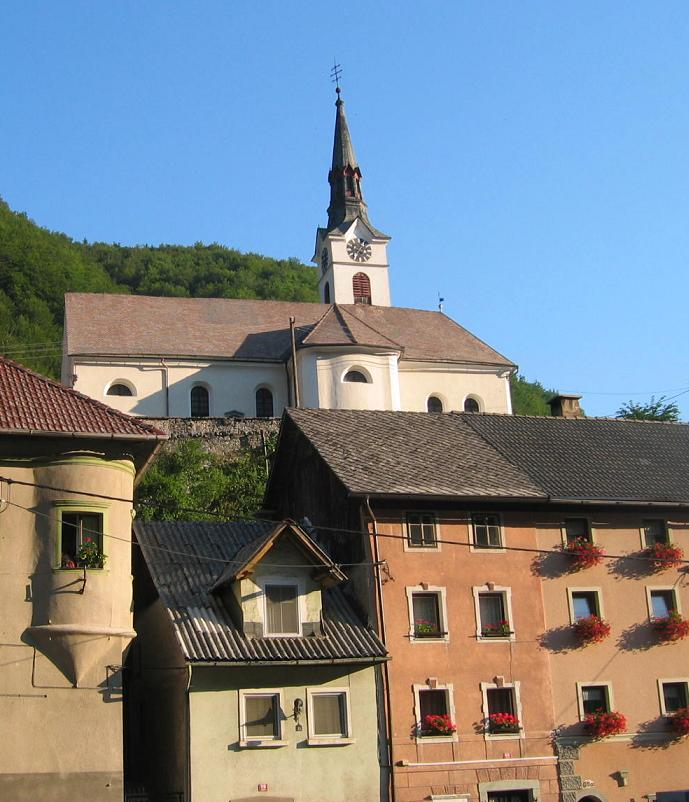
St. Leonard's Church, Kropa

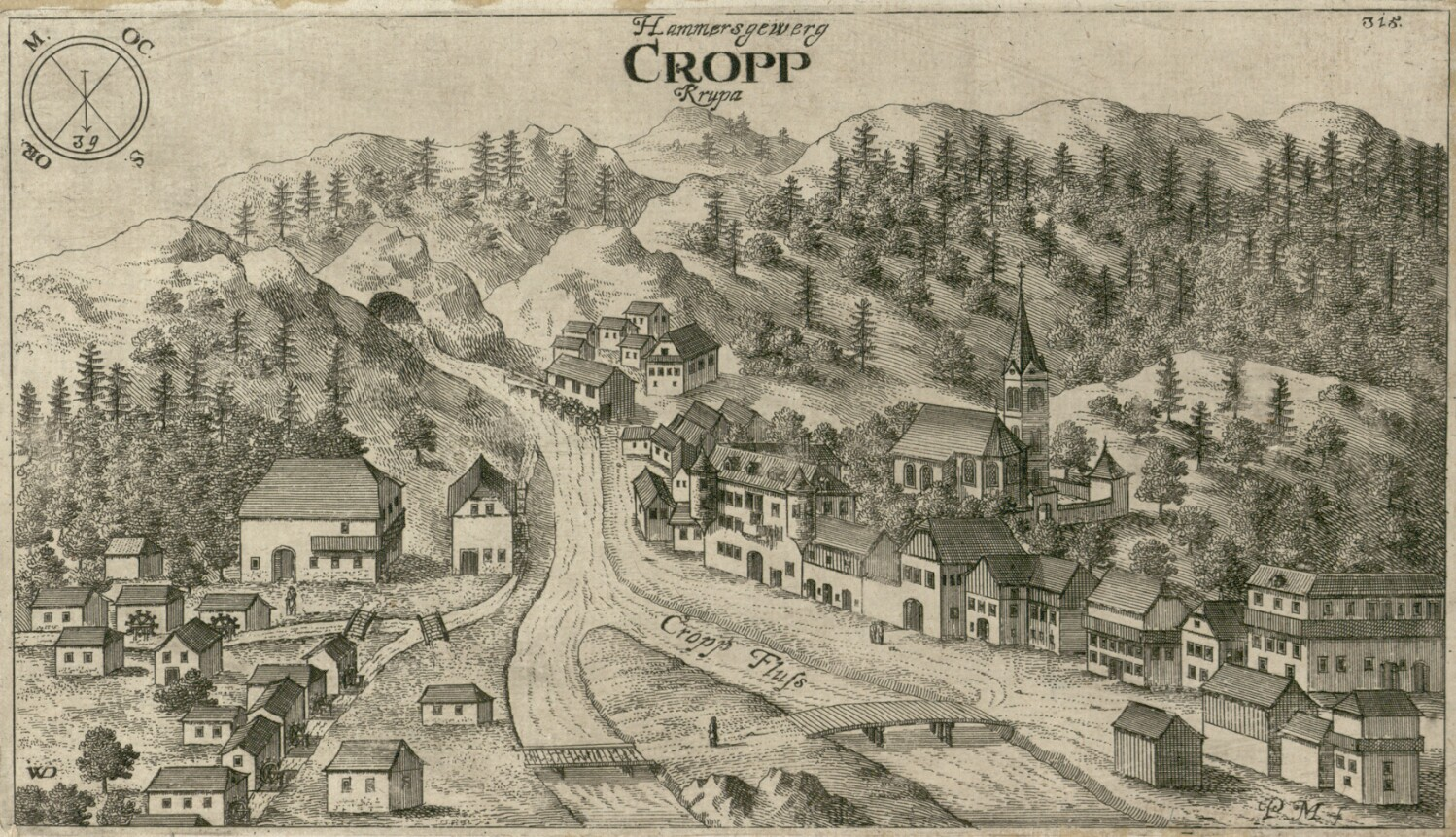
Kropa in an engraving from 1679

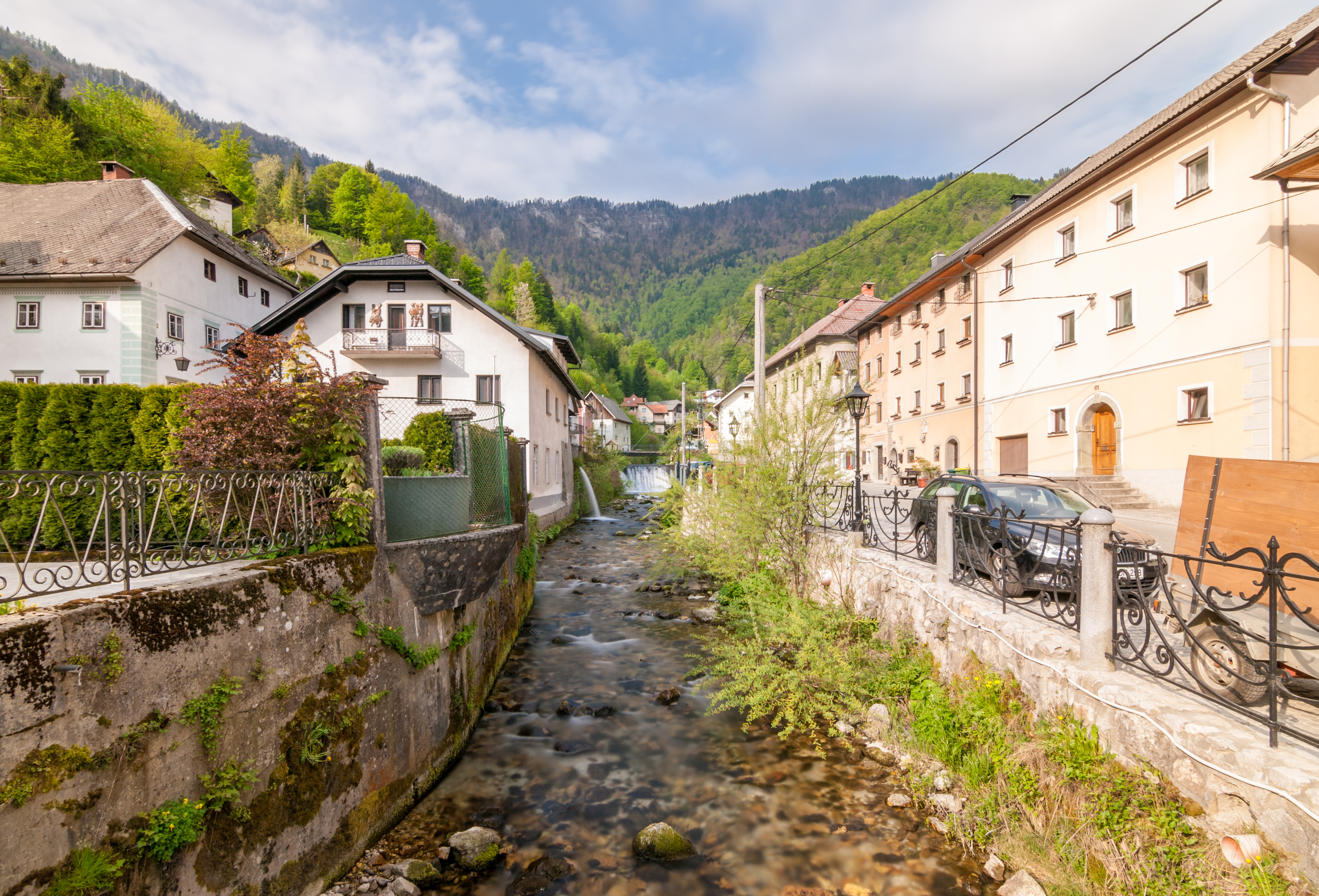
Kroparica Creek in Kropa

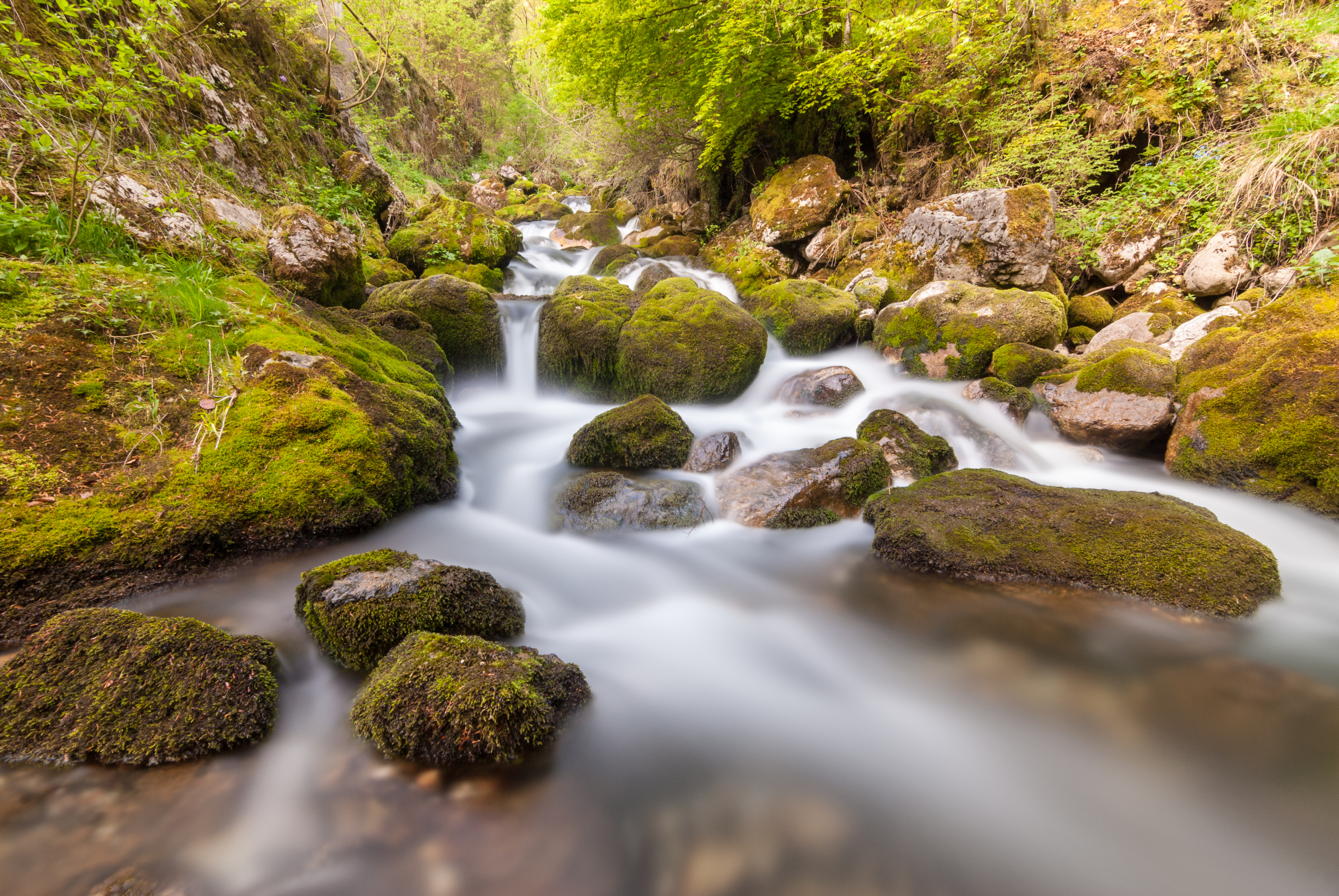
Kroparica Creek near Kropa

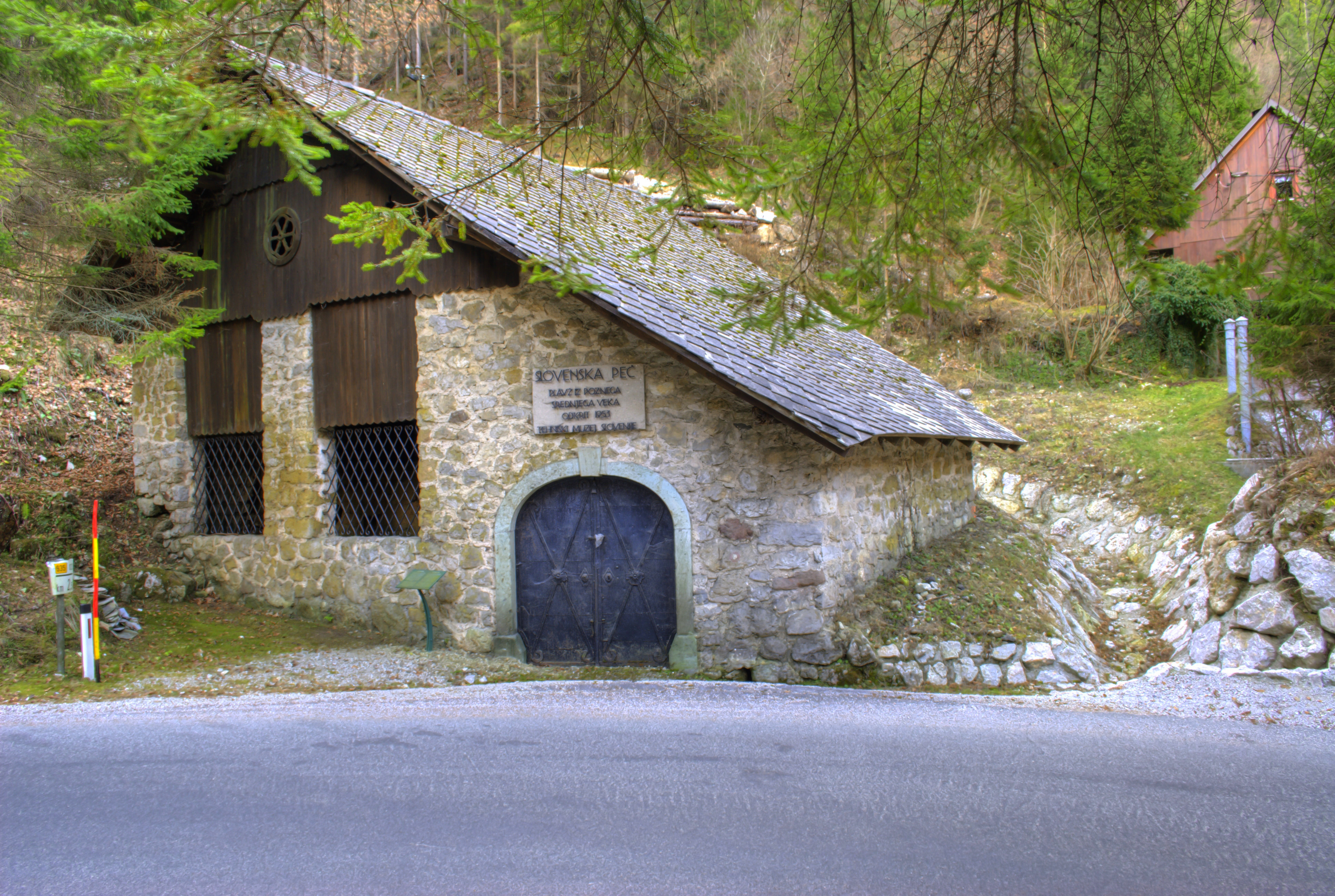
Blast furnace from the late Middle Ages

== Notable people ==
Notable people that were born or lived in Kropa include:

- Anton Dermota (1910–1989), tenor
- Janez Potočnik (born 1958), European commissioner
