= Račje Selo =

- Location in Slovenia
- Coordinates: 45°55′33.72″N 14°59′57.19″E
- Country: Slovenia
- Traditional region: Lower Carniola
- Statistical region: Southeast Slovenia
- Municipality: Trebnje

Area
  - Total: 1.62 km^{2} (0.63 sq mi)
- Elevation: 316 m (1,037 ft)

Population (2002)
  - Total: 74

Račje Selo (pronounced [ˈɾaːtʃjɛ ˈsɛːlɔ]; Slovene: Račje selo, German: Rappelgeschieß) is a village north of Trebnje in eastern Slovenia. The area is part of the historical region of Lower Carniola. The municipality is now included in the Southeast Slovenia Statistical Region.

== Name ==
The name Račje selo developed from the phrase *Radęťe selo 'Radę's village', thus referring to an early inhabitant of the place. The Slovene name is not connected with raca 'duck' or rak 'crab', which also form the adjective račji. In the past, the village was known as Rappelgeschieß in German. The German name is a compound; the first part refers to a Count Rapoto or Rappold attested in the area in 1062, probably shortened from Radebald and also the source of the Slovene name *Radę. The second part of the German name means 'seat, possession' (cf. German Gesitze 'domicile, dwelling'), thus 'Radebald's possession'.

== Church ==
The local church is dedicated to Saint Florian and belongs to the Parish of Trebnje. It dates to the 16th century with some 17th-century modifications.
