= Hell Gorge =

Coordinates: 45.891113°N 14.374259°E

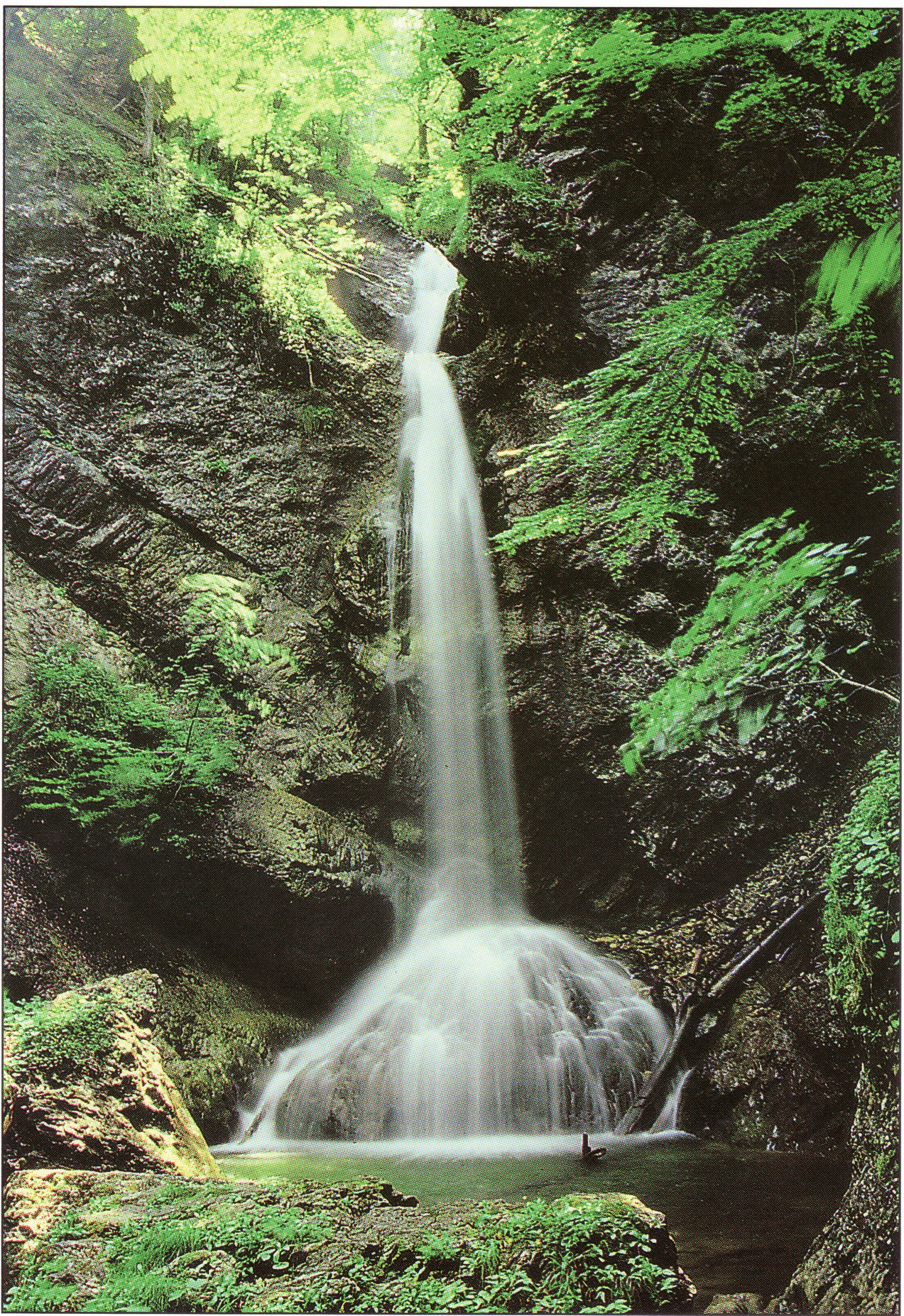
Borovniščica Creek creating a waterfall in Hell Gorge

Hell Gorge (Slovene: soteska Pekel) is a 1.5-kilometre (0.93 mi) gorge in central Slovenia, located near the settlement of Ohonica, 4 km (2.5 mi) southwest of the village of Borovnica and 23 km (14 mi) from Ljubljana. Borovniščica Creek has created many erosion features such as pools, rapids, and waterfalls, of which five are extremely beautiful and well known because they plunge from 20 to 5 m (66 to 16 ft). It has been proclaimed a natural value of national significance.

== History ==
The word pekel 'hell' has been generalized in Slovene to refer to secretive, frightening, isolated, hard-to-reach places, such as gorges and caves, where the Devil and other imaginary creatures are believed to live; compare also Hell Cave.

The first footpaths through Hell Gorge were made over one hundred years ago by charcoal burners collecting wood for charcoal. There were several mills and sawmills above and below the inaccessible gorge; some remains of these can still be seen today.

The first records about Hell Gorge as a tourist attraction were published in 1897 by Josip Ciril Oblak, who named it "a tourist heaven." At that time organized groups of hikers also started coming to Hell Gorge. It was officially opened to the public on June 29, 1904, after the original footpath that leads to the second waterfall and a wooden ladder to the third one were created. The complete footpath, including bridges and ladders, leading through the gorge was finished in 1925 and later renovated on a regular basis.

== Geology ==
The deeply cut bed of Otavščica Creek flows down into the Ljubljana Marsh (335 m) from the Bloke–Rakitna Plateau (650 m) and changes its name to the Borovniščica. The gorge is carved into layers of dolomite. The steeply cascading tectonic fault in this area indicated the way for the water to flow. Intensive tectonics caused the formation of several geomorphological curiosities: a solitary mountain named the Devil's Tooth (Hudičev zob), a natural window (the jag in the Devil's Tooth), and precipitous rock walls. Fossils of some seashells and snails can be found in the gorge.

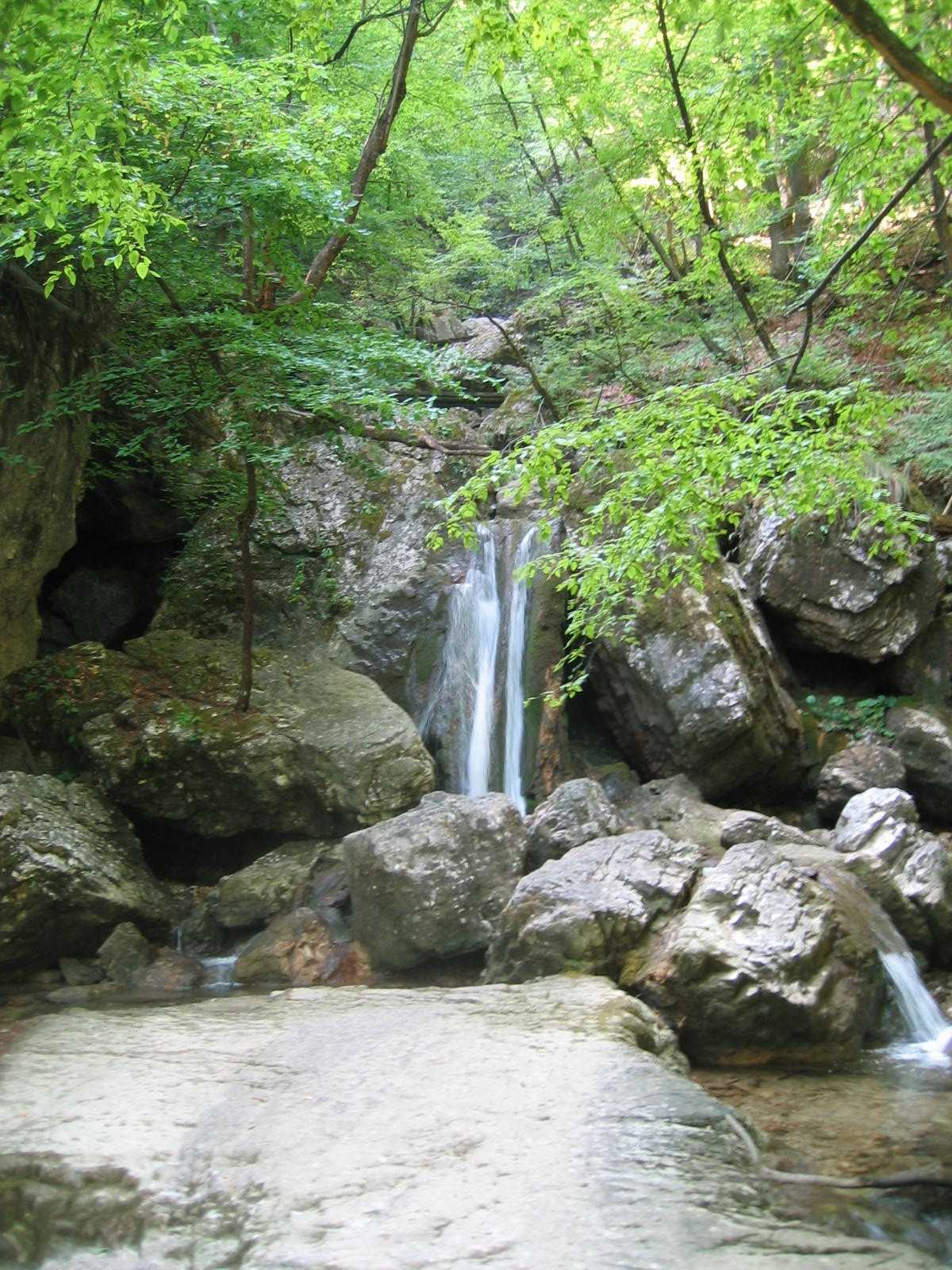
Waterfall 1

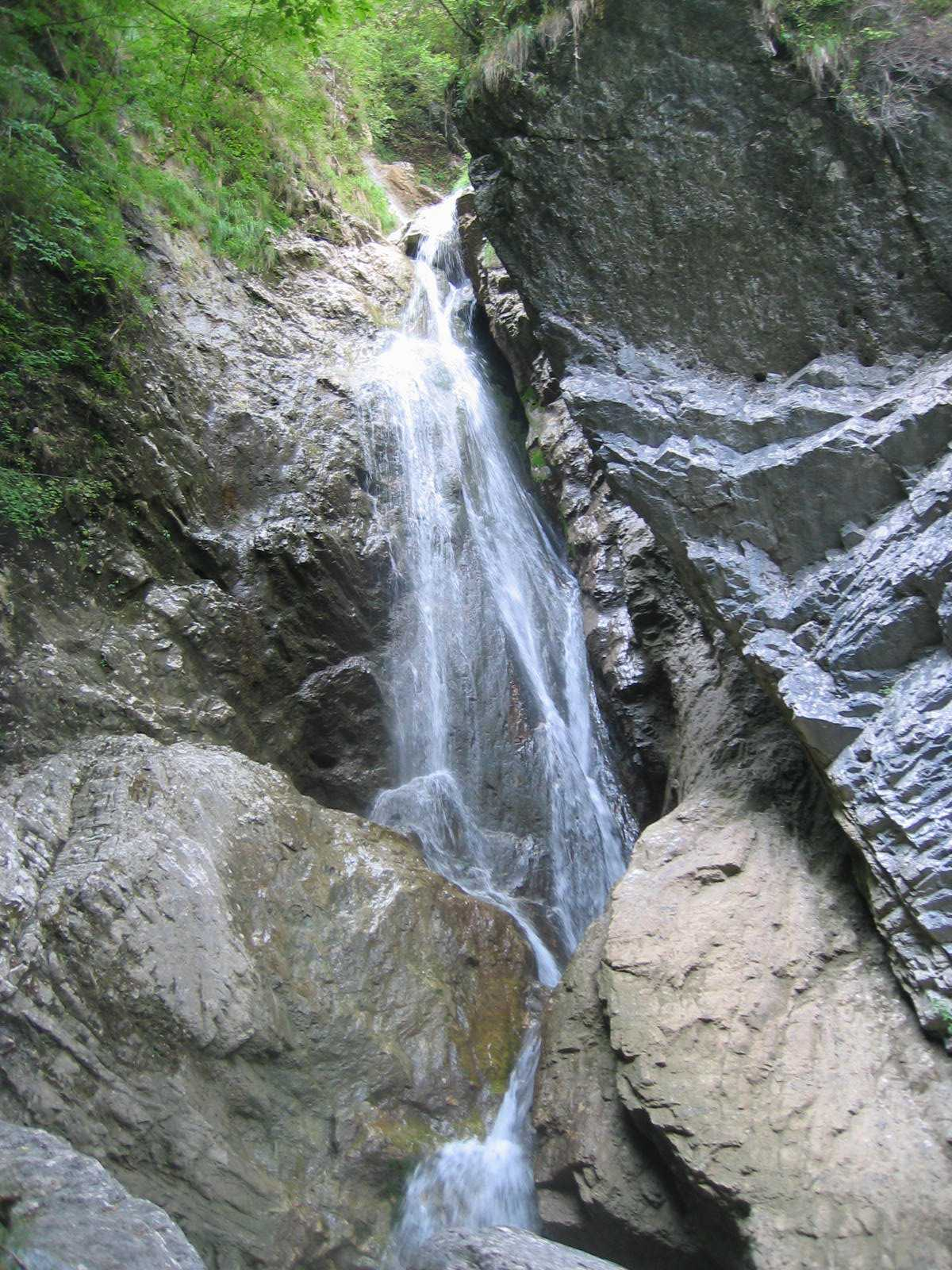
Waterfall 2

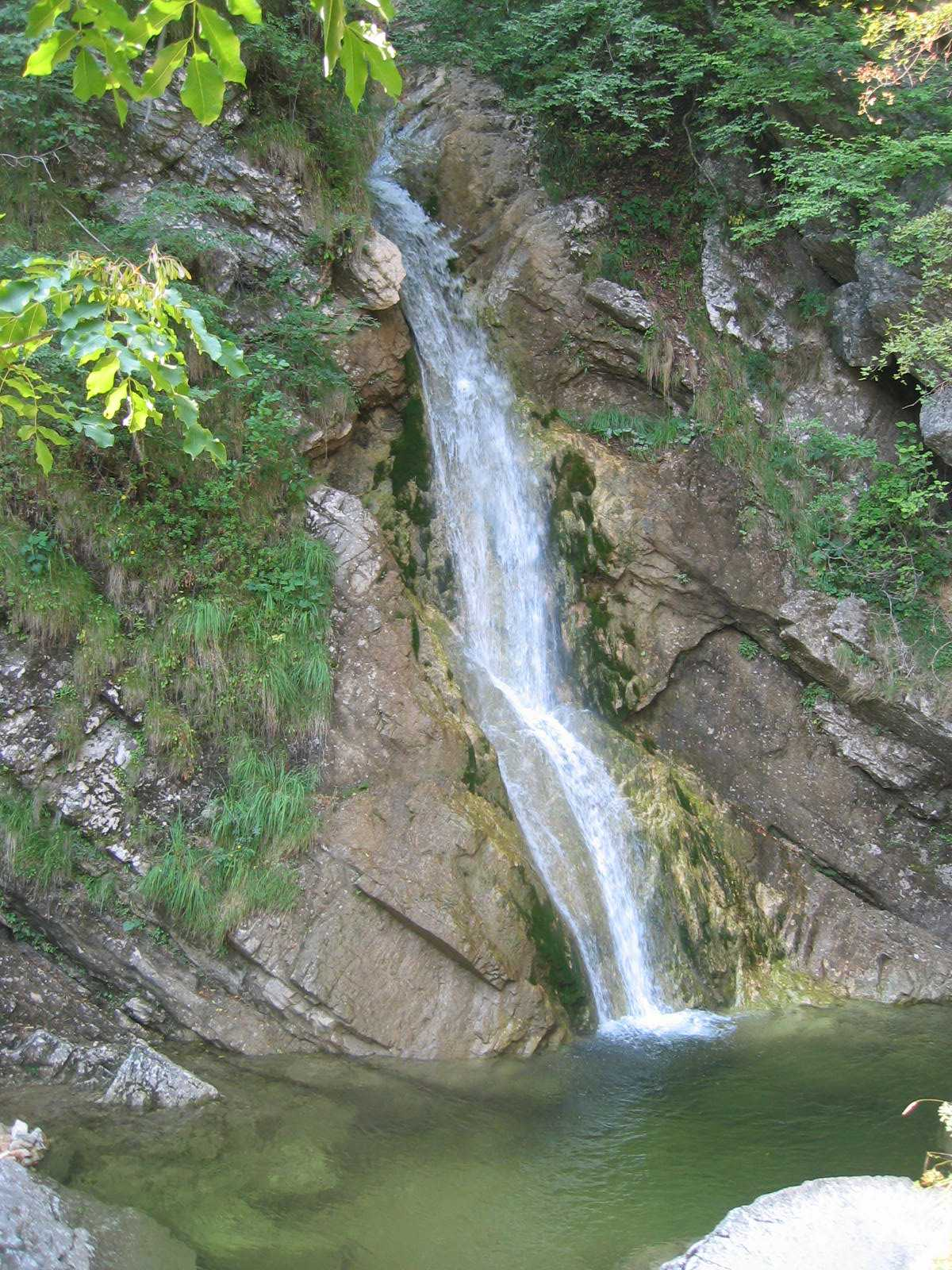
Waterfall 3

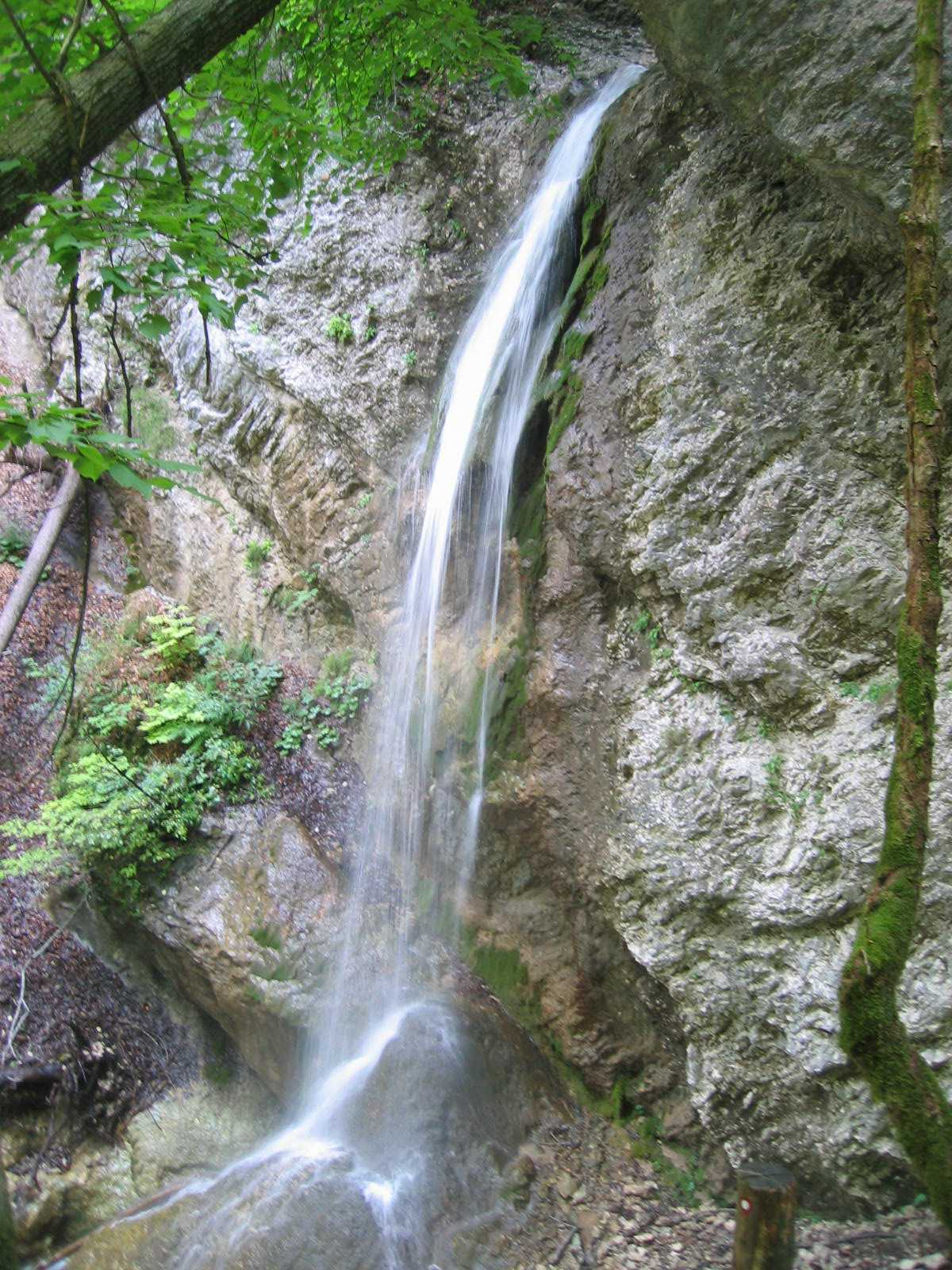
Waterfall 4

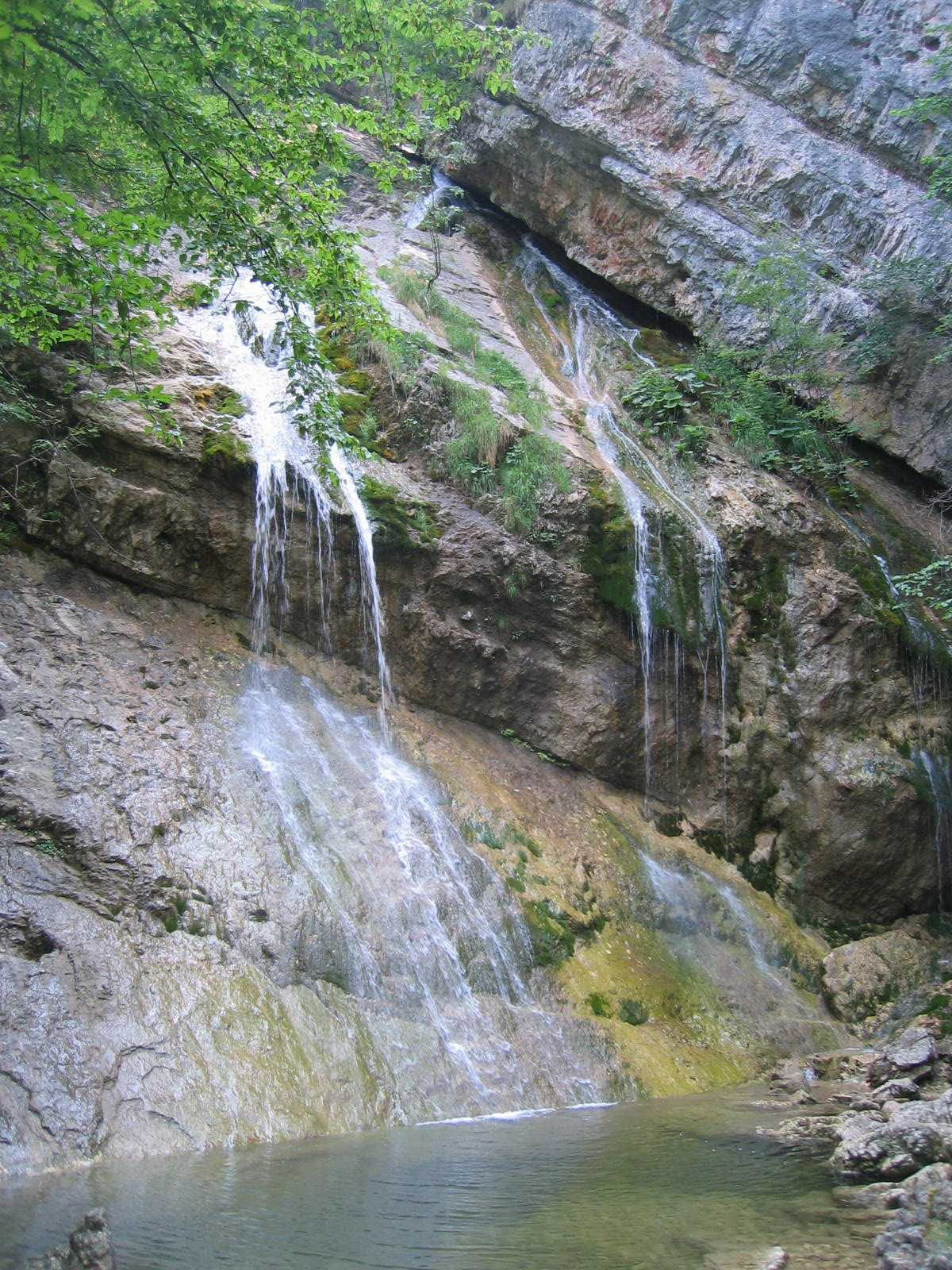
Waterfall 5

Trail infrastructure:

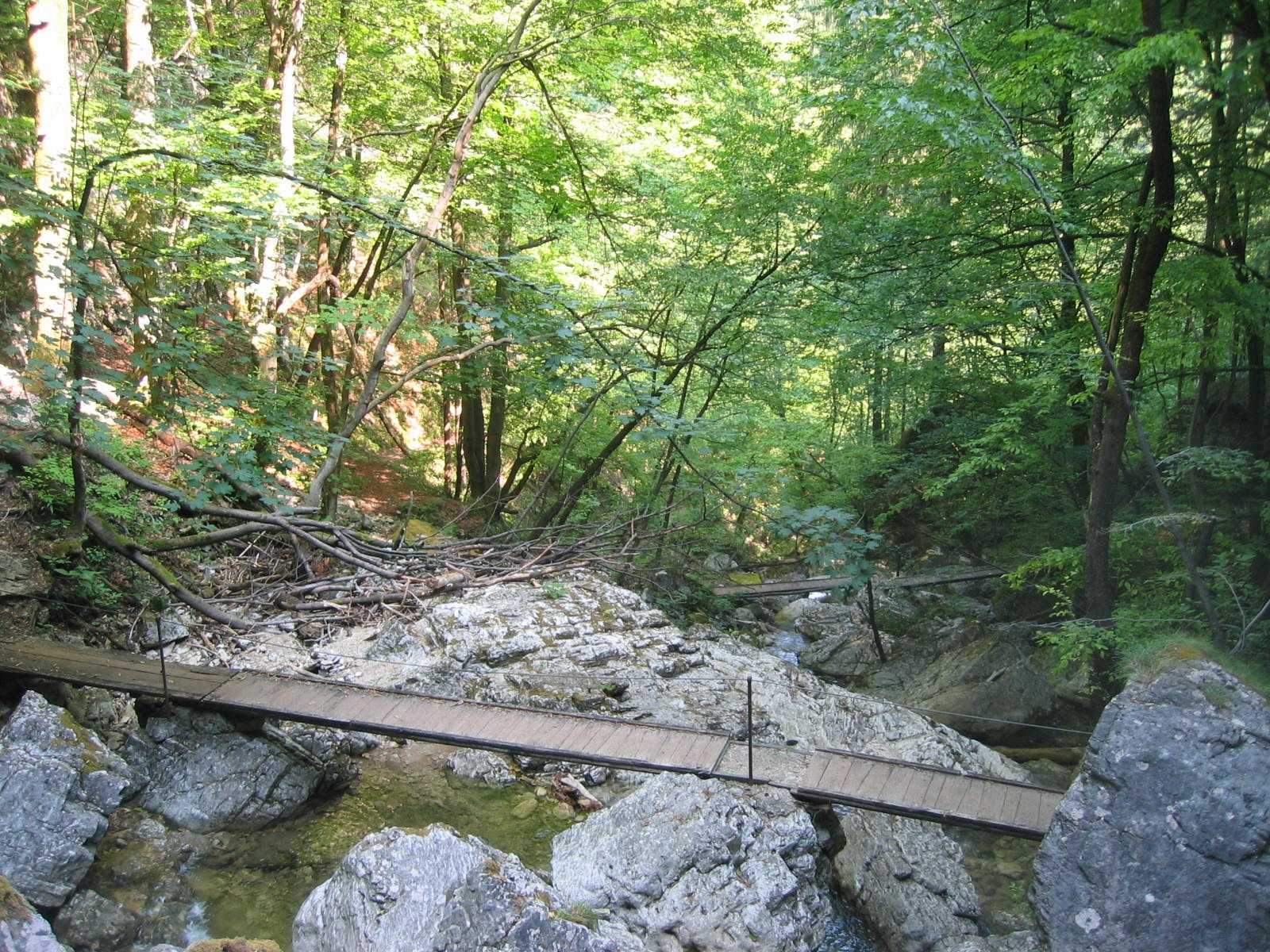

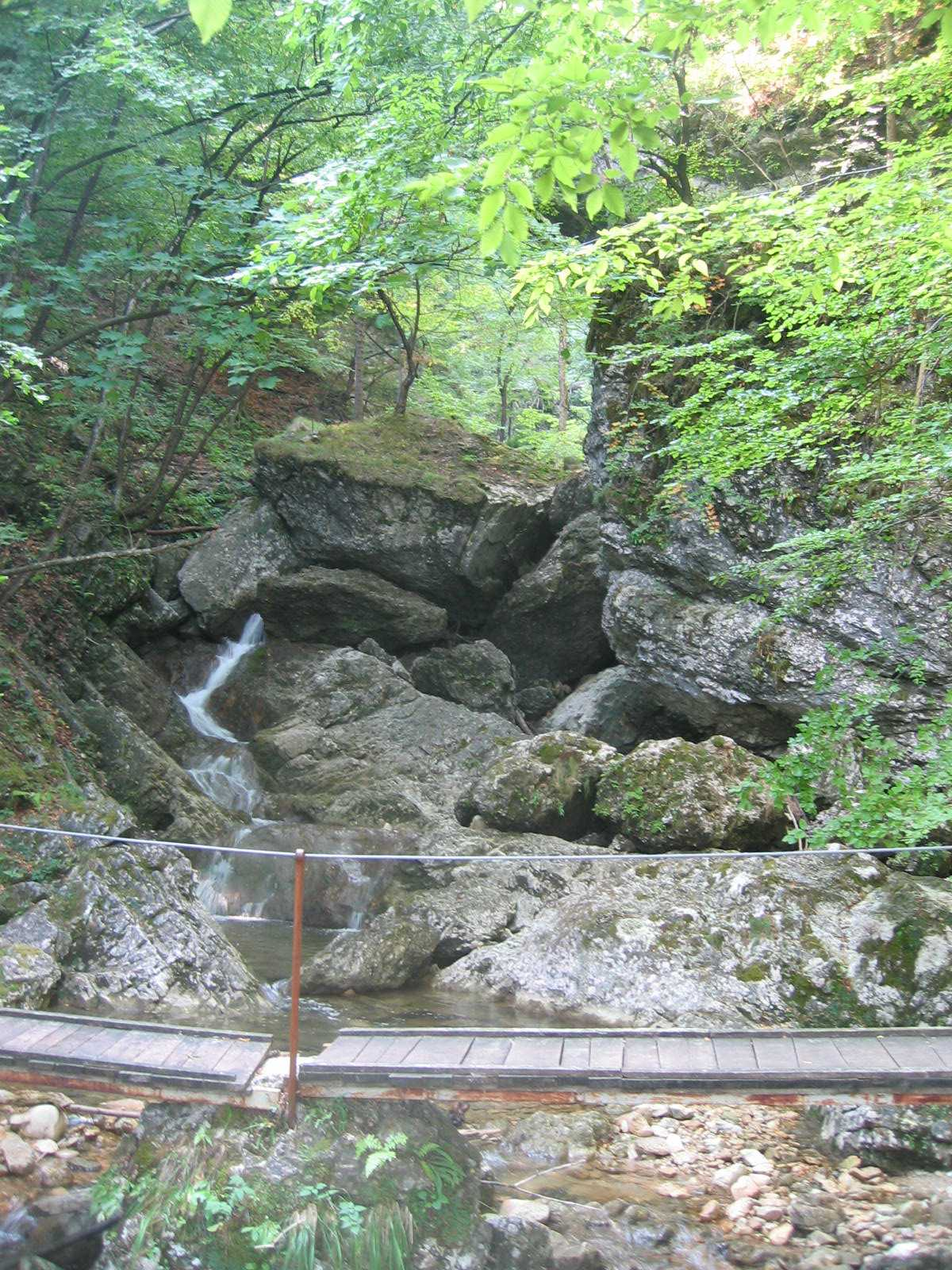

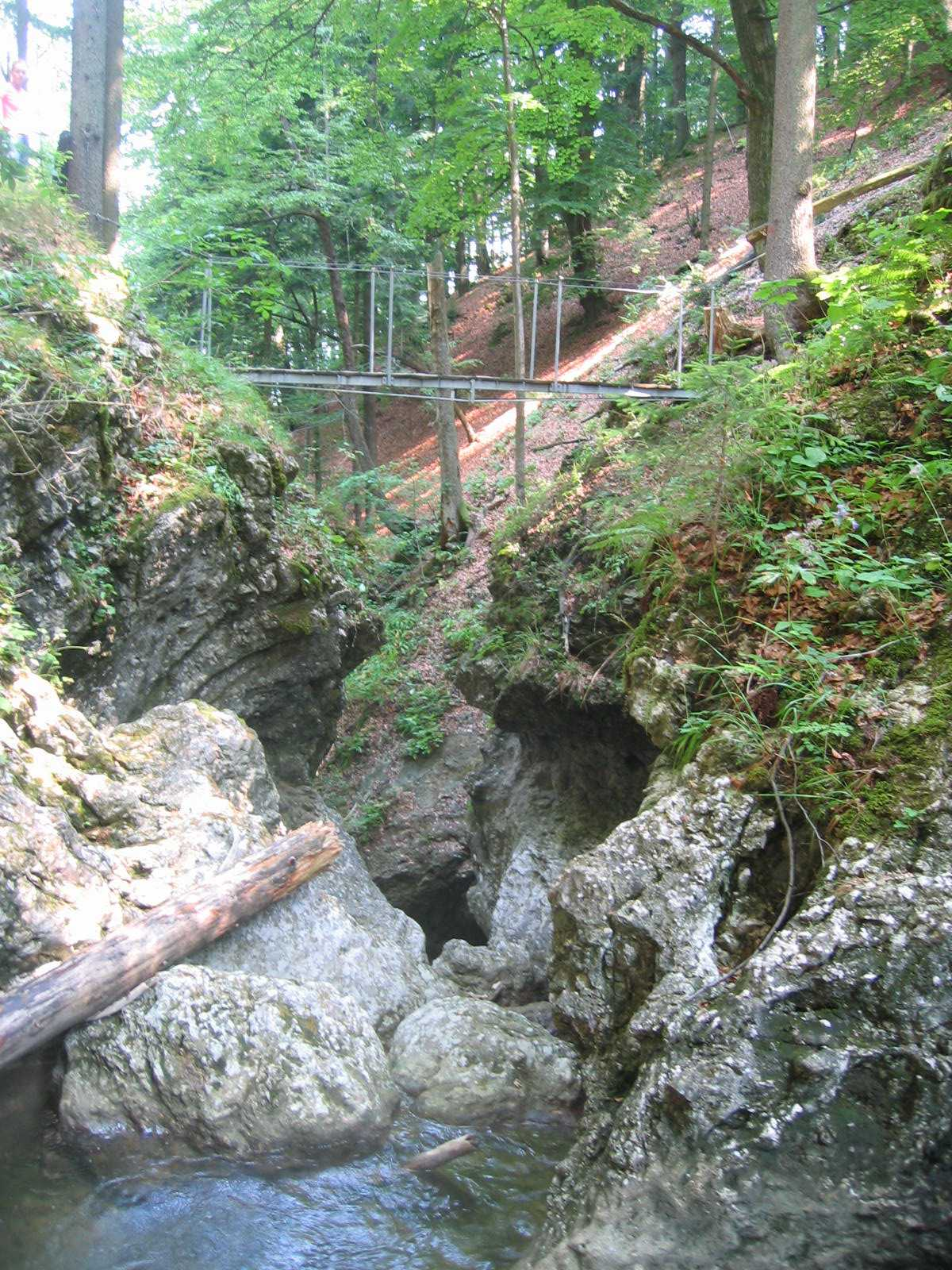

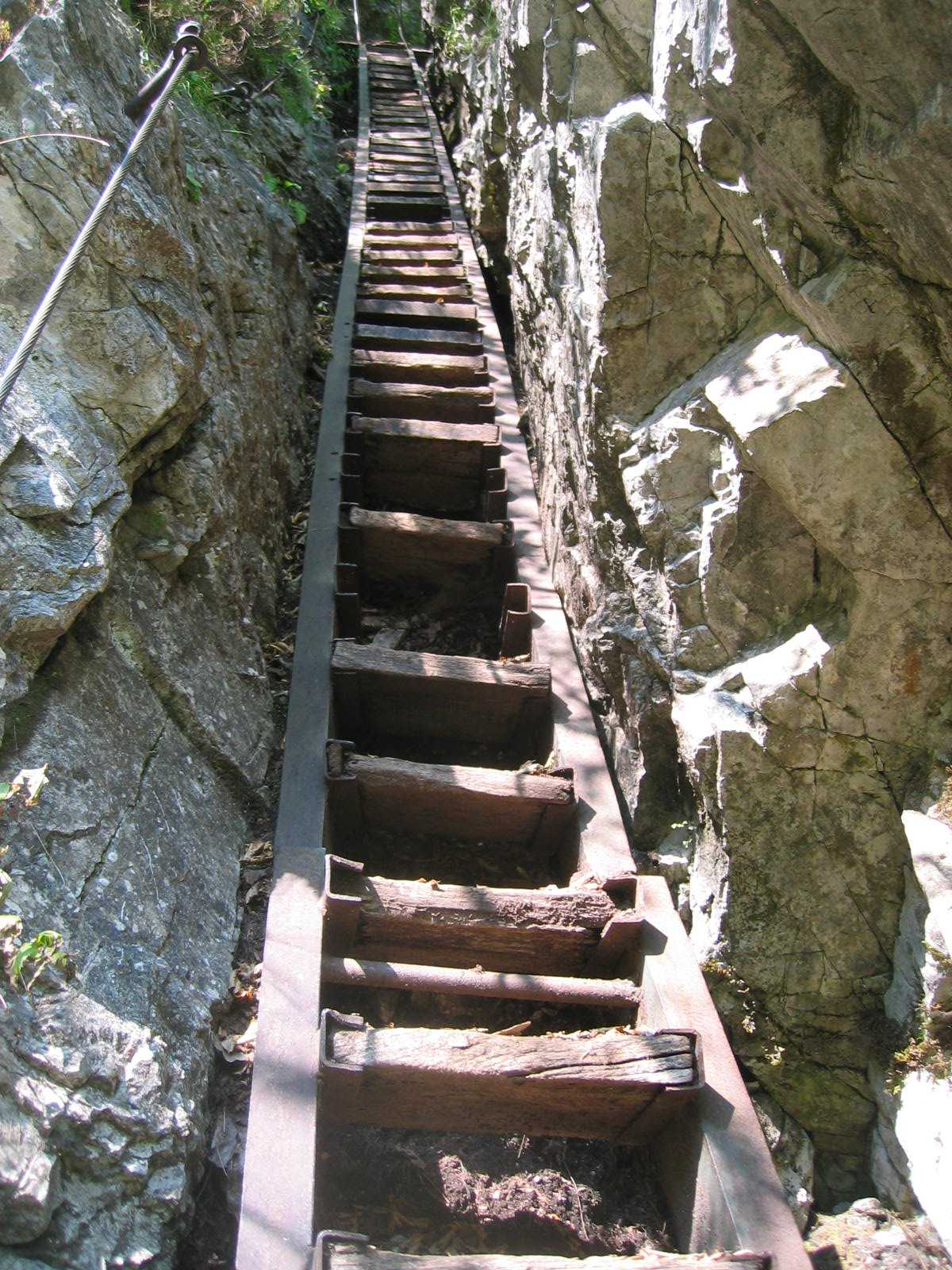

== Biology ==
Both Alpine and Dinaric vegetation can be seen in Hell Gorge, including the endemic Carniolan primrose (Primula carniolica). There is also a large variety of tree species. One can encounter chamois and the white-throated dipper, which also nests in the gorge.
