= Parož =

- Location in Slovenia
- Coordinates: 46°21′46.52″N 15°13′6.02″E
- Country: Slovenia
- Traditional region: Styria
- Statistical region: Savinja
- Municipality: Dobrna

Area
  - Total: 2.73 km^{2} (1.05 sq mi)
- Elevation: 556 m (1,824 ft)

Population (2020)
  - Total: 54
  - Density: 20/km^{2} (51/sq mi)

Parož (pronounced [ˈpaːɾɔʃ]) is a dispersed settlement in the upper valley of Dobrnica Creek, a minor right tributary of the Hudinja River, in Slovenia. It belongs to the Municipality of Dobrna. The area is part of the traditional region of Styria. The municipality is now included in the Savinja Statistical Region.
