= Okrog, Šentjur =

Okrog
- Location in Slovenia
- Coordinates: 46°15′6.92″N 15°28′30.31″E
- Country: Slovenia
- Traditional region: Styria
- Statistical region: Savinja
- Municipality: Šentjur

Area
  - Total: 1.8 km^{2} (0.69 sq mi)
- Elevation: 332.5 m (1,091 ft)

Population (2020)
  - Total: 112
  - Density: 62/km^{2} (160/sq mi)

Okrog (pronounced [ɔˈkɾoːk]) is a settlement in the Municipality of Šentjur, eastern Slovenia. It lies in the hills east of Ponikva. The settlement, and the entire municipality, are included in the Savinja Statistical Region, which is in the Slovenian portion of the historical Duchy of Styria.
