= Sirje =

Sirje may refer to:

== Places ==
- Širje, settlement in Slovenia
- Veliko Širje, settlement in Slovenia

== People ==
- Sirje Eichelmann (born 1955), Estonian track and field athlete
- Sirje Endre (born 1945), Estonian journalist, politician and entrepreneur
- Sirje Helme (born 1949), Estonian art historian and art critic
- Sirje Kingsepp (born 1969), Estonian politician and reality TV participant
- Sirje Kivimäe (born 1947), Estonian historian
- Sirje Olesk (born 1954), Estonian literary scholar and critic
- Sirje Roops (born 1992), Estonian footballer
- Sirje Runge (born 1950), Estonian painter and designer
- Sirje Tennosaar (1943–2021), Estonian actress and television presenter
