= Senožete, Laško =

Senožete
- Location in Slovenia
- Coordinates: 46°6′48.75″N 15°12′12.14″E
- Country: Slovenia
- Traditional region: Styria
- Statistical region: Savinja
- Municipality: Laško

Area
  - Total: 0.41 km^{2} (0.16 sq mi)
- Elevation: 441.3 m (1,448 ft)

Population (2002)
  - Total: 42
- Postal code: 3272

Senožete (pronounced [sɛnɔˈʒeːtɛ]) is a small settlement in the Municipality of Laško in eastern Slovenia. It lies just south of Rimske Toplice. The area is part of the traditional region of Styria. It is now included with the rest of the municipality in the Savinja Statistical Region.

The Slovene poet Anton Aškerc lived most of his childhood in the village. His house is now a small memorial and ethnographic museum.
