= Lokavec, Laško =

Lokavec
- Location in Slovenia
- Coordinates: 46°5′48.5″N 15°14′56.74″E
- Country: Slovenia
- Traditional region: Styria
- Statistical region: Savinja
- Municipality: Laško

Area
  - Total: 7.02 km^{2} (2.71 sq mi)
- Elevation: 357.9 m (1,174 ft)

Population (2002)
  - Total: 192
- Postal code: 3272

Lokavec (pronounced [lɔˈkaːʋəts]) is a settlement in the Municipality of Laško in eastern Slovenia. It lies in the hills southeast of Rimske Toplice. The area is part of the traditional region of Styria. It is now included with the rest of the municipality in the Savinja Statistical Region.

The local church is dedicated to Saint Coloman and belongs to the Parish of Sveti Miklavž nad Laškim. It dates to the early 16th century. The belfry was added in the 18th century.
