= Modric =

Modric may refer to:

- Modrić (surname), a Croatian surname with a list of notable people
  - Luka Modrić (born 1985), Croatian footballer who plays for AC Milan and captains the Croatia national team
- Modrič (disambiguation), toponym found in South Slavic countries

== See also ==
- Modrica (disambiguation), toponym found in South Slavic countries
- Modřice (Modritz), a small town in Czech Republic
- Modriach, a small settlement and former municipality in Styria, Austria
