= Lahomno =

- Location in Slovenia
- Coordinates: 46°8′32.93″N 15°15′47.81″E
- Country: Slovenia
- Traditional region: Styria
- Statistical region: Savinja
- Municipality: Laško

Area
  - Total: 1.82 km^{2} (0.70 sq mi)
- Elevation: 281.9 m (925 ft)

Population (2002)
  - Total: 243
- Postal code: 3270

Lahomno (pronounced [laˈxoːmnɔ]) is a settlement in the Municipality of Laško in eastern Slovenia. It lies in the valley of Lahomnica Creek (also known as Lahomščica Creek), a minor left tributary of the Savinja River east of Laško. The area is part of the traditional region of Styria. It is now included with the rest of the municipality in the Savinja Statistical Region.

== Name ==
Lahomno was first attested in written sources in 1209 and 1212–27 as Lachomel (and as Lochmel in 1280–95, and Lochomel in 1338). The name is believed to be derived from *Vlaxomьno selo (literally, 'Vlaxomъ's village'), based on a nickname for Vladislav. Accentual and morphological evidence makes it unlikely that the name is connected with Slovene Lah 'Vlach, Romance-language speaker'.

== Mass graves ==
Lahomno is the site of four clandestine or mass graves from the end of the Second World War. The Lahomščica 1 and 2 graves (Slovene: Grobišče ob Lahomščici 1, 2) both lie along Lahomščica Creek and each contain the remains of one person, probably a Croatian, buried in the first half of May 1945. The first grave is located by the first tree to the right of the bridge on the path to Marija Gradec. The second grave is located opposite the Lešnik farm and 70 meters (230 ft) before the side road to Harje. The Lahomščica 3 Mass Grave (Grobišče ob Lahomščici 3) lies on the left bank of Reka Creek, a tributary of the Lahomščica. It contained the remains of seven Ustaša soldiers that were disinterred in 1990. The Lahomno No. 62 Mass Grave (Grobišče pri hiši Lahomno 62) lies along the road by the farm at Lahomno No. 62, by a hornbeam hedge. It contains the remains of three people.
