= Sveti Peter =

Sveti Peter may refer to several places in Slovenia:

- Bistrica ob Sotli, a settlement in the Municipality of Bistrica ob Sotli, known as Sveti Peter pod Svetimi Gorami until 1952
- Obrežje pri Zidanem Mostu, a settlement in the Municipality of Laško, known as Sveti Peter pri Loki until 1955
- Olešče, a settlement in the Municipality of Laško, known as Sveti Peter pri Jurkloštru until 1959
- Šempeter v Savinjski Dolini, a settlement in the Municipality of Žalec, known as Sveti Peter v Savinjski dolini until 1952
- Sv. Peter, Piran, a settlement in the Municipality of Piran
