= Trnovo, Laško =

Trnovo
- Location in Slovenia
- Coordinates: 46°8′51.59″N 15°11′27.39″E
- Country: Slovenia
- Traditional region: Styria
- Statistical region: Savinja
- Municipality: Laško

Area
  - Total: 0.81 km^{2} (0.31 sq mi)
- Elevation: 378.4 m (1,241 ft)

Population (2002)
  - Total: 90
- Postal code: 3270

Trnovo (pronounced [ˈtəɾnɔʋɔ]) is a settlement in the Municipality of Laško in eastern Slovenia. It lies in hills above the right bank of the Savinja River east of Sedraž. The area is part of the traditional region of Styria. It is now included with the rest of the municipality in the Savinja Statistical Region.
