= Globoko, Laško =

Globoko
- Location in Slovenia
- Coordinates: 46°7′24.04″N 15°12′22.52″E
- Country: Slovenia
- Traditional region: Styria
- Statistical region: Savinja
- Municipality: Laško

Area
  - Total: 1.25 km^{2} (0.48 sq mi)
- Elevation: 225 m (738 ft)

Population (2002)
  - Total: 202
- Postal code: 3272

Globoko (pronounced [ɡlɔˈbɔːkɔ]) is a settlement on the left bank of the Savinja River, opposite Rimske Toplice in the Municipality of Laško in eastern Slovenia. The railway line from Zidani Most to Celje runs through the settlement. The area is part of the traditional region of Styria. It is now included with the rest of the municipality in the Savinja Statistical Region.

== Notable people ==
Notable people that were born or lived in Globoko include:

- Anton Aškerc (1856–1912), poet
- Drago Ulaga (1906–2000), gymnast, sports teacher
