= Lože, Laško =

Lože
- Location in Slovenia
- Coordinates: 46°7′5.41″N 15°13′49.08″E
- Country: Slovenia
- Traditional region: Styria
- Statistical region: Savinja
- Municipality: Laško

Area
  - Total: 1.46 km^{2} (0.56 sq mi)
- Elevation: 367.8 m (1,207 ft)

Population (2002)
  - Total: 103
- Postal code: 3272

Lože (pronounced [ˈloːʒɛ]) is a settlement in the Municipality of Laško in eastern Slovenia. It lies in the hills above the right bank of the Savinja River, east of Rimske Toplice. The area is part of the traditional region of Lower Styria. It is now included with the rest of the municipality in the Savinja Statistical Region.
