= Sveti Rupert =

Sveti Rupert may refer to several places in Slovenia:

- Šentrupert, Braslovče, a settlement in the Municipality of Braslovče, known as Sveti Rupert until 1955
- Šentrupert, Laško, a settlement in the Municipality of Laško, known as Sveti Rupert until 1952
