= Šempeter =

Šempeter may refer to several places in Slovenia:

- Olešče, a settlement in the Municipality of Laško (formerly and locally known as Šempeter)
- Otočec, a settlement in the Municipality of Novo Mesto (formerly and locally known as Šempeter)
- Pivka, a settlement in the Municipality of Pivka (formerly and locally known as Šempeter)
- Šempeter, Ljubljana, a neighborhood in Ljubljana
- Šempeter pri Gorici, a settlement in the Municipality of Šempeter–Vrtojba
- Šempeter v Savinjski Dolini, a settlement in the Municipality of Žalec
