= Strensko =

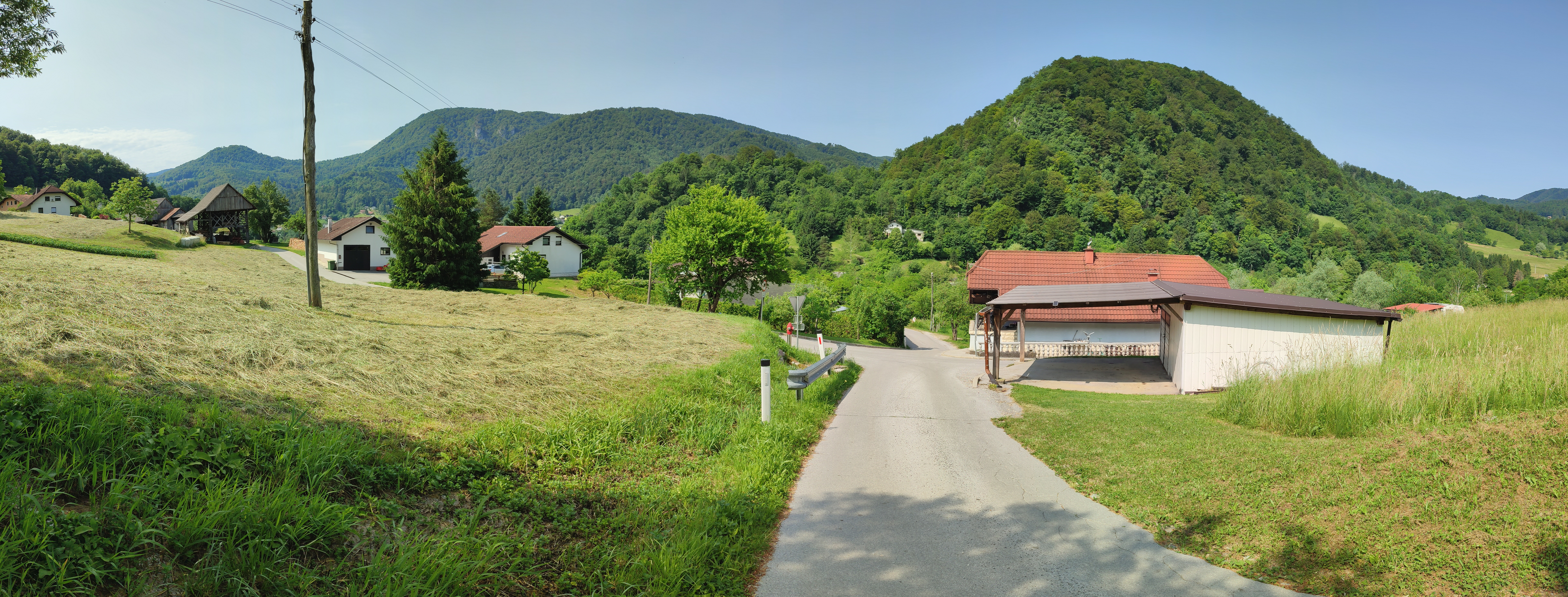

- Location in Slovenia
- Coordinates: 46°7′56.8″N 15°11′55.62″E
- Country: Slovenia
- Traditional region: Styria
- Statistical region: Savinja
- Municipality: Laško

Area
  - Total: 0.79 km^{2} (0.31 sq mi)
- Elevation: 230.7 m (757 ft)

Population (2002)
  - Total: 54
- Postal code: 3272

Strensko (pronounced [ˈstɾeːnskɔ]) is a settlement in the Municipality of Laško in eastern Slovenia. It lies on the left bank of the Savinja River, opposite Rimske Toplice. The railway line from Zidani Most to Celje runs through the settlement. The area is part of the traditional region of Styria. It is now included with the rest of the municipality in the Savinja Statistical Region.
