= Belovo =

Belovo may refer to:

- Belovo, Bulgaria, a town in Pazardzhik Oblast, Bulgaria
- Belovo, Russia, name of several inhabited localities in Russia
- Belovo, Laško, a settlement in the Municipality of Laško, Slovenia
