= Harjes =

Harjes is a surname. Notable people with the surname include:

- Devin Harjes (1983–2025), American film and television actor
- Henry Herman Harjes (1875–1926), French-born American polo player and banker

== See also ==
- Morgan, Harjes & Co., a former French investment bank
- Harje, a village in eastern Slovenia
- Harries, a Welsh surname
