= Dol pri Laškem =

- Location in Slovenia
- Coordinates: 46°7′11.06″N 15°15′15.28″E
- Country: Slovenia
- Traditional region: Styria
- Statistical region: Savinja
- Municipality: Laško

Area
  - Total: 0.95 km^{2} (0.37 sq mi)
- Elevation: 355 m (1,165 ft)

Population (2002)
  - Total: 36
- Postal code: 3272

Dol pri Laškem (pronounced [ˈdoːl pɾi ˈlaːʃkɛm] or [ˈdoːu̯ pɾi ˈlaːʃkɛm]) is a settlement east of Rimske Toplice in the Municipality of Laško in eastern Slovenia. The area is part of the traditional region of Styria. It is now included with the rest of the municipality in the Savinja Statistical Region.
