= Leskovca =

- Location in Slovenia
- Coordinates: 46°8′10.33″N 15°17′29.28″E
- Country: Slovenia
- Traditional region: Styria
- Statistical region: Savinja
- Municipality: Laško

Area
  - Total: 0.88 km^{2} (0.34 sq mi)
- Elevation: 434.1 m (1,424 ft)

Population (2002)
  - Total: 82
- Postal code: 3270

Leskovca (pronounced [ˈleːskɔu̯tsa]) is a settlement in the Municipality of Laško in eastern Slovenia. It lies in the hills east of Laško. The area is part of the traditional region of Styria. It is now included with the rest of the municipality in the Savinja Statistical Region.

== History ==
Leskovca became a separate settlement in 1980, when it was administratively separated from Male Grahovše.
