= Sevce =

- Location in Slovenia
- Coordinates: 46°9′14.66″N 15°18′21.35″E
- Country: Slovenia
- Traditional region: Styria
- Statistical region: Savinja
- Municipality: Laško

Area
  - Total: 1.16 km^{2} (0.45 sq mi)
- Elevation: 406.1 m (1,332 ft)

Population (2002)
  - Total: 76
- Postal code: 3270

Sevce (pronounced [ˈseːu̯tsɛ]) is a settlement in the Municipality of Laško in eastern Slovenia. It lies on the right bank of the Savinja River, north of Rimske Toplice. The area is part of the traditional region of Styria. It is now included with the rest of the municipality in the Savinja Statistical Region.
