= Povčeno =

- Location in Slovenia
- Coordinates: 46°7′49.88″N 15°13′1.28″E
- Country: Slovenia
- Traditional region: Styria
- Statistical region: Savinja
- Municipality: Laško

Area
  - Total: 0.66 km^{2} (0.25 sq mi)
- Elevation: 367.2 m (1,205 ft)

Population (2002)
  - Total: 55
- Postal code: 3272

Povčeno (pronounced [ˈpoːu̯tʃɛnɔ]) is a settlement in the Municipality of Laško in eastern Slovenia. It lies in the hills east of Rimske Toplice. The area is part of the traditional region of Styria. It is now included with the rest of the municipality in the Savinja Statistical Region.
