= Škofce =

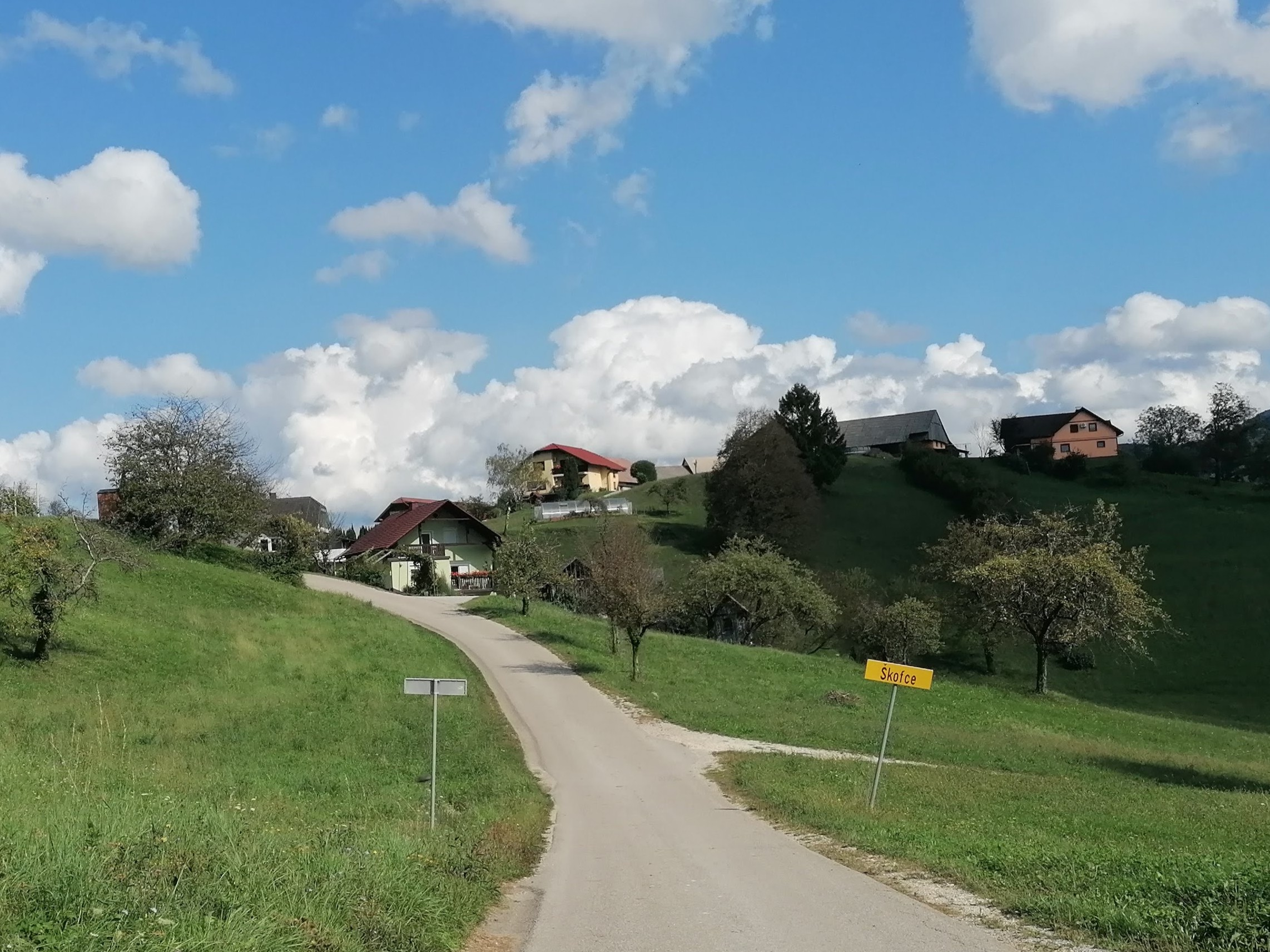

- Location in Slovenia
- Coordinates: 46°6′43.23″N 15°15′3.51″E
- Country: Slovenia
- Traditional region: Styria
- Statistical region: Savinja
- Municipality: Laško

Area
  - Total: 0.83 km^{2} (0.32 sq mi)
- Elevation: 404.3 m (1,326 ft)

Population (2002)
  - Total: 26
- Postal code: 3272

Škofce (pronounced [ˈʃkoːftsɛ]) is a small settlement in the Municipality of Laško in eastern Slovenia. It lies in the hills east of Rimske Toplice. The area is part of the traditional region of Styria. It is now included with the rest of the municipality in the Savinja Statistical Region.
