= Mačkovec, Laško =

Mačkovec
- Location in Slovenia
- Coordinates: 46°9′29.39″N 15°21′10.64″E
- Country: Slovenia
- Traditional region: Styria
- Statistical region: Savinja
- Municipality: Laško

Area
  - Total: 1.53 km^{2} (0.59 sq mi)
- Elevation: 559 m (1,834 ft)

Population (2002)
  - Total: 32
- Postal code: 3271

Mačkovec (pronounced [matʃˈkɔːʋəts] or [matʃˈkoːʋəts]) is a dispersed settlement in the Municipality of Laško in eastern Slovenia. It lies in the hills east of the town of Laško, above Šentrupert. The area is part of the traditional region of Styria. It is now included with the rest of the municipality in the Savinja Statistical Region.
