= Paneče =

- Location in Slovenia
- Coordinates: 46°5′27.81″N 15°16′56.29″E
- Country: Slovenia
- Traditional region: Styria
- Statistical region: Savinja
- Municipality: Laško

Area
  - Total: 6.43 km^{2} (2.48 sq mi)
- Elevation: 469.3 m (1,540 ft)

Population (2002)
  - Total: 114
- Postal code: 3272

Paneče (pronounced [paˈneːtʃɛ]) is a settlement in the Municipality of Laško in eastern Slovenia. It lies in the hills east of Rimske Toplice. Traditionally part of the Styria region, the area is now included with the rest of the municipality in the Savinja Statistical Region.
