= Jagoče =

Jagoče may refer to:

- Jagoče, Montenegro
- Jagoče, Laško, Slovenia
