= Zabrež =

- Location in Slovenia
- Coordinates: 46°7′53.03″N 15°13′48.35″E
- Country: Slovenia
- Traditional region: Styria
- Statistical region: Savinja
- Municipality: Laško

Area
  - Total: 0.7 km^{2} (0.27 sq mi)
- Elevation: 480.6 m (1,577 ft)

Population (2002)
  - Total: 19
- Postal code: 3272

Zabrež (pronounced [ˈzaːbɾɛʃ]) is a small village in the hills east of Rimske Toplice in the Municipality of Laško in eastern Slovenia. The area is part of the traditional region of Styria. It is now included with the rest of the municipality in the Savinja Statistical Region.
