= Marijina Vas =

- Location in Slovenia
- Coordinates: 46°5′26.65″N 15°21′52.84″E
- Country: Slovenia
- Traditional region: Styria
- Statistical region: Savinja
- Municipality: Laško

Area
  - Total: 7.54 km^{2} (2.91 sq mi)
- Elevation: 562.8 m (1,846 ft)

Population (2002)
  - Total: 79
- Postal code: 3273

Marijina Vas (pronounced [maˈɾiːjina ˈʋaːs]; Slovene: Marijina vas) is a settlement in the Municipality of Laško in eastern Slovenia. It lies in the hills east of Rimske Toplice. The area is part of the traditional region of Styria. It is now included with the rest of the municipality in the Savinja Statistical Region.
