= Polana, Laško =

Polana
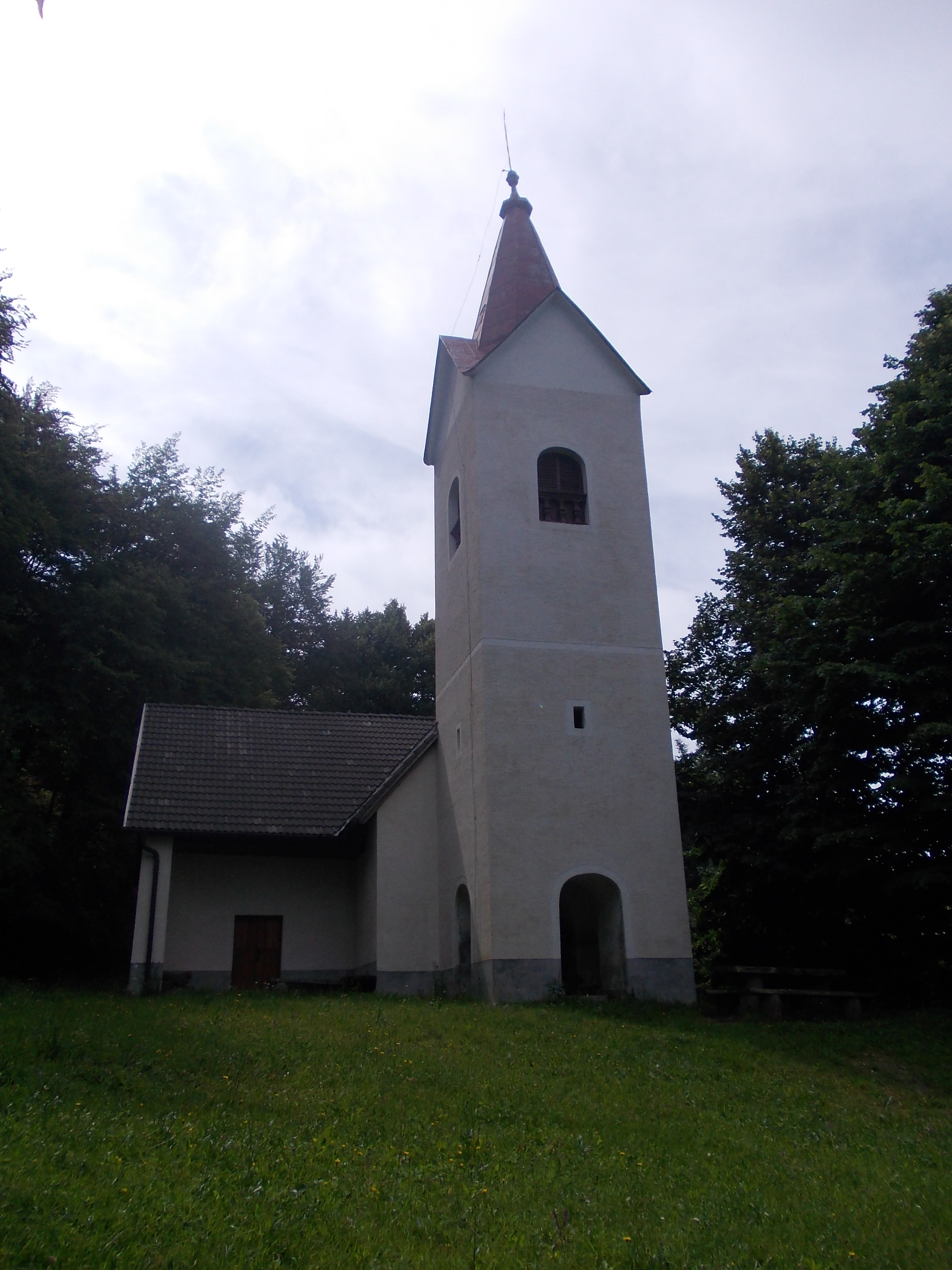
- St. Judoc's Church in Polana, 2018.

- Location in Slovenia
- Coordinates: 46°4′50.44″N 15°17′44.97″E
- Country: Slovenia
- Traditional region: Styria
- Statistical region: Savinja
- Municipality: Laško

Area
  - Total: 7 km^{2} (2.7 sq mi)
- Elevation: 499.7 m (1,639 ft)

Population (2002)
  - Total: 183
- Postal code: 3273

Polana (pronounced [pɔˈlaːna]) is a settlement in the hills east of Zidani Most in the Municipality of Laško in eastern Slovenia. The area is part of the traditional region of Styria. It is now included with the rest of the municipality in the Savinja Statistical Region.

There are two churches near the settlement. Both belong to the Parish of Razbor. A church dedicated to Saint Cantius (Slovene: sveti Kancijan) lies northeast of the village. It dates to the mid-16th century with numerous 18th-century alterations. A church dedicated to Saint Josse (Slovene: sveti Jošt) is built on southern slopes just under the peak of Lisca Hill. It dates to the 17th century.
