= Brstovnica =

- Location in Slovenia
- Coordinates: 46°6′58.99″N 15°13′17.85″E
- Country: Slovenia
- Traditional region: Styria
- Statistical region: Savinja
- Municipality: Laško

Area
  - Total: 0.75 km^{2} (0.29 sq mi)
- Elevation: 276.1 m (906 ft)

Population (2002)
  - Total: 61
- Postal code: 3272

Brstovnica (pronounced [bəɾstɔu̯ˈniːtsa]) is a settlement on the left bank of the Savinja River in the Municipality of Laško in eastern Slovenia. It is part of the traditional region of Styria and is now included with the rest of the municipality in the Savinja Statistical Region.

Archaeological evidence shows that the area has been settled since prehistoric and Roman times.
