= Kladje, Laško =

Kladje
- Location in Slovenia
- Coordinates: 46°8′11.41″N 15°16′49.21″E
- Country: Slovenia
- Traditional region: Styria
- Statistical region: Savinja
- Municipality: Laško

Area
  - Total: 0.63 km^{2} (0.24 sq mi)
- Elevation: 398 m (1,306 ft)

Population (2002)
  - Total: 34
- Postal code: 3270

Kladje (pronounced [ˈklaːdjɛ]) is a small settlement in the Municipality of Laško in eastern Slovenia. It lies in the hills east of Laško itself. The area is part of the traditional region of Styria. It is now included with the rest of the municipality in the Savinja Statistical Region.
