= Selo nad Laškim =

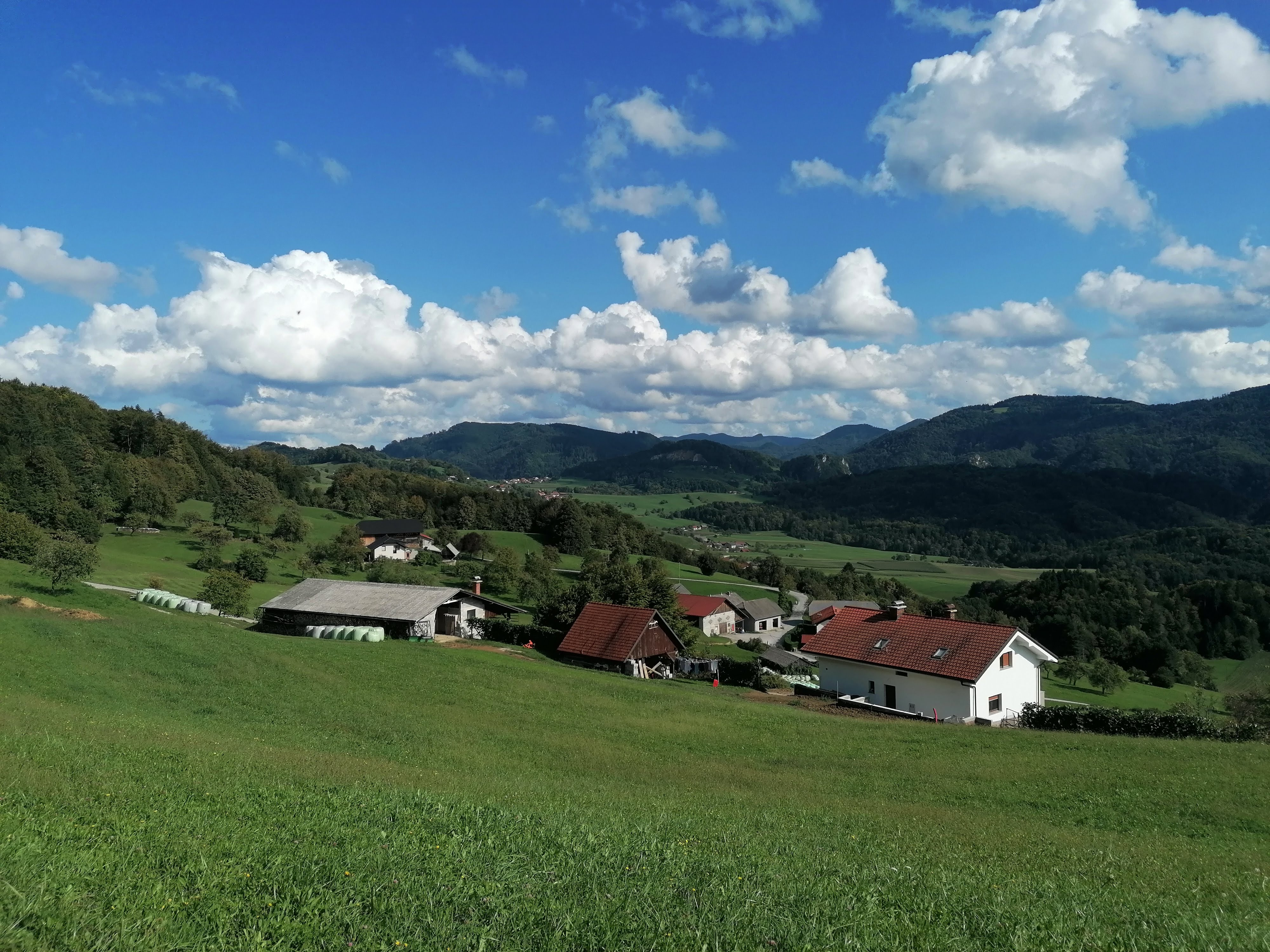

- Location in Slovenia
- Coordinates: 46°7′22.97″N 15°15′45.15″E
- Country: Slovenia
- Traditional region: Styria
- Statistical region: Savinja
- Municipality: Laško

Area
  - Total: 1.34 km^{2} (0.52 sq mi)
- Elevation: 421.8 m (1,384 ft)

Population (2002)
  - Total: 39
- Postal code: 3270

Selo nad Laškim (pronounced [ˈsɛːlɔ nat ˈlaːʃkim]) is a settlement in the Municipality of Laško in eastern Slovenia. It lies in the hills southeast of Laško. The area is part of the traditional region of Styria. It is now included with the rest of the municipality in the Savinja Statistical Region.

== Name ==
The name of the settlement was changed from Selo to Selo nad Laškim in 1953.
