= Padež, Laško =

Padež
- Location in Slovenia
- Coordinates: 46°10′18.49″N 15°16′1.84″E
- Country: Slovenia
- Traditional region: Styria
- Statistical region: Savinja
- Municipality: Laško

Area
  - Total: 1.41 km^{2} (0.54 sq mi)
- Elevation: 636.8 m (2,089 ft)

Population (2002)
  - Total: 52
- Postal code: 3270

Padež (pronounced [ˈpaːdɛʃ]) is a small dispersed settlement in the Municipality of Laško in eastern Slovenia. It lies in the hills northeast of Laško. The area is part of the traditional region of Styria. It is now included with the rest of the municipality in the Savinja Statistical Region.

A small roadside chapel-shrine in the settlement is dedicated to the Virgin Mary and dates to the 19th century.
