= Žigon =

- Location in Slovenia
- Coordinates: 46°7′23.78″N 15°16′55.49″E
- Country: Slovenia
- Traditional region: Styria
- Statistical region: Savinja
- Municipality: Laško

Area
  - Total: 2.04 km^{2} (0.79 sq mi)
- Elevation: 408.5 m (1,340 ft)

Population (2002)
  - Total: 121
- Postal code: 3270

Žigon (pronounced [ˈʒiːɡɔn]) is a village in the Municipality of Laško in eastern Slovenia. It lies in the hills to the southeast of Laško. The area is part of the traditional region of Styria. It is now included with the rest of the municipality in the Savinja Statistical Region.

A small roadside chapel-shrine in the settlement dates to the 19th century.
