= Strmca, Laško =

Strmca
- Location in Slovenia
- Coordinates: 46°8′52.63″N 15°13′46.27″E
- Country: Slovenia
- Traditional region: Styria
- Statistical region: Savinja
- Municipality: Laško

Area
  - Total: 1.97 km^{2} (0.76 sq mi)
- Elevation: 253.2 m (831 ft)

Population (2002)
  - Total: 397
- Postal code: 3270

Strmca (pronounced [ˈstəɾmtsa]) is a settlement on the right bank of the Savinja River in the Municipality of Laško in eastern Slovenia. The area is part of the traditional region of Styria. It is now included with the rest of the municipality in the Savinja Statistical Region.

The local church, built on a small hill in the centre of the settlement, is dedicated to Saint Christopher and belongs to the Parish of Laško. It dates to the 18th century.
