= Sedraž =

- Location in Slovenia
- Coordinates: 46°8′42.3″N 15°10′25.84″E
- Country: Slovenia
- Traditional region: Styria
- Statistical region: Savinja
- Municipality: Laško

Area
  - Total: 1.62 km^{2} (0.63 sq mi)
- Elevation: 422.3 m (1,385 ft)

Population (2002)
  - Total: 170
- Postal code: 3270

Sedraž (pronounced [ˈseːdɾaʃ]) is a village in the Municipality of Laško in eastern Slovenia. It lies north of Rimske Toplice. The area is part of the traditional region of Styria. It is now included with the rest of the municipality in the Savinja Statistical Region.

The parish church in the settlement is dedicated to Saint Gertrude (Slovene: sveta Jedrt) and belongs to the Roman Catholic Diocese of Celje. It was built in the mid 17th century on the site of an earlier church.
