= Mala Breza =

- Location in Slovenia
- Coordinates: 46°9′44.21″N 15°19′48.22″E
- Country: Slovenia
- Traditional region: Styria
- Statistical region: Savinja
- Municipality: Laško

Area
  - Total: 3.79 km^{2} (1.46 sq mi)
- Elevation: 505.4 m (1,658 ft)

Population (2002)
  - Total: 217
- Postal code: 3271

Mala Breza (pronounced [ˈmaːla ˈbɾeːza]) is a settlement in the Municipality of Laško in eastern Slovenia. It lies in the hills east of Laško. The area is part of the traditional region of Styria. It is now included with the rest of the municipality in the Savinja Statistical Region.
