= Alfred Jensen (slavist) =

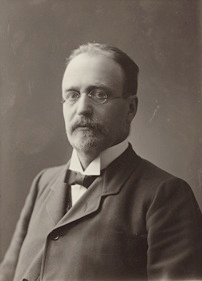
Alfred Jensen.

Alfred Anton Jensen (30 September 1859 — 15 September 1921) was a Swedish historian, Slavist, writer, poet, and translator.

== Biography ==
Alfred Jensen was born in Hälsingtuna, Gävleborg County, and studied at Uppsala University. From 1884 to 1887, he worked for one of Sweden's largest newspapers — Göteborgs Handels-och Sjöfartstidning. He visited Germany, Serbia, Bulgaria and other Slavic countries. In 1901 he received a position at the Nobel Institute of the Swedish Academy at Stockholm. In 1907, he received an honorary degree in philosophy from the Uppsala University.

Jensen became one of the prominent translators of Slavic literature into Swedish. He translated Gogol, Turgenev, Pushkin, Lermontov, Shevchenko, Kotsyubynsky and Mickiewicz. He also contributed literary critique on Russian, Ukrainian, Bulgarian, Slovenian and Czech literature. His historic works included Russian cultural history, Mazepa and others. In 1911, he became a member of the Shevchenko Scientific Society.

Jensen died in Vienna on 15 September 1921, and is buried at the Inzersdorf cemetery.

== See also ==
- Anton Aškerc

== Sources ==
- Alfred Jensen. Mazepa. Ukrayinsky pysmennyk. Kiev. 1992. ISBN 5-333-01141-9
