= Brodnice =

- Location in Slovenia
- Coordinates: 46°6′57.65″N 15°16′11.11″E
- Country: Slovenia
- Traditional region: Styria
- Statistical region: Savinja
- Municipality: Laško

Area
  - Total: 1.04 km^{2} (0.40 sq mi)
- Elevation: 296.6 m (973 ft)

Population (2002)
  - Total: 70
- Postal code: 3272

Brodnice (pronounced [bɾɔˈdniːtsɛ]) is a settlement in the Municipality of Laško in eastern Slovenia. The area is part of the traditional region of Styria. It is now included with the rest of the municipality in the Savinja Statistical Region.
