= Tovsto =

- Location in Slovenia
- Coordinates: 46°10′7.66″N 15°14′44.86″E
- Country: Slovenia
- Traditional region: Styria
- Statistical region: Savinja
- Municipality: Laško

Area
  - Total: 1.97 km^{2} (0.76 sq mi)
- Elevation: 322.8 m (1,059 ft)

Population (2002)
  - Total: 155
- Postal code: 3270

Tovsto (pronounced [ˈtoːu̯stɔ]) is a settlement in the Municipality of Laško in eastern Slovenia. It lies on the north side of Hum Hill, above the left bank of the Savinja River, just north of Laško. The area is part of the traditional region of Styria. It is now included with the rest of the municipality in the Savinja Statistical Region.

A small chapel-shrine, built at the source of a small stream in the settlement, dates to the 19th century.
