= Plazovje =

- Location in Slovenia
- Coordinates: 46°8′7.08″N 15°12′43.18″E
- Country: Slovenia
- Traditional region: Styria
- Statistical region: Savinja
- Municipality: Laško

Area
  - Total: 1.05 km^{2} (0.41 sq mi)
- Elevation: 405.4 m (1,330 ft)

Population (2002)
  - Total: 20
- Postal code: 3270

Plazovje (pronounced [plaˈzoːu̯jɛ]) is a small settlement in the hills above the left bank of the Savinja River in the Municipality of Laško in eastern Slovenia. The area is part of the traditional region of Styria. It is now included with the rest of the municipality in the Savinja Statistical Region.
