= Doblatina =

- Location in Slovenia
- Coordinates: 46°11′4.78″N 15°16′13.72″E
- Country: Slovenia
- Traditional region: Styria
- Statistical region: Savinja
- Municipality: Laško

Area
  - Total: 2.09 km^{2} (0.81 sq mi)
- Elevation: 576 m (1,890 ft)

Population (2002)
  - Total: 58
- Postal code: 3270

Doblatina (pronounced [dɔblaˈtiːna]) is a settlement in the Municipality of Laško in eastern Slovenia. It lies in the hills above the left bank of the Savinja River. The area is part of the traditional region of Styria. It is now included with the rest of the municipality in the Savinja Statistical Region.
