= Konc =

- Location in Slovenia
- Coordinates: 46°7′38.12″N 15°13′53.41″E
- Country: Slovenia
- Traditional region: Styria
- Statistical region: Savinja
- Municipality: Laško

Area
  - Total: 0.88 km^{2} (0.34 sq mi)
- Elevation: 541.6 m (1,777 ft)

Population (2002)
  - Total: 25
- Postal code: 3272

Konc (pronounced [ˈkɔːnts] or [ˈkoːnts]) is a settlement in the Municipality of Laško in eastern Slovenia. It lies in the hills south of Laško. The area is part of the traditional region of Styria. It is now included with the rest of the municipality in the Savinja Statistical Region.
