= Gabrno =

- Location in Slovenia
- Coordinates: 46°9′10.53″N 15°15′38.67″E
- Country: Slovenia
- Traditional region: Styria
- Statistical region: Savinja
- Municipality: Laško

Area
  - Total: 0.67 km^{2} (0.26 sq mi)
- Elevation: 469.2 m (1,539 ft)

Population (2002)
  - Total: 53
- Postal code: 3270

Gabrno (pronounced [ˈɡaːbəɾnɔ]) is a settlement in the hills immediately east of Laško in east-central Slovenia. The area is part of the traditional region of Styria. It is now included with the rest of the municipality in the Savinja Statistical Region.
