= Modrič =

Modrič may refer to:

- Modrič, Struga, a village in southwestern Macedonia
- Modrič, Slovenska Bistrica, a village in northeastern Slovenia
- Modrič, Laško, a small settlement in eastern Slovenia
- Modrič, Čapljina, a village near Čapljina, Bosnia and Herzegovina
