= Šmihel, Laško =

Šmihel
- Location in Slovenia
- Coordinates: 46°9′25.72″N 15°13′20.31″E
- Country: Slovenia
- Traditional region: Styria
- Statistical region: Savinja
- Municipality: Laško

Area
  - Total: 0.62 km^{2} (0.24 sq mi)
- Elevation: 428 m (1,404 ft)

Population (2002)
  - Total: 56
- Postal code: 3270

Šmihel (pronounced [ʃmiˈxeːu̯]) is a settlement in the Municipality of Laško in eastern Slovenia. It lies on a hill above the right bank of the Savinja River, just west of Laško. The area is part of the traditional region of Styria. It is now included with the rest of the municipality in the Savinja Statistical Region.

The local church, from which the settlement gets its name, is dedicated to Saint Michael and belongs to the Parish of Laško. It is a pilgrimage church with a double belfry built between 1637 and 1641. Four of an original seven mid-17th century chapel-shrines representing the Stations of the Cross still survive along the road leading up the hill to the church.
