= Tevče, Laško =

Tevče
- Location in Slovenia
- Coordinates: 46°8′42.77″N 15°17′10.34″E
- Country: Slovenia
- Traditional region: Styria
- Statistical region: Savinja
- Municipality: Laško

Area
  - Total: 1.41 km^{2} (0.54 sq mi)
- Elevation: 306.9 m (1,007 ft)

Population (2002)
  - Total: 195
- Postal code: 3270

Tevče (pronounced [ˈteːu̯tʃɛ] or [ˈtɛːu̯tʃɛ]) is a settlement in the Municipality of Laško in eastern Slovenia. It lies in the valley of Lahomnica Creek, a minor left tributary of the Savinja River. The area is part of the traditional region of Styria. It is now included with the rest of the municipality in the Savinja Statistical Region.
