= Stopce =

- Location in Slovenia
- Coordinates: 46°8′5.73″N 15°15′47.21″E
- Country: Slovenia
- Traditional region: Styria
- Statistical region: Savinja
- Municipality: Laško

Area
  - Total: 0.86 km^{2} (0.33 sq mi)
- Elevation: 328.6 m (1,078 ft)

Population (2002)
  - Total: 47
- Postal code: 3270

Stopce (pronounced [ˈstoːptsɛ]) is a small village in the Municipality of Laško in eastern Slovenia. It lies in hills southeast of Laško. The area is part of the traditional region of Styria. It is now included with the rest of the municipality in the Savinja Statistical Region.

Two small roadside chapel-shrines in the settlement both date to the 19th century.
