= Municipality of Laško =

Municipality of Slovenia

Municipality of Laško Občina Laško
- Municipality
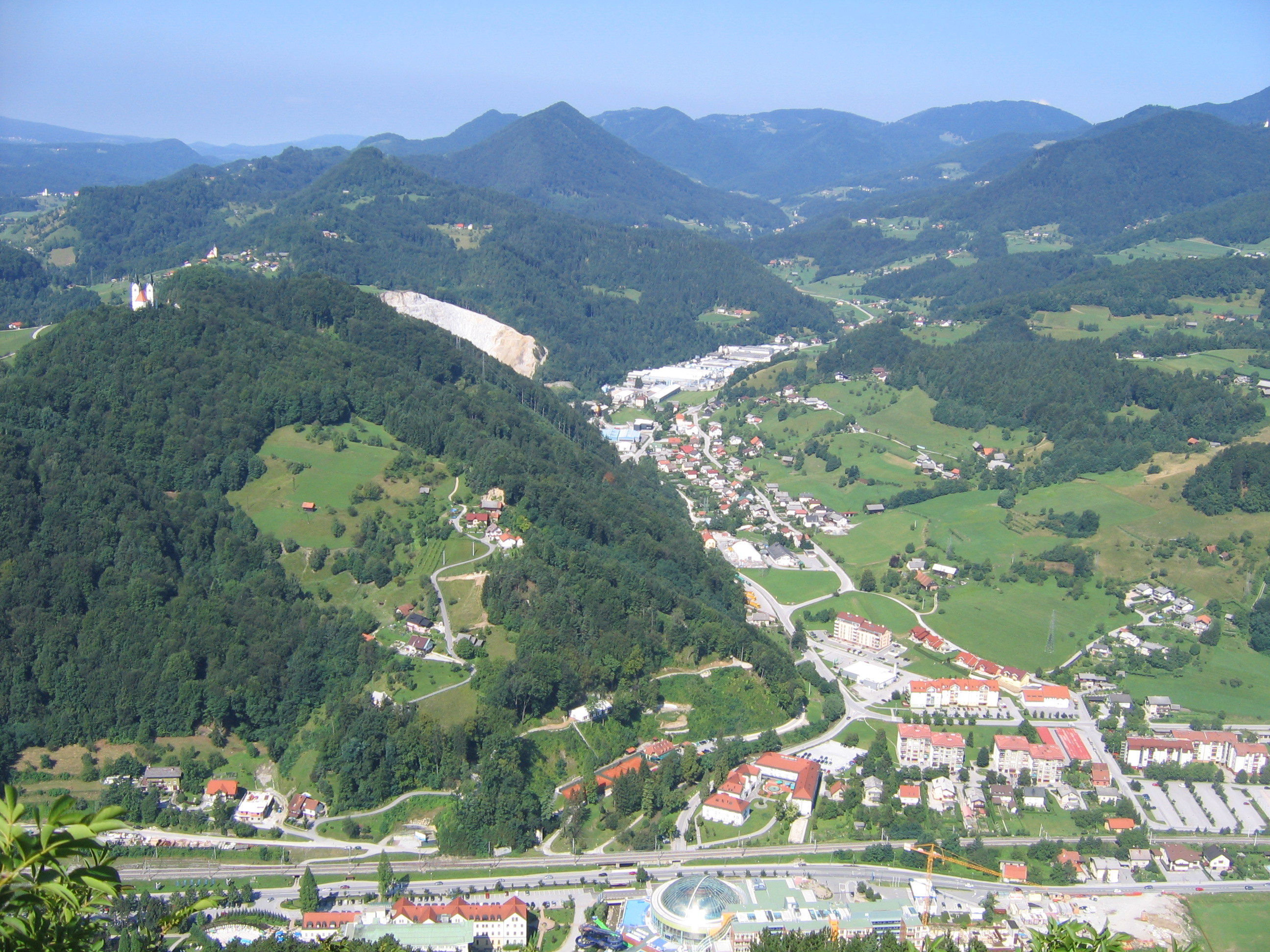

- Coat of arms

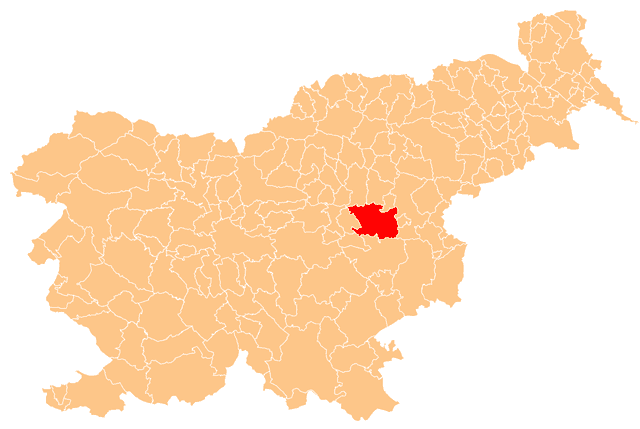
- Location of the Municipality of Laško in Slovenia
- Coordinates: 46°09′N 15°14′E
- Country: Slovenia

Government
  - Mayor: Marko Šantej (Mlada moč občine Laško)

Area
  - Total: 197.5 km^{2} (76.3 sq mi)

Population (2002)
  - Total: 13,730
  - Density: 69.52/km^{2} (180.1/sq mi)
- Time zone: UTC+01 (CET)
  - Summer (DST): UTC+02 (CEST)
- Website: www.lasko.si

The Municipality of Laško (pronounced [ˈlaːʃkɔ]; Slovene: Občina Laško) is a municipality in eastern Slovenia. The seat of the municipality is the town of Laško. The area is part of the traditional region of Styria. The municipality is now included in the Savinja Statistical Region.

== Settlements ==
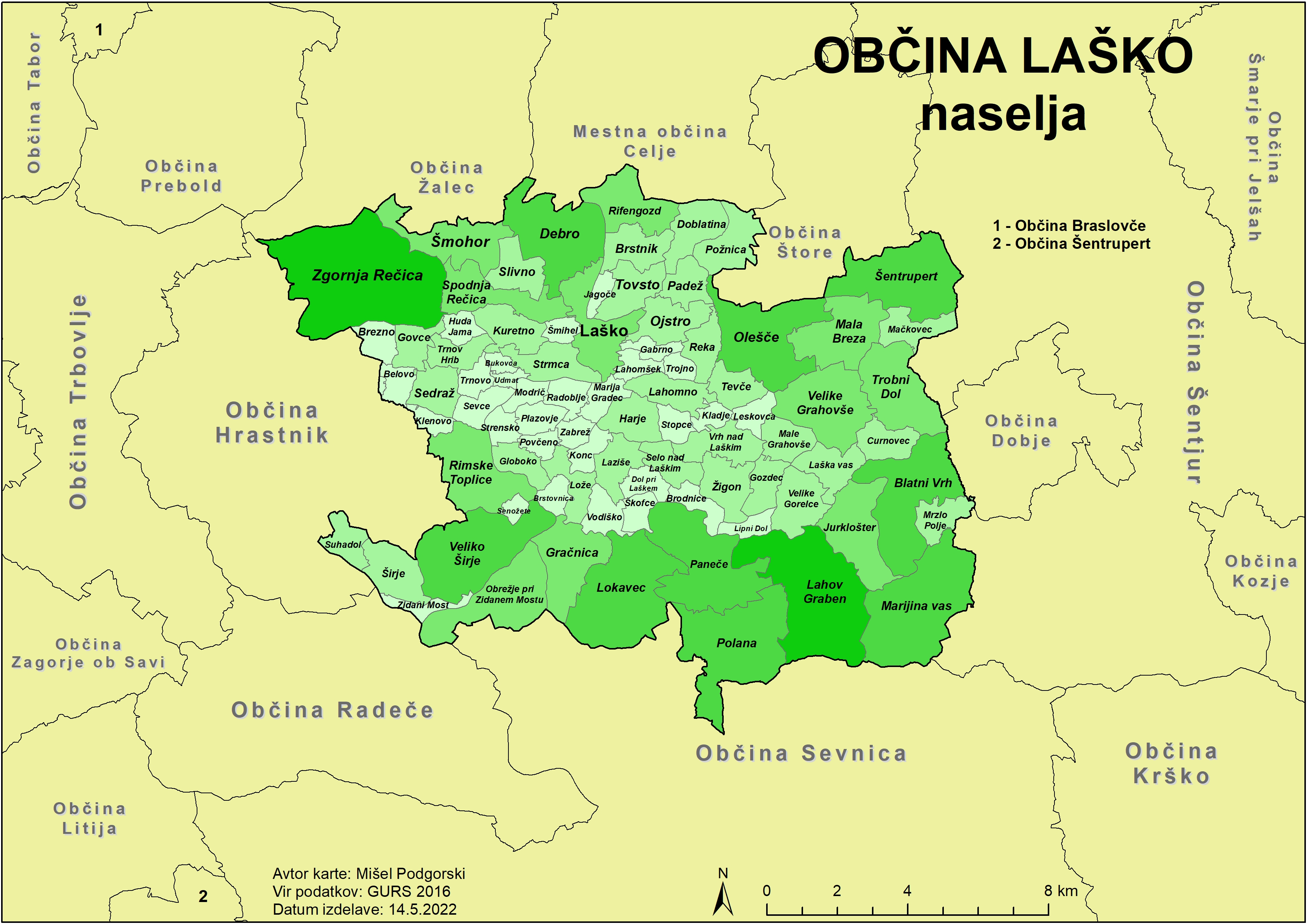
Villages in the municipality

In addition to the municipal seat of Laško, the municipality also includes the following settlements:

- Belovo
- Blatni Vrh
- Brezno
- Brodnice
- Brstnik
- Brstovnica
- Bukovca
- Curnovec
- Debro
- Doblatina
- Dol pri Laškem
- Gabrno
- Globoko
- Govce
- Gozdec
- Gračnica
- Harje
- Huda Jama
- Jagoče
- Jurklošter
- Kladje
- Klenovo
- Konc
- Kuretno
- Lahomno
- Lahomšek
- Lahov Graben
- Laška Vas
- Laziše
- Leskovca
- Lipni Dol
- Lokavec
- Lože
- Mačkovec
- Mala Breza
- Male Grahovše
- Marija Gradec
- Marijina Vas
- Modrič
- Mrzlo Polje
- Obrežje pri Zidanem Mostu
- Ojstro
- Olešče
- Padež
- Paneče
- Plazovje
- Polana
- Povčeno
- Požnica
- Radoblje
- Reka
- Rifengozd
- Rimske Toplice
- Sedraž
- Selo nad Laškim
- Senožete
- Šentrupert
- Sevce
- Širje
- Škofce
- Slivno
- Šmihel
- Šmohor
- Spodnja Rečica
- Stopce
- Strensko
- Strmca
- Suhadol
- Tevče
- Tovsto
- Trnov Hrib
- Trnovo
- Trobni Dol
- Trojno
- Udmat
- Velike Gorelce
- Velike Grahovše
- Veliko Širje
- Vodiško
- Vrh nad Laškim
- Zabrež
- Zgornja Rečica
- Zidani Most
- Žigon
