= Debro =

- Location in Slovenia
- Coordinates: 46°11′4.09″N 15°14′12″E
- Country: Slovenia
- Traditional region: Styria
- Statistical region: Savinja
- Municipality: Laško

Area
  - Total: 5.4 km^{2} (2.1 sq mi)
- Elevation: 275.2 m (903 ft)

Population (2002)
  - Total: 158
- Postal code: 3270

Debro (pronounced [ˈdɛːbɾɔ]) is a settlement in the hills above the right bank of the Savinja River River in the Municipality of Laško in eastern Slovenia. The area is part of the traditional region of Styria. It is now included with the rest of the municipality in the Savinja Statistical Region.
