= Trojno =

- Location in Slovenia
- Coordinates: 46°9′0.45″N 15°15′55.87″E
- Country: Slovenia
- Traditional region: Styria
- Statistical region: Savinja
- Municipality: Laško

Area
  - Total: 0.58 km^{2} (0.22 sq mi)
- Elevation: 464.5 m (1,524 ft)

Population (2002)
  - Total: 49
- Postal code: 3270

Trojno (pronounced [ˈtɾoːi̯nɔ]) is a settlement in the hills east of Laško in eastern Slovenia. The area is part of the traditional region of Styria. It is now included with the rest of the municipality in the Savinja Statistical Region.
