= Požnica =

- Location in Slovenia
- Coordinates: 46°11′5″N 15°17′12.06″E
- Country: Slovenia
- Traditional region: Styria
- Statistical region: Savinja
- Municipality: Laško

Area
  - Total: 2.25 km^{2} (0.87 sq mi)
- Elevation: 605.5 m (1,987 ft)

Population (2002)
  - Total: 66
- Postal code: 3270

Požnica (pronounced [ˈpoːʒnitsa]) is a small settlement in the hills northeast of Laško in eastern Slovenia. The area is part of the traditional region of Styria. It is now included with the rest of the Municipality of Laško in the Savinja Statistical Region.
