= Curnovec, Laško =

Curnovec
- Location in Slovenia
- Coordinates: 46°7′41.01″N 15°20′28.01″E
- Country: Slovenia
- Traditional region: Styria
- Statistical region: Savinja
- Municipality: Laško

Area
  - Total: 1.49 km^{2} (0.58 sq mi)
- Elevation: 485.4 m (1,593 ft)

Population (2002)
  - Total: 38
- Postal code: 3271

Curnovec (pronounced [ˈtsuːɾnɔʋəts]) is a settlement in the Municipality of Laško in eastern Slovenia. The area is part of the traditional region of Styria. It is now included with the rest of the municipality in the Savinja Statistical Region.
