= Belovo, Laško =

Belovo
- Location in Slovenia
- Coordinates: 46°8′39.77″N 15°9′44.36″E
- Country: Slovenia
- Traditional region: Styria
- Statistical region: Savinja
- Municipality: Laško

Area
  - Total: 0.88 km^{2} (0.34 sq mi)
- Elevation: 395.4 m (1,297 ft)

Population (2002)
  - Total: 186
- Postal code: 3270

Belovo (pronounced [ˈbeːlɔʋɔ]) is a settlement in the Municipality of Laško in eastern Slovenia. It lies just off the main road between Hrastnik and Rimske Toplice. The area is part of the traditional region of Styria. It is now included with the rest of the municipality in the Savinja Statistical Region.
