= Olešče =

Olešče Sveti Peter pri Jurkloštru (until 1959), Šempeter (locally)
- Location in Slovenia
- Coordinates: 46°9′14.66″N 15°18′21.35″E
- Country: Slovenia
- Traditional region: Styria
- Statistical region: Savinja
- Municipality: Laško

Area
  - Total: 5.61 km^{2} (2.17 sq mi)
- Elevation: 406.1 m (1,332 ft)

Population (2002)
  - Total: 253
- Postal code: 3270

Olešče (pronounced [ɔˈleːʃtʃɛ]) is a settlement in the Municipality of Laško in eastern Slovenia. It lies in the hills east of Laško. The area is part of the traditional region of Styria. It is now included with the rest of the municipality in the Savinja Statistical Region.

== Name ==
The name of the settlement was changed from Sveti Peter pri Jurkloštru (literally, 'Saint Peter near Jurklošter') to Olešče in 1959. The name was changed on the basis of the 1948 Law on Names of Settlements and Designations of Squares, Streets, and Buildings as part of efforts by Slovenia's postwar communist government to remove religious elements from toponyms. The settlement is still locally known as Šempeter. The name Olešče was first attested in 1328 as Beleczicz (and as Wellesitsch in 1382 and Beleschicz in 1423). The name Olešče is derived from a plural demonym, *Velešiťane, based on a patronymic derived from the hypocorism *Velešь. Before Olešče became the name of the entire settlement, the name used to refer to one of the hamlets in the settlement.

== Mass grave ==
Olešče is the site of a mass grave from the end of the Second World War. The Olešče Mass Grave (Slovene: Grobišče Olešče) is located about 300 meters (980 ft) north of the neighboring village of Reka. It measures 3 by 1.5 meters (9.8 by 4.9 ft) and lies between two apple trees, and it contains the remains of about 14 Ustaša soldiers that were shot in May 1945.

== Church ==
The local church, built on a small hill south of the settlement core, is dedicated to Saint Peter and belongs to the Parish of Sveti Rupert. It is a Gothic building that was restyled in the Baroque in the 17th century.
