= Lahomšek =

- Location in Slovenia
- Coordinates: 46°8′52.48″N 15°14′56.18″E
- Country: Slovenia
- Traditional region: Styria
- Statistical region: Savinja
- Municipality: Laško

Area
  - Total: 0.79 km^{2} (0.31 sq mi)
- Elevation: 327.7 m (1,075 ft)

Population (2002)
  - Total: 111
- Postal code: 3270

Lahomšek (pronounced [laˈxoːmʃək]) is a settlement in the hills immediately east of Laško in eastern Slovenia. The area is part of the traditional region of Styria. It is now included with the rest of the Municipality of Laško in the Savinja Statistical Region.
