= Radoblje =

- Location in Slovenia
- Coordinates: 46°8′37.75″N 15°13′38.29″E
- Country: Slovenia
- Traditional region: Styria
- Statistical region: Savinja
- Municipality: Laško

Area
  - Total: 1.04 km^{2} (0.40 sq mi)
- Elevation: 239 m (784 ft)

Population (2002)
  - Total: 100
- Postal code: 3270

Radoblje (pronounced [ˈɾaːdɔbljɛ]) is a settlement on the left bank of the Savinja River in the Municipality of Laško in eastern Slovenia. The railway line from Zidani Most to Celje runs through the settlement. The area is part of the traditional region of Styria. It is now included with the rest of the municipality in the Savinja Statistical Region.
