= Lipni Dol =

- Location in Slovenia
- Coordinates: 46°6′31.18″N 15°17′45.51″E
- Country: Slovenia
- Traditional region: Styria
- Statistical region: Savinja
- Municipality: Laško

Area
  - Total: 0.75 km^{2} (0.29 sq mi)
- Elevation: 349.4 m (1,146 ft)

Population (2002)
  - Total: 42
- Postal code: 3273

Lipni Dol (pronounced [ˈliːpni ˈdoːl] or [ˈliːpni ˈdoːu̯]) is a settlement in the Municipality of Laško in eastern Slovenia. It lies in the valley of a left tributary of the Savinja River, southeast of the town of Laško. The area is part of the traditional region of Styria. It is now included with the rest of the municipality in the Savinja Statistical Region.
