= Rifengozd =

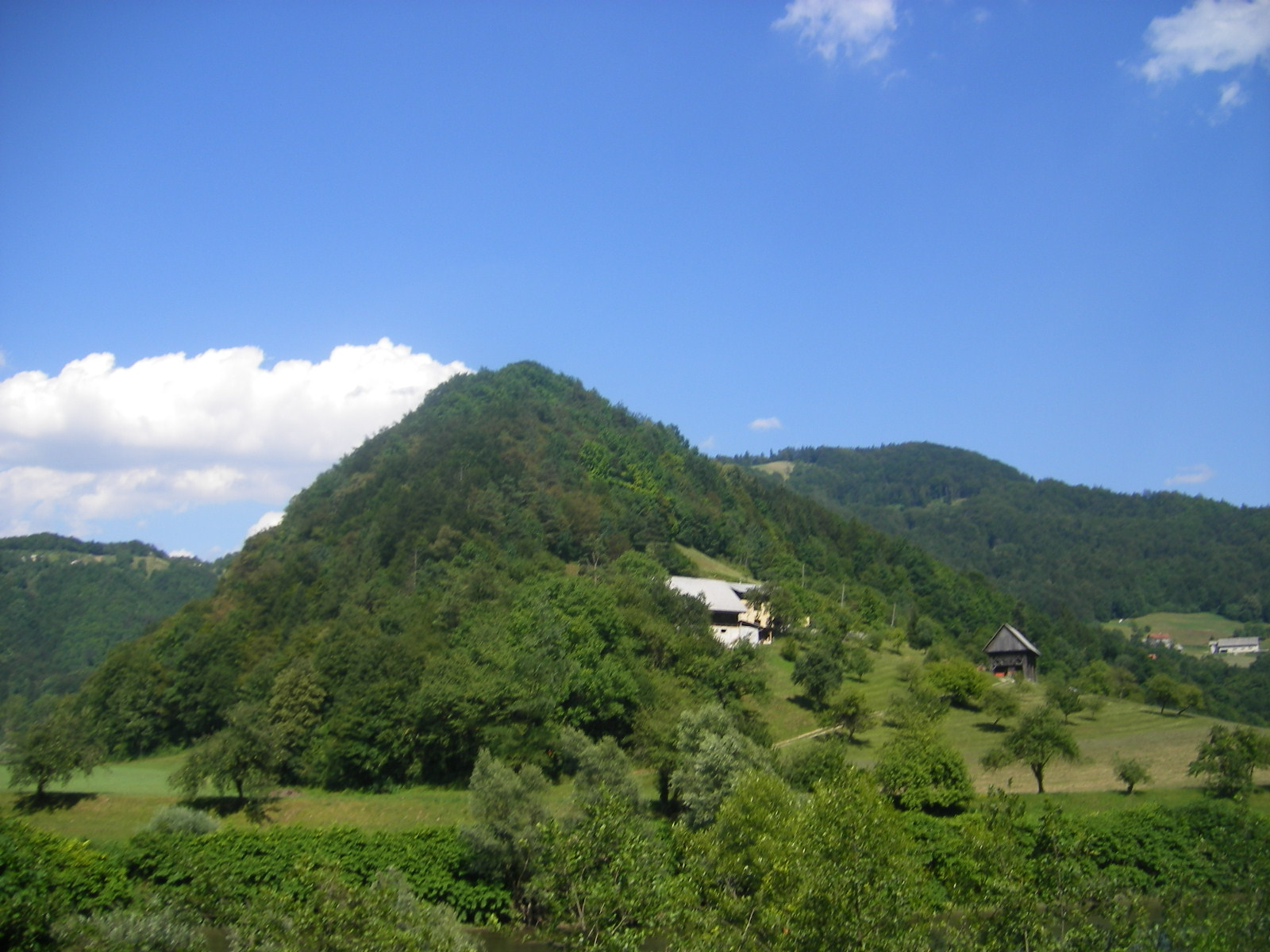

- Location in Slovenia
- Coordinates: 46°11′33.85″N 15°14′30.32″E
- Country: Slovenia
- Traditional region: Styria
- Statistical region: Savinja
- Municipality: Laško

Area
  - Total: 2.93 km^{2} (1.13 sq mi)
- Elevation: 338.4 m (1,110 ft)

Population (2002)
  - Total: 166
- Postal code: 3270

Rifengozd (pronounced [ˈɾiːfɛŋɡɔst]) is a settlement in the Municipality of Laško in eastern Slovenia. It lies on the left bank of the Savinja River, halfway between Celje and Laško. The area is part of the traditional region of Lower Styria. It is now included with the rest of the municipality in the Savinja Statistical Region.
