= Udmat =

- Location in Slovenia
- Coordinates: 46°8′43.1″N 15°12′10.7″E
- Country: Slovenia
- Traditional region: Styria
- Statistical region: Savinja
- Municipality: Laško

Area
  - Total: 0.35 km^{2} (0.14 sq mi)
- Elevation: 266 m (873 ft)

Population (2002)
  - Total: 44
- Postal code: 3270

Udmat (pronounced [ˈuːdmat]) is a small settlement in the Municipality of Laško in eastern Slovenia. It lies on the right bank of the Savinja River. The area is part of the traditional region of Styria. It is now included with the rest of the municipality in the Savinja Statistical Region.
