= Velike Grahovše =

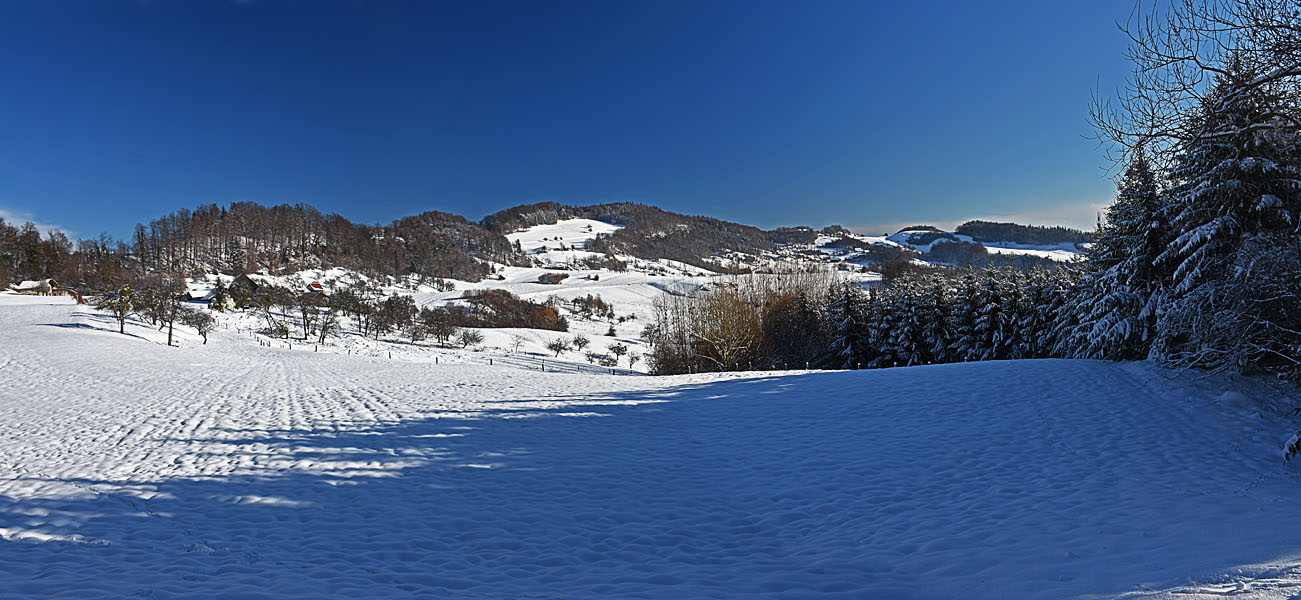

- Location in Slovenia
- Coordinates: 46°8′14.56″N 15°19′22.52″E
- Country: Slovenia
- Traditional region: Styria
- Statistical region: Savinja
- Municipality: Laško

Area
  - Total: 4.56 km^{2} (1.76 sq mi)
- Elevation: 557.5 m (1,829 ft)

Population (2002)
  - Total: 148
- Postal code: 3270

Velike Grahovše (pronounced [ˈʋeːlikɛ ˈɡɾaːxɔu̯ʃɛ]) is a settlement in the Municipality of Laško in eastern Slovenia. It is made up of a number of smaller hamlets: Trate, Leše, Loke, Torog, Suho Dobje, and Velike Grahovše. The area is part of the traditional region of Styria. It is now included with the rest of the municipality in the Savinja Statistical Region.
