= Vrh nad Laškim =

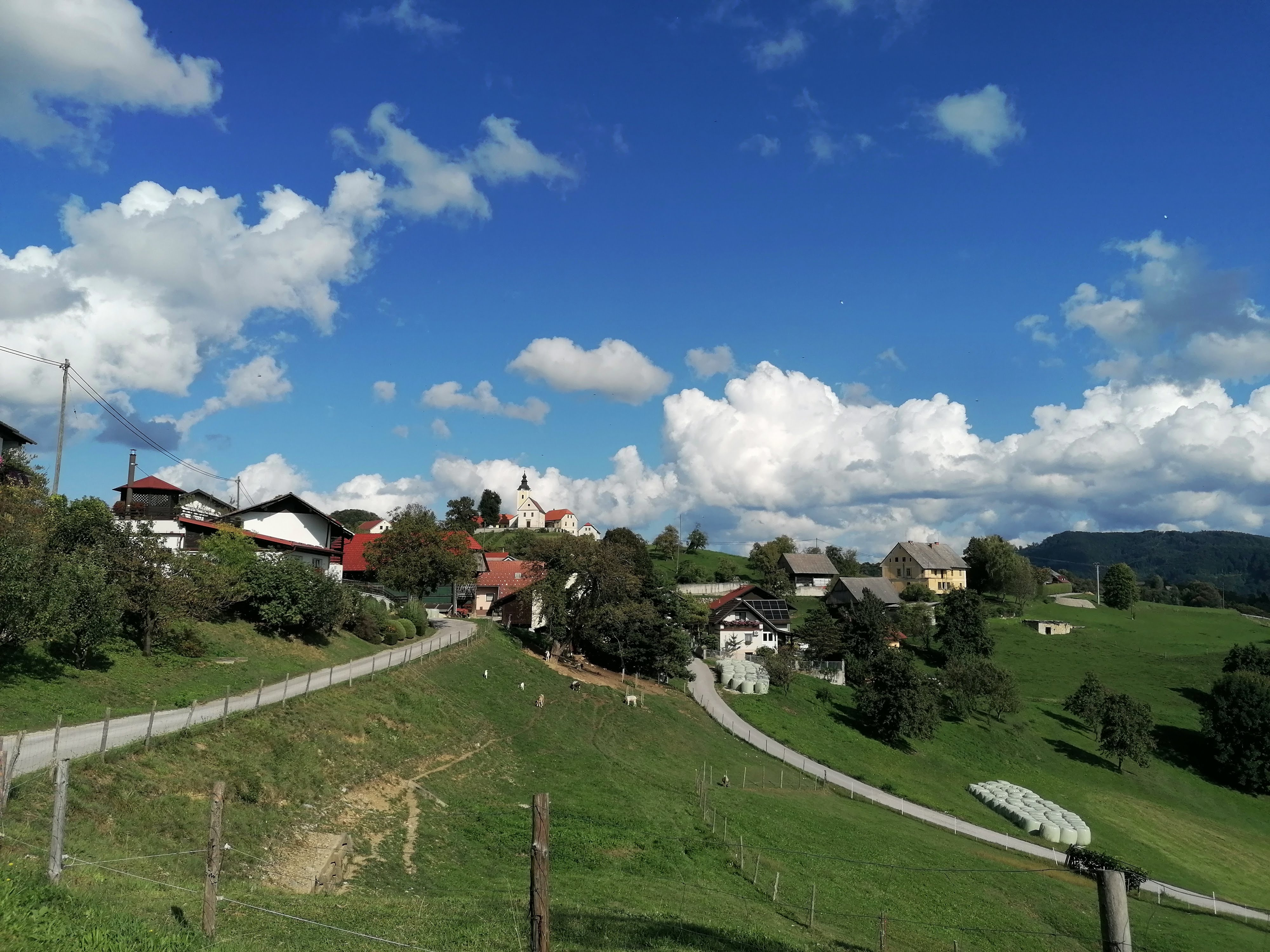

- Location in Slovenia
- Coordinates: 46°7′43.17″N 15°17′12.36″E
- Country: Slovenia
- Traditional region: Styria
- Statistical region: Savinja
- Municipality: Laško

Area
  - Total: 2.05 km^{2} (0.79 sq mi)
- Elevation: 533 m (1,749 ft)

Population (2002)
  - Total: 137
- Postal code: 3270

Vrh nad Laškim (pronounced [ˈʋəɾx nad ˈlaːʃkim]) is a settlement in the Municipality of Laško in eastern Slovenia. It lies in the hills southeast of Laško. The area is part of the traditional region of Styria. It is now included with the rest of the municipality in the Savinja Statistical Region.

== Name ==
The name of the settlement was changed from Vrh to Vrh nad Laškim in 1953.

== Church ==
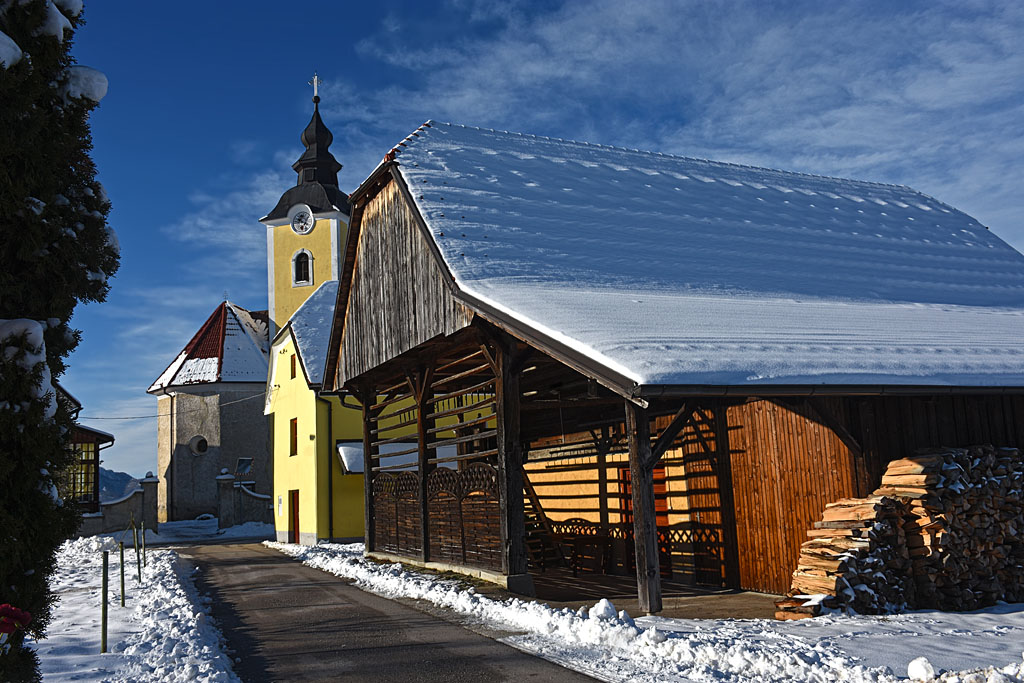
Saint Leonard's Church

The parish church in the settlement is dedicated to Saint Leonard and belongs to the Roman Catholic Diocese of Celje. It was built in 1738 and extended in the 19th century.
