= Ojstro, Laško =

Ojstro
- Location in Slovenia
- Coordinates: 46°9′38.32″N 15°16′6.77″E
- Country: Slovenia
- Traditional region: Styria
- Statistical region: Savinja
- Municipality: Laško

Area
  - Total: 2.04 km^{2} (0.79 sq mi)
- Elevation: 492 m (1,614 ft)

Population (2002)
  - Total: 117
- Postal code: 3270

Ojstro (pronounced [ˈoːi̯strɔ]) is a settlement in the Municipality of Laško in eastern Slovenia. It lies in hills east of Laško. The area is part of the traditional region of Styria. It is now included with the rest of the municipality in the Savinja Statistical Region.

A small chapel-shrine in the settlement dates to the 19th century.
