= Govce =

- Location in Slovenia
- Coordinates: 46°9′19.25″N 15°10′7.32″E
- Country: Slovenia
- Traditional region: Styria
- Statistical region: Savinja
- Municipality: Laško

Area
  - Total: 1.28 km^{2} (0.49 sq mi)
- Elevation: 550.7 m (1,807 ft)

Population (2002)
  - Total: 11
- Postal code: 3270

Govce (pronounced [ˈɡoːu̯tsɛ]) is a small settlement in the Municipality of Laško in eastern Slovenia. It lies in the hills north of the main road from Laško to Hrastnik. The area is part of the traditional region of Styria. It is now included with the rest of the municipality in the Savinja Statistical Region.
