= Bukovca =

- Location in Slovenia
- Coordinates: 46°8′58.33″N 15°12′3.77″E
- Country: Slovenia
- Traditional region: Styria
- Statistical region: Savinja
- Municipality: Laško

Area
  - Total: 0.37 km^{2} (0.14 sq mi)
- Elevation: 384.1 m (1,260 ft)

Population (2002)
  - Total: 30
- Postal code: 3270

Bukovca (pronounced [ˈbuːkɔu̯tsa]) is a small settlement in the Municipality of Laško in eastern Slovenia. It lies just above the right bank of the Savinja River west of the town of Laško. The area is part of the traditional region of Styria. It is now included with the rest of the municipality in the Savinja Statistical Region.
