= Šmohor =

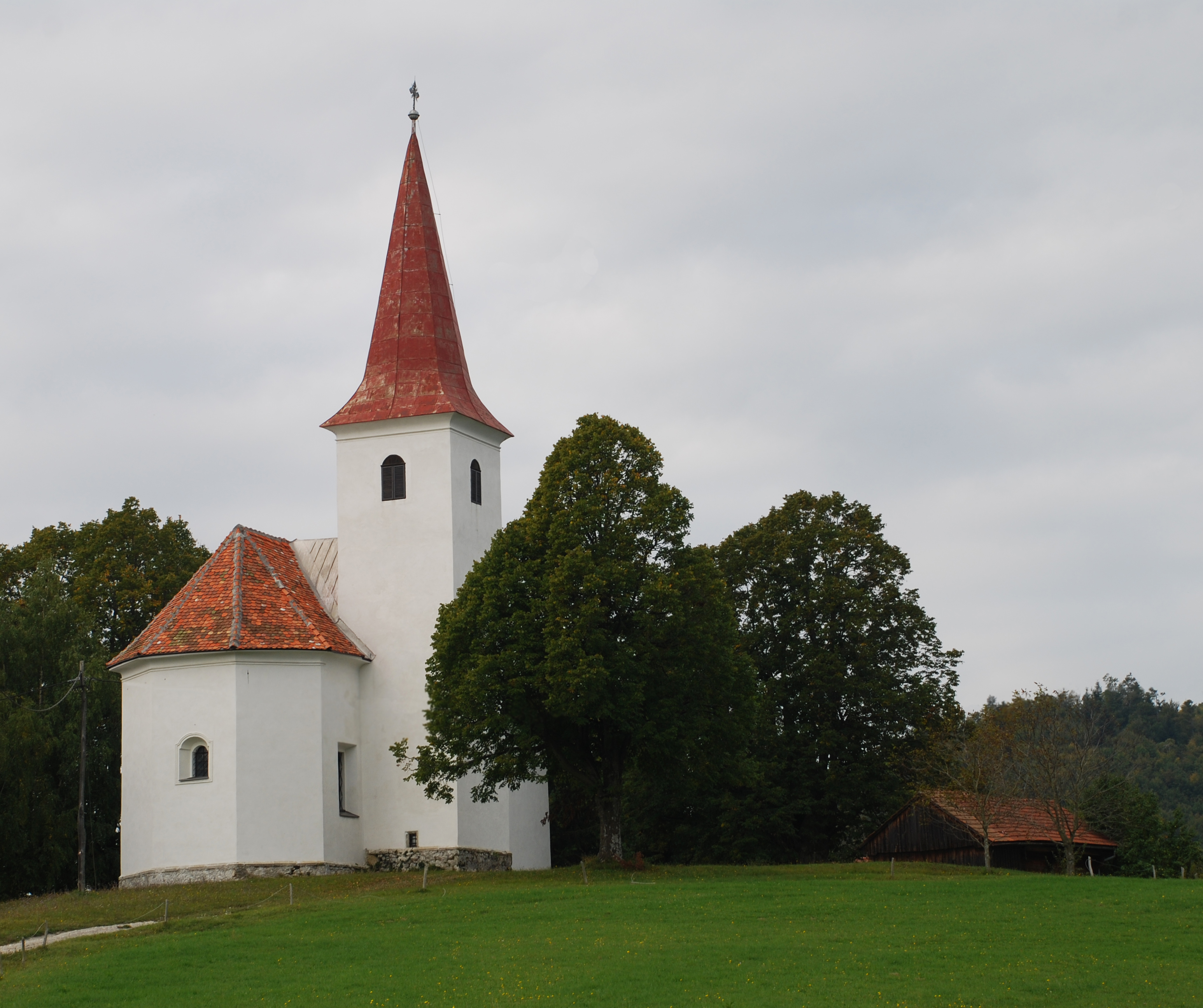

- Location in Slovenia
- Coordinates: 46°10′56.04″N 15°10′45.86″E
- Country: Slovenia
- Traditional region: Styria
- Statistical region: Savinja
- Municipality: Laško

Area
  - Total: 3.39 km^{2} (1.31 sq mi)
- Elevation: 776.2 m (2,547 ft)

Population (2002)
  - Total: 13
- Postal code: 3270

Šmohor (pronounced [ˈʃmɔːxɔɾ]) is a settlement in the Municipality of Laško in eastern Slovenia. It lies in the hills northwest of Laško. The area is part of the traditional region of Styria. It is now included with the rest of the municipality in the Savinja Statistical Region.

The local church, from which the settlement gets its name, is dedicated to Saint Hermagoras (Slovene: sveti Mohor) and belongs to the Parish of Laško. It was first mentioned in written documents dating to 1421.
