= Gozdec =

- Location in Slovenia
- Coordinates: 46°7′19.43″N 15°17′50.43″E
- Country: Slovenia
- Traditional region: Styria
- Statistical region: Savinja
- Municipality: Laško

Area
  - Total: 1.33 km^{2} (0.51 sq mi)
- Elevation: 473.9 m (1,555 ft)

Population (2002)
  - Total: 52
- Postal code: 3270

Gozdec (pronounced [ˈɡoːzdəts] or [ɡɔˈzdəts]) is a settlement in the hills southeast of Laško in eastern Slovenia. The area is part of the traditional region of Styria. It is now included with the rest of the Municipality of Laško in the Savinja Statistical Region.
