= Velike Gorelce =

- Location in Slovenia
- Coordinates: 46°7′8.28″N 15°18′41.61″E
- Country: Slovenia
- Traditional region: Styria
- Statistical region: Savinja
- Municipality: Laško

Area
  - Total: 2.25 km^{2} (0.87 sq mi)
- Elevation: 476.2 m (1,562 ft)

Population (2002)
  - Total: 71
- Postal code: 3270

Velike Gorelce (pronounced [ˈʋeːlikɛ ɡɔˈɾeːu̯tsɛ] or [ˈʋeːlikɛ ɡɔˈɾeːltsɛ]) is a village in the Municipality of Laško in eastern Slovenia. The area is part of the traditional region of Styria. It is now included with the rest of the municipality in the Savinja Statistical Region.
