= Trnov Hrib =

- Location in Slovenia
- Coordinates: 46°9′6.19″N 15°11′13.46″E
- Country: Slovenia
- Traditional region: Styria
- Statistical region: Savinja
- Municipality: Laško

Area
  - Total: 1.28 km^{2} (0.49 sq mi)
- Elevation: 501.1 m (1,644 ft)

Population (2002)
  - Total: 48
- Postal code: 3270

Trnov Hrib (pronounced [ˈtəɾnɔu̯ ˈxɾiːp]) is a settlement in the hills to the west of Laško in eastern Slovenia. The area is part of the traditional region of Styria. It is now included with the rest of the Municipality of Laško in the Savinja Statistical Region.

Archaeological evidence from the Brdo area points to an Iron Age settlement in the area.
