= Kuretno =

- Location in Slovenia
- Coordinates: 46°9′20.64″N 15°12′29.48″E
- Country: Slovenia
- Traditional region: Styria
- Statistical region: Savinja
- Municipality: Laško

Area
  - Total: 1.96 km^{2} (0.76 sq mi)
- Elevation: 419.1 m (1,375 ft)

Population (2002)
  - Total: 39
- Postal code: 3270

Kuretno (pronounced [ˈkuːɾɛtnɔ]) is a settlement in the Municipality of Laško in eastern Slovenia. The area is part of the traditional region of Styria. It is now included with the rest of the municipality in the Savinja Statistical Region.

The local church is dedicated to Saint Catherine and belongs to the Parish of Laško; it dates to the 15th century.
