= Mrzlo Polje, Laško =

Mrzlo Polje
- Location in Slovenia
- Coordinates: 46°6′44.18″N 15°22′5.93″E
- Country: Slovenia
- Traditional region: Styria
- Statistical region: Savinja
- Municipality: Laško

Area
  - Total: 1.39 km^{2} (0.54 sq mi)
- Elevation: 451.7 m (1,482 ft)

Population (2002)
  - Total: 61
- Postal code: 3273

Mrzlo Polje (pronounced [ˈməɾzlɔ ˈpoːljɛ]) is a settlement in the Municipality of Laško in eastern Slovenia. It lies in hills southeast of Laško. The area is part of the traditional region of Styria. It is now included with the rest of the municipality in the Savinja Statistical Region.
