= Trobni Dol =

- Location in Slovenia
- Coordinates: 46°8′15.85″N 15°21′14.36″E
- Country: Slovenia
- Traditional region: Styria
- Statistical region: Savinja
- Municipality: Laško

Area
  - Total: 4.12 km^{2} (1.59 sq mi)
- Elevation: 597.2 m (1,959 ft)

Population (2002)
  - Total: 150
- Postal code: 3271

Trobni Dol (pronounced [ˈtɾoːbni ˈdoːl]) is a settlement in the Municipality of Laško in eastern Slovenia. It lies in hills east of Laško. The area is part of the traditional region of Styria. It is now included with the rest of the municipality in the Savinja Statistical Region.

== Church ==
A chapel in the settlement is dedicated to Saint Barbara. It was built in 1993.
