= Suhadol, Laško =

Suhadol
- Location in Slovenia
- Coordinates: 46°6′3.4″N 15°8′41.97″E
- Country: Slovenia
- Traditional region: Styria
- Statistical region: Savinja
- Municipality: Laško

Area
  - Total: 1.28 km^{2} (0.49 sq mi)
- Elevation: 225.1 m (739 ft)

Population (2002)
  - Total: 25
- Postal code: 1432

Suhadol (pronounced [suxaˈdoːu̯] or [suxaˈdoːl]) is a settlement on the left bank of the Sava River in the Municipality of Laško in eastern Slovenia. The railway line from Ljubljana to Zidani Most runs through the settlement. The area is part of the traditional region of Styria. It is now included with the rest of the municipality in the Savinja Statistical Region.
