= Lahov Graben =

- Location in Slovenia
- Coordinates: 46°5′20.27″N 15°19′34.07″E
- Country: Slovenia
- Traditional region: Styria
- Statistical region: Savinja
- Municipality: Laško

Area
  - Total: 8.86 km^{2} (3.42 sq mi)
- Elevation: 380.8 m (1,249 ft)

Population (2002)
  - Total: 126
- Postal code: 3273

Lahov Graben (pronounced [ˈlaːxɔu̯ ˈɡɾaːbən]) is a settlement in the Municipality of Laško in eastern Slovenia. It lies in the hills southeast of Laško. The area is part of the traditional region of Styria. It is now included with the rest of the municipality in the Savinja Statistical Region.

The local church is dedicated to the Holy Trinity and belongs to the Parish of Jurklošter. It was first mentioned in written documents dating to 1545, but was entirely rebuilt in 1733.
