= Laziše =

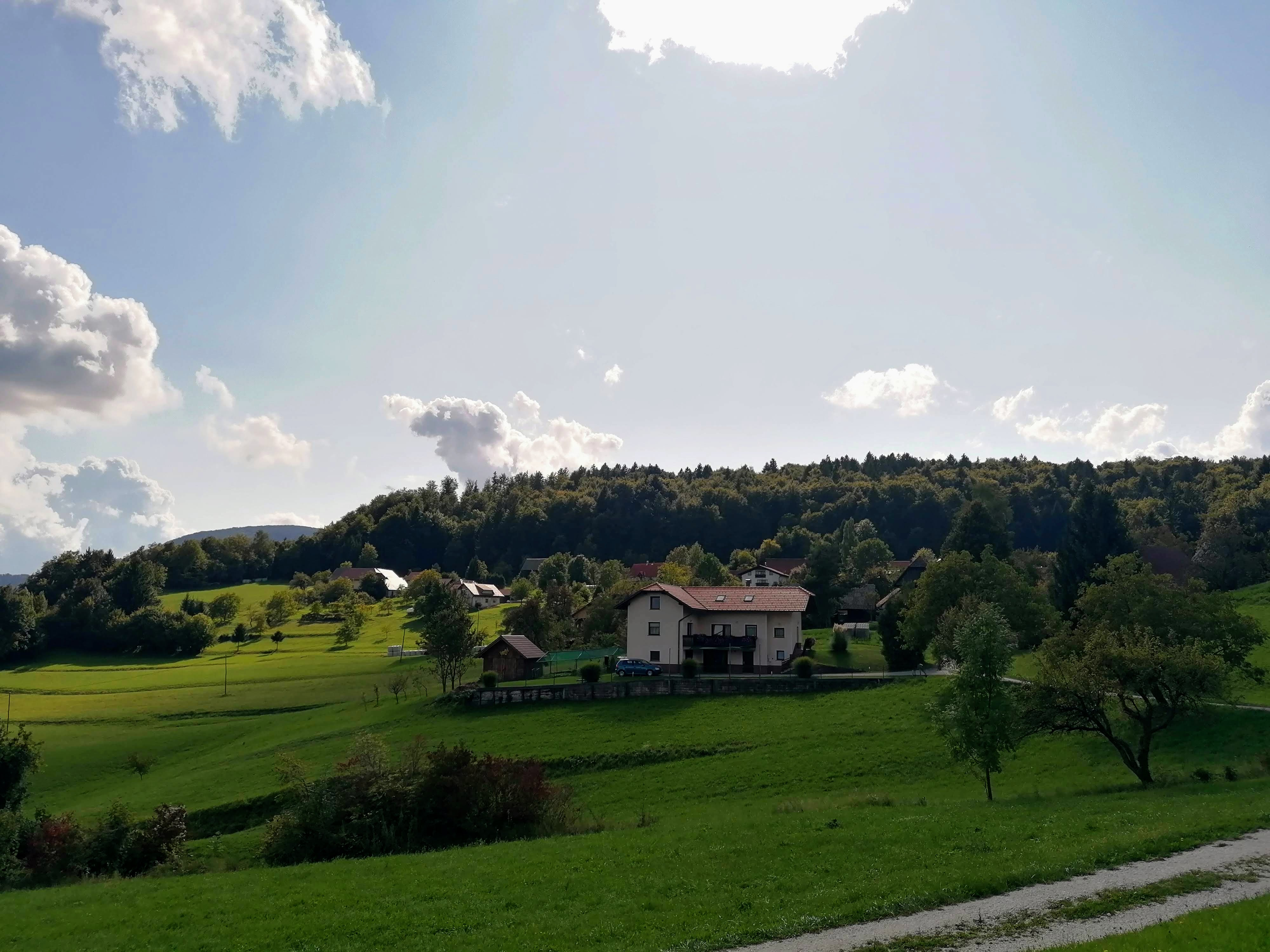

- Location in Slovenia
- Coordinates: 46°7′33.48″N 15°14′40.44″E
- Country: Slovenia
- Traditional region: Styria
- Statistical region: Savinja
- Municipality: Laško

Area
  - Total: 1.63 km^{2} (0.63 sq mi)
- Elevation: 523 m (1,716 ft)

Population (2002)
  - Total: 78
- Postal code: 3272

Laziše (pronounced [laˈziːʃɛ]) is a settlement in the Municipality of Laško in eastern Slovenia. It lies in hills south of Laško. The area is part of the traditional region of Styria. It is now included with the rest of the municipality in the Savinja Statistical Region.

The local parish church is dedicated to Saint Nicholas (Slovene: sveti Miklavž) and belongs to the Roman Catholic Diocese of Celje. It was first mentioned in written documents dating to 1545.
