= Reka, Laško =

Reka
- Location in Slovenia
- Coordinates: 46°9′21.05″N 15°16′46.3″E
- Country: Slovenia
- Traditional region: Styria
- Statistical region: Savinja
- Municipality: Laško

Area
  - Total: 1.4 km^{2} (0.54 sq mi)
- Elevation: 332.5 m (1,091 ft)

Population (2002)
  - Total: 164
- Postal code: 3270

Reka (pronounced [ˈɾeːka]) is a settlement in the Municipality of Laško in eastern Slovenia. It lies in hills east of Laško. The area is part of the traditional region of Styria. It is now included with the rest of the municipality in the Savinja Statistical Region.

== Mass grave ==
Reka is the site of a mass grave from the end of the Second World War. The Reka No. 20 Mass Grave (Slovene: Grobišče pri domačiji Reka 20) is located southwest of the village center, on a steep slope about 50 meters (160 ft) southwest of the farm at Reka no. 20. It contains the remains of 14 Croatian civilians that were shot by a Partisan unit in May 1945 and buried in the orchard below the farm.
