= Širje =

Širje Marija-Širje (until 1955)
- Location in Slovenia
- Coordinates: 46°5′45.58″N 15°9′57.77″E
- Country: Slovenia
- Traditional region: Styria
- Statistical region: Savinja
- Municipality: Laško

Area
  - Total: 2.21 km^{2} (0.85 sq mi)
- Elevation: 461.3 m (1,513 ft)

Population (2002)
  - Total: 48
- Postal code: 1432

Širje (pronounced [ˈʃiːɾjɛ]) is a settlement in the Municipality of Laško in eastern Slovenia. It lies on the left bank of the Sava River, immediately northwest of Zidani Most. The area is part of the traditional region of Styria. It is now included with the rest of the municipality in the Savinja Statistical Region.

== Name ==
The name of the settlement was changed from Marija-Širje (literally, 'Our Lady of Širje') to Širje in 1955. The name was changed on the basis of the 1948 Law on Names of Settlements and Designations of Squares, Streets, and Buildings as part of efforts by Slovenia's postwar communist government to remove religious elements from toponyms.

== Church ==
The parish church, known as Marija Širje, is dedicated to the Immaculate Conception and belongs to the Roman Catholic Diocese of Celje. It was originally a Romanesque building that was extended in 1747 and partially rebuilt in 1873.
