= Obrežje pri Zidanem Mostu =

Obrežje pri Zidanem Mostu Sveti Peter pri Loki (until 1955)
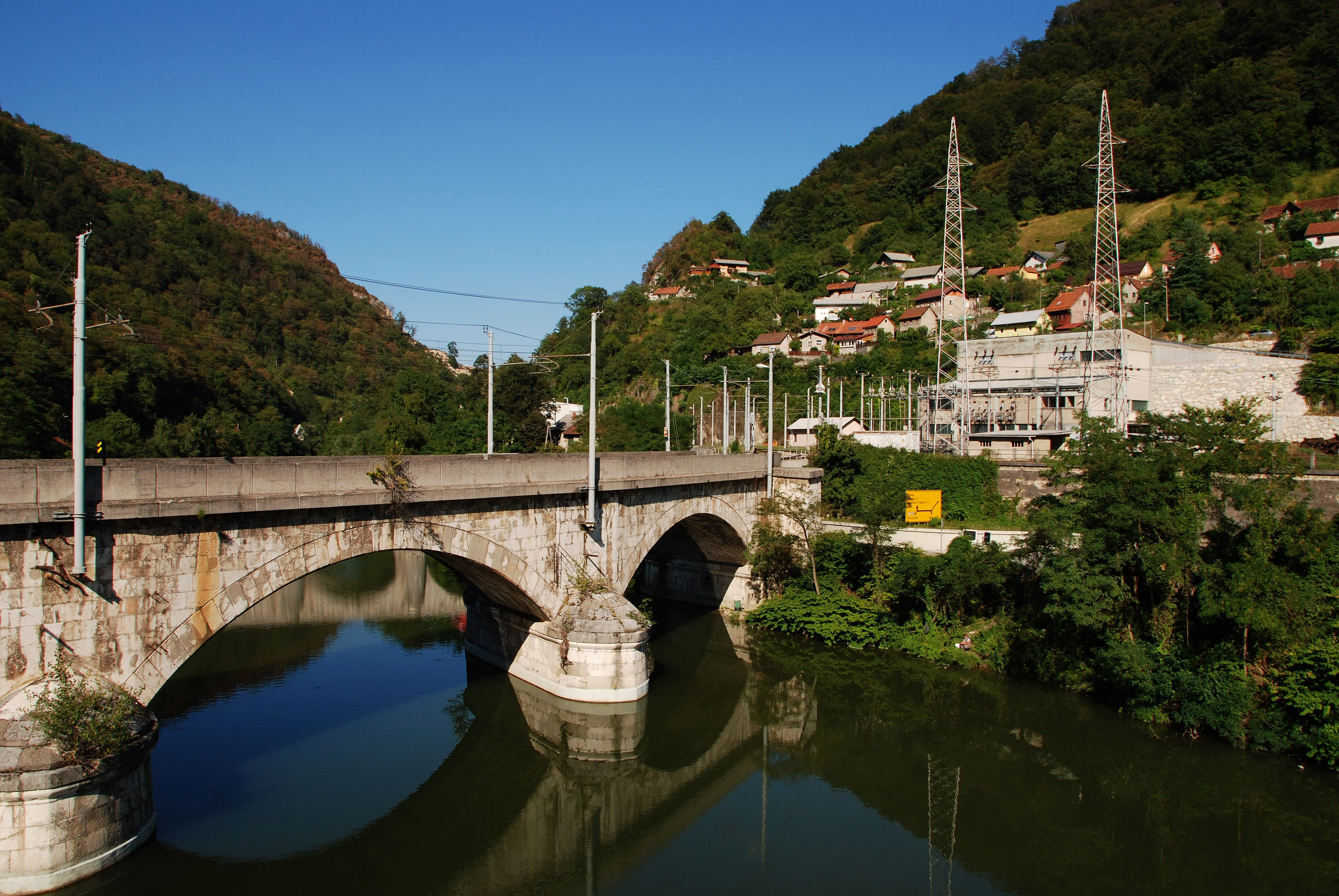

- Location in Slovenia
- Coordinates: 46°5′2.36″N 15°10′27.94″E
- Country: Slovenia
- Traditional region: Styria
- Statistical region: Savinja
- Municipality: Laško

Area
  - Total: 4.64 km^{2} (1.79 sq mi)
- Elevation: 206.6 m (678 ft)

Population (2002)
  - Total: 135
- Postal code: 1432

Obrežje pri Zidanem Mostu (pronounced [ɔˈbɾeːʒjɛ pɾi ˈziːdanɛm ˈmoːstu]) is a settlement in the Municipality of Laško in eastern Slovenia. It lies on the left bank of the Savinja River, close to its confluence with the Sava, opposite Zidani Most. The area is part of the traditional region of Styria. It is now included with the rest of the municipality in the Savinja Statistical Region.

== Name ==
The name of the settlement was changed from Sveti Peter pri Loki (literally, 'Saint Peter near Loka') to Obrežje pri Zidanem Mostu (literally, 'river bank near Zidani Most') in 1955. The name was changed on the basis of the 1948 Law on Names of Settlements and Designations of Squares, Streets, and Buildings as part of efforts by Slovenia's postwar communist government to remove religious elements from toponyms.
