= Marija Gradec =

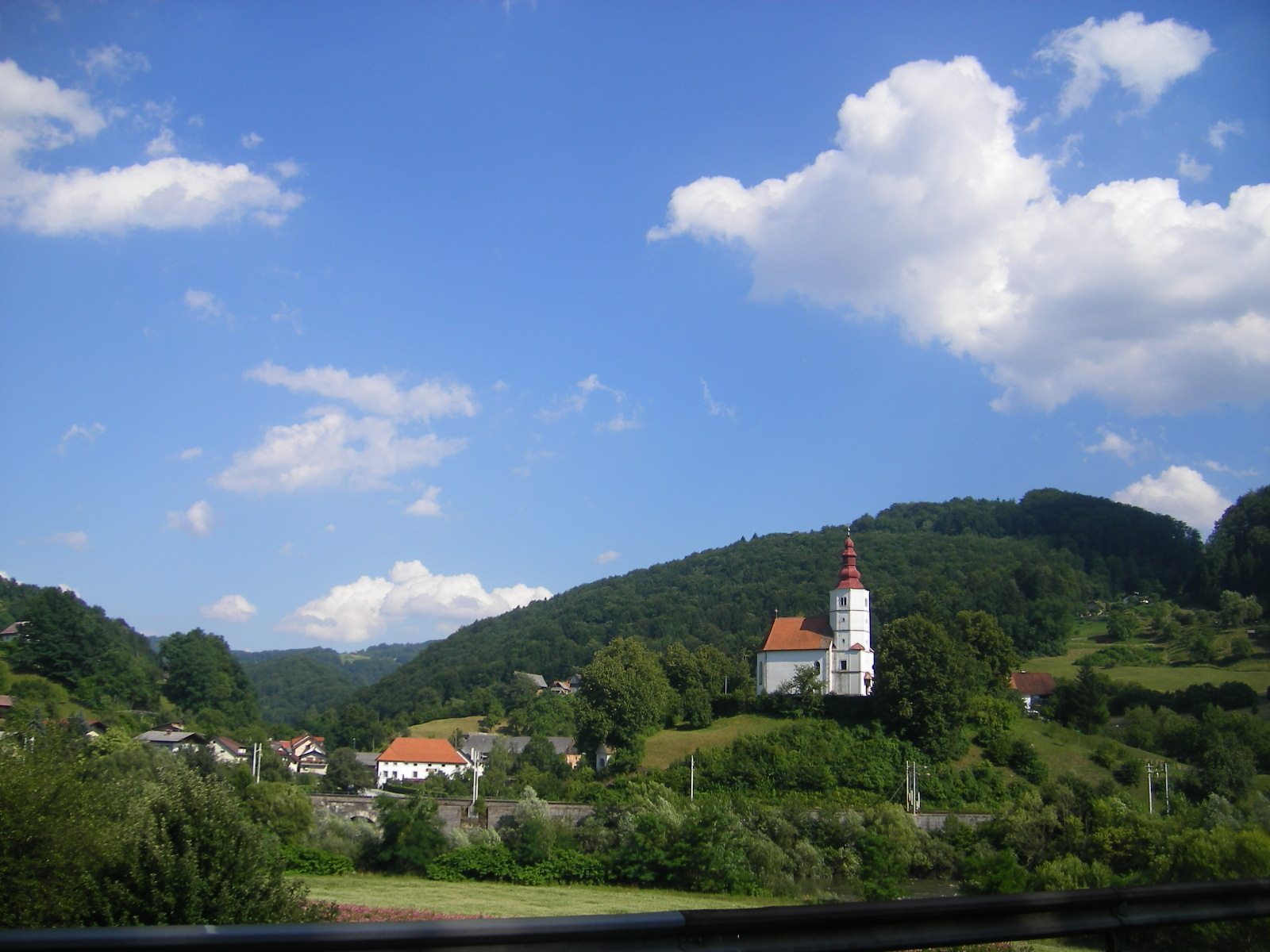

- Location in Slovenia
- Coordinates: 46°8′39.28″N 15°14′21.17″E
- Country: Slovenia
- Traditional region: Styria
- Statistical region: Savinja
- Municipality: Laško

Area
  - Total: 1.01 km^{2} (0.39 sq mi)
- Elevation: 222.1 m (729 ft)

Population (2002)
  - Total: 268
- Postal code: 3270

Marija Gradec (pronounced [maˈɾiːja ˈɡɾaːdəts]) is a settlement in the Municipality of Laško in eastern Slovenia. It lies on the left bank of the Savinja River, just south of the town of Laško. The area is part of the traditional region of Styria. It is now included with the rest of the municipality in the Savinja Statistical Region.

== Church ==
The local church is dedicated to Our Lady of Mount Carmel and belongs to the Parish of Laško. It is a late-Gothic building dating to the early 16th century. It is painted with frescos that include late-Gothic and Renaissance elements. There are four 18th-century chapel-shrines in front of the church.
