= Jagoče, Laško =

Jagoče
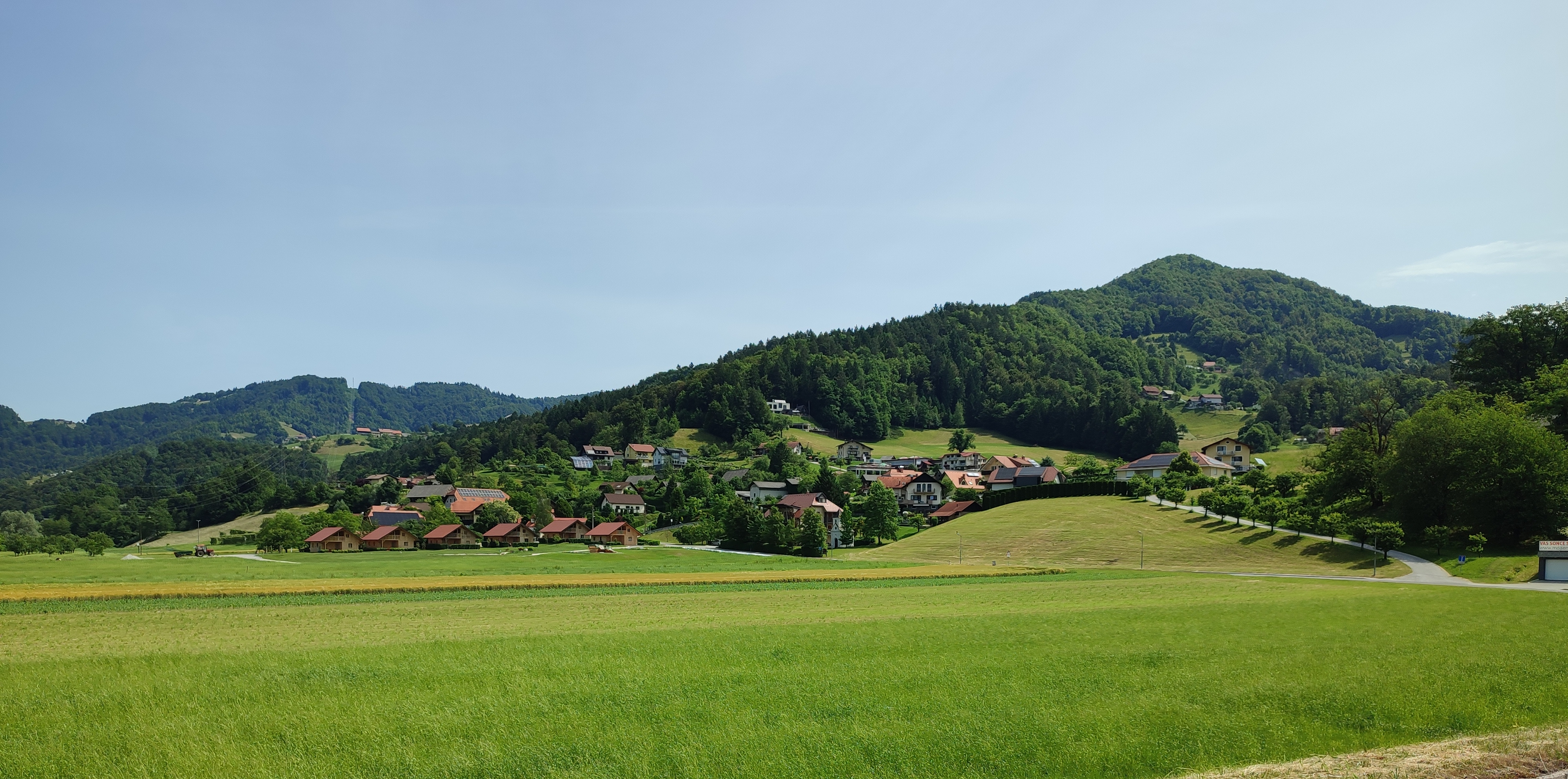

- Location in Slovenia
- Coordinates: 46°10′9.01″N 15°14′17.36″E
- Country: Slovenia
- Traditional region: Styria
- Statistical region: Savinja
- Municipality: Laško

Area
  - Total: 0.57 km^{2} (0.22 sq mi)
- Elevation: 234.5 m (769 ft)

Population (2002)
  - Total: 153
- Postal code: 3270

Jagoče (pronounced [ˈjaːɡɔtʃɛ]) is a settlement on the right bank of the Savinja River, north of Laško in eastern Slovenia. The area is part of the traditional region of Styria. It is now included with the rest of the Municipality of Laško in the Savinja Statistical Region.
