= Male Grahovše =

- Location in Slovenia
- Coordinates: 46°7′55.29″N 15°18′25.1″E
- Country: Slovenia
- Traditional region: Styria
- Statistical region: Savinja
- Municipality: Laško

Area
  - Total: 1.49 km^{2} (0.58 sq mi)
- Elevation: 576.4 m (1,891 ft)

Population (2002)
  - Total: 50
- Postal code: 3270

Male Grahovše (pronounced [ˈmaːlɛ ˈɡɾaːxɔu̯ʃɛ]) is a village in the hills east of Laško in eastern Slovenia. The area is part of the traditional region of Styria. It is now included with the rest of the Municipality of Laško in the Savinja Statistical Region.
