= Anton Aškerc =

Slovenian poet and Roman Catholic priest

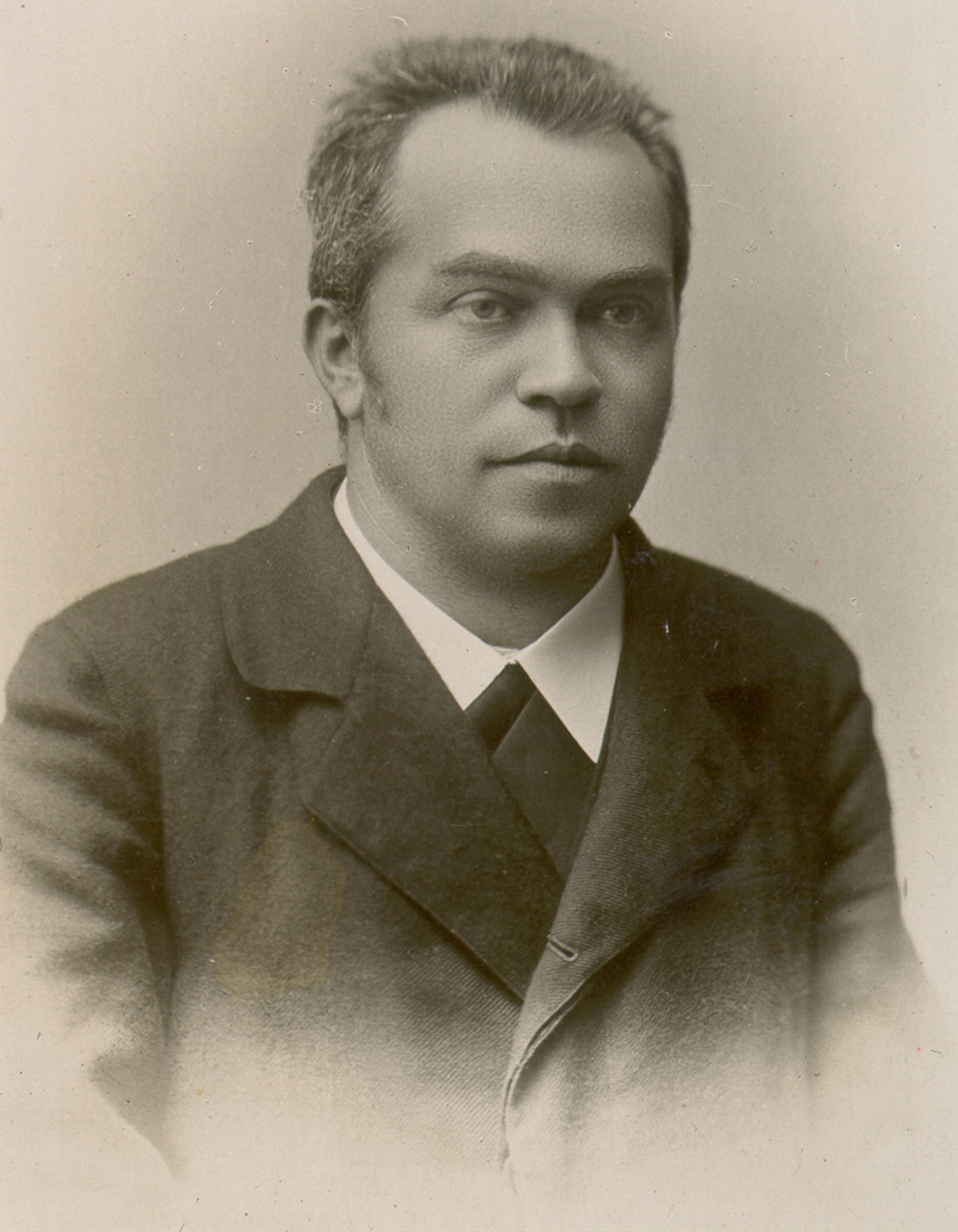
Anton Aškerc

Anton Aškerc (pronounced [anˈtoːn ˈaːʃkɛrts]; 9 January 1856 – 10 June 1912) was a Slovenian poet and Roman Catholic priest who worked in Austria, best known for his epic poems.

Aškerc was born into a peasant family near the town of Rimske Toplice in the Duchy of Styria, then part of the Austrian Empire (now in Slovenia), and baptized Anton Askerz. His place of birth is recorded as at house no. 5 (i.e., the Hrušovar farm, his father's house) in Senožete, which at the time was a hamlet of Rimske Toplice (German: Töplitz). However, family tradition says that he was born at house no. 15 in Globoko. After graduating from high school in Celje he entered the Roman Catholic theological seminary in Maribor. He was ordained a priest in 1880. The same year he published his first poem entitled Trije popotniki (The Three Travelers) in the progressive literary magazine Ljubljanski zvon.

He started his literary career by writing lyric poetry, but after 1882 moved to more epic themes. His post-romantic poems express his patriotism, love and religious doubt. The themes of his ballades and romances come from Slovene and Slavic history, the Bible, folk traditions as well as contemporary life. He became strongly influenced by literary realism, writing some of his best known poems in this style, but never fully rejected post-romanticism.

Aškerc published his poems in the journal Ljubljanski zvon under the pseudonym Gorázd from 1881, but used his real name in his first poetry collection, Balade in romance (Ballades and Romances) published in 1890. The collection was warmly accepted by the reading public and critics, but was criticized from the emerging Catholic political activists, such as the bishop Anton Mahnič, who disapproved of Aškerc's national, freethinking and progressive social ideals. Aškerc took an early retirement from his priesthood service. Soon afterwards, he was appointed by Ivan Hribar, the liberal mayor of Ljubljana, as a chief archivist of the Ljubljana City Archives, which he remained until his death.

During the last twenty years of his life, his relationship with the conservative Catholic clergy worsened, as did the quality of his literary work. He continued to enjoy full support from the liberal political establishment in Carniola, led by Ivan Tavčar and Ivan Hribar. His friendship with the Swedish slavist and historian Alfred Anton Jensen opened him the doors to international recognition: his poems were published in Sweden, Russia, Galicia, Croatia, Serbia, and in the Czech Lands. However, he started losing his influence over younger Slovenian authors. He rejected the poetry of Dragotin Kette and Josip Murn and entered in a dispute with the poet Oton Župančič, from which he came as a clear loser. The young writer Ivan Cankar, whom Aškerc admired, also published several critically sarcastic essays on Aškerc's late poetry, in which he targeted Aškerc as being the symptom of the decay of the old Slovenian provincial national-liberal élite.

Despite the bitter last years of his life – in addition to everything mentioned, he lived in a constant fear of losing his job if the conservative Slovenian People's Party had won the municipal elections, which didn't happen -, his funeral in Ljubljana was attended by a huge mass of people, among whom were many of his former adversaries.

One of the main thoroughfares in south-central Ljubljana, Aškerc Street (Slovene: Aškerčeva cesta), is named after him, as are several other public places and institutions.

== See also ==
- Simon Gregorčič
- List of Slovene-language poets
