= Modrica =

Modrica may refer to:

- Modriča, a town and municipality in Bosnia and Herzegovina
- Modrica (Kruševac), a small village in Serbia
