= Veliko Širje =

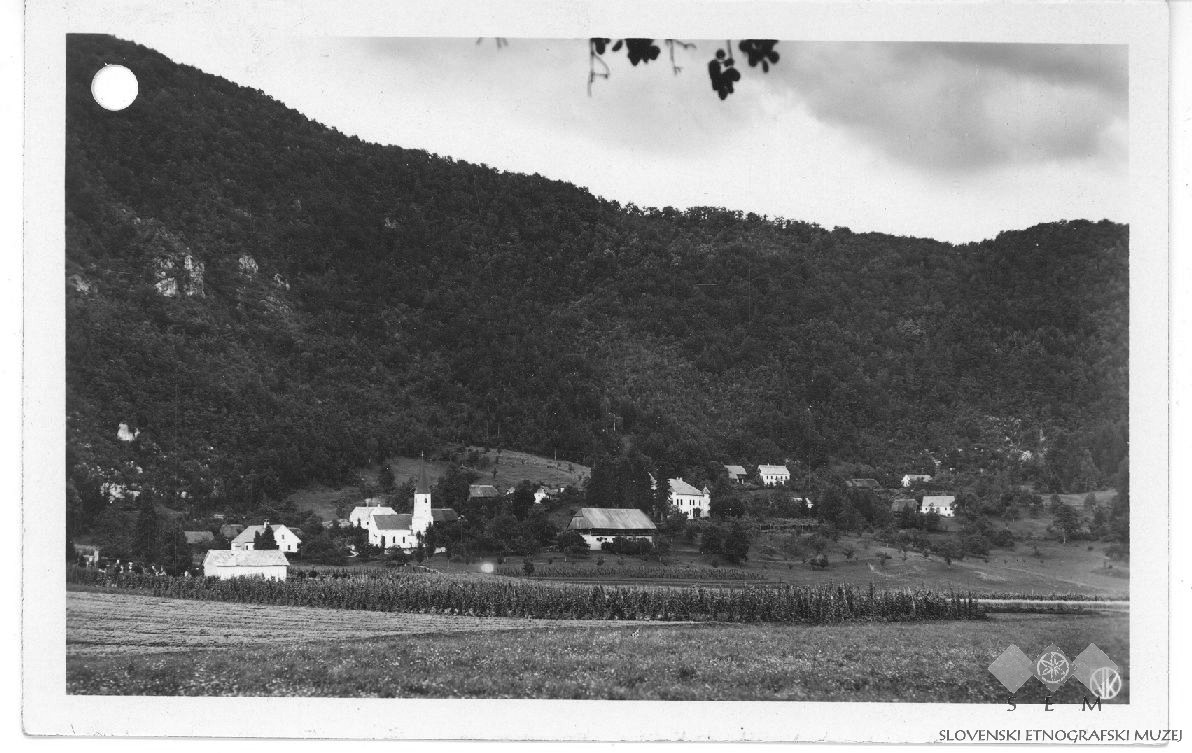
- Postcard of Veliko Širje

- Location in Slovenia
- Coordinates: 46°5′45.36″N 15°11′14.64″E
- Country: Slovenia
- Traditional region: Styria
- Statistical region: Savinja
- Municipality: Laško

Area
  - Total: 6.23 km^{2} (2.41 sq mi)
- Elevation: 364.7 m (1,197 ft)

Population (2002)
  - Total: 259
- Postal code: 1432

Veliko Širje (pronounced [ˈʋeːlikɔ ˈʃiːɾjɛ]) is a settlement in the Municipality of Laško in eastern Slovenia. It lies in hills above the right bank of the Savinja River north of Zidani Most. The area is part of the traditional region of Styria. It is now included with the rest of the municipality in the Savinja Statistical Region.
