= Harje =

- Location in Slovenia
- Coordinates: 46°8′11.63″N 15°15′14.63″E
- Country: Slovenia
- Traditional region: Styria
- Statistical region: Savinja
- Municipality: Laško

Area
  - Total: 1.77 km^{2} (0.68 sq mi)
- Elevation: 284.2 m (932 ft)

Population (2002)
  - Total: 129
- Postal code: 3270

Harje (pronounced [ˈxaːɾjɛ]) is a village in the Municipality of Laško in eastern Slovenia. It lies south of Laško in the valley of a minor left tributary of the Savinja River. The area is part of the traditional region of Styria. It is now included with the rest of the municipality in the Savinja Statistical Region.
