= Šentrupert, Laško =

Šentrupert Sveti Rupert (until 1952), Breze (1952–1994)
- Location in Slovenia
- Coordinates: 46°10′2.71″N 15°21′23.44″E
- Country: Slovenia
- Traditional region: Styria
- Statistical region: Savinja
- Municipality: Laško

Area
  - Total: 5.79 km^{2} (2.24 sq mi)
- Elevation: 491.5 m (1,613 ft)

Population (2002)
  - Total: 361
- Postal code: 3271

Šentrupert (pronounced [ʃɛnˈtɾúːpɛɾt, - ʃənˈ-]) is a settlement in the Municipality of Laško in eastern Slovenia. The area is part of the traditional region of Styria. It is now included with the rest of the municipality in the Savinja Statistical Region.

== Name ==
The name of the settlement was changed from Sveti Rupert (literally, 'Saint Rupert') to Breze (literally, 'birches') in 1952. The name was changed on the basis of the 1948 Law on Names of Settlements and Designations of Squares, Streets, and Buildings as part of efforts by Slovenia's postwar communist government to remove religious elements from toponyms. The name Sveti Rupert was restored in a contracted form in 1994 as Šentrupert.

== Church ==
The local parish church, from which the settlement gets its name, is dedicated to Saint Rupert and belongs to the Roman Catholic Diocese of Celje. It dates to the 16th century.
