= Rimske Toplice =

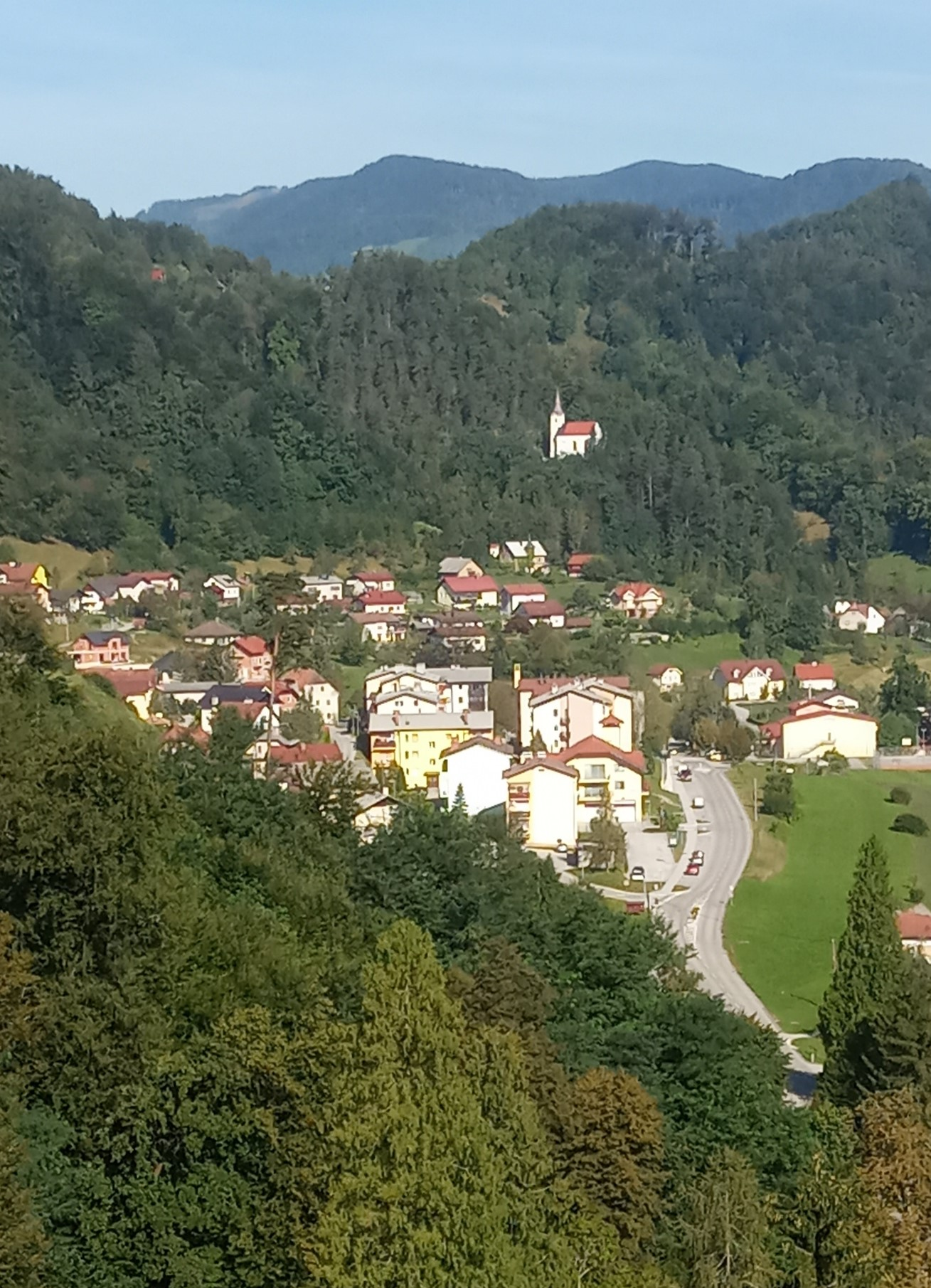

- Location in Slovenia
- Coordinates: 46°6′58.04″N 15°11′41.43″E
- Country: Slovenia
- Traditional region: Styria
- Statistical region: Savinja
- Municipality: Laško

Area
  - Total: 4.32 km^{2} (1.67 sq mi)
- Elevation: 422.7 m (1,387 ft)

Population (2002)
  - Total: 822
- Postal code: 3272

Rimske Toplice (pronounced [ˈɾiːmskɛ tɔˈpliːtsɛ]) is a settlement in the Municipality of Laško in eastern Slovenia. It lies on the right bank of the Savinja River on the road from Celje to Ljubljana via Zidani Most. The area is part of the traditional region of Styria. It is now included with the rest of the municipality in the Savinja Statistical Region.

== Geography ==
The location of Rimske Toplice is surrounded by wooded slopes of the nearby mountains, providing shelter against wind and summer heat, and supporting rich vegetation of exotic plants from all over the world. These include giant sequoias, Canadian hemlocks, cypresses, and Californian cedars.

== Name ==
The name Rimske Toplice literally means 'Roman hot springs'. The settlement was attested in written sources in 1265 as Toplitz (and as Töplitz in 1482 and Toplica in 1486). The name comes from the Slovene common noun toplica 'hot spring'. Until the mid-19th century, the settlement was simply known as Toplice (literally, 'hot springs') or sometimes Toplice pri Laškem (literally, 'hot springs near Laško'). The epithet 'Roman' was first applied to the place in 1826 by Mathias Macher (1793–1876) to distinguish it from other hot springs. Baths using the hot springs were already located at the site in Roman times, as testified by the discovery of statuary and coins during excavations.

== Church ==
The local parish church is dedicated to Saint Margaret and belongs to the Roman Catholic Diocese of Celje. It is a 13th-century building that has been rebuilt over the centuries. A second church on a small hill west of the main settlement is dedicated to Our Lady of Lourdes and belongs to the same parish. It was built between 1885 and 1886.

== Notable people ==
Notable people that were born or lived in Rimske Toplice include:

- Anton Aškerc (1856–1912), poet

== Thermal spas ==
The healing power of natural springs was valued by the Romans. They enjoyed the benefits and healing power on the right bank of the Savinja River, where there are still thermal springs under Stražnik Hill (655 m), rising from triassic dolomite rock fissures in Rimske Toplice. Monuments and sacrificial altars devoted to goddesses and nymphs as thanksgiving for the convalescence of ancient guests, found between 1769 and 1845, provide evidence of this.

The spas were first mentioned in written documents dating to 1486, the Aquilea Document. The spas were owned by the Habsburgs for 30 years and then by the Counts of Celje (1456) together with the Laško Estate. Through history the baths owners changed numerous times. The first turnabout in the spa's history was in 1840, when the former wholesale merchant from Trieste Gustav Adolf Uhlich bought the spas on behalf of his wife Amalia because he was healed by the healing power of the thermal water there. This was when what had been a modest health resort was turned into the modern spas and given the name Rimske Toplice ('Roman Spas'). For the needs of the spa, two large wells were regulated and named Amalia's Spring (38.4 °C) and Roman Spring (36.3 °C). With the construction of the Sophia Manor, the number of rooms increased from 38 to 100 at first and then to over 200. On the even plateau with a chestnut tree promenade there was a spa church on one side and an orchestra pavilion on the other side. In the afternoon the orchestra played out in the open, on evenings in the spa salon. There was a billiard room, a tennis court in a nearby wood and on a steep meadow a roofed bowling alley. Because the Vienna–Trieste railroad passed Rimske Toplice after 1848; more guests visited the place, all of them better-off people from Trieste, Hungary, Zagreb, or even the United States. Most of them were Germans from all over the monarchy. A sensation for all of them was the visit of the British princess and Prussian heiress Victoria, who stayed at Rimske Toplice in 1879, using it as a starting point for trips in the surrounding countryside. The most distinguished guests had the habit of planting exotic trees in the spa's park, so even nowadays you can see huge sequoias, Canadian hemlocks, cypresses, Californian cedars, and other interesting species.

Russian prisoners of war built a 2 km promenade through the forest (The Roman Path) during the First World War. Open thermal baths from 1931 were an important achievement. During the Second World War the spa was occupied by wounded German soldiers and the owner (a member of the Uhlich family) and his family moved away at the end of the war.

After that the Yugoslav People's Army used the spa for healing and rehabilitation of its soldiers. The spas have never been fully utilized by common Slovenian people. Although the Uhlich Family were good masters and turned the humble bath into spas of world reputation, they dominated over the local population. Also when Yugoslav People's Army managed the spas, they were more or less inaccessible to the local people.

From 1991 onwards, after the Yugoslav People's Army left, attempts were made to revive Rimske Toplice. Finally, on 17 November 2005 the thermal spas once again opened their doors to guests, with the Medical Rehabilitation Center aiding the revival of the town's fortunes.

== Gallery ==
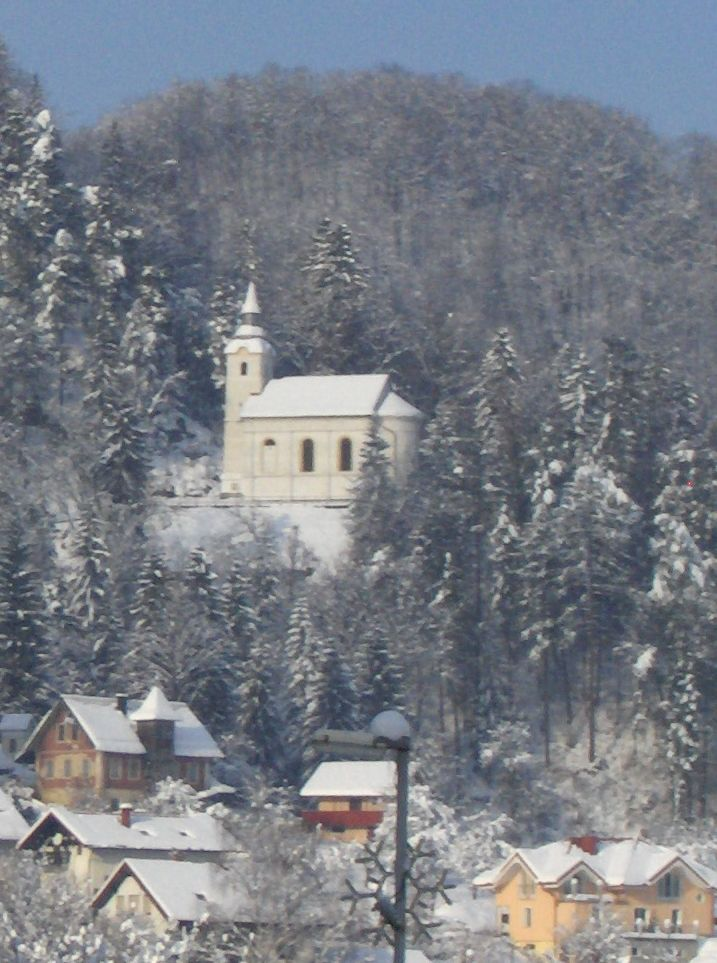

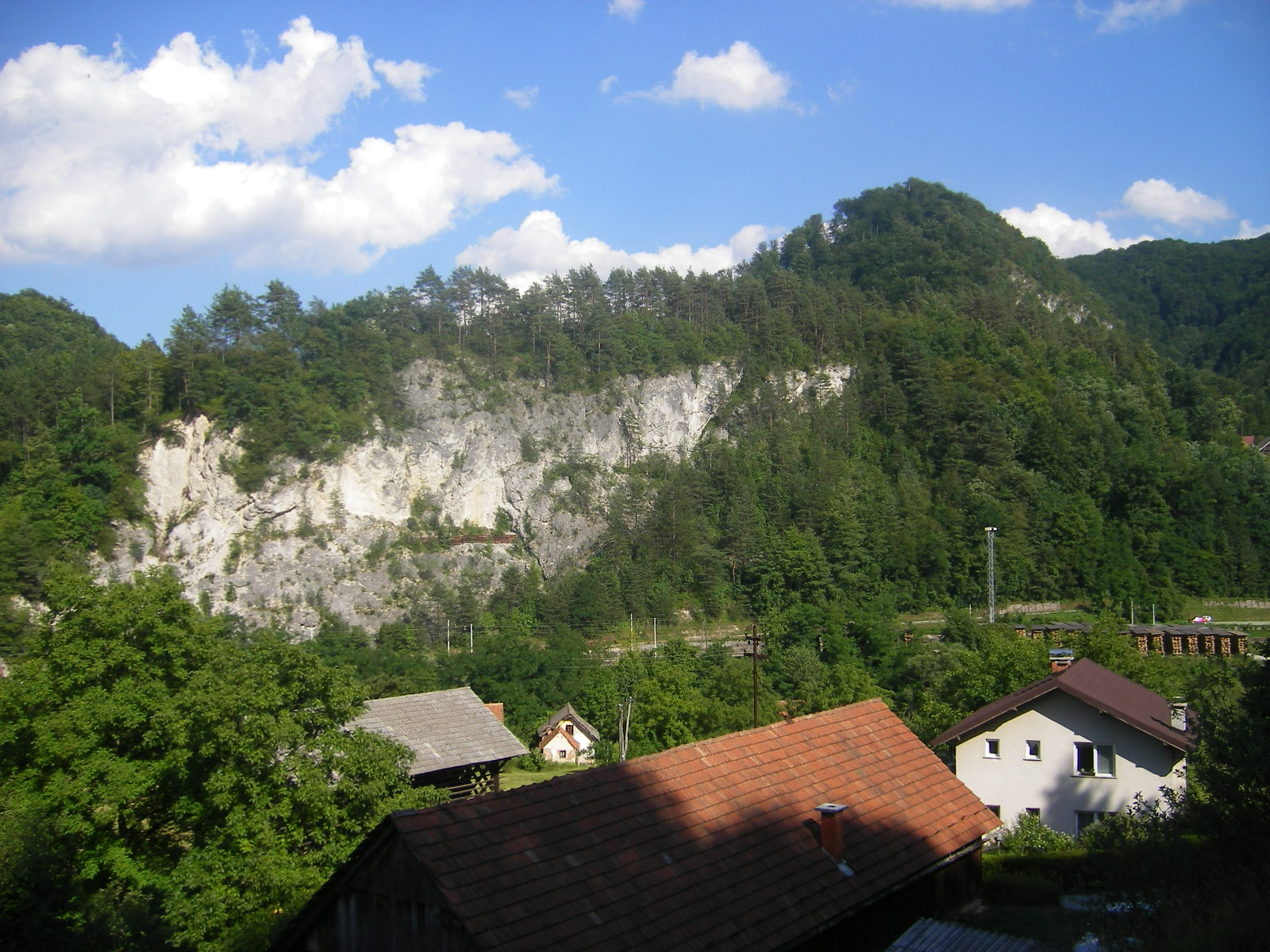
