= Slivnica =

Slivnica or Slivnitsa may refer to

Bulgaria

- Slivnitsa, a town in western Bulgaria
  - Battle of Slivnitsa, 1885

Croatia

- Slivnica, Croatia, a settlement in the Municipality of Zadar

North Macedonia

- Slivnica, Resen

Serbia

- Slivnica (Dimitrovgrad)
- Slivnica (Vranje)

Slovenia

- Slivnica pri Mariboru, a settlement in the Municipality of Hoče-Slivnica
- Slivnica pri Celju, a village in the Municipality of Šentjur
- Slivnica (mountain), near Cerknica, Inner Carniola
- Spodnja Slivnica, a settlement in the Municipality of Grosuplje
- Zgornja Slivnica, a settlement in the Municipality of Grosuplje
