= Čeplje =

Čeplje is a Slovene place name that may refer to:

- Čeplje, Kočevje, a village in the Municipality of Kočevje, southern Slovenia
- Čeplje, Litija, a village in the Municipality of Litija, central Slovenia
- Čeplje, Lukovica, a village in the Municipality of Lukovica, central Slovenia
- Čeplje, Vransko, a village in the Municipality of Vransko, central Slovenia
