= Selo =

Selo is a Slavic term for a type of village.

It may also refer to:

== Places ==
=== Slovenia ===
- Selo, Ajdovščina, a village in southwestern Slovenia
- Selo, Krško, a village in southeastern Slovenia
- Selo, Moravske Toplice, a village near in northeastern Slovenia
- Selo, Sežana, a village in southwestern Slovenia
- Selo, Žiri, a village in northwestern Slovenia
- Selo, former name of Zgornja Slivnica, a village near Grosuplje, southwestern Slovenia
- Selo nad Laškim, a village near Laško, eastern Slovenia
- Selo nad Polhovim Gradcem, a village near Dobrova–Polhov Gradec, central Slovenia
- Selo pri Bledu, a village near Bled, northwestern Slovenia
- Selo pri Ihanu, a village near Domžale, central Slovenia
- Selo pri Kostelu, a village near Kostel, southern Slovenia
- Selo pri Mirni, a village near Mirna, southeastern Slovenia
- Selo pri Moravčah, a village near Moravče, northern Slovenia
- Selo pri Pancah, a village near Ljubljana, central Slovenia
- Selo pri Radohovi Vasi, a village near Ivančna Gorica, southeastern Slovenia
- Selo pri Robu, a village near Velike Lašče, southern Slovenia
- Selo pri Vodicah, a village near Vodice, central Slovenia
- Selo pri Vranskem, a village near Vransko, northeastern Slovenia
- Selo pri Zagorici, a village near Mirna Peč, southeastern Slovenia
- Selo pri Žirovnici, a village near Žirovnica, northwestern Slovenia

=== Elsewhere ===
- Selo, Dropull, a village in Albania
- Selo, Croatia, a village near Čabar
- Selo, Java, a village between Mount Merapi and Mount Merbabu
- Selo, Russia, several rural localities in Russia

== See also ==
- Sela (disambiguation)
- Novo Selo (disambiguation)
- Staro Selo (disambiguation)
