= Zahomce =

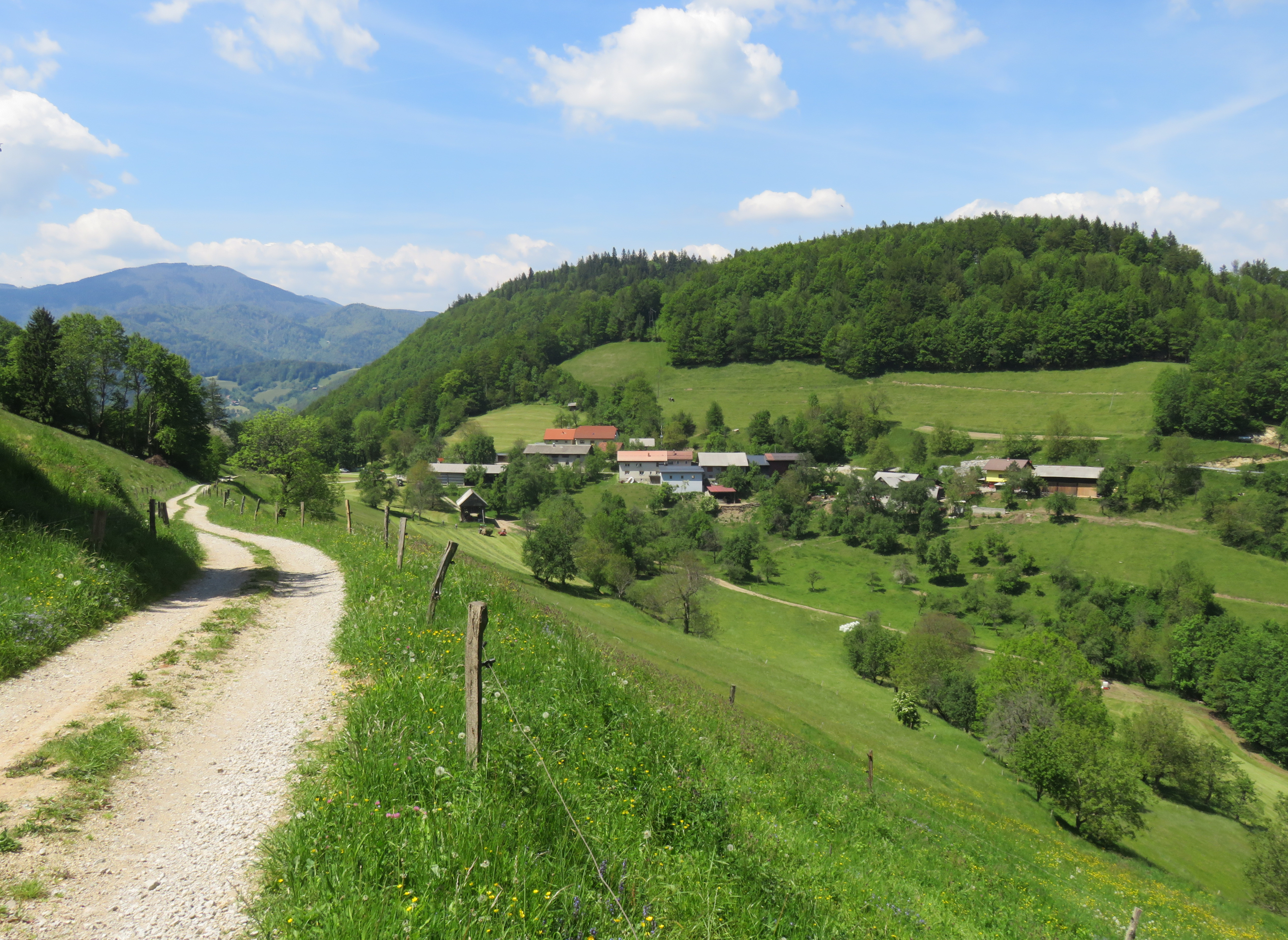

- Location in Slovenia
- Coordinates: 46°13′55.33″N 14°57′21.78″E
- Country: Slovenia
- Traditional region: Styria
- Statistical region: Savinja
- Municipality: Vransko

Area
  - Total: 3.98 km^{2} (1.54 sq mi)
- Elevation: 586.6 m (1,925 ft)

Population (2020)
  - Total: 66

Zahomce (pronounced [zaˈxoːmtsɛ]) is a dispersed settlement in the hills south of Vransko in central Slovenia. The area is included in the Savinja Statistical Region and is part of the traditional region of Lower Styria.
