= Prekopa =

Prekopa may refer to:

- Prekopa, Međimurje County, a village near Štrigova, Croatia
- Prekopa, Sisak-Moslavina County, a village near Glina, Croatia
- Prekopa, Slovenia, a settlement in the Municipality of Vransko, Slovenia
