= Tešova =

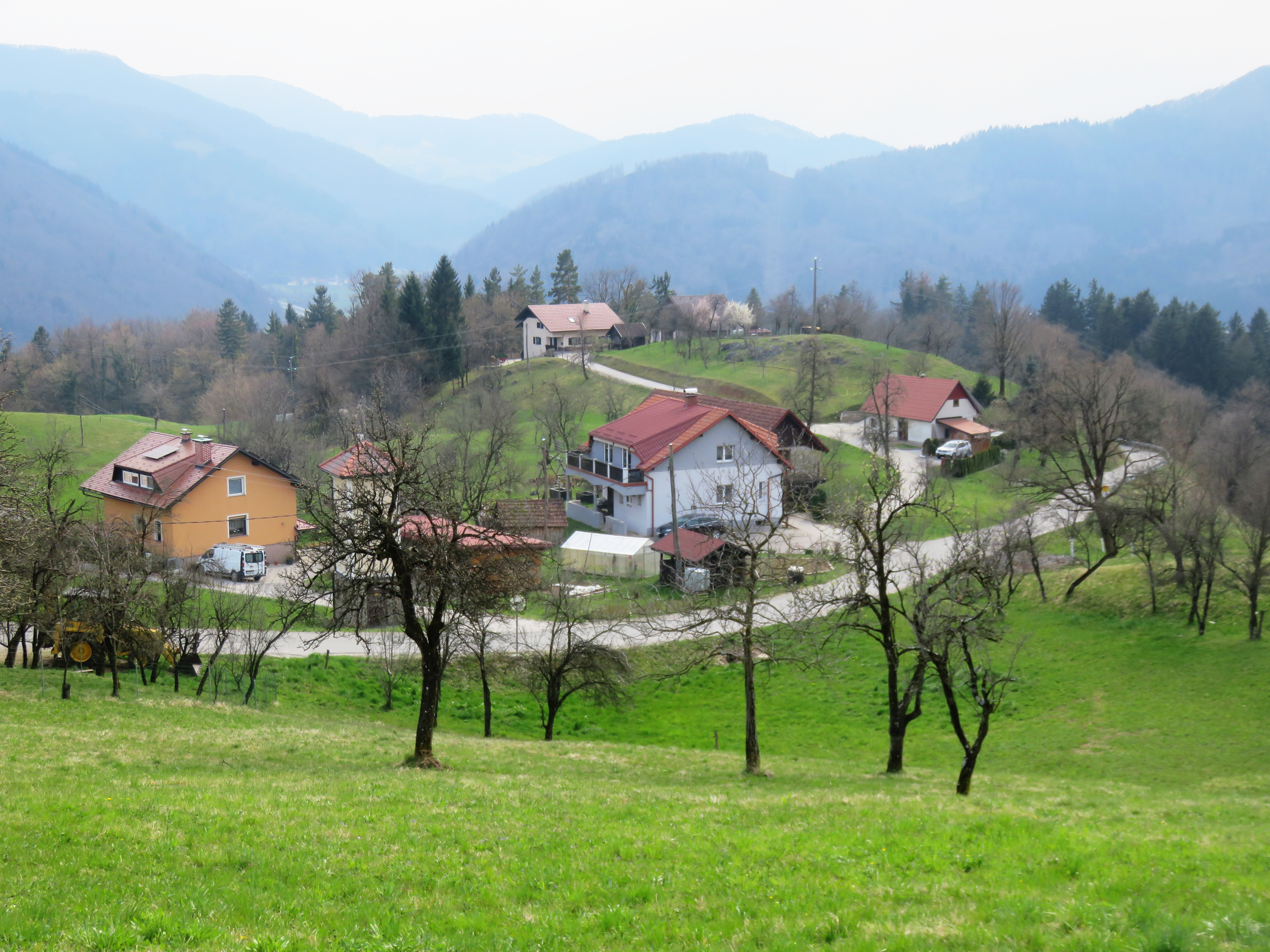

- Location in Slovenia
- Coordinates: 46°15′19.86″N 14°56′58.37″E
- Country: Slovenia
- Traditional region: Styria
- Statistical region: Savinja
- Municipality: Vransko

Area
  - Total: 1.28 km^{2} (0.49 sq mi)
- Elevation: 501.8 m (1,646 ft)

Population (2002)
  - Total: 110

Tešova (pronounced [ˈteːʃɔʋa]) is a settlement in the hills north of Vransko in central Slovenia. The area is part of the traditional region of Styria. The Municipality of Vransko is now included in the Savinja Statistical Region.

A small chapel-shrine in the settlement dates to the late 19th century.
