= Petro Golubka =

Ukrainian-Canadian chess grandmaster (born 1989)

Personal information
- Native name: Петро Олександрович Голубка
- Born: 9 May 1989 (age 37) Vyhoda, Kalush Raion, Ivano-Frankivsk Oblast, Ukrainian SSR, Soviet Union

Chess career
- Country: Ukraine (until 2025); Canada (since 2025)
- Title: Grandmaster (2020)
- Peak rating: 2509 (April 2018)

Petro Oleksandrovych Golubka (Ukrainian: Петро Олександрович Голубка; born 9 May 1989) is a Ukrainian and Canadian (since 2025) chess player. He was awarded the titles of FIDE Master in 2008, International Master in 2012, and Grandmaster in 2020.

== Career ==
Golubka won the Ukrainian Chess Championship in 2017 in Zhytomyr, tying on 8/11 points with Grandmaster Volodymyr Onyshchuk and claiming the title on tiebreaks.

He graduated from the Lviv State University of Physical Culture. In 2019, competing as a recent graduate, he represented Ukraine at the 6th European Universities Mind Sports Championships, winning individual gold in blitz and silver on board two in the rapid team event.

Following the Russian invasion of Ukraine, Golubka did not return to Ukraine within the permitted timeframe after competing abroad and was placed on the Ukrainian sports ministry's list of athletes who failed to return. In 2025, he transferred his chess federation to Canada.

== Results ==
| Year | City | Tournament | + | − | = | Score | Place |
|---|---|---|---|---|---|---|---|
| 2003 | Simferopol | 72nd Ukrainian Chess Championship | 1 | 4 | 4 | 3/9 | 89th |
| 2009 | Alushta | 78th Ukrainian Chess Championship | 4 | 0 | 5 | 6½/9 | 6th |
| 2010 | Alushta | 79th Ukrainian Chess Championship | 4 | 2 | 3 | 5½/9 | 22nd |
| 2017 | Zhytomyr | 86th Ukrainian Chess Championship | 5 | 0 | 6 | 8/11 | 1st |
| 2018 | Kyiv | 87th Ukrainian Chess Championship | 2 | 3 | 4 | 4/9 | 8th |
| 2019 | Lutsk | 88th Ukrainian Chess Championship | 1 | 5 | 3 | 2½/9 | 10th |
| 2020 | Omelnyk | 89th Ukrainian Chess Championship | 4 | 4 | 1 | 4½/9 | 22nd |
