= Belo Brdo mine =

Lead and zinc mine in Kosovo

- Location within Kosovo

Location
- Location: Leposavić, District of Mitrovica, Kosovo; 43.2347°N 20.8213°E

Production
- Products: Lead, zinc, silver

Owner
- Company: State owned

The Belo Brdo mine is one of the largest lead and zinc mines in Kosovo. The mine is located in Leposavić. The mine has reserves amounting to 1.34 million tonnes of ore grading 6.59% lead, 5.74% zinc and 97.4 g/t silver, thus resulting in 88,300 tonnes of lead, 77,000 tonnes of zinc and 131 tonnes of silver.

== Geography and geology ==
The Belo Brdo mine is situated in the central part of Kopaonik mountain in northern Kosovo, positioned below the mountain peak Vojetin (elevation 1561 m) and approximately 3.5 km southeast of Suvo Rudište (elevation 2017 m). It lies within one of Serbia's historically significant mining regions, where numerous mineral occurrences and deposits of lead, zinc, iron, and copper are found throughout the Kopaonik massif.

The mine is primarily formed in reef limestone with partial formation in Triassic sediments. The ore bodies are typically located at the contact points between limestone and Triassic sediments, appearing in characteristic formations of lenses and steep columns. These ore bodies vary in surface area from 100 to 2,000 m^{2}.

The mineralogical composition includes several economically valuable minerals. The most significant ore minerals found in the deposit are sphalerite (zinc sulphide), galena (lead sulphide), pyrite (iron sulphide), arsenopyrite (in smaller quantities), siderite (iron carbonate), rhodochrosite (manganese carbonate), and native gold.

== History ==
The mining area around Belo Brdo has a rich historical legacy dating back to pre-Christian times. The region gained particular prominence during the medieval Serbian state under the Nemanjić dynasty, whose power was substantially based on the developed mining and metallurgy industries in this region. Evidence of extensive historical mining activity is visible around several locations in the vicinity, including Caričina reka, Vojetin, Kamenica, Belo Brdo, Marušić, and Zaplanina. These historical workings testify to centuries of mining operations in the area.

The modern history of the mine began in the 1920s when the British company Selection Trust became interested in mining concessions in the region. Nikola Pašić, a prominent Serbian politician, owned the mining privilege for this area until the British company purchased it. Following this acquisition, the British established Kopaonik Mines Limited to manage their new concession. Exploratory work began in 1927 and was completed by 1934. These investigations identified approximately 614,000 tonnes of ore with average metal content of 8.9% lead, 6.3% zinc, and 120 grams per ton of silver.

Formal mine development commenced in 1936 from an elevation of 984 metres with the construction of an adit (horizontal passage) extending 2,710 metres. This engineering project was completed in just 13.5 months—by February 1937—which was considered a remarkable achievement for the time. The monthly progress of the adit construction ranged from 118 metres to as much as 295 metres, demonstrating the technical capabilities and efficiency of the operation.

To support mining operations, the British company invested in modern infrastructure. An aerial tramway stretching 10.5 kilometres was constructed to transport ore from the mine to the railway station in Lešak, from where it was then taken to the flotation facility in Zvečan. Additionally, a hydroelectric power plant was built in Belo Brdo to supply electricity to the mining operations.

The mine began commercial operations in 1937 but faced disruptions during World War II. In 1941, the German company Mansfeld A.G. from Eisleben took control of the mine from the British. However, operations were short-lived as resistance fighters disabled the mine and destroyed the power station, forcing the suspension of production.

Following World War II, mining operations were restored in the Belo Brdo area. A new corporate entity was established under the name "Work Organization Rudnici and Kopaonik flotation", which incorporated multiple mines in the region: Belo Brdo, Jelakce, Žuta Prlina, Koporić, and Crnac, with administrative headquarters in Leposavić.

A significant development came in 1973 with the construction of a new flotation plant in Leposavić specifically designed to process ores from the Kopaonik mines, including Belo Brdo. This facility enhanced the processing capabilities for the mine's output. The Belo Brdo mine has continued operations with varying levels of activity into the modern era, making it one of the longest continuously operated mines in the region despite experiencing periodic interruptions.
