= Limovce =

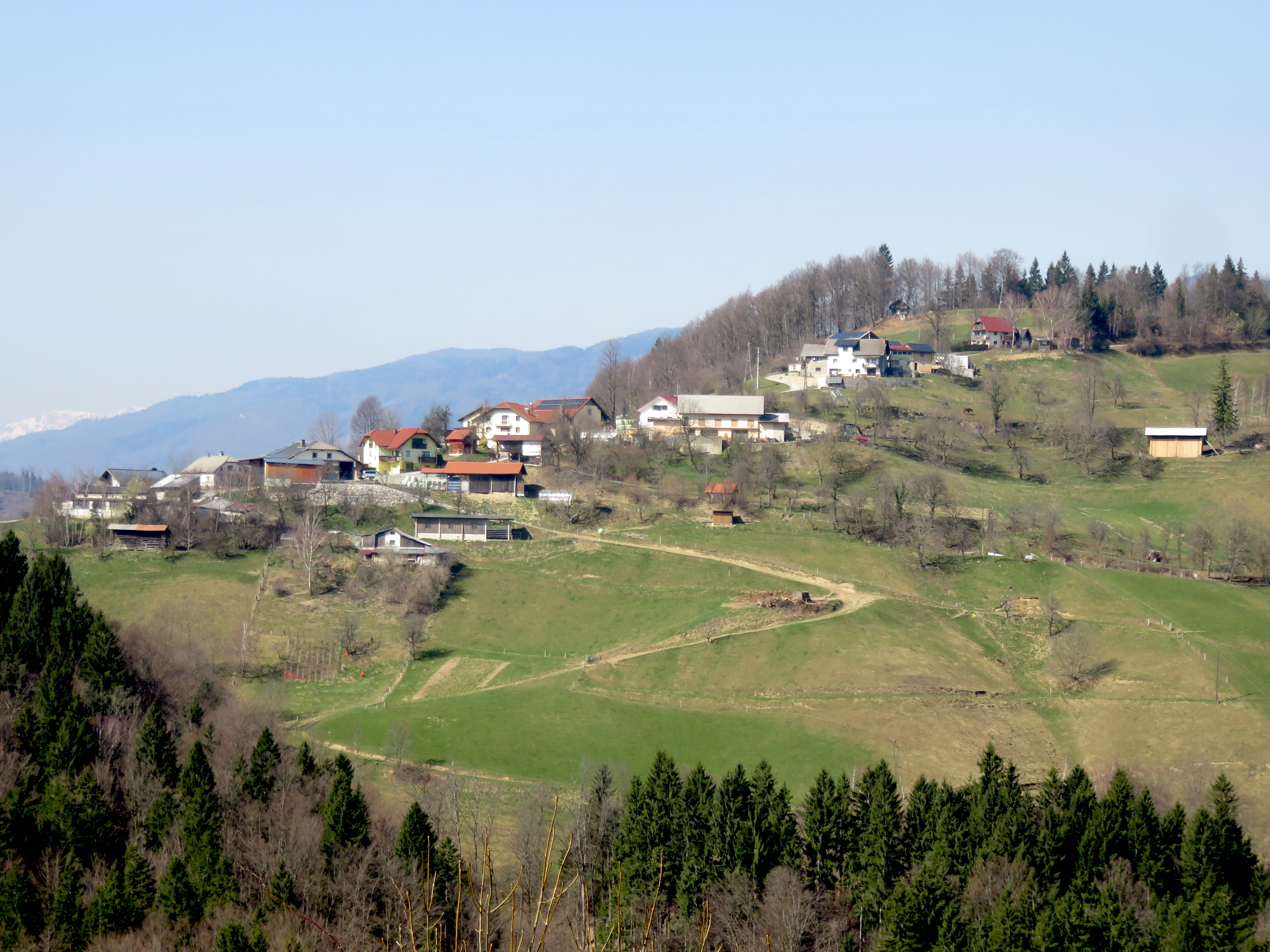

- Location in Slovenia
- Coordinates: 46°11′45.06″N 14°55′21.54″E
- Country: Slovenia
- Traditional region: Styria
- Statistical region: Savinja
- Municipality: Vransko

Area
  - Total: 2.44 km^{2} (0.94 sq mi)
- Elevation: 712.8 m (2,339 ft)

Population (2002)
  - Total: 77

Limovce (pronounced [liˈmoːu̯tsɛ]) is a small settlement in the Municipality of Vransko in central Slovenia. It lies in the hills south of Vransko. The area is part of the traditional region of Styria. The Municipality of Vransko is now included in the Savinja Statistical Region.
