= Municipality of Vransko =

Municipality of Slovenia

Municipality of Vransko Občina Vransko
- Municipality
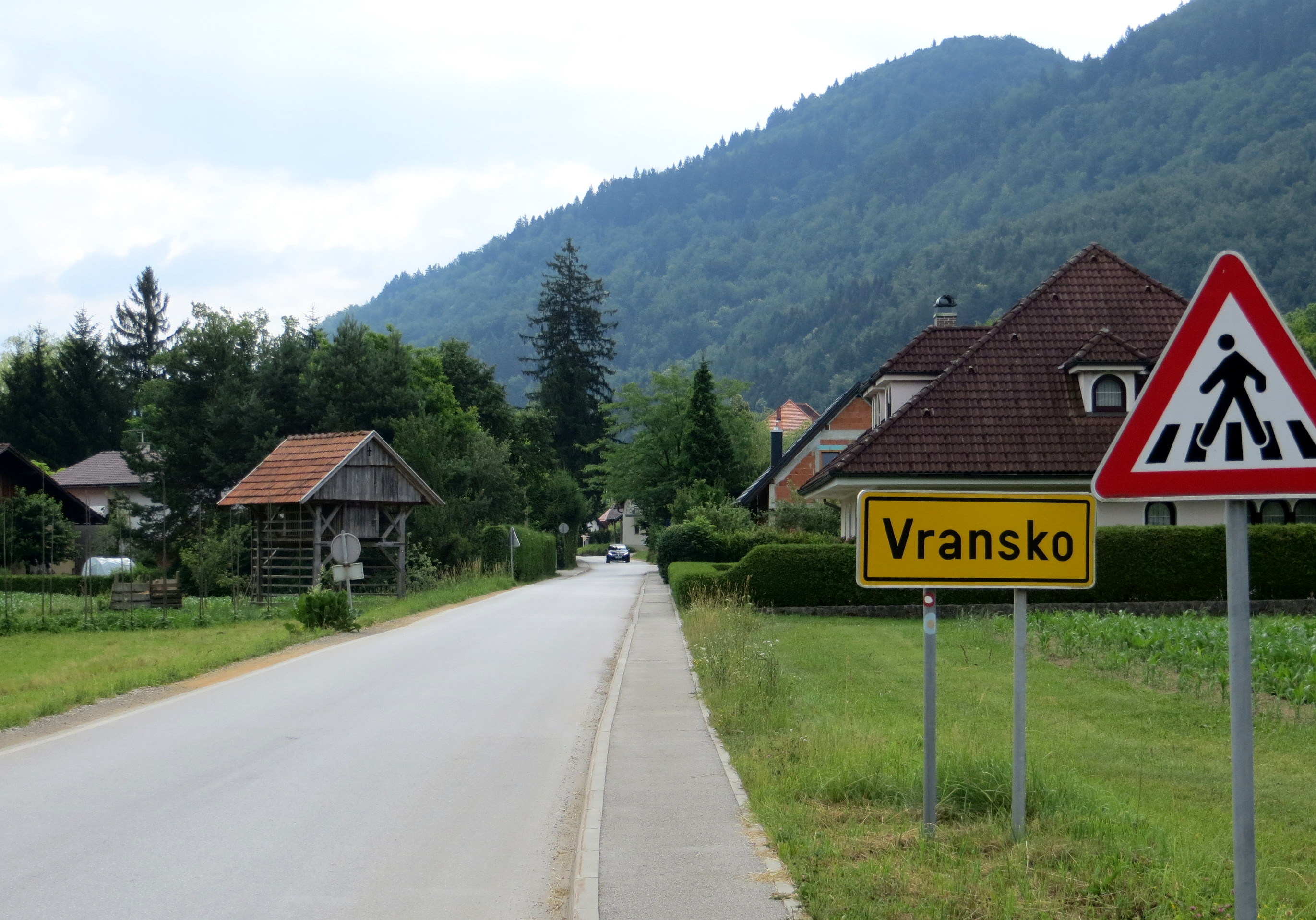

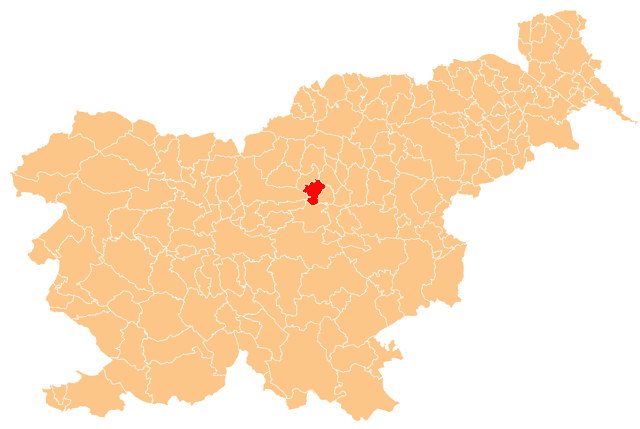
- Location of the Municipality of Vransko in Slovenia
- Coordinates: 46°14′N 14°57′E
- Country: Slovenia

Government
  - Mayor: Nataša Juhart

Area
  - Total: 53.3 km^{2} (20.6 sq mi)

Population (July 1, 2018)
  - Total: 2,609
  - Density: 48.9/km^{2} (127/sq mi)
- Time zone: UTC+01 (CET)
  - Summer (DST): UTC+02 (CEST)
- Website: www.vransko.si

The Municipality of Vransko (pronounced [ˈwɾaːnskɔ]; Slovene: Občina Vransko) is a municipality in the traditional region of Styria in northeastern Slovenia. The seat of the municipality is the town of Vransko. Vransko became a municipality in 1998.

== Settlements ==
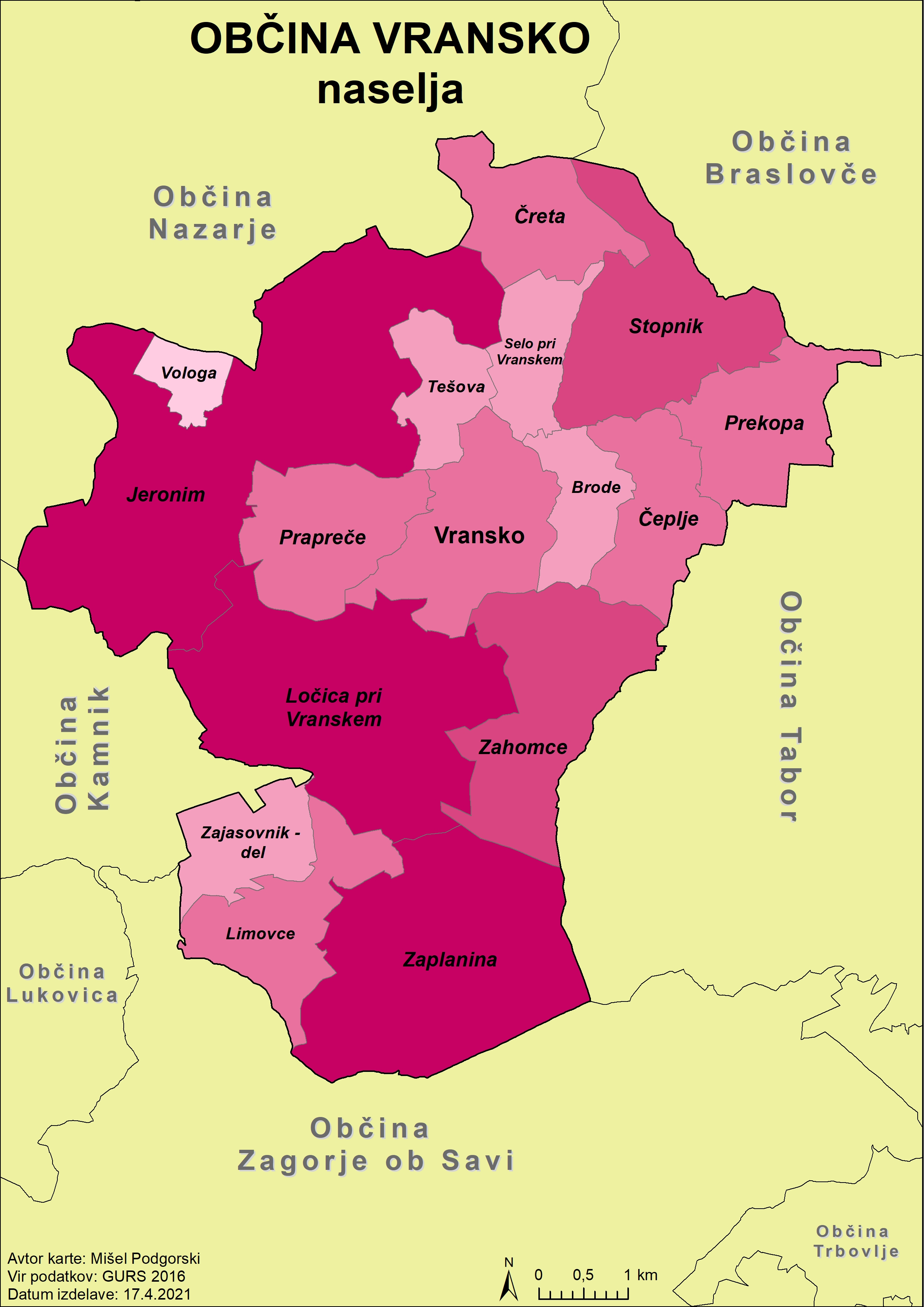
Villages in the municipality

In addition to the municipal seat of Vransko, the municipality also includes the following settlements:

- Brode
- Čeplje
- Čreta
- Jeronim
- Limovce
- Ločica pri Vranskem
- Prapreče
- Prekopa
- Selo pri Vranskem
- Stopnik
- Tešova
- Vologa
- Zahomce
- Zajasovnik
- Zaplanina
