= Čreta, Vransko =

Čreta Marija-Čreta (until 1952)
- Location in Slovenia
- Coordinates: 46°16′42.13″N 14°57′3.44″E
- Country: Slovenia
- Traditional region: Styria
- Statistical region: Savinja
- Municipality: Vransko

Area
  - Total: 2.2 km^{2} (0.85 sq mi)
- Elevation: 896.3 m (2,941 ft)

Population (2002)
  - Total: 18

Čreta (pronounced [ˈtʃɾeːta]) is a small settlement in the Municipality of Vransko in central Slovenia. It lies in the hills north of Vransko. The area is part of the traditional region of Styria. The municipality is now included in the Savinja Statistical Region.

== Name ==
The name of the settlement was changed from Marija-Čreta (literally, 'Our Lady of Čreta') to Čreta in 1952. The name was changed on the basis of the 1948 Law on Names of Settlements and Designations of Squares, Streets, and Buildings as part of efforts by Slovenia's postwar communist government to remove religious elements from toponyms.

== Churches ==
There are two churches in the settlement. One is dedicated to the Virgin Mary and dates to the 15th century with 16th- and 18th-century extensions. The second is dedicated to Saint Catherine of Alexandria and was built in the 15th century.
