= Selo pri Vranskem =

- Location in Slovenia
- Coordinates: 46°15′20.2″N 14°57′36.19″E
- Country: Slovenia
- Traditional region: Styria
- Statistical region: Savinja
- Municipality: Vransko

Area
  - Total: 1.4 km^{2} (0.54 sq mi)
- Elevation: 360.3 m (1,182 ft)

Population (2002)
  - Total: 66

Selo pri Vranskem (pronounced [ˈsɛːlɔ pri ˈwɾaːnskɛm]) is a small settlement in the Municipality of Vransko in central Slovenia. It lies in the hills north of Brode. The area is part of the traditional region of Styria. The entire Municipality of Vransko is now included in the Savinja Statistical Region.

== Name ==
The name of the settlement was changed from Selo to Selo pri Vranskem in 1953.
