= Jeronim, Vransko =

Jeronim Sveti Jeronim (until 1955)
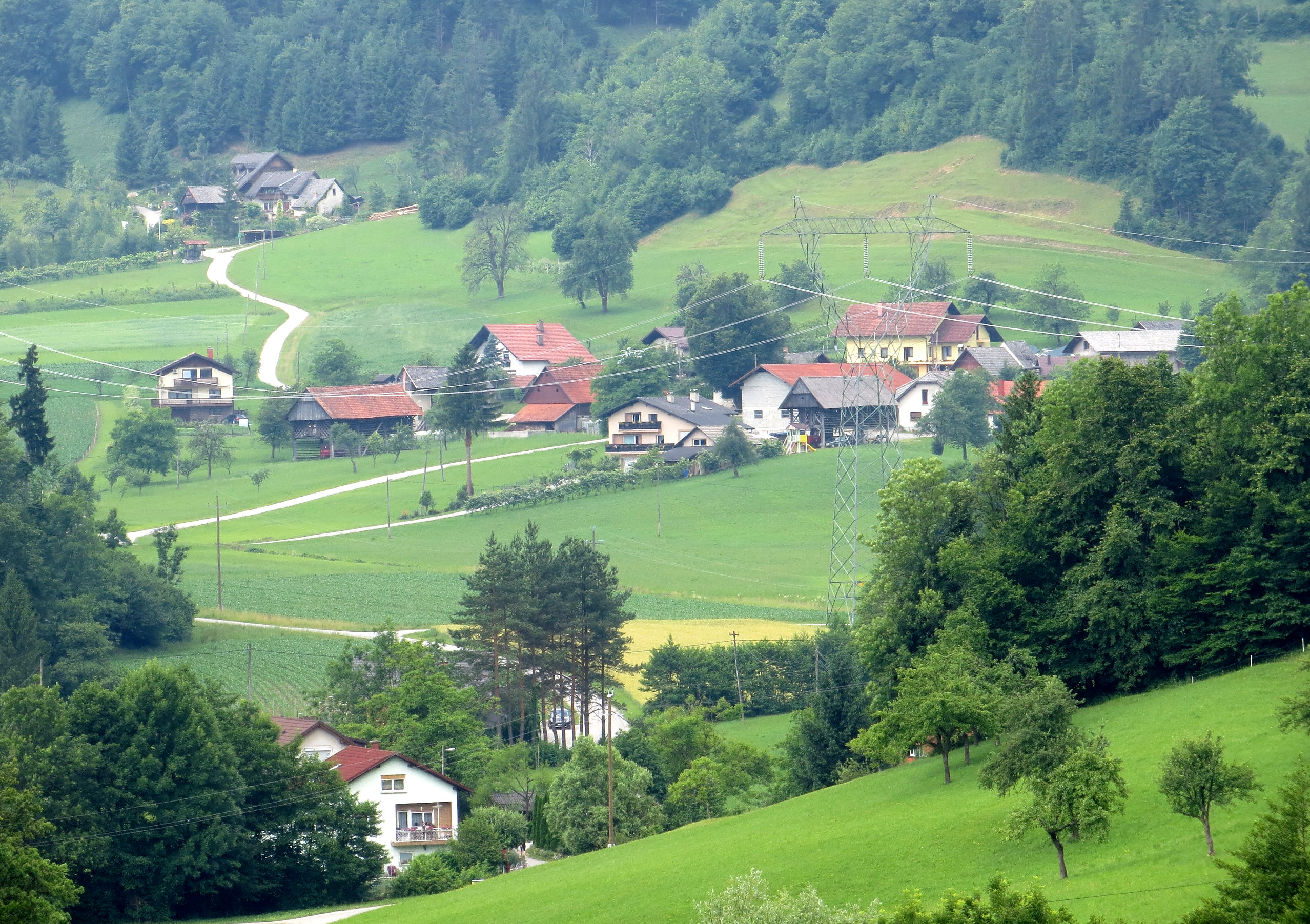

- Location in Slovenia
- Coordinates: 46°14′34.1″N 14°54′36.96″E
- Country: Slovenia
- Traditional region: Styria
- Statistical region: Savinja
- Municipality: Vransko

Area
  - Total: 10.96 km^{2} (4.23 sq mi)
- Elevation: 410.3 m (1,346 ft)

Population (2002)
  - Total: 211

Jeronim (pronounced [jɛˈɾoːnim]) is a dispersed settlement in the Municipality of Vransko in central Slovenia. It lies in the hills north and west of Vransko. The area is part of the traditional region of Lower Styria. The municipality is now included in the Savinja Statistical Region.

== Name ==
The name of the settlement was changed from Sveti Jeronim (literally, 'Saint Jerome') to Jeronim (literally, 'Jerome') in 1955. The name was changed on the basis of the 1948 Law on Names of Settlements and Designations of Squares, Streets, and Buildings as part of efforts by Slovenia's postwar communist government to remove religious elements from toponyms.

== Church ==
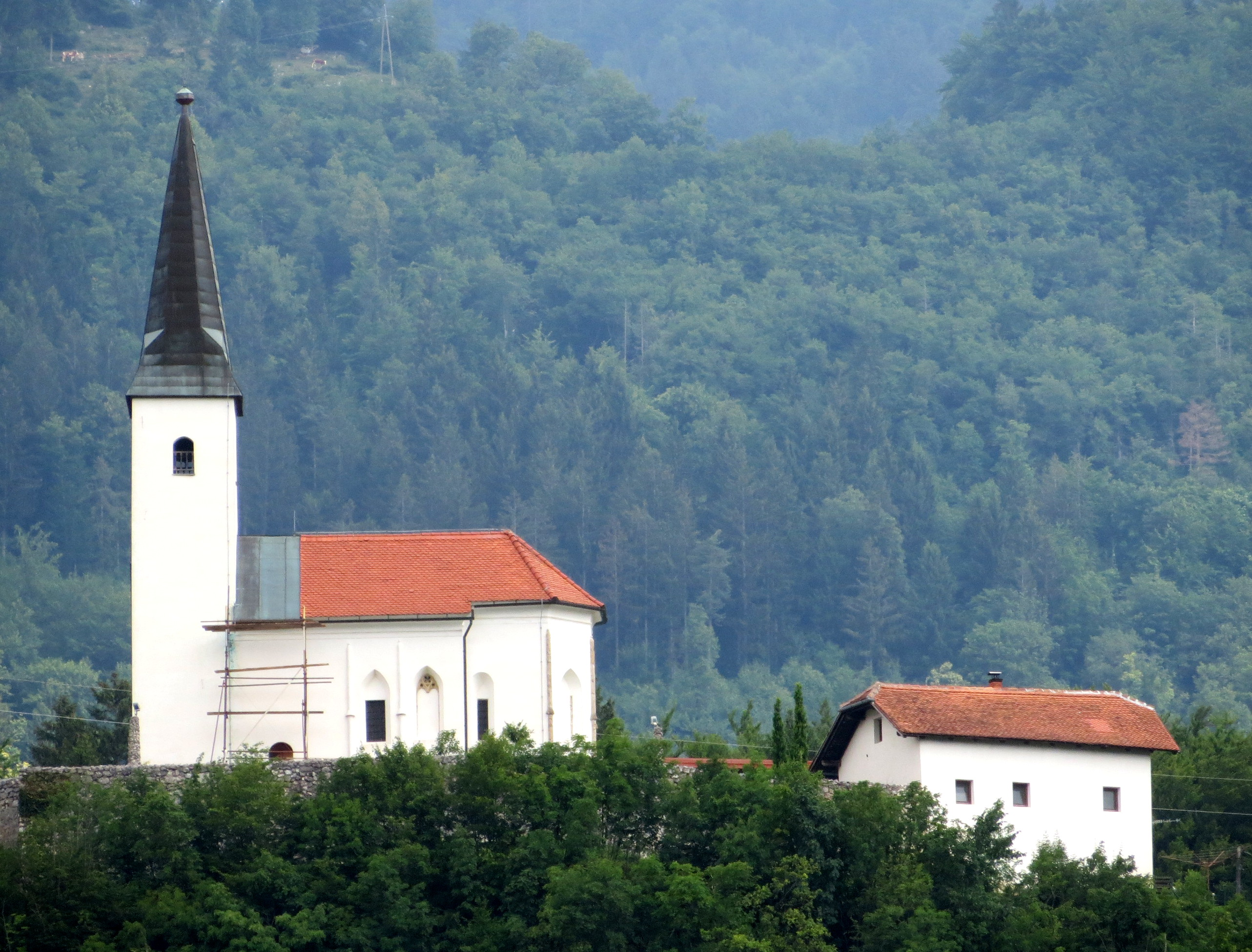
Saint Jerome's Church

The local church from which the settlement gets its name is dedicated to Saint Jerome (Slovene: sveti Jeronim) and belongs to the Parish of Vransko. It is an early 15th-century building and parts of the walled enclosure built in defence against Ottoman raids still survive. The nave was extended and the belfry rebuilt in the 18th century.
