= Zajasovnik =

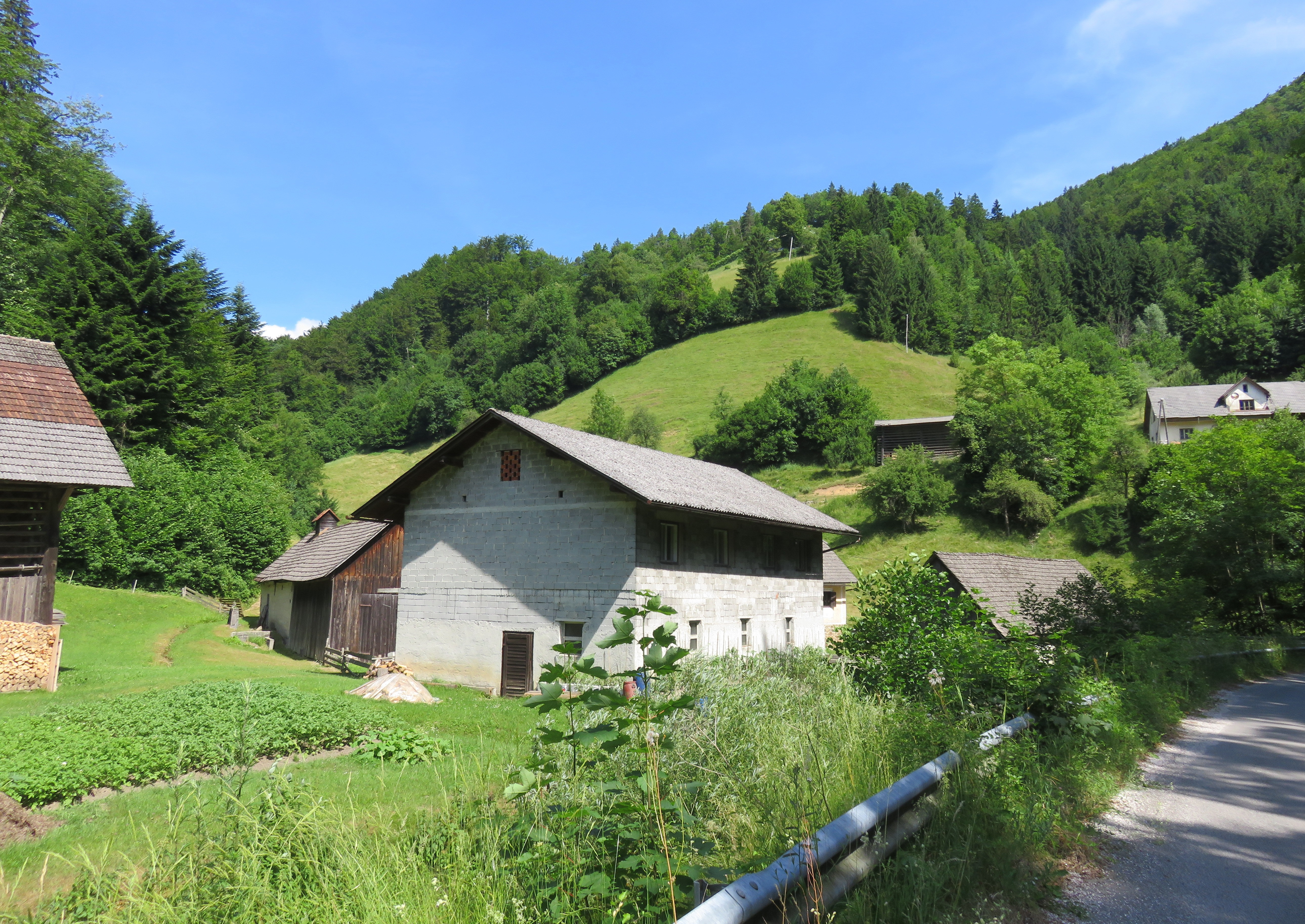

- Location in Slovenia
- Coordinates: 46°12′31″N 14°54′8.23″E
- Country: Slovenia
- Traditional region: Upper Carniola, Styria
- Statistical region: Central Slovenia
- Municipality: Kamnik, Vransko

Area
  - Total: 3.08 km^{2} (1.19 sq mi)
- Elevation: 541.4 m (1,776 ft)

Population (2002)
  - Total: 77

Zajasovnik (pronounced [zaˈjaːsɔu̯nik]) is a dispersed settlement that is divided between the municipalities of Kamnik and Vransko in Slovenia.

== Cultural heritage ==
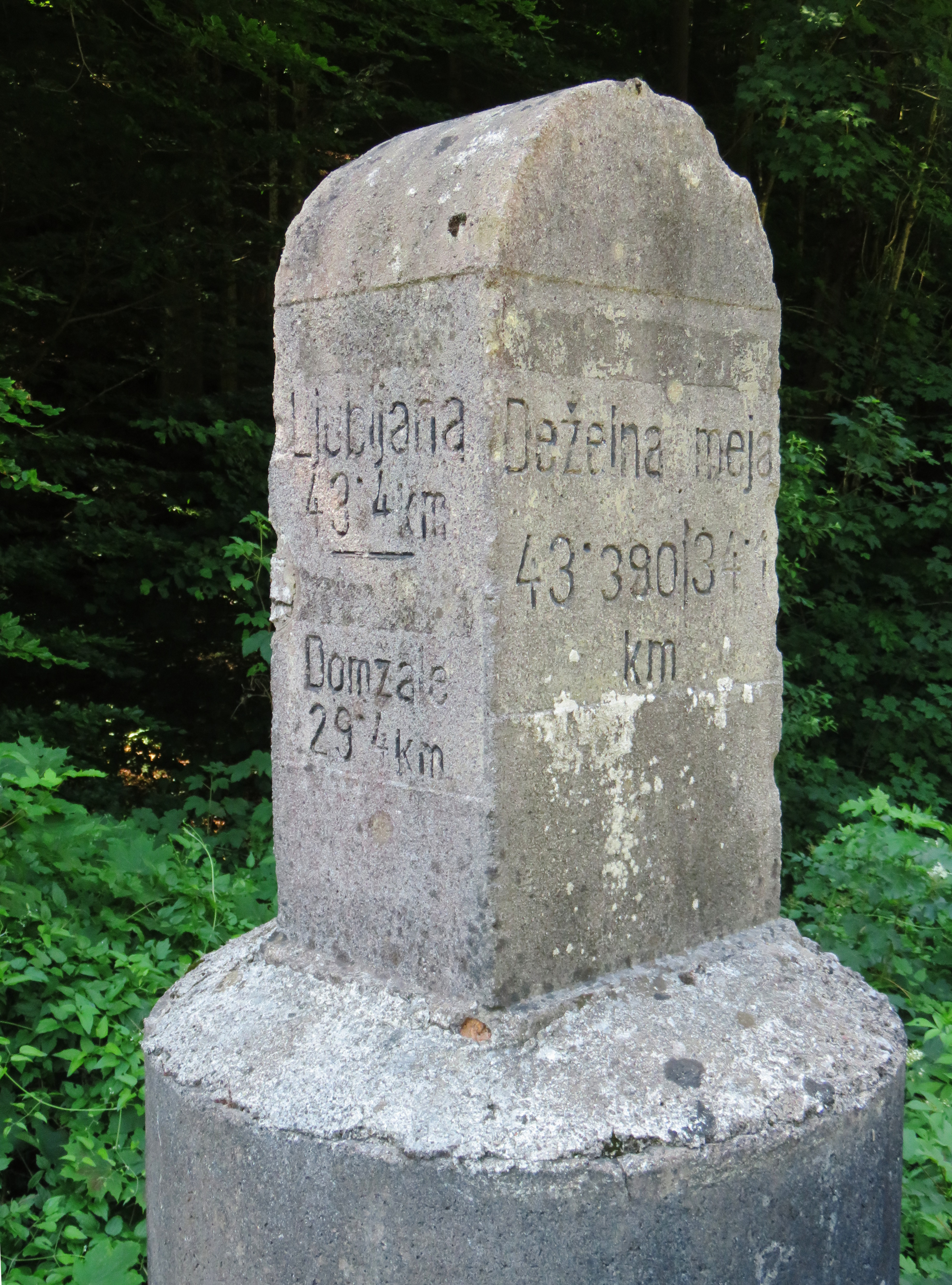
Austro-Hungarian boundary stone

An Austro-Hungarian boundary stone marking the border between Carniola and Styria stands at the border between the two parts of Zajasovnik.
