= Vologa =

Place in Styria, Slovenia

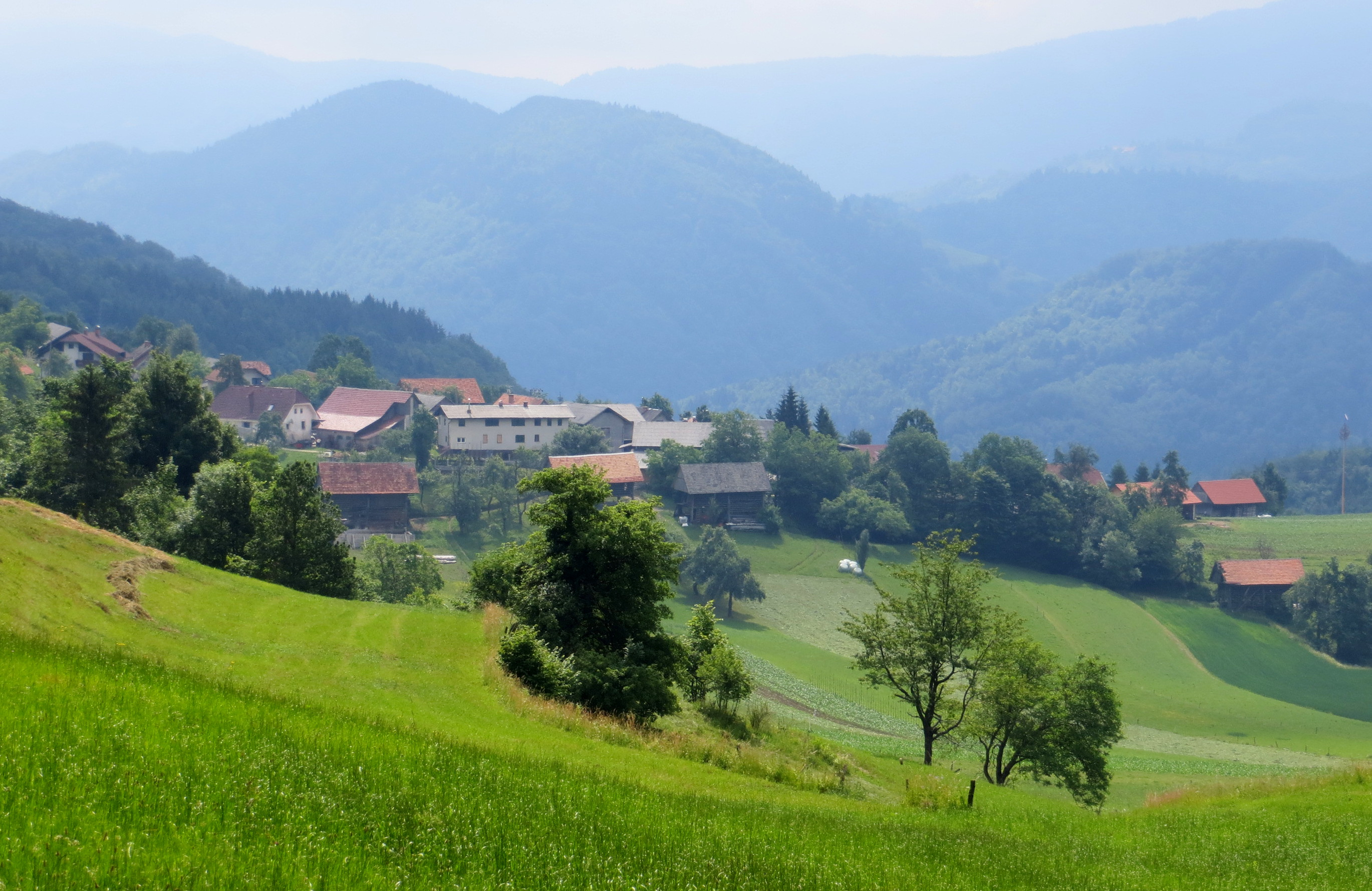

- Location in Slovenia
- Coordinates: 46°15′14.27″N 14°54′40.63″E
- Country: Slovenia
- Traditional region: Styria
- Statistical region: Savinja
- Municipality: Vransko

Area
  - Total: 0.65 km^{2} (0.25 sq mi)
- Elevation: 596.9 m (1,958 ft)

Population (2002)
  - Total: 45

Vologa (pronounced [ˈʋoːlɔɡa]) is a small village in the Municipality of Vransko in central Slovenia. It lies in the hills northwest of Vransko. The area is part of the traditional region of Styria and is now included in the Savinja Statistical Region.

The village chapel-shrine dates to the first half of the 19th century.
