= Omelnyk, Poltava Oblast =

Omelnyk Омельник
- Village
- Village council building in Omelnyk

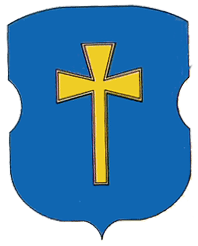
- Flag Coat of arms

- Location of Omelnyk in Poltava Oblast Omelnyk (Ukraine)
- Coordinates: 49°12′32″N 33°32′49″E
- Country: Ukraine
- Oblast: Poltava Oblast
- Raion: Kremenchuk Raion
- Hromada: Omelnyk rural hromada
- Founded: 1630s
- Elevation: 68 m (223 ft)
- Postal code: 39713
- Area code: +380 536
- Website: omelnikotg.gov.ua

Omelnyk (Ukrainian: Омельник) is a village in Kremenchuk Raion, Poltava Oblast, central Ukraine. It serves as the administrative center of Omelnyk rural hromada, one of the hromadas of Ukraine.

In 2020, the hromada had a population of approximately 5,000 inhabitants, of whom just under 2,000 lived in the village of Omelnyk itself and the remainder across nineteen subordinate villages. The municipality was established in 2015 through the merger of the rural councils of Omelnyk, Demydivka, Zapsillia, and Rokytne. In addition to those four settlements, the hromada encompasses the villages of Hunky, Kovali, Naidenivka, Radochyny, Shcherbukhy, Yaremivka, Kramarenky, Stepivka, Varakuty, Lytvynenky, Pustovyty, Fedorenky, Onyshchenky, Piatykhatky, Romanky, and Shcherbaky.

Omelnyk is located about 20 km (12 mi) north-northeast of the district capital Kremenchuk, near the confluence of the Omelnyk and Psel rivers.

== History ==
The settlement is documented as existing since the 1630s, originally as a fortified miasteczko. In 1648, during the Khmelnytsky Uprising, Omelnyk became the seat of a sotnia within the Cossack Chyhyryn Regiment. Following the Truce of Andrusovo in 1667, it came under the control of Hetman Petro Doroshenko. After Doroshenko's surrender in 1676, it was transferred to the Myrhorod Regiment, where it remained for a century.

Under the Russian Empire, Omelnyk was incorporated into Kremenchugsky Uyezd of Poltava Governorate, becoming the administrative center of its own volost around 1900. During the Ukrainian SSR period, its status was downgraded from a miasteczko to a village. Prior to the 2015 administrative reform, Omelnyk was the center of a rural council that included only the villages of Varakuty, Lytvynenky, Pustovyty, and Fedorenky.
