= Selo pri Radohovi Vasi =

Selo pri Radohovi Vasi Selo pri Svetem Pavlu (until 1955)
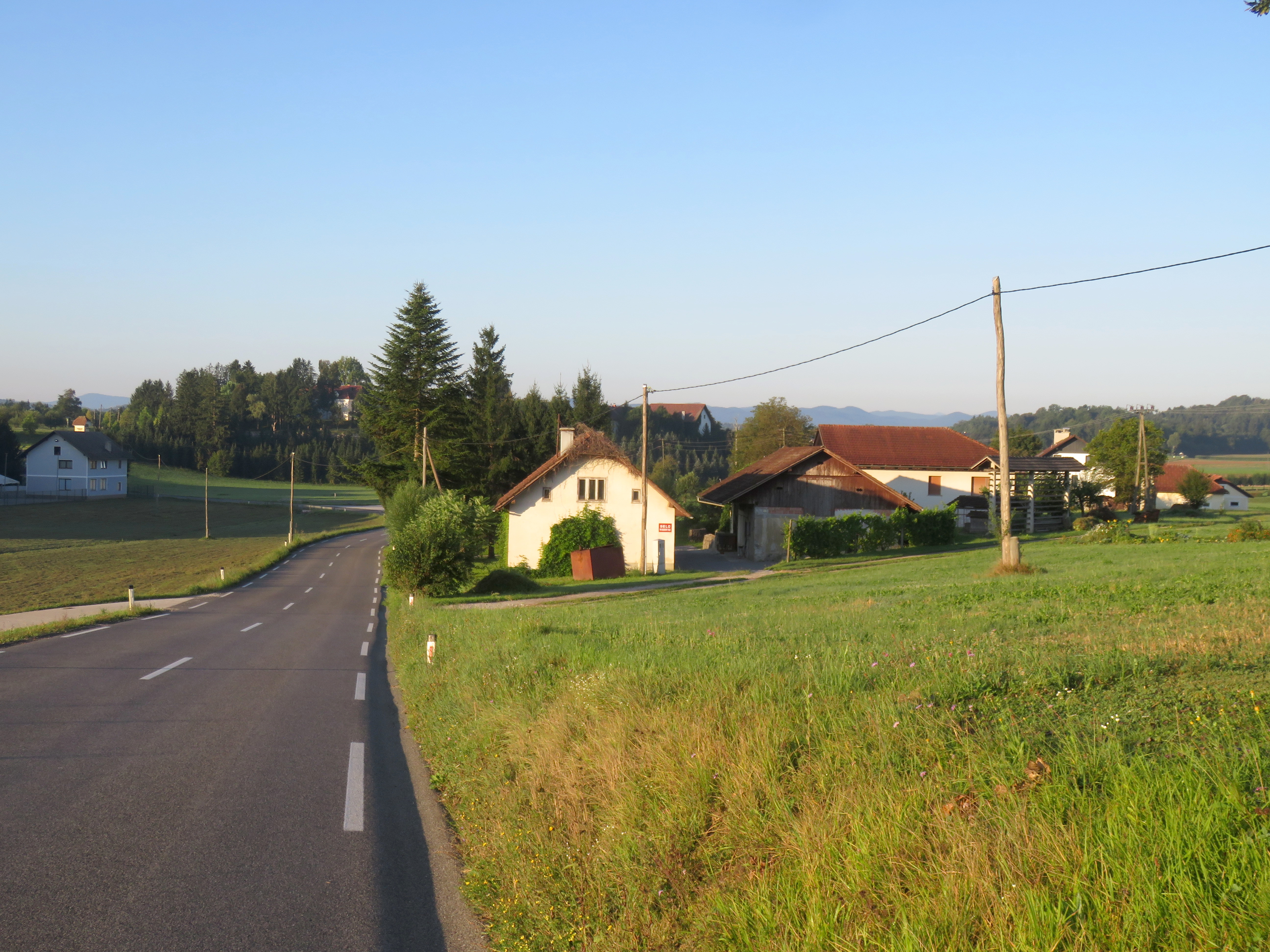

- Location in Slovenia
- Coordinates: 45°57′18.1″N 14°52′22.06″E
- Country: Slovenia
- Traditional region: Lower Carniola
- Statistical region: Central Slovenia
- Municipality: Ivančna Gorica

Area
  - Total: 0.76 km^{2} (0.29 sq mi)
- Elevation: 327 m (1,073 ft)

Population (2002)
  - Total: 38

Selo pri Radohovi Vasi (pronounced [ˈsɛːlɔ pɾi ˈɾaːdɔxɔʋi ˈʋaːsi]; Slovene: Selo pri Radohovi vasi, German: Selo bei Sankt Paul) is a small settlement north of Radohova Vas in the Municipality of Ivančna Gorica in central Slovenia. The entire area is part of the historical region of Lower Carniola and the municipality is now included in the Central Slovenia Statistical Region.

== Name ==
The name of the settlement was changed from Selo pri Svetem Pavlu (literally, 'Selo near Saint Paul') to Sela pri Radohovi Vasi (literally, 'Sela near Radohova Vas') in 1955. The name was changed on the basis of the 1948 Law on Names of Settlements and Designations of Squares, Streets, and Buildings as part of efforts by Slovenia's postwar communist government to remove religious elements from toponyms.
