= Prapreče, Vransko =

Prapreče
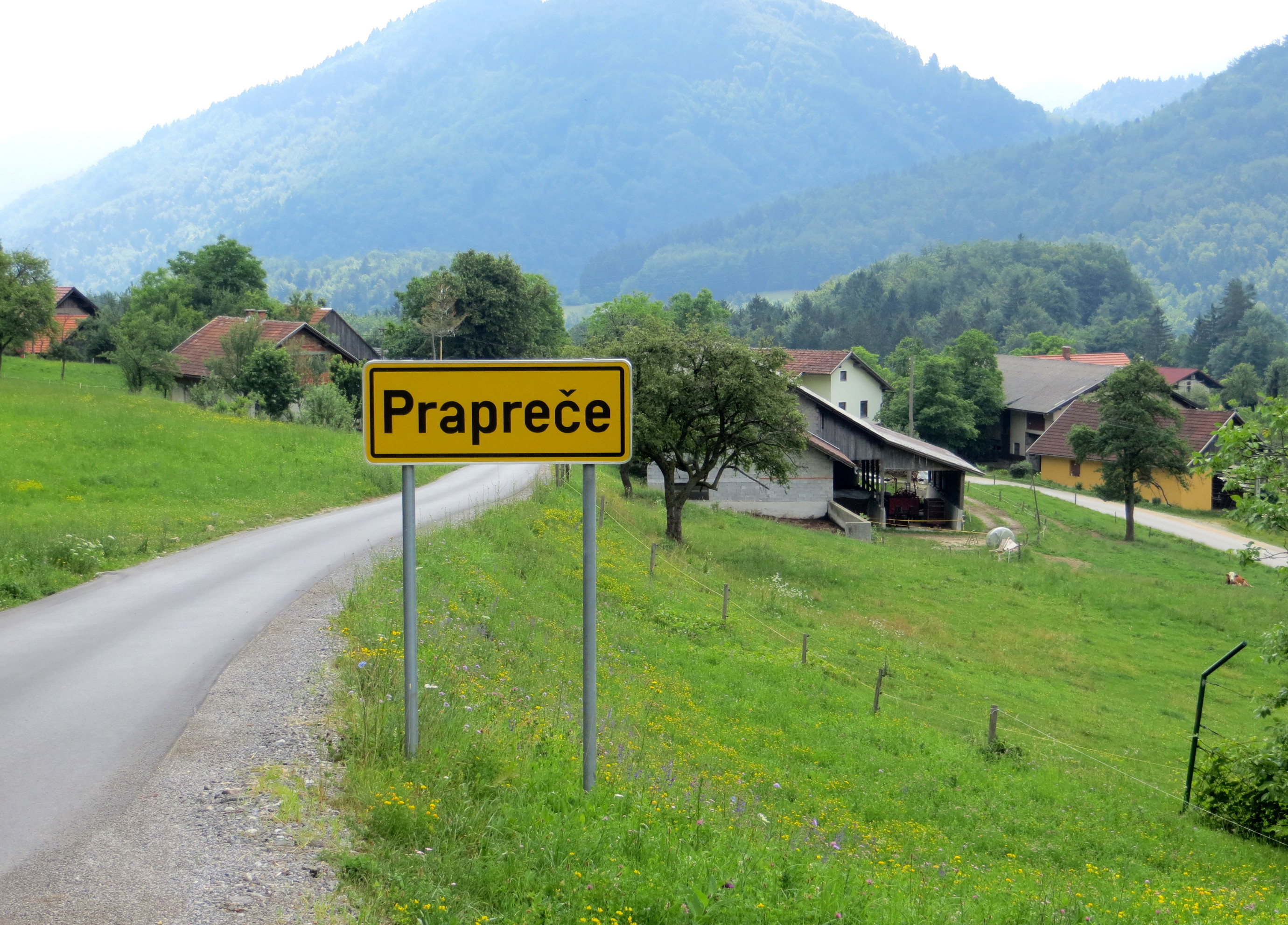

- Location in Slovenia
- Coordinates: 46°14′41.92″N 14°55′41.37″E
- Country: Slovenia
- Traditional region: Styria
- Statistical region: Savinja
- Municipality: Vransko

Area
  - Total: 2.69 km^{2} (1.04 sq mi)
- Elevation: 404.7 m (1,328 ft)

Population (2002)
  - Total: 142

Prapreče (pronounced [ˈpraːpɾɛtʃɛ]) is a settlement in the Municipality of Vransko in central Slovenia. It lies in the valley of Merinščica Creek west of Vransko. The area is part of the traditional Styria region. Together with the municipality, Prapreče is now part of the Savinja Statistical Region.
