= Stopnik, Vransko =

Stopnik
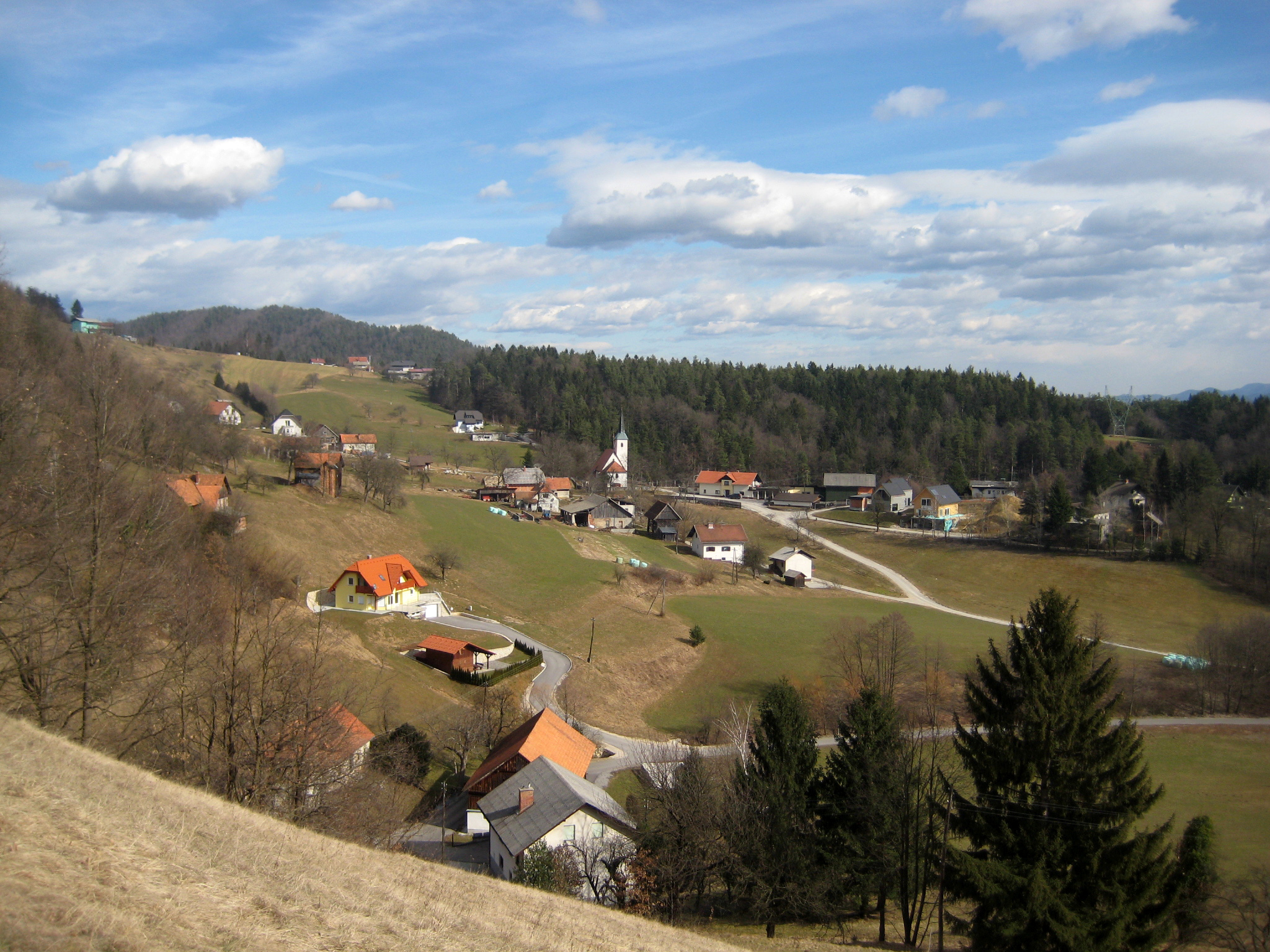

- Location in Slovenia
- Coordinates: 46°15′31.55″N 14°58′57.44″E
- Country: Slovenia
- Traditional region: Styria
- Statistical region: Savinja
- Municipality: Vransko

Area
  - Total: 3.86 km^{2} (1.49 sq mi)
- Elevation: 355.8 m (1,167 ft)

Population (2002)
  - Total: 174

Stopnik (pronounced [ˈstoːpnik]) is a settlement in the Municipality of Vransko in central Slovenia. The area is part of the traditional region of Styria. The municipality is now included in the Savinja Statistical Region.

The local church is dedicated to Saints Hermagoras and Fortunatus and belongs to the Parish of Vransko. It dates to the 15th century with some 17th- and 19th-century rebuilding.

To the west of the settlement are also the ruins of Stopnik Castle, first mentioned in the 12th century and abandoned around 1800.
