= Brode, Vransko =

Brode Tržca (until 1955)
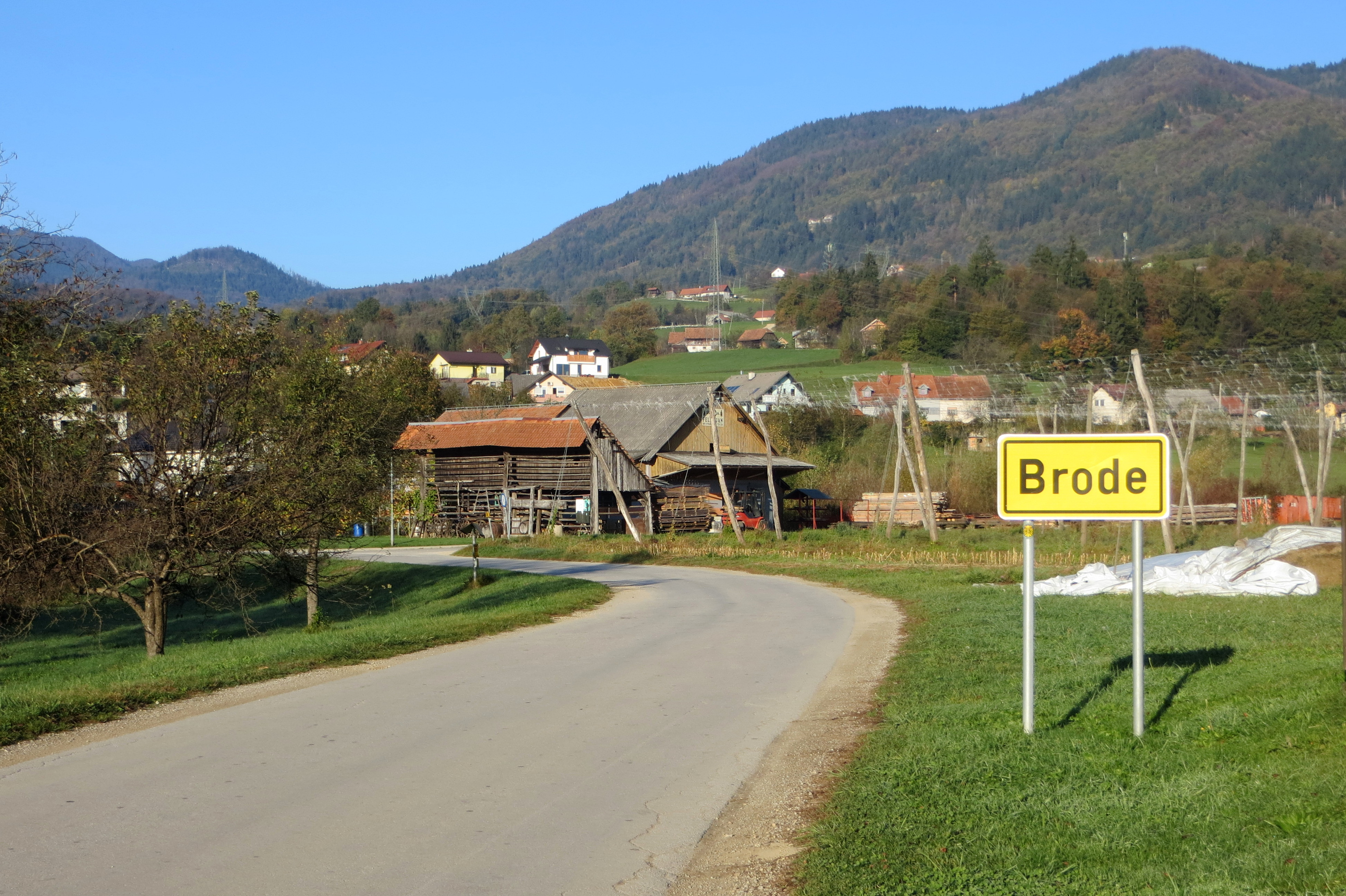

- Location in Slovenia
- Coordinates: 46°14′54.29″N 14°57′54.89″E
- Country: Slovenia
- Traditional region: Styria
- Statistical region: Savinja
- Municipality: Vransko

Area
  - Total: 1.29 km^{2} (0.50 sq mi)
- Elevation: 329.8 m (1,082 ft)

Population (2002)
  - Total: 195

Brode (pronounced [bɾɔˈdeː]) is a settlement in the Municipality of Vransko in central Slovenia. The area is part of the traditional region of Styria. The municipality is now included in the Savinja Statistical Region. The settlement includes the hamlets of Gaberšek and Tržica (or Tršca).

== Name ==
The name of the settlement was changed from Tržca to Brode in 1955. Until 1955, the name Brode referred to a hamlet of Tržca.
