= Zgornja Slivnica =

Zgornja Slivnica Selo (former name)
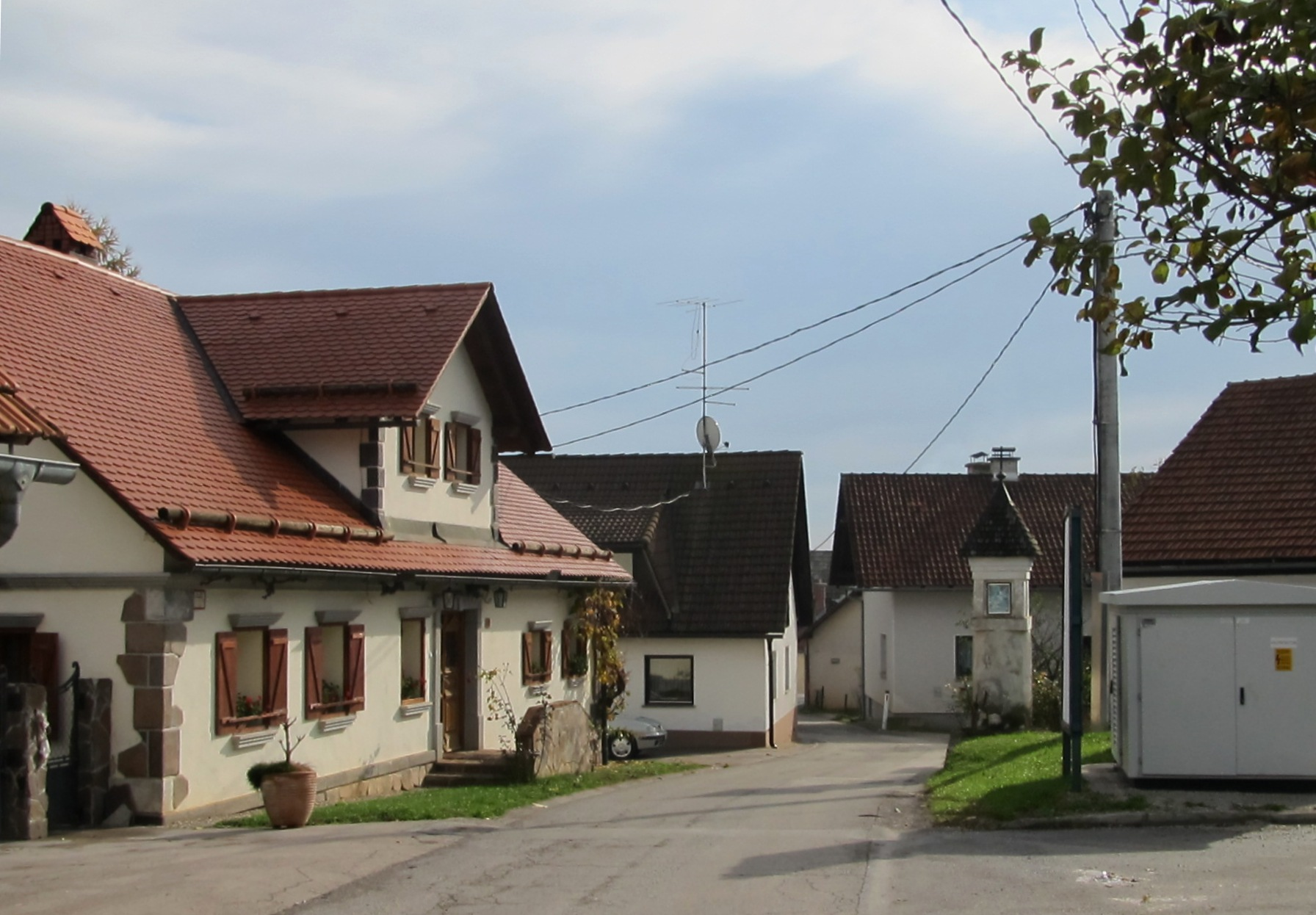
- Zgornja Slivnica

- Location in Slovenia
- Coordinates: 45°59′2.61″N 14°38′33.35″E
- Country: Slovenia
- Traditional region: Lower Carniola
- Statistical region: Central Slovenia
- Municipality: Grosuplje

Area
  - Total: 2.3 km^{2} (0.89 sq mi)
- Elevation: 468.8 m (1,538 ft)

Population (2002)
  - Total: 94

Zgornja Slivnica (pronounced [ˈzɡóːɾnja ˈsliːwnitsa]; in older sources also Gorenja Slivnica, German: Oberschleinitz or Ober Schleinitz) is a settlement in the Municipality of Grosuplje in central Slovenia. It lies in the hills north of Grosuplje and northeast of Šmarje-Sap and south of Mali Lipoglav in the historical region of Lower Carniola. The municipality is now part of the Central Slovenia Statistical Region.

== Geography ==
Zgornja Slivnica is a clustered village on a plateau northeast of Mount Mary Magdalene (Slovene: Magdalenska gora). It is bordered to the northeast by Boršt Hill and the Ograja Valley, to the south by the Močile Valley, and to the northwest by the Šumnik Valley and Šumnik Creek.

== Name ==
Zgornja Slivnica was formerly known as Selo. The name Zgornja Slivnica literally means 'upper Slivnica', distinguishing it from Spodnja Slivnica 'lower Slivnica'. The name Slivnica and names like it (e.g., Slivnica pri Mariboru, Slivna, Slivno, Slivje) are derived from the Slovene common noun sliva 'plum (tree)', thus referring to the local vegetation. In the past the German name was Oberschleinitz.

== History ==
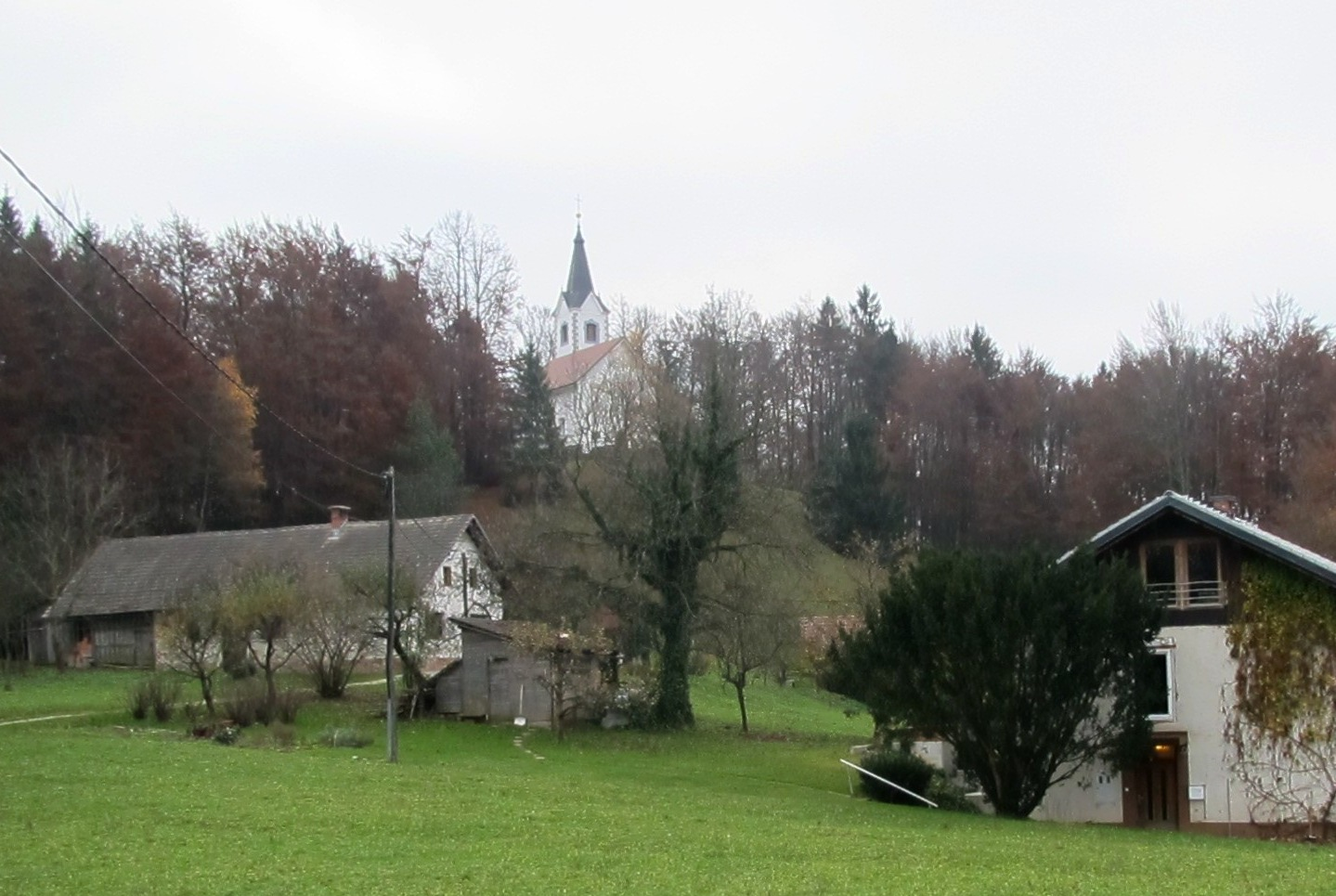
Mount Mary Magdalene

Mount Mary Magdalene, south of the settlement, is one of the largest and most important Hallstatt culture archaeological sites in Slovenia. There was a prehistoric fortification at the site and an extensive tumulus burial ground on the slope below it. The prehistoric settlement at the site was built on three artificially leveled terraces, with the highest terrace presumably reserved for a temple. The Hallstatt-era settlement lasted from approximately 700 BC to 300 BC, and was succeeded by a La Tène settlement that lasted until 35 BC.

The church on the hill was fortified as protection against Ottoman raids and was cited by the 17th-century historian Johann Weikhard von Valvasor as the last lookout and site for warning bonfires in Lower Carniola before Ljubljana. In the past, the site offered a considerably better view than today because the slopes of the hill were clear-cut.

Archaeological investigations at Mount Mary Magdalene were carried out by Karel Dežman, Ferdinand Schulz, Jernej Pečnik, and the Duchy of Mecklenburg. Finds from the site are kept in Vienna, at the National Museum in Ljubljana, and at Harvard University. One of the significant finds from the site is a decorated situla similar to the one found at Vače. The excavation of over 1,000 graves at and near the site indicates that Christianity was established very early.

== Religious heritage ==
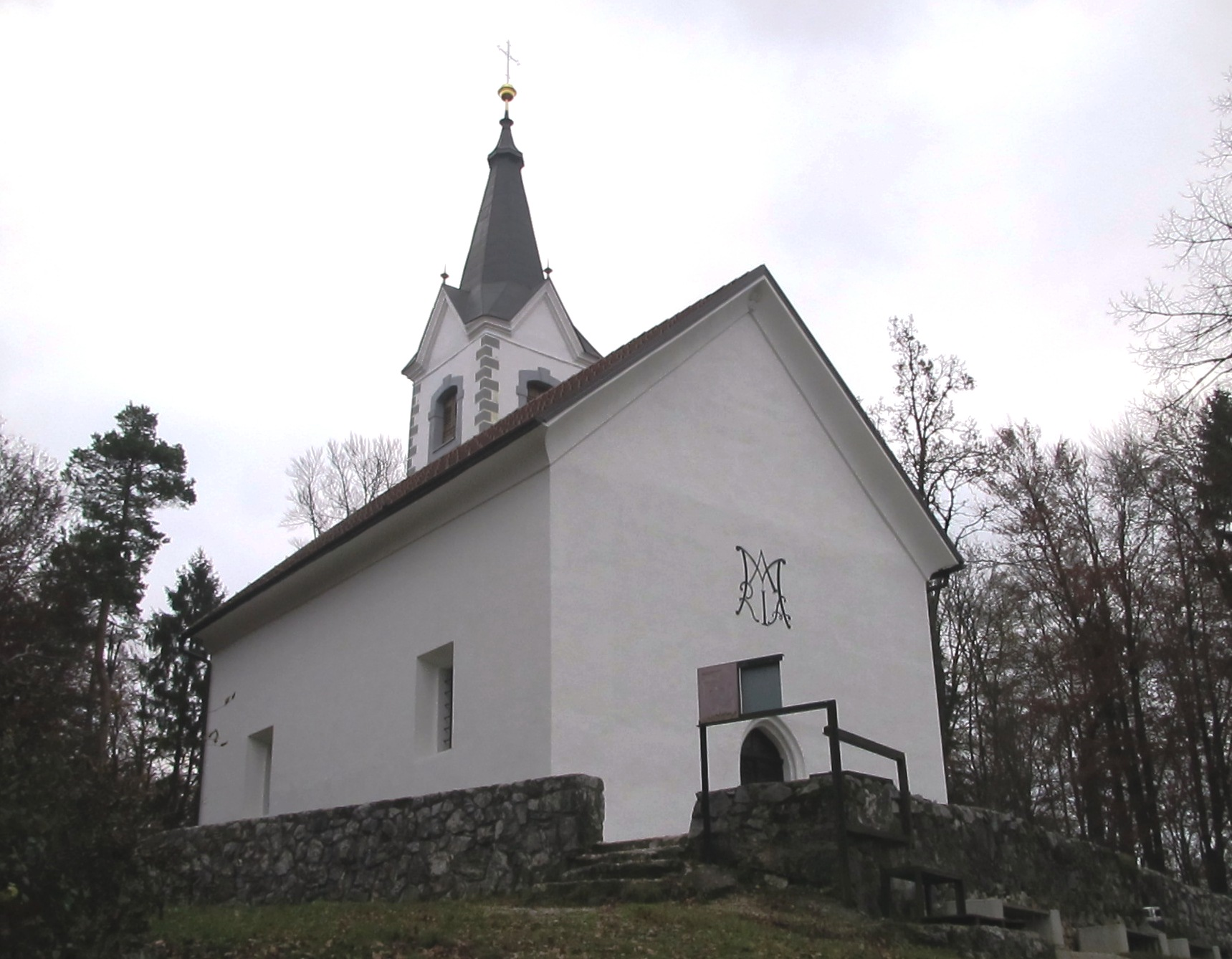
Saint Mary Magdalene Church in Zgornja Slivnica

The local church, built on Mount Saint Mary Magdalene, is dedicated to Saint Mary Magdalene and belongs to the Parish of Šmarje-Sap. In its core it is a 15th-century Gothic building that was restyled and vaulted in the late 17th century. The church is built on top of the ruins of an extensive prehistoric fortification. The altar furnishings in the church mainly date from the 19th century, but include a 17th-century chalice. The first structure at the site was a chapel built in the rural Gothic style, and the church was first mentioned in written sources in 1663. The church has three Baroque altars. The main altar is dedicated to Saint Mary Magdalene, and a painting of the saint by an unknown artist, dating from the mid-17th century, hangs on the right side of the nave. The north side altar is dedicated to Saint John of Nepomuk and Saint Apollonia. A painting of Mary Immaculate by Štefan Šubic hangs on the north side. The south side altar is dedicated to Saints Cosmas and Damian.

A column shrine stands in the center of the village. It has an octagonal base surmounted by a cube with rectangular niches on all four sides. It is topped by a shingled square hip roof. The shrine dates from the 19th century.

== Gallery ==
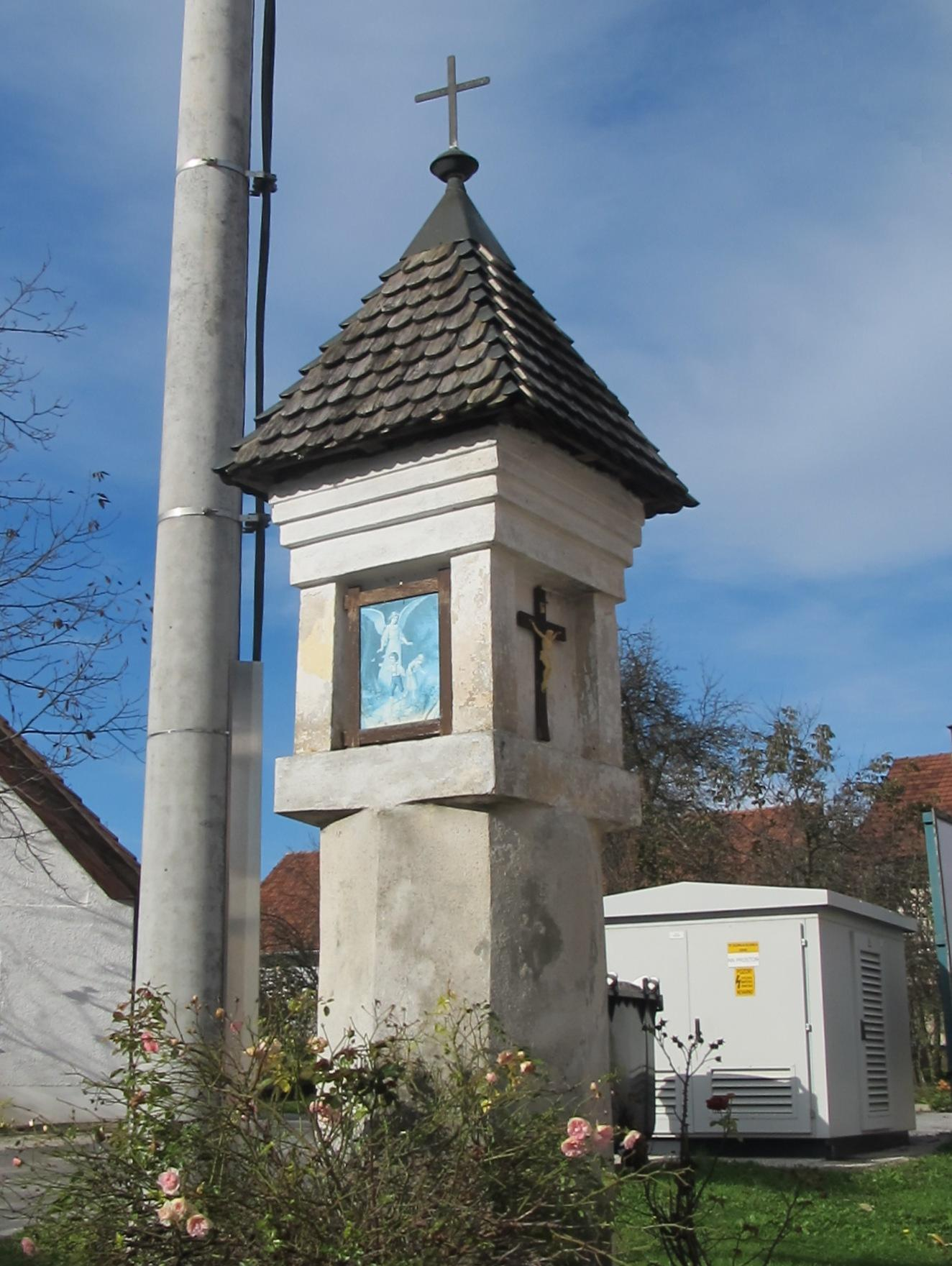
Column shrine in Zgornja Slivnica

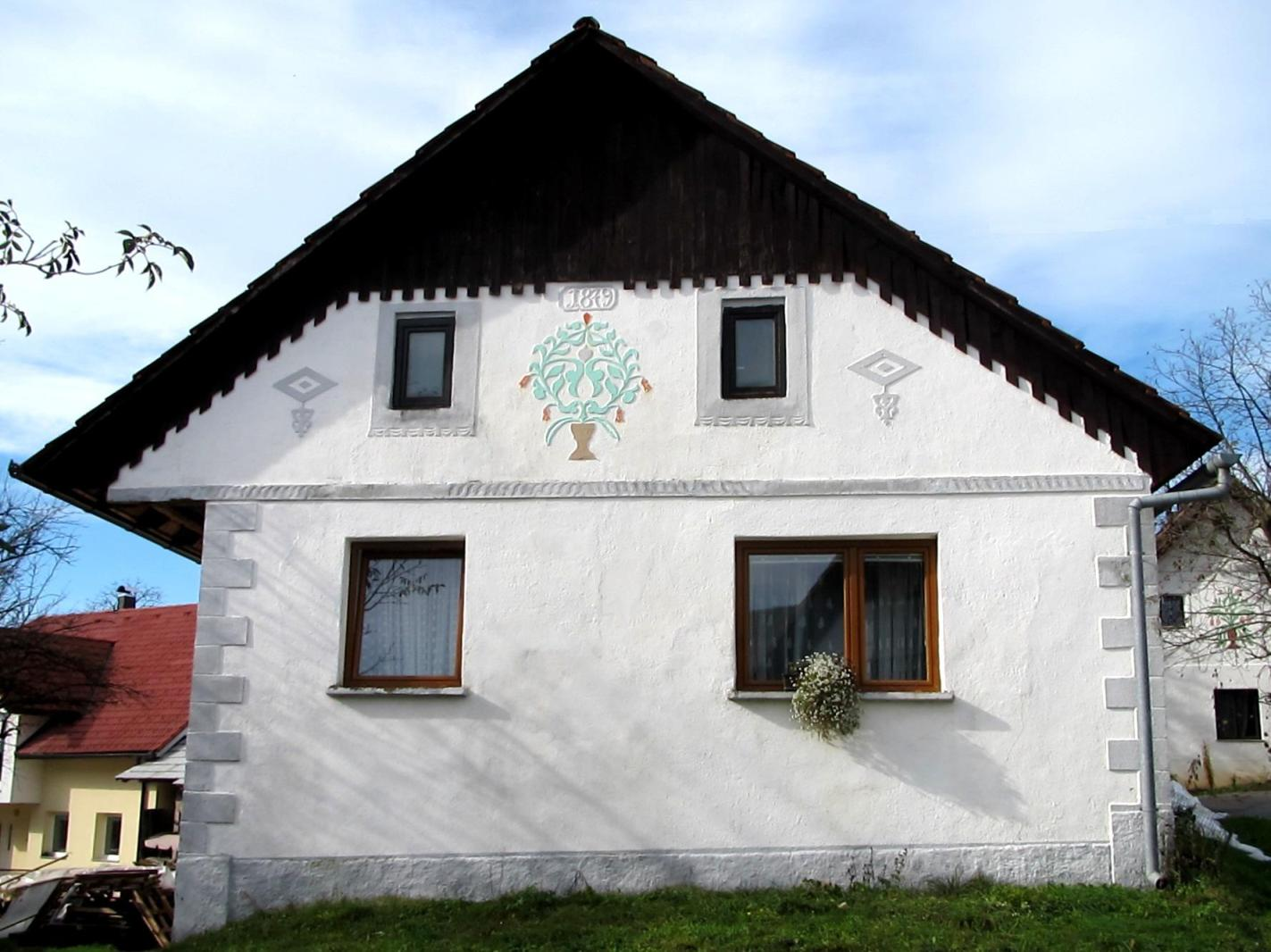
Rectory in Zgornja Slivnica

== Notable people ==
Notable people that were born or lived in Zgornja Slivnica include:

- Jože Skubic (1901–1936), agricultural and orchard expert, and journalist
