= Čeplje, Lukovica =

Čeplje
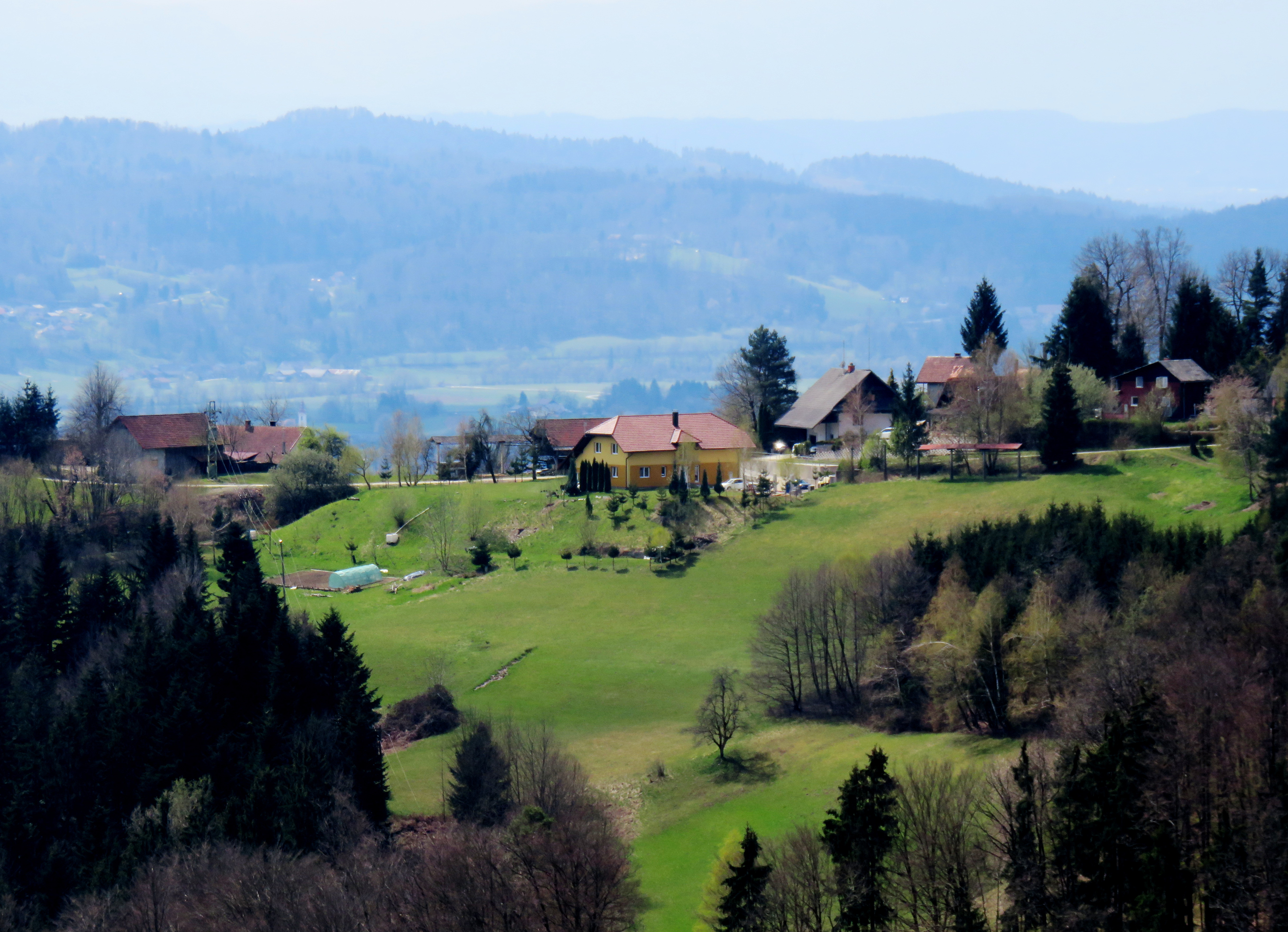

- Location in Slovenia
- Coordinates: 46°11′1.91″N 14°41′41.78″E
- Country: Slovenia
- Traditional region: Upper Carniola
- Statistical region: Central Slovenia
- Municipality: Lukovica

Area
  - Total: 1.7 km^{2} (0.66 sq mi)
- Elevation: 509.2 m (1,671 ft)

Population (2002)
  - Total: 100

Čeplje (pronounced [ˈtʃeːpljɛ]) is a dispersed settlement in the hills north of Lukovica pri Domžalah in the eastern part of the Upper Carniola region of Slovenia.
