= Prekopa, Vransko =

Prekopa
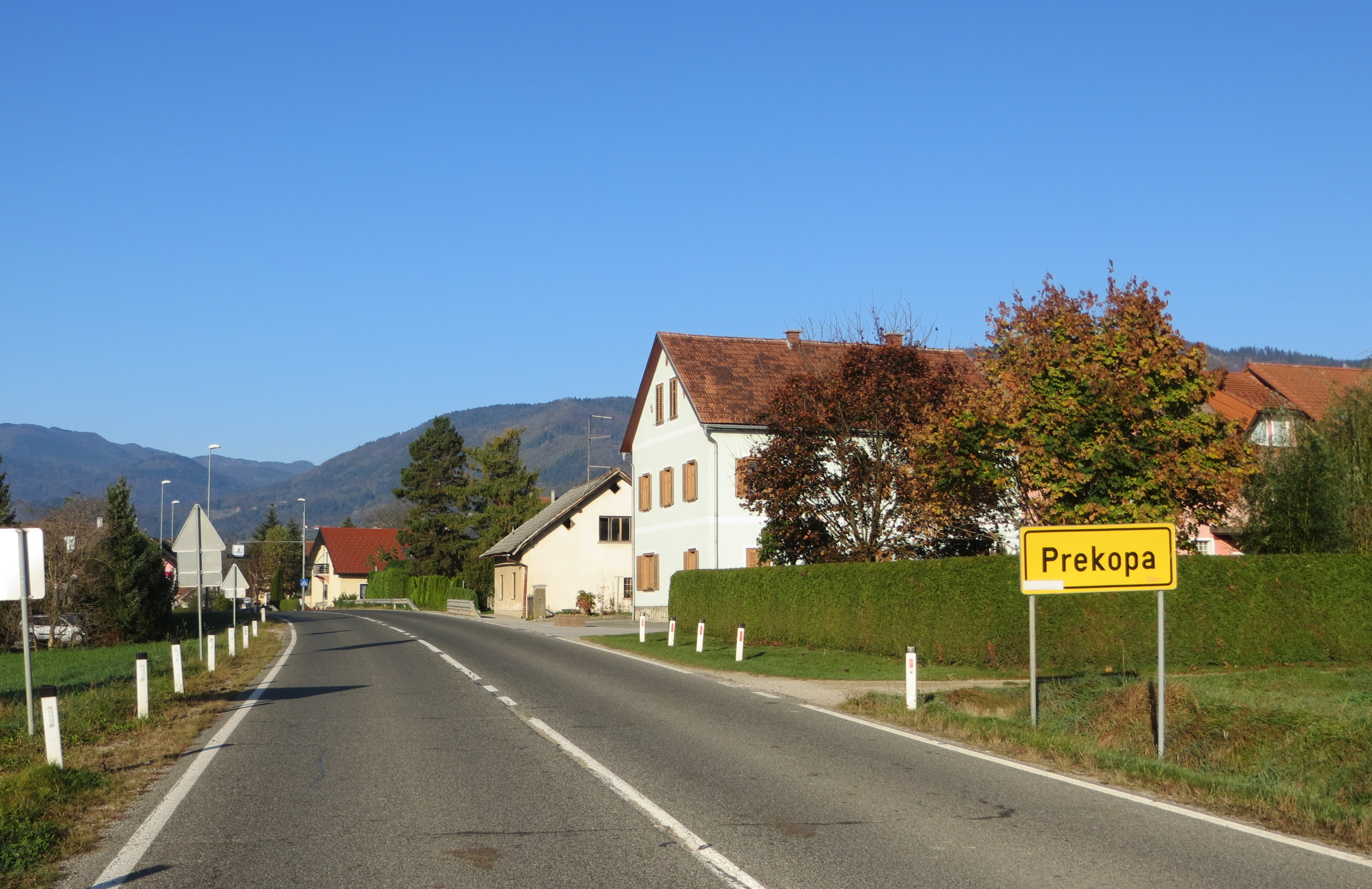

- Location in Slovenia
- Coordinates: 46°15′2.4″N 14°59′22.66″E
- Country: Slovenia
- Traditional region: Styria
- Statistical region: Savinja
- Municipality: Vransko

Area
  - Total: 2.38 km^{2} (0.92 sq mi)
- Elevation: 325 m (1,066 ft)

Population (2002)
  - Total: 216

Prekopa (pronounced [ˈpɾeːkɔpa]) is a small settlement in the Municipality of Vransko in central Slovenia. The area is part of the traditional region of Styria. The municipality is now included in the Savinja Statistical Region.

The local church built north of the settlement is dedicated to Saint Martin and belongs to the Parish of Vransko. It dates to the 16th century with some 19th-century rebuilding.
