= Slivnica, Croatia =

Slivnica
- Village
- Slivnica
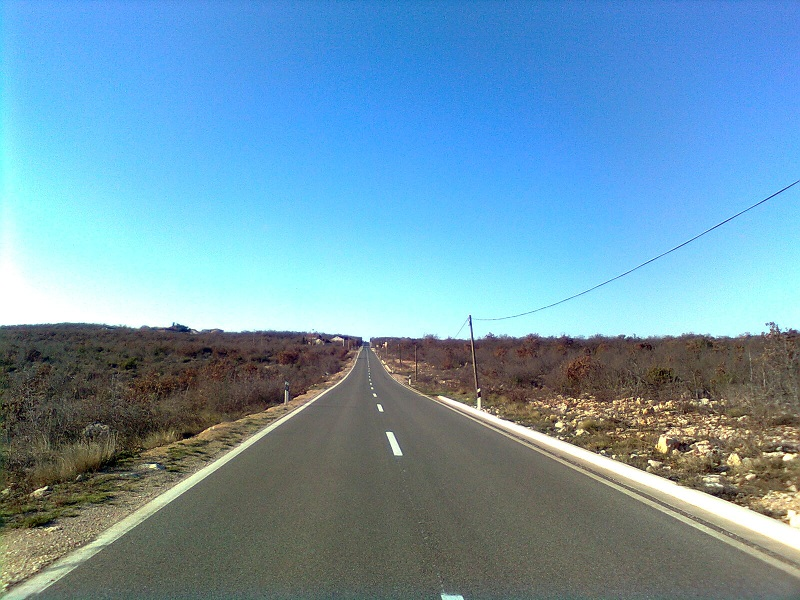
- Main road through Slivnica

- Location within Croatia
- Coordinates: 44°15′N 15°27′E
- Country: Croatia
- County: Zadar County

Government
  - Mayor: Ivica Juričević (HDZ)

Area
  - Total: 26.5 km^{2} (10.2 sq mi)

Population (2021)
  - Total: 785
  - Density: 29.6/km^{2} (76.7/sq mi)
- Time zone: UTC+1 (CET)
  - Summer (DST): UTC+2 (CEST)

Slivnica is a small village in Zadar County, Croatia. It is divided in two parts: Upper and Lower (Gornja and Donja) Slivnica. Population is 834 (2011). Slivnica is one of the biggest villages in Zadar County. The main road towards the island of Pag goes through Slivnica. Slivnica has a few stores, a beautiful small beach, a church and a pizza place.

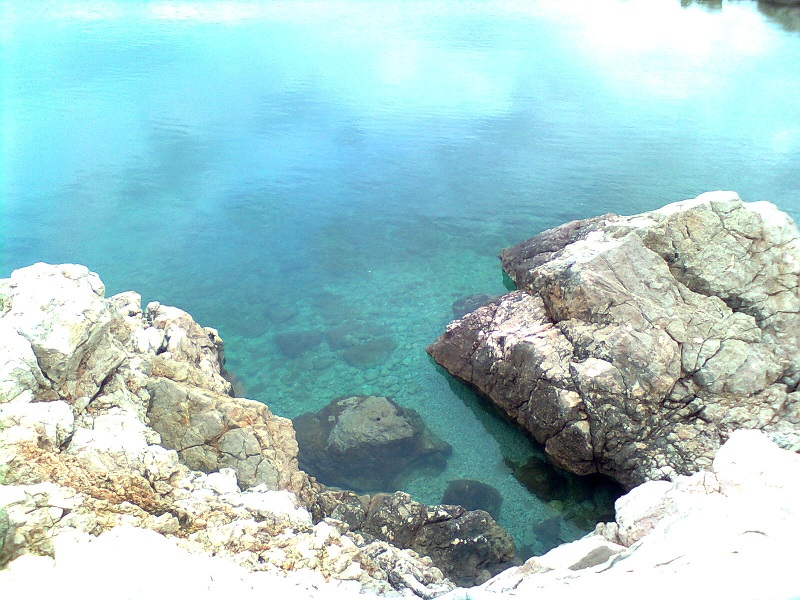
Bokulja beach

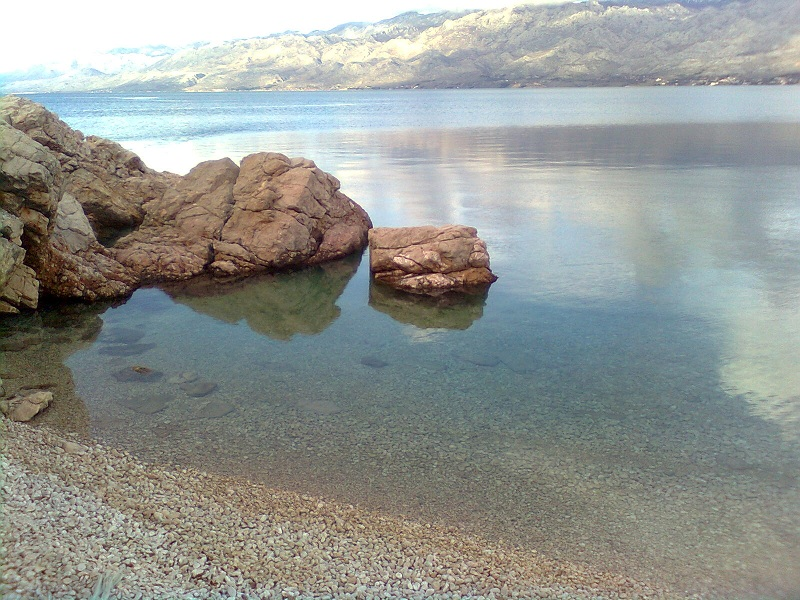
Bokulja beach

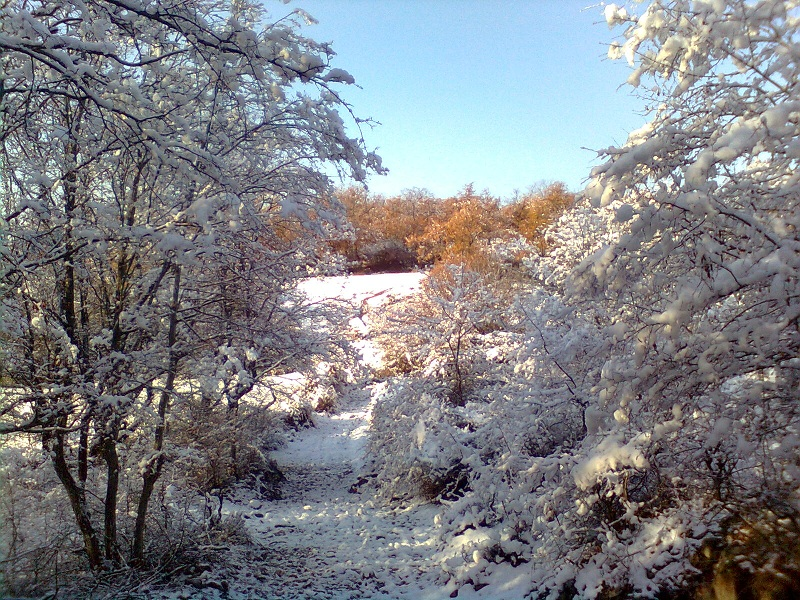
Slivnica at winter

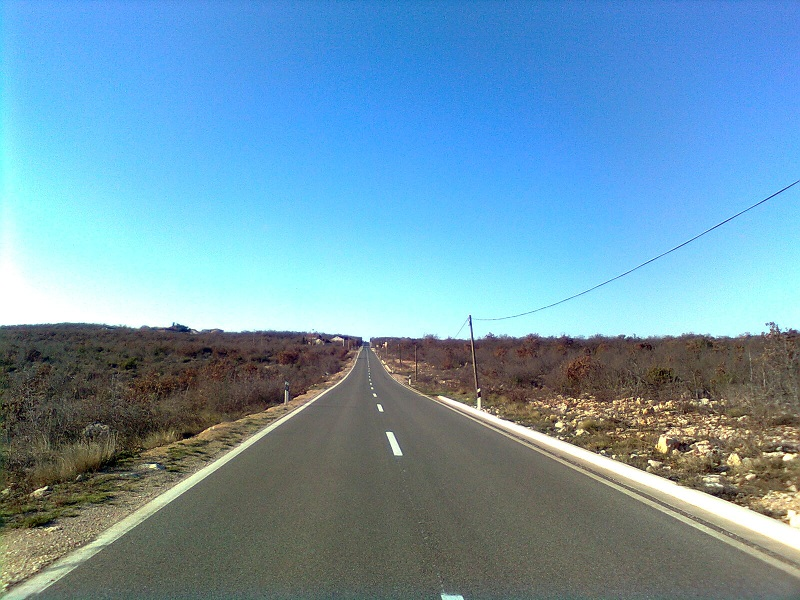
Main road through Slivnica

Villages near Slivnica are: Radovin, Jovići, Posedarje, Grgurice, Vinjerac.
