= Radohova Vas =

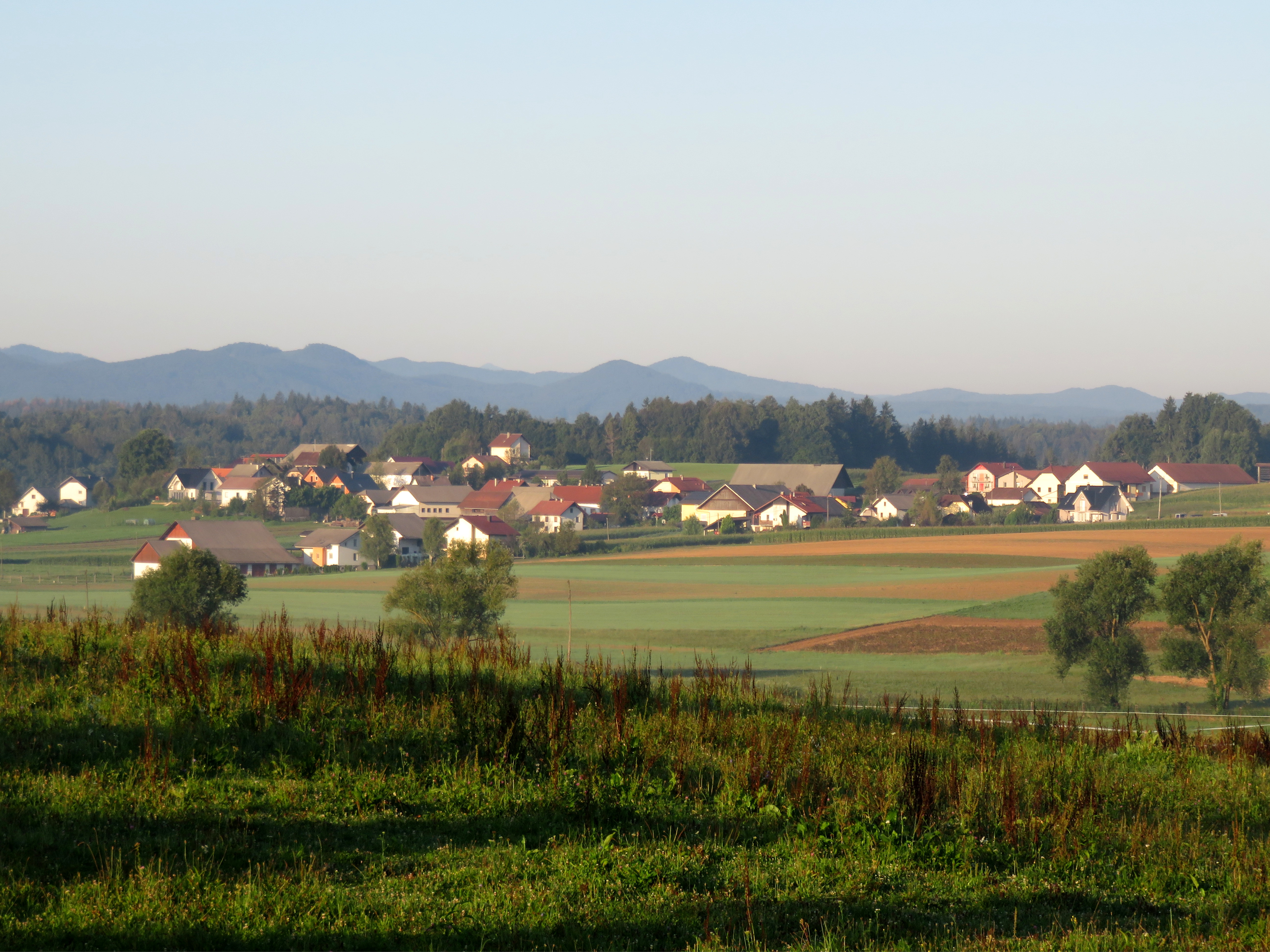

- Location in Slovenia
- Coordinates: 45°56′37.57″N 14°51′41.3″E
- Country: Slovenia
- Traditional region: Lower Carniola
- Statistical region: Central Slovenia
- Municipality: Ivančna Gorica

Area
  - Total: 1.66 km^{2} (0.64 sq mi)
- Elevation: 327.1 m (1,073 ft)

Population (2002)
  - Total: 189

Radohova Vas (pronounced [ˈɾaːdɔxɔʋa ˈʋaːs]; Slovene: Radohova vas, German: Rodockendorf) is a village southeast of Šentvid pri Stični in the Municipality of Ivančna Gorica in central Slovenia. The area is part of the historical region of Lower Carniola. The municipality is now included in the Central Slovenia Statistical Region.

In the early 20th century an Early Iron Age burial ground was discovered and partially excavated west of the settlement.

== Gallery ==
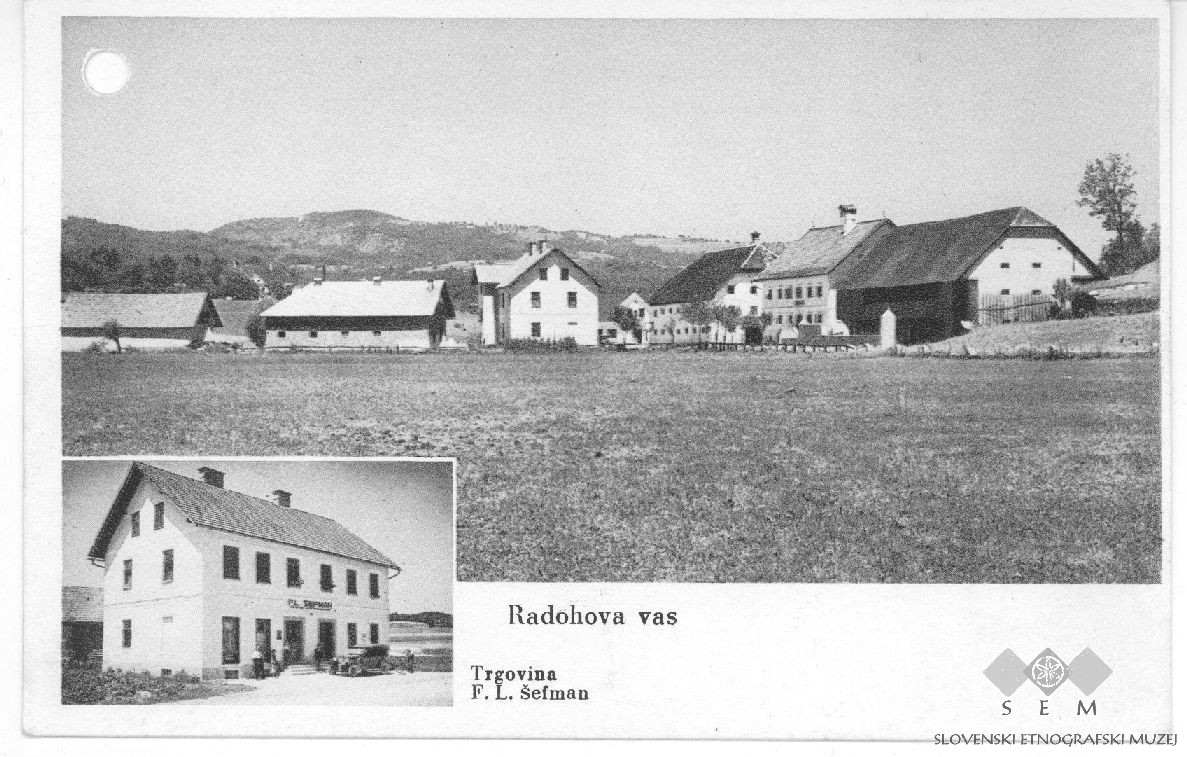
Historical postcard of Radohova Vas
