= Čeplje, Vransko =

Čeplje
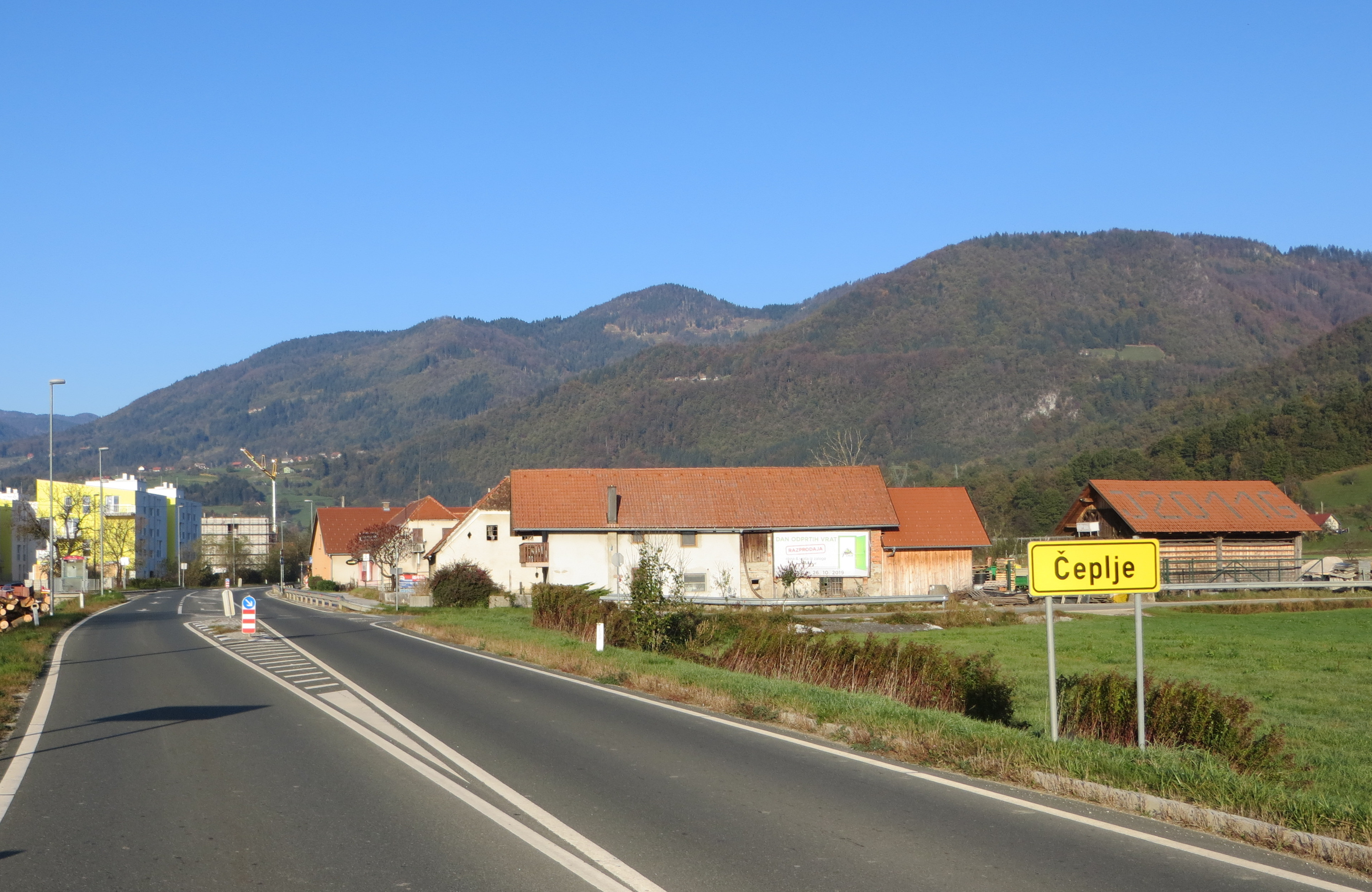

- Location in Slovenia
- Coordinates: 46°14′57.54″N 14°58′47.64″E
- Country: Slovenia
- Traditional region: Styria
- Statistical region: Savinja
- Municipality: Vransko

Area
  - Total: 2.16 km^{2} (0.83 sq mi)
- Elevation: 321.7 m (1,055 ft)

Population (2002)
  - Total: 134

Čeplje (pronounced [ˈtʃeːpljɛ]) is a village in the Municipality of Vransko in central Slovenia. It lies on the edge of the Savinja Valley east of Vransko. The Slovenian A1 motorway crosses northwest of the village core with the number 19 Vransko exit built entirely within the settlement's territory. The area is part of the traditional region of Styria. The municipality is now included in the Savinja Statistical Region.
