= Zaplanina =

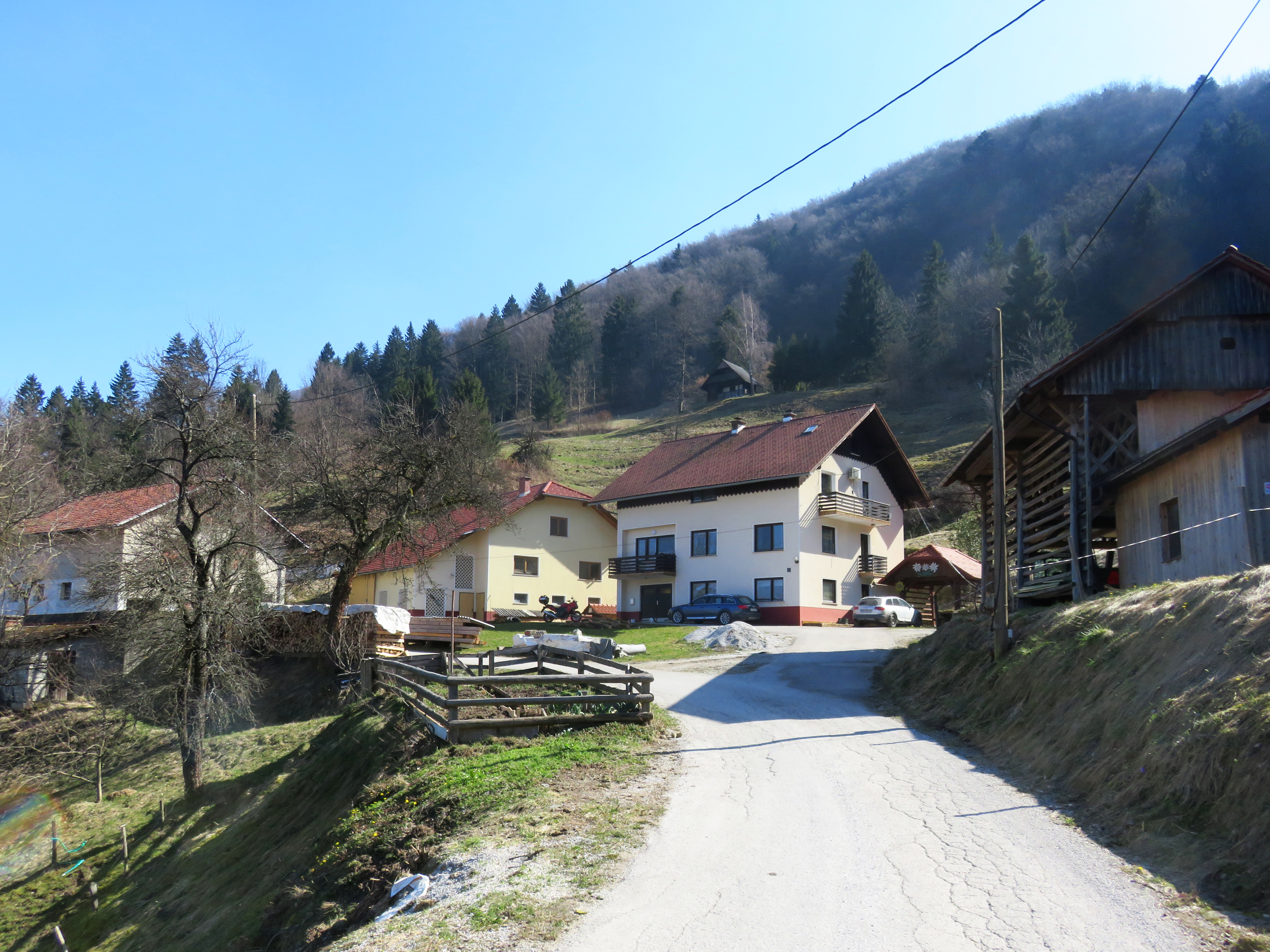

- Location in Slovenia
- Coordinates: 46°11′42.17″N 14°56′16.58″E
- Country: Slovenia
- Traditional region: Styria
- Statistical region: Savinja
- Municipality: Vransko

Area
  - Total: 6.46 km^{2} (2.49 sq mi)
- Elevation: 667.4 m (2,190 ft)

Population (2002)
  - Total: 79

Zaplanina (pronounced [zaplaˈniːna]) is a dispersed settlement in the Municipality of Vransko in central Slovenia. It lies in the hills south of Vransko. The area is part of the traditional region of Styria. The Municipality of Vransko is now included in the Savinja Statistical Region. The settlement includes the hamlets of Zgornja Zaplanina (in older sources also Gornja Zaplanina, German: Obersaplanina), Spodnja Zaplanina, and Podles.
