= Spodnja Slivnica =

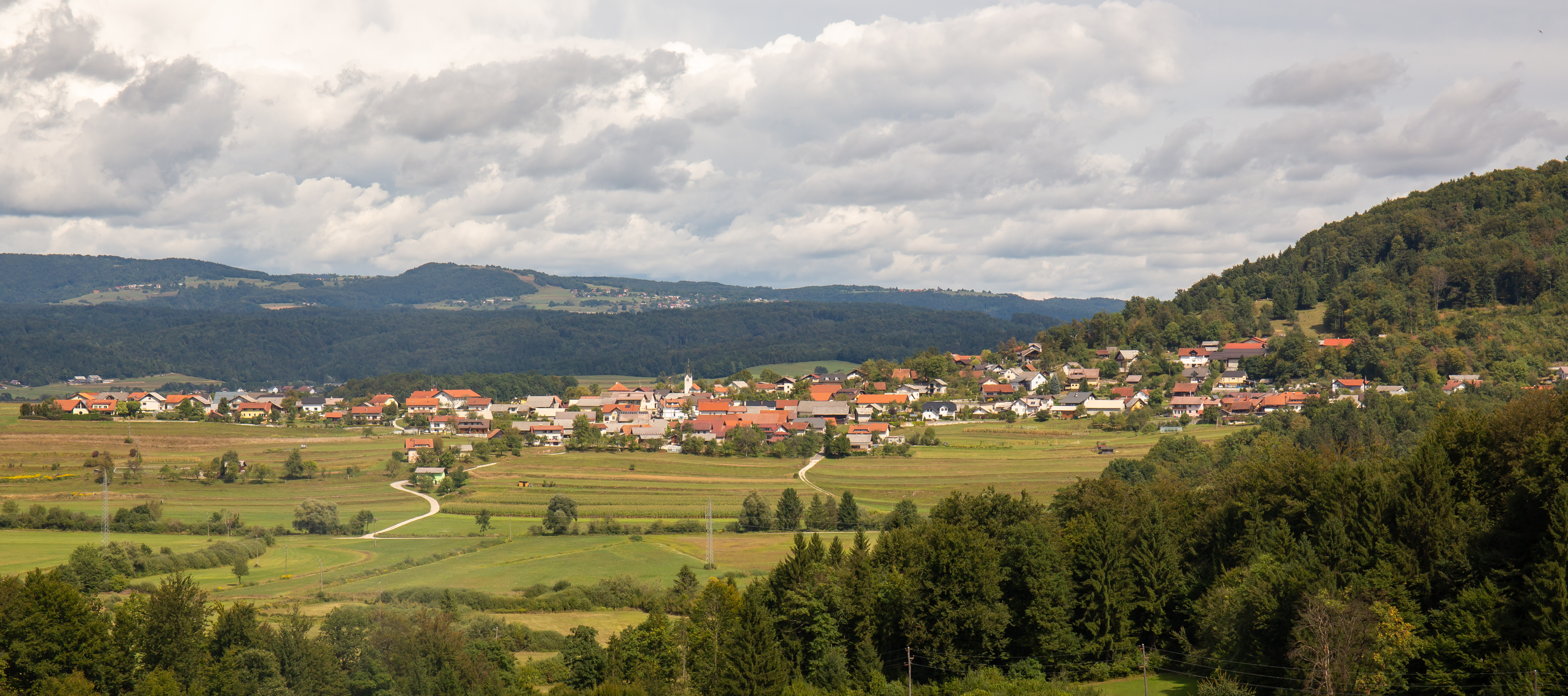
- Spodnja Slivnica from Cerovo

- Location in Slovenia
- Coordinates: 45°55′54.22″N 14°39′16.8″E
- Country: Slovenia
- Traditional region: Lower Carniola
- Statistical region: Central Slovenia
- Municipality: Grosuplje

Area
  - Total: 4.73 km^{2} (1.83 sq mi)
- Elevation: 363.7 m (1,193 ft)

Population (2002)
  - Total: 462

Spodnja Slivnica (pronounced [ˈspóːdnja ˈslíːwnitsa]; in older sources also Dolenja Slivnica, German: Unterschleinitz) is a village south of Grosuplje in central Slovenia. The area is part of the historical region of Lower Carniola. The municipality is now included in the Central Slovenia Statistical Region.

The local church is dedicated to Saints Peter and Paul and belongs to the Parish of Grosuplje. It dates to the second quarter of the 16th century.
