= Vransko =

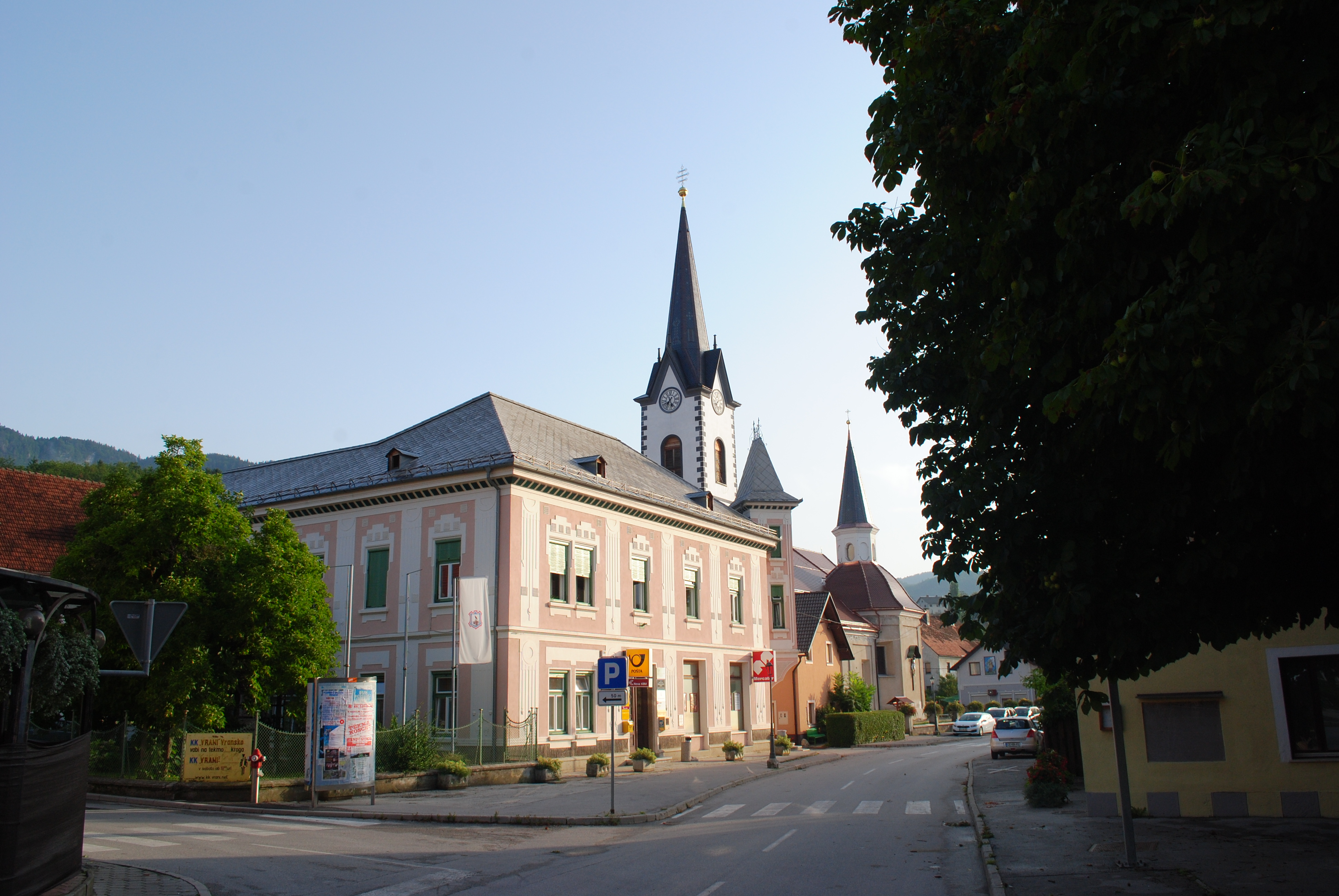

- Location in Slovenia
- Coordinates: 46°15′4″N 14°56′41″E
- Country: Slovenia
- Traditional region: Styria
- Statistical region: Savinja
- Municipality: Vransko

Area
  - Total: 3.09 km^{2} (1.19 sq mi)
- Elevation: 340.0 m (1,115.5 ft)

Population (2019)
  - Total: 808

Vransko (pronounced [ˈwɾaːnskɔ]; German: Franz) is a small town in central Slovenia. It is the seat of the Municipality of Vransko. It lies on the western edge of the Savinja Valley. This area is part of the traditional region of Styria. The municipality is now part of the Savinja Statistical Region.

== Name ==
Vransko was attested in historical sources as Vrensk in 1123–1146, Wraynçke in 1302, Vrensch in 1339, and Vraensch in 1341. The name is derived via ellipsis from *Vransko selo 'Vran's village', referring to an early individual associated with the place.

== Church ==
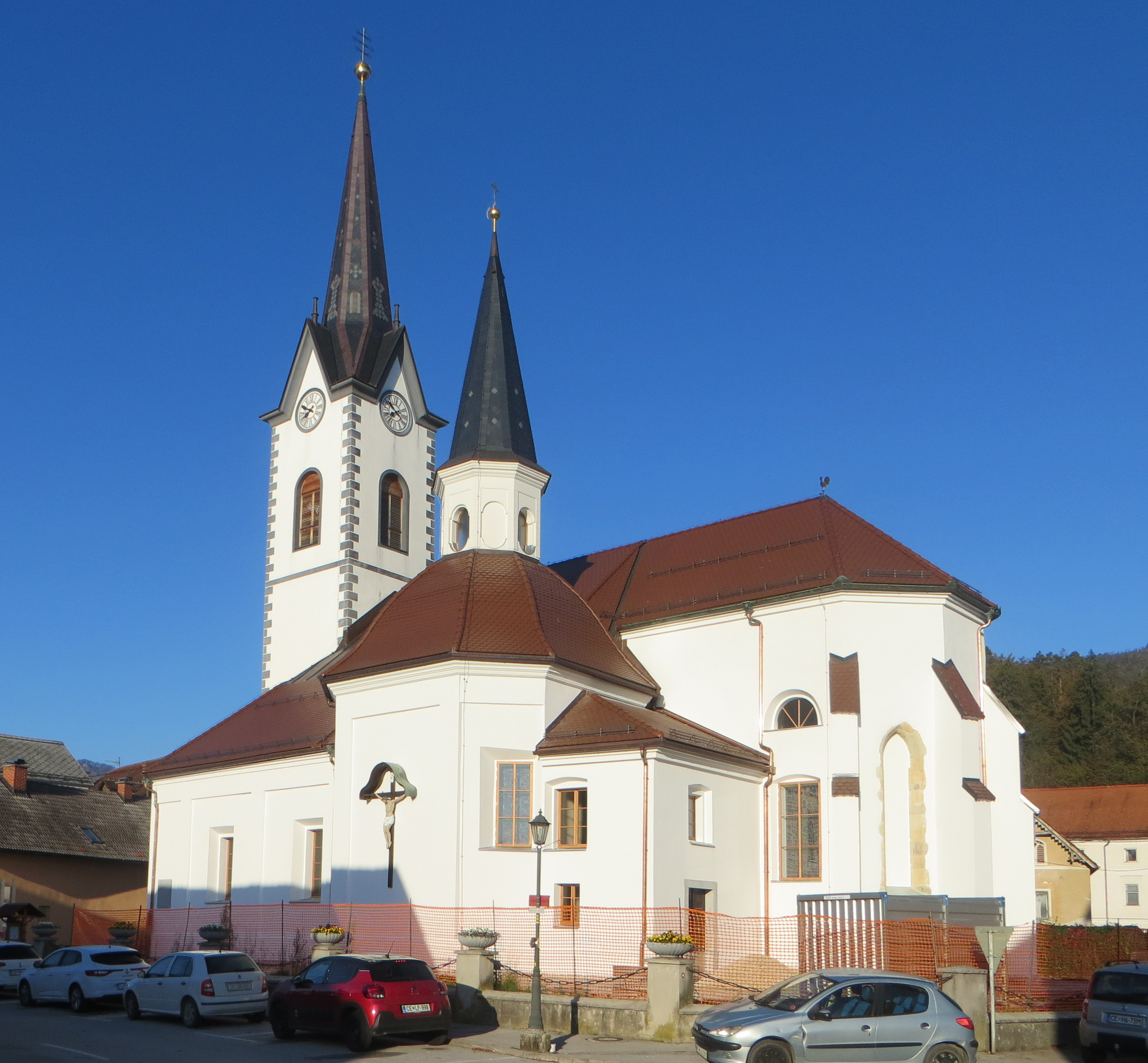
Archangel Michael Church

The parish church in the settlement is dedicated to Archangel Michael and belongs to the Roman Catholic Diocese of Celje. It was first mentioned in written documents dating to 1123 with various extensions and rebuilding over the centuries. It is now a three-naved church. One of the chapels contains an altar by the Baroque sculptor Francesco Robba.
