= Šešče pri Preboldu =

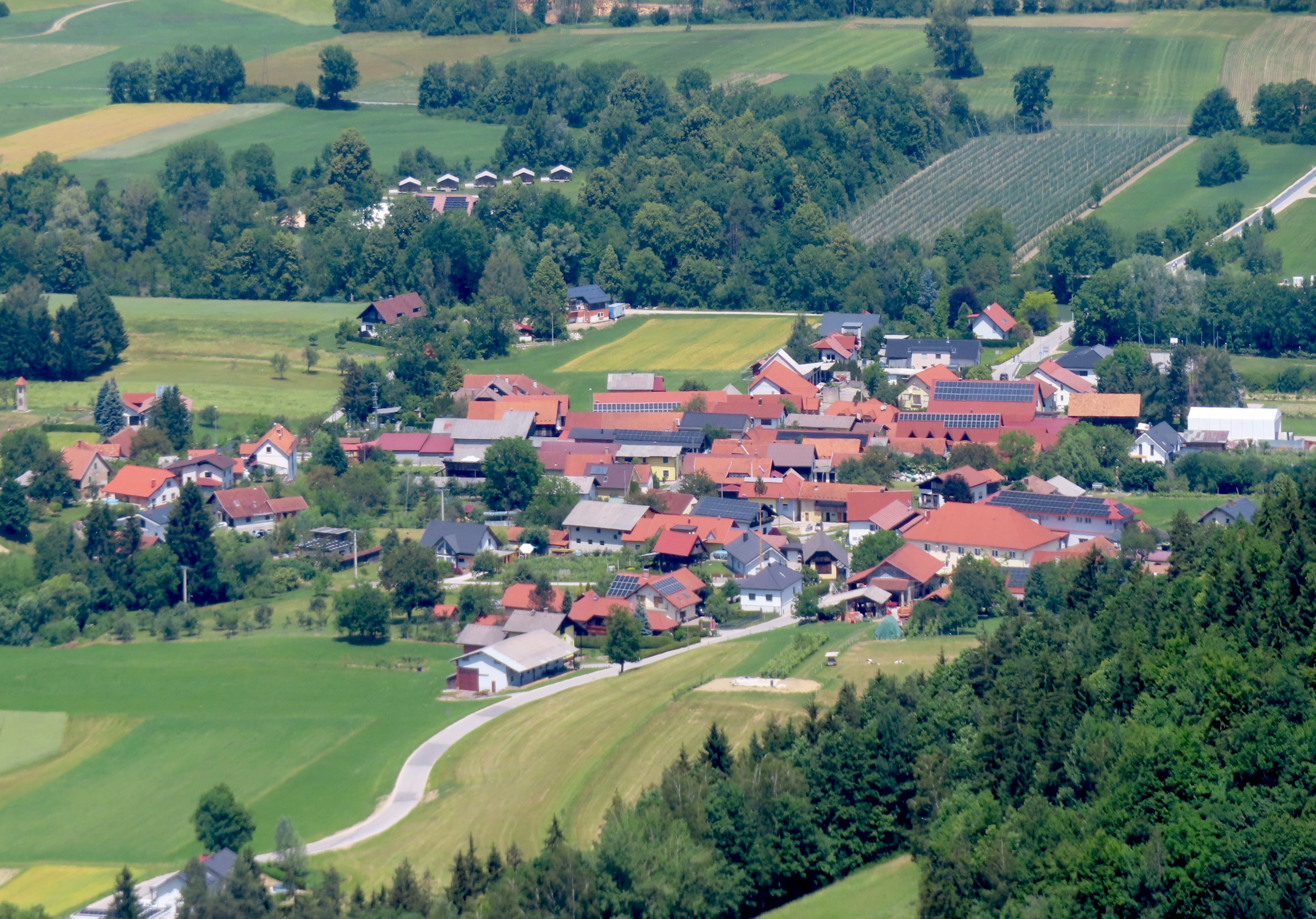

- Location in Slovenia
- Coordinates: 46°14′12.27″N 15°7′27.65″E
- Country: Slovenia
- Traditional region: Styria
- Statistical region: Savinja
- Municipality: Prebold

Area
  - Total: 2.14 km^{2} (0.83 sq mi)
- Elevation: 285.5 m (937 ft)

Population (2002)
  - Total: 391

Šešče pri Preboldu (pronounced [ˈʃeːʃtʃɛ pɾi ˈpɾeːbɔldu]; German: Schöschitz) is a settlement on the right bank of the Savinja River in the Municipality of Prebold in east-central Slovenia. The area is part of the traditional region of Styria. The municipality is now included in the Savinja Statistical Region.

== Name ==
The name of the settlement was changed from Šešče to Šešče pri Preboldu (literally, 'Šešče near Prebold') in 1952. Šešče was attested in written sources in 1265–67 as Gehsitz (and as Zesitsch in 1350, Sesiczach in 1424, and Sesitsch in 1450). The medieval attestations indicate that the name was originally *Šešičane, which is a plural demonym formed from *Šešič, and this in turn a patronymic diminutive of a personal name with the root *Šeš- or a similar root, thus referring to an early inhabitant of the place. In the past the German name was Schöschitz.

== Cultural heritage ==
Parts of an Early Iron Age burial ground have been identified near the settlement. It is part of a burial ground extending from Pongrac in the Municipality of Žalec to Sveti Lovrenc and numbering over 180 burial mounds.
