= Spodnja Rečica, Laško =

Spodnja Rečica
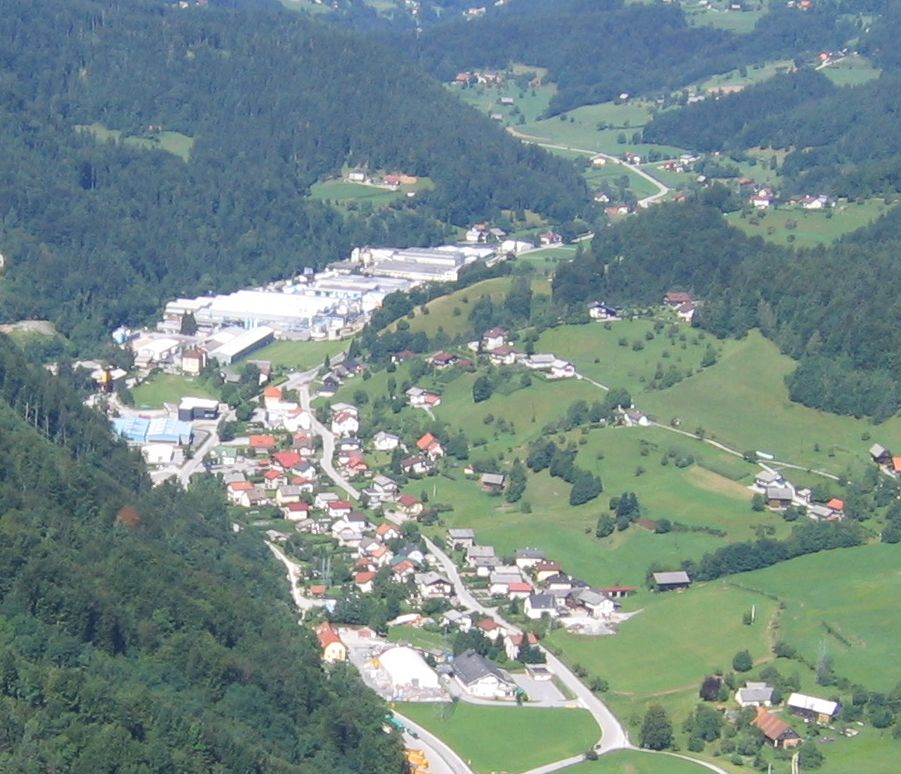
- View of Spodnja Rečica from Hum Hill

- Location in Slovenia
- Coordinates: 46°9′49.75″N 15°12′49.64″E
- Country: Slovenia
- Traditional region: Styria
- Statistical region: Savinja
- Municipality: Laško

Area
  - Total: 3.02 km^{2} (1.17 sq mi)
- Elevation: 286.6 m (940 ft)

Population (2002)
  - Total: 54
- Postal code: 3270

Spodnja Rečica (pronounced [ˈspoːdnja ɾɛˈtʃiːtsa]) is a settlement in the Municipality of Laško in eastern Slovenia. It lies in the valley of a minor right tributary of the Savinja River, just north of Laško. The area is part of the traditional region of Styria. It is now included with the rest of the municipality in the Savinja Statistical Region.

== History ==
Spodnja Rečica became a separate settlement in 1984, when the former village of Rečica was divided into Zgornja Rečica and Spodnja Rečica. Its territory was further adjusted in 1994, when Spodnja Rečica annexed part of the village of Slivno, and in 2000, when part of the settlement was annexed by the town of Laško.
