= Marija Reka =

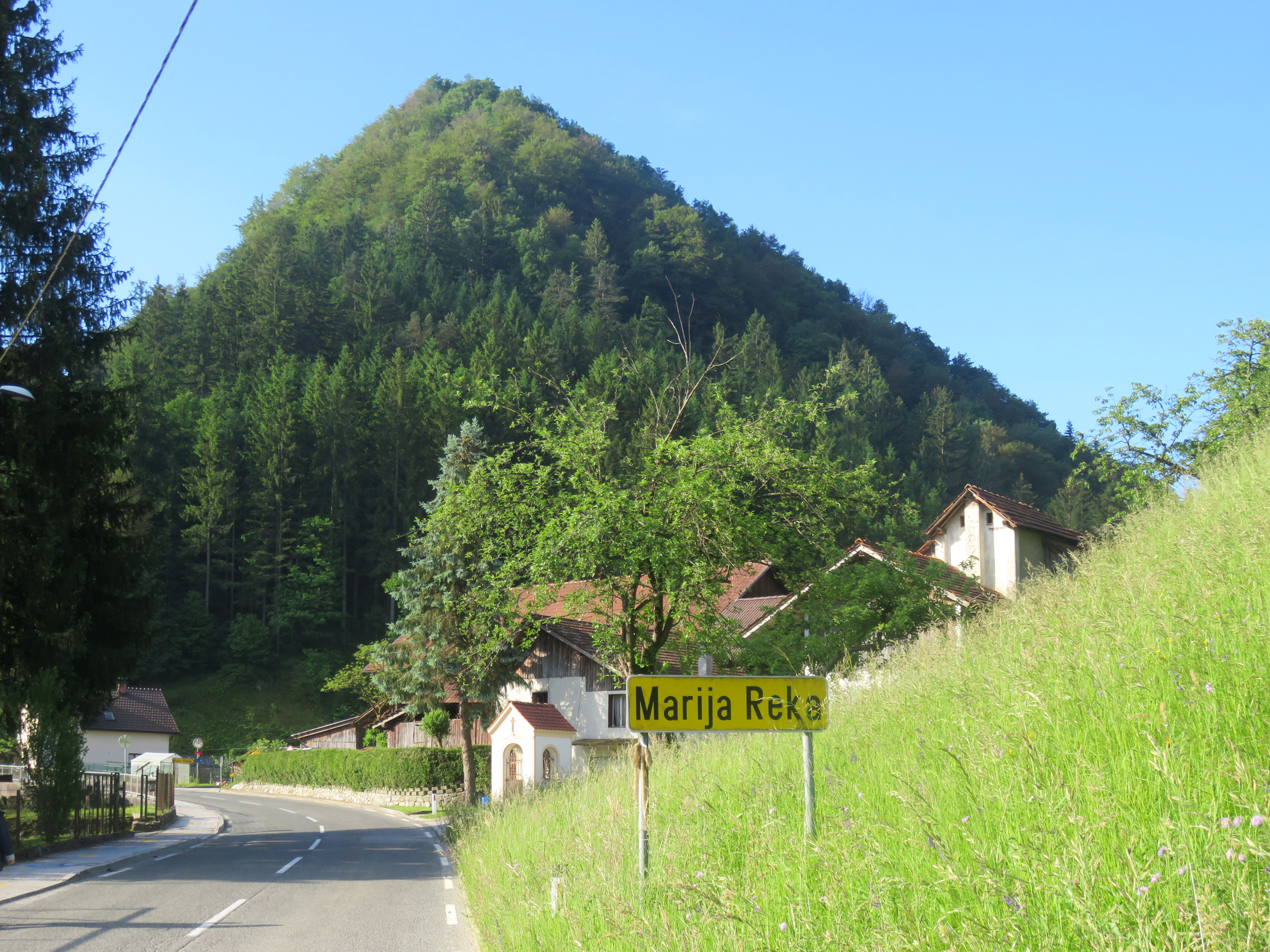

- Location in Slovenia
- Coordinates: 46°12′13.89″N 15°4′57.68″E
- Country: Slovenia
- Traditional region: Styria
- Statistical region: Savinja
- Municipality: Prebold

Area
  - Total: 19.38 km^{2} (7.48 sq mi)
- Elevation: 765.4 m (2,511 ft)

Population (2002)
  - Total: 236

Marija Reka (pronounced [maˈɾiːja ˈɾeːka]; German: Maria Riek) is a settlement in the Municipality of Prebold in east-central Slovenia. It lies in the hills south of Prebold. The area is part of the traditional region of Styria. The municipality is now included in the Savinja Statistical Region. The settlement includes the hamlets of Mala Reka, Velika Reka, and Jelenca.

== History ==
Mercury was discovered in the area in the 17th century, but was only mined for a brief period in the Hribar Gorge (Slovene: Hribarjev graben) during the interwar period. The Stergar Quarry (Slovene: Stergarjev kamnolom) operated in Marija Reka from 1936 to 1962. In the past, there were also water-driven sawmills and grain mills.

During the Second World War, the area was a crossroads for Partisan courier routes, and there were several armed engagements between Partisan and German forces in the area. On April 14, 1942, a Partisan unit destroyed a Gestapo vehicle on the road from Marija Reka to Trbovlje, and the Partisans' Robida printshop operated on the north slope of Mount Reka (Slovene: Reška planina) in the summer of 1943.

=== Mass graves ===
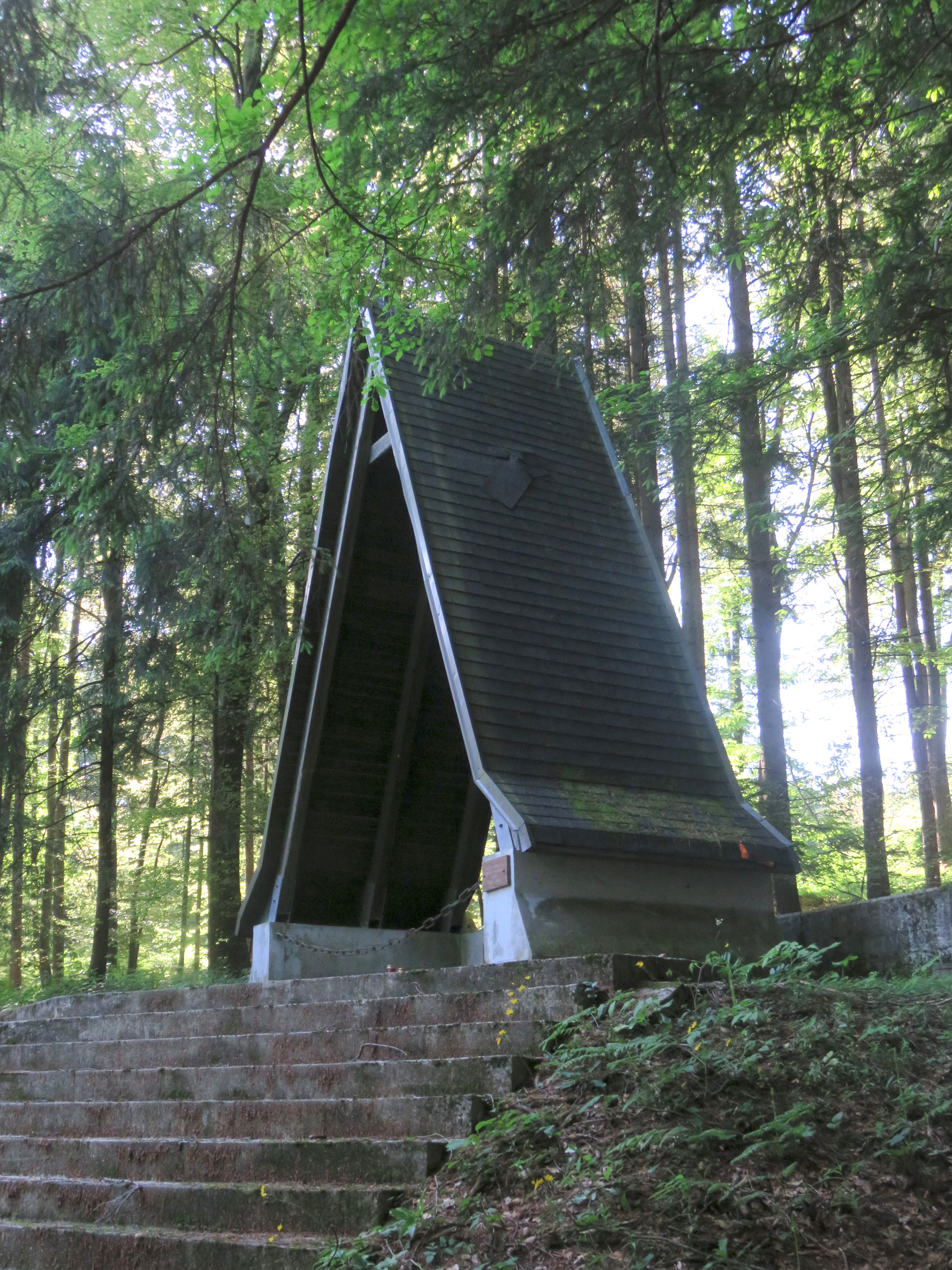
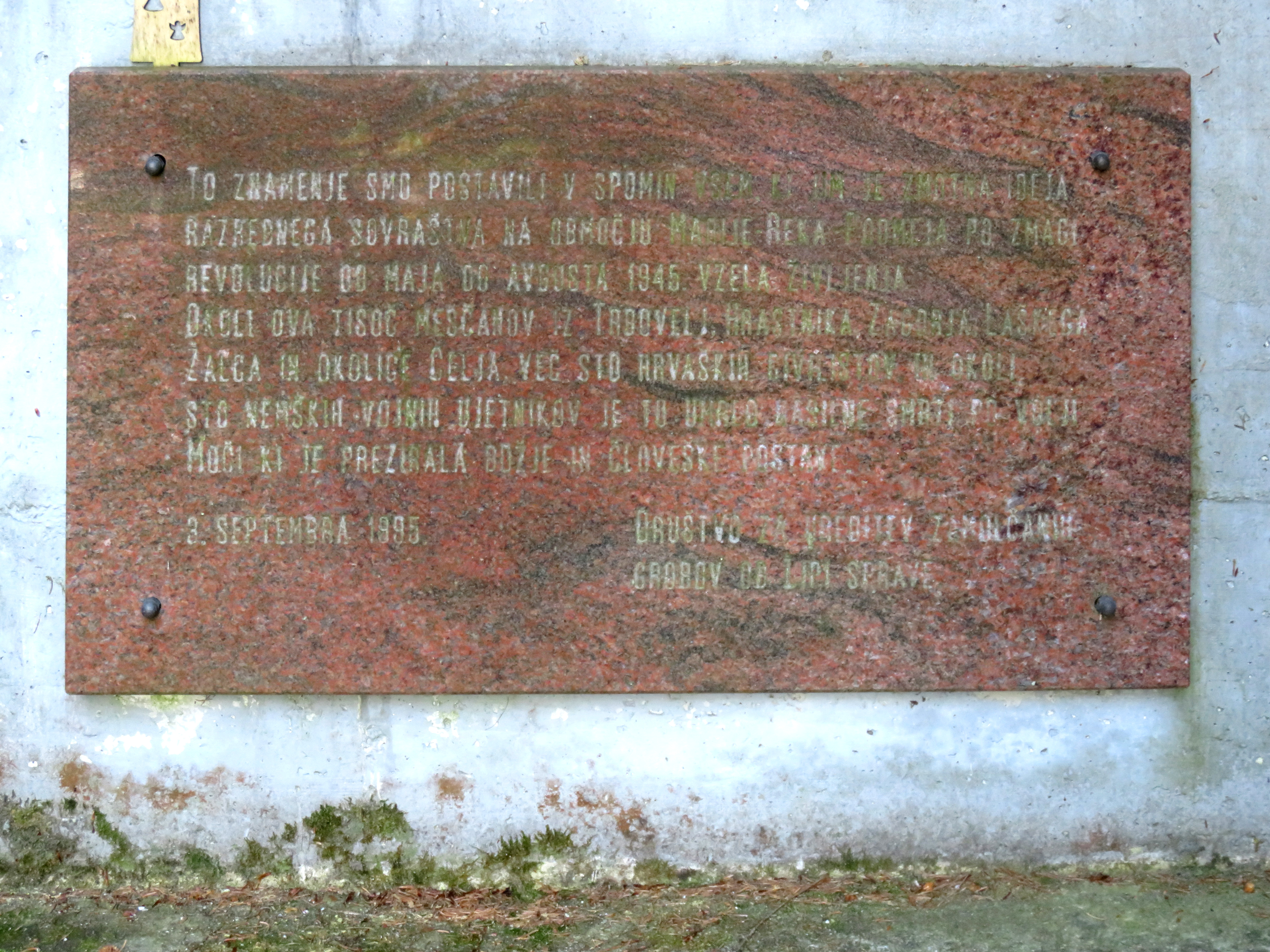
Shrine and plaque at the Kregar Ravine 1–13 mass graves

Marija Reka is the site of 13 known mass graves from the period immediately after the Second World War: the Kregar Ravine 1–13 mass graves (Slovene: Grobišče Kregarjev graben 1–13). The graves are located east and west of the Kregar Ravine southwest of the main settlement, along a forest road leading past wayside shrines into the forest. The graves contain the remains of about 2,000 civilians from Trbovlje, Hrastnik, Zagorje ob Savi, Laško, Žalec, and the surroundings of Celje, as well as several hundred Croatian civilians and about 100 German prisoners of war. The victims were murdered between May and August 1945.

== Church ==
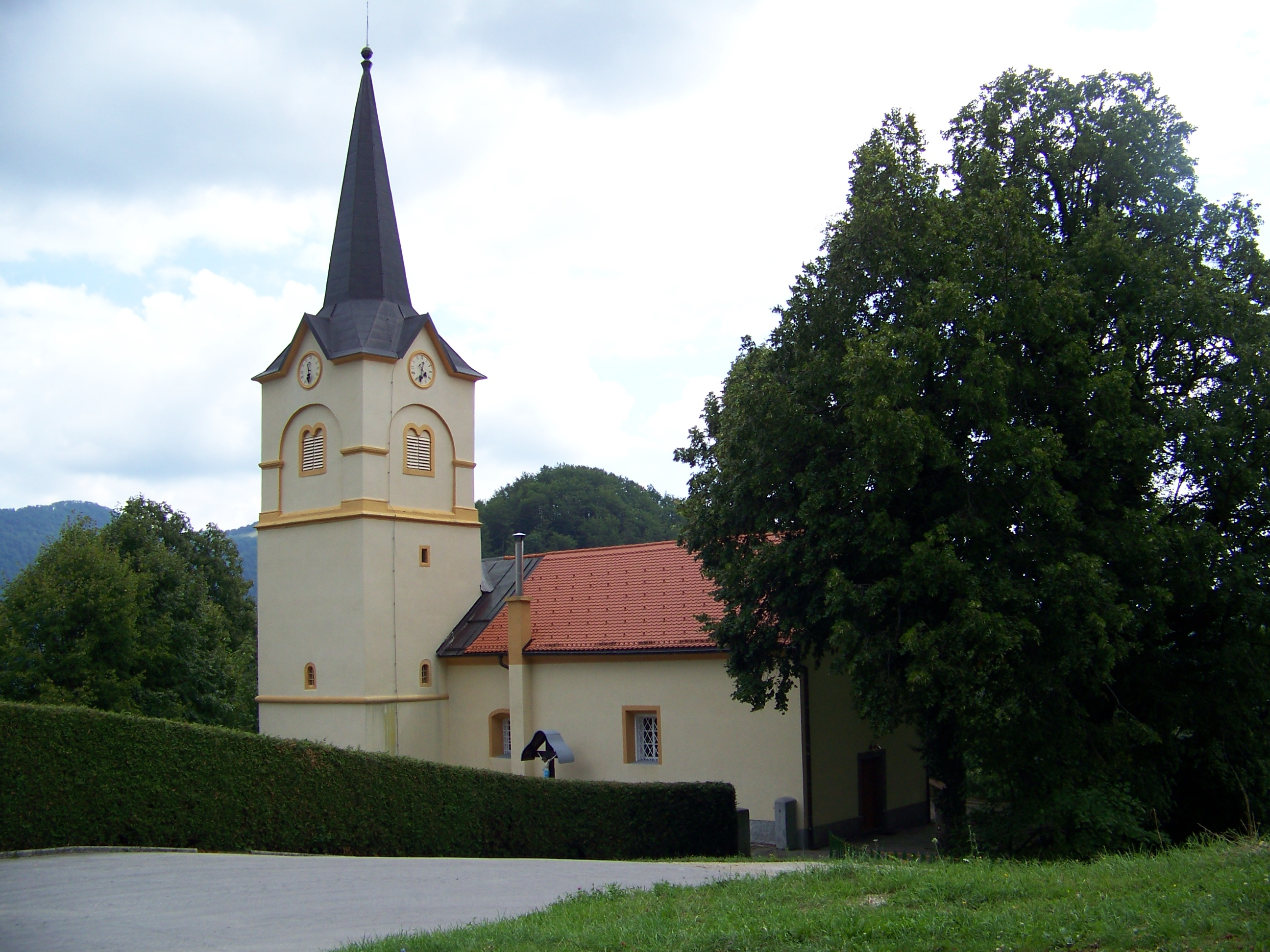
Assumption Church

The local parish church is dedicated to the Assumption of Mary and belongs to the Roman Catholic Diocese of Celje. It was originally a 14th-century church with major reconstruction in the 18th and 19th centuries. The church was first mentioned in written sources in 1545. It was damaged in a fire in 1790, and then re-vaulted. The church obtained the status of a vicariate in 1787, and a parish in 1891.

== Notable people ==
Notable people that were born of lived in Marija Reka include:

- Martn Jurhar (1880–1934), religious writer
