= Sveta Magdalena =

Sveta Magdalena may refer to several places in Slovenia:

- Matke, a settlement in the Municipality of Prebold, known as Sveta Magdalena pri Preboldu until 1955
- Vršna Vas, a settlement in the Municipality of Šmarje pri Jelšah, known as Sveta Magdalena pri Zibikih until 1955
