= Pongrac =

Pongrac Sveti Pongrac (until 1955)
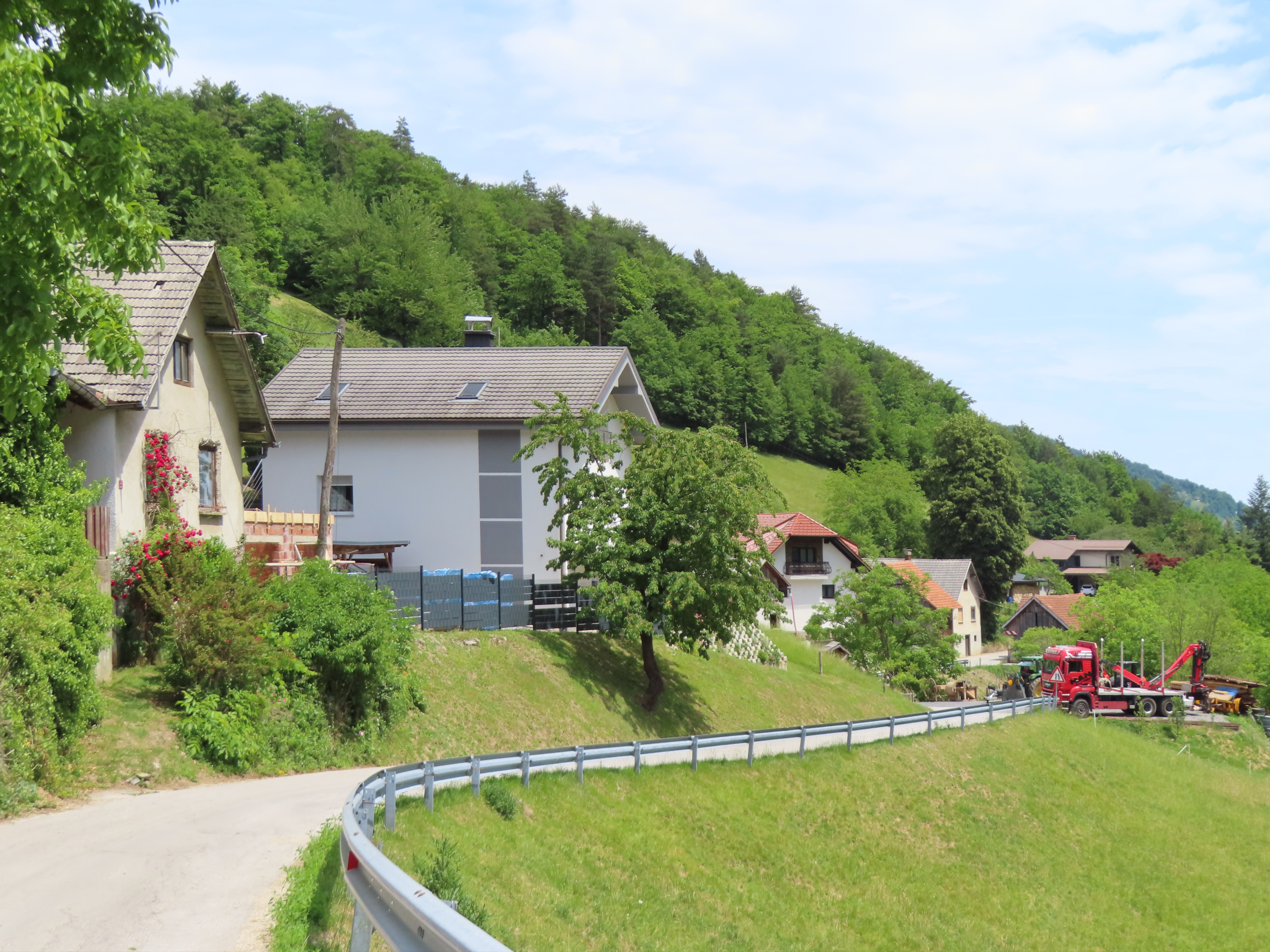

- Location in Slovenia
- Coordinates: 46°12′58.69″N 15°8′11.81″E
- Country: Slovenia
- Traditional region: Styria
- Statistical region: Savinja
- Municipality: Žalec

Area
  - Total: 14.01 km^{2} (5.41 sq mi)
- Elevation: 317.2 m (1,041 ft)

Population (2002)
  - Total: 798

Pongrac (pronounced [pɔŋˈɡɾaːts]) is a settlement in the Municipality of Žalec in east-central Slovenia. It lies in the hills south of Žalec. The area is part of the traditional region of Styria. The municipality is now included in the Savinja Statistical Region.

== Name ==
The name of the settlement was changed from Sveti Pongrac (literally, 'Saint Pancras') to Pongrac (literally, 'Pancras') in 1955. The name was changed on the basis of the 1948 Law on Names of Settlements and Designations of Squares, Streets, and Buildings as part of efforts by Slovenia's postwar communist government to remove religious elements from toponyms.

== Cultural heritage ==
An Early Iron Age burial ground has been identified in the northwestern part of the settlement, part of a burial ground extending to Sveti Lovrenc in the adjacent Municipality of Prebold and numbering over 180 burial mounds.

== Mass graves ==
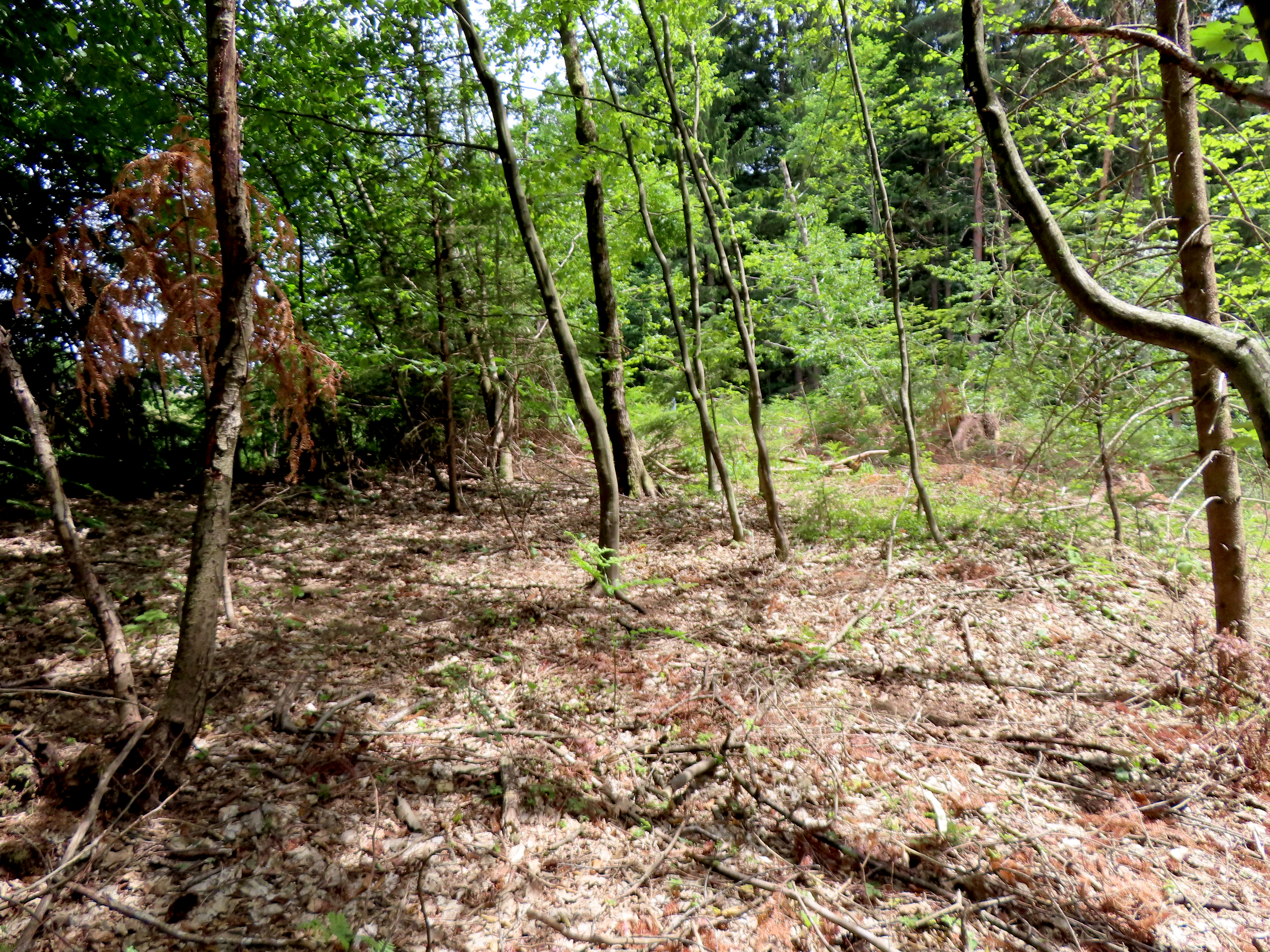
Britne Sele Mass Grave

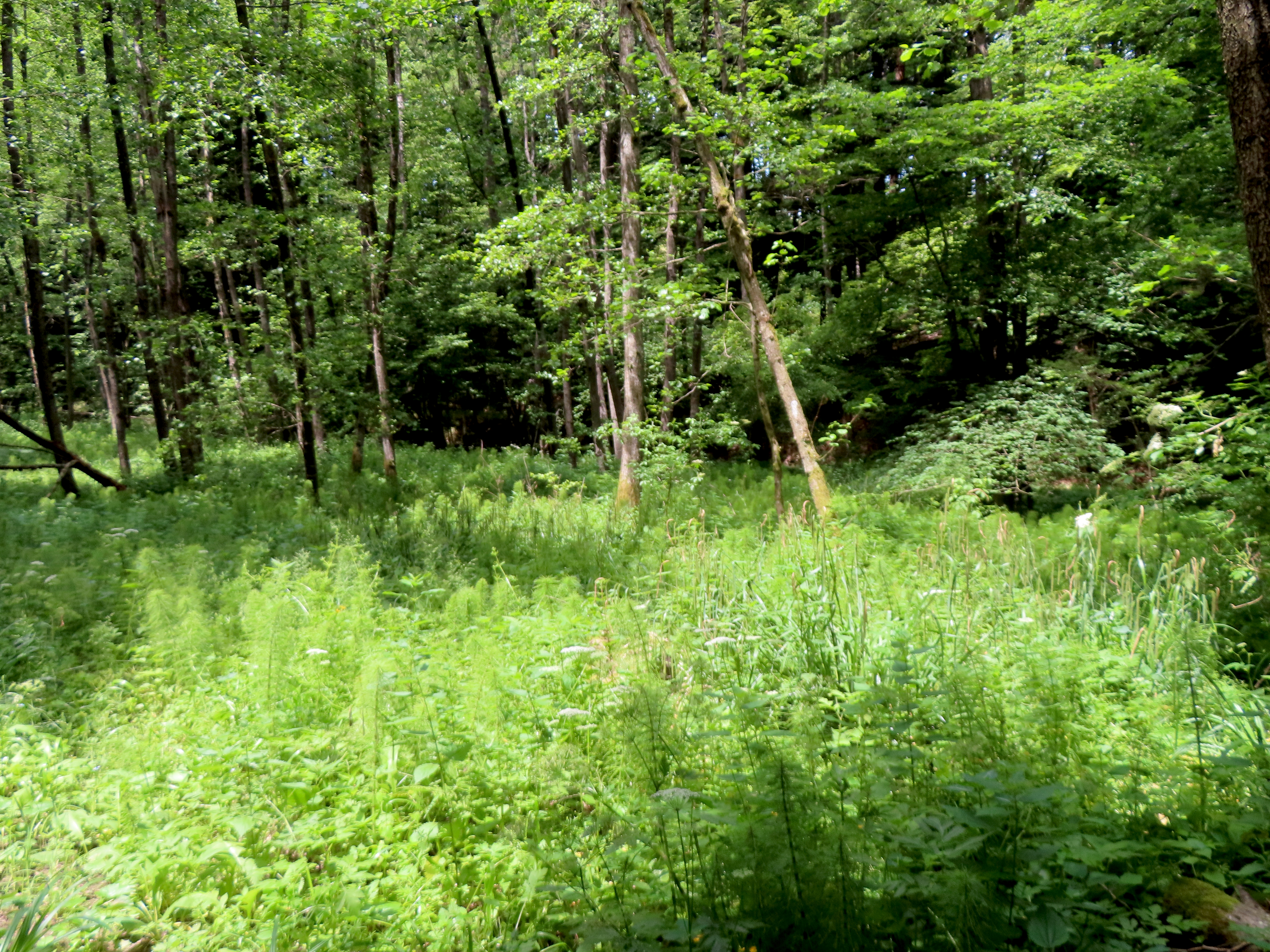
Snowdrop Valley Mass Grave

Pongrac is the site of two known mass graves from the period immediately after the Second World War. The Britne Sele Mass Grave (Slovene: Grobišče Britne sele), also known as the Halužan Mass Grave (Grobišče pod Halužanom), is located along a wooded slope, at several leveled areas at the edge of the woods. It is south of the house at Pongrac no. 63 and contains the remains of an unknown number of people murdered after the Second World War. The Snowdrop Valley Mass Grave (Grobišče Dolina zvončkov), also known as the Griže Mass Grave (Grobišče Griže), is located in a swampy area along Zibika Creek. It contains the remains of 80 to 100 young Home Guard soldiers transported from the Teharje camp and murdered here on or about 10 June 1945.
