= Slavko Šlander (district) =

Neighbourhood in Celje

Coordinates: 46°14′11″N 15°15′11″E

Slavko Šlander is a district (Slovene mestna četrt) of the City Municipality of Celje and a neighborhood of the city of Celje in Slovenia. It was named after the Slovene Partisan hero Slavko Šlander.
