= Municipality of Prebold =

Municipality of Slovenia

Municipality of Prebold Občina Prebold
- Municipality
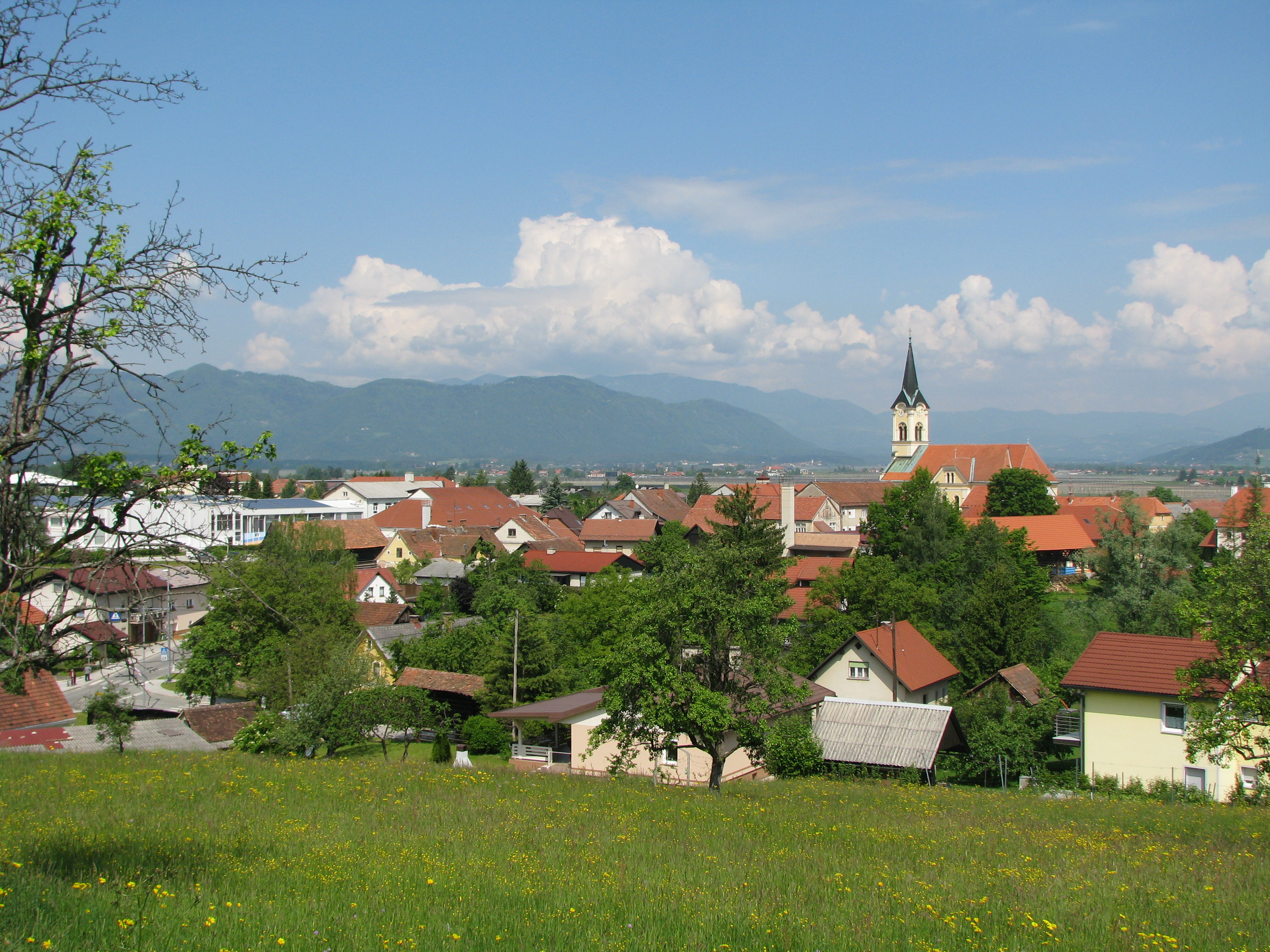

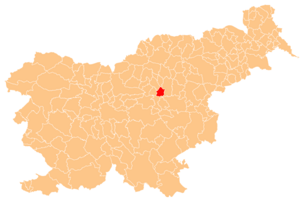
- Location of the Municipality of Prebold in Slovenia
- Coordinates: 46°14′13″N 15°05′31″E
- Country: Slovenia

Government
  - Mayor: Marko Repnik (Independent)

Area
  - Total: 41 km^{2} (16 sq mi)

Population (July 1, 2018)
  - Total: 5,052
  - Density: 120/km^{2} (320/sq mi)
- Time zone: UTC+01 (CET)
  - Summer (DST): UTC+02 (CEST)
- Website: www.prebold.si

The Municipality of Prebold (pronounced [ˈpɾeːbɔlt]; Slovene: Občina Prebold) is a small municipality in central Slovenia. The seat of the municipality is Prebold. The municipality lies on the edge of the lower Savinja Valley at the northern edge of the Sava Hills west of Celje. The area is part of the traditional region of Styria. The municipality is now included in the Savinja Statistical Region. It is primarily known for growing hops.

== Settlements ==
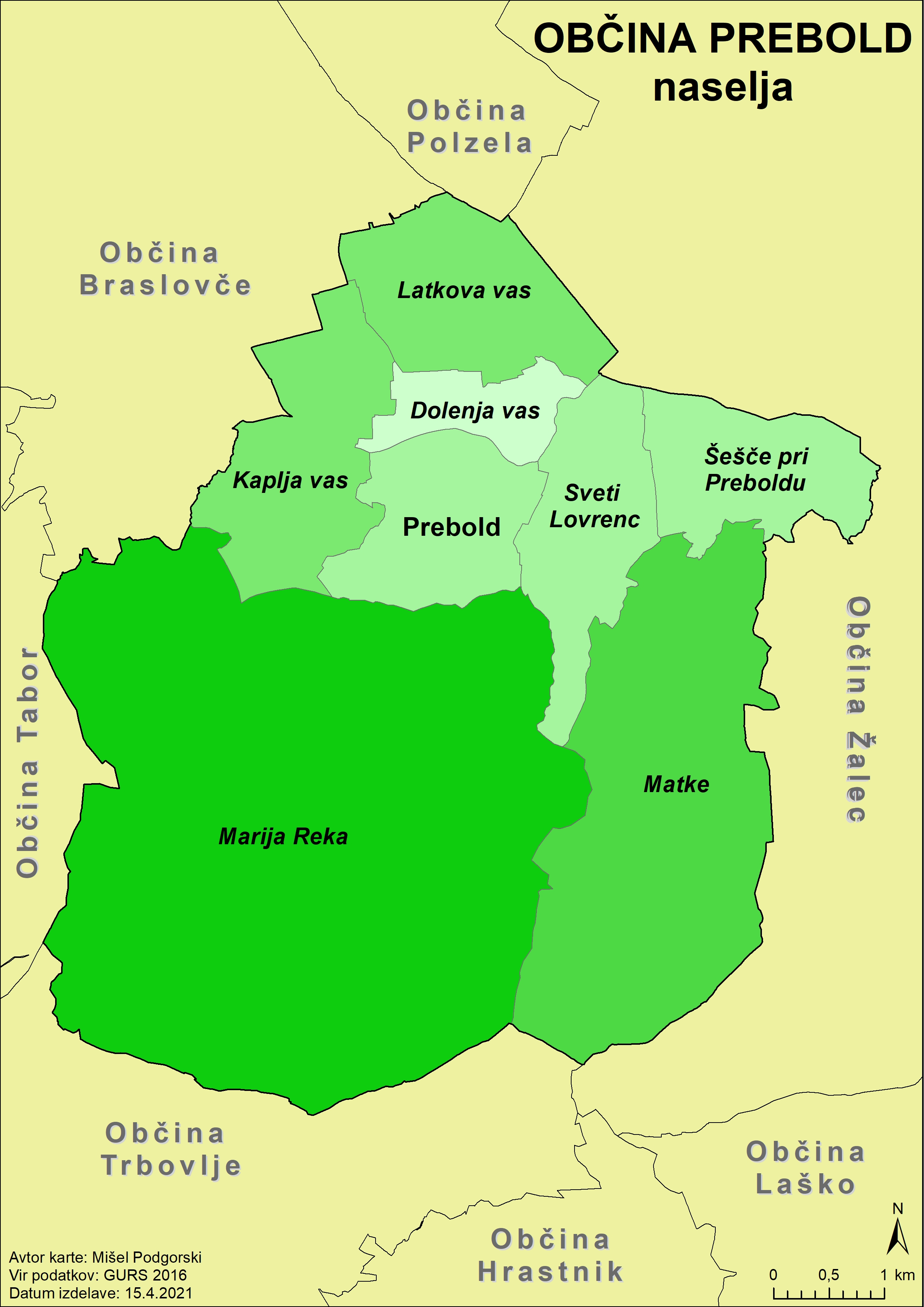
Villages in the municipality

In addition to the municipal seat of Prebold, the municipality also includes the following settlements:

- Dolenja Vas
- Kaplja Vas
- Latkova Vas
- Marija Reka
- Matke
- Šešče pri Preboldu
- Sveti Lovrenc
