= Latkova Vas =

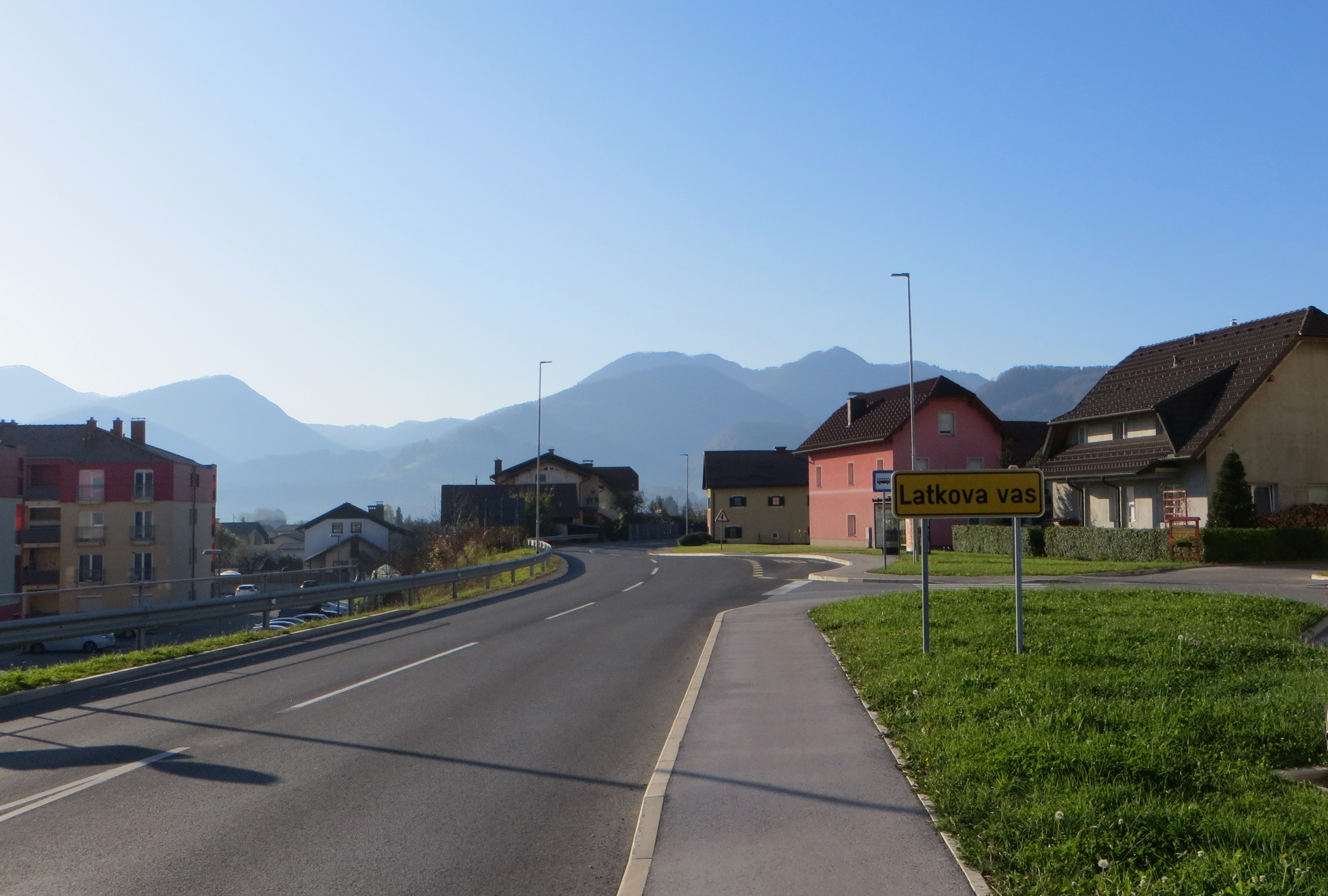

- Location in Slovenia
- Coordinates: 46°14′48.32″N 15°5′46.43″E
- Country: Slovenia
- Traditional region: Styria
- Statistical region: Savinja
- Municipality: Prebold

Area
  - Total: 2.74 km^{2} (1.06 sq mi)
- Elevation: 270.2 m (886 ft)

Population (2002)
  - Total: 774

Latkova Vas (pronounced [laˈtkɔːʋa ˈʋaːs] or [laˈtkoːʋa ˈʋaːs]; Slovene: Latkova vas) is a village in the Municipality of Prebold in east-central Slovenia. It lies on the right bank of the Savinja River north of Prebold. The area is part of the traditional region of Styria and is included in the Savinja Statistical Region.
