= Kaplja Vas, Prebold =

Kaplja Vas
- Village
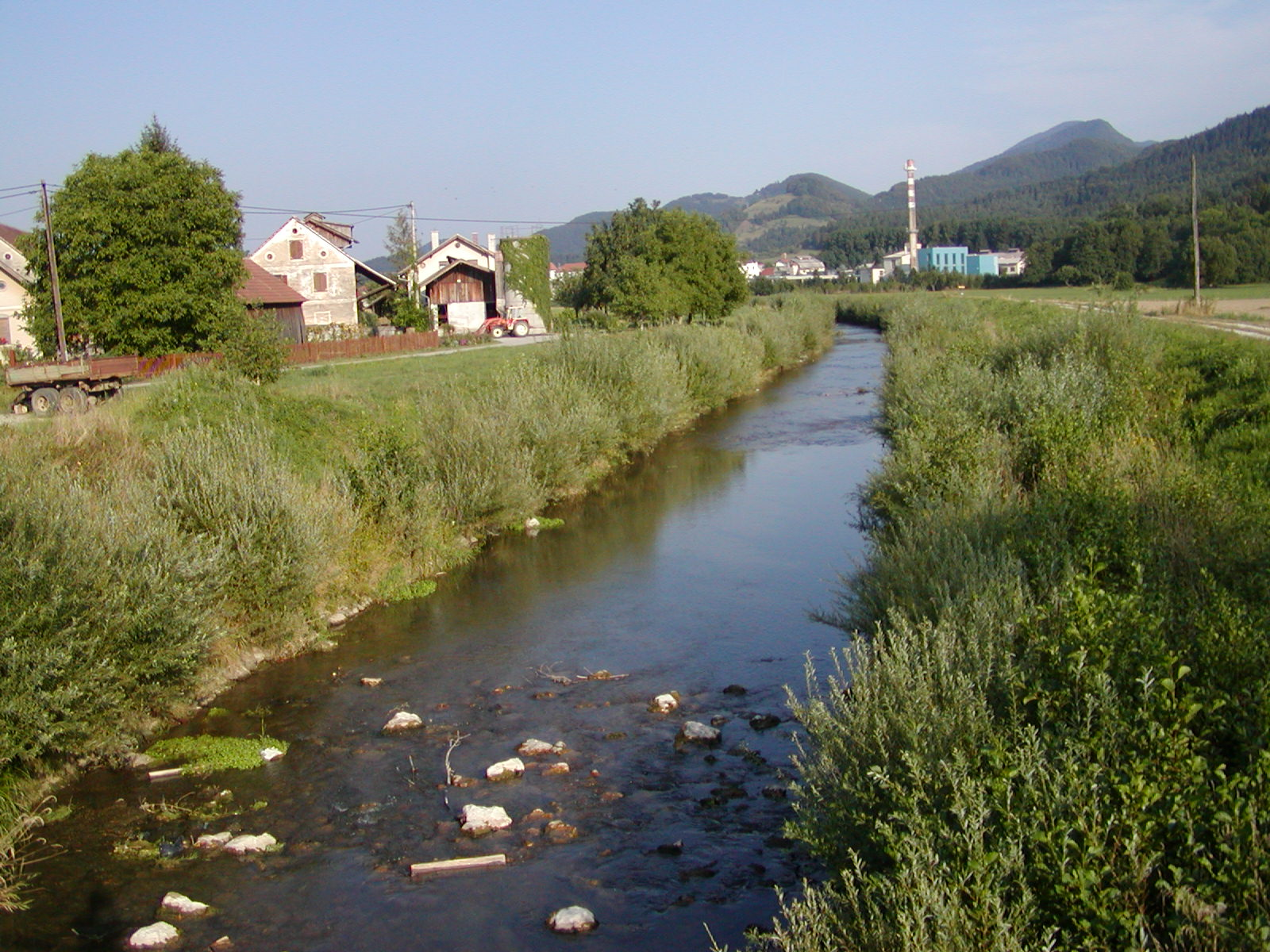

- Location in Slovenia
- Coordinates: 46°14′27.97″N 15°4′42.44″E
- Country: Slovenia
- Traditional region: Styria
- Statistical region: Savinja
- Municipality: Prebold

Area
  - Total: 3.0 km^{2} (1.2 sq mi)
- Elevation: 275.4 m (904 ft)

Population (2014)
  - Total: 293
  - Density: 98/km^{2} (250/sq mi)

Kaplja Vas (pronounced [ˈkaːplja ˈʋaːs]; Slovene: Kaplja vas) is a settlement in the Municipality of Prebold in east-central Slovenia. The village core lies on the flatlands on the right bank of the Savinja River northwest of Prebold and its territory extends into the hills to the south, to the top of Fat Peak (Slovene: Tolsti vrh, 756 m). The area is part of the traditional region of Styria. The entire municipality is now included in the Savinja Statistical Region.
