= Zgornja Rečica =

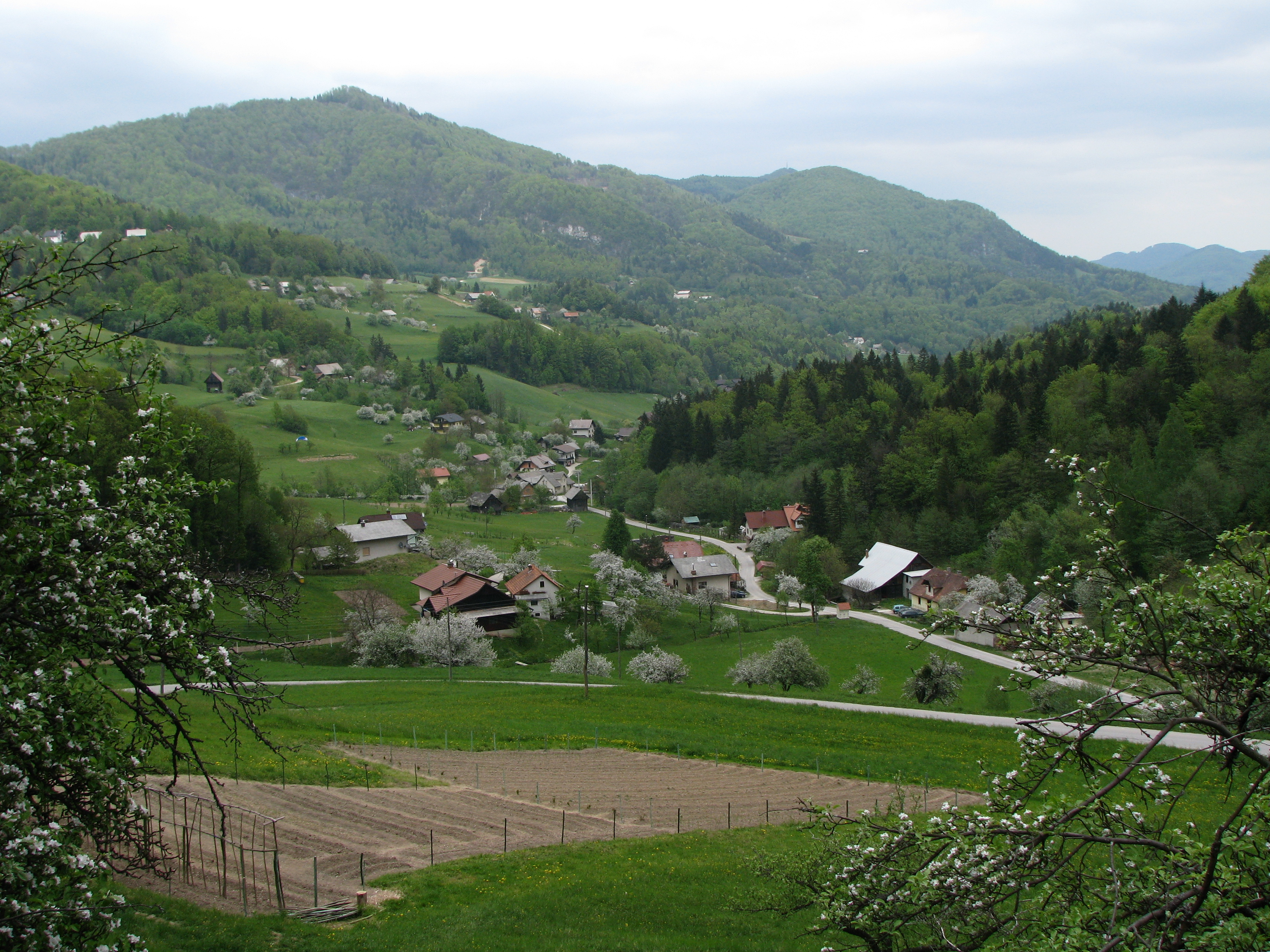

- Location in Slovenia
- Coordinates: 46°10′27.3″N 15°19′48.88″E
- Country: Slovenia
- Traditional region: Styria
- Statistical region: Savinja
- Municipality: Laško

Area
  - Total: 12.17 km^{2} (4.70 sq mi)
- Elevation: 490 m (1,610 ft)

Population (2002)
  - Total: 452
- Postal code: 3270

Zgornja Rečica (pronounced [ˈzɡoːɾnja ɾɛˈtʃiːtsa]) is a settlement in the Municipality of Laško in eastern Slovenia. It lies in the upper valley of a minor right bank tributary of the Savinja River in the hills northeast of Laško. The area is part of the traditional region of Styria. It is now included with the rest of the municipality in the Savinja Statistical Region.

== History ==
Zgornja Rečica became a separate settlement in 1984, when the former village of Rečica was divided into Spodnja Rečica and Zgornja Rečica.

== Church ==
The local church, built on a slight elevation in the centre of the settlement, is dedicated to the Blessed Anton Martin Slomšek and belongs to the Parish of Laško. It was built in 1939.
