= Slavko Šlander =

Slovene communist, partisan, and people's hero (1909–1941)

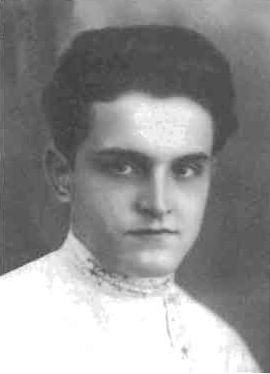
Slavko Šlander

Slavko Šlander, nom de guerre Aleš (20 June 1909 – 24 August 1941), was a Slovene communist, Partisan, and people's hero.

He was born in Dolenja Vas near Prebold, Duchy of Styria, Austria-Hungary (now part of Slovenia). After he was shot in Maribor as a hostage during World War II, he was proclaimed a People's Hero of Yugoslavia on 25 October 1943. The 6th Slovene National Liberation Struggle Shock Brigade, established in 1943, and a neighborhood in Celje were named after him.
