= Dolenja Vas, Prebold =

Place in Styria, Slovenia

Dolenja Vas
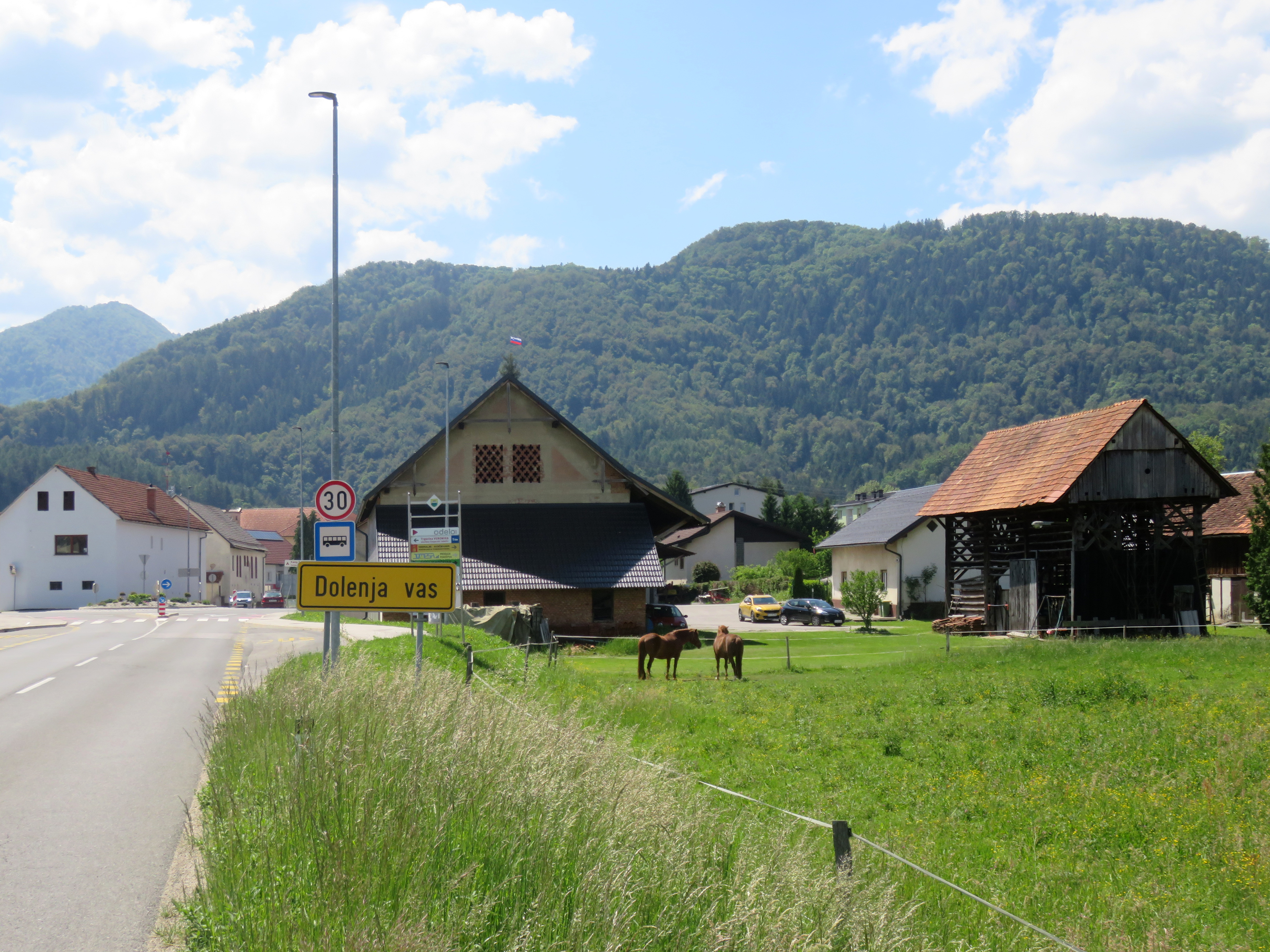

- Location in Slovenia
- Coordinates: 46°14′26.97″N 15°5′23.51″E
- Country: Slovenia
- Traditional region: Styria
- Statistical region: Savinja
- Municipality: Prebold

Area
  - Total: 1.08 km^{2} (0.42 sq mi)
- Elevation: 273.6 m (898 ft)

Population (2002)
  - Total: 498

Dolenja Vas (pronounced [dɔˈleːnja ˈʋaːs]; Slovene: Dolenja vas) is a roadside settlement in the Municipality of Prebold in east-central Slovenia. The area is part of the traditional region of Styria. The municipality is now included in the Savinja Statistical Region.

There are two small chapel-shrines in the settlement. One dates to 1725 and the other was built in the early 20th century.

== Notable residents ==
- Slavko Šlander
