= Mount Hum (Laško) =

Mountain in Slovenia

Hum
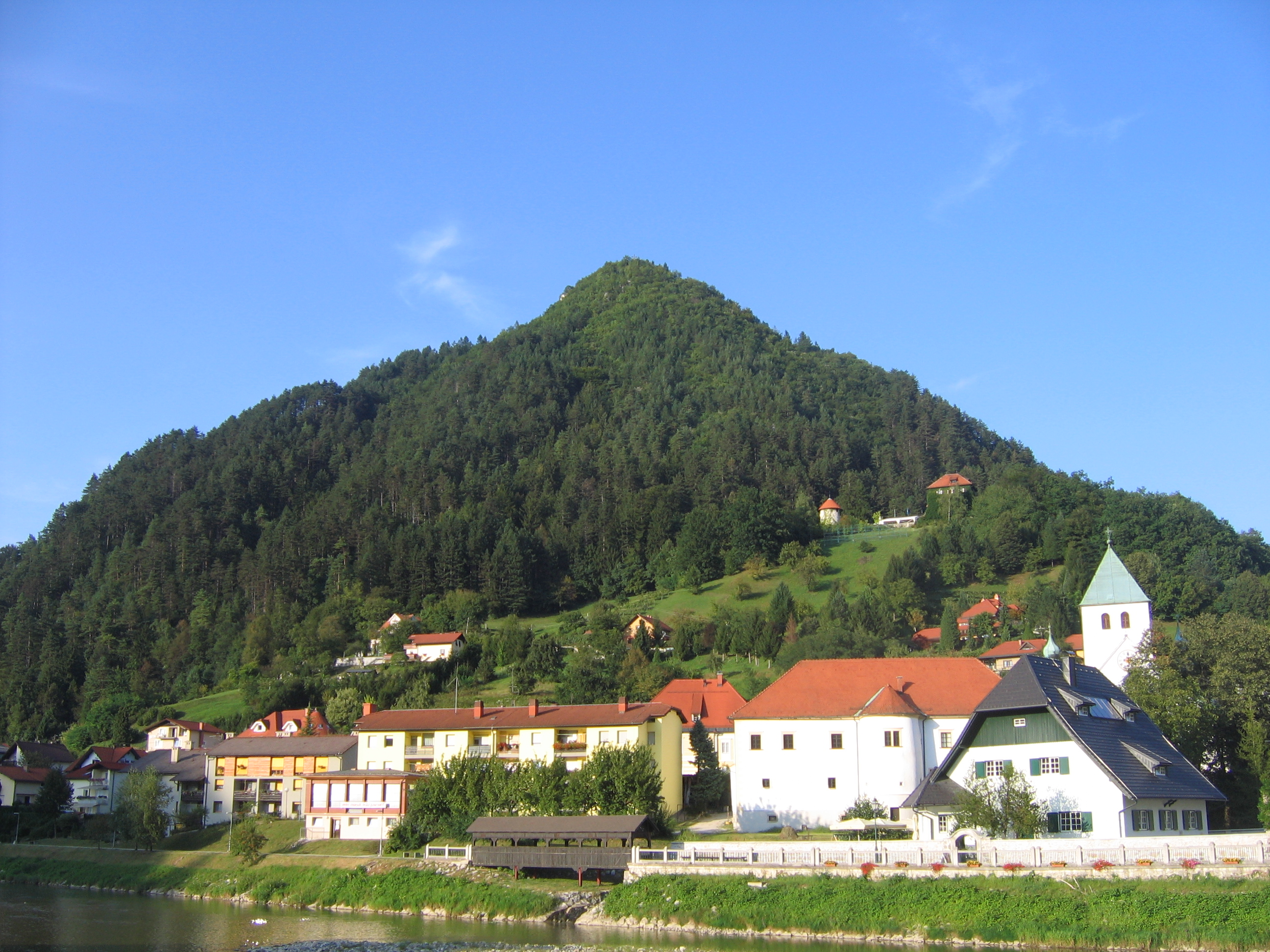
- Photo of Hum from Laško

Highest point
- Elevation: 583 m (1,913 ft)
- Prominence: 269 m (883 ft)
- Coordinates: 46°09′38″N 15°14′23″E

Geography
- Location within Slovenia
- Location: Laško, Slovenia

Climbing
- Easiest route: Hike (40 min)

Hum, 583-metre (1,913 ft) high and the most prominent peak of the Laško region, is situated on the Savinja river's left bank. For ages, its foothills have been giving a shelter to the old castle under which thermal water has been pumped from the springs. There is a wide view from Hum on to Laško and its surroundings.

== Flora ==
Hum is the growing place of many plant species, especially subalpine ones, the remains of the Pleistocene vegetation, like the hirsute rhododendron, yellow veronica, primula, mouse-ear hawkweed, Clusius gentian, houseleek, pink, etc. On the sunny side and in light deciduous forests, thermophile plants adapted to dry grounds can be found, for example daphne, smoke tree, holy grass, sessile oak, Solomon's seal, stonecrop, heath and others. Beside these, the following members of the other flore do grow in this region: butcher's broom, the lily of Carniola, black hellebore, honeysuckle, hacquetia, cyclamen, euphorbia, milkwort, helleborine, hart's tongue fern, cranesbill redbrown and many others.

Buttercup is the endemic plant of Hum, and quite a lot of plants have been protected there like Clusius gentian, primula, daphne, butcher's broom, and holly.

== Legend ==
A legend about Hum tells the story about Wild parsonage. By the forest footpath, there is a turning to the cave being exactly at the place where he got sunk. Black poacher burst into a rage because a beautiful girl did not become his wedding bride. He pounded the girl's house door, and it also sank. The girl with the buried treasure has still been waiting for a young lad to set her free.
