= Matke =

Matke Sveta Magdalena pri Preboldu (until 1955)
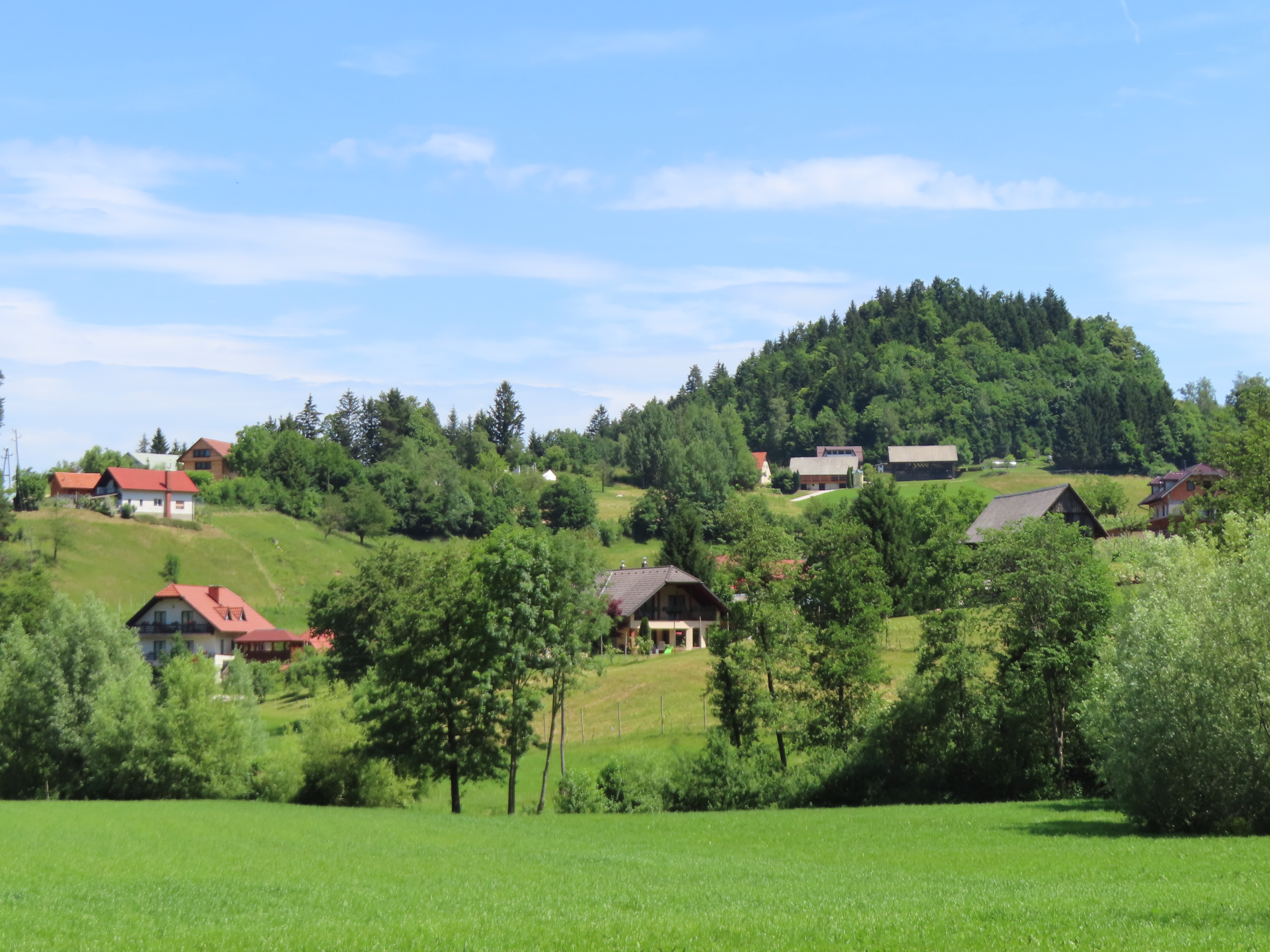

- Location in Slovenia
- Coordinates: 46°13′10.44″N 15°6′54.38″E
- Country: Slovenia
- Traditional region: Styria
- Statistical region: Savinja
- Municipality: Prebold

Area
  - Total: 7.66 km^{2} (2.96 sq mi)
- Elevation: 373.5 m (1,225 ft)

Population (2002)
  - Total: 347

Matke (pronounced [ˈmaːtkɛ]) is a settlement in the Municipality of Prebold in east-central Slovenia. It lies in the valley of Kolja Creek, a minor right tributary of the Savinja River, and the surrounding hills southeast of Prebold. The area is part of the traditional region of Styria. The municipality is now included in the Savinja Statistical Region.

== Name ==
The name of the settlement was changed from Sveta Magdalena pri Preboldu (literally, 'Saint Mary Magdalene near Prebold') to Matke in 1955. The name was changed on the basis of the 1948 Law on Names of Settlements and Designations of Squares, Streets, and Buildings as part of efforts by Slovenia's postwar communist government to remove religious elements from toponyms. The name Matke is an accusative plural form of the personal name Matko, derived from Matej 'Matthaeus', thus originally meaning 'Matko and his family'. Before it became the name of the entire settlement, Matke referred to only one of several hamlets in the settlement.

== Church ==
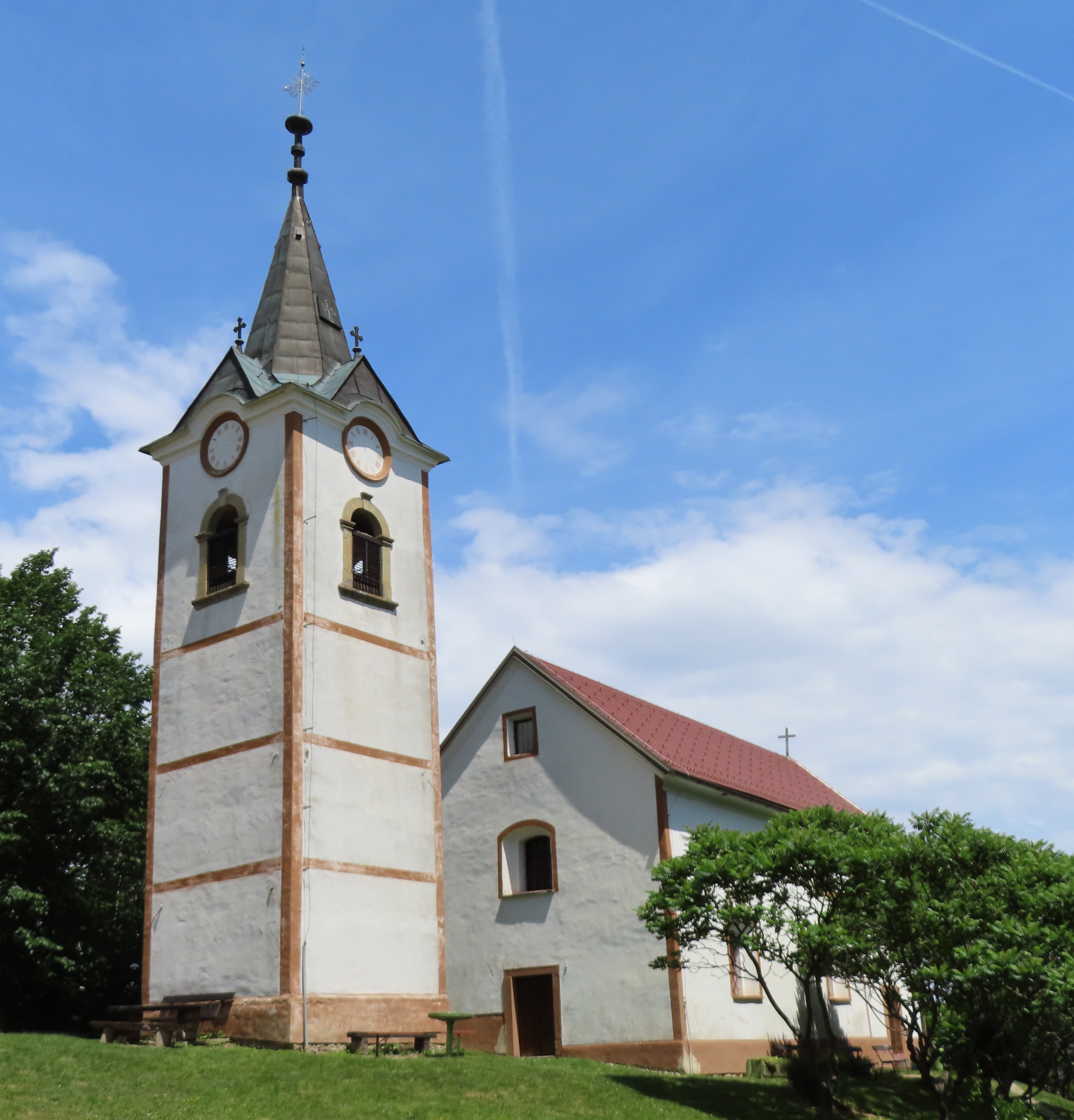
Saint Mary Magdalene Church

The local church, built on the top of Hom Hill east of the settlement, is dedicated to Mary Magdalene and belongs to the Parish of Prebold. It is a single-nave church dating to the second half of the 14th century with a free-standing belfry built in 1725.
