= Sveti Lovrenc, Prebold =

Sveti Lovrenc Gorenja vas pri Preboldu (1955–1991)
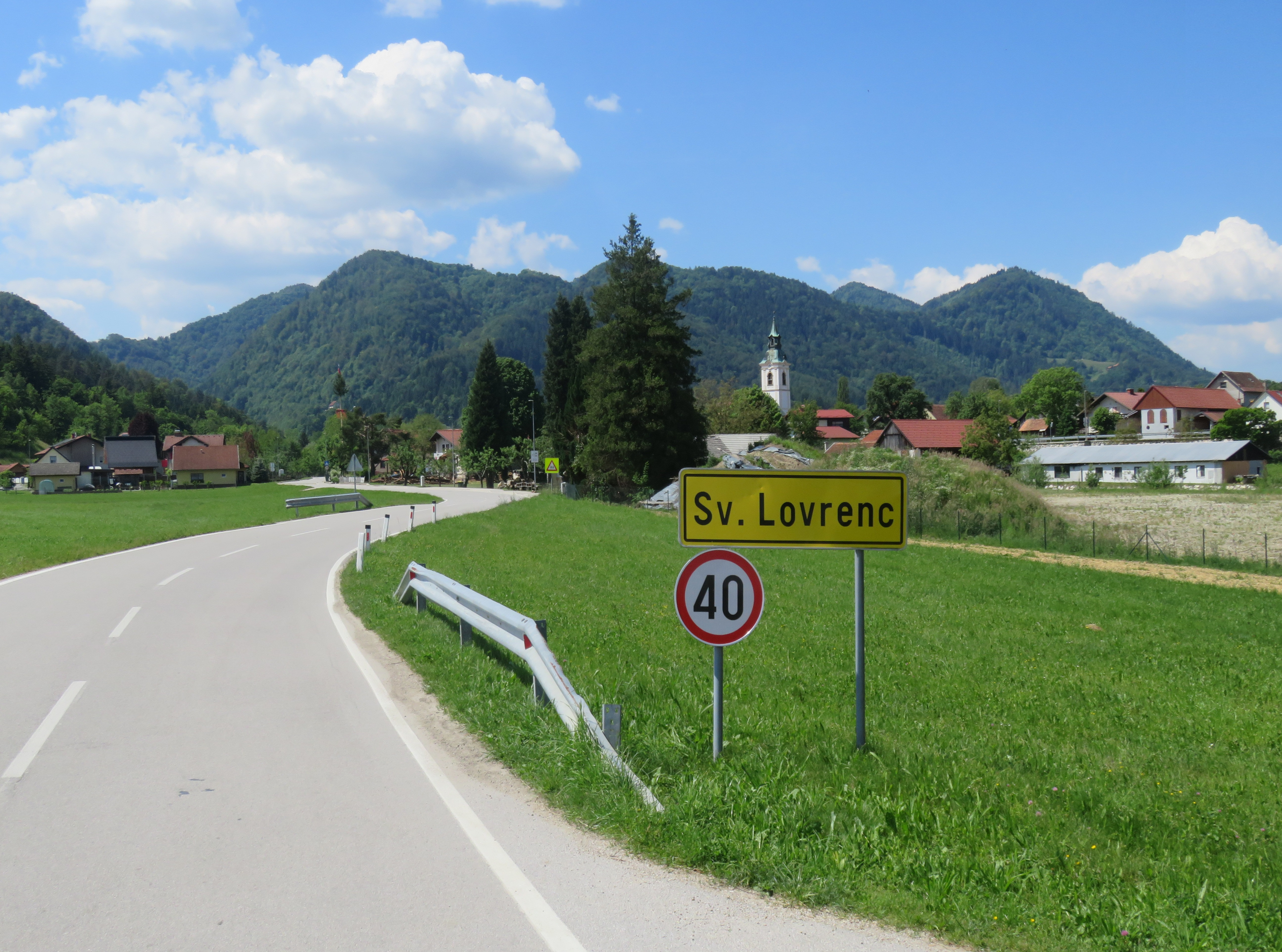

- Location in Slovenia
- Coordinates: 46°14′11.68″N 15°6′29.3″E
- Country: Slovenia
- Traditional region: Styria
- Statistical region: Savinja
- Municipality: Prebold

Area
  - Total: 2.4 km^{2} (0.93 sq mi)
- Elevation: 282.1 m (926 ft)

Population (2002)
  - Total: 349

Sveti Lovrenc (pronounced [ˈsʋèːti ˈlɔ́ːwɾɛnts]) is a village in the Municipality of Prebold in east-central Slovenia. The area is part of the traditional region of Styria. The municipality is now included in the Savinja Statistical Region.

== Name ==
The name of the settlement was changed from Sveti Lovrenc pri Preboldu (literally, 'Saint Lawrence near Prebold') to Gorenja Vas pri Preboldu (literally, 'upper village near Prebold') in 1955. The name was changed on the basis of the 1948 Law on Names of Settlements and Designations of Squares, Streets, and Buildings as part of efforts by Slovenia's postwar communist government to remove religious elements from toponyms. The name Sveti Lovrenc was restored in 1991.

== Church ==
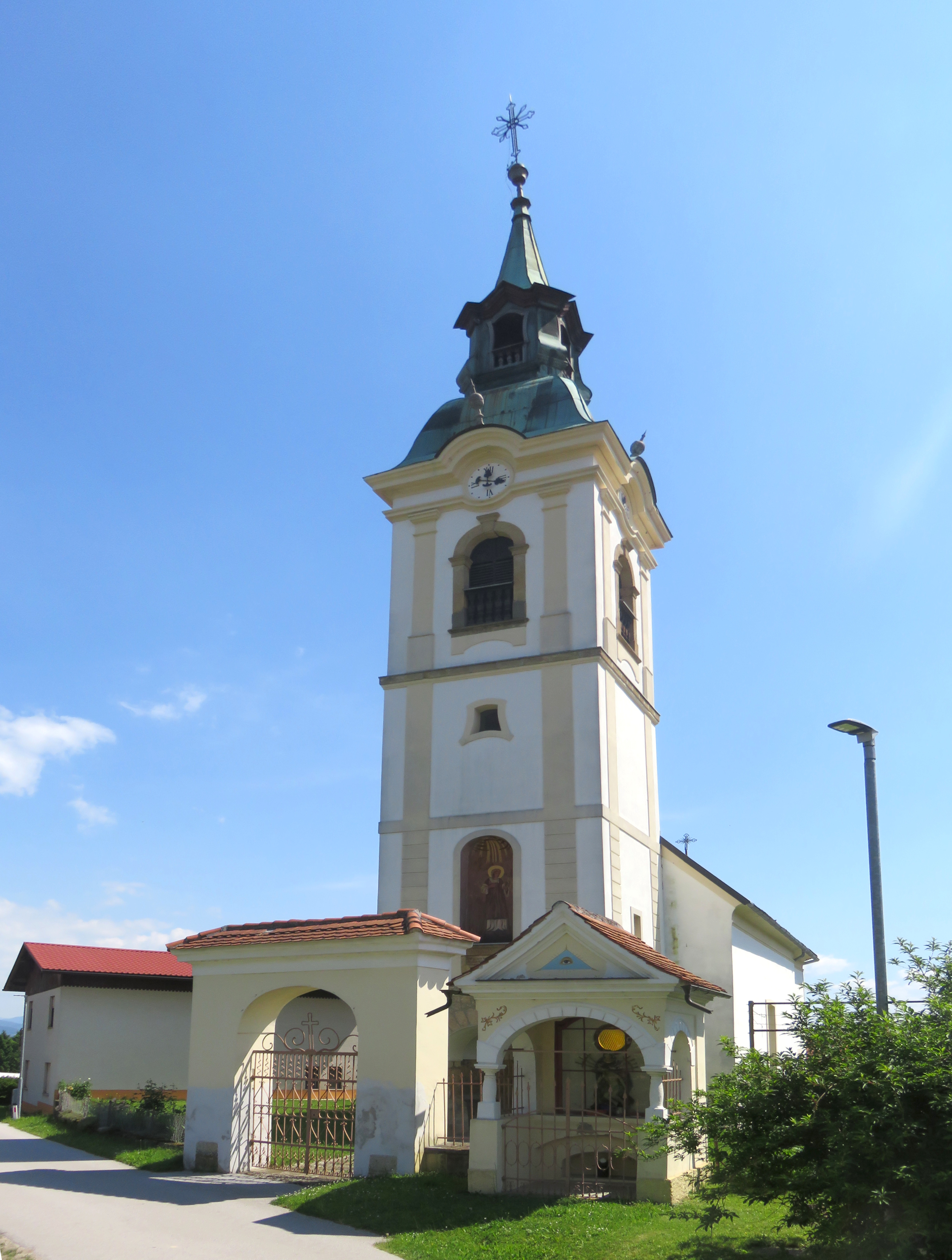
Saint Lawrence's Church

The local church, from which the village gets its name, is dedicated to Saint Lawrence and belongs to the Parish of Prebold. It was first mentioned in written documents dating to 1247. It was restyled in the 19th century, but the nave is still the original Romanesque structure.
