= Laško =

- Town
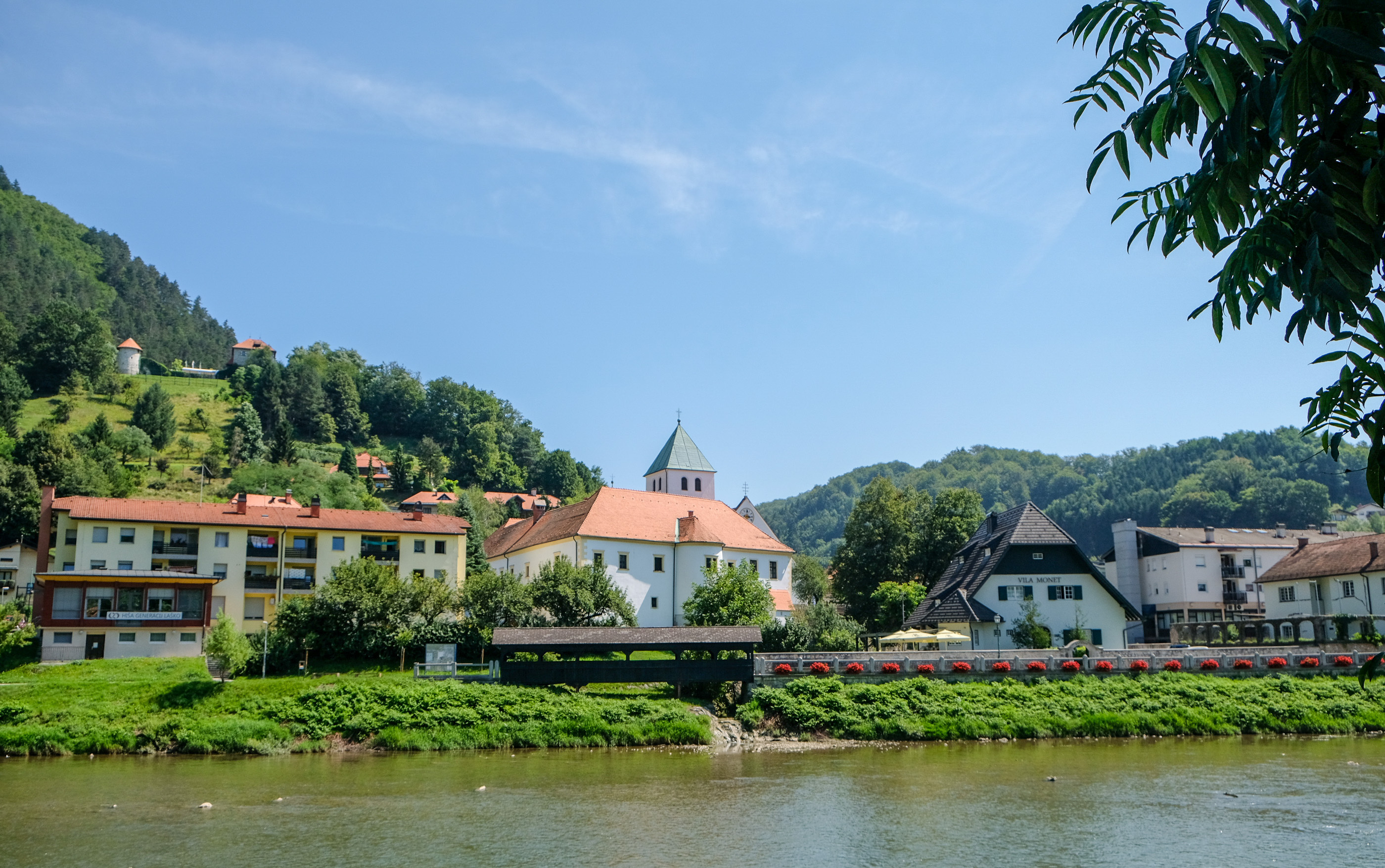
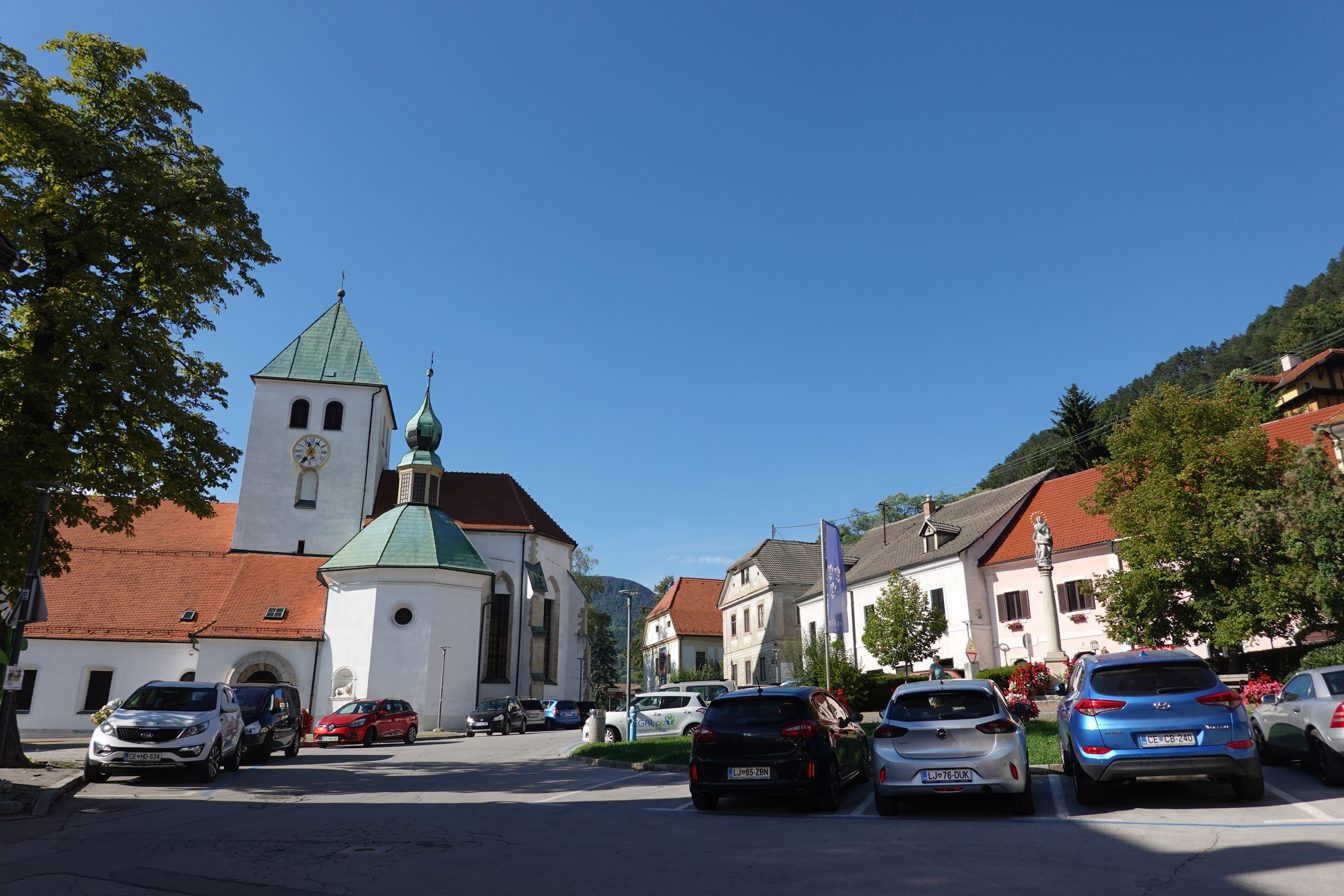
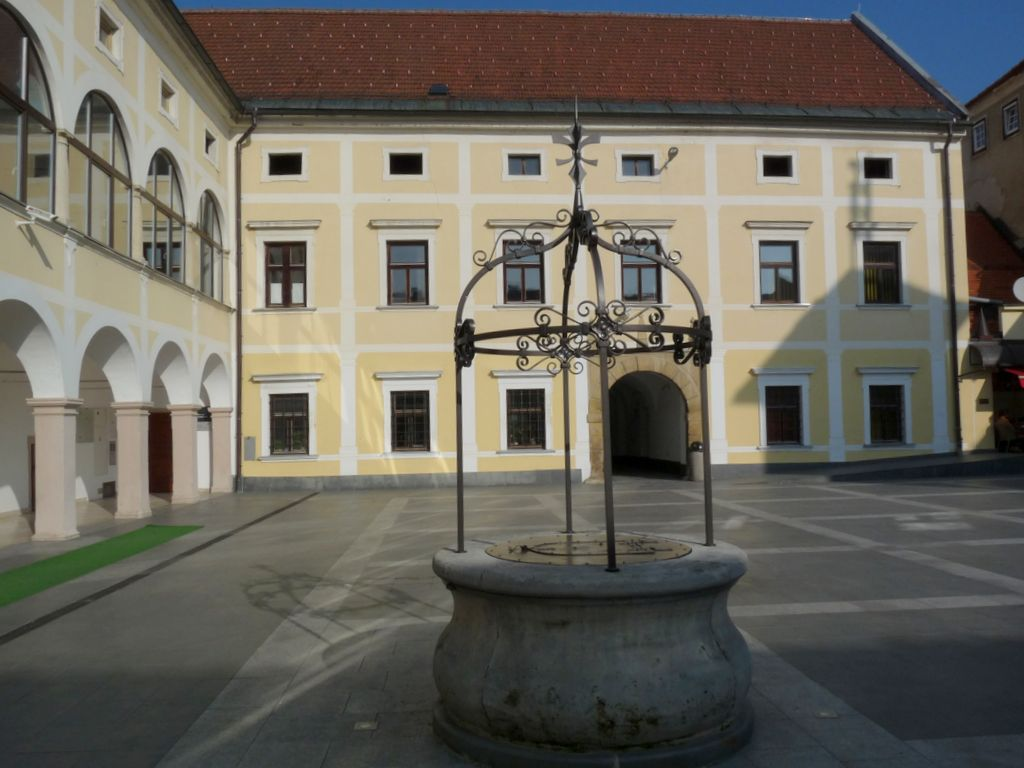
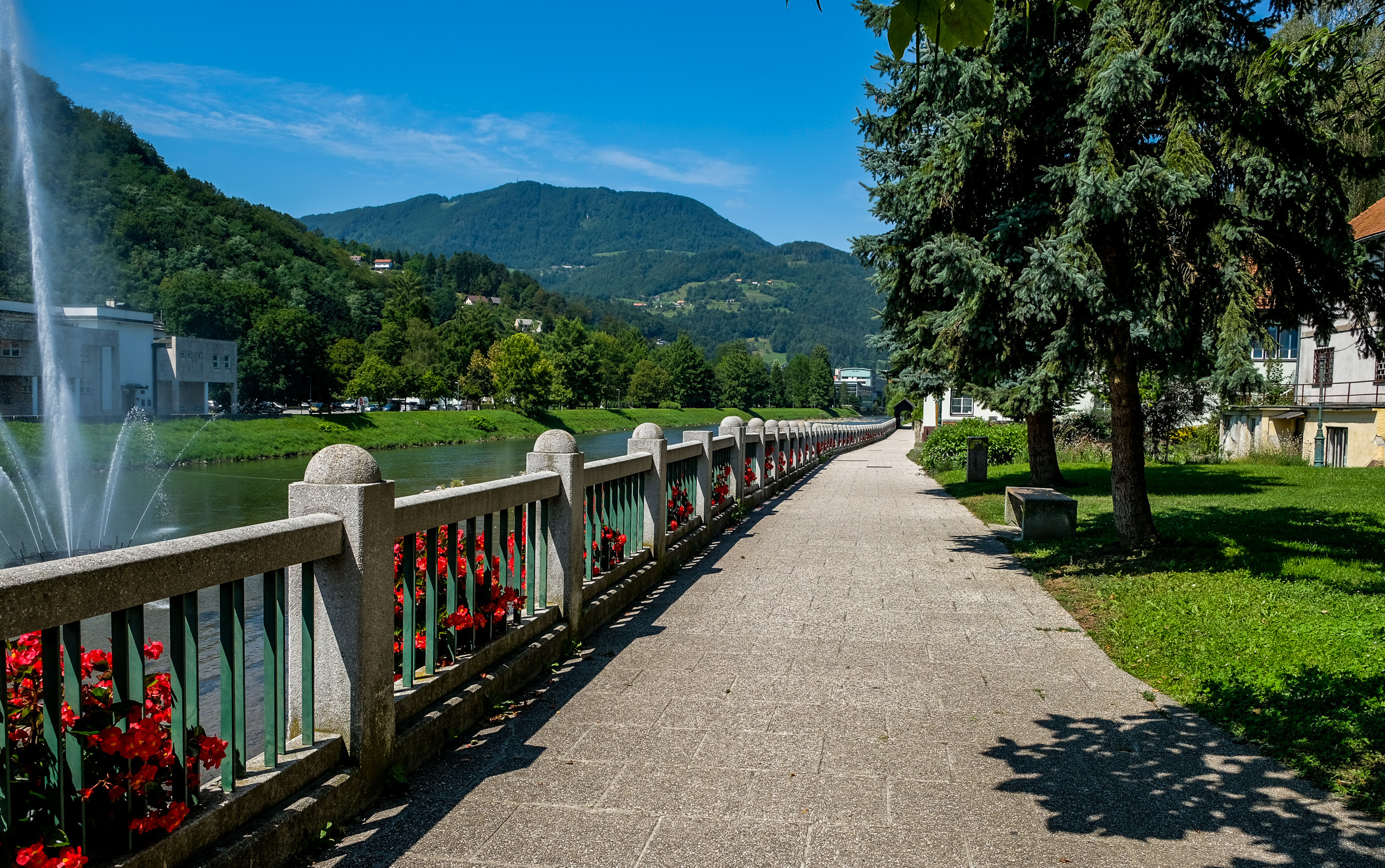
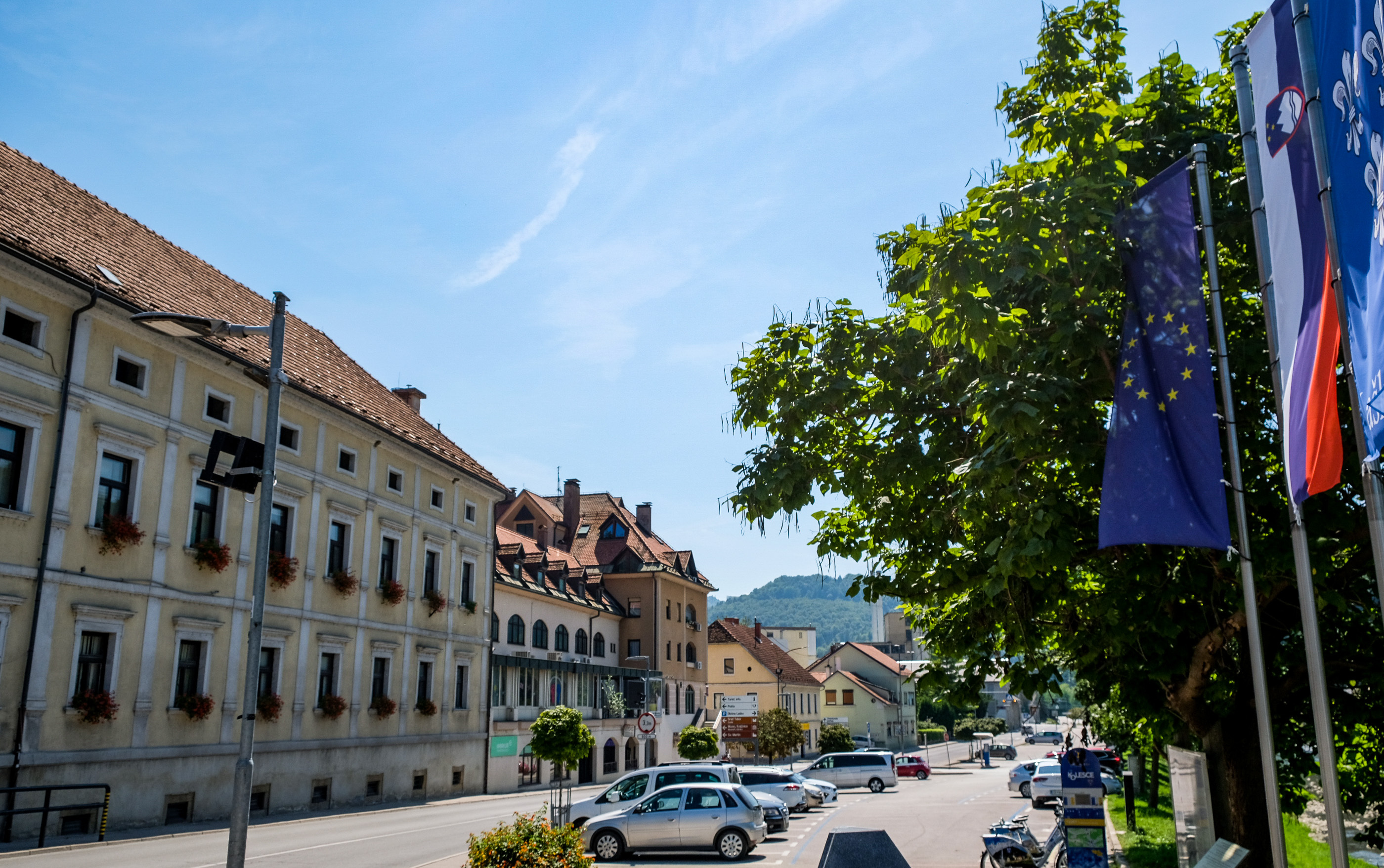
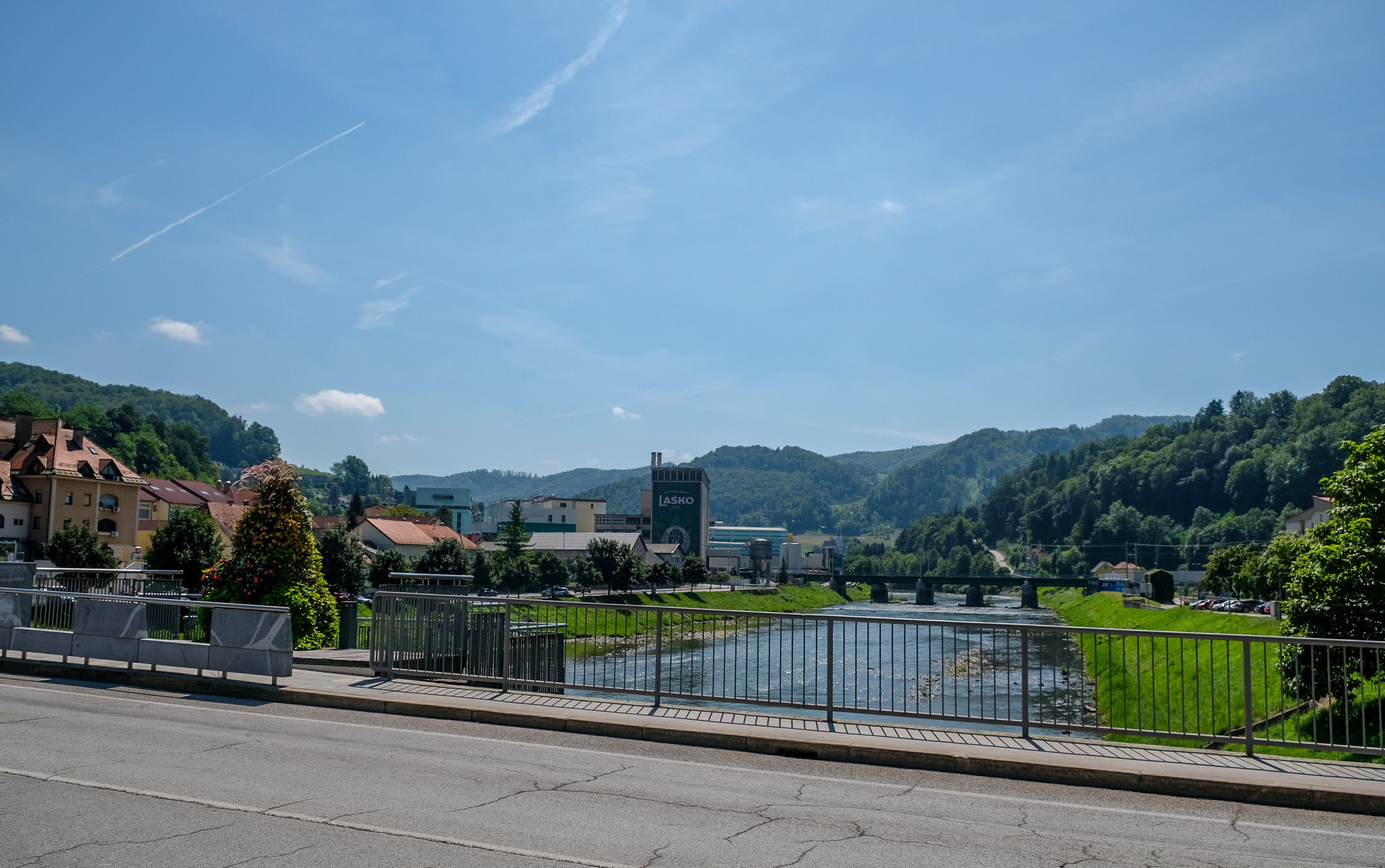
- From top, left to right: Laško with the Castle, Main square with St. Martin's Church, Courtyard well, Riverside promenade, Riverside buildings, View from the bridge and Laško Brewery

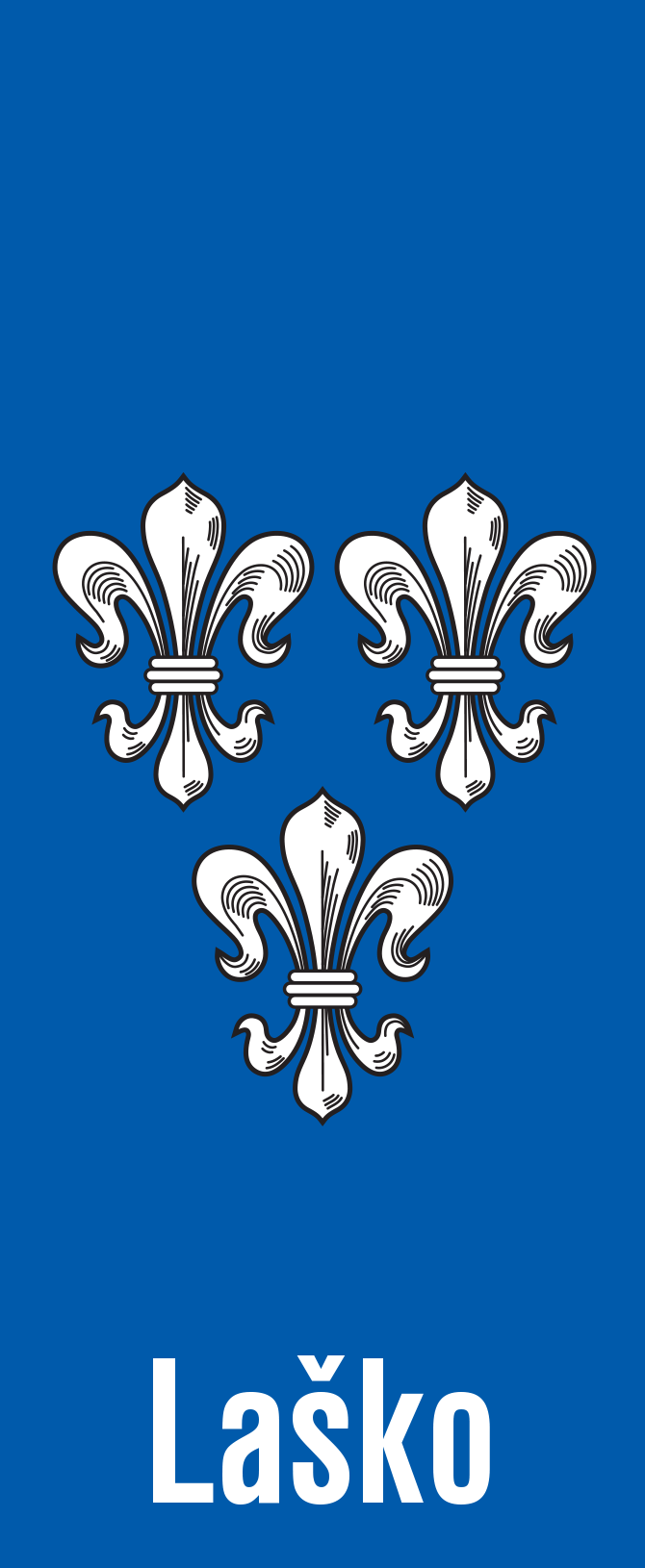
- Flag Coat of arms

- Location in Slovenia
- Coordinates: 46°9′22.69″N 15°14′19.02″E
- Country: Slovenia
- Traditional region: Styria
- Statistical region: Savinja
- Municipality: Laško

Area
  - Total: 3.30 km^{2} (1.27 sq mi)
- Elevation: 259.9 m (853 ft)

Population (2025)
  - Total: 3,356
- Postal code: 3270 Laško
- Vehicle registration: CE
- Climate: Cfb

Laško (pronounced [ˈláːʃkɔ]; German: Tüffer) is a spa town in eastern Slovenia. It is the seat of the Municipality of Laško. The area is part of the traditional region of Styria. The municipality is now included in the Savinja Statistical Region. The town is located at the foothills of Hum Hill on the Savinja River. It was first mentioned in written documents dating to 1227 and was granted town privileges in 1927. It is known to have been settled since the Iron Age and Roman archaeological finds are common in the area, though the precise location of the Roman settlement is not known. Today the town is best known for its annual Festival of Beer & Flowers (Pivo - Cvetje) and the local Laško Brewery, the largest brewery in the country. In 2010, Laško was heavily affected by flooding. The town's coat of arms depicts three white fleurs-de-lis on a blue field.

== Name ==
Laško was attested in written sources in 1145 under the German name Tyver (and as Tyvre in 1182, Tyuer in 1342, and Tyffer in 1461). The name de Lasca was attested in 1483. The Slovene name is derived from *Laško selo 'Vlach village'; the first element comes from Slavic *Vȍlxъ, referring to the Romanized Celtic population or to other Romance speakers. The Slovene name presumably refers to pre-Slavic ethnic settlement or to medieval settlers from a Romance-speaking area, and it predates the arrival of Italian settlers from the Bergamo area that arrived in Laško after 1554. The German name Tüffer is believed to derive from Slavic deber 'river strait', referring to the narrowing of the Savinja River. This name is still found in the village of Debro, which lies immediately upriver from Laško and was once known in German as Ober Tüffer (literally, 'upper Tüffer').

== History ==
Archaeological finds confirm prehistoric settlement in the Laško area. Stone axes discovered on the southeast slope below the old castle date back to the eighth century BC. Two silver Celtic coins have been found in Laško, and several stone funerary monuments dating to the Roman era have been found. The Roman road from Celeia to Zidani Most and onward to Neviodunum passed through Laško.

One of the oldest buildings in Laško is called Štok or Weixelberger Manor (Slovene: Weixelberški dvor). The property dates back to the mid-15th century, with records showing that it was given to Nikolaj Behaim by the Counts of Celje in 1437. It was acquired by Sigismund Weixelberger before 1506 and he built the manor at the site.

At the end of the 15th century Laško was targeted in Ottoman attacks and was burned at least once. Peasant revolts also took place in the town in 1515 and in 1635. Laško was struck by plague outbreaks several times, especially in 1646 and 1647.

Schooling was established in Laško by around 1600. A lower primary school was set up under Empress Maria Theresa in the 18th century. The oldest large-scale industry in Laško dates back to the 18th century. A major fire devastated Laško in 1840, destroying half of the houses in the town. High water on the Savinja River also destroyed the town's bridge several times in the mid-19th century. The railroad reached Laško in 1849. A leather factory was established in 1929, and a textile factory in 1934.

Historical population
Year	Pop.	±%
1948	1,326	—
1953	1,523	+14.9%
1961	1,994	+30.9%
1971	2,236	+12.1%
1981	2,328	+4.1%
1991	3,644	+56.5%
2002	3,408	−6.5%
2011	3,456	+1.4%
2021	3,284	−5.0%
Population size may be affected by changes in administrative divisions.

=== Mass graves ===
Laško is the site of two known mass graves from the period immediately after the Second World War. The Funeral Chapel Mass Grave (Slovene: Grobišče pri pokopališki vežici) is located west of the Laško Brewery, under the funeral chapel outside the east wall of the town cemetery. The grave contains the remains of Croatian prisoners of war that were murdered after the war. The Cemetery Mass Grave (Grobišče na pokopališču) is located in an unmarked part of the town cemetery. The grave contains the remains of Croatian victims that were discovered during excavations and reburied.

== Castle ==
The local castle, known as Tabor Castle, dates to the 12th century, although it was first mentioned in written sources dating to 1265. It was burned down during Ottoman Raids in the late 15th century and was extended in the 16th century.

== Brewery ==
Brewing in the town dates back to 1817, when the bell-maker Ivan Steinmetz set up a brewery there. The Laško Brewery was sold to Heineken in 2016.

== Church ==
The parish church in the settlement is dedicated to Saint Martin and belongs to the Roman Catholic Diocese of Celje. It is a Romanesque building dating to the 13th century with various later additions and adaptations.

== Spa ==
The healing properties of the local waters have been known since antiquity. Laško developed as a health resort towards the end of the 19th century.

In 1818 a report appeared in a Graz newspaper about the Laško springs. The water temperature was measured at 35 °C (95 °F) and the establishment of a health spa was announced. An engineer named Rödel began to work systematically on the springs during the construction of the railway line. Work progressed from September 1852, when he purchased the land, until May 1854, when he ceremoniously opened the spa. The three springs were each given a name: the Emperor's Spring, Franz's Spring, and Joseph's Spring. The spa was given the name Kaiser Franz Josef Bad, after Emperor Franz Joseph I of Austria. Along with a building with a pool, Rödel also rearranged the nearby mill and built a luxurious mansion.

In 1857 the spa was purchased by a Viennese professor and cosmopolitan named Stein, who invited the cream of Viennese society to the health spa. For this purpose he built an extension onto the spa building with a dance hall and planted a park. He also took care of his guests' social life. Stein was later forced to sell the spa. The spa's reputation returned under a later owner named Gunkel, who radically renovated it and in 1882 built his own hydroelectric power plant, the first on Slovene soil, which lit up most of the buildings and the whole park. In cooperation with the brewery, they began to brew thermal beer. During World War I the spa played the role of a military hospital. The property was left in disrepair after the war, but was partly renovated in 1923. Later the spa passed into the hands of the Pensions Institute (Pokojninski zavod) and the Central Office for Workers' Insurance (Osrednji urad za zavarovanje delavcev).

In October 1953, the spa was registered as a medical rehabilitation centre. Further development mainly followed the needs of the healthcare service and to a large degree it was the fruit of cooperation with the orthopedic (later neurological, traumatology, and neurosurgical) clinics in Ljubljana, regional hospitals, and health centres across Slovenia.

The Laško Thermal Spa Resort is becoming one of the most important health spas and tourist centres in Slovenia.
