= Prebold =

Prebold Šempavel (locally) Sveti Pavel pri Preboldu (until 1952)
- Settlement
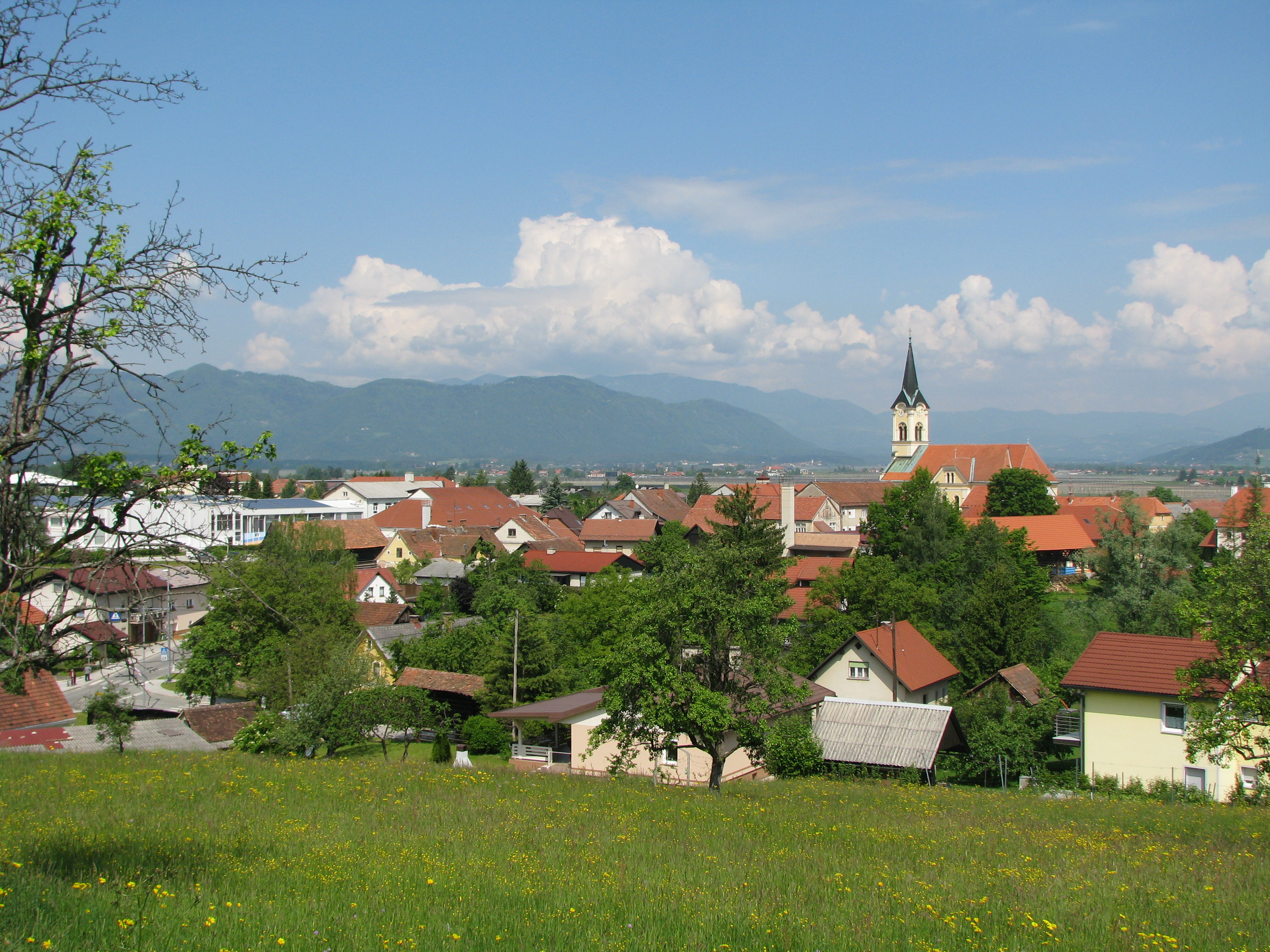

- Location of the settlement of Prebold in Slovenia
- Coordinates: 46°14′13″N 15°05′31″E
- Country: Slovenia
- Traditional region: Styria
- Statistical region: Savinja
- Municipality: Prebold
- Elevation: 278.7 m (914 ft)

Population (2002)
  - Total: 1,605
- Time zone: UTC+01 (CET)
  - Summer (DST): UTC+02 (CEST)
- Postal code: 3312 Prebold

Prebold (pronounced [ˈpɾeːbɔlt]) is a settlement in central Slovenia. It is the seat of the Municipality of Prebold. It lies on the edge of the lower Savinja Valley at the northern edge of the Sava Hills west of Celje. The area is part of the traditional region of Styria. The municipality is now included in the Savinja Statistical Region.

== Name ==
The name of the settlement was changed from Sveti Pavel pri Preboldu (literally, 'Saint Paul near Prebold') to Prebold in 1952. The name was changed on the basis of the 1948 Law on Names of Settlements and Designations of Squares, Streets, and Buildings as part of efforts by Slovenia's postwar communist government to remove religious elements from toponyms. At the time, a proposal was also made for the settlement to be renamed Šlandrovo (after the Slovenian communist Slavko Šlander), but it was not carried through. The settlement is also locally known as Šempavel (< Šent Pavel 'Saint Paul'). The name Sveti Pavel is derived from the church in the settlement, and the name Prebold is believed to be derived from German Prewald, in turn borrowed from Slovene preval 'mountain pass'. The name Prebold formerly referred to a part of the settlement known today as Graščina, but may have originally referred to the Vrhe Pass on the route from Prebold to Trbovlje.

== Church ==
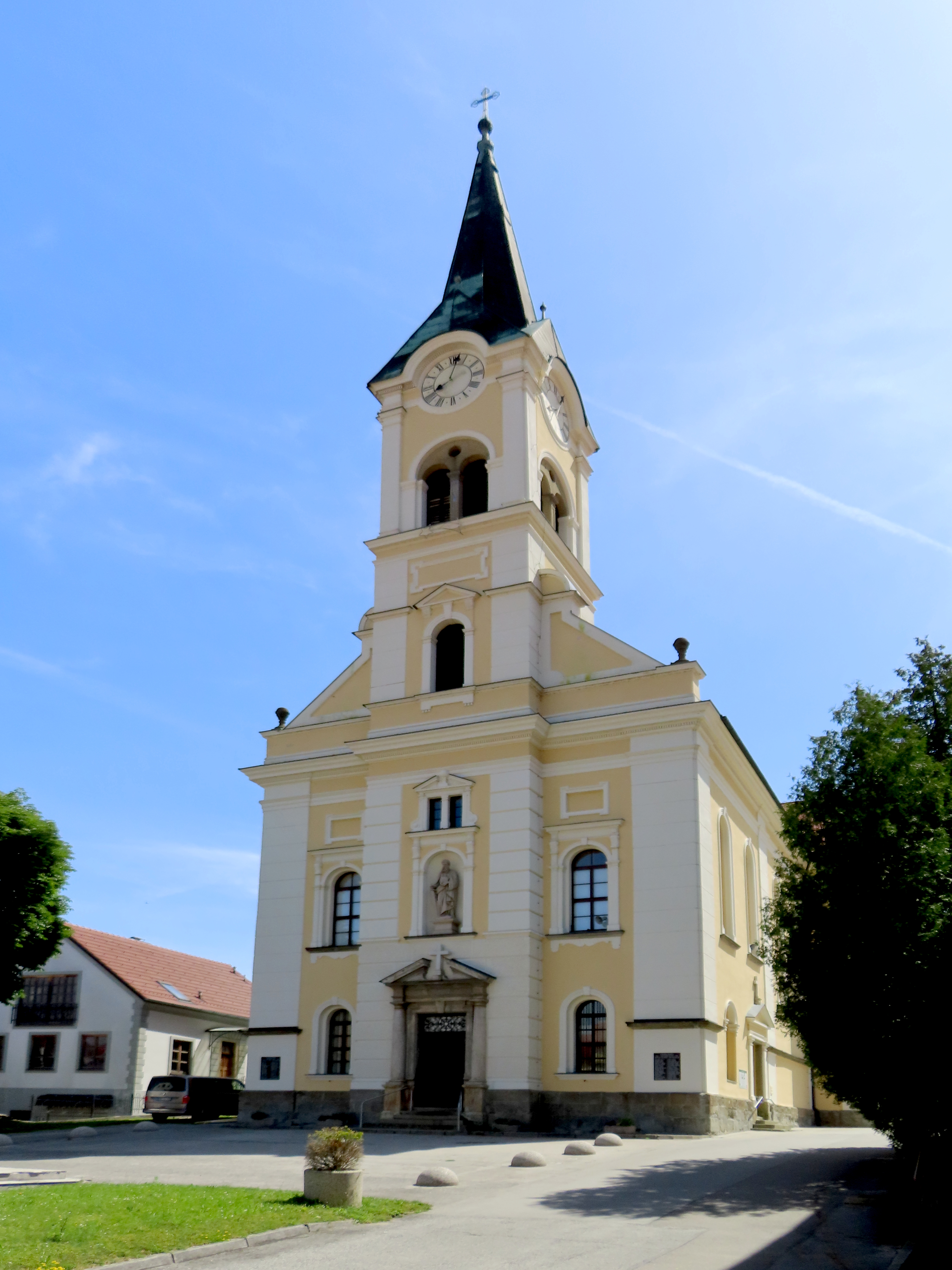
Saint Paul's Church

The parish church in the settlement is dedicated to Saint Paul and belongs to the Roman Catholic Diocese of Celje. It was built in 1898 on the site of a 14th-century church.

== Nature ==
The moth Adscita statices has been recorded in Prebold.
