= Trboje =

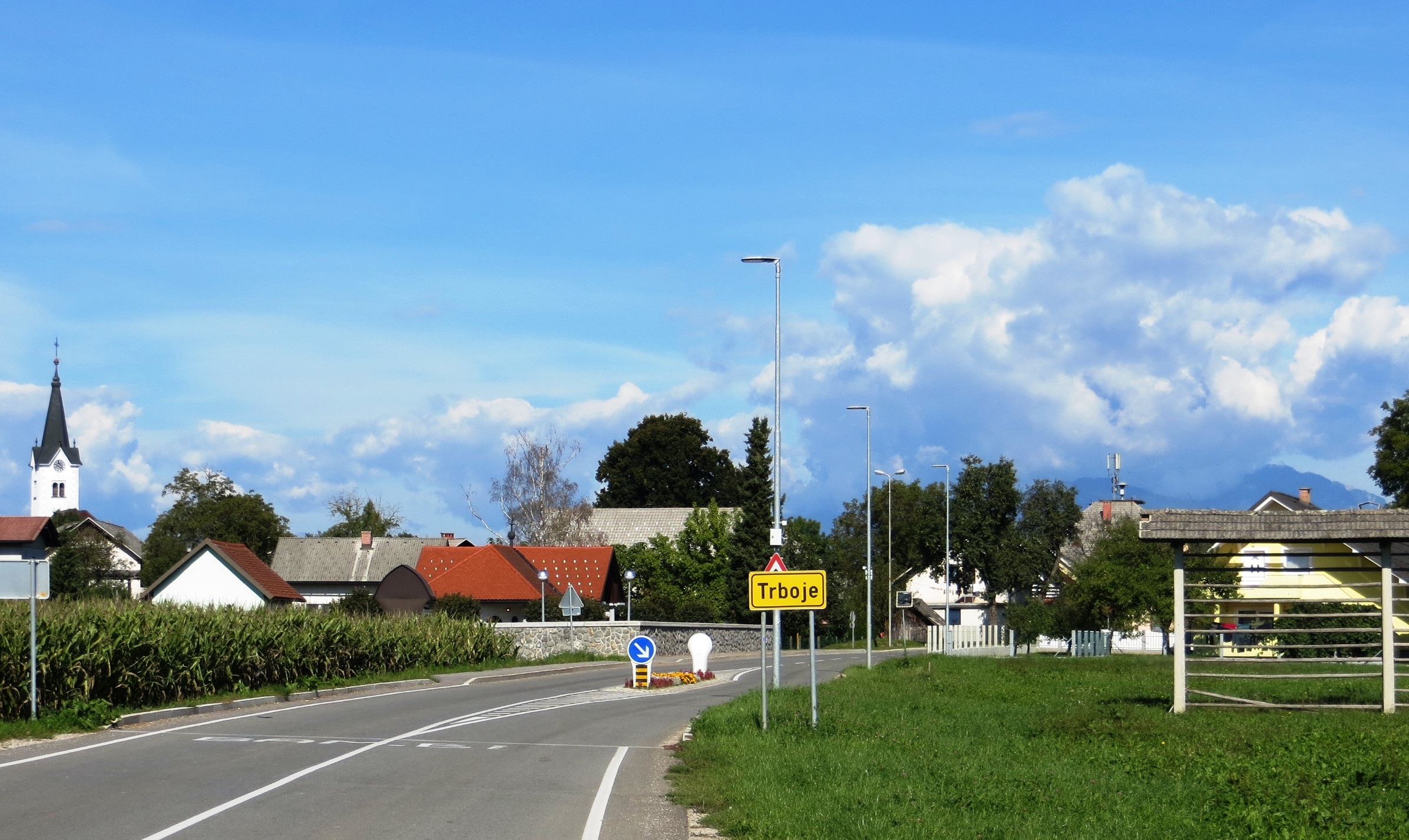

- Location in Slovenia
- Coordinates: 46°11′47.23″N 14°24′52.16″E
- Country: Slovenia
- Traditional Region: Upper Carniola
- Statistical region: Upper Carniola
- Municipality: Šenčur
- Elevation: 359.6 m (1,180 ft)

Population (2002)
  - Total: 551

Trboje (pronounced [təɾˈboːjɛ]; German: Terboje) is a village in the Municipality of Šenčur in the Upper Carniola region of Slovenia. It lies east of Lake Trboje.

== Geography ==
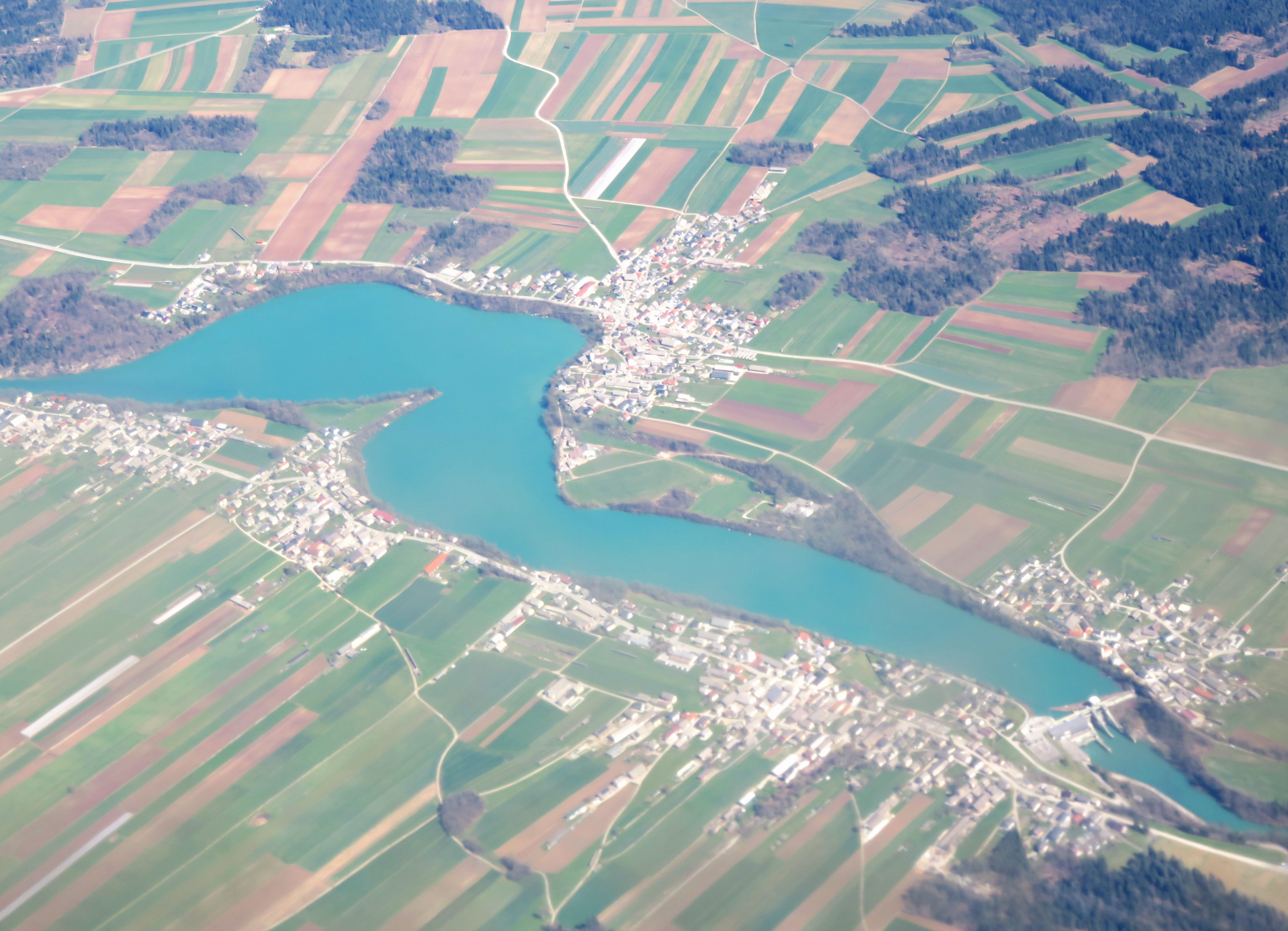
Lake Trboje

Trboje lies on the left bank of the Sava River along the road from Kranj to Smlednik. The soil in the area is sandy, and there are fields in the east part of the settlement toward Smlednik and Voklo. The Sava River was dammed in 1986, when the Mavčiče Hydroelectric Plant was built. The reservoir that was created is known as Lake Trboje.

== Name ==
Trboje was attested in written records in 1118 as Trebesbach and Trebespach (and as Treffpach in 1313, Trespach in 1436, Treboyach in 1436, Triboyan in 1483, and Threwoiach in 1597). The origin of the name is unclear, but may be derived through haplology from *Trěbobǫďe selo 'Trěbobǫdъ's village', referring to an early settler. If so, the originally neuter adjective later became a plural noun. Theories deriving the name from the verb *trěbiti 'to clear (cut)' are less likely. In the past the German name was Terboje.

== History ==
Most of the village was burned in a fire in 1883, destroying the church and 60 houses, which were later rebuilt. The village was also heavily damaged in an 1895 earthquake.

== Church ==
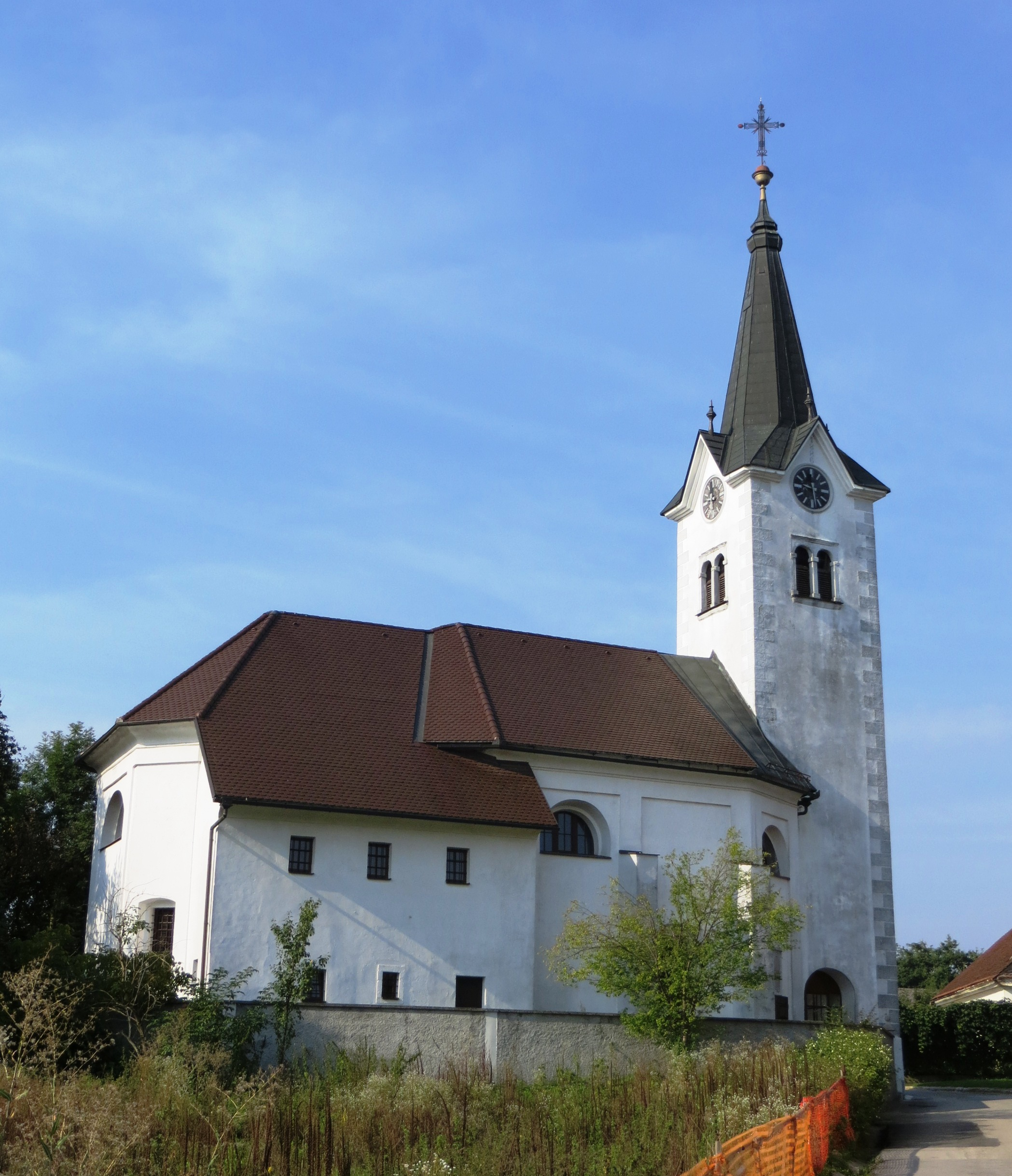
Assumption Church

The church in the village is dedicated to the Assumption of Mary. It is a Baroque structure dating from 1743 (the year is carved on the exterior wall of the chancel). The church originally belonged to the Parish of Smlednik, was a quasi-parish from 1785 to 1795, and only a chapelry from 1795 to 1809. The church burned in 1883 and was then damaged in the 1895 Ljubljana earthquake, after which it was renovated. It was not elevated to parish status until 1912. Oral tradition states that the church was once a pilgrimage destination. The main altar features a statue of Mary holding the infant Jesus; the left side altar is dedicated to Saint Nicholas, and the right side altar to the Adoration of the Magi. The church contains paintings by Leopold Layer (1752–1828) and the bell tower contains four bells.

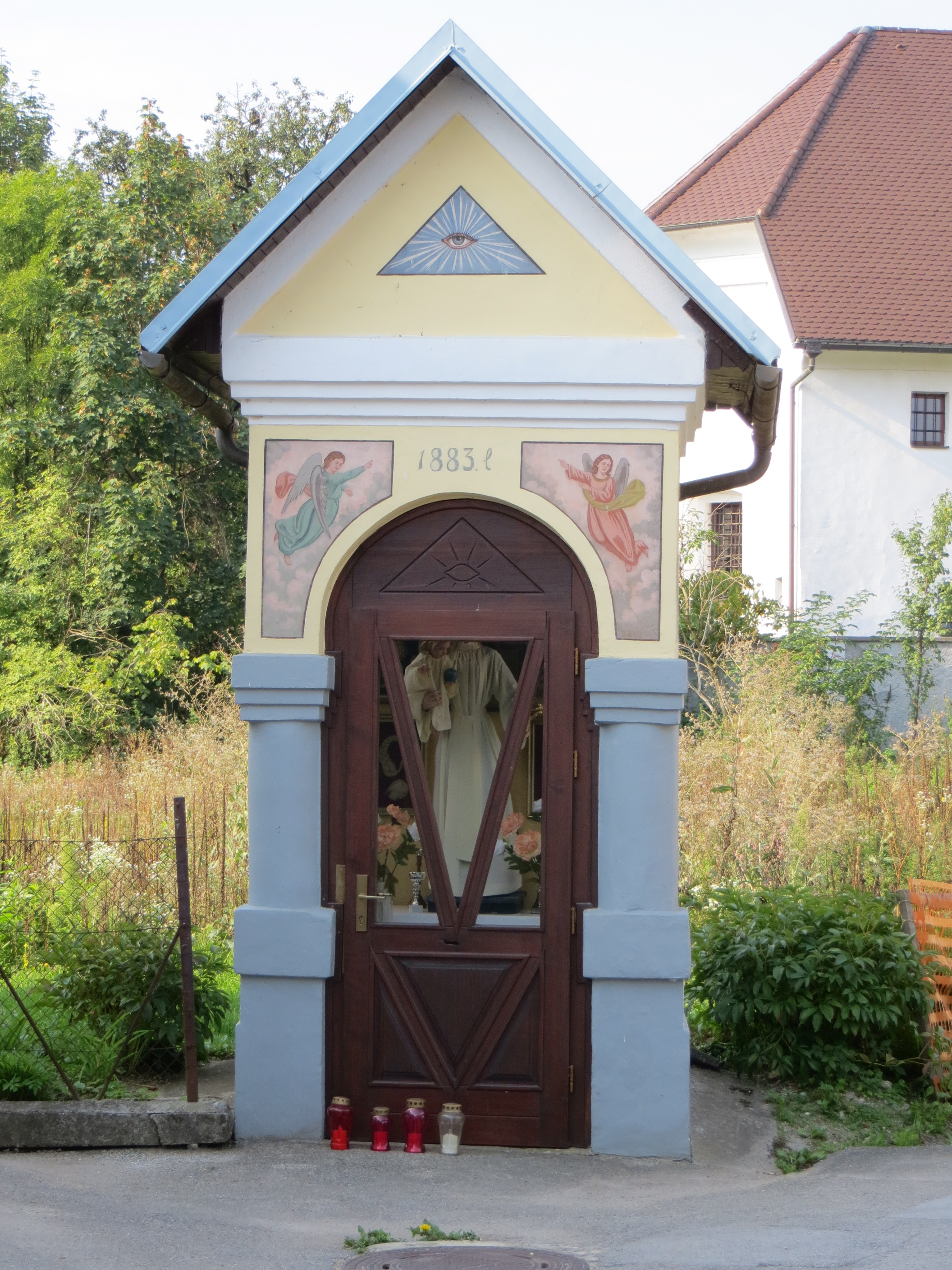
Chapel-shrine below church

A chapel-shrine below the church in the village is dedicated to the Virgin Mary and contains a statue from the old church. The statue was adorned with various gifts, also displayed in the shrine, when requests to the Virgin Mary were fulfilled. Two additional shrines—a triangular masonry shrine in the middle of the village, and the Burgar shrine outside the village—are noteworthy for their paintings.

== Notable people ==
Notable people that were born or lived in Trboje include:

- Josip Tičar (1875–1946), healthcare and hiking specialist
- Valentin Žun (1873–1918), lawyer and economist
