= Jama, Kranj =

Jama
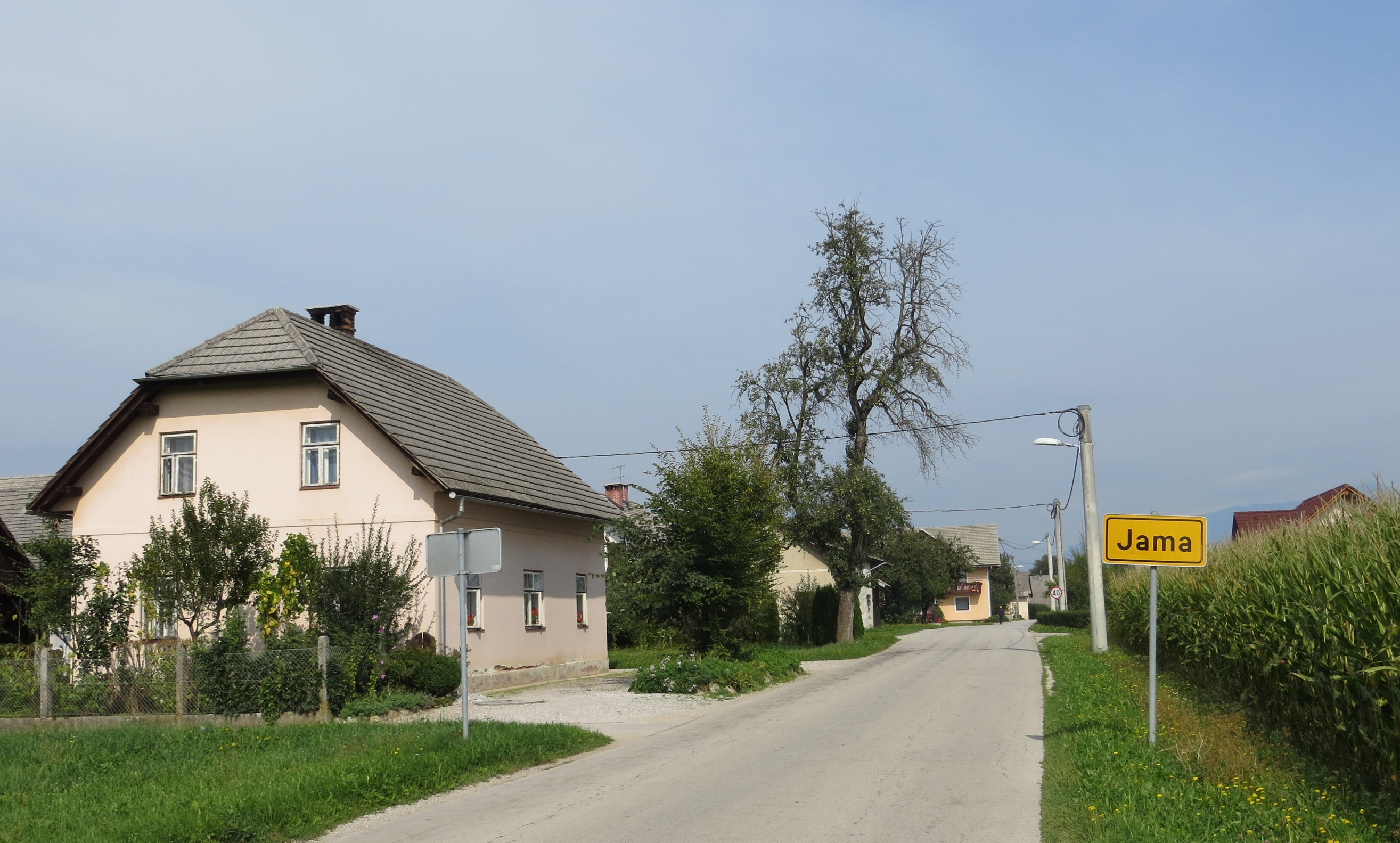

- Location in Slovenia
- Coordinates: 46°11′49.55″N 14°23′59.42″E
- Country: Slovenia
- Traditional region: Upper Carniola
- Statistical region: Upper Carniola
- Municipality: Kranj

Area
  - Total: 1.19 km^{2} (0.46 sq mi)
- Elevation: 365.2 m (1,198 ft)

Population (2002)
  - Total: 202

Jama (pronounced [ˈjaːma]) is a village on the right bank of the Sava River in the Municipality of Kranj in the Upper Carniola region of Slovenia.

== Geography ==
Jama stands above Lake Trboje—the reservoir of the Mavčiče Hydroelectric Plant, which was created in 1986—and the now-submerged Zarica Gorge. The gorge is composed of conglomerate rock, which was used to make millstones. A cave known as Ulrich's Grotto (Slovene: Urhov kevder) lies below the village in the former gorge. The cave is 8 meters (26 ft) long.

== Name ==
Jama was attested in historical sources as Luͦg in 1291, Lug in 1383, Ernluͤg in 1392, and Lueg in 1497, among other variations. The historical German name (cf. Old High German luog 'cave, den') and the modern Slovene name Jama (literally, 'cave') refer to the local geography.

== Church ==
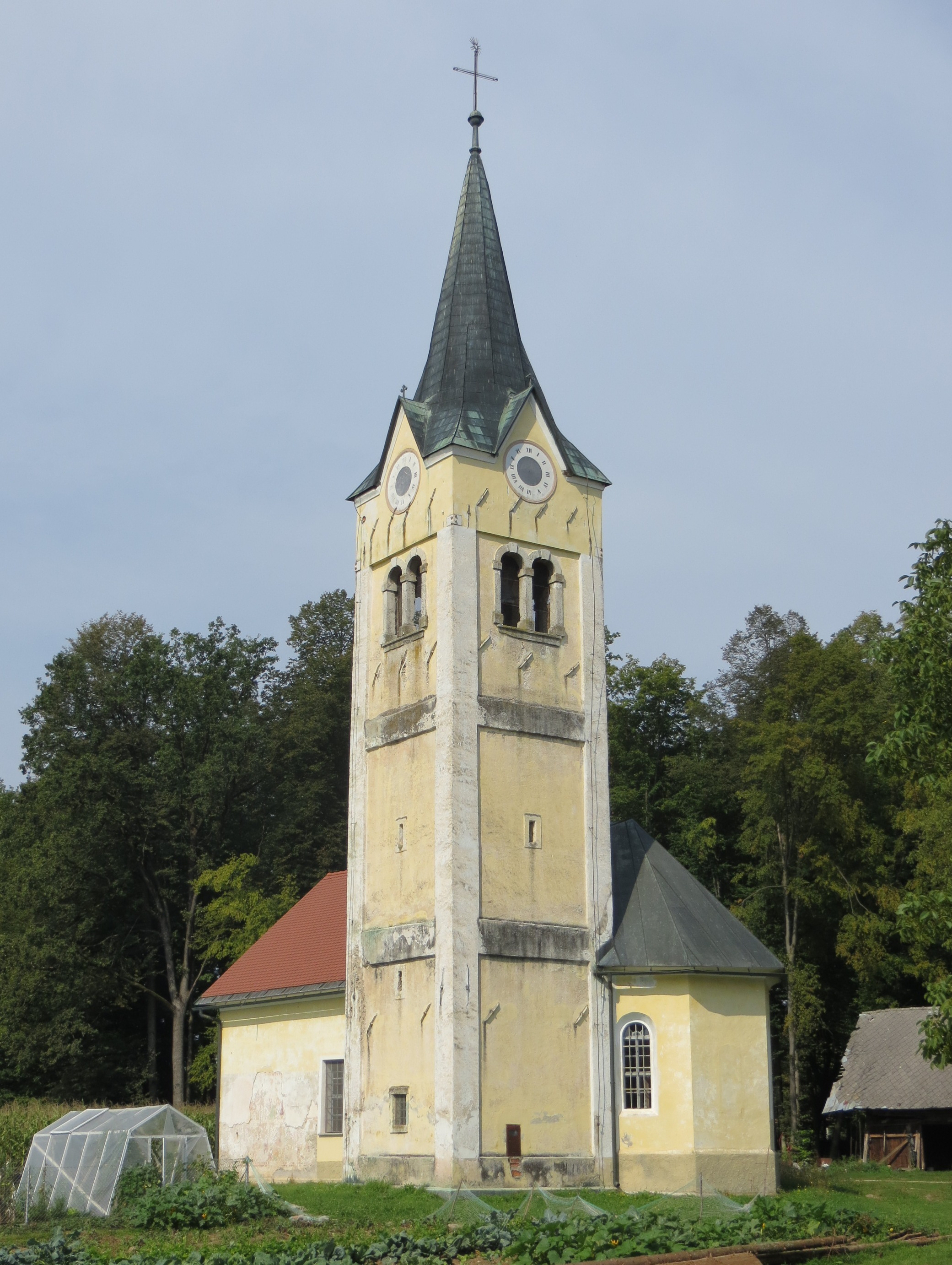
Saint Leonard's Church

The village church is dedicated to Saint Leonard.
