= Milje =

Milje can refer to either:

- Muggia, or Milje in Slovene, a settlement and a commune of Italy
- Milje, Slovenia, a village in the Šenčur municipality in Slovenia
- Milje, Trnovo, a village in Bosnia and Herzegovina
