= Visoko (disambiguation) =

Visoko is a city and municipality in Bosnia and Herzegovina.

Visoko may also refer to:

- Visoko, Varaždin County, a village and municipality in Croatia
- Visoko, Šenčur, a village in the municipality of Šenčur, Slovenia
- Visoko, Ig, a village in the municipality of Ig, Slovenia
- Visoko pri Poljanah, a settlement in the municipality of Škofja Loka, Slovenia
- "Visoko", song by Bulgarian band FSB
