= Prase =

Prase may refer to:

- Praše, a village in Slovenia
- Chrysoprase, a gemstone variety of chalcedony
- Baka Prase (born 1996), Serbian YouTuber
