= Luže =

Luže may refer to places:

- Luže (Chrudim District), a town in the Czech Republic
- Luže, Šenčur, a settlement in Slovenia
