= Lake Trboje =

- Lake Mavčiče, Lake Kranj
- Trbojsko jezero (Slovene); Mavčiško jezero (Slovene); Kranjsko jezero (Slovene)
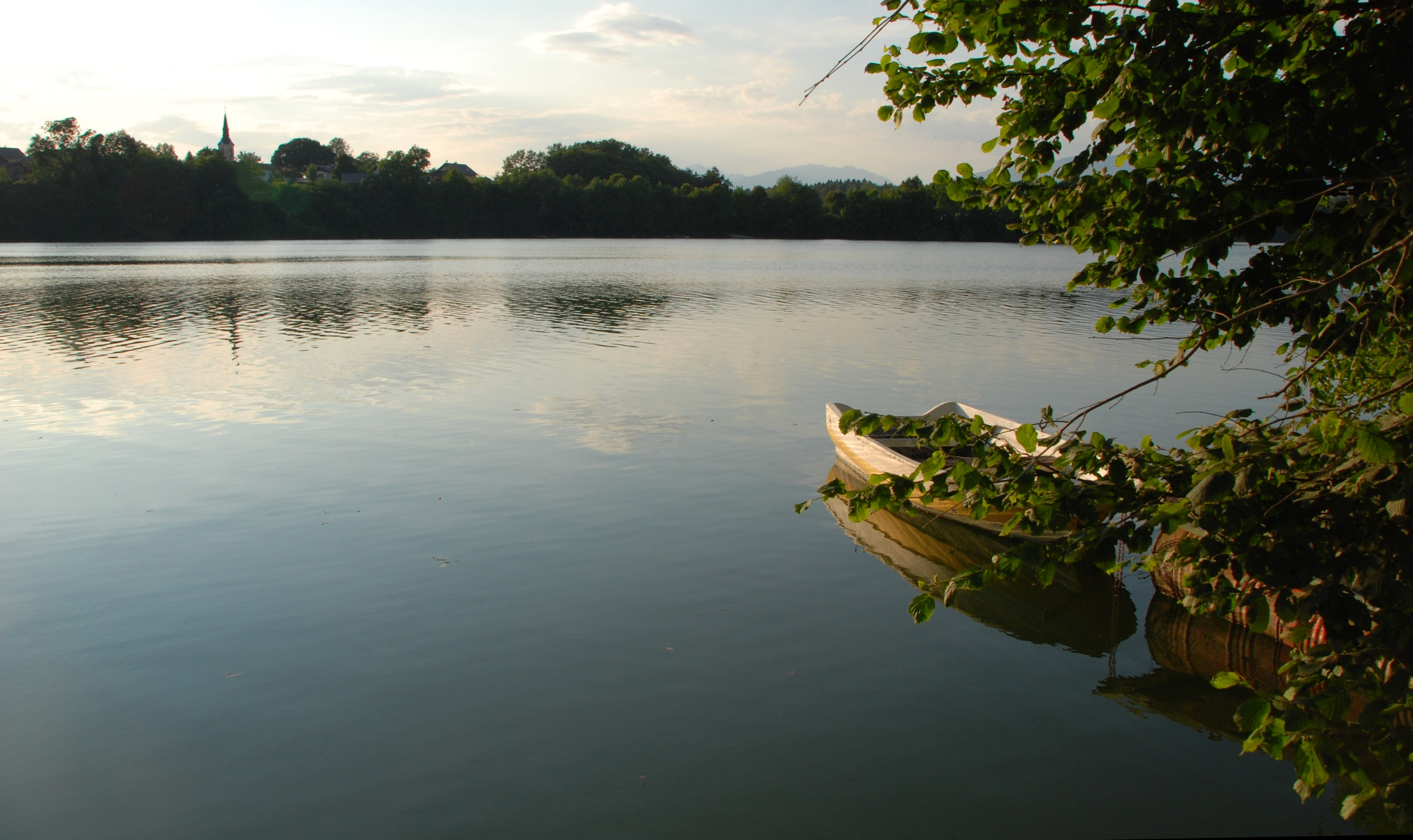
- View of Lake Trboje from Trboje

- Location within Slovenia
- Location: Slovenia
- Coordinates: 46°11′41.3″N 14°24′16.02″E
- Type: reservoir
- Surface area: 1 square kilometre (0.39 sq mi)
- Max. depth: 17 metres (56 ft)

Lake Trboje (Slovene: Trbojsko jezero), also named Lake Mavčiče (Mavčiško jezero) and Lake Kranj (Kranjsko jezero), is an artificial lake west of the village of Trboje in the Municipality of Šenčur, northwestern Slovenia. It was created in 1986 as a reservoir for the Mavčiče Hydroelectric Plant by damming the Sava River.

The lake, which belongs to the Municipalities of Šenčur, Kranj, and Medvode, covers an area of 1 square kilometre (0.39 sq mi) and is up to 17 metres (56 ft) deep. As the lake submerged part of the Zarica Gorge of the Sava, it is surrounded by steep banks, with conglomerate cliffs in the northern part. A number of villages lie at the lake: from the south towards the north, they are Moše, Trboje and Žerjavka on the east side, and Mavčiče, Praše, and Jama on the west side.

The lake is renowned by its fauna, which includes numerous fish (particularly carp) and about 140 species of birds. It is a rare and the biggest nesting place of the common merganser in Slovenia. The flora features a number of alpine species, among them the edelweiss. It is a popular place for fishing and boating.
