= Srednja Vas pri Šenčurju =

Srednja Vas pri Šenčurju Srednja Vas (until 1955)
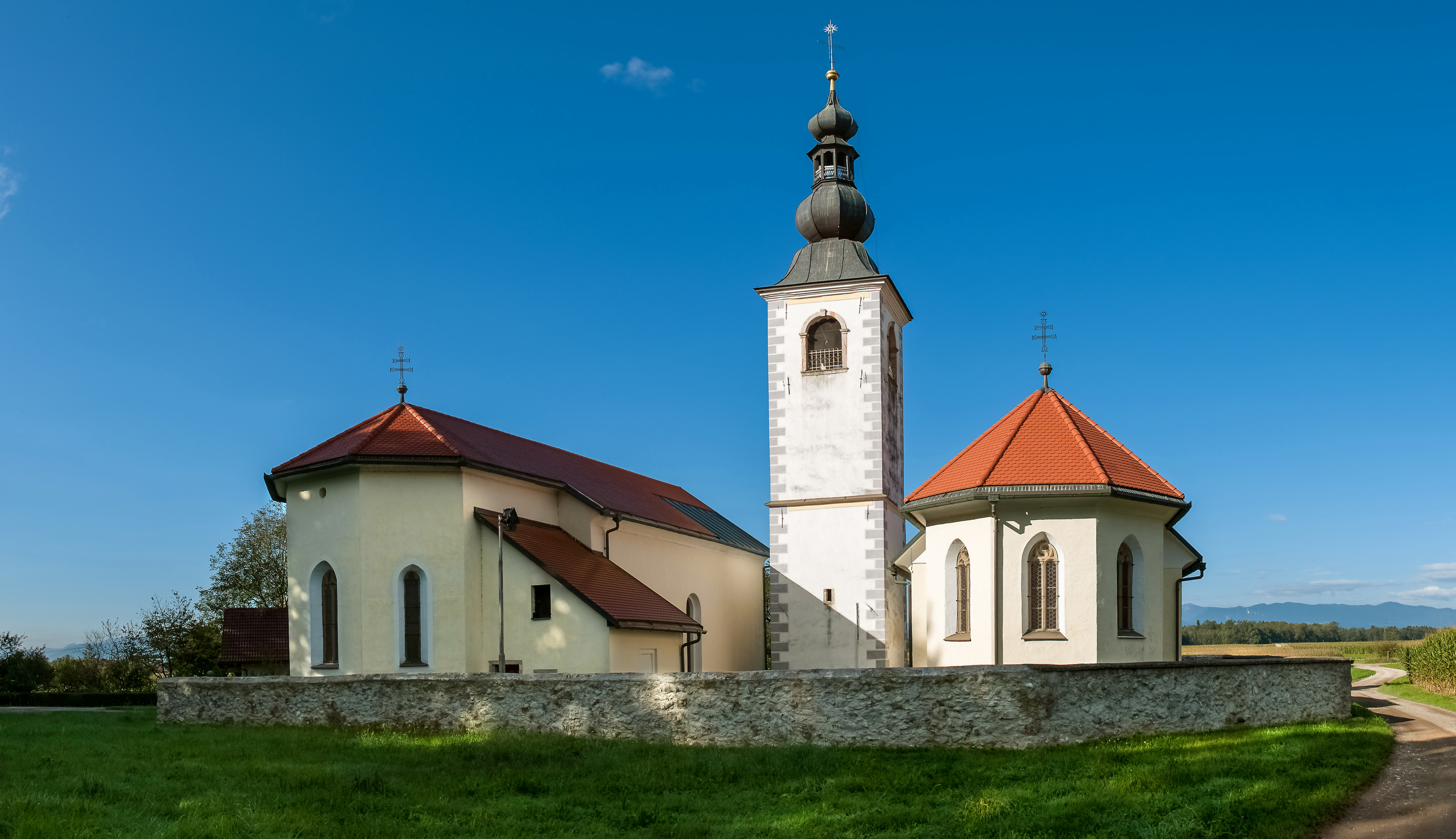
- Saint Radegund and Saint Catherine

- Location in Slovenia
- Coordinates: 46°15′31.53″N 14°25′35.4″E
- Country: Slovenia
- Traditional Region: Upper Carniola
- Statistical region: Upper Carniola
- Municipality: Šenčur
- Elevation: 420.5 m (1,380 ft)

Population (2002)
  - Total: 487

Srednja Vas pri Šenčurju (pronounced [ˈsɾeːdnja ˈʋaːs pɾi ʃɛnˈtʃuːɾju]; Slovene: Srednja vas pri Šenčurju, German: Mitterdorf) is a village in the Municipality of Šenčur in the Upper Carniola region of Slovenia.

== Name ==
The name of the settlement was changed from Srednja vas to Srednja vas pri Šenčurju in 1955. In the past the German name was Mitterdorf.

== Churches ==
Twin churches with a single shared spire in the village are dedicated to Saint Radegund and Saint Catherine. Saint Radegunde's is the older of the two with a Romanesque nave and Gothic frescos from around 1440. The sanctuary has Gothic rib vaulting from the second half of the 15th century and the nave was vaulted in 1853. Saint Catherine's is younger with a choir dated 1535. Eight Stations of the Cross are displayed in the nave and a wooden polychrome pulpit from the 17th century can be seen on the south wall. The spire was probably built in the early 16th century at about the time the second church was erected.

== Gallery ==
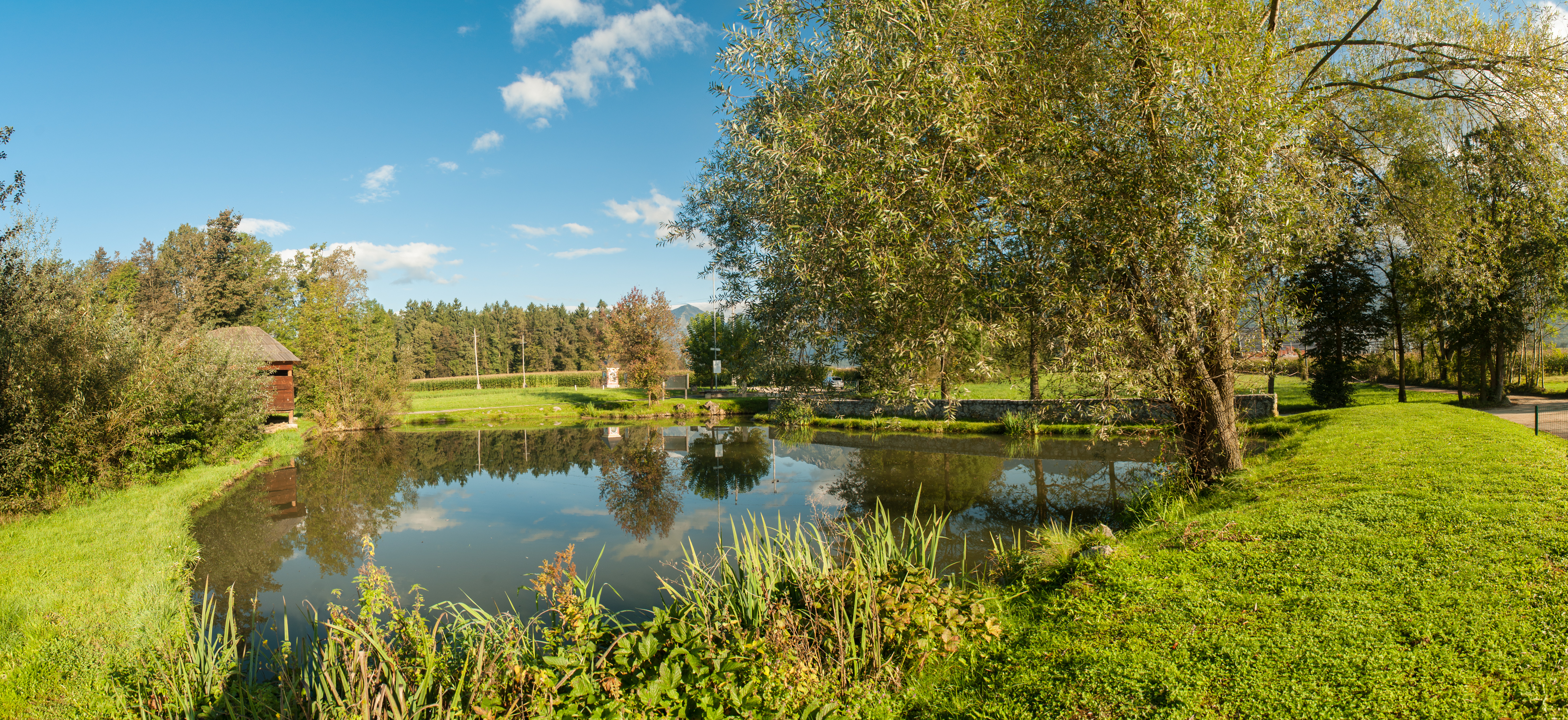
Pond in Srednja Vas

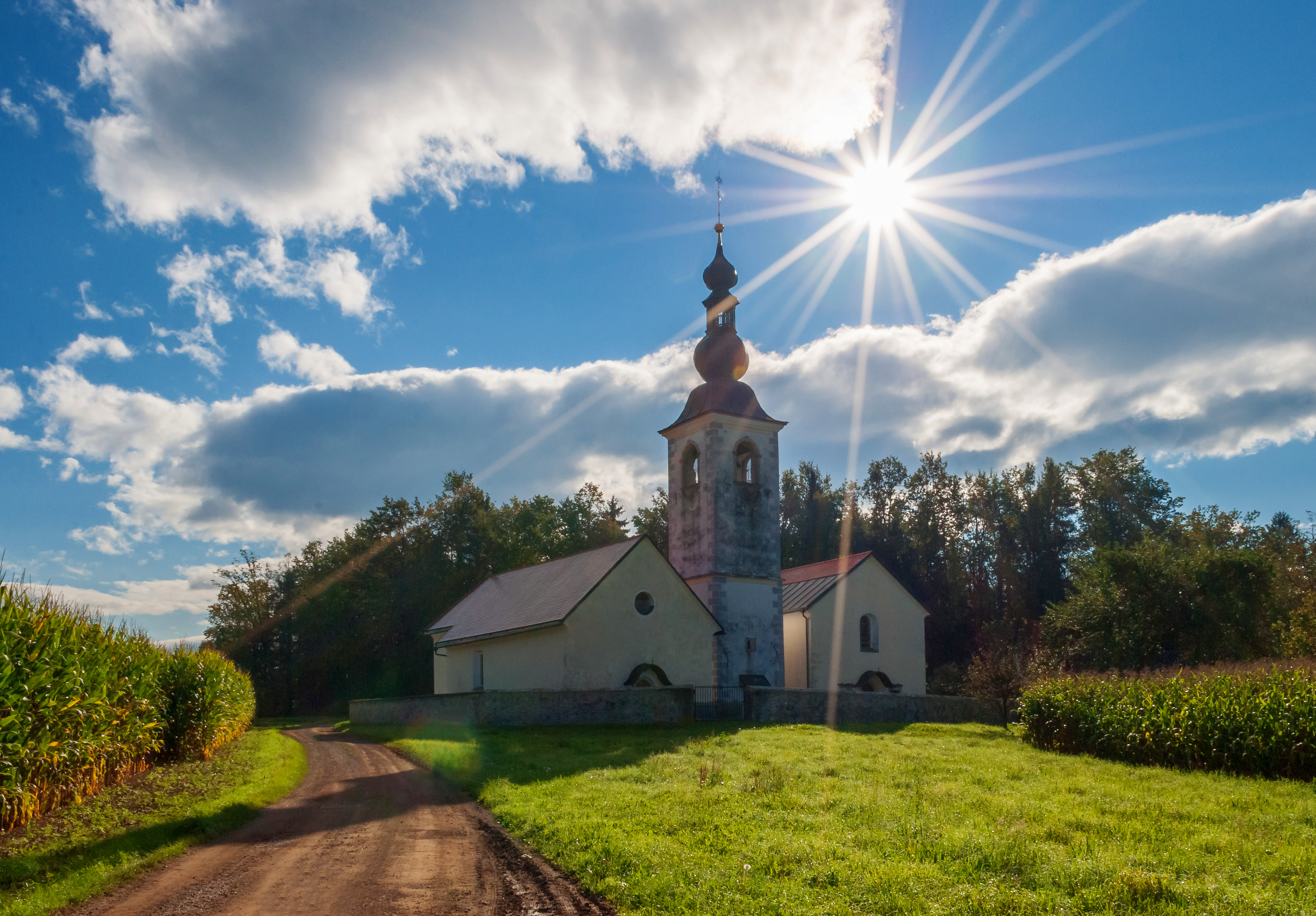
Saint Radegund and Saint Catherine
