= Prebačevo =

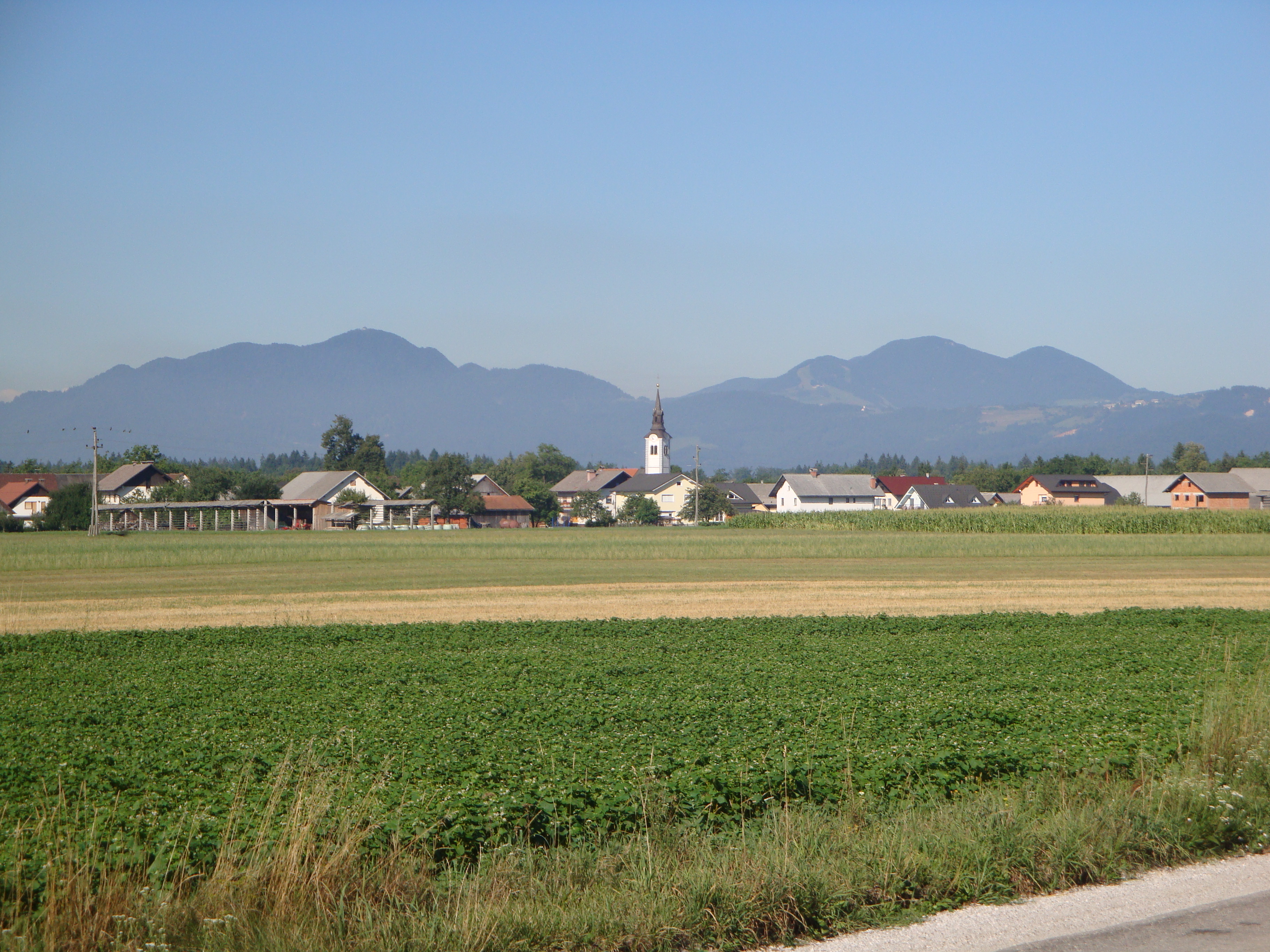

- Location in Slovenia
- Coordinates: 46°12′52.25″N 14°23′33.55″E
- Country: Slovenia
- Traditional Region: Upper Carniola
- Statistical region: Upper Carniola
- Municipality: Šenčur
- Elevation: 367.6 m (1,206 ft)

Population (2002)
  - Total: 420

Prebačevo (pronounced [pɾɛˈbaːtʃɛʋɔ]) is a village in the Municipality of Šenčur in the Upper Carniola region of Slovenia.

== Name ==
Prebačevo was attested in written sources in 1343 as Pribêtsh (and as Prewacz in 1381, Ober Pribbetsch and Priwetsch in 1436, and Prewatsch in 1458). In the local dialect, the village is known as Pərbačou̯. The medieval attestations and the local pronunciation indicate that the name may be derived from *Pribačevo (selo) 'Pribač's (village)', with the personal name *Pribač derived from Slavic *Pribyslavъ.

== Church ==
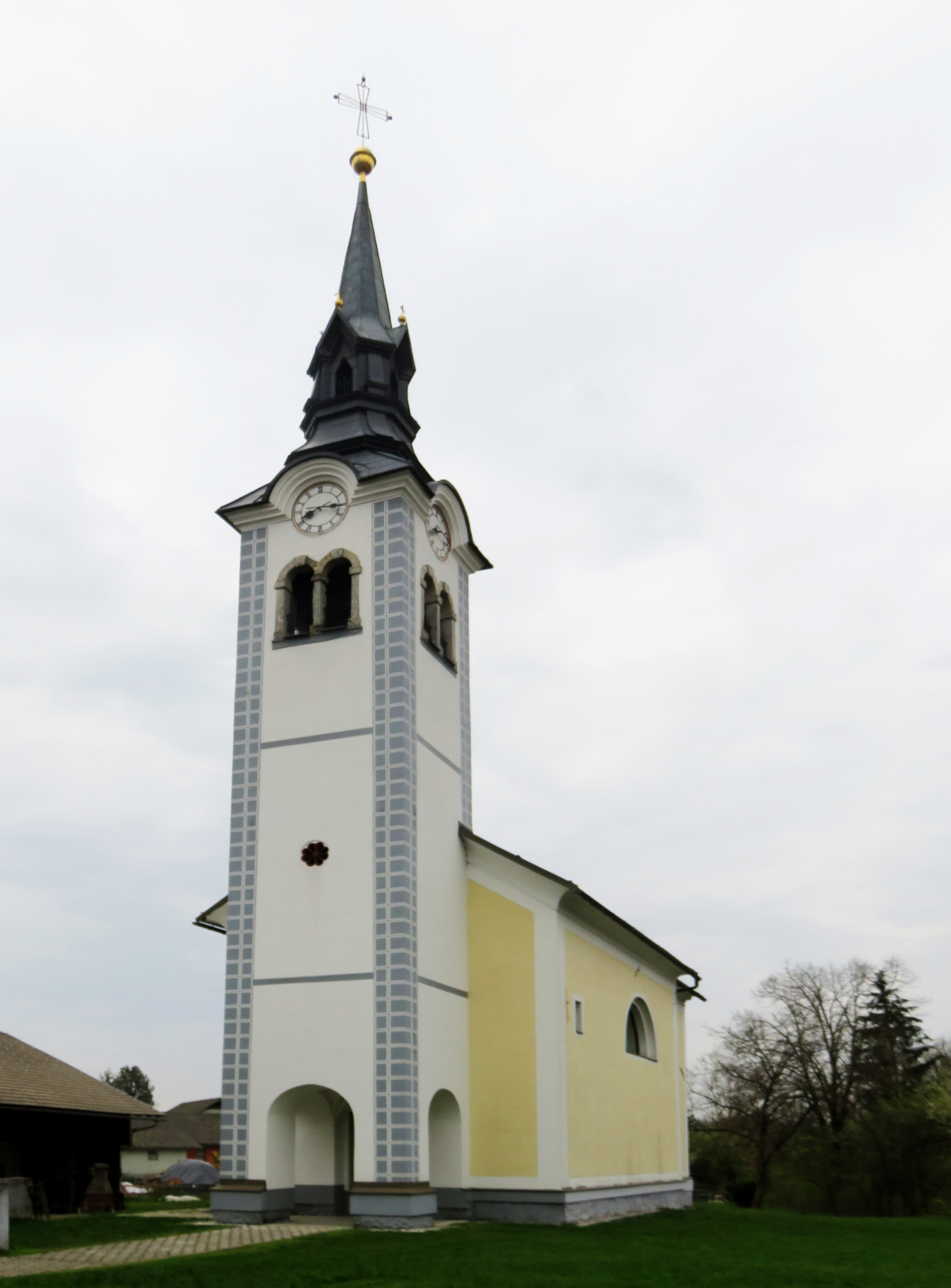
Exaltation of the Holy Cross Church

The local church, a chapel-of-ease of the Parish of Šenčur, is dedicated to the Exaltation of the Holy Cross. The current building dates to 1855, but it was built on the site of an earlier church.
