= Voglje, Šenčur =

Voglje
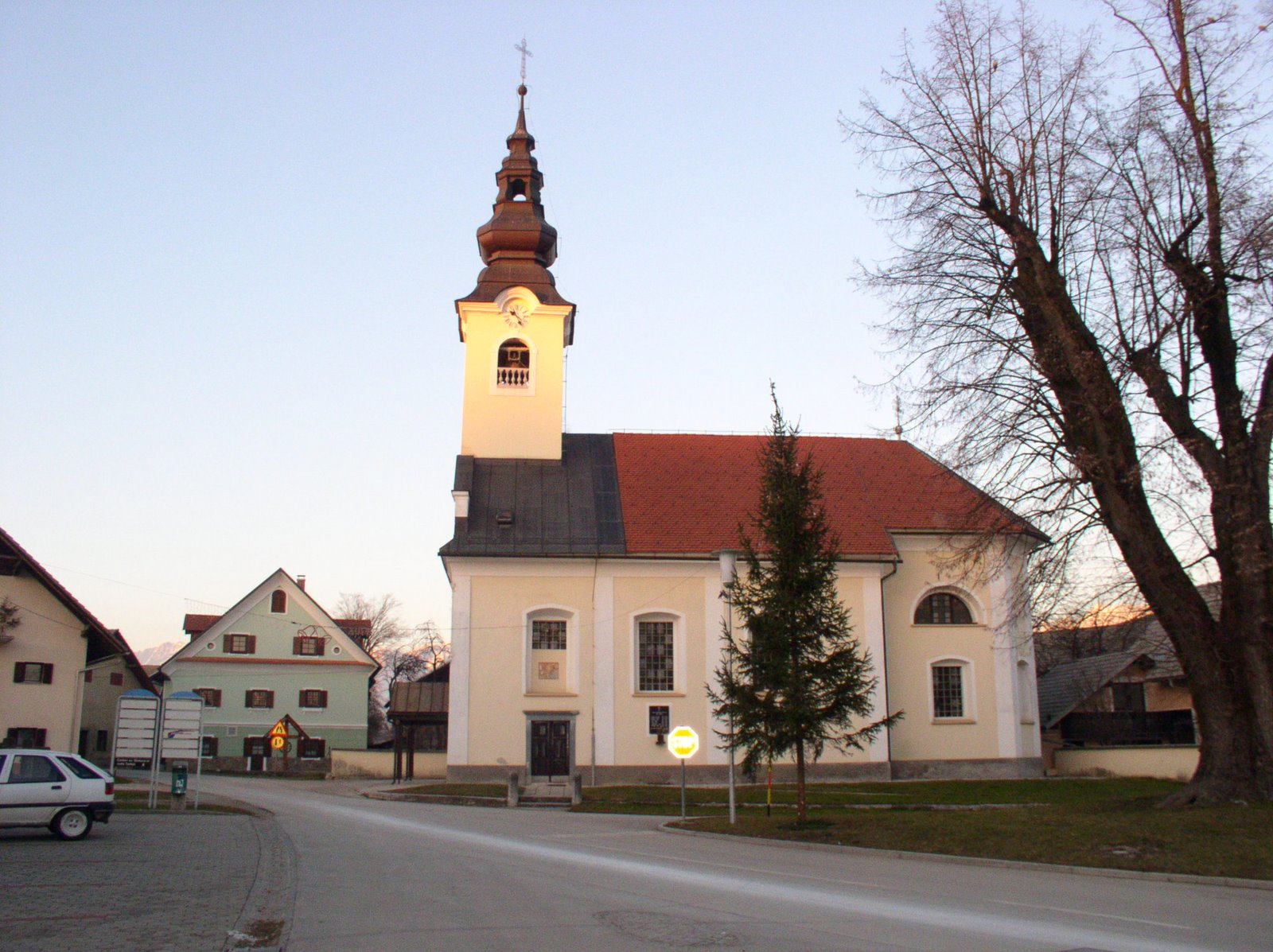

- Location in Slovenia
- Coordinates: 46°12′54.66″N 14°26′7.5″E
- Country: Slovenia
- Traditional Region: Upper Carniola
- Statistical region: Upper Carniola
- Municipality: Šenčur
- Elevation: 371.2 m (1,218 ft)

Population (2002)
  - Total: 639

Voglje (pronounced [ˈʋoːɡljɛ]; German: Winklern) is a village in the Municipality of Šenčur in the Upper Carniola region of Slovenia.

== Name ==
Voglje was attested in written sources in 1247 as in villa Winkeler (and as Winchleren in 1313 and Winklern in 1408). The Slovene name developed from the plural accusative demonym *Ǫgъľane, derived from the common noun *ǫgъlъ (> Sln. vogel) 'corner; upper part of a mountain chain; place where two ridges diverge', and therefore originally refers to the residents of such a location.

== Church ==
The local church is dedicated to Saint Simon and Saint Jude and was built in 1750 on the site of an earlier church.
