= Olševek =

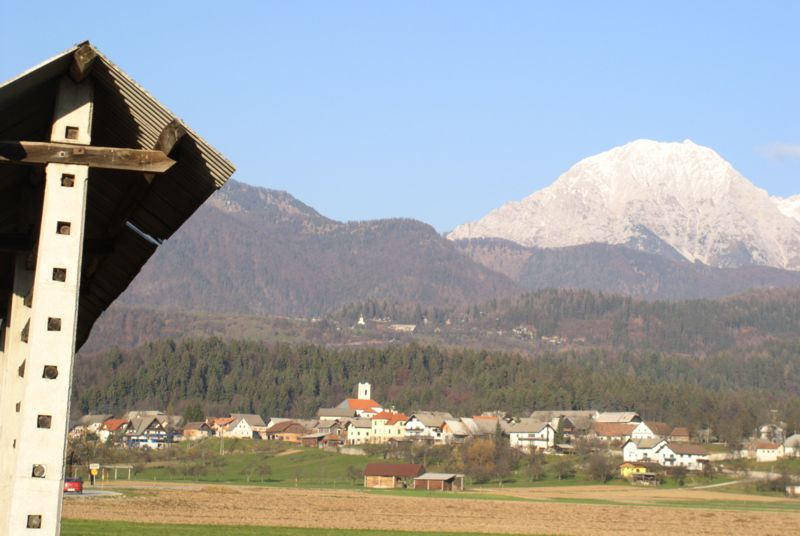

- Location in Slovenia
- Coordinates: 46°16′54.58″N 14°26′15.13″E
- Country: Slovenia
- Traditional Region: Upper Carniola
- Statistical region: Upper Carniola
- Municipality: Šenčur
- Elevation: 469.6 m (1,541 ft)

Population (2002)
  - Total: 313

Olševek (pronounced [ɔu̯ˈʃeːʋək]; in older sources also Viševek, German: Olscheuk) is a village in the Municipality of Šenčur in the Upper Carniola region of Slovenia.

The local church is dedicated to Saint Michael.
