= Žerjavka =

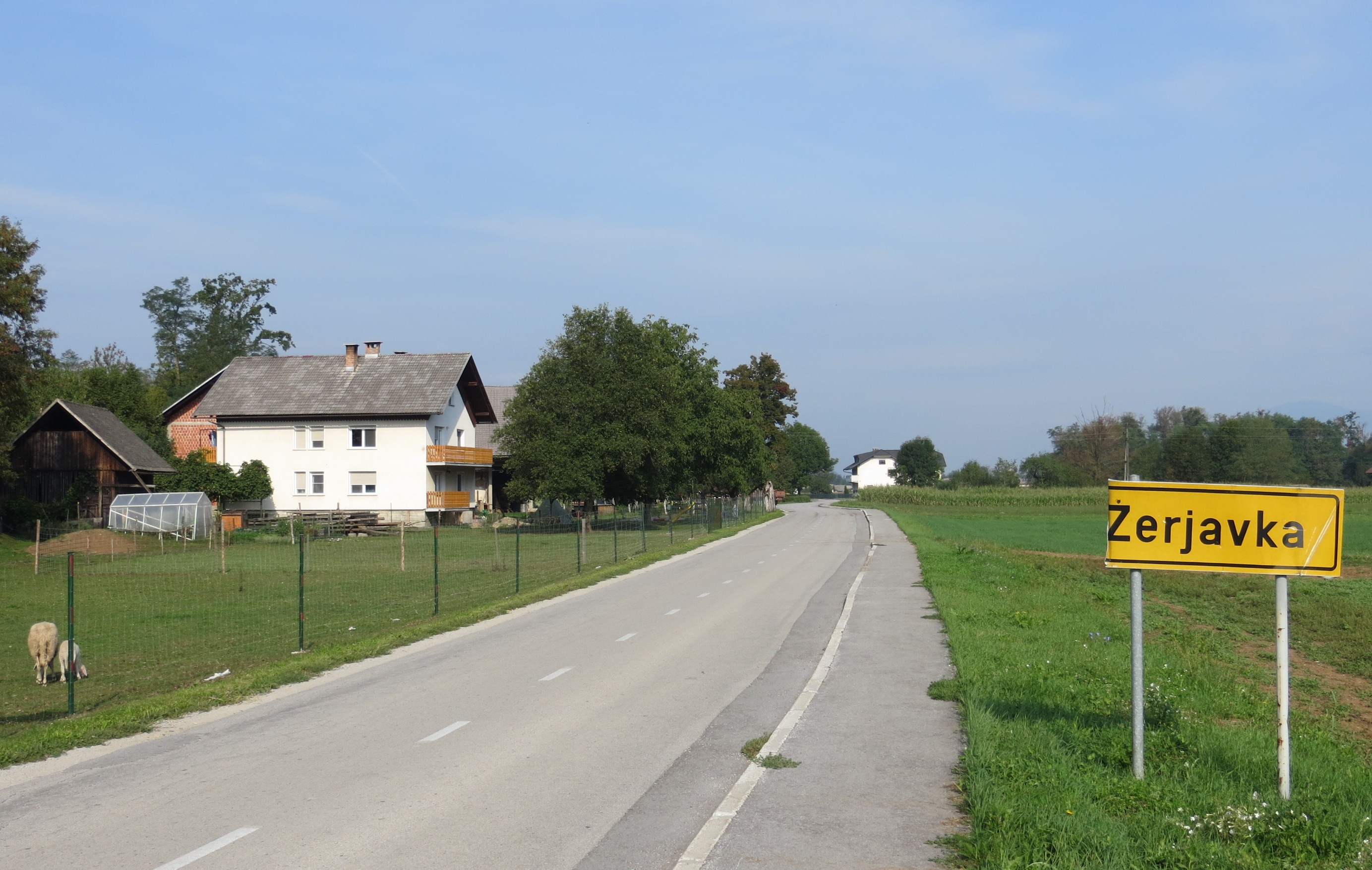

- Location in Slovenia
- Coordinates: 46°12′10.06″N 14°24′11.33″E
- Country: Slovenia
- Traditional Region: Upper Carniola
- Statistical region: Upper Carniola
- Municipality: Šenčur
- Elevation: 364.9 m (1,197 ft)

Population (2002)
  - Total: 38

Žerjavka (pronounced [ʒɛˈɾjaːu̯ka]) is a small settlement in the Municipality of Šenčur in the Upper Carniola region of Slovenia. It lies north of Lake Trboje, the reservoir of the Mavčiče Hydroelectric Plant on the Sava River.

== Name ==
Žerjavka was attested in 1324 as Chranchsfur (and as Chranichsfurt in 1420, and Seryawicz and Saryaw in 1436). The name is based on the Slovene common noun žerjav 'crane', referring to the local fauna, and is additionally confirmed by the Middle High German attestations, which contain the root kranech 'crane'.
