= Hotemaže =

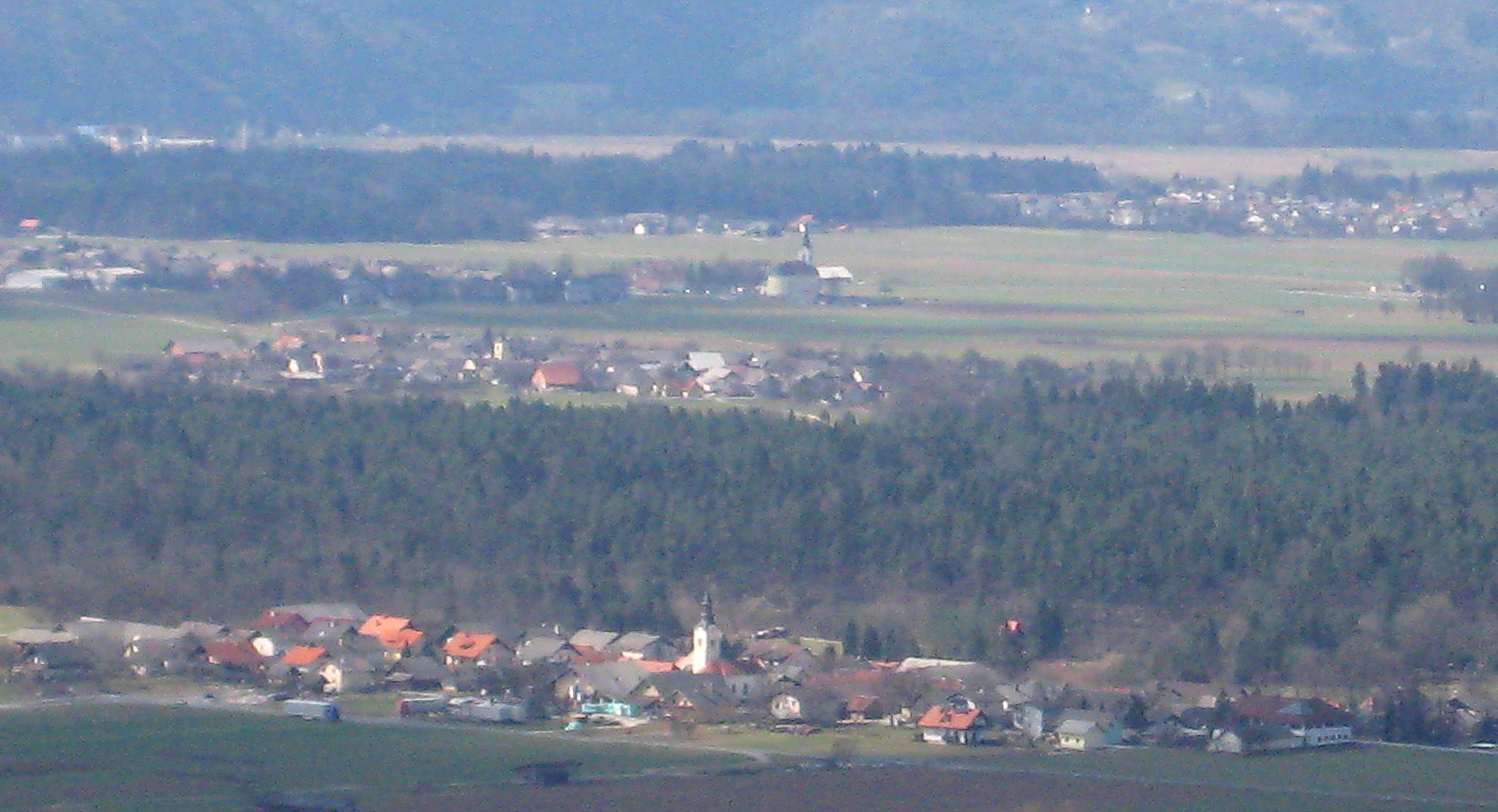

- Location in Slovenia
- Coordinates: 46°17′5.76″N 14°25′17.28″E
- Country: Slovenia
- Traditional Region: Upper Carniola
- Statistical region: Upper Carniola
- Municipality: Šenčur
- Elevation: 440 m (1,440 ft)

Population (2002)
  - Total: 426

Hotemaže (pronounced [xɔˈteːmaʒɛ]; German: Hotemasch) is a village in the Municipality of Šenčur in the Upper Carniola region of Slovenia.

The church in the village is dedicated to Saint Ulrich. It is a single-aisle church with a Gothic sanctuary built around 1470. Its highly ornamental altar dates to 1701.

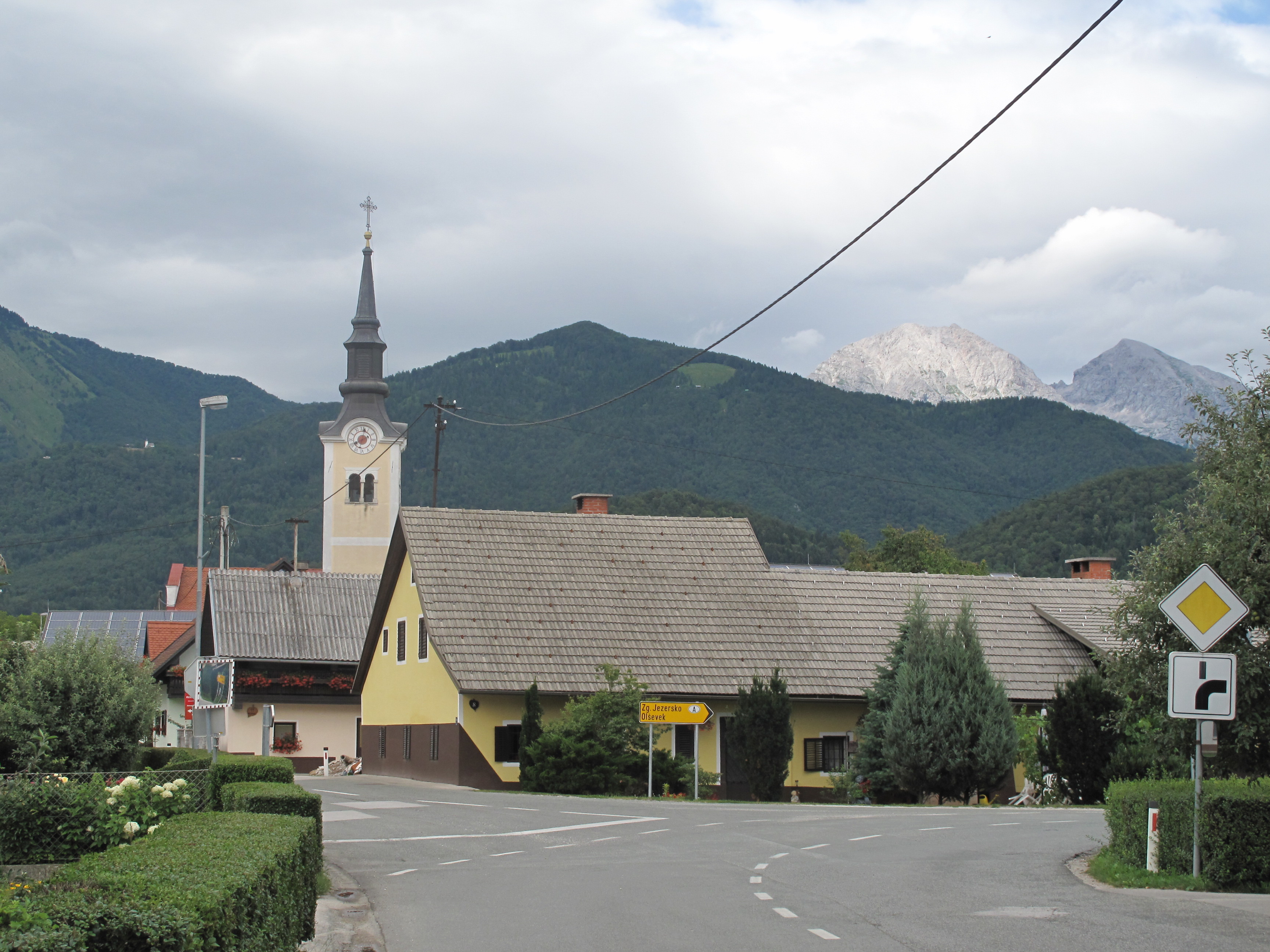
Hotemaže, church tower in the street
