= Moše =

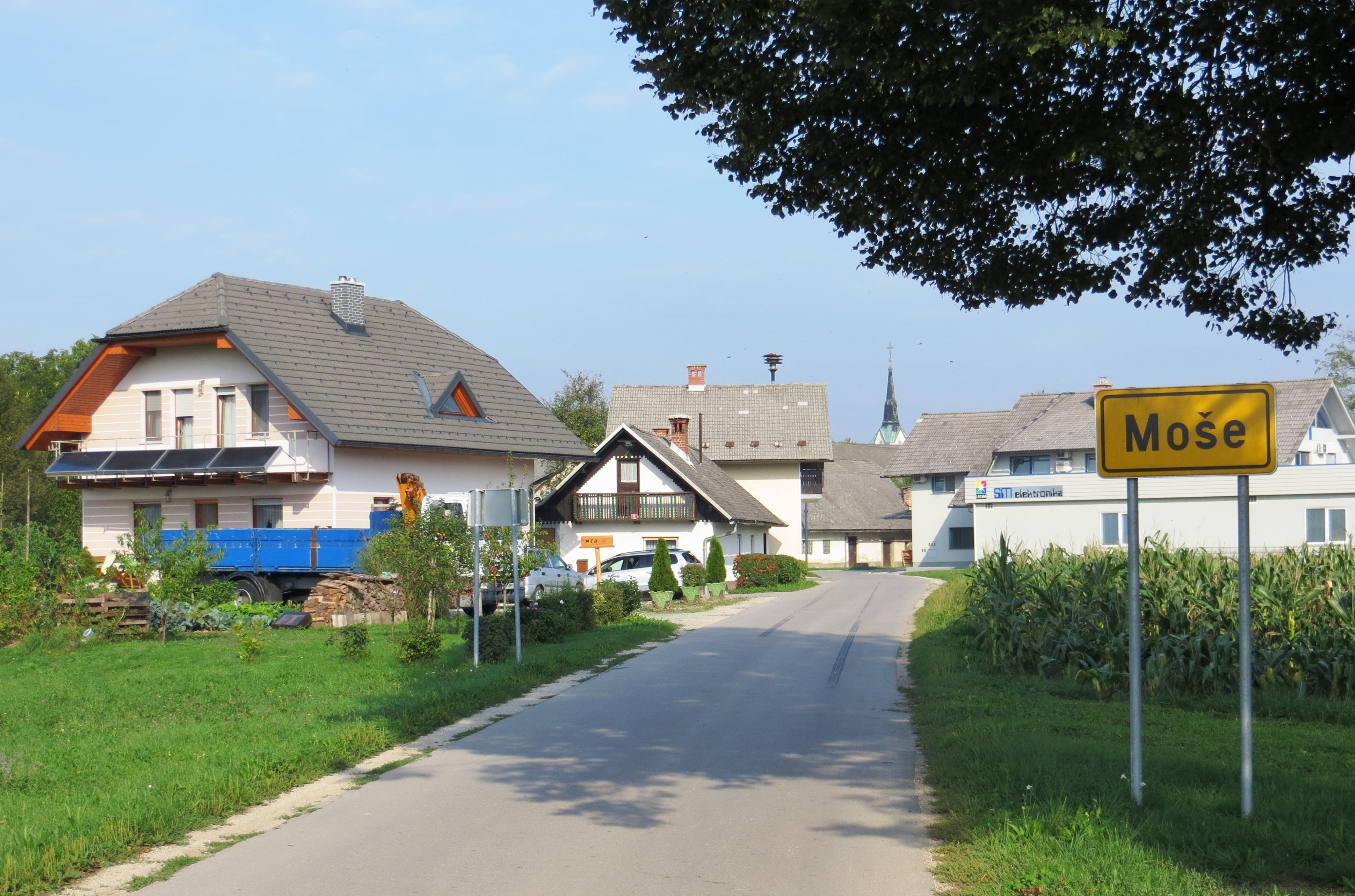

- Location in Slovenia
- Coordinates: 46°11′1.18″N 14°24′41.45″E
- Country: Slovenia
- Traditional region: Upper Carniola
- Statistical region: Central Slovenia
- Municipality: Medvode

Area
  - Total: 1.4 km^{2} (0.54 sq mi)
- Elevation: 357 m (1,171 ft)

Population (2002)
  - Total: 219

Moše (pronounced [ˈmoːʃɛ]; German: Mosche) is a village on the left bank of the Sava River in the Municipality of Medvode in the Upper Carniola region of Slovenia. It lies southeast of Lake Trboje, the reservoir of the Mavčiče Hydroelectric Plant on the Sava River.

== Name ==
Moše was attested in written sources in 1334 as Pruk (and as Prukk in 1355, Mossah in 1496, and Mosnach vnder Flednikch in 1478). The Slovene name is derived from the plural accusative demonym *Moščane 'those that live by the bridge' from the Slovene common noun most 'bridge' (confirmed by the Bavarian Middle High German name Pruk(k), which corresponds to modern German Brücke 'bridge'). In the past the German name was Mosche.

== Church ==
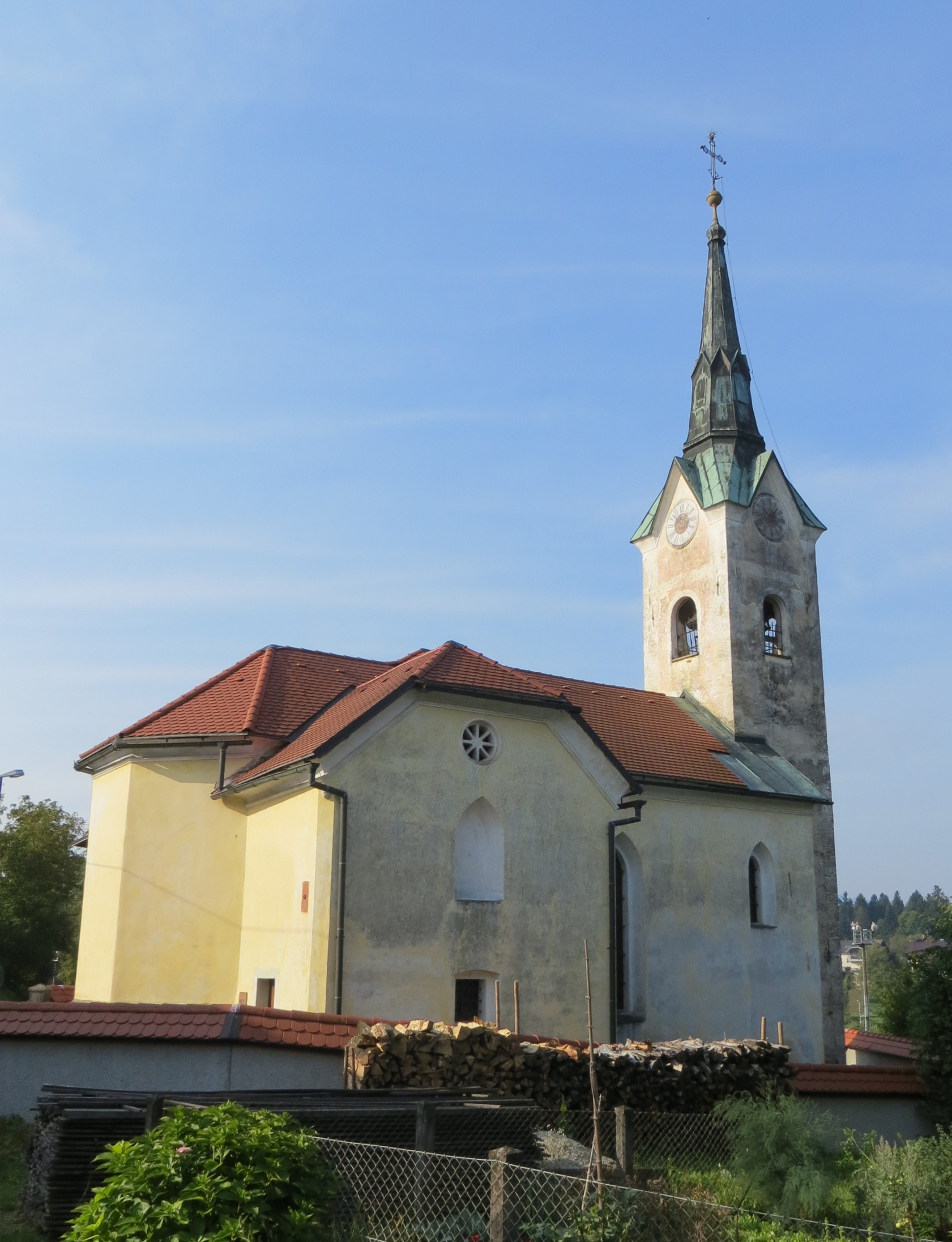
Saint Michael's Church

The church in the settlement is dedicated to Saint Michael and was originally a gothic building. It was first mentioned in documents dating to 1526. It is a single-nave structure with an octagonal chancel walled on five side. The church was renovated in 1859, and again in 1884 in a pseudo-Gothic style. Except for the Way of the Cross, which was painted in 1828, the interior of the church and its furnishings are decorated in the pseudo-Gothic style.
