= Visoko, Šenčur =

Visoko
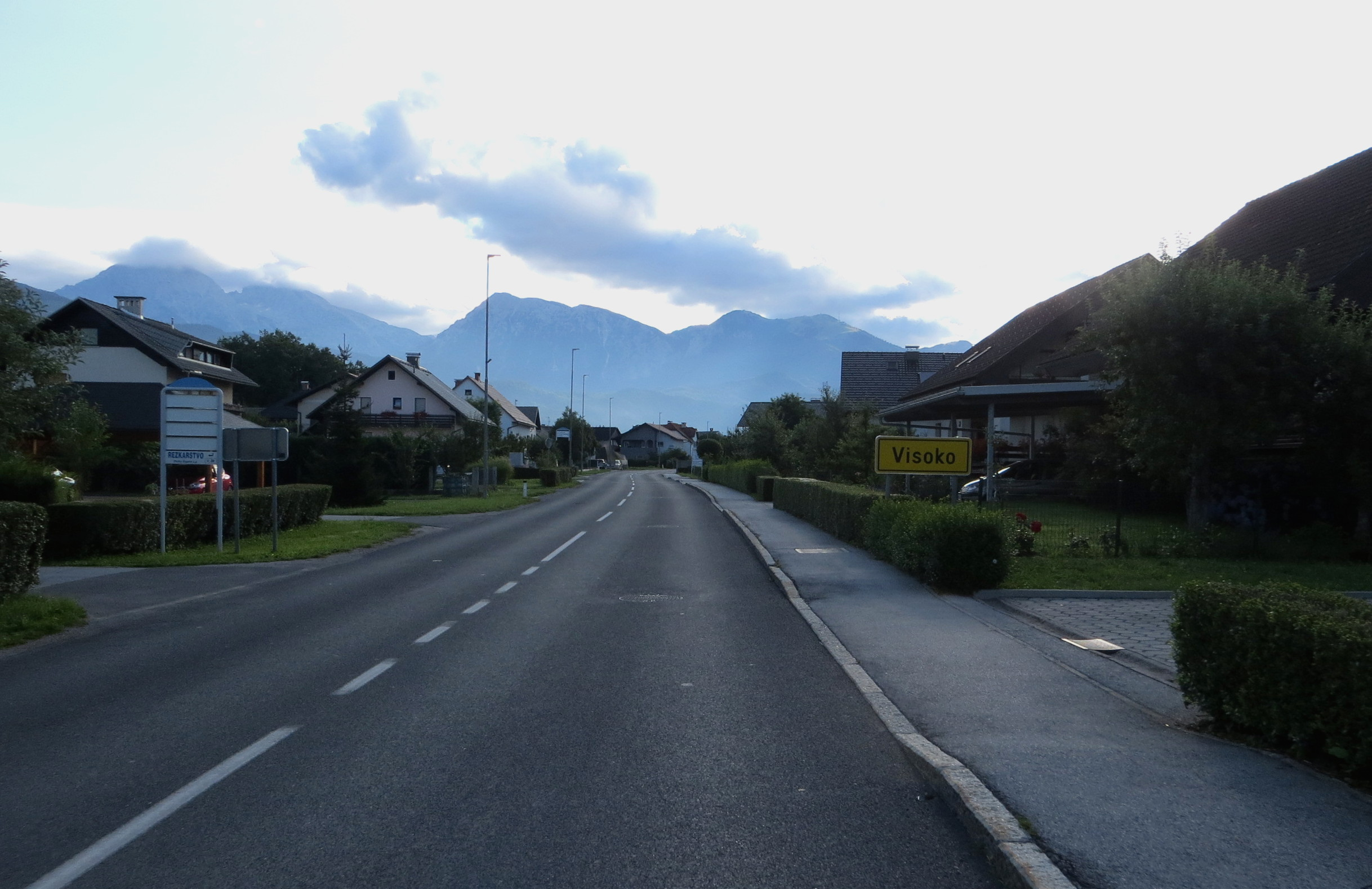

- Location in Slovenia
- Coordinates: 46°16′27.8″N 14°25′4.59″E
- Country: Slovenia
- Traditional Region: Upper Carniola
- Statistical region: Upper Carniola
- Municipality: Šenčur
- Elevation: 430.5 m (1,412 ft)

Population (2002)
  - Total: 802

Visoko (pronounced [ʋiˈsɔːkɔ]; German: Waisach) is a village in the Municipality of Šenčur in the Upper Carniola region of Slovenia.

== Geography ==
Visoko is a ribbon village along the road from Kranj to Zgornje Jezersko, with additional road connections to Cerklje na Gorenjskem, Šenčur, and Suha pri Predosljah. Significant construction of houses along the road to Cerklje na Gorenjskem took place after the Second World War. The Kokra River flows past the village to the west, where it powered two grain mills and a sawmill in the past. The highest elevation in the village is at Hrib Hill (451 meters or 1,480 feet) southeast of the village center.

== Church ==
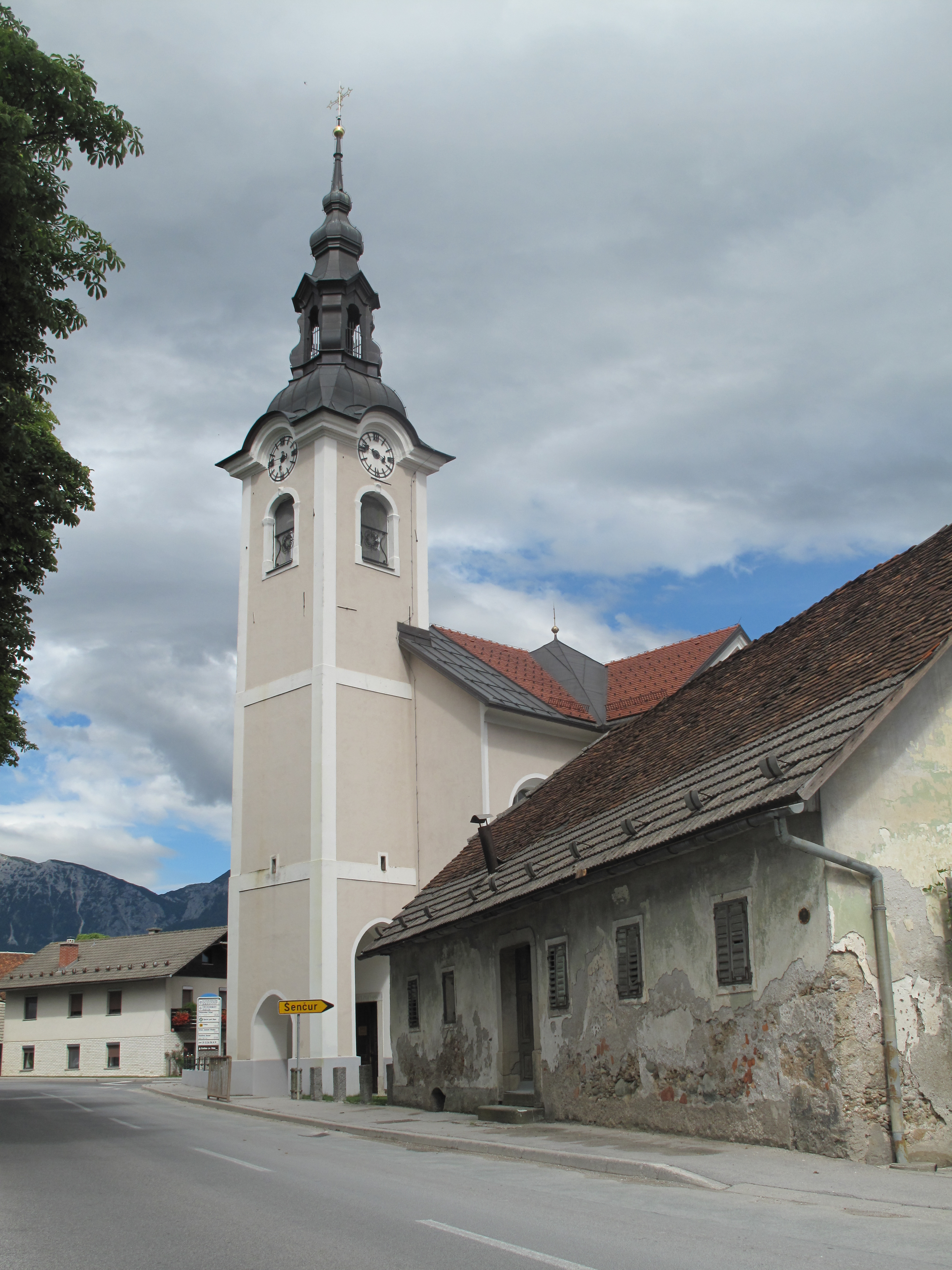
Saint Vitus's Church

The local church is dedicated to Saint Vitus and was built in 1861 on the site of an earlier church.

== Notable people ==
Notable people that were born or lived in Visoko include:

- Peter Bohinjec (1864–1919), writer
