= Voklo =

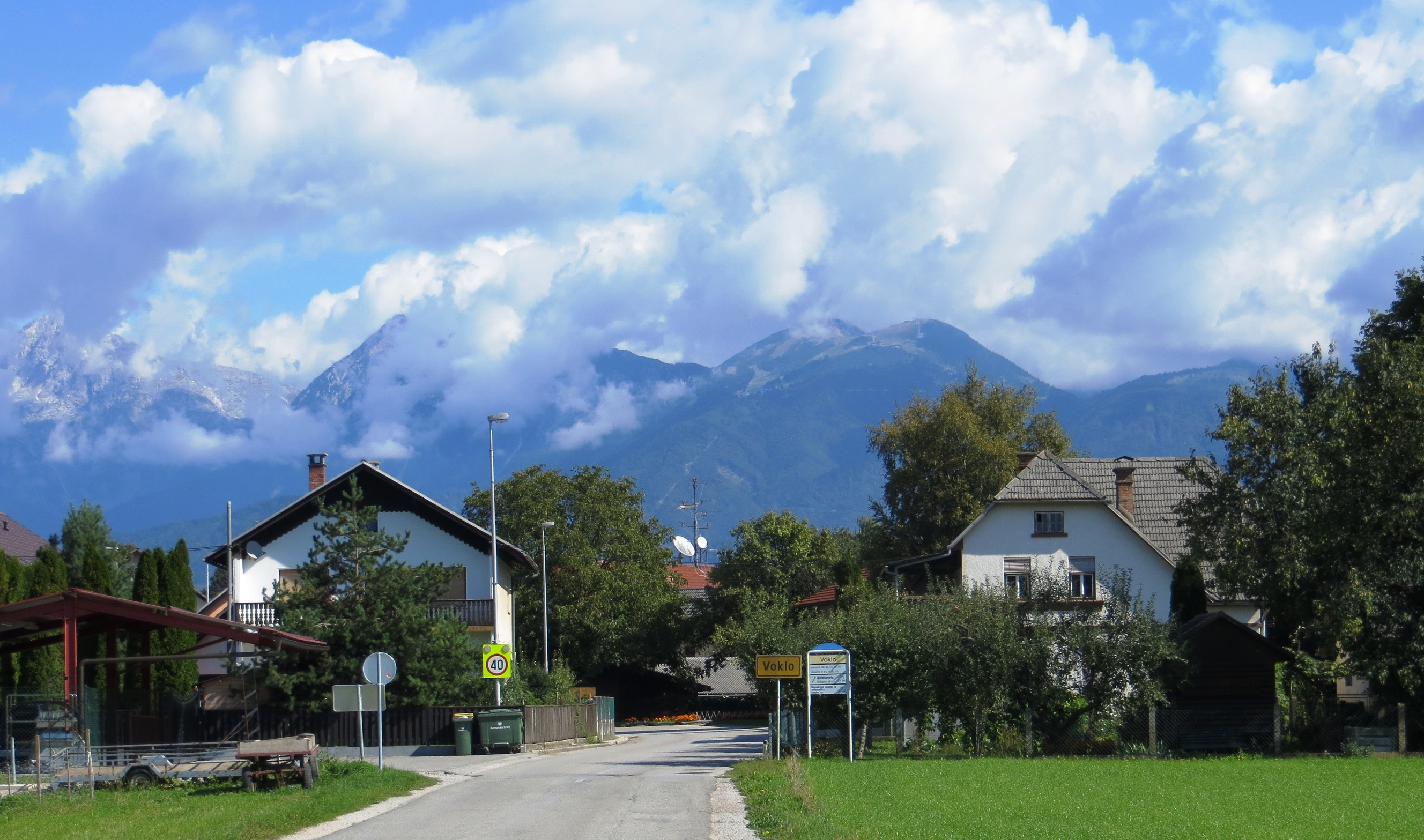

- Location in Slovenia
- Coordinates: 46°12′53.78″N 14°25′21.31″E
- Country: Slovenia
- Traditional Region: Upper Carniola
- Statistical region: Upper Carniola
- Municipality: Šenčur
- Elevation: 372 m (1,220 ft)

Population (2002)
  - Total: 480

Voklo (pronounced [ˈʋoːklɔ]; German: Hülben) is a village in the Municipality of Šenčur in the Upper Carniola region of Slovenia.

== Name ==
Voklo was attested in written sources in 1238 as Hv̊lwe (and as apud Hvlwin in 1238, Hulven in 1270, and Hůlben in 1349). The Slovene name is derived from (v) Lókvo (literally, 'to the watering hole'), thus referring to a local geographical feature. Phonologically, it is the result of a dialect development in which l- > w- (lokev > wọ́ku, genitive wọ́kwe) followed by dissimilation of the genitive (wọ́kwe > wọ́kle), creation of the new feminine nominative wọ́kla, and subsequent reanalysis of the accusative wọ́klo as a neuter nominative. In the local dialect, the name of the village is Wọ́ku (genitive Wọ́kləga). In the past the German name was Hülben.

== Church ==
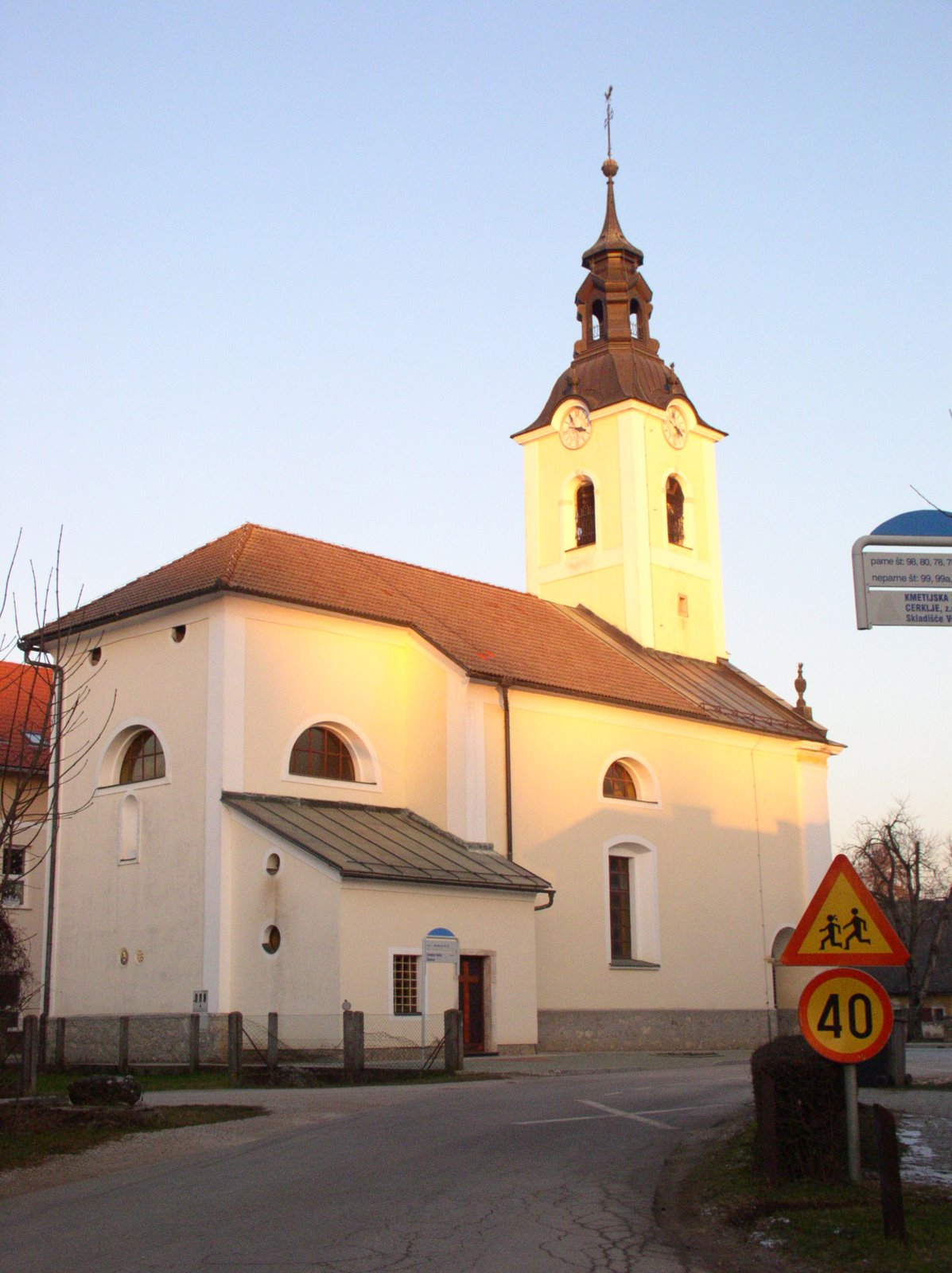
Saint Bartholomew's Church

The local church is dedicated to Saint Bartholomew and was built in 1862. In addition to the altar dedicated to Saint Bartholomew, which was created by Štefan Šubic (1820–1884) and his son Valentin (1859–1927), the church also has a painting of the saint by Štefan Šubic's sons Janez (1850–1889) and Jurij (1855–1890).
