= Praše =

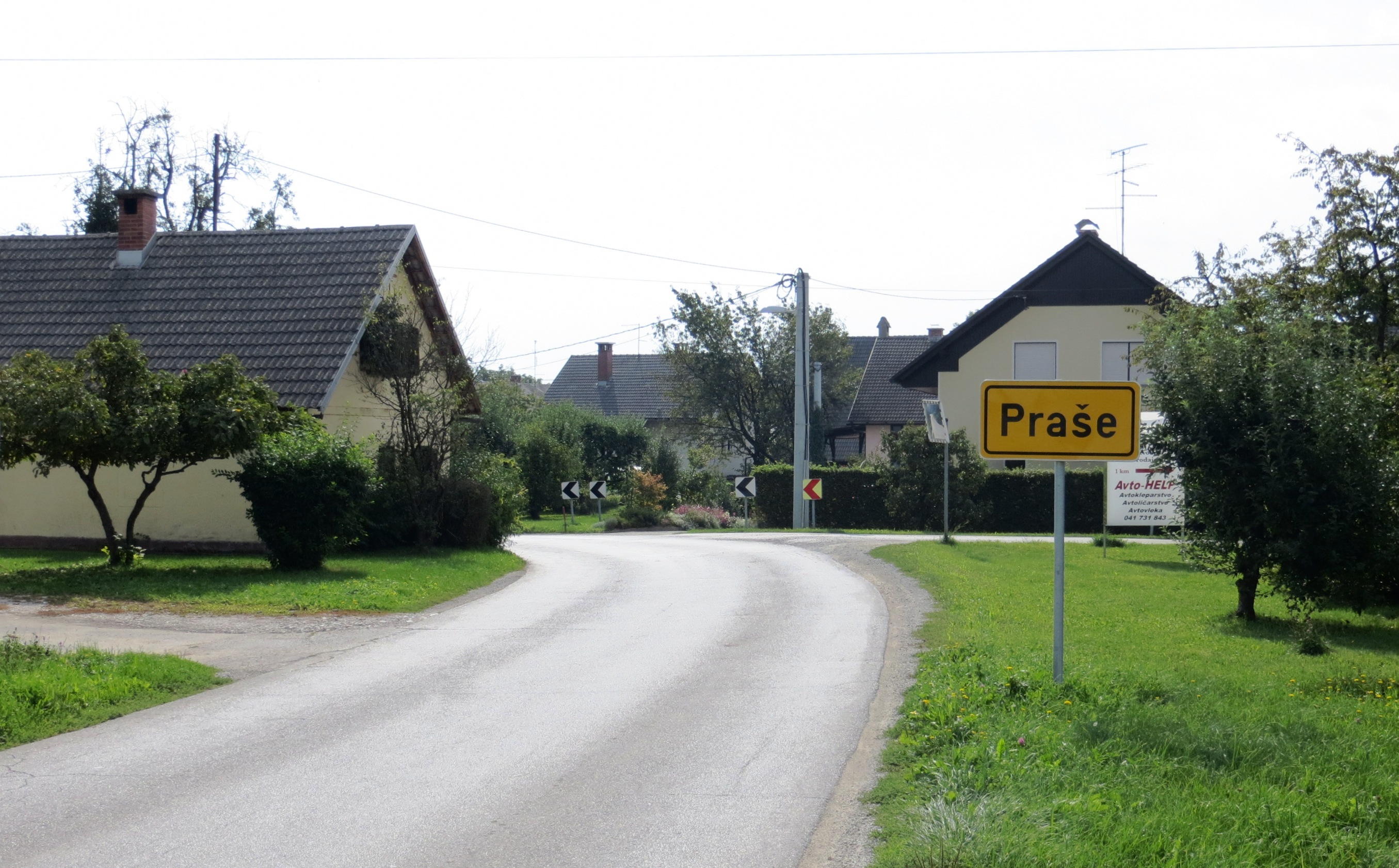

- Location in Slovenia
- Coordinates: 46°11′36.62″N 14°24′5.16″E
- Country: Slovenia
- Traditional region: Upper Carniola
- Statistical region: Upper Carniola
- Municipality: Kranj

Area
  - Total: 0.91 km^{2} (0.35 sq mi)
- Elevation: 362.1 m (1,188 ft)

Population (2002)
  - Total: 224

Praše (pronounced [ˈpɾaːʃɛ]; German: Prasche) is a village on the right bank of the Sava River in the Municipality of Kranj in the Upper Carniola region of Slovenia. It lies west of Lake Trboje, the reservoir of the Mavčiče Hydroelectric Plant on the Sava River.

== Name ==
Praše was attested in historical sources as Praschach in 1291, Prasschach in 1318, Pratschach in 1383, and Prasach in 1500, all reflecting the locative inflection of the village's feminine plural name.

== Church ==
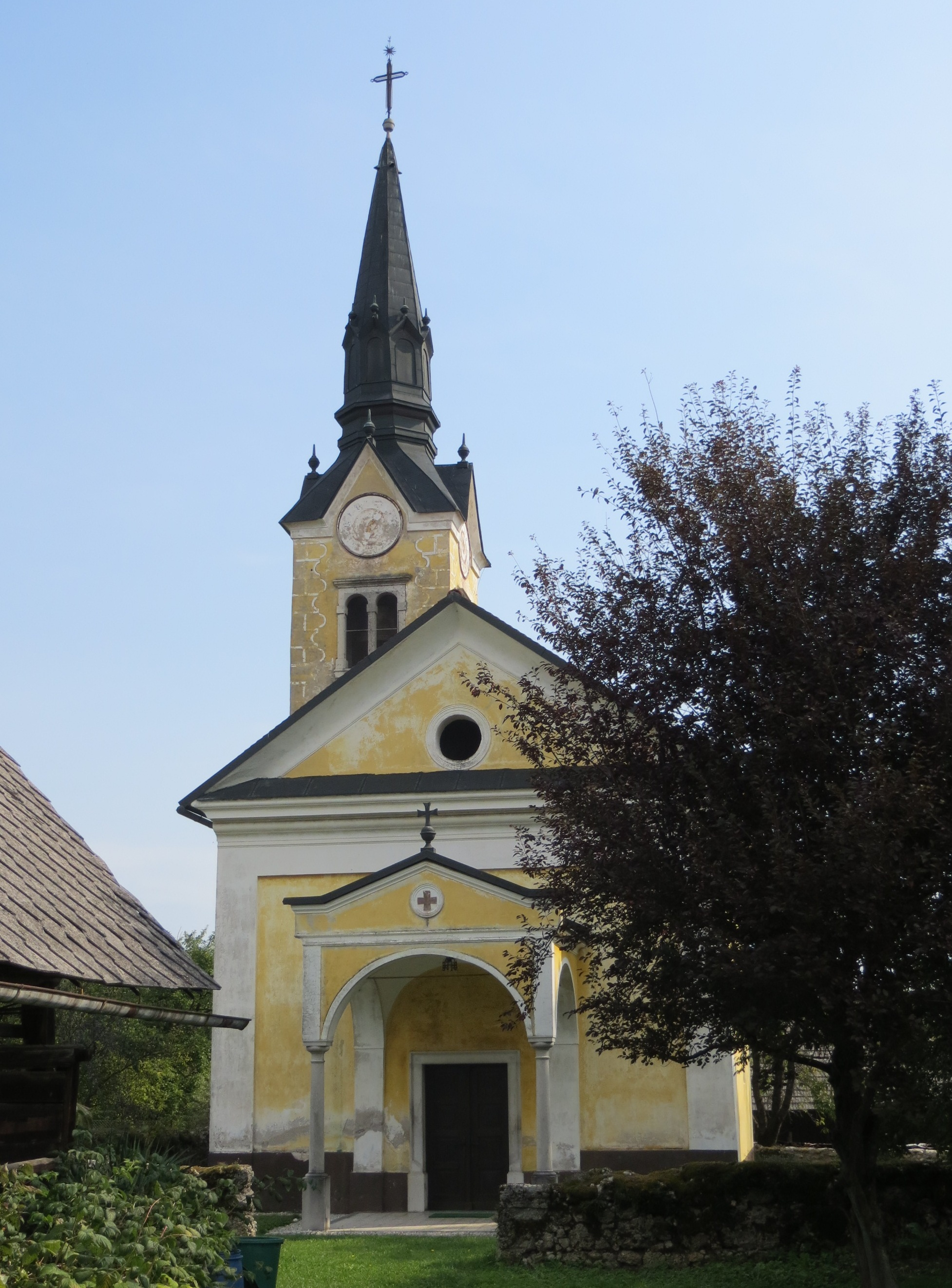
Saint Mary Magdalene Church

The church in Praše is dedicated to Mary Magdalene. It was mentioned in written sources in the 15th century and was reworked in the Baroque style in the mid-19th century. It contains a gilded altar with a painting of Mary Magdalene by Gašper Porenta (1870–1930).

== Notable people ==
Notable people that were born or lived in Praše include:

- Ivan Jenko (1853–1891), poet
- Simon Jenko (1835–1869), poet and writer
