= Municipality of Šenčur =

Municipality of Slovenia

Municipality of Šenčur Občina Šenčur
- Municipality
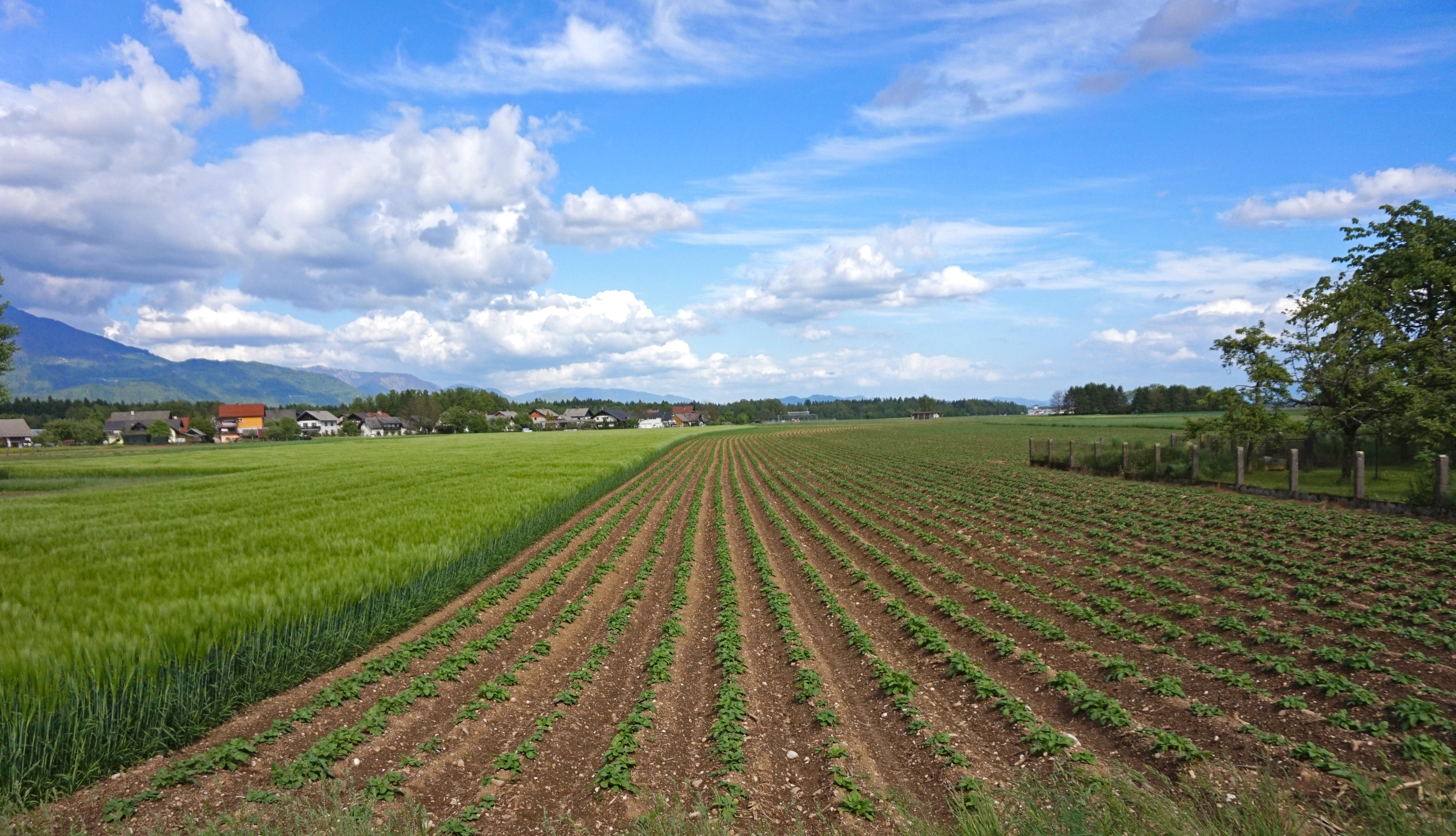

- Location of the Municipality of Šenčur in Slovenia
- Coordinates: 46°15′N 14°25′E
- Country: Slovenia

Government
  - Mayor: Ciril Kozjek

Area
  - Total: 40.3 km^{2} (15.6 sq mi)

Population (2010)
  - Total: 8,477
  - Density: 210/km^{2} (545/sq mi)
- Time zone: UTC+01 (CET)
  - Summer (DST): UTC+02 (CEST)
- Website: www.sencur.si

The Municipality of Šenčur (pronounced [ʃɛnˈtʃuːɾ]; Slovene: Občina Šenčur) is a municipality in Slovenia. The seat of the municipality is the settlement of Šenčur. The municipality was established in its current form on 3 October 1994, when the former larger Municipality of Kranj was subdivided into five smaller municipalities. The municipal holiday is celebrated on 23 April, St. George's Day.

== Settlements ==
In addition to the municipal seat of Šenčur, the municipality also includes the following settlements:

- Hotemaže
- Luže
- Milje
- Olševek
- Prebačevo
- Srednja Vas pri Šenčurju
- Trboje
- Visoko
- Voglje
- Voklo
- Žerjavka
