= Milje, Šenčur =

Milje
- Location in Slovenia
- Coordinates: 46°16′2.62″N 14°24′19.09″E
- Country: Slovenia
- Traditional Region: Upper Carniola
- Statistical region: Upper Carniola
- Municipality: Šenčur
- Elevation: 431.1 m (1,414 ft)

Population (2002)
  - Total: 293

Milje (pronounced [ˈmiːljɛ]) is a village in the Municipality of Šenčur in the Upper Carniola region of Slovenia.
