= Luže, Šenčur =

Luže
- Village
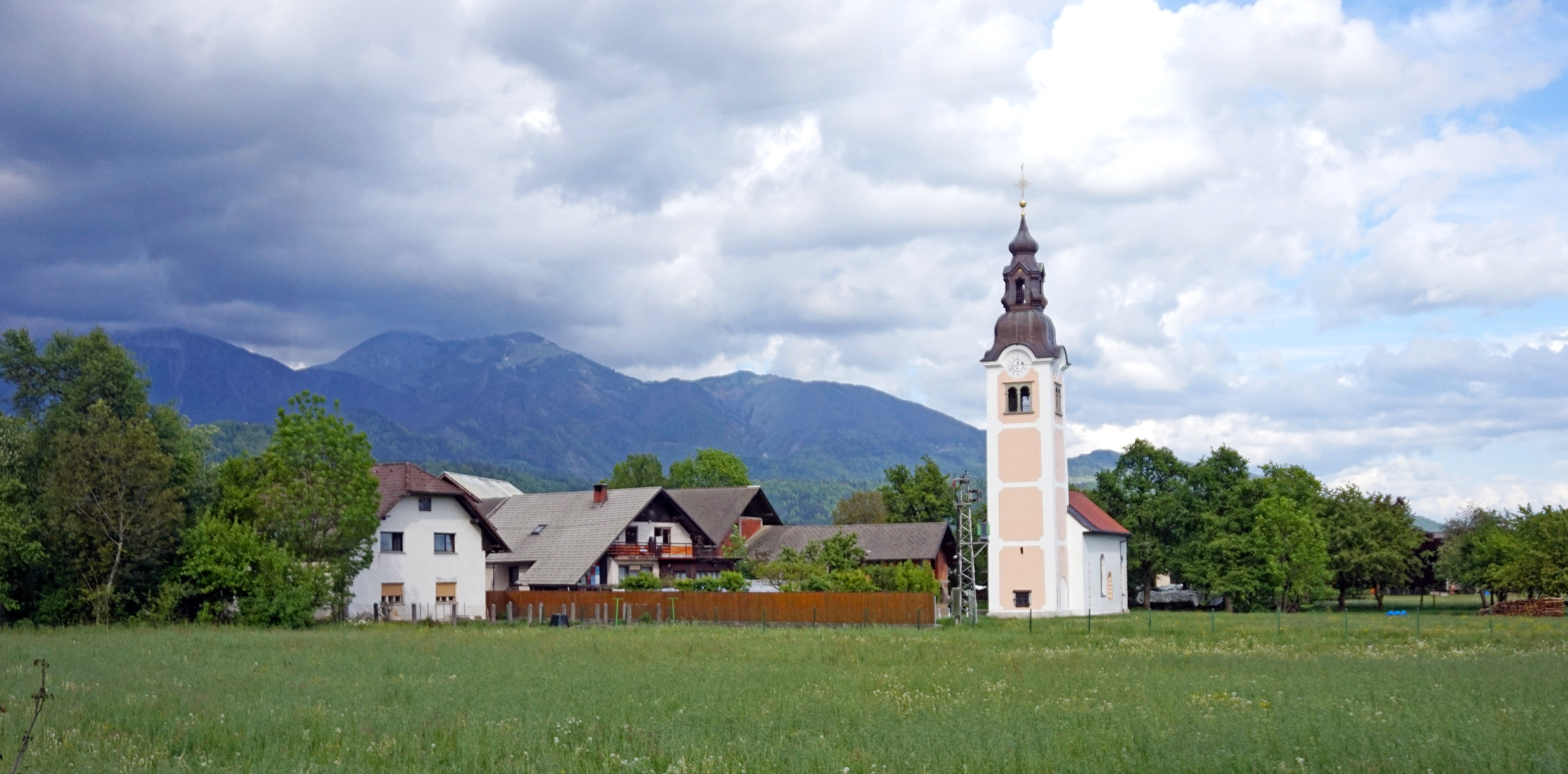

- Location in Slovenia
- Coordinates: 46°15′56.01″N 14°26′0.51″E
- Country: Slovenia
- Traditional region: Upper Carniola
- Statistical region: Upper Carniola
- Municipality: Šenčur
- Elevation: 428.8 m (1,407 ft)

Population (2026)
  - Total: 357

Luže (pronounced [ˈluːʒɛ]; German: Lausach) is a village in the Municipality of Šenčur in the Upper Carniola region of Slovenia.

== Name ==
Luže was first attested in written sources in 1154 as Lusse (and as Lausach in 1238). The name is shortened from the demonym *Lužane, literally 'people living near a pond', derived from the Slovene common noun *luža 'pond, puddle'. In the past the German name was Lausach.

== Church ==
The church in the village is dedicated to John the Baptist. It is a gothic single-aisle church that was rebuilt in the early 19th century. Its belfry was originally separate from the nave, but with expansion during rebuilding it became part of the church structure. The main altar dates to 1886. The church contains a Baroque altar dating to 1691 and a painting by Jurij Šubic (1855–1890).
