= Mavčiče =

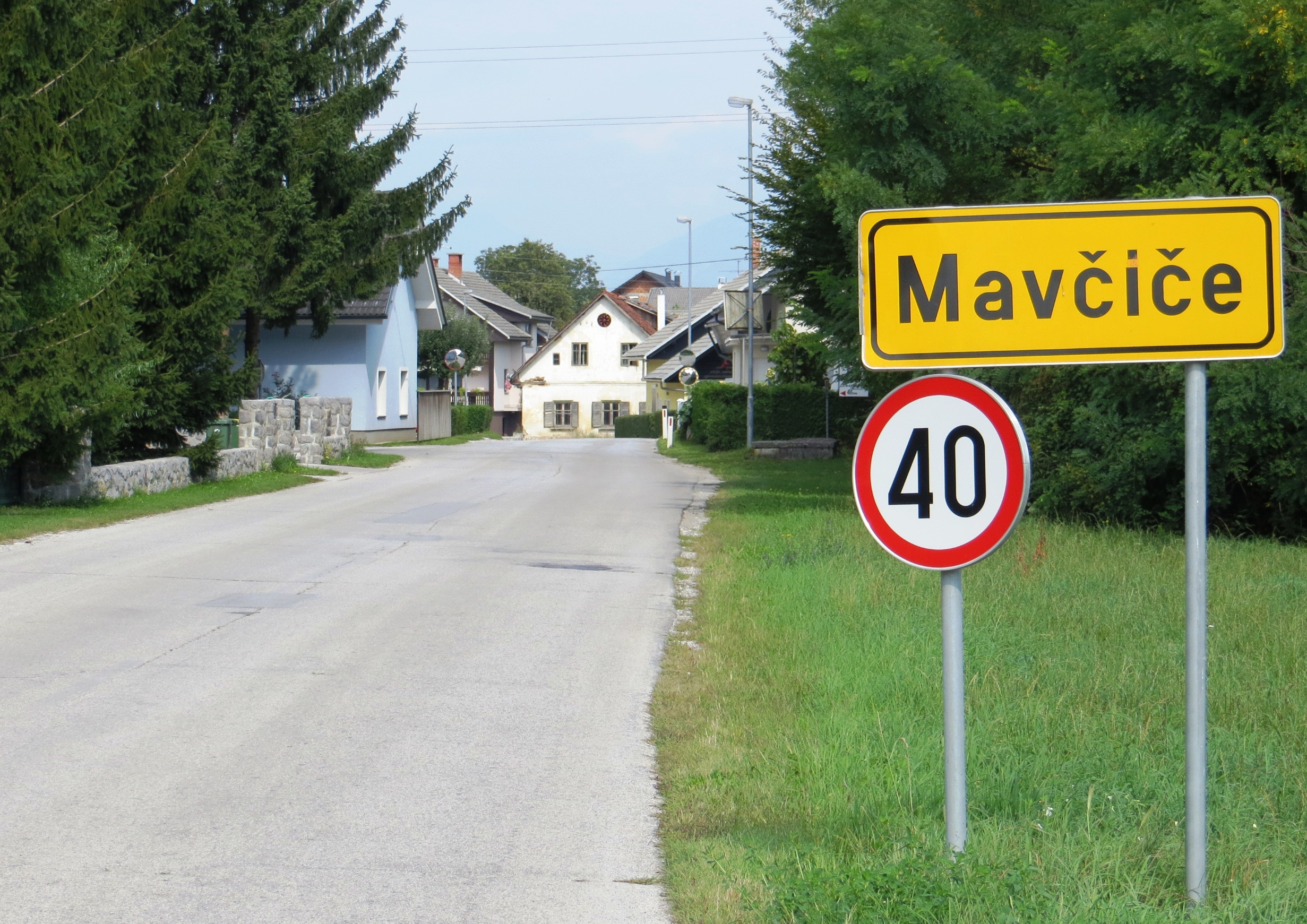

- Location in Slovenia
- Coordinates: 46°10′55.88″N 14°24′19.12″E
- Country: Slovenia
- Traditional region: Upper Carniola
- Statistical region: Upper Carniola
- Municipality: Kranj

Area
  - Total: 3.09 km^{2} (1.19 sq mi)
- Elevation: 360.1 m (1,181 ft)

Population (2002)
  - Total: 413

Mavčiče (pronounced [ˈmaːu̯tʃitʃɛ]; German: Mautschitsch) is a village on the right bank of the Sava River in the Municipality of Kranj in the Upper Carniola region of Slovenia. It lies southwest of Lake Trboje, a reservoir of the Mavčiče Hydroelectric Plant, which is located in the village.

== Name ==
Mavčiče was attested in written sources in 1439 as Maltschitz and Maltzitz (and as Maltschitsch in 1455 and Malczicz in 1464). The name may be derived from *Malъčiťi, a plural patronymic from the personal name *Malъkъ, thus referring to an early inhabitant. An alternate theory is based on the attestation Vuizilinesteti from 973; if this is derived from Old High German luizili 'small' + stat 'town', and if it refers to Mavčiče, then the name could be derived from the plural demonym *Mal(ovьsь)čiťane (literally, 'residents of a small village'). However, this hypothesis is phonologically and morphologically problematic. In the past the German name was Mautschitsch.

== Hydroelectric plant ==
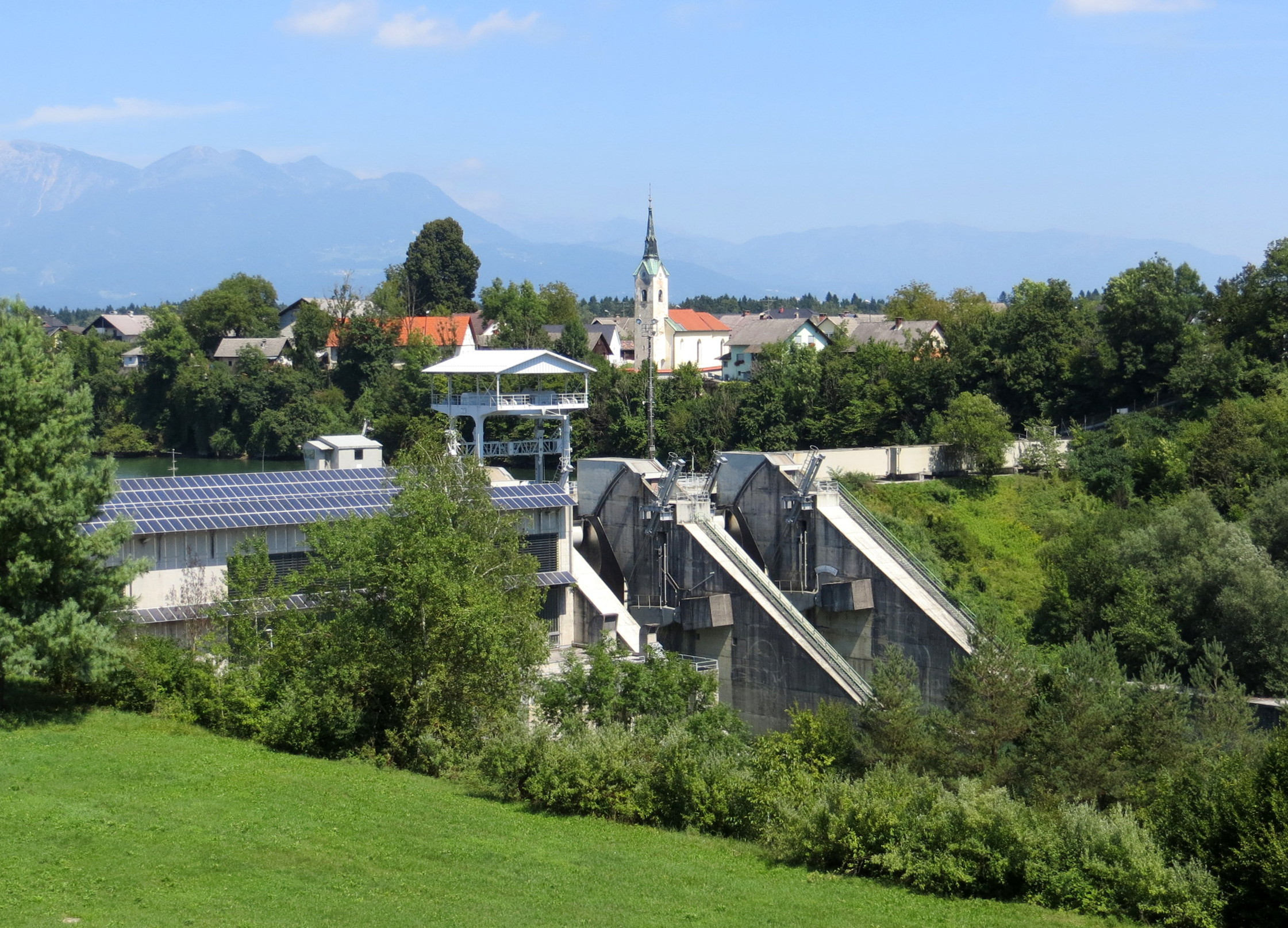
Mavčiče Hydroelectric Plant

The Mavčiče Hydroelectric Plant began operating in 1987 and has an average yearly capacity of 61 GWh. In 2006 and 2007 solar panels with a capacity of 72 kW·h were mounted on its southern face, making it the largest solar power production unit in Slovenia to date.

== Church ==
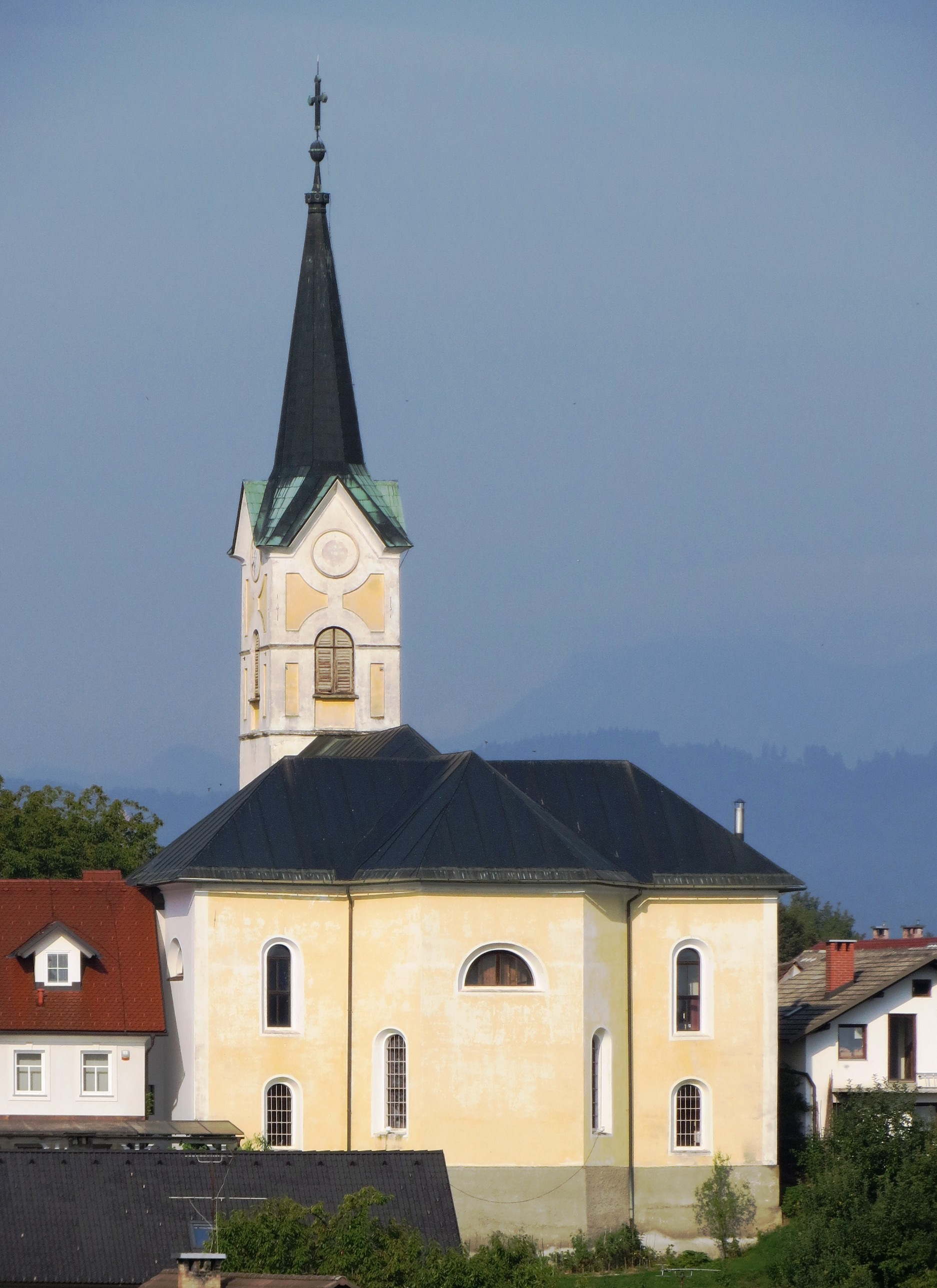
Conversion of Paul Church

The parish church in the settlement is dedicated to the Conversion of Paul. It was first mentioned in documents dating to the 15th century, but the current building dates to the 1820s.
